= List of Romani people =

This is a list of notable Romani people and people of Romani descent.

== Activists ==
- Nicolae Gheorghe – Romanian Roma Movement founder
- Pastora Filigrana – Spanish labour lawyer, trade unionist, feminist, columnist, and human rights activist
- Alfonso Mejia-Arias – Mexican musician and politician
- Ceija Stojka – Austrian artist and writer
- Constantin S. Nicolăescu-Plopșor – Romanian historian, archeologist, anthropologist and writer
- Ian Hancock – English linguist
- Vasile Ionescu - Romanian Activist
- Katarina Taikon – Swedish actress and author
- Marcel Courthiade – French linguist
- Milena Hübschmannová – Czech professor
- Paul Polansky – American writer
- Ronald Lee – Canadian writer
- Saša Barbul – Serbian actor and film director
- Anzhelika Bielova – Ukrainian Romani activist

== Artists ==
- Sandra Jayat, French painter, poet and author
- Damian Le Bas, English artist
- Delaine Le Bas, English artist
- Kiba Lumberg, Finnish artist and author
- Joe Machine, English painter
- La Chunga, Spanish painter
- Tracey Emin, English artist
- Antonio Solario, Italian painter
- Otto Mueller, German painter

== Athletes ==
=== Boxers ===
- Billy Joe Saunders – English
- Johnny Frankham - English
- Dorel Simion – Romanian
- Faustino Reyes – Spanish
- Ivailo Marinov – Bulgarian
- Marian Simion – Romanian
- Samuel Carmona Heredia – Spanish
- Serafim Todorov – Bulgarian
- Zoltan Lunka – German
- Johann Wilhelm Trollmann, German
- Jakob Bamberger, German
- Gary Buckland, Welsh
- Domenico Spada, Italian
- Michele di Rocco, Italian

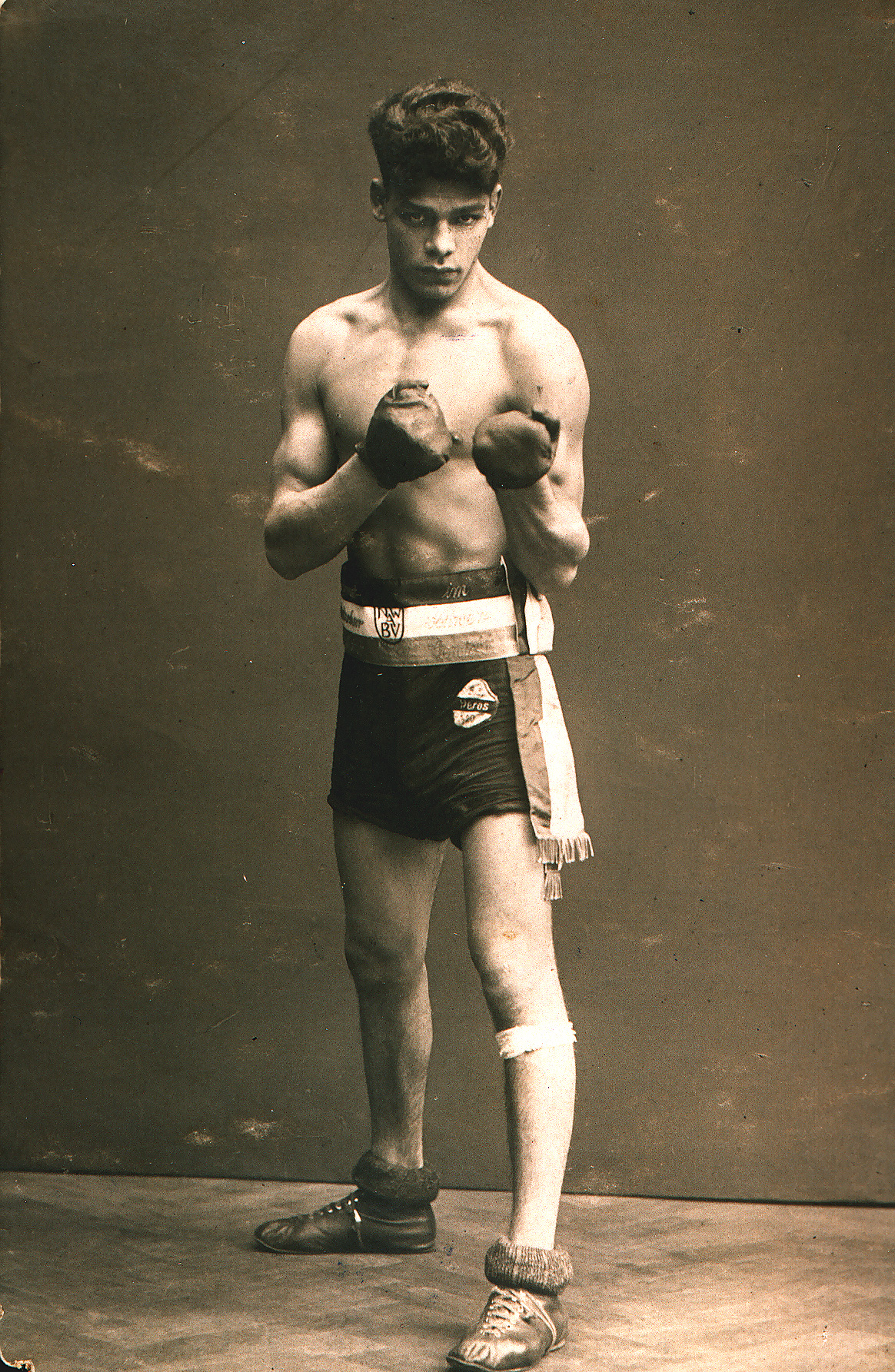
Johann Wilhelm “Rukeli” Trollman, 1928

=== Cycling ===
- Roger De Vlaeminck – Belgian

=== Kickboxers ===
- Václav Sivák – Czech

=== Professional Wrestlers ===
- Gigi Dolin – American

=== Footballers ===
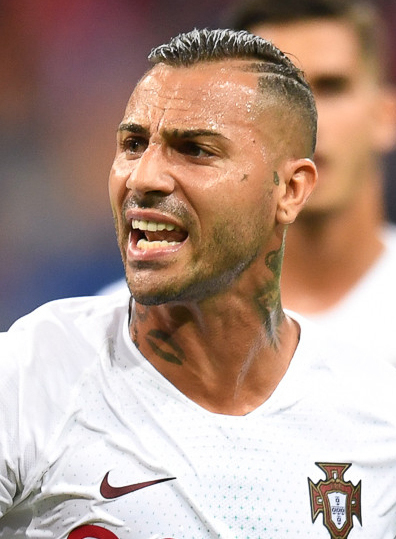
Ricardo Quaresma at the 2018 FIFA World Cup

- André-Pierre Gignac – French
- Andy Delort - mixed French and Algerian
- Antonio Amaya – Spanish
- Bănel Nicoliță – Romanian
- Carlos Martins – Portuguese
- Carlos Muñoz Cobo – Spanish
- Christos Patsatzoglou – Greek
- Dani Güiza – Spanish
- Dejan Osmanović – Serbian
- Diego Rodríguez – Spanish
- Emil Abaz – Macedonian
- Eric Cantona – French
- Eugen Bari – Slovak
- Freddy Eastwood – Welsh
- Georgi Ivanov - Gonzo – Bulgarian
- Hristo Stoichkov - Bulgarian
- Gigi Meroni – Italian
- Giorgos Giakoumakis – Greek
- István Pisont – Hungarian
- János Farkas – Hungarian
- Jesús Navas – Spanish
- Jordan Galtier – French
- José Antonio Reyes – Spanish
- Kristián Bari - Slovak
- Lazaros Christodoulopoulos – Greek
- Marco Navas – Spanish
- Mircea Lucescu – Romanian
- Milan Baroš – Czech
- Mykola Morozyuk – Ukrainian
- Lobo Carrasco – Spanish
- Guille Fernández – Spanish,
- Toni Fernández – Spanish
- Rafael Jiménez Jarque – Spanish
- Joaquin Fernandez Moreno – Spanish
- Petre Marin - Romanian
- Predrag Luka - Serbian
- Rab Howell – English
- Răzvan Marin - Romanian
- Ricardo Quaresma – Portuguese
- Téji Savanier – French
- Telmo Zarra – Spanish
- Nacho Novo – Spanish
- Tony Vairelles – French
- Yohan Mollo - French

=== Hockey players ===
- Dominik Lakatoš – Czech

== Cinema and theater ==
- Hiba Abouk – Spanish actress
- Sandro de América – Argentine actor
- Saša Barbul – Serbian actor
- Gratiela Brancusi – American-Romanian actress
- Yul Brynner – Russian-American actor and honorary president of the International Romani Union
- Jesús Castro – Spanish actor
- Lyalya Chyornaya – Russian actress
- Jan Cina – Czech actor
- Joaquín Cortés – Spanish ballet and flamenco dancer
- Billy Drago – American actor
- Alba Flores – Spanish actress
- Tony Gatlif – French film director
- Bob Hoskins – English actor
- Manoush – French actress
- Moira Orfei – Italian circus performer
- Blanca Romero – Spanish actress
- Custodia Romero – Spanish flamenco dancer
- Alina Șerban – Romanian actress
- Leonor Teles – Portuguese film director
- Tracey Ullman – British-American actress
- Anneli Sauli – Finnish actress
- Connor Swindells – English actor
- Danny Lee Wynter – British actor
- Virginia Raffaele – Italian actress

== Musicians ==
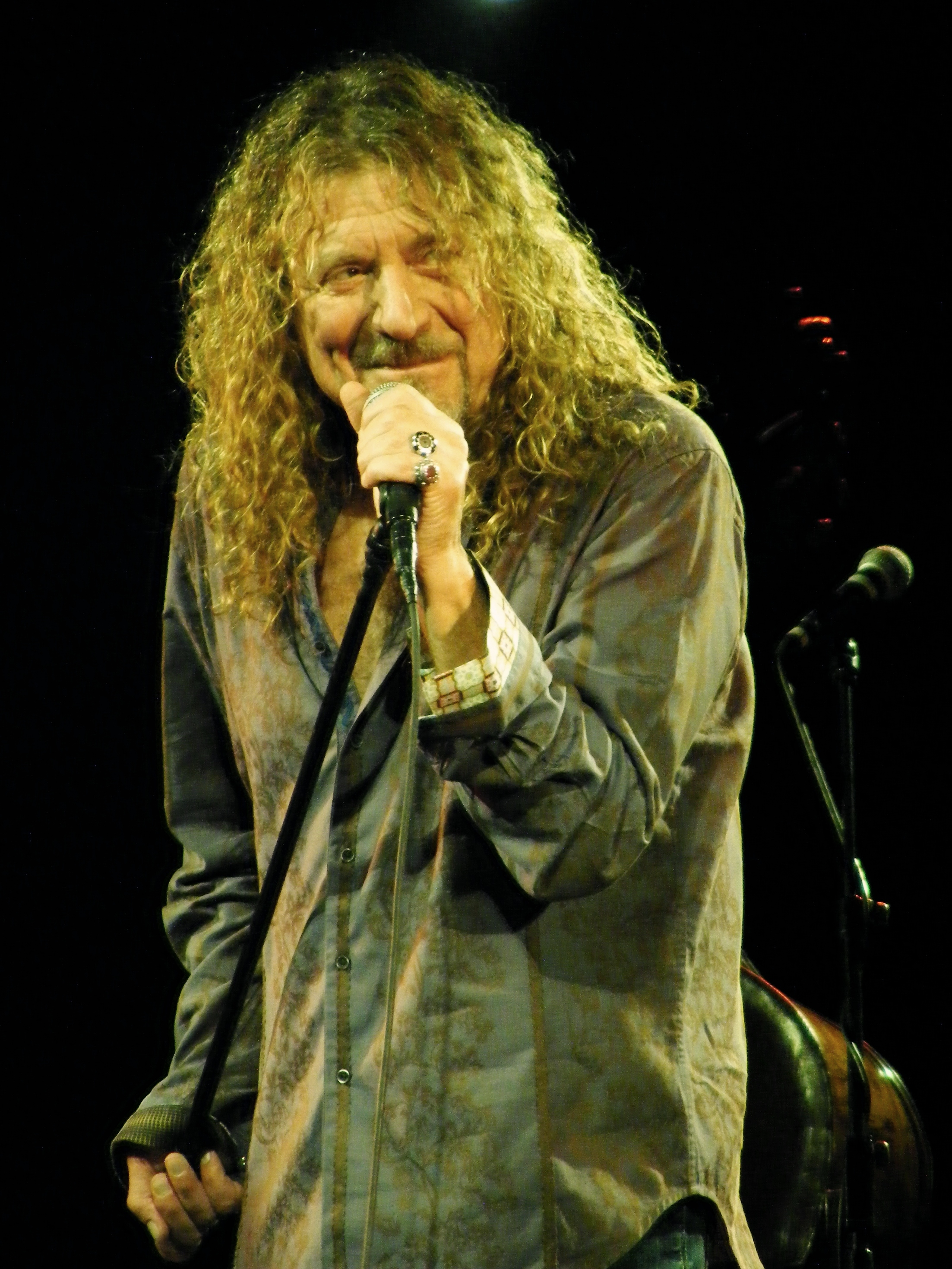
Robert Plant of Led Zeppelin in 2010

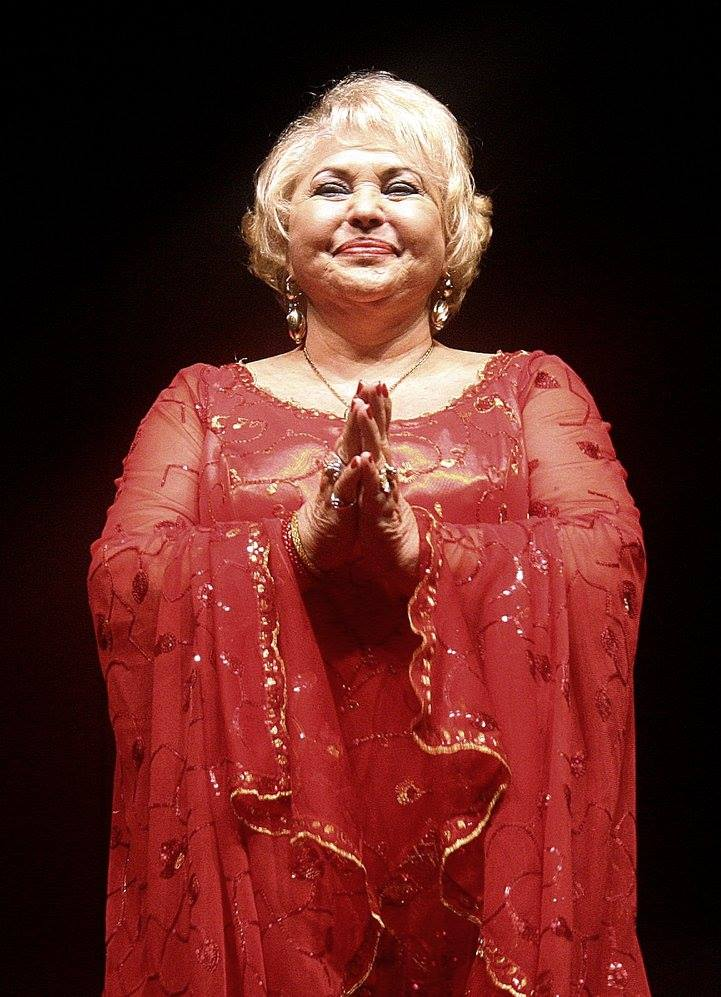
Esma Redzepova in 2015

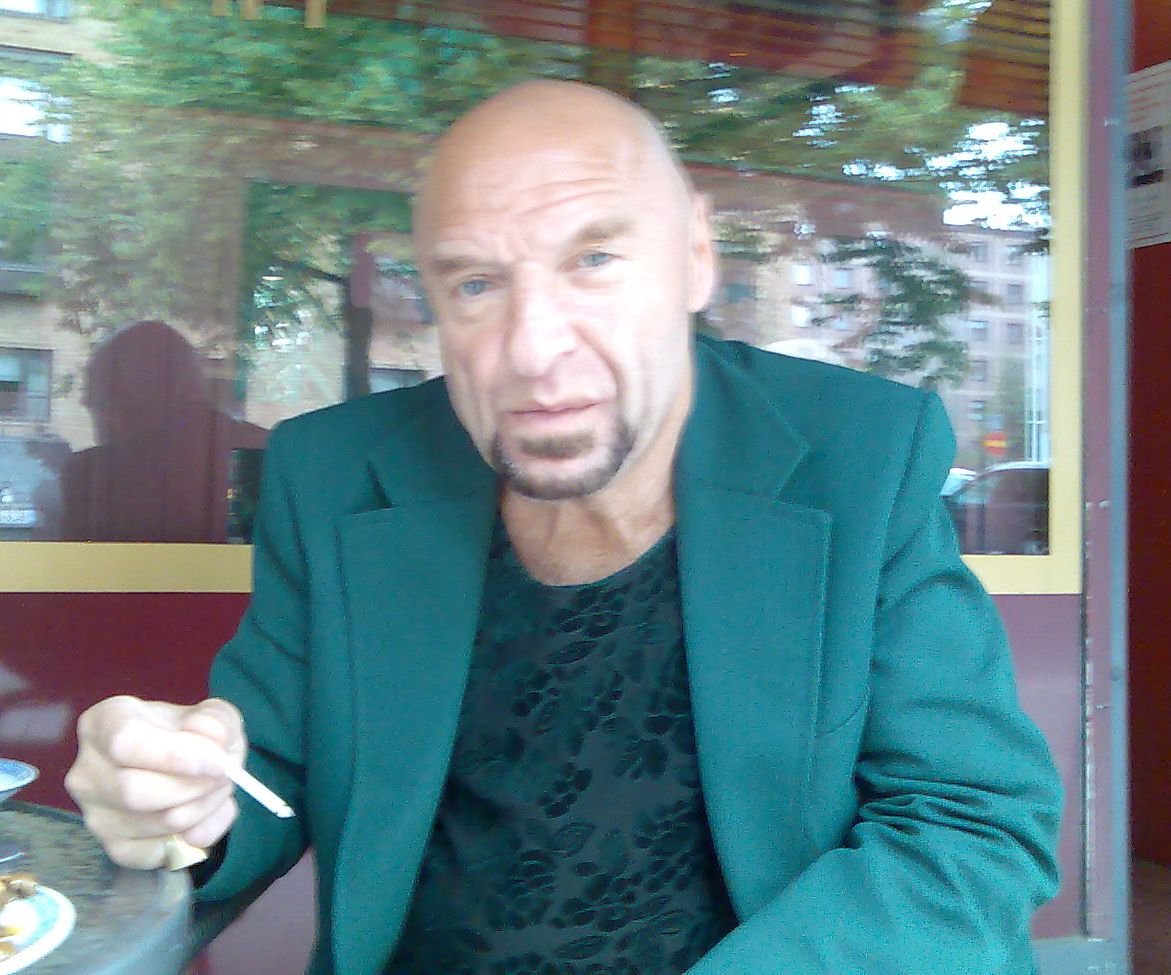
Henry Olavi "Remu" Aaltonen in 2007

- 100 Kila – Bulgarian rapper
- Adam Ant – English singer and musician
- Adrian Minune – Romanian singer
- Věra Bílá
- Aggelopoulos Manolis (1939–1989) – Greek singer and actor
- Albert Lee (born 1943) – London born and raised country rock guitar
- Andro (born 2001) – Russian singer
- Antonio Flores (1961–1995) – Spanish singer-songwriter and actor
- Antoñita Singla - Flamenco dancer, years active: 1960–1988
- Ayo – A sinti and yoruba singer.
- Azis – Bulgarian singer
- Biréli Lagrène (born 1966) – French jazz guitarist, violinist and bassist
- Boban Marković – Serbian brass bandleader and trumpet player
- Bódi Guszti – Hungarian musician
- Calle Jularbo – Swedish accordionist
- Camarón de la Isla (1950–1992) – Spanish flamenco singer
- Carlos Montoya (1903–1993) – Spanish flamenco guitarist
- Carmen Amaya – Spanish flamenco dancer
- Cher Lloyd – English singer
- Christian Escoudé – French jazz guitarist
- Connect-R – Romanian singer
- Damian Drăghici – Romanian musician
- Dani Mocanu – Romanian manele singer
- Denny Laine – British musician (The Moody Blues, Wings)
- Didem – Turkish bellydancer
- Diego el Cigala – Spanish flamenco singer
- Django Reinhardt – Belgian guitarist
- Drafi Deutscher – (1946–2006) German Sinto songwriter, singer and composer
- Džej Ramadanovski (1964–2020) – born in Belgrade (former Yugoslavia), modern Serbian folk singer
- Edyta Górniak (born 1972) – Polish singer
- Elek Bacsik – Hungarian-American jazz guitarist and violinist
- Eleni Vitali – Greek singer and composer
- Esma Redžepova (1943–2016) – Macedonian singer and songwriter
- Eugene Hütz – Ukrainian singer, guitarist, DJ and actor
- Falete (Rafael Ojeda Rojas) – Spanish singer
- Fanfare Ciocărlia (formed 1996) – Romanian brass band
- Félix Lajkó (born 1974) – Hungarian-Serbian violinist and composer (part Romani)
- Florin Salam – Romanian singer
- György Cziffra (1921–1994) – Hungarian virtuoso pianist
- Gigi Radics – Hungarian singer
- Haris Džinović (born 1951) – Bosnian folk singer
- Harri Stojka – Austrian jazz guitarist
- Häns'che Weiss, famous for his Gypsy jazz style, won the Deutscher Schallplattenpreis
- Hüsnü Şenlendirici – Turkish musician
- Ion Voicu (1923–1997) – Romanian violinist and orchestral conductor, founder of Bucharest Chamber Orchestra
- Irini Merkouri (born 1981) – Greek pop singer
- Iva Bittová – Czech singer and violinist
- Ivo Papazov (born 1952) – Bulgarian jazz clarinetist
- János Bihari – Hungarian violinist
- Jentina – English rapper
- Jerry Mason – American singer, guitarist
- Jimmy Rosenberg (born 1980) – Dutch swing guitarist
- Joaquín Cortés – Spanish flamenco dancer
- Joe Longthorne (1955-2019) – English singer and impressionist
- Joe Zawinul – Austrian jazz keyboardist
- Johnny Răducanu (1931–2011) – Romanian jazz musician
- Kal – Romani world music band from Serbia
- Kibariye – Turkish singer of Romani descent
- Kostas Hatzis – Greek singer-songwriter and musician
- Lolita Flores (1958) – Spanish singer and actress
- Los Niños de Sara – French (Spanish origin, Iberian Kale) rumba and flamenco singers and guitar players
- Manitas de Plata (born 1921) – Spanish guitarist
- Manolis Angelopoulos – Greek singer
- Marianne Rosenberg (born 1955) – German singer-songwriter; daughter of German Gypsy who survived Auschwitz
- Marija Šerifović – Serbian singer, winner of Eurovision Song Contest 2007
- Mariska Veres – Dutch singer
- Mercedes Bentso – Finnish rapper
- Mónika Lakatos – Hungarian singer
- Montse Cortés – Spanish flamenco singer
- Natalia Jiménez – Spanish singer-songwriter
- Neon Hitch - English singer-songwriter
- Nicole Cherry – Romanian singer
- Nicolae Guță – Romanian manele singer
- Nicolae Neacșu ("Culai") – Lăutar, was the leader of Taraf de Haïdouks
- Nicolas Reyes (born 1958) – Franco-Spanish singer, guitar player; lead singer for the Gipsy Kings, a band made up mostly of members of his extended family
- Nikolai Shishkin – Russian guitarist and singer
- Niña Pastori – Spanish flamenco singer
- Panna Czinka (1711–1772) – Hungarian violinist, born in Kingdom of Hungary in modern Slovakia
- Patrik Vrbovský - "Rytmus", slovak hip hop artist, active since '92
- Paulus Schäfer (born 1978) – Dutch jazz guitarist
- Pere Pubill Calaf "Peret" (1935–2014) – Catalan Spanish singer, guitar player and composer
- Pista Dankó – Hungarian composer
- Radoslav Banga – of Czech group Gypsy.cz
- Rafet El Roman – Turkish singer
- Ramón Montoya (1889–1949) – Spanish flamenco guitarist
- Rayito (Antonio Rayo) – Spanish guitarist, singer and composer. Father Gitano (Iberian Kalo) and mother Japanese
- Remedios Amaya – Spanish singer
- Remu Aaltonen - Finnish drummer and singer
- Robert Plant (born 1948) – English singer and songwriter (former vocalist of Led Zeppelin). Romanichal mother
- Robi Botos – Hungarian-Canadian jazz pianist
- Romica Puceanu (1928–1996) – Romanian singer (urban Lăutărească music)
- Rosa López (born 1981) – Spanish singer
- Rosario Flores (born 1963) – Spanish singer and actress, Latin Grammy award winner
- Šaban Bajramović – Serbian singer
- Sandu Ciorbă – Romanian singer
- Santino Spinelli – Italian singer and musician
- Sasha Kolpakov (born 1943) – Russian guitarist
- Schnuckenack Reinhardt – German violinist and composer, a pioneer of sinti jazz.
- Selim Sesler – Turkish virtuoso
- Sido – Former rapper, well known for popularizing the aggro line of music in Germany in the 90s.
- Sinan Sakić – Serbian singer
- Sofi Marinova – Bulgarian singer
- Alex Velea – Romanian singer
- Sotis Volanis – Greek pop folk singer
- Stiv Bators – American vocalist
- Stochelo Rosenberg (born 19 February 1968) – Gypsy jazz guitarist who leads the Rosenberg Trio
- Taisto Tammi – Finnish singer
- Taraful Haiducilor – (Taraf de Haïdouks) Romanian band, formed 1989
- Tea Tairović – Serbian singer
- Toni Iordache – Romanian musician
- Tonino Baliardo – Franco-Spanish guitar player; also a member of the Gipsy Kings
- Joci Pápai – Hungarian singer
- Valentina Ponomaryova (born 1939) – Russian singer
- Věra Bílá – Czech vocalist
- Vicente Escudero – Spanish flamenco dancer
- Viki Gabor - Polish singer
- Wally Tax – Dutch rock singer, of The Outsiders; son of a Dutch father and a Russian Romani mother
- Tzancă Uraganu – Romanian singer
- Žarko Jovanović – Serbian musician
- Yuri Yunakov – Bulgarian musician
- Ron Wood - British musician

== Politicians ==
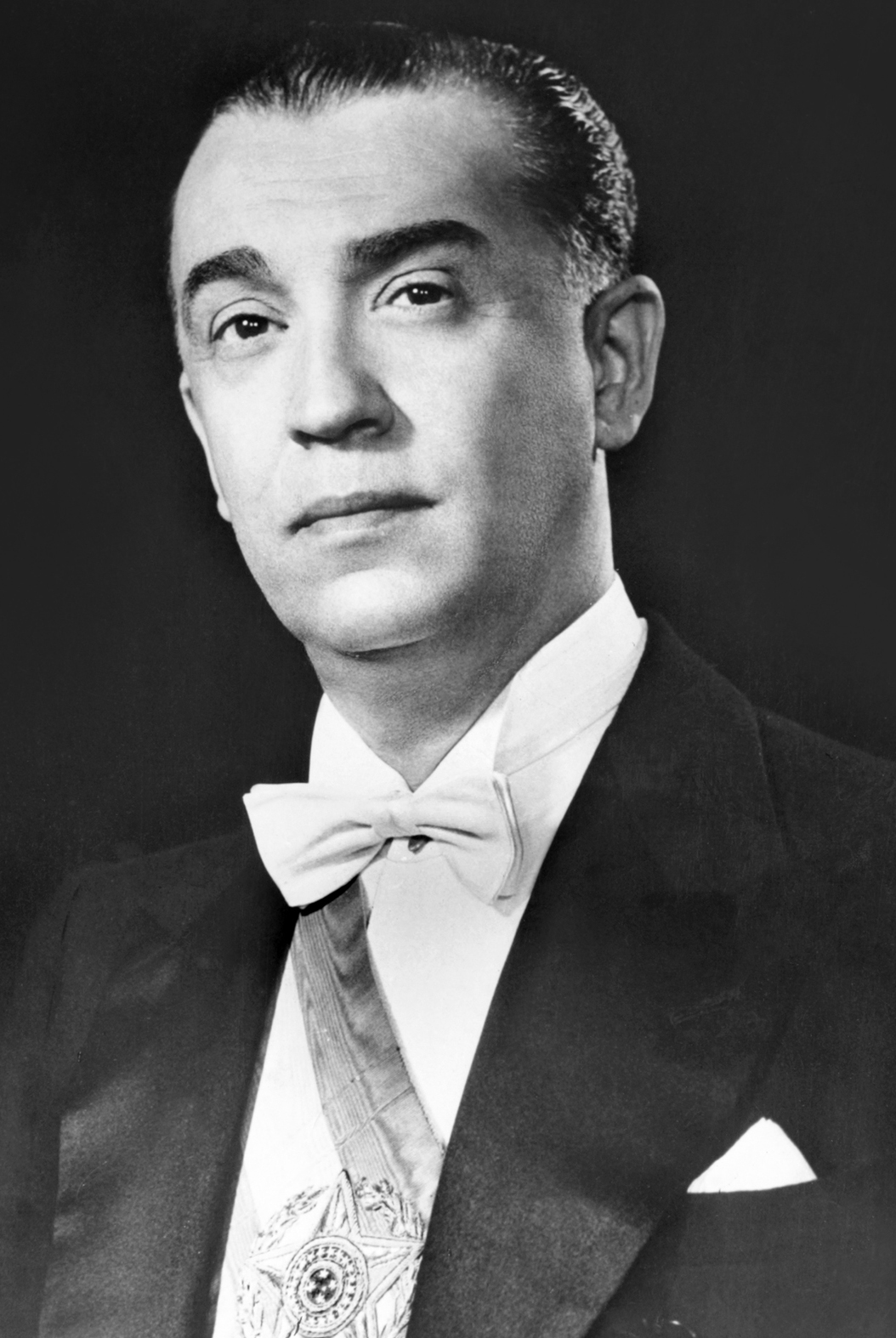
Juscelino Kubitschek, the 21st president of Brazil

- Ágnes Osztolykán – Hungarian politician
- Carlos Miguel – Portuguese minister and mayor
- Flórián Farkas – Hungarian politician
- Idália Serrão – Portuguese secretary of state and MP
- Irena Bihariová – Slovak lawyer and politician
- James Farnell – Australian politician
- Juan de Dios Ramírez Heredia – Spanish MEP
- Juscelino Kubitschek – 21st President of Brazil
- Ladislas Lazaro – American politician
- Lívia Járóka – Hungarian MEP
- László Berényi – Hungarian politician
- Nazif Memedi – Croatian politician
- Gogu Rădulescu – Romanian politician
- Srđan Šajn – Serbian politician
- Talât Pasha – Turkish politician
- Özcan Purçu – Turkish politician
- Peter Pollák – Slovak politician
- Washington Luís – 13th President of Brazil

== Various ==
- Dehran Asanov - Macedonian-German Salafi preacher and charity fraudster
- Tayo Awosusi-Onutor – German musician, writer, filmmaker and human rights activist, born 1978
- Alfie Best – British businessman
- Ceferino Giménez Malla – Spanish beatified Roman Catholic catechist
- Duško Kostić – Croatian academic
- Francisco Rivera Ordóñez – Spanish bullfighter
- Granny Boswell – Irish wise woman and healer
- GypsyCrusader – American white supremacist internet personality
- Marianna Dolińska – Polish murderer (1891–1928)
- Hristo Kyuchukov – German linguist
- John-Henry Phillips FSA – English writer, archaeologist, filmmaker, and television presenter.
- Michael Costello – American fashion designer
- Mystic Meg – English astrologer
- Thekla Popov – 19th-century Hungarian poisoner
- Timofey Prokofiev – Soviet marine infantryman, Hero of the Soviet Union
- Ioana Rudăreasa – Romanian-Roma abolitionist (1843–1856)
- Settela Steinbach – Dutch girl who was gassed in Auschwitz-Birkenau extermination camp
- Rodney Smith – English evangelist
- Chrissy Teigen – American model (born 1985)
- Róisín Mullins – Irish television presenter
- Jean Gordon – Scottish Gypsy
- Mustafa Shibil – Bulgarian Muslim
- Raymond Buckland – English writer on the subject of Wicca and witchcraft
- George Bramwell Evens – British radio broadcaster
- Jamie Macpherson – Scottish fiddler
- Rafael Gómez Ortega – Spanish bullfighter
- Petr Torak – Czech-British former police officer
- Miranda Vuolasranta – Finnish activist
- Philomena Franz – Holocaust survivor
- Zoni Weisz – Holocaust survivor
- Elisabeth Guttenberger – Holocaust survivor
- Margarethe Kraus – Holocaust survivor
- Meeri Koutaniemi – Finnish photographer and journalist
- August Krogh – Danish professor
- Hugo Höllenreiner – Holocaust survivor
- Else Baker – Sinti holocaust survivor (born 1935)
- Alfreda Markowska – Polish Holocaust survivor (1926–2021)
- The Wanderer – Norwegian burglar

== Writers ==
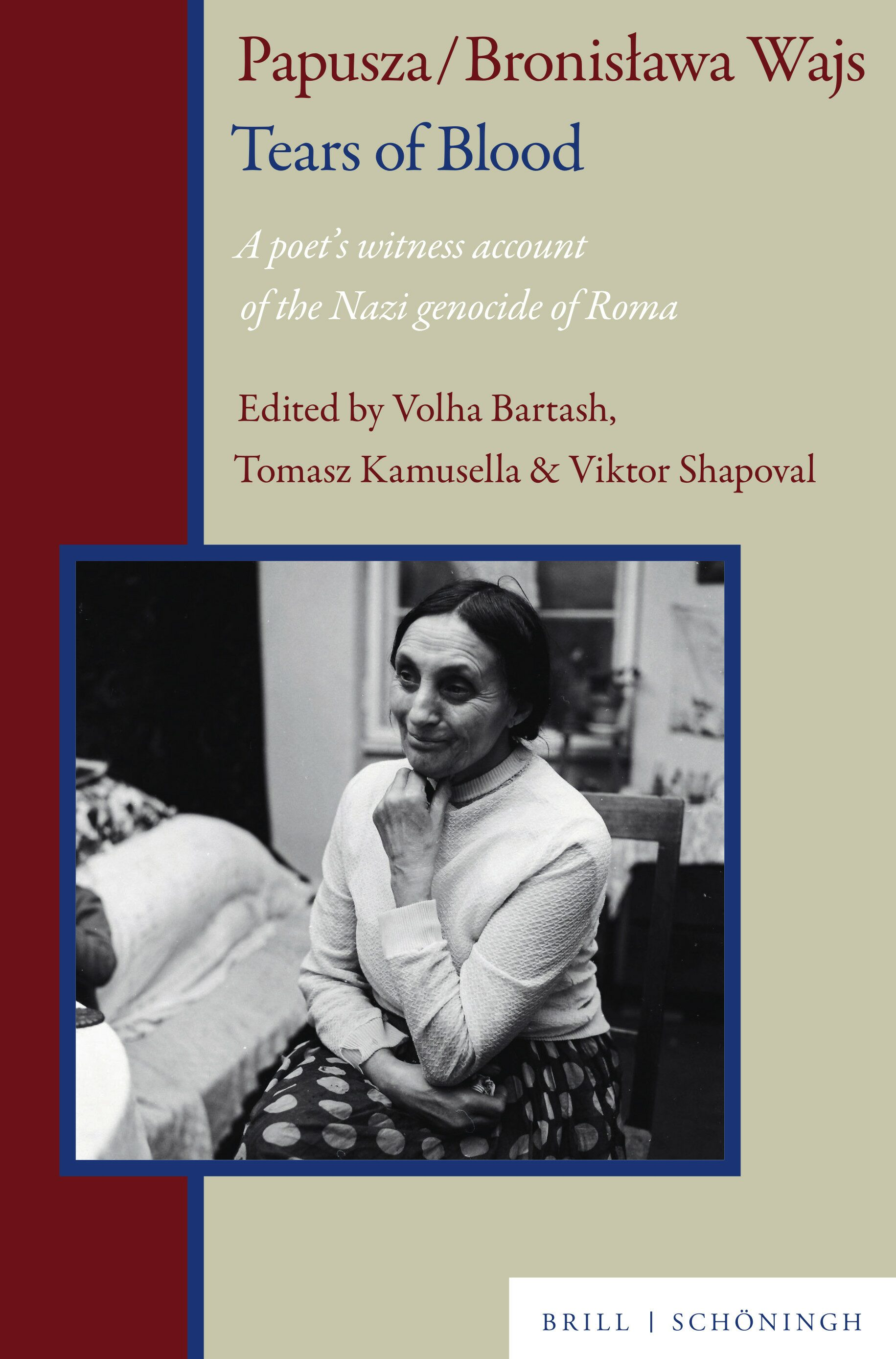
A photograph of Bronisława Wajs on the cover of her book, Tears of Blood

- Bronisława Wajs – Polish
- Caren Gussoff – American
- Charlie Smith – English
- Constantin S. Nicolăescu-Plopșor – Romanian
- Ali Krasniqi – Kosovar
- Bajram Haliti – Kosovar
- David Morley – English
- Elena Lacková – Slovak
- Kiba Lumberg – Finnish
- Hillary Monahan – American
- Louise Doughty – English
- Mariella Mehr – Swiss
- Oksana Marafioti – American
- Matéo Maximoff – French
- Menyhért Lakatos – Hungarian
- Muharem Serbezovski – Macedonian
- Nina Dudarova – Russian
- Rajko Đurić – Serbian
- Sandra Jayat – French
- Seanan McGuire – American
- Veijo Baltzar – Finnish
- Hedina Tahirović-Sijerčić – Bosnian
- Usin Kerim – Bulgarian
- Vita Sackville-West – English
- Eldra Jarman – Welsh
