= Anzhelika Bielova =

Ukrainian activist of Roma origin

- Анжеліка Бєлова
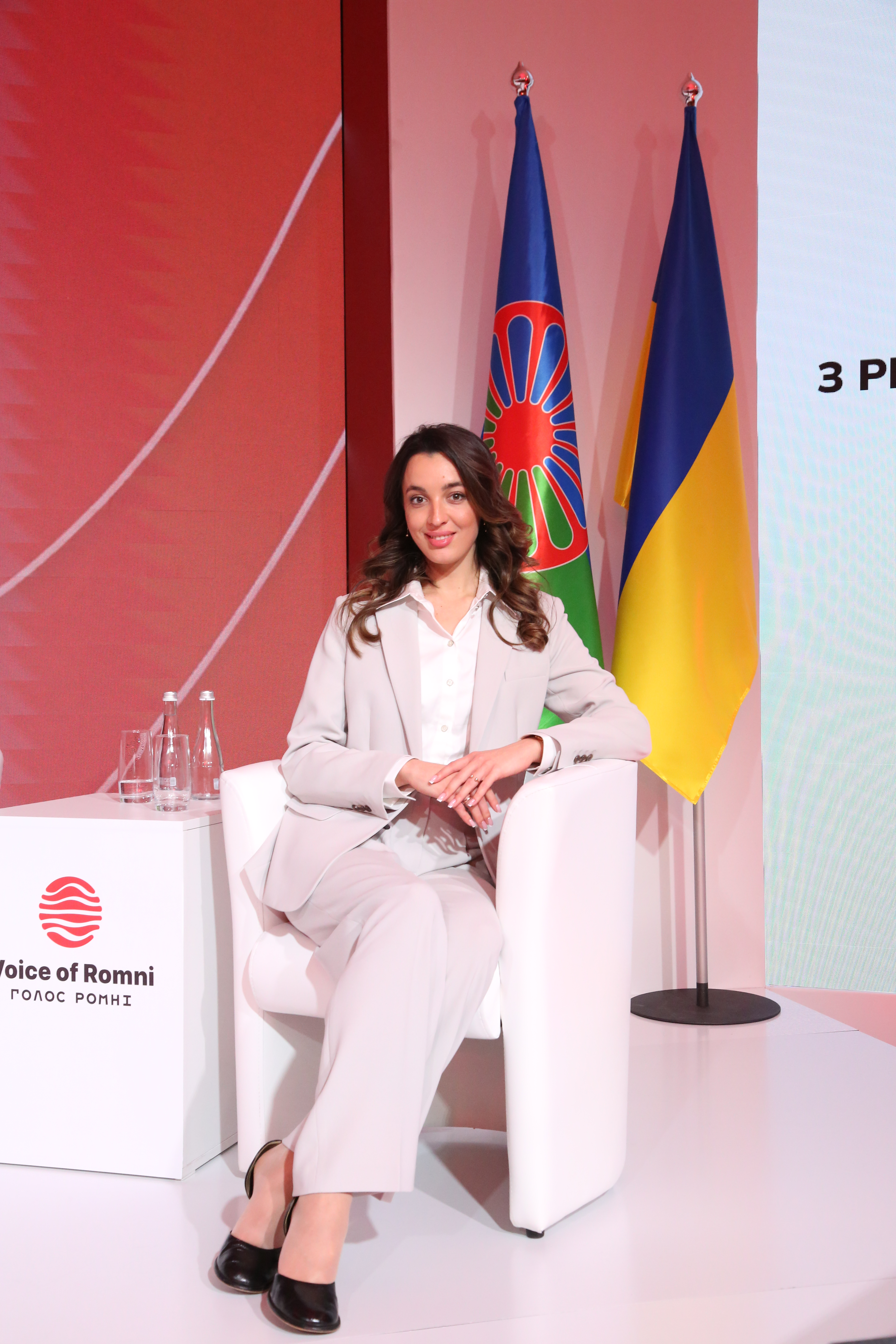
- Born: July 2, 1995 (age 31); Zaporizhzhia, Ukraine
- Citizenship: Ukraine
- Occupations: civil society activist, human rights defender, feminist
- Known for: President of Voice of Romni NGO Regional representative of the Ukrainian Women's Congress

Anzhelika Bielova (born July 2, 1995, Zaporizhzhia) is a Ukrainian activist of Romani origin, human rights defender, and feminist. She is the founder and president of Voice of Romni NGO, a regional representative of the Ukrainian Women's Congress, and a member of the advisory board of the EVZ Foundation.

== Biography ==
=== Family ===
Anzhelika was born and raised in Zaporizhzhia in a mixed-heritage family. The Romani side of her family belongs to the Servitka Roma ethnic group.

Her great-grandparents, Hryhorii Dmytrovych Padchenko and Mariia Andriivna Padchenko, were nomadic Romani who settled in the village of Komyshuvakha, Zaporizhzhia region in 1908. Later, they bought a house in Zaporizhzhia, where they raised five children. Anzhelika's great-grandfather, Andrii Hryhorovych Padchenko (1907–1985), worked at the National Roma Kolkhoz named after Dimitrov. During World War II, he was involved in procuring horses for the army. When Zaporizhzhia was occupied by the Germans, his family faced persecution due to their Romani heritage and was forced into hiding.

Anzhelika's grandmother, Mariia Andriivna Semak (born 1938), is a Romani leader and an engineer. She worked for over 50 years at the Bureau of Technical Inventory in Zaporizhzhia, assisting the Romani community in obtaining legal documentation for land ownership.

=== Career ===
Since 2015, after receiving a grant from the Roma Education Fund to continue her studies, Bielova has been actively involved in Roma activism. She initially worked as an executive director at a local Romani organization, where she implemented over 20 projects aimed at improving access to education, employment, and legal services for Roma people.

In 2019, Bielova survived an attempted femicide — a gender-based attack — when a man with a knife assaulted her in the entrance of her home. The Zaporizhzhia regional police later determined that she was a victim of a serial attacker who had targeted other women.

In 2020, Bielova founded the Romani women's organization, Voice of Romni, and became a regional representative of the Ukrainian Women's Congress, actively advocating for gender equality and the protection of women's and girls’ rights in Ukraine. With the escalation of the Russo-Ukrainian war, the organization has focused on humanitarian aid and assistance to internally displaced Romani women in Ukraine.

She is a member of the advisory board of the EVZ Foundation and the Interagency Working Group on coordinating the implementation of the Strategy for Promoting the Rights and Opportunities of the Roma National Minority in Ukrainian Society until 2030, under the State Service of Ukraine for Ethnic Affairs and Freedom of Conscience (DESS). Anzhelika is also an alumna of the U.S. Embassy's IVLP program.

== Public activities ==
Bielova works across five regions of Ukraine: Kyiv, Zakarpattia, and three frontline regions — Zaporizhzhia, Kharkiv, and Dnipropetrovsk. Her key areas of focus include humanitarian response, economic empowerment of Roma women and other vulnerable groups, early childhood and extracurricular education for children, as well as leadership development and advocacy for the rights of Romani women and the Romani community at international, national, and local levels. A core priority of her work is the prevention and response to gender-based violence (GBV) and the promotion of gender equality within Roma communities.

Since 2020, Bielova has implemented economic development projects for Romani and internally displaced women, helping over 300 women acquire professional skills and find employment. In 2022, following the full-scale Russian invasion of Ukraine, Anzhelika Bielova continued to coordinate her organization's efforts to provide humanitarian aid to Roma men and women in southeastern Ukraine (Zaporizhzhia, Dnipropetrovsk, and Kharkiv regions) and in the western region (Zakarpattia). Since the beginning of the war, Voice of Romni has provided support to more than 105,000 Roma individuals and other vulnerable groups. Currently, the organization operates four regional offices in Zaporizhzhia, Kharkiv, Kryvyi Rih, and Uzhhorod, with plans to open a representation in Kyiv.

Voice of Romni also implements educational projects for Roma children, developing preschool and extracurricular education programs, as well as psychological support initiatives. The organization is actively working on expanding a network of Romani initiatives, supporting Romani activists by providing training in project management, fundraising, and human rights. Additionally, Voice of Romni helps activists implement socially significant initiatives to benefit their communities.

Anzhelika Bielova advocates for the rights of the Romani community in Ukraine and Romani refugees at the international level. She actively participates in high-profile events such as the UN Forum on Minority Issues, the Council of Europe Dialogues with Roma Civil Society, the Ukrainian Women's Congress, the Icelandic Women's Congress, the Feminist Foreign Policy Forum in the Netherlands, the UN Commission on the Status of Women in New York, the Ukraine Recovery Conference in Berlin, and the Women Leaders for the Future of Ukraine Summit in Warsaw, among others.

Bielova, together with the Voice of Romni team, conducted a study on gender practices and experiences of gender-based violence (GBV) within the Romani community, titled Identity, Gender Aspects, and Traditions. This research highlights the urgent need for a systematic approach to preventing violence and supporting survivors.

She also initiated and led a comprehensive study, The State of Roma Communities During the War in Ukraine, which outlines key recommendations requiring coordinated efforts from government institutions, civil society organizations, and international partners. At the initiative of Anzhelika Bielova, the first National Forum on the Implementation of the Roma Strategy: Valuing Diversity was held in Kyiv in 2025. The forum gathered ambassadors and diplomats, government representatives, Roma activists, and members of civil society and charitable organizations. The event was officially opened by Olena Kondratiuk, Deputy Speaker of the Verkhovna Rada of Ukraine. As a result of discussions on the first day of the Forum and the productive work of expert groups on the second day, a joint resolution was developed. This document includes recommendations for the government, international partners, and civil society organizations aimed at enhancing the effectiveness of the Roma Strategy's implementation and ensuring its alignment with the challenges of wartime and the prospects for Ukraine's post-war recovery. Further in-depth work will continue in the regions, with a focus on nationwide coordination of working groups and annual national meetings to advance the strategy's implementation.
