= Romani film =

Romani people have long been a favored topic for filmmakers. The Hamburg Cinemathèque's database records over 2,500 films from 30 different countries that feature Romanies as their central theme. Additionally, several films have been produced by Gypsies or involve them at the production level.

== List of Romani films ==
- Gypsy Wildcat (United States, 1944)
- The Gypsy and the Gentleman (Great Britain, 1957)
- IEvenMetHappyGypsies[Skupljaceperja](Yugoslavia,1967)
- Angelo, My Love (United States, 1983)
- The Time of the Gypsies (Yugoslavia, 1988)—Rajko Djuric ́ was the adviser for this film
- Black Cat, White Cat (Yugoslavia, 1998)

== List of Romani directors ==
- Leonor Teles
- Tony Gatlif

== List of Romani actors ==
- Saša Barbul
