= Győző Istóczy =

Hungarian politician (1842–1915)

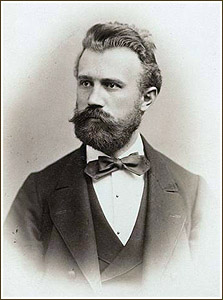
- Born: Győző Istóczy; 7 November 1842; Szentkereszt, Kingdom of Hungary, Austrian Empire
- Died: 9 January 1915 (aged 72); Budapest, Austria-Hungary
- Citizenship: Hungarian
- Known for: Antisemitic politician
- Political party: National Antisemitic Party

Győző Istóczy (7 November 1842, Szentkereszt – 9 January 1915, Budapest) was a Hungarian nationalist politician and lawyer in the second half of the 19th century. His antisemitic views were flagrant during his political career.

== Political career ==
He was born in Szentkereszt (today: Táplánszentkereszt, Vas County) on 7 November 1842. He finished his secondary studies in Szombathely. He graduated from the University of Vienna and University of Budapest. After graduating Law he became deputy recorder of the county. He was appointed judge of the County Court in 1868.

In 1878, during his "Palestine speech" before parliament, Istóczy called for Jewish immigration from Eastern Europe to be curbed and for Jewish settlement in Ottoman Palestine to create an independent Jewish state.

He became a member of the Diet of Hungary in 1872 as a member of the Deák Party and represented Rum District until 1892. After the merger of the Deák Party and the Centre Left in 1875, he joined the newly formed Liberal Party. However, he left the group soon and became a non-partisan MP. In 1880 he founded the Alliance of Non-Jews and edited the antisemitic journal Tizenkét röpirat ("Twelve pamphlets").

During the Tiszaeszlár blood libel (murder of the girl Eszter Solymosi) in 1882, Géza Ónody, the representative of Tiszaeszlár in the Hungarian Parliament, and Istóczy proposed the expulsion of the Jews in the House of Representatives, and excited the public against the local Jews, resulting in a number of violent acts and pogroms. Despite the victim Eszter Solymosi having probably been a victim of a sexual aggression (pedophilia), they spread the charge that the Jews killed the girl in order to use her blood at the approaching Passover (April 4). After the trial Istóczy founded the National Antisemitic Party based on the German Christian Social Party. They gained 17 mandates in the 1884 elections. His party split up in 1885 but they still entered the legislature during the 1887 elections. Soon after the National Antisemitic Party finally collapsed. After 1892 he retired from politics.

Istóczy became a model for the subsequent far right parties and movements.
