= Ukrainian Women's Congress =

Annual gender policy event

Ukrainian Women's Congress (Ukrainian: Український Жіночий Конгрес, romanized: Ukrainskyi Zhinochyi Konhres) is a permanent public platform dedicated to shaping the gender policy agenda for the Ukrainian Parliament, government, local communities, private and public sectors, and the media. Established in 2017 by the Equal Opportunities inter-party caucus, the event is organized by the Ukrainian Women's Congress NGO.

== Overview ==
More than 500 active women and men from politics, business, civil society and media stood up for ensuring gender equality in the different sectors of Ukrainian society, seeing it as an essential element for ensuring the sustainable development of Ukraine. The event’s goal is to unite society around the idea of equal opportunities and rights for women and men, and to become the permanent space for gender policy implementation in different sectors. National leaders, Ukrainian and foreign members of parliaments, representatives of international organizations, local authorities, Ukrainian and foreign experts took part in the discussions.

=== 2017 ===
The first Ukrainian Women’s Congress took place on 22–23 November 2017 with the support of Equal Opportunities inter-party caucus. The Prime Minister of Ukraine Volodymyr Groysman spoke at the Congress and more than 300 women and men took part in the event. Olena Kondratiuk, a member of parliament, greeted the participants:

We have to say altogether that the world has to stop being a men’s place

Seven discussion panels on reinforcing women’s participation in political and civic life at different levels, engaging women in peacekeeping and security sectors, eliminating gender-based violence and stereotypes and strengthening gender-sensitive education took place at the Congress. Government representatives, Ukrainian and foreign MPs, representatives of the international organizations and foreign and Ukrainian experts took part in the discussions. Two photo exhibitions were hosted by the Congress – “Not women’s business” prepared within the Povaha campaign, standing against sexism in politics and media with the support of National Democratic Institute in partnership with Dobra Lystivka Fund, and “Women, Peace and Security in Ukraine”, initiated by Ukrainian Women’s Fund with the support of UN Women.

=== 2018 ===
The second Ukrainian Women’s Congress took place on 7–8 December 2018. More than eighty leading Ukrainian and foreign speakers and more than 500 participants took part in nine discussion panels.

The then President of Ukraine Petro Poroshenko and the President of Lithuania Dalia Grybauskaitė participated in the Congress.

The participants discussed the problematic issues related to equal rights and opportunities policies in Ukraine, myths and stereotypes regarding women’s participation in different spheres of social life, implementation of institutional mechanisms for ensuring equality and nondiscrimination in making management decisions.

Ivanna Klympush-Tsintsadze, Vice-Prime-Minister for European and Euro-Atlantic Integration of Ukraine, stressed:

Gender equality in the country is the cornerstone of the sustainable development of any democratic society

National leaders, representatives of executive authorities, international organizations, embassies of USA, Great Britain, Sweden, France, Spain, Canada, Norway, Lithuania, NGOs and civil society activists, female military officers, businesswomen and also men who actively support gender equality were invited to the Congress.

=== 2019 ===
The third Ukrainian Women’s Congress took place on 10–11 December 2019 in Kyiv, becoming a platform for the high level discussion on equal rights and opportunities policies. The event brought together 700 participants from all over the world.

The Vice-Prime-Minister for European and Euro-Atlantic Integration of Ukraine Dmytro Kuleba, the Head of Ukrainian Parliament Dmytro Razumkov, Deputy-Head of Ukrainian Parliament Olena Kondratiuk, and the Head of the Supreme Court Valentyna Danishevska spoke at the Congress.

Olena Zelenska, the first lady of Ukraine, opened the event with the following statement:

As Margaret Thatcher said, who I believe was a great woman in global politics, If you want something said, ask a man; if you want something done, ask a woman. I think it means that only collaboration of men and women may lead a country to success

In her speech, the first lady of Ukraine expressed the idea of Ukraine joining the Biarritz Partnership, an international organization established at G7 summit in France.

Among the international speakers were Clare Hutchinson, the NATO Secretary General's Special Representative for Women, Peace and Security, Régis Brillat, the Special Adviser of the Secretary General of the Council of Europe for Ukraine, members of parliaments, representatives of foreign governments and embassies. The discussion raised the issues of engaging women in peacekeeping and security sectors, eliminating gender-based violence and stereotypes and strengthening gender-sensitive education.

=== 2020 ===
Ukrainian Women’s Congress took place online for the first time on 23 July 2020. National leaders, governmental officials, representatives of international organizations, embassies of other countries, responsible businesses and NGOs were invited to the Congress. Participants discussed the new challenges related to the COVID-19 epidemic and its impact on local elections in Ukraine, the role of political and civic leadership in fighting the pandemic and financial crisis.

== Regional Ukrainian Women’s Congresses ==
In 2018, the Ukrainian Women's Congress convened in Odesa and Lviv, and in 2019, in Mariupol. These events addressed regional gender equality issues and emphasized the challenges of ensuring equal opportunities for women at the local level.

The Ukrainian Women’s Congress in Odesa on May 18, 2018, brought together over 60 participants from Southern Ukraine to discuss local gender policy developments and tasks. Notable attendees included NDI Ukraine Senior Country Director Mary O'Hagan, First Deputy Head of the Verkhovna Rada Iryna Herashchenko, Ombudsman on the Restoration of Peace in Donetsk and Luhansk regions Alyona Babak, MPs Svitlana Voytsekhovska, Maria Ionova, and Olena Kondratiuk, Minister of Communities and Territories Development Hennadiy Zubko, and Head of the Odesa Region Maksym Stepanov.

The Congress in Lviv, held on September 28, 2018, saw the participation of over 100 individuals from Lviv, Ivano-Frankivsk, Ternopil, Chernivtsi, and Khmelnytsky regions. Participants from Donetsk, Zaporizhzhia, and Luhansk regions were invited to exchange experiences. Attendees included representatives from local communities and authorities, state institutions, and civil society. Key figures at the event were MPs Alyona Babak, Svitlana Voytsekhovska, Maria Ionova, and Olena Kondratiuk (co-founders of the Equal Opportunities inter-party caucus), MPs Iryna Podolyak and Oksana Yurynets, Vice-Prime-Minister for European and Euro-Atlantic Integration of Ukraine Ivanna Klympush-Tsintsadze, Head of the Lviv Region Oleh Synyutka, and the Mayor of Lviv Andriy Sadovyi.

On June 7, 2019, the Ukrainian Women’s Congress took place in Mariupol, initiated by the Equal Opportunities inter-party caucus. The event included 110 participants from Donetsk, Luhansk, Kharkiv, Zaporizhzhia, Kropyvnytskyi, Lviv, and other regions. Eighteen experienced speakers addressed pressing issues related to gender policy, equal rights for men and women in the security and defense sectors, gender quotas, and the creation of inclusive public spaces.
