= Tiszaeszlár =

Village in Szabolcs-Szatmár-Bereg Region, Hungary

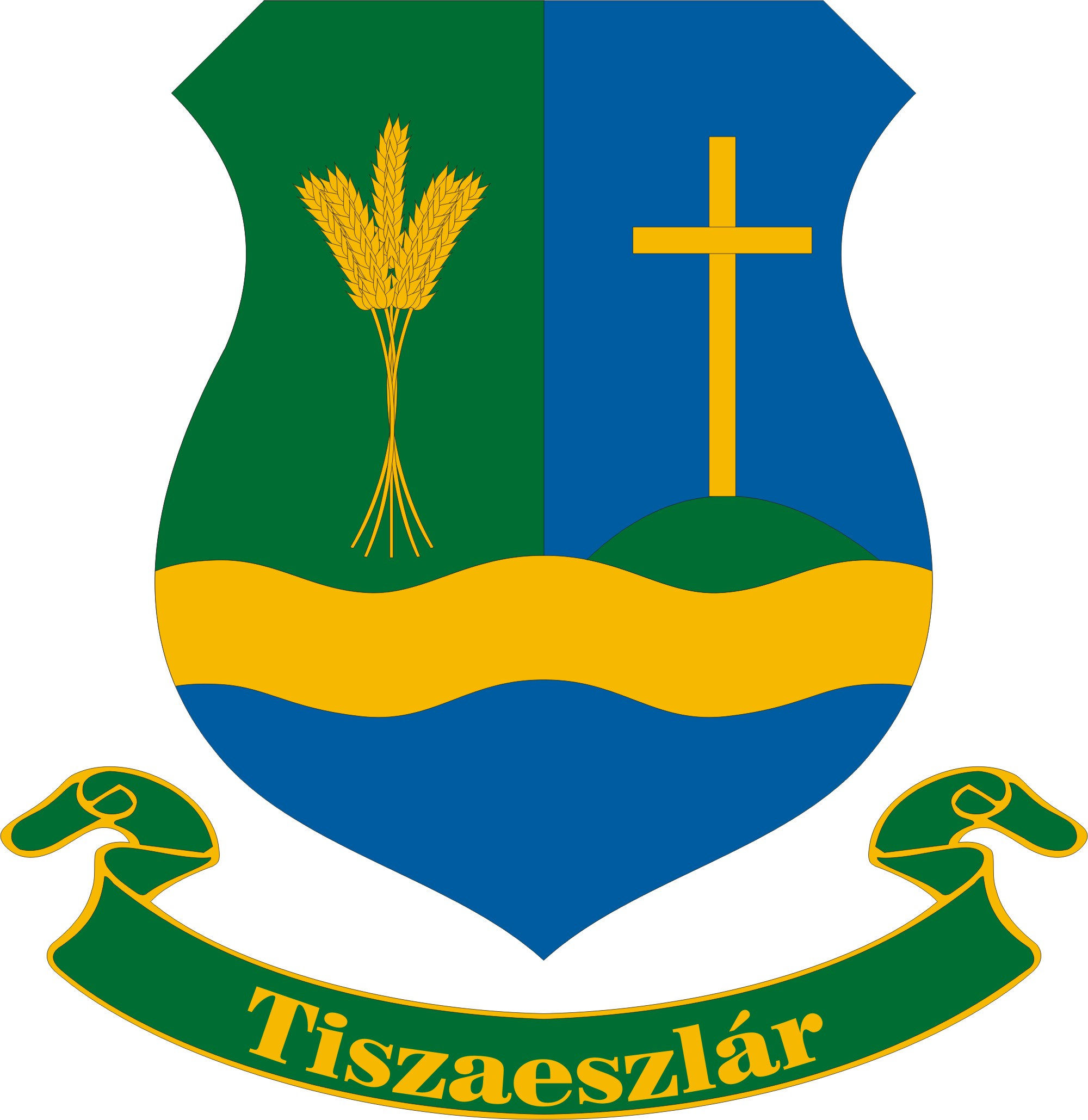
- Coat of arms

- Location of Tiszaeszlár in Hungary
- Coordinates: 48.05°N 21.47°E
- Country: Hungary
- Region: Northern Great Plain
- County: Szabolcs-Szatmár-Bereg

Area
  - Total: 54.56 km^{2} (21.07 sq mi)

Population (2012)
  - Total: 2,566
  - Density: 47.03/km^{2} (121.8/sq mi)
- Time zone: UTC+1 (CET)
  - Summer (DST): UTC+2 (CEST)
- Postal code: 4464
- Area code: +36 42
- Website: https://www.tiszaeszlar.hu/

Tiszaeszlár (Old form: Tisza-Eszlár) is a village in Szabolcs-Szatmár-Bereg, Hungary.

In 1882 the village was the centre of blood libel accusations against its Jewish community. They were accused of murdering and beheading a young girl. The accused were tortured by the authorities, but all were acquitted on trial.

== History ==
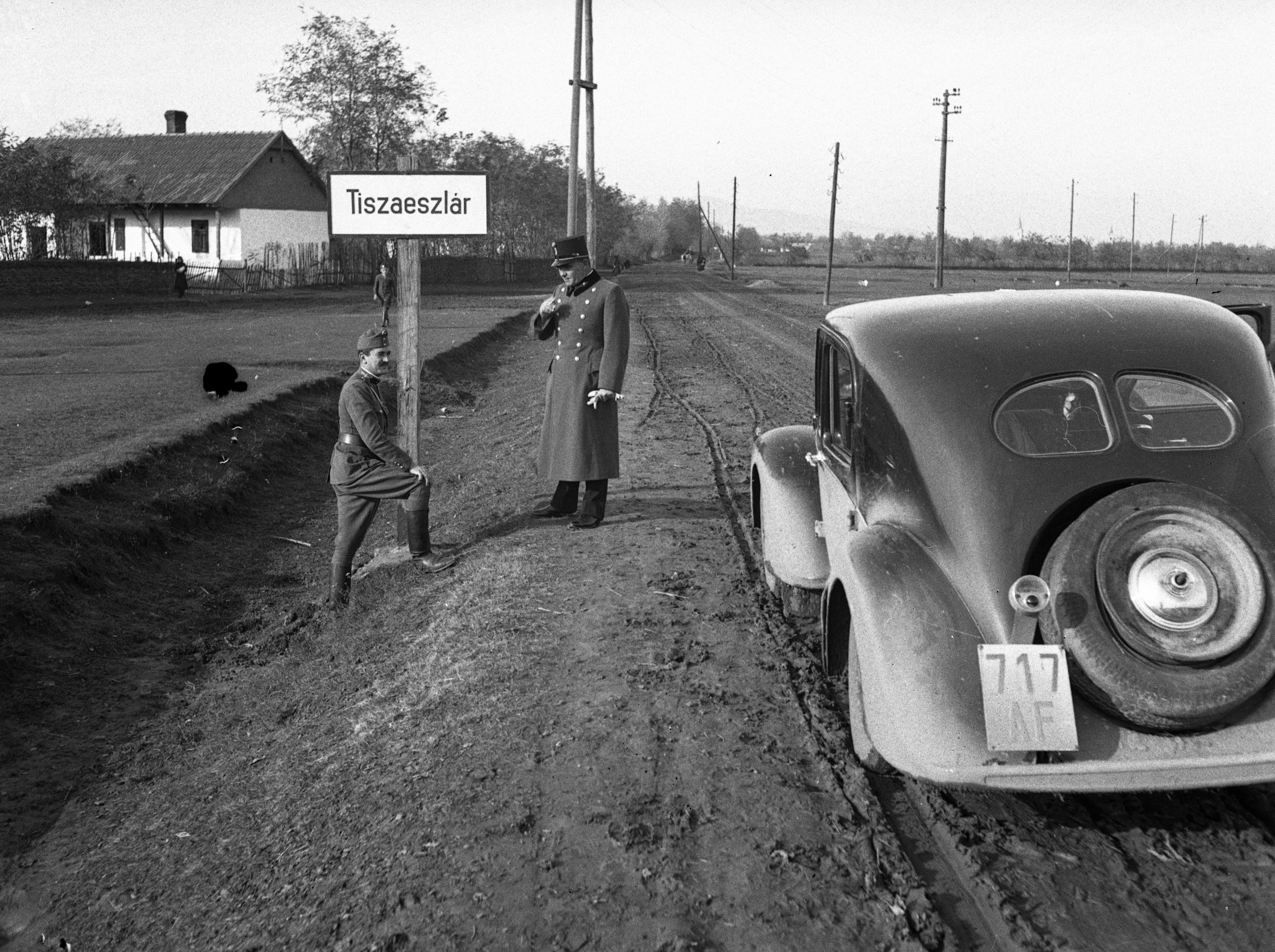
Old Picture - Tiszaeszlár, Hungary

Its first mention is from 1220. It was an ecclesiastical estate in Eger until 1261, when it was replaced by the Bishop of Eger Sándor Karászi for the estates around Eger. From the 14th to the 18th century, it was partially owned by several families (Biri, Doby, Lónyay, Sztritey, Újfalussy, Tatay, Chernel, Péchy, Ibrányi, Teleky, Zoltán), the longest of whom were the Kállayas. At the beginning of the 17th century, István Bocskai settled free Hajdús in the village, which was depopulated during the Turkish occupation and had only 49 inhabitants.

Due to the floods on the Tisza, the construction of Újfalu, south of Eszlár, called Ófalu, began to be built in 1858, to which the whole village moved by 1890, and is still located today.

In 1882, as a result of the lawsuit against Tiszaeszlár, the settlement became known to the public.

== Notable people ==
- Thekla Popov, mass murderer.

== See also ==
- Tiszaeszlár Affair
