= Mónika Lakatos =

Hungarian gypsy singer

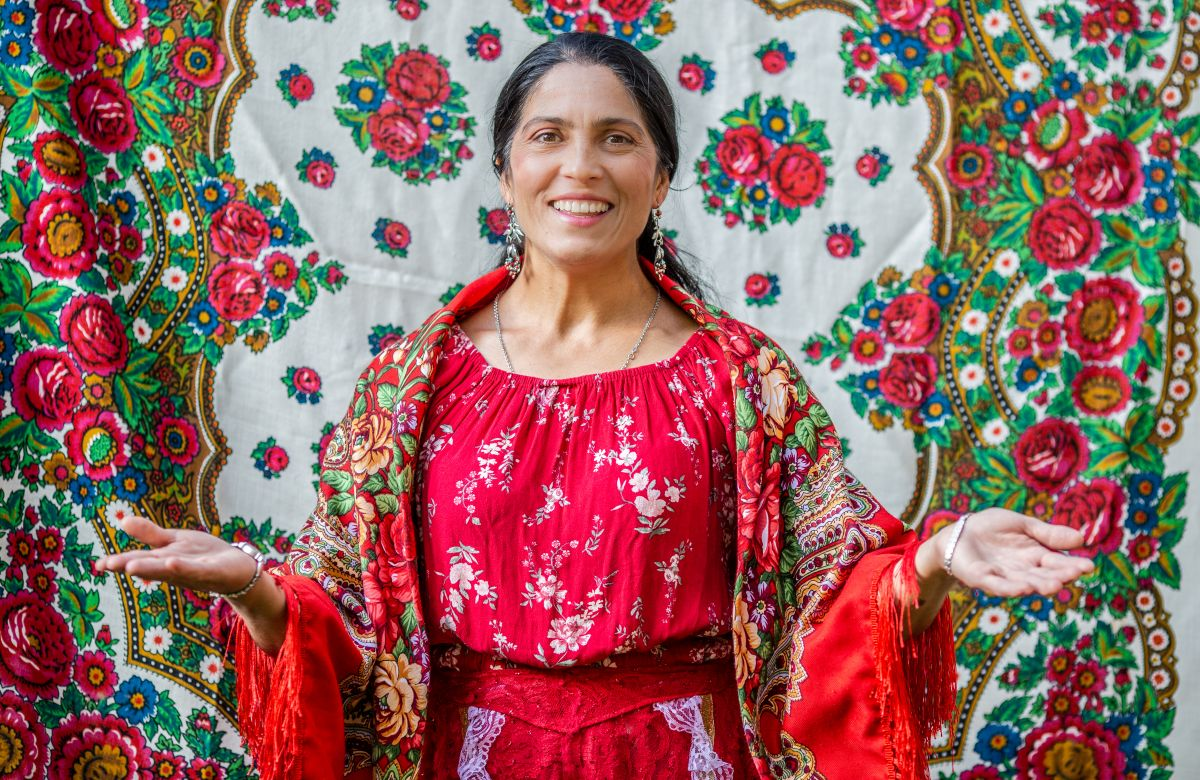
- Born: Budapest
- Occupation: singer
- Awards: WOMEX Award (2020)

Mónika Lakatos is a Hungarian Romani singer. She is the lead singer of the band Romengo. She became the first artist of Romani descent to receive the WOMEX Award in 2020.

== Life and career ==
Lakatos was born in Budapest in a Romani family and learnt to sing by herself. She frequently played at Holdvilág Studio Theatre with her cousins, where she met her future husband, Mihály "Mazsi" Rostás, who accompanied them on the guitar. The director of the theatre, István Malgot entered the band to the television talent show Ki mit tud? in 1996, without the members' knowledge. They appeared on the show named Lakatos Mónika és a Hold Gyermekei (Mónika Lakatos and the Children of the Moon) and won the folk music category. Not long after, her daughter, Dzseni, was born and she withdrew from singing for some time. Her husband became a member of the band Romano Drom, and Lakatos occasionally took to the stage with them. In 2004, she and her husband founded Romengo, which plays Romani music from Nagyecsed. They released two albums, both of which charted in the top 10 on the World Music Charts Europe.

In 2010, she sang a track for The Human Resources Manager, directed by Eran Riklis. In 2017, her solo album Romanimo charted fourth on the 2018 February chart of World Music Charts Europe, and finished 14th in the annual top list, selected by a jury.

== Discography ==
As a solo artist

- Romanimo (20 October 2017)
- Hangszín (Lakatos Mónika és a Cigány Hangok formation, 2020)

== Awards ==
- Anna Lindh Prize, 2007
- Parallel Culture Awards, 2013
- Nemzetiségekért Díj (For Ethnic Minorities Award), 2014
- WOMEX Awards, 2020
- Pro Cultura Minoritatum Hungariae Award, 2020
