= Tiszaeszlár affair =

1882–83 criminal case in Austria-Hungary

The Tiszaeszlár affair was originally a murder case which was represented in journals as a blood libel that led to a trial that set off antisemitic agitation in Austria-Hungary in 1882 and 1883. After a local 14-year-old girl, Eszter Solymosi, failed to return home on 1 April 1882, Jews were accused of murdering and beheading her. On 18 June 1882, a female body was found floating in the Tisza river near the town of Tiszadada. A lengthy trial followed, eventually resulting in the acquittal of all the accused.

== Origin of the accusation ==
On April 1, 1882, Eszter Solymosi, a 14-year-old Christian peasant girl disappeared. She was a servant in the home of András Huri in Tiszaeszlár, a Hungarian village situated on the Tisza river. She went on an errand from which she did not return. The search was fruitless. A rumor was circulated that the girl had become a victim of Jewish religious fanaticism.

Hungarian agitators, whose leaders, Géza Ónody, representative of Tiszaeszlár in the Hungarian Parliament, and Győző Istóczy, MP, proposed the expulsion of the Jews in the House of Deputies. They fomented the non-Jewish sections of the public against the Jewish sections of the public. This resulted in an outburst of bigotry, with number of violent acts and pogroms perpetrated by non-Jews against their Jewish neighbors.

They spread the charges, saying Jews murdered a girl in order to use human blood at Passover. In the Jewish calendar, during the year 1882, the Passover began 3 April and ended 10 April. On May 4th, the girl's mother accused a number of Jews, before the local judge, of the murder of her daughter. She urged him to initiate an investigation.

== Confessions of the Scharf children ==
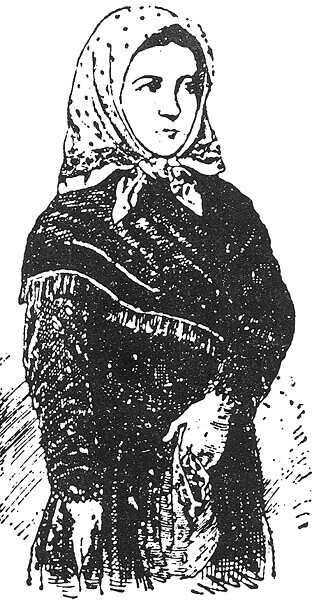
Eszter Solymosi

On May 19 the county court of Nyíregyháza sent the notary József Bary to act as examining judge at Tiszaeszlár. After having placed the suspected Jews under police surveillance, Bary met the five-year-old son of the synagogue sexton József Scharf, Samuel, to begin an inquiry. In Bary's interview, the boy stated that in the presence of his father and other men the slaughterer had made an incision in the girl's neck, and he and his brother Móric had received the blood in a plate. The father and Móric (who was nearly 14 years old) and the other suspected persons denied any knowledge of the disappearance of the girl and of her conjectured murder. On May 19 Scharf and his wife were arrested; Móric repeated his statement and said in addition he had not known anything about the missing girl, not even from hearsay. On the evening of that day Móric was given to Recsky, the commissar of safety, who took him to his country house in Tiszanagyfalu, where the court clerk, Péczely, received orders to watch over the boy's safety.

The boy confessed that after the Sabbath morning service his father called Eszter to his house under the pretext of requiring her to remove some candlesticks (an act forbidden to Jews on Saturdays); that a Jewish beggar, Hermann Wollner, who lodged with them, had led the girl to the vestibule of the synagogue and attacked her; and, after having undressed her, two slaughterers, Ábrahám Buxbaum and Leopold Braun, had held her while another slaughterer, Salamon Schwarz, incised her neck with a large knife and drained the blood onto 2 plates which were later emptied into a pot. These three men, applicants for the vacant position of preceptor and shoḥeṭ, came to Tiszaeszlár to officiate on that particular Sabbath, and had, as the boy said, remained in the synagogue after morning service. All this, according to his confession, Móric observed through the keyhole of the synagogue door. During the 45 minutes he thus stood on watch, he saw after the operation a rag was tied around the neck of the girl and her body dressed again, in the presence of Sámuel Lustig, Ábrahám Braun, Lázár Weisstein, and Adolf Jünger. The two conspirators Recsky and Péczely immediately sent for the examining judge Bary, before whom the same night Móric repeated his account, adding that after the perpetrators left the scene of their crime he had locked the synagogue, and that neither the corpse nor any blood marks were to be found. With feverish zeal Bary continued his investigations in the synagogue and houses and among the graves; but nowhere could any traces of the living or dead girl be discovered. Fifteen Jews were arrested on suspicion, and Móric Scharf was given in charge of the jailer.

On June 18 a body that the district physician declared to be of a 14-year-old girl was drawn out of the river Tisza near the village Dada. Her mother denied it was Eszter's corpse, although she afterward identified the clothes in which the body was found as those of her daughter. A committee of experts, two physicians and one surgeon, declared the corpse was of a girl 18 to 20 years of age who had met with her death eight or ten days before. It was then buried in the Catholic cemetery of Tiszaeszlár. The anti-Semitic agitators, among whom was the Catholic priest of the town, insinuated the body was smuggled in by the Jews and clothed in the garments of Eszter Solymosi in order to conceal the crime of ritual murder. Several of the craftsmen who found the body were induced by promises, threats, and cruel treatment to revoke their former testimony and to declare they brought the body to the river and an unknown Jewess had furnished them with the clothes in which they dressed it.

== Making of formal accusations ==
On July 29 formal accusations were made against fifteen persons, as follows: Salamon Schwarz, Ábrahám Buxbaum, Leopold Braun, and Hermann Wollner, of murder; József Scharf, Adolf Jünger, Ábrahám Braun, Sámuel Lustig, Lázár Weisstein, and Emánuel Taub, of voluntary assistance in the crime; Anselm Vogel, Jankel Smilovics, David Hersko, Martin Gross, and Ignác Klein, of abetting the crime and smuggling the body. By order of the government, Móric Scharf was under the control of the district bailiff, who placed him in the custody of the warden Henter, and thus removed from contact with the other defendants and other Jews.

The accused were defended by Károly Eötvös, journalist and member of the House of Deputies, with whom were associated the advocates B. Friedmann, Sándor Funták, Max Székely of Budapest, and Ignác Heumann of Nyíregyháza, the seat of the county court before which the case was tried. In a petition to Minister of Justice Pauler, Eötvös protested against the system of torture practised by Bary, Recsky, and Péczely, but this protest had little effect upon the official. The affair was so long drawn out that State Attorney Kozma of Budapest went to Nyíregyháza in September to speed up the examination.

== Eszter's corpse exhumed ==
In the middle of November the wife of József Scharf was set free, while her husband and the other prisoners were being still detained. At the request of the defending lawyers the body found in the Tisza was exhumed (December 7) and reexamined by three professors of medicine at the University of Budapest – Schenthauer, Belky, and Mihalkovics. They found that the opinion of the members of the former committee of examination had no scientific basis, and later, before the court, they taxed them with gross ignorance: the body was too much decayed to allow a positive judgment. The fact the corpse was not claimed by any one left no doubt in their opinion, however, that it was that of Eszter Solymosi; and as the neck was not cut, no ritual murder could have been committed.

On June 17, 1883, the last act in this affair began before the court of Nyíregyháza. Judge Ferenc Korniss presided, Eduard Szeyffert acting as state attorney. Although the testimony of Móric Scharf was the only basis of the accusation, the court held thirty sessions to examine the case in all its details, and many witnesses were heard. The glaring contradictions of the boy despite the careful training he received, and the falsity of his accusation as exposed by a local inspection of the alleged scene of the murder made by the court in Tiszaeszlár on July 16, resulted in the unanimous acquittal of the accused (August 3). Szalay, the attorney for the widow Solymosi, in a speech full of bitter invectives, appealed against the decision; but the supreme court rejected his appeal and confirmed the verdict of the county court.

The youthful accuser, Móric Scharf had to go into exile to Amsterdam.

== Acquittal of the accused ==
The acquittal and release of the prisoners, most of whom had languished in prison for 15 months, were the signal for uprisings in Pozsony, Budapest, and other parts of Hungary, except for Tiszaeszlár. The spectators who thronged the court-house during the sessions, and of whom Onody, the representative of Tiszaeszlár in the House of Deputies, was the most conspicuous, conducted themselves scandalously during the proceedings, insulting the prisoners and threatening the witnesses and counsel for the defence.

== Unresolved cause of death ==
The body found floating in the Tisza River dressed in Eszter Solymosi's clothes was devoid of any outward signs of trauma. The Budapest pathologists that performed the second autopsy communicated with Dr. Carl Toldt, a pathologist in Prague who had access to the skeleton of a 14-year-old girl for comparison. Dr. Toldt observed that the ossification pattern of the body found floating in the Tisza River and that of the skeleton of the 14-year-old girl in Prague showed no perceptible differences. The actual cause of Eszter Solymosi's death was never established.

== See also ==
- Blood libel against Jews
- The Austrian 1948 film Der Prozeß which was based on these events.
- Arnold Zweig's 1915 surrealist tragedy Ritualmord in Ungarn is based on these events.
- The YIVO Encyclopedia of Jews in Eastern Europe Hillel J. Kieval: Tiszaeszlár Blood Libel
- The novel "Dance with a dead maid" by Slovak author Juraj Bindzár

== Sources ==
- Allg. Zeit. des Jud. 1882–83, 1884, p. 248;
- Die Neuzeit, 1882–83;
- Der Blutprozess von Tisza Eszlar in Ungarn: Vorgeschichte der Auflage und vollständiger Bericht über die Prozess-Verhandlungen vor dem Gerichte in Nyiregyháza. New York: Schnitzer Brothers, 1883;
- Paul Nathan, Der Prozess von Tisza-Eszlar. Ein antisemitisches Culturbild, Berlin, 1892.
- Eötvös Károly: A nagy per, Budapest, 1904.
- Krúdy Gyula: A tiszaeszlári Solymosi Eszter, Budapest, 1975. (2nd ed.)
- János Desi (2014), "An Old_New Story: The continued existence of the Tiszaeszlar blood libel", in François Guesnet; Gwen Jones (eds.), Antisemitism in an Era of Transition, Peter Lang, ISBN 9783631646298
- Nemes, Robert (2007). "Hungary's Antisemitic Provinces: Violence and Ritual Murder in the 1880s". Slavic Review. 66 (1): 20–44. doi:10.2307/20060145. ISSN 0037-6779. JSTOR 20060145. S2CID 159811880.
- Hamann, David. David Hamann: Ein Billett von Brody über Berlin nach New York: Organisierte Solidarität deutscher Juden für osteuropäische jüdische Transmigrant*innen 1881/82 (= Europäisch-jüdische Studien Bd. 67), p. 194-240 (Berlin, Boston: De Gruyter Oldenbourg 2023).
