= Táplánszentkereszt =

- Location of Táplánszentkereszt
- Coordinates: 47.19734°N 16.69968°E
- Country: Hungary
- County: Vas

Area
  - Total: 20.08 km^{2} (7.75 sq mi)

Population (2004)
  - Total: 2,409
  - Density: 119.97/km^{2} (310.7/sq mi)
- Time zone: UTC+1 (CET)
  - Summer (DST): UTC+2 (CEST)
- Postal code: 9761
- Area code: 94

Táplánszentkereszt is a village in Vas county, Hungary. As of 2001, the population was 2,389. It was created through joining seven villages along the banks of a stream. Well-known figures born in Táplánszentkereszt include Győző Istóczy and Kálmán Széll.

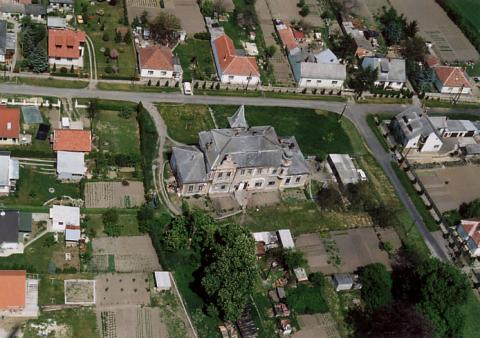
Táplánszenkereszt from above
