= Roma Education Fund =

Non-governmental organization

- Founded: May 12, 2005
- Founder: Open Society Foundations; World Bank
- Type: Non-profit organization
- Headquarters: Budapest, Hungary
- Key people: Ciprian Necula, Executive Chair
- Website: www.romaeducationfund.org

The Roma Education Fund (REF) is a non-governmental organization established within the framework of the Decade of Roma Inclusion by Open Society Foundations (formerly Open Society Institute) and the World Bank in 2005.

== History ==
In July 2003, a conference "Roma in an Expanding Europe: Challenges for the Future", co-financed by the Open Society Institute, was held in Budapest. The conference resolved to establish the Decade of Roma Inclusion and the Roma Education Fund.

== European Court of Human Rights cases ==
In 2007, research and observations by the Roma Education Fund were cited in the decision of the landmark case of D.H. and Others v Czech Republic concerning the discrimination of Romani children in the Czech educational system. REF noted the high incidence of placing children into special schools in the Czech Republic compared with other Central and Eastern European countries, the lack of a national definition of "disability" in countries within the region, and the negative effects of special schools on educational achievement.
