= Nagyecsed =

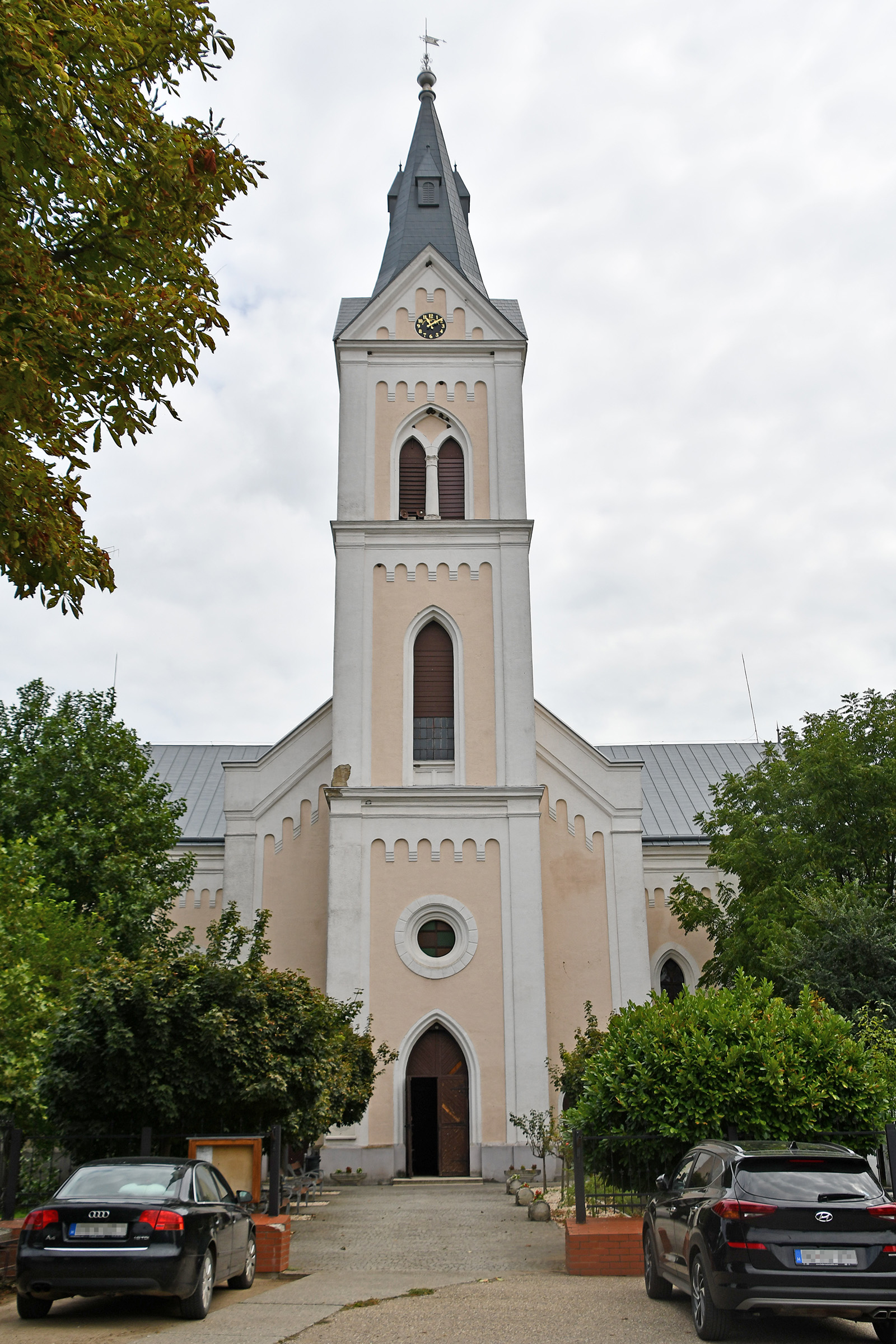
- Great Reformed church in Nagyecsed.

- Flag Coat of arms

- Location within Hungary
- Coordinates: 47°52′N 22°24′E
- Country: Hungary
- County: Szabolcs-Szatmár-Bereg

Government
  - Mayor: Kovács Lajos (Ind.)

Area
  - Total: 43.85 km^{2} (16.93 sq mi)

Population (2022)
  - Total: 5,927
  - Density: 135.2/km^{2} (350.1/sq mi)
- Time zone: UTC+1 (CET)
  - Summer (DST): UTC+2 (CEST)
- Postal code: 4355
- Area code: 44
- Website: www.nagyecsed.hu

Nagyecsed is a town in Szabolcs-Szatmár-Bereg county, in the Northern Great Plain region of eastern Hungary. Home to the powerful Hungarian House of Bathory.

The old name of the town was Ecsed but over time it has been renamed Nagyecsed, meaning "grand" or "great Ecsed" to distinguish it. The area had close associations with a cadet branch of the Báthory family. Elizabeth Báthory was raised in the town's now ruined castle. Her main residence and later her prison was Csejte Castle, Upper Hungary, now in Slovakia, but she was buried in the family crypt at Ecsed, Hungary.

The town's castle was demolished in the eighteenth century after the Kuruc uprisings.

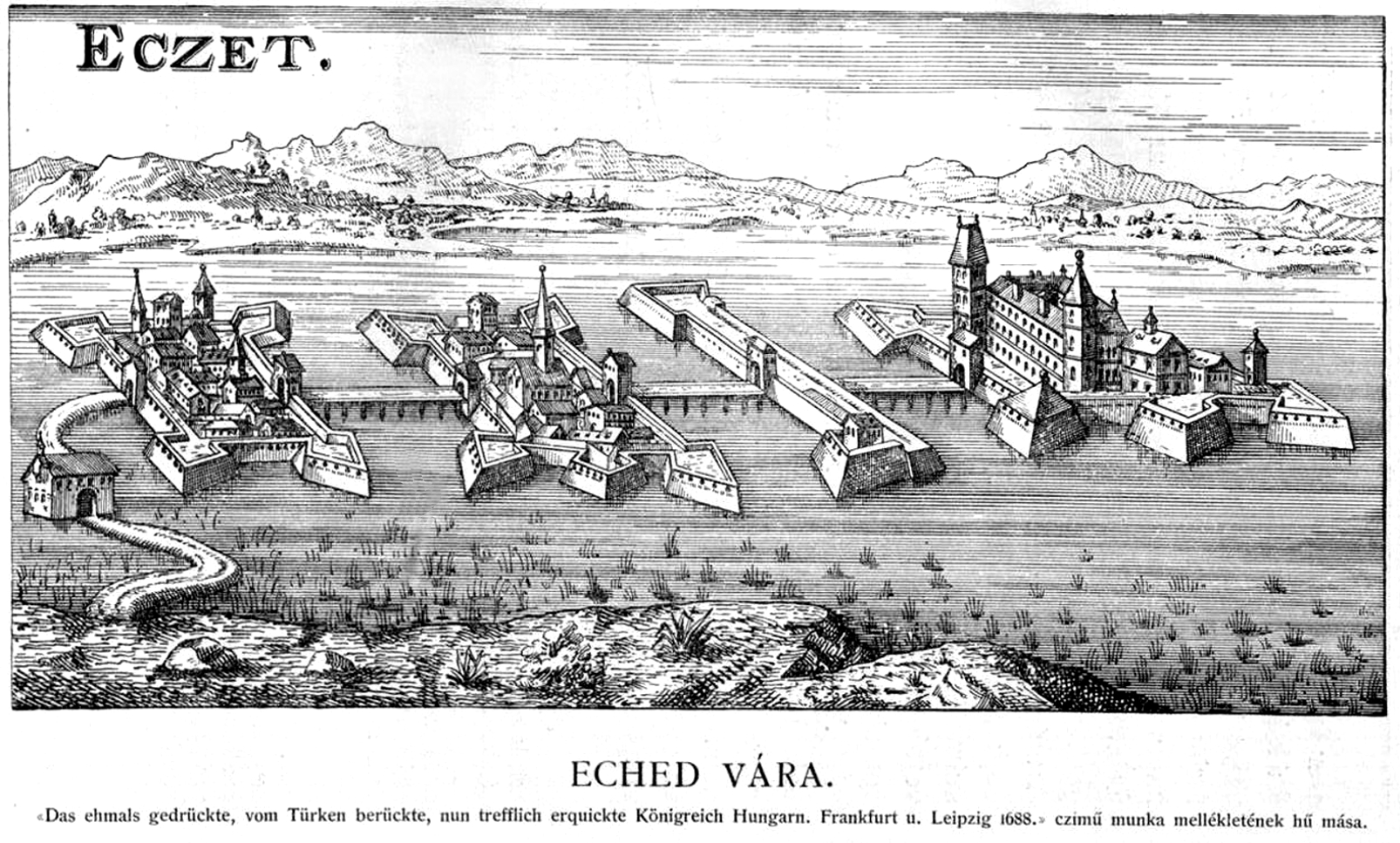
Ecsed, the lake and the old castle

== Geography ==
It covers an area of 43.85 km^{2} (17 sq mi) and has a population of 5,927 people (2022).

The town is divided in two by the Crasna River. It formerly lay north west of the Ecsed Marsh (Ecsedi-láp), which was the largest contiguous marshland of the Great Hungarian Plain. As part of water control operations by Tibor Károlyi this was drained in the late nineteenth century, and the lands thus reclaimed transformed into farmland.

== Notable people ==
- Guszti Bódi (born 1958), a Lovari Romani, Gypsy, Hungarian musician, composer and singer
- Elizabeth Báthory (1560–1614) Hungarian countess and alleged serial killer
