= Balada de um Batráquio =

Balada de um Batráquio (en: Batrachian's Ballad) is a Portuguese short documentary, directed and written by Leonor Teles in 2016. It won the Golden Bear at the Berlin Film Festival and the Firebird Award for best short film at the Hong Kong International Film Festival.

== Plot ==
The documentary addresses the tradition of placing ceramic frogs in commercial spaces as a way to ward off gypsies. Just like the gypsies, the ceramic frogs don't go unnoticed by a more attentive eye, and thus emerge in an ambiguous context. The film is a way of creating a fable about xenophobic behavior.

== Awards ==
- Short Film Golden Bear at the Berlin International Film Festival (2016);
- Capivara Trophy for Best International Short Film at the Belo Horizonte International Film Festival (2016);
- Golden Firebird Award in the Short Film Competition of the Hong Kong International Film Festival (2016);
- Revelation Award at the Caminhos do Cinema Português Film Festival (2016);
- Sophia Award for Best Short Film Documentary at the Portuguese Film Academy Sophia Awards (2017);
- Amnesty International Award - Special Mention at the IndieLisboa International Independent Film Festival (2016);
