= Sandra Jayat =

French writer and artist (1930–2025)

- Jayat in 1967, on cover of EP "Il ne faut pas" (plus 3 other songs/poems)
- Born: Lucienne Jayat; 13 May 1930; Moulins, France
- Died: 19 February 2025 (aged 94); Paris, France
- Occupations: Poet, Author, Visual artist
- Writing career
- Genres: Surrealism, Cubism

Sandra Jayat (13 May 1930 (?) – 19 February 2025) was a French writer and artist of Romani descent. She left her nomadic family at age 15. She travelled on her own to Italy and Paris. She became associated with the surviving family of Django Reinhardt. In Paris, she was encouraged by the writers Marcel Aymé and Jean Cocteau, plus as an artist by Chagall and Picasso. She published many works of literature documenting the experience of Romanies in France and has advocated on behalf of Roma and Sinti at the international level, and is a recognized artist whose work has featured in well regarded exhibitions. She resided in Paris up to her death.

== Early life ==
According to her own account as represented by Begoña Barrera, 2022 (see Bibliography for details), Jayat was born "somewhere between two countries" (i.e. Italy and France) "between 1938 and 1939", although for reasons that are unclear, her official notice of death lists her date and place of birth as 13 May 1930 at Moulins, Allier, France; the same details are apparently also given in "Who's Who in France" (original not seen). The reason for this discrepancy is presently unknown. (The Benezit Dictionary of Artists, 2006 edition gives her date of birth as 13 May 1939, so it is possible that the 1930 version is a simple error; alternatively, the 1930 date may be correct, however photographs of Jayat from the 1960s are consistent with a younger age (early to late 20s) rather than an older one (early to late 30s), refer this discussion on the "DjangoBooks" forum, also her account of seeking out and finding Django Reinhardt's surviving family in Paris at age 16 in 1955 would not be tenable since she would already be 25 by that time under the "birth year 1930" scenario).

Jayat's family were Manouche Roma who were transiting at the time from Italy to France to escape the wartime persecution of Roma that was occurring in Italy. Finding that Roma were equally persecuted in northern France in the same period, the family moved on to southern France where conditions were less severe, and by the time Sandra was 14 were to be found back in north Italy in the Lombardy region, specifically in an encampment on the banks of Lake Maggiore.

Again according to her own account via Barrera, on the eve of her fifteenth birthday it was announced that in accordance with the clan tradition she would be married to another Roma boy. The prospect terrified her and she decided to run away. Her grandfather had told her of the clan's "cousin", Django Reinhardt, a famous Romani guitarist, who lived in Paris, and she resolved to travel on her own to Paris in order to try to find him. The young girl traveled on her own overland to Paris over a period of many months, surviving, despite many hostilities, via the assistance of other Roma encampments along the way plus the kindness of strangers on occasion.

Upon her arrival in Paris in spring 1955 she discovered that Django had in fact died two years previously. However, she encountered a Jewish family of whom the mother had lost a child in a concentration camp during the second world war and who believed that Jayat was her child who had come back to her, and Jayat lived with this family until she could not stand the deception any longer. She claimed to have eventually made contact with Django's surviving family and to have been accepted as an honorary daughter by the family, (Note: Additional evidence of Jayat's close relationship with the surviving Reinhardt family includes a photograph stated to be from the early 1960s of Jayat (with a guitar) together with Django's widow Naguine, reproduced in Barrera, 2022, p. 56; her remarks in the film interview from 1972 that it was Naguine's suggestion that she subsequently record her poetry to earlier recordings of Reinhardt's music; and the dedication of one of her poems to "her close friend Babik, son of Django" (Barrera, 2022, p. 60).) maintaining her connection with the family for a number of years.

== Career ==
Although she spoke two languages (Italian and Romani) at the time she arrived in Paris, she soon taught herself French. Jayat was unable to read and write at that point, since the children of the clan had never attended school; however, over the next few years she taught herself to read and write in French and began to write poetry. She also began to produce drawings/paintings, which caused her to come to the attention of prominent Parisian writers and artists of the day, the latter including Picasso and Chagall, her early work somewhat resembling that of the latter artist in particular.

=== Writing ===
In 1961 she published a book of her poems entitled Herbes manouches ("Manouche Grass") (Note: A sentence from one of her works says, in translation, "I wish I had the power to transform into wild grass to grow freely") with a cover design provided by the poet and visual artist Jean Cocteau with a preface by the French author J.-B. Cayeux; a second collection entitled Lunes nomades ("Nomad Moons") appeared in 1963, and a third Moudravi: où va l'amitié ("Moudravi: Where Friendship Goes") in 1966, including a cover designed by Marc Chagall.

She also showcased the work of others, co-presenting (with Jean-Pierre Rosnay) a 1963 volume entitled Poèmes pour ce temps (Poems for This Time) which featured the work of other young Parisian writers. While, in the words of Barrera, her first two volumes of poetry contained a sequence of images about Romani life and customs, her third volume was "a much more profound humanistic reflection on personal relations".

In the 1970s she produced two stories for children, Kourako and Les deux lunes de Savyo ("The Two Moons of Savyo"). In the words of Barrera:

These tales for children told stories of young Romanies who left their camps to go on a journey, the first in search of a magic guitarist who lived in the midst of nature, the second to reach "the moon of the Tziganes". In both cases, the figure of the Gypsy was a sublimation of positive aspects of her culture that Jayat also considered to be defining characteristics: the desire for freedom as the driving force of life, music as a form of emotional expression of the people, the connection with and respect for nature as a fundamental principle and the notion of "the journey" – individual or collective – as a means of learning and personal growth.

Commencing in 1978, she produced four partly autobiographical novels: La Longue Route d'une Zingarina (The long road of a Zingarina) (1978), El romanes (The Romani elder) (1986), Les Racines du temps (The roots of time) (1998) and La Zingarina ou l'herbe sauvage (The Zingarina in the wild grass) (2010). Of her 1978 book, Barrera López wrote in 2020:

this 1978 book was both an autobiographical fictional story and an exercise in reflection on her own transformation process since she left the camp at the age of fifteen until the crossing of the border with France months later. Probably the most striking and defining aspect of La longue route d'une Zingarina is the description of the feelings that Jayat makes of Stellina, protagonist of the story and alter ego of the writer, whose path to France soon loses the meaning of flight and becomes a form of initiation journey.

El romanès recounted the adventures of Romanino "El Romanès", a Spanish Romani man, during World War II, while regarding her next novel:

Les Racines du temps was a youthful tale in which an older and wise man, Ribeiro Verde, told a child, Maggio, the story of Libèra, a young gypsy girl whose adventures were the subject of the book. With the introduction of gypsies of various nationalities as main or secondary characters in these stories (Libèra's meeting with his friends Solaro "le Gitano", Livio "le Manouche", Tomass "le Gypsy" and Vassile "le Rom" was especially eloquent), the writer portrayed a cosmopolitan and transnational gypsy world in which the roads and the camps of other gypsies (not the cities) were meeting places.

Finally, in La Zingarina ou l'herbe sauvage, the writer again recounted the story of her own life (as "Stellina") commencing with her escape from her encampment as a result of her refusal to marry and extended this time to her first years in Paris, this time in a text aimed at adults rather than children. Regarding this work, Barrera López wrote:

In La Zingarina ou l'herbe sauvage the interest in the transnational dimension of their culture, the possibility of dialogue between gypsies and non-gypsies, and the respective understanding from the difference was placed in the center of the story ... In this new book, Jayat even reserved a space to resume the history of the Nazi persecution of the gypsies, but now linking it to that also suffered by the Jews ... her own life was presented as an inexhaustible source for extracting stories that demonstrated the possibility, and above all the duty, of establishing a dialogue with other forms of life that would foster mutual enrichment.

=== Art ===
Simultaneous with her development as a writer, Jayat was also exploring the world of painting, being guided among others by Henri Mahé (1907–1975) as well as by gallery owner Émile Adès who from the early 1970s onwards exhibited her work alongside that of Chagall, Salvador Dalí and others. Her early artistic style has been described as "an innocently abstract, unassuming style ... inhabiting two, apparently contradictory states, dream and reality, which merge in the Surreal", while later works included some influences from cubism. An entry for her in "Benezit Dictionary of Artists" states:

She creates a picture by cutting into planes of gay, brilliant colours, producing part abstract, part figurative images connected with music, with travel and with the fortunes of her own Romany people. Over these she scatters a variety of signs and symbols."

According to Benezit's Dictionary, Jayat's work has been shown in collective exhibitions in 1983 and ongoing, and in solo exhibitions (1964-1992) in Paris, Trouville, Venice and Liège.

In 1985 Jayat co-organized the first international exhibition of Roma art in Paris, the "Première Mondiale D'art Tzigane".

In 1992 she painted a work entitled "Les gens du voyage" (the Travelling People) which was used as the design for a French postage stamp of denomination 2.5 NFR. In 2002, she created drawings for a set of 24 tarot cards which were published as Tarot Manouche: Universel du XXIè Siecle (21st Century Universal Manouche Tarot).

=== Music ===
In the mid-1960s, Jayat began frequenting a venue on Paris, the Pleint Vent Club, which on its ground floor offered a bookstore and an exhibition hall, while its 13th-century vaulted basement offered a performance space for jazz and flamenco music; among these performances, Jayat presented recitations of her poetry accompanied by her friends Babik Reinhardt and Cérani (Jean Mailhes). She later met regularly with friends and acquaintances from the world of music, art and literature at the Adlon Club. (Note: From Barrera López, 2020: The place that housed the Adlon in the sixties is [now] a real estate agency run by the son of the former owners of the Club. On its walls it preserves a framed text that says "1968. Dans ce lieu même, Sandra Jayat, peintre, Romancière, Poète, organisa des soirées parrainées par: Louis Aragon, Roger Caillois, Pierre Seghers, Marcel Ayme, Jean Cocteau, Philippe Soupault. C'était le temps des libertés insatiables à 'L'Adlon Club'. Côté nuit, la vie s'éclairait et des mots se déchaînaient. C'était le temps des amitiés, des poemes et des couleurs".)

Following up her initial public performances, in 1967, Jayat recorded several songs (4 per disc), released on French Vogue as 2 EPs entitled "Il Ne Faut Pas (7-inch EP, 1967) and "Le Malentendu Millenaire" (7-inch EP, 1968). She also released a single "Chante Django Reinhardt" in 1972 which comprised her singing/reciting 2 songs/poems ("C'est Le Jour De Noel" and "Comme L'Eau Claire") over previous instrumental recordings by (late period) Django Reinhardt and quintet performing "Minor Swing" and "Tears", respectively; according to her sole known filmed interview, she was encouraged to release these creations by Django's widow, Naguine, with whom she had earlier formed a friendship.

== Personal life and death ==
Jayat resided in Paris and died there on 19 February 2025, aged 94 according to her official notice of death, or alternatively, in her mid 80s if a c.1939 birth date is considered more plausible (refer discussion above).

== Works by Sandra Jayat ==
=== Poems (anthologies) ===
- Herbes manouches (Manouche Grass), Paris, la Colombe, Éditions du Vieux Colombier, 1961
- Lunes nomades (Nomad moons), Paris, P. Seghers, 1963
- Moudravi où va l'amitié (Moudravi where does friendship go), illustration by Marc Chagall, Paris, Seghers, 1966
- Je ne suis pas née pour suivre (I was not born to follow), Edition Philippe Auzou, 1983

=== Stories ===
- Les Deux lunes de Savyo (The Two Moons of Savyo) (1972) drawings by Jean-Paul Barthe
- Kourako (1972) illustrations by Jean-Paul Barthe
- Le Roseau d'argent (The silver reed) (1973)

=== Novels ===
- La Longue Route d'une Zingarina (The long road of a Zingarina), illustrations by Giovanni Giannini, Paris, Bordas, 1978 ISBN 2-04-010116-0
- El romanes (The Romanis), Paris, Magnard, 1986 ISBN 2-210-97106-3
- Les Racines du temps (The roots of time), Cergy-Pontoise, Éd. Points de suspension, 1998 ISBN 2-912138-08-6
- La Zingarina ou l'herbe sauvage (The Zingarina in the wild grass), Paris, Max Milo, 2010 ISBN 9782353410972

=== Other ===
- Tarot Manouche: Universel du XXIè Siecle (21st Century Universal Manouche Tarot). Sandra Jayat, 2002

=== Recordings ===
==== By Sandra Jayat ====
- Il Ne Faut Pas (7-inch, EP) - RCA Victor, 1967
- Le Malentendu Millenaire (7-inch, EP) - RCA Victor, 1968
- Chante Django Reinhardt (7-inch, Single) - Vogue, 1972

==== By others ====
- Suzanne Gabriello, Suzanne Gabriello, Unidisc UD 30 1257, 1974. Songs of Sandra Jayat, music by Jean-Pierre-Lang, with the participation of Petits Chanteurs d'Île-de-France directed by Jean Amoureux.
- Yves Mourousi, Sandra Jayat, La Pastorale des Gitans, Unidisc UD 30 1307, 1976. Five songs of Sandra Jayat (Serani Maille (guitar), Raymond Guyot, Ennio Morricone).
- Elisabeth Wiener, Manitas de Plata – Kourako Or La Guitare Aux Cordes D'Or, Arion OP 105, Canada, LP. 19?? Elisabeth Wiener reads Jayat's children's story "Kourako" with guitar accompaniment by Manitas de Plata.

== Awards ==
She was awarded a silver medal by the City of Paris in 1984 and a silver-gilt medal in 1992. Laurent-Fahier, 1991 states that other awards include Grand Prix de La littérature enfantine in 1972, the gold medal of la Fondation internationale des écrivains, peintres, poètes et journalistes in 1976, the Prix International de peinture Toulouse-Lautrec in 1977, the Grand Prix du livre in Stockholm in 1978, and the gold medal of l'Institut supérieur international des Études humanistes in 1980.

== Bibliography ==
- Daphne Maurice, 1973. "Sandra Jayat. The Gypsy Poetess". Journal of the Gypsy Lore Society 3, 52, pp. 91–93. Accessed 30 December 2022
- Sandra Jayat, 1985: "Introduction", in Première Mondiale d’Art Tzigane. La Conciergerie, Paris, du 6 mai au 30 mai 1985 [Exhibition catalogue] (Paris)
- Ariette Laurent-Fahier, 1991. "Sandra Jayat: un destin exceptionnel". Créations 52: 20–24. Accessed 30 December 2022
- Exposition Sandra Jayat, peintre manouche (Exhibition "Sandra Jayat, gypsy painter"), City of Marcoussis, March 25 to Saturday April 11, 2009: description at https://www.arts-spectacles.com/25-mars-au-11-avril-exposition-Sandra-Jayat-peintre-manouche-mediatheque-de-Marcoussis-91_a1783.html
- Benezit Dictionary of Artists, 2006 edition, volume 7: Herring - Koornstra. Gründ, Paris, 2006. ISBN 270003077X (S. Jayat entry on p. 776). Accessed 30 December 2022
- Tímea Junghaus & Katalin Székely (eds), 2006: "Meet Your Neighbours: Contemporary Roma Art from Europe" (English Translation). Open Society Institute, ISBN 9639419990.
- Begoña Barrera López, 2020: "Sandra Jayat. Construir y dignificar la diferencia" (Sandra Jayat. Constructing and Dignifying Difference) [in Spanish]. Arenal 27(2): 531–557. DOI:10.30827/arenal.v27i2.6533. Accessed 30 December 2022
- Begoña Barrera, 2022: "The Long Road in Search of a Tzigane Language: Sandra Jayat". pp. 53–70 in Eve Rosenhaft and María Sierra (eds), European Roma Lives Beyond Stereotypes (Liverpool). Accessed 30 December 2022
