= Decade of Roma Inclusion =

Decade of Roma Inclusion logo

The Decade of Roma Inclusion (Romani: Deshbersh le Romengo Anderyaripnasko) was an initiative of 12 European countries to improve the socio-economic status and social inclusion of the Romani people across the region. The initiative was launched in 2005, with the project running from 2005 to 2015, and was the first multinational project in Europe to actively enhance the lives of Roma.

The countries that took part in the project were: Albania, Bosnia and Herzegovina, Bulgaria, Croatia, Czech Republic, Hungary, Macedonia, Montenegro, Romania, Serbia, Slovakia, and Spain. All of these countries have significant Romani minorities, which have been rather disadvantaged, both economically and socially. Slovenia and the United States maintained observer status.

The governments of the above countries have committed to closing the gap in welfare and living conditions between the Roma and non-Roma populations, as well as putting an end to the cycle of poverty and exclusion that many Roma find themselves in. Each of these countries has developed an action plan that specifies goals and indicators in the project's priority areas: education, employment, health and housing.

The founding international partner organizations of the project are the World Bank, the Open Society Institute, the United Nations Development Program (UNDP), the Council of Europe (CoE), CoE's Development Bank (CEB), the Contact Point for Roma and Sinti Issues of the Office for Democratic Institutions and Human Rights (ODIHR) of the Organization for Security and Co-operation in Europe (OSCE), the European Roma Information Office, the European Roma and Travellers Forum, the European Roma Rights Centre and the Roma Education Fund. The United Nations Human Settlements Programme (UN–HABITAT), the Office of the United Nations High Commissioner for Refugees (UNHCR), and the United Nations Children's Fund (UNICEF) became partners in the Decade in 2008, and the World Health Organization (WHO) became a partner in 2011.

The Roma Education Fund (REF), a central component of the initiative, was established in 2005 with the mission of expanding educational opportunities for Romani communities in Central and Southeastern Europe. REF's goal is to contribute to closing the gap in educational outcomes between Roma and non-Roma through a variety of policies and programs, including desegregation of educational systems. REF receives funds from governments, multilateral organizations and private sources. It finances projects that are proposed and implemented by governments, non-governmental organizations and private organizations.

Planning for the project was guided by the International Steering Committee (ISC), which was composed of representatives of the participating governments, international partner organizations and Romani organizations. Each year, one of the participating governments holds the project's presidency.
