= Eldra Jarman =

Welsh harpist and author (1917–2000)

- Born: Eldra Mary Roberts; September 4, 1917; Aberystwyth, Wales
- Died: September 23, 2000 (aged 83); Pontypridd, Wales
- Occupations: Harpist, writer

Eldra Mary Jarman (born Eldra Mary Roberts; 4 September 1917 – 24 September 2000) was a Welsh harpist and writer.

Jarman had south Asian heritage as she was a Kale (Welsh Roma) harpist and author. She is known for the books she researched on the Welsh Romani heritage and her knowledge of the triple harp. Her memoirs were made into a film.

== Early life ==
Jarman was born on 4 September 1917, in Aberystwyth. Her parents were Edith and Ernest France Roberts. Her family lived in a house, but both of her parents had Roma heritage. The family had started to integrate and become "house gypsies". Her mother, Edith (born Howard), had not lived in a house until she was ten. Jarman had a special childhood, as her playmate was her brother who was ten years older and she did not mix with other children. She learned about fishing, ferrets, dogs and how to net rabbits. Her mother was the source of oral traditions with stories. Her grandfather, Reuben Roberts, had been a harpist, while her father was employed as the regimental harpist for the South Wales Borderers. He was a talented harpist who was trusted to do his own arrangements. Eldra learned how to play by watching him.

== Career ==
Jarman married Alfred Owen Hughes Jarman in 1943. He was a Welsh speaker and she learnt that language. She had always identified as Roma, but she joined the Welsh nationalist party.

By 1949, they were living in Cardiff and Jarman used her time to research her heritage. Work done by Romani scholars John Sampson and Dora Yates. She added her own family's knowledge. In 1979 they published Y Sipsiwn Cymreig . She credits her husband and co-author for pulling all the work together.

Jarman knew many harp tunes. She worked with Bryn-mawr Dancers who had formed in 1952 and she found the ideal tune for them. None of her children learned to play the harp, but they all learned to speak Welsh. In 1989 she published stories in Welsh for children in a Roma Style titled Y gof a'r Diafol, illustrated by Suzanne Carpenter.

In 1991, Jarman and her husband published The Welsh Gypsies: Children of Abram Wood.

== Death and legacy ==
Jarman died on 24 September 2000, aged 83, at Pontypridd Cottage Hospital. In 2003, the film Eldra was screened, on her life and her memoirs.
