= Manolis Angelopoulos =

Greek singer (1939–1989)

Manolis Angelopoulos Μανώλης Αγγελόπουλος
- Born: 8 April 1939; Kavala, Greece
- Died: 2 April 1989 (aged 49) London, England
- Genre: Laiko
- Occupation: Singer
- Years active: 1957–1989

Manolis Angelopoulos (Greek: Μανώλης Αγγελόπουλος; 8 April 1939 – 2 April 1989) was a Greek singer of Romani origin.

== Biography ==
He was born on 8 April 1939, in Kavala. During his childhood Angelopoulos traveled all over Greece with his Hellenized-Romani family caravan selling a variety of goods from carpets to watermelons. The caravan trucks had a microphone and he began to sell these items through the use of his singing voice over the loudspeakers. After losing his father when he was 13, he tried to help his family by working in several clubs. His singing talent attracted many composers and producers offering him the opportunity to record his first song in 1957.

He gained popularity during the 1960s through his love songs as well as songs about Greek refugees and exotic places. He also brought a mix of Greek-Romani-Arabian influences into his songs. His song Ta Mavra Matia Sou (Greek: Τα μαύρα μάτια σου) is considered one of his most popular songs. The melody is based on a tune by the Egyptian composer Mohammed Abdel Wahab.

Manolis Angelopoulos was admitted to a London hospital on 14 January 1989. He died due to complications from heart surgery (a triple bypass) on 2 April 1989, at age 49. He is one of the most celebrated singers in Greece.

He married a native Greek woman, Anna Vasileiou, who was also a singer. They had three children; Elias, Stathis, and Maria, whose godfather was Stelios Kazantzidis.

== Famous songs ==
- "Τα μαύρα μάτια σου" (Ta mavra matia sou)
- "Μολυβιά" (Molyvia)
- "Όσο αξίζεις εσύ" (Oso axizeis esy)
- "Τη βαρέθηκε η ψυχή μου" (Ti varethike i psichi mou)
- "Σβήσε με κυρά μου" (Svise me kyra mou)
- "Τα φιλιά σου είναι φωτιά" (Ta filia sou enai fotia)
