= Huseyin Kyuchuk =

Bulgarian linguist and educator (born 1962)

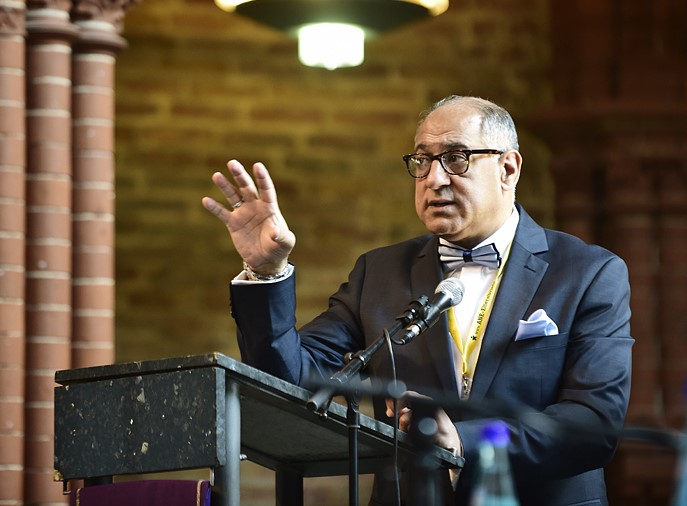
- Born: Hyusein Selimov Kyuchukov; 19 July 1962 (age 64); Provadia, Bulgaria
- Other name: Hristo Slavov Kyuchukov (1981–2024)
- Citizenship: Bulgaria, Germany
- Education: Sofia University (MA); University of Amsterdam (PhD)
- Scientific career
- Fields: Psycholinguistics, education
- Workplaces: University of Silesia in Katowice

Huseyin Selim Kyuchuk (born Hyusein Selimov Kyuchukov, 19 July 1962), known from 1981 to 2024 as Hristo Slavov Kyuchukov (Христо Славов Кючуков), is a Bulgarian linguist and educator who studies the Romani language and the education of Romani children. He is a professor at the University of Silesia in Katowice and director of its Roma Research Centre. From 2000 to 2004 he was secretary general of the International Romani Union.

== Early life and name ==
Kyuchuk was born in Provadia into a family of Muslim Roma. In 1981, during the Bulgarian authorities' campaign to assimilate the country's Muslims (see Revival Process), his name was forcibly changed from Hyusein Selimov Kyuchukov to Hristo Slavov Kyuchukov. He later described the experience in the autobiographical children's book My Name Was Hussein (2004). In 2024 he restored his Muslim name in the form Huseyin Selim Kyuchuk. Most of his work has been published under the name Hristo Kyuchukov.

== Education and academic titles ==
Kyuchuk began his career as a primary school teacher in Bulgaria. He received master's degrees from Sofia University in primary education (1991) and psycholinguistics (1992), and studied linguistics at Stockholm University in 1992–1993. He holds three doctorates: a PhD in general linguistics (psycholinguistics) from the University of Amsterdam (1995), and a PhD (1998) and a Doctor of Science (2002) in education awarded by the Bulgarian Higher Attestation Commission.

He was appointed associate professor of education in Bulgaria in 1999. In 2016 Matej Bel University in Banská Bystrica, Slovakia, conferred on him the title of professor of general linguistics (psycholinguistics).

== Career ==
Kyuchuk taught Romani language and culture at Veliko Tarnovo University, and has also taught at universities in Slovakia, Germany and the United States. Since 2017 he has worked at the University of Silesia in Katowice, where he teaches Romani language and intercultural education. In 2021 he founded the university's Roma Research Centre, which he directs.

== Research ==
His research covers the education of Romani children, bilingualism among minority children, psycholinguistics and the Romani language. He has also written on language contact between Romani, Turkish and other Balkan languages, on the Romani Holocaust and on antigypsyism in Europe. He is the author of more than 800 publications.

In the early 1990s he took part in introducing Romani language teaching in Bulgarian schools. In 2006, as a Fulbright scholar at Smith College, he worked with the psycholinguist Jill de Villiers on the first psycholinguistic tests in the Romani language.

== Public activities ==
In 1995 Kyuchuk founded the Balkan Foundation for Cross-Cultural Education and Understanding "Diversity" in Sofia, which for about two decades was one of the main publishers of books by Romani authors and for Romani children in Bulgaria. He worked with the Bulgarian Ministry of Education and the Open Society Institute on education policy for Roma.

He was secretary general of the International Romani Union from 2000 to 2004, and is vice-president of the Gypsy Lore Society.

== Awards ==
- Roma Integration Award, Amaro Foro (Berlin)
- Award for work on the Romani language, Amaro Drom (Germany)
- Career achievement award, Amico Rom and the Italian Ministry of Culture

== Selected works ==
- Amari Romani Lumja, vols. 1–4. Sofia, 1997–2001.
- My Name Was Hussein. Honesdale: Boyds Mills Press, 2004.
- (with Ian Hancock) A History of the Romani People. Honesdale: Boyds Mills Press, 2005.
- Textbook of Romani Songs. Munich: Lincom Europa, 2010.
