= Dehran Asanov =

German Salafi preacher

Personal life
- Born: 1991 (age 34–35) North Rhine-Westphalia, Germany
- Spouse: Gju Asanova
- Other name: Abdelhamid
- Occupation: Preacher

Religious life
- Religion: Islam
- Denomination: Sunni
- Jurisprudence: Hanbali
- Creed: Athari
- Movement: Salafism

Muslim leader
- Teacher: None

Dehran Asanov (Macedonian: Дејран Асанов), also known as Abdelhamid, is a German Salafi preacher based in Düsseldorf, Germany, famous for his TikTok videos and his conviction of embezzling charitable donations for Palestine in 2025.

== Early life ==
Not much is known about Asanov's early life. He was born in 1991 in North Rhine-Westphalia into a Romani family. According to Welt, he visited and preached in majority-Romani mosques and was a part of Ansaar International, a German Muslim organisation that supported people in Syria and Palestine through charity, but was accused of "supporting terrorist organisations with donations".

== Religious life ==
Dehran Asanov used to preach in various mosques up until his arrest in 2024, such as the mosque in Herford or the Masjid as-Salam in Düsseldorf, mainly in German but earlier also Romani. He is especially known for his activities on social media, with 187,000 followers on Instagram and almost 600,000 on TikTok. With his growing amount of views and attention, he used it to collect donations for "charitable purposes" 19 times. On 19 January 2024, he was supposed to be the moderator of a Europe-wide Islamic tour by Mohamed Hoblos, another Islamic Salafi preacher, from Australia. However, Hoblos' entry into Germany was denied. Additionally, Asanov has been described as a "Salafi extremist" and "hate preacher".

== Arrest ==
Asanov was arrested by German authorities in 2024 on allegations of "misusing donations". With his wide reach, he had been advocating for charity donations since 2021, however, in late 2024, his house was stormed and he was arrested, after which the police found multiple "sacks of money and expensive luxury cars" in and around his property. The authorities accused him of having used the donations for his personal life instead of donating them as promised. In July of 2025, Asanov was sentenced to 3 years of jail due to charity fraud.
