= United Nations Special Rapporteur on Minority Issues =

United Nations Special Rapporteur

Special Rapporteur on minorities

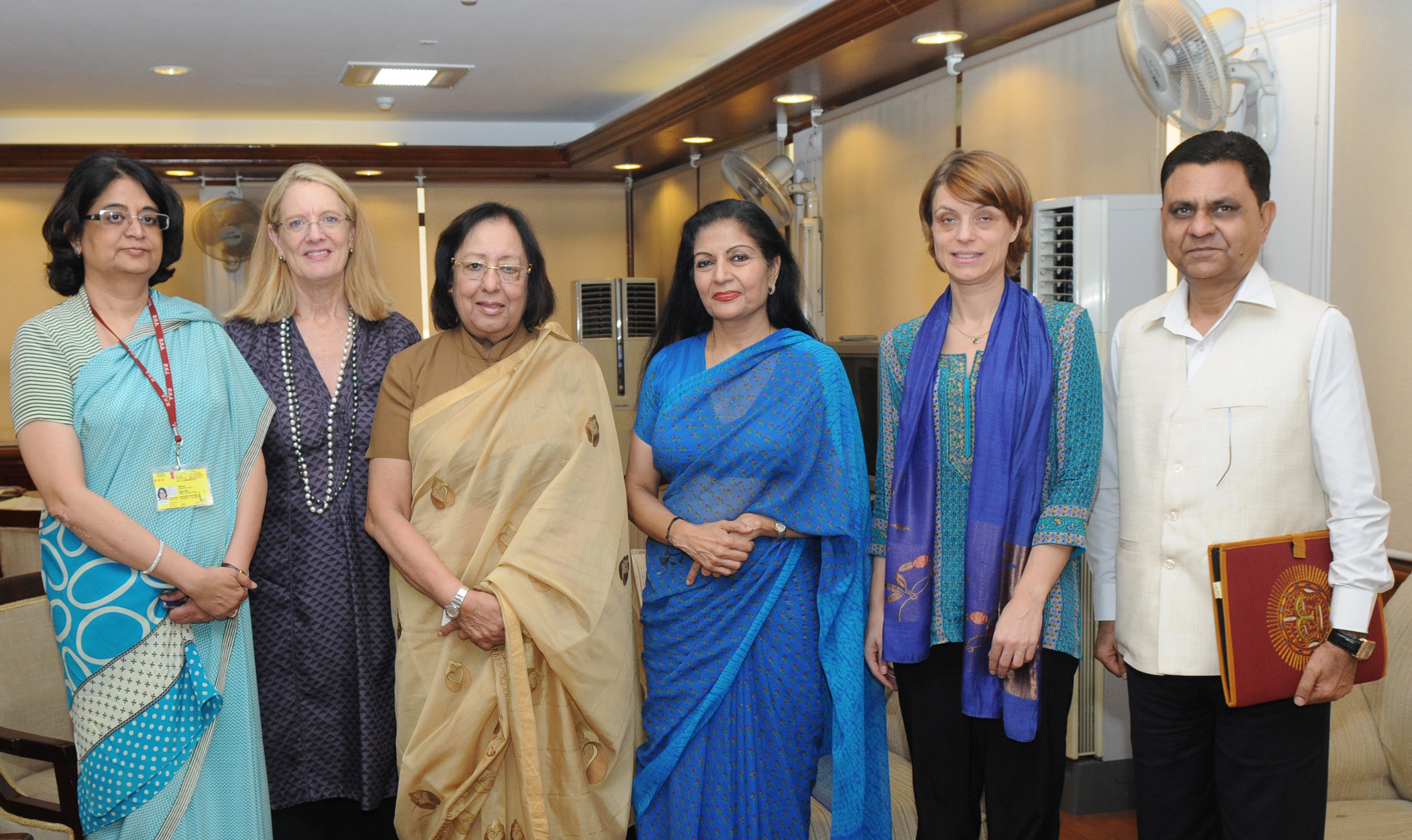
- Special Rapporteur
- Abbreviation: SRMinorities
- Type: minority issues
- Headquarters: Palais des Nations, Geneva
- Head: Prof. Nicolas Levrat (since 1.11.2023)
- Parent organization: UN Human Rights Council
- Subsidiaries: Special Rapporteur
- Rapporteur spécial sur les questions relatives aux minorités

The post of Special Rapporteur on Minorities has been created as minorities in all regions of the world are exposed to serious threats, discrimination and racism and are often excluded from participation in economic, political and social life. It shall provide for the implementation of the Declaration on the Rights of Members of National or Ethnic, Religious and Linguistic Minorities, taking into account existing international norms and national minority laws.

== The UN mandate ==
The UN Human Rights Commission created this body on April 21, 2005 by means of a resolution that also defined the mandate. This UN mandate is limited to three years and is regularly renewed. After the UN Human Rights Council was replaced in 2006 by the UN Human Rights Council, it is now in charge and exercising oversight. The last extension of the mandate took place on April 6, 2017.

The expert is not a United Nations staff member but is mandated by the UN, and the UN Human Rights Council has issued a code of conduct. The independent status of the mandate holder is crucial for the impartial performance of his duties. The term of office of a mandate is limited to a maximum of six years.

He prepares thematic studies and develops guidelines for the improvement of human rights. The Special Representative makes country visits at the invitation of states and can make recommendations in an advisory capacity. He reviews communications and makes proposals to the states on how to remedy any abuses. He also does follow-up procedures in which he reviews the implementation of the recommendations. He compiles annual reports for the attention of the UN Human Rights Council.

== Annual Reports ==
The Special Rapporteur's annual reports normally include a focus on relevance for the rights of minorities, as well as a description of the activities carried out during the year in the framework of the mandate.

=== HRC 43rd session - 2020 ===
In March 2020 Fernand de Varennes RP, Doyen, United Nations Special Rapporteur on minority report provides a clear working definition of the concept of a minority in order to guide the activities of the United Nations. In the thematic section of Fernand de Varennes's report, he sets out the often misunderstood language dimension of education for minorities, which emanates from the proper understanding and implementation of international human rights obligations. He describes the parameters of the principles of equality without discrimination, as of primary importance for the achievement of Sustainable Development Goal 4 on quality education for all, including linguistic minorities such as users of sign languages.

The Special Rapporteur Recommendations:

- Recommendations relating to the working definition of the concept of a minority.
- Recommendations relating to education, language and the human rights of minorities.
- Recommendations relating to the Forum on Minority Issues and the regional forums.
- A recommendation that was often raised during the regional forums and other activities, that the human rights of minorities be highlighted more frequently and that a more detailed approach be considered in their recognition and protection within the United Nations system.

=== HRC 34th session - 2017 ===
On 24 March 2017, The Secretariat has transmitted to the Human Rights Council the report of the Special Rapporteur on minority on the Iraq issue.

Minority, ethnic and religious communities in Iraq, which have been an integral part of the population of the country for millenniums, are facing an unprecedented crisis that threatens their continued existence in the country. Iraq is at a crossroads, and the actions of the Government now will determine the extent to which the country maintains its rich ethnic neglect of minority rights will seek security and seeing few prospects for protection of their human rights in Iraq, many have left the country, resulting in a dramatic decrease in minority populations. Without urgent action, many thousands more may follow.

The genocidal terror campaign perpetrated by (ISIL) known as Daesh, has had a particular impact on regions with large minority populations, resulting in communities, many thousands being killed or held captive, including women and children held in sexual slavery. Many remain captive and many fleeing their homes or death. Allegations of genocide against the Yazidi must be fully investigated. The Government and the international community must also act decisively under international law to protect civilians and to prosecute those suspected of such crimes.

The communities, political and social life. Trust in national authorities and hope for the future must be rebuilt on a foundation of consultation, participation and legal, policy and institutional frameworks for minority rights, which are currently absent.
