= Thekla Popov =

19th-century Hungarian poisoner

Thelka Popov (c. 1812 - 1883) was a nineteenth century Hungarian poisoner. She aided and abetted in the poisoning of more than 100 men. She mostly helped women kill their husbands or boyfriends. She was from the Roma minority and was about 70 years old at the time of her arrest. According to some reports she was only found out when she quarrelled with her daughter. Her crimes were reported as far afield as New York.

== See also ==
- Angel Makers of Nagyrév
- Aqua Tofana
