= Guszti Bódi =

Hungarian musician (born 1958)

Guszti Bódi (born 12 December 1958) is a Hungarian Roma musician, composer, and singer.

== Biography ==
Bódi started performing, singing and playing piano early in his childhood. He married his love Margó at the age of 18. He formed his group, Nagyecsedi Fekete szemek, in 1978. In English this translates as Black Eyes from Nagyecsed. At that time it was a 22-member dance ensemble.

In 1987 Guszti and Margó decided to move their family to Budapest to establish and create the so-called "pop-gypsy" music, which was a lighter more entertaining style than their earlier Roma music. With the release of their album Szeretlek, Szeretlek ('I love you, I love you') in 2000 they finally became famous and popular all over Hungary. Over the years the group acquired 14 gold, and 8 platinum awards. Guszti often performs with other Hungarian entertainers like Lagzi Lajcsi, Kozsó, and others.

His group Fekete szemek ('Black Eyes') is entirely family-structured, i.e., his two sons Csaba and Guszti Jr. grew up with the group and became part of it.

== Members of Bódi és a Fekete szemek ==
- Bódi Guszti, vocal, composer
- Bódi Margó, vocal, lyrics
- Bódi Csaba, vocal, milk-bucket drum
- Bódi Guszti Jr., vocal, guitar

== List of albums ==
- 1992 Aranyalbum (válogatás)
- 1995 Háj Romalé
- 2000 Szeretlek, Szeretlek – double platinum
- 2000 Kalapom, Kalapom
- 2001 Bilincs a szivemen
- 2002 Egy bűnöm van
- 2002 Bulizzunk ma együtt
- 2003 Aranyos hintó
- 2004 Nem én lettem hűtlen
- 2004 Roma Sztárparádé No. 1, Bódi Guszti és barátai
- 2005 Roma Sztárparádé No. 2
- 2005 Rabolj el mégegyszer
- 2006 Roma Sztárparádé No. 3
- 2007 Forr a vérem
- 2007 Bódi Guszti CD válogatás
- 2008 Roma Rómeo
- 2009 Őszi eső
- 2011 Fájdalom nélkül
- 2012 Hosszú rögös út
