= Leonor Teles (filmmaker) =

Portuguese filmmaker (born 1992)

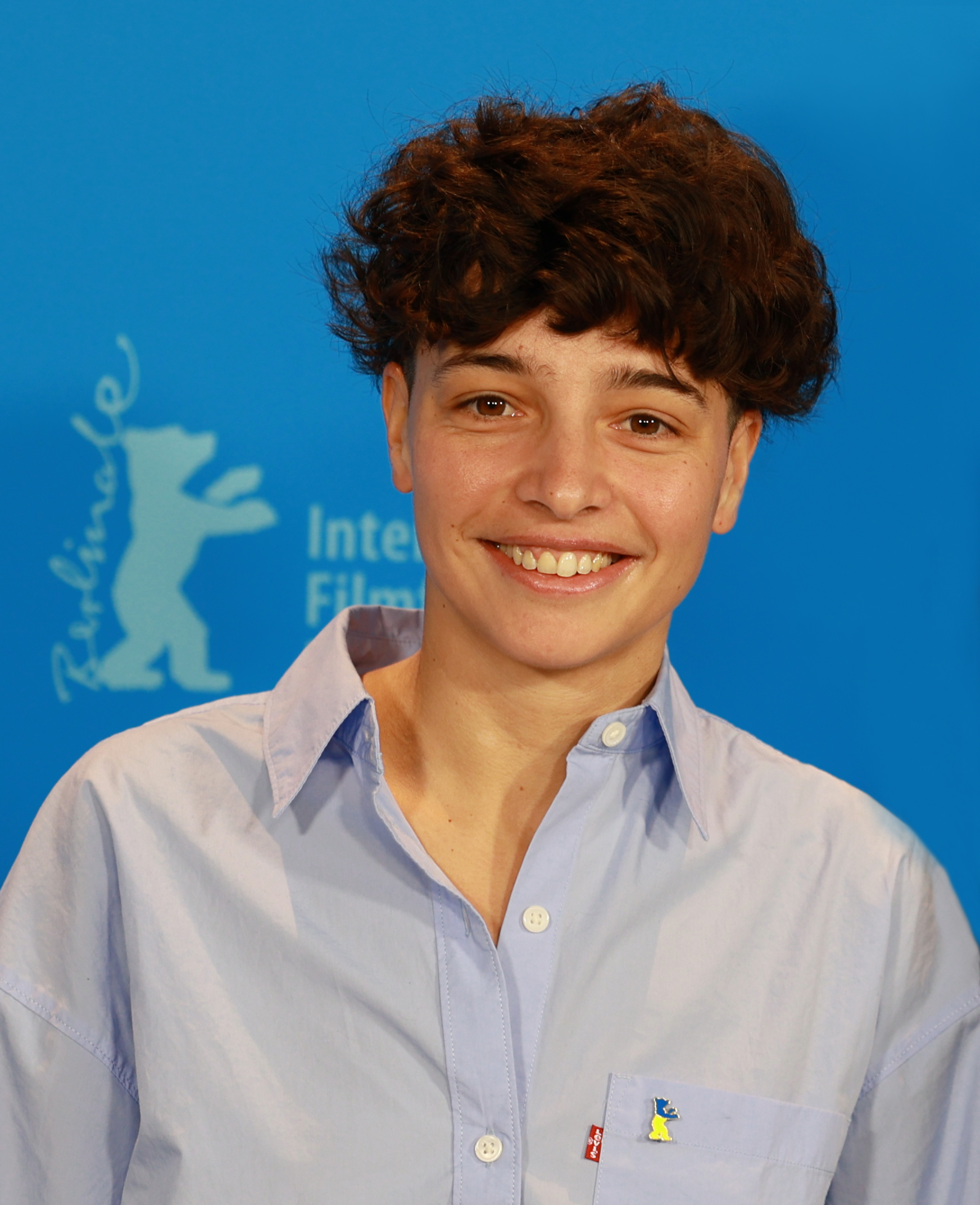
- Leonor Teles at Berlinale 2023, by Elena Ternovaja
- Born: 1992 (age 33–34); Vila Franca de Xira
- Occupations: Cinematographer; Film director
- Awards: Short Film Golden Bear (2016)

Leonor Diogo Vitorino Teles (born in 1992) is a Portuguese filmmaker. In 2016, she became the youngest filmmaker to receive a Golden Bear for short films at the Berlin International Film Festival.

== Education and career ==
Her debut commercial film was Rhoma Acans, a documentary made as a school project, where she explored her Romani roots. After graduating, her first film was Balada de um Batráquio (Batrachian's Ballad).

== Filmography ==
Teles was either director or cinematographer in the following films:

- As Coisas dos Outros (2012), documentary short;
- Rhoma Acans (2012), documentary short;
- Estranhamento / Estrangement (2013), short;
- O Sítio Onde as Raposas Dizem Boa Noite (2014), short;
- Otorrinolaringologista (2015), short;
- Balada de um Batráquio / Batrachian’s Ballad (2015), short documentary;
- Verão Danado (2017);
- Terra Franca / Ashore (2018), documentary;
- Filomena (2019), short;
- Cães que Ladram aos Pássaros / Dogs Barking at Birds (2019), short;
- Cenas de Família (2017-2019), in 18 episodes of the TV series.
- Azul (2022), short;
- Bad Living (2022);
- Arriba Beach (2024), short;

== Awards ==
Teles has received the following prizes for her work in cinema.

- Rhoma Acans (2012):
  - Take One! Award (for school films) at the Curtas Vila do Conde Festival (2013);
  - Árvore da Vida Award - Special Mention at the IndieLisboa International Independent Film Festival (2013);
  - Short Film of the Month at the Shortcutz Lisboa (March 2014);
- O Sítio Onde as Raposas Dizem Boa Noite (2014):
  - Best Cinematography Award in the National Competition of the CinEuphoria Awards (2015);
  - Top Short Films of the Year Award in the National Competition of the CinEuphoria Awards (2015);
- Balada de um Batráquio / Batrachian’s Ballad (2016):
  - Short Film Golden Bear at the Berlin International Film Festival (2016);
  - Capivara Trophy for Best International Short Film at the Belo Horizonte International Film Festival (2016);
  - Golden Firebird Award in the Short Film Competition of the Hong Kong International Film Festival (2016);
  - Revelation Award at the Caminhos do Cinema Português Film Festival (2016);
  - Sophia Award for Best Short Film Documentary at the Portuguese Film Academy Sophia Awards (2017);
  - Amnesty International Award - Special Mention at the IndieLisboa International Independent Film Festival (2016);
- Terra Franca / Ashore (2018):
  - Don Quijote Award and the Best Feature Film Award at the Caminhos do Cinema Português Film Festival (2018);
  - Cervantes Award for Most Innovative Short in the MedFilm Festival (2016);
  - Prix International de la Scam at the Festival Cinéma du Réel em Paris (2018);
  - Prix de la Ville d'Amiens at the Festival d'Amiens (2018);
  - Mejor Opera Prima International at the Mar del Plata International Film Festival (2018).

She also won the Municipal Golden Medal of Cultural Value, awarded by the Vila Franca de Xira City Council, in 2016, after winning the Short Film Golden Bear.
