= Saša Barbul =

Serbian actor and film director

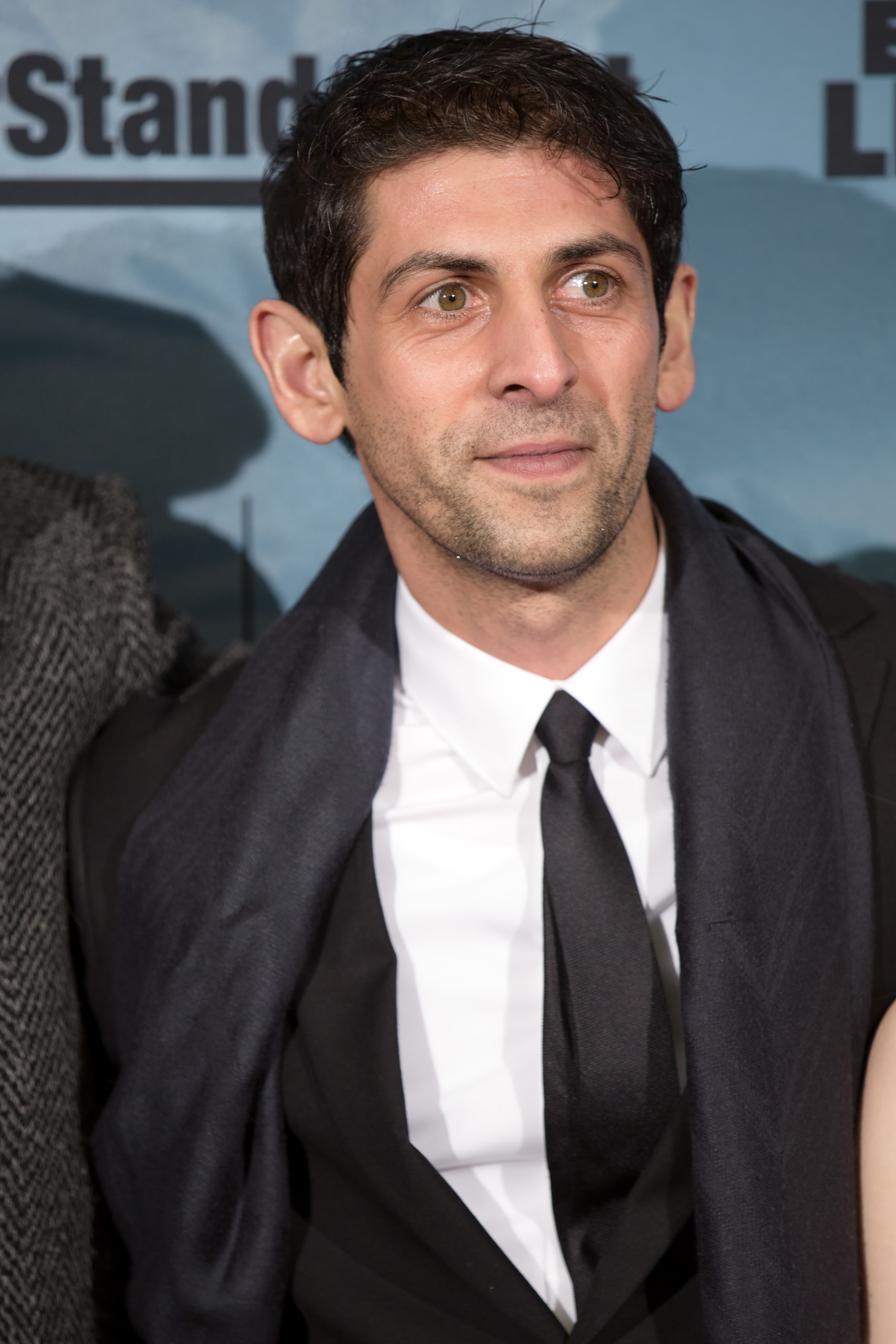
- Barbul at the premiere of Das ewige Leben in 2015
- Born: 1981 (age 44–45); Žabalj, Serbia, Yugoslavia
- Occupations: Actor, filmmaker, director
- Years active: 2009–present

Saša Barbul (born 1981) is a Serbian Roma actor and film director.

== Career ==
In 2001, his first play called Roma and then was performed in Žabalj which he also directed. Since 2001, Barbul works on projects of the Romani community in Serbia and Austria. In 2005, he went to Vienna, where he acted in various stage plays: Futur Roma with Nikola Radin and Liebesforschung by Tina Leisch (2006); in 2013, he participated in the performance Österreicher, integriert euch! (God's Entertainment), the Neue Bohemian Gastarbeiteroper (Alexander Nikolić), and in the plays Botschaft von Astoria (Sandra Selimović) and Die Irre von Chaillot (Manfred Michalke).

From 2007 to 2011, Barbul lived in Serbia again because of problems with his residence permit in Austria. There, he made his first documentary film Gazela - Temporary shelter from 100-500 years in 2009 together with Vladan Jeremic. This was followed by the films Bitte nicht vergessen, Amaro Drom - Unser Weg and Roma Boulevard. In 2012, he married Matilda Leko now living in Vienna. He is currently working with Philomena Grassl on a family portrait in a Serbian Romani settlement. In 2014 he was awarded the kültüř gemma!-grant.

Barbul made his first cinematic experience in the feature film Bad Fucking by Harald Sicheritz. His first more prominent role was in the Austro-German crime film Das ewige Leben by director Wolfgang Murnberger. After that he had a guest appearance in the Austrian television series 4 Frauen und 1 Todesfall (Wolfgang Murnberger).

From February to May 2015, he organised and curated the first Roma Film Festival at Vienna's Stadtkino (Opre Roma Film Festival).
