= Olena Kondratiuk =

Ukrainian politician

- Олена Кондратюк
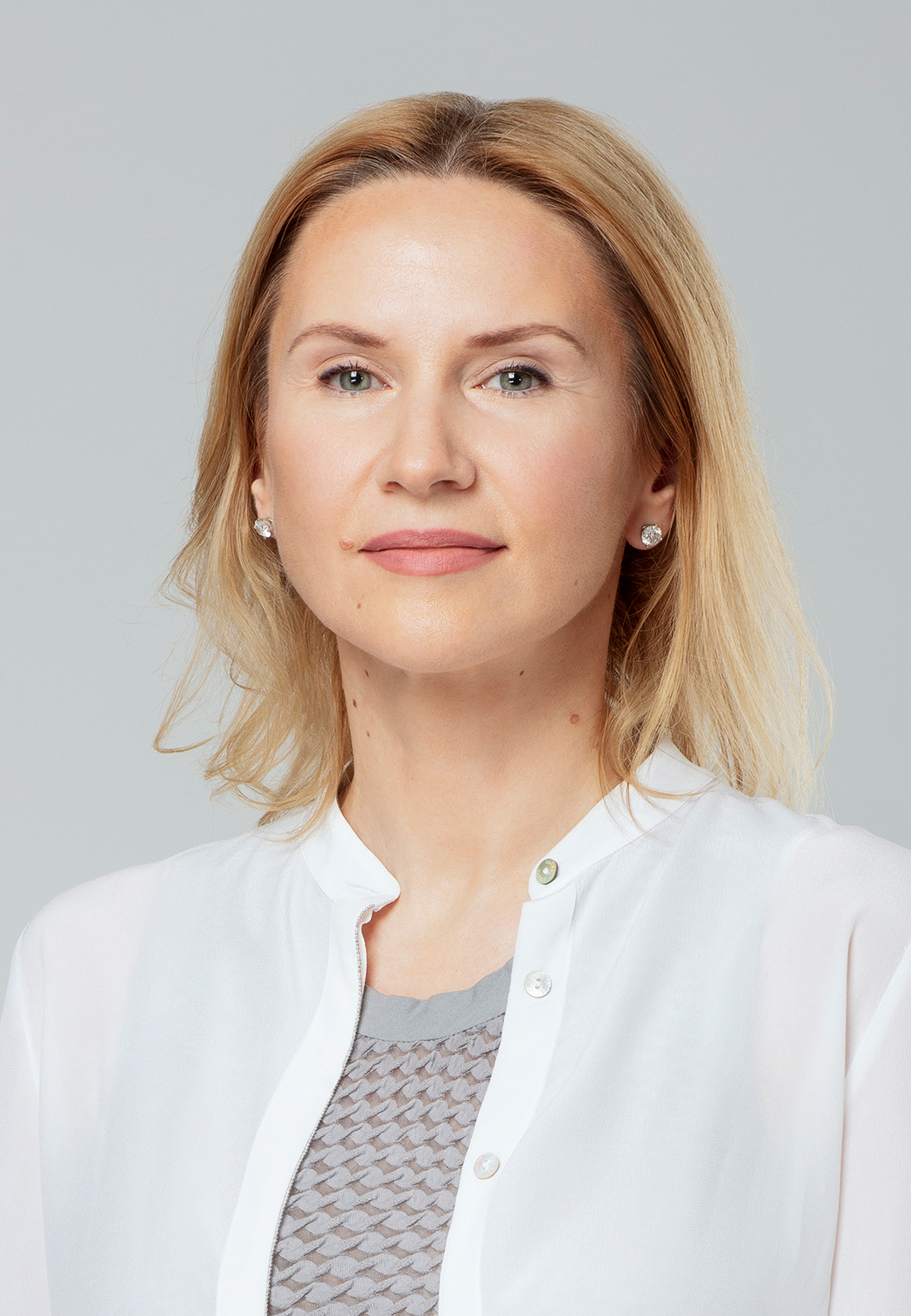
- Official portrait, 2019

Deputy Chair of the Verkhovna Rada
- Incumbent
- Assumed office 29 August 2019
- Preceded by: Oksana Syroyid

People's Deputy of Ukraine

9th convocation
- Incumbent
- Assumed office 29 August 2019
- Constituency: Batkivshchyna, No.5

8th convocation
- In office 27 November 2014 – 24 July 2019
- Constituency: Batkivshchyna, No.18

7th convocation
- In office 12 December 2012 – 27 November 2014
- Constituency: Batkivshchyna, No.60

6th convocation
- In office 23 November 2007 – 12 December 2012
- Constituency: Yulia Tymoshenko Bloc, No.134

Personal details
- Born: 17 November 1970 (age 55) Lviv, Ukrainian SSR, Soviet Union
- Party: Batkivshchyna
- Other political affiliations: Reforms and Order Party
- Spouse: Oleksandr Bohutskyi
- Children: daughter
- Education: Lviv University (1993)
- Website: Verkhovna Rada website

Olena Kostiantynivna Kondratiuk (Ukrainian: Олена Костянтинівна Кондратюк; born 17 November 1970) is a Ukrainian politician, Deputy Chair of the Verkhovna Rada of Ukraine of the 9th convocation, Member of the Parliament of the 6th, 7th, 8th and 9th convocations from the “Batkivshchyna” party. Secretary of the VRU Committee on Freedom of Speech and Information Policy of the 8th Convocation, Deputy Member of the Delegation to the OSCE Parliamentary Assembly, Co-Chairman of the Inter-Factional Deputy Caucus "Equal Opportunities". Former director of the “Radnyk” PR agency.

== Early life and education ==
Olena Kondratiuk was born in Lviv. In 1993, she graduated from Ivan Franko Lviv National University as a historian. PhD of historical sciences, researched public movements in Ukraine.

== Career ==
Co-author of the Law of Ukraine "On Ensuring the Functioning of the Ukrainian Language as a State Language".

Active lobbyist of draft law 3822-1 on quotas for Ukrainian songs.

In 2012, she was one of the founders of the Inter-factional Deputy Association "Equal Opportunities".

Candidate for Member of the Parliament from "Batkivshchyna" in the 2019 parliamentary elections, No. 5 on the list.

In August 2019, she was elected Deputy Speaker of the Verkhovna Rada of Ukraine of the 9th convocation.

From November 13, 2020, to November 29, 2020, served as the Speaker of the Verkhovna Rada of Ukraine.

During the large-scale invasion, she repeatedly performed representative functions abroad, in particular, she headed the Ukrainian delegation at the 8th Summit of the Heads of Parliaments of the G20.

== Awards ==
Award of the Ministry of Internal Affairs of Ukraine "Firearm" (May 29, 2014; "Fort 9", No. 100008, caliber 9 mm).

Order of Princess Olga III degree (August 23, 2021) — for a significant personal contribution to state building, strengthening defense capabilities, socio-economic, scientific-technical, cultural-educational development of the Ukrainian state, significant labor achievements, many years of conscientious work and on the occasion of the 30 anniversary of the independence of Ukraine

== Family ==
Father — Kostyantyn Kondratiuk, professor, doctor of historical sciences at Ivan Franko Lviv National University.

The husband is Oleksandr Bohutskyi, director of the ICTV channel, member of the board of the EastOne investment consulting company. They are raising their daughter, Yustyna.
