= Romani people in Spain =

Ethnic group living on the Iberian Peninsula

Calé, Gitanos
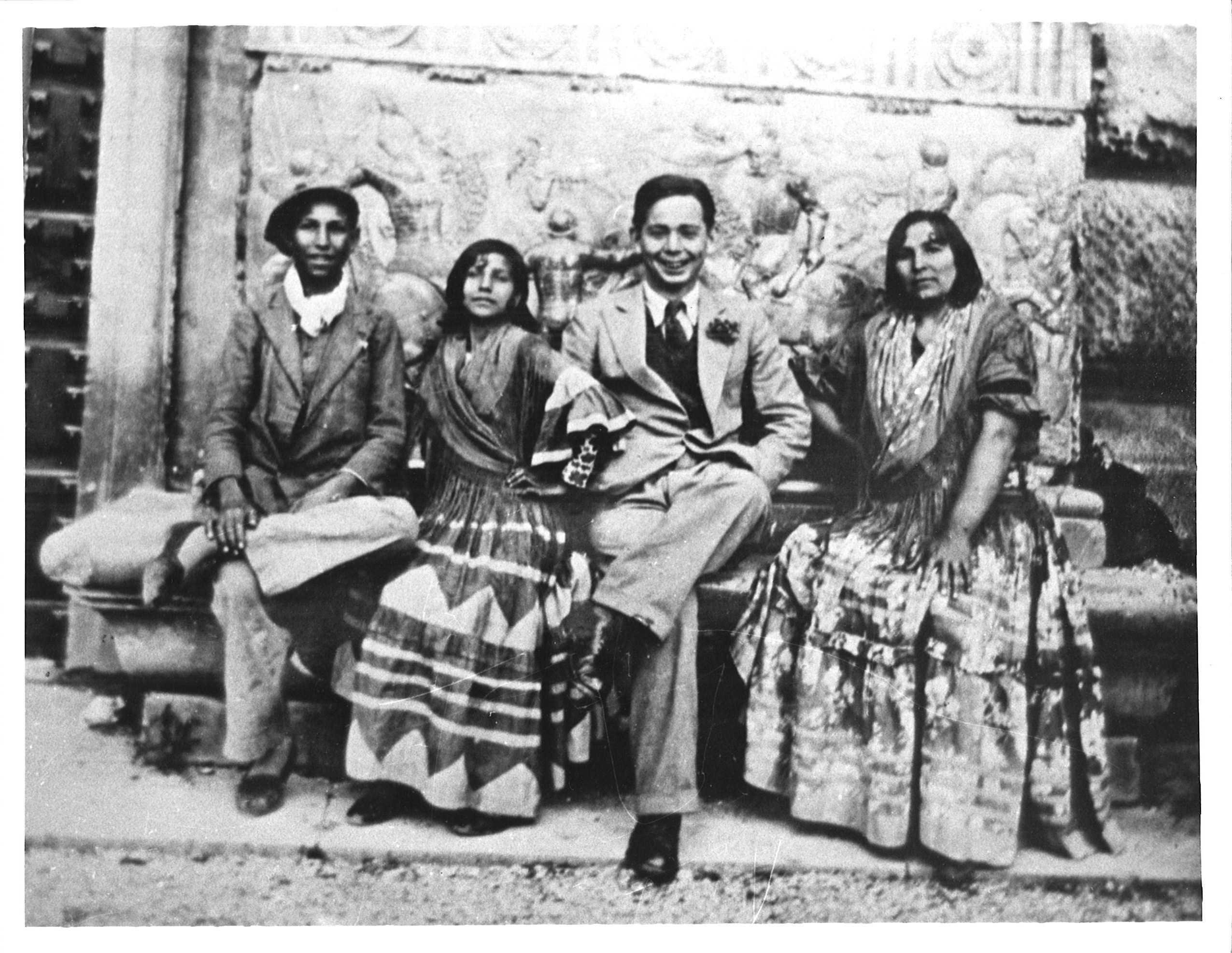
- Romani people in Spain, 1930s

Total population
- Estimated 650,000-1,500,000

Regions with significant populations
- Andalusia, Valencia, Madrid and Catalonia

Languages
- Caló; Spanish; Catalan; Basque (Erromintxela); Galician; Asturian; Aragonese; Manouche; Occitan (Aranese)

Religion
- Roman Catholicism, Evangelicalism

Related ethnic groups
- Other Romani people

The Romani in Spain, known as Calé or gitanos (Spanish pronunciation: [xiˈtanos], an exonym which the community has adopted, literally translated into English as Gypsies) belong to the Iberian Romani subgroup known as Calé, with smaller populations in Portugal (known as ciganos) and in Southern France (known as gitans). Their sense of identity and cohesion stems from their shared value system, expressed among gitanos as las leyes gitanas ('Gypsy laws').

Traditionally, they maintain their social circles strictly within their patrigroups, as interaction between patrigroups increases the risk of feuding, which may result in fatalities. The emergence of Pentecostalism has impacted this practice, as the lifestyle of Pentecostal gitanos involves frequent contact with Calé people from outside their own patrigroups during church services and meetings. Data on ethnicity are not collected in Spain, although the public pollster CIS estimated in 2007 that the number of Calé present in Spain is probably around one million.

== Name ==
The term gitano evolved from the word egiptano ("Egyptian"), which was the Old Spanish demonym for someone from Egipto (Egypt), however, in Middle and Modern Spanish the irregular adjective egipcio supplanted egiptano to mean Egyptian, probably to differentiate Egyptians from Gypsies. Meanwhile, the term egiptano evolved through elision into egitano and finally into gitano, losing the meaning of Egyptian and carrying with it a specific meaning of Romanis in Spain. The two peoples are now unambiguously differentiated in modern Spanish, "egipcios" for Egyptians and "gitanos" for Roma in Spain, with "egiptano" being obsolete for either.

Though etymologically the term gitano originally meant "Egyptian", the use itself of the Old Spanish word meaning "Egyptian" (egiptano) to refer to Romanis in Spain developed in the same way that the English word "Gypsy" also evolved from the English adjective "Egyptian" to refer to Romanis in Britain. Some Romanis, a people originating in the northern regions of the Indian subcontinent, upon their first arrivals to Europe, either claimed to be Egyptians for a more favourable treatment by local Europeans, or were mistaken as Egyptians by local Europeans.

== Identity ==
The group's identity is particularly complex in Spain for a variety of reasons that are examined below. Nevertheless, it can be safely said that both from the perspective of gitano and non-gitano (payo) Spaniards, individuals generally considered to belong to this ethnicity are those of full or near-full gitano descent and who also self-identify as such. A confusing element is the thorough hybridization of Andalusian and Roma culture (and some would say identity) at a popular level. This has occurred to the point where Spaniards from other regions of Spain commonly mistake elements of one for the other. The clearest example of this is flamenco music and Sevillanas, art forms that are Andalusian rather than gitano in origin but, having been strongly marked by gitanos in interpretative style, are now commonly associated with this ethnicity by many Spaniards. The fact that the largest population of gitanos is concentrated in Southern Spain has even led to a confusion between gitano accents and those more typical of Southern Spain even though many Kale populations in the northern half of Spain (such as Galicia) do not speak Andalusian Spanish.

=== Origin ===
The Romani people originate from northwestern Hindustan, presumably from the northwestern Indian state of Rajasthan and the Punjab region shared between India and Pakistan.

The linguistic evidence has indisputably shown that the roots of the Romani language lie in the Indian subcontinent: the language has grammatical characteristics of Indic languages and shares with them a big part of the basic lexicon, for example, body parts, daily routines and numerals.

More exactly, Romani shares the basic lexicon with Hindi and Punjabi. It shares many phonetic features with Marwari, while its grammar is closest to Bengali. Linguistic evaluation carried out in the nineteenth century by Pott (1845) and Miklosich (1882–1888) showed that the Romani language is to be classed as a New Indo-Aryan language (NIA), not a Middle Indo-Aryan (MIA), establishing that the ancestors of the Romani could not have left the Indian subcontinent significantly earlier than AD 1000, finally reaching Europe several hundred years later.

Genetic findings in 2012 suggest the Romani originated in the northwestern region of the Indian subcontinent and migrated as a group. According to a genetic study in 2012, the ancestors of present scheduled tribes and scheduled caste populations of northern India, traditionally referred to collectively as the "Ḍoma", are the likely ancestral populations of modern "Roma" in Europe.

=== Migration to Spain ===
How and when the Romani arrived in the Iberian Peninsula from Northern India is a question whose consensus is far from being reached. A popular theory, although without any documentation, claims they came from North Africa, from where they would have crossed the Strait of Gibraltar to meet again in France with the northern migratory route. Thus, gitanos would be a deformation of Latin Tingitani, that is, from Tingis, today Tangier. Another, more consistent theory, and well documented, is that they entered the Iberian Peninsula from France. Although there is controversy over the date of the first arrival, since there is evidence of a safe conduct granted in Perpignan in 1415 by the infante Alfonso of Aragon to one Tomás, son of Bartolomé de Sanno, who is said to be "Indie Majoris". Or instead, it could be the so-called Juan de Egipto Menor, who entered through France, when in 1425 Alfonso V granted him a letter of insurance; he is mostly accepted as the first Romani person to reach the peninsula.

... As our beloved and devoted Don Juan de Egipto Menor ... understands that he must pass through some parts of our kingdoms and lands, and we want him to be well treated and welcomed ... under pain of our wrath and indignation ... the mentioned Don Juan de Egipto and those who will go with him and accompany him, with all their horses, clothes, goods, gold, silver, saddlebags and whatever else they bring with them, let them go, stay and go through any city, town, place and other parts of our lordship safe and secure ... and giving those safe passage and being driven when the aforementioned don Juan requires it through this present safe conduct ... Delivered in Zaragoza with our seal on January 12 of the year of birth of our Lord 1425. King Alfonso.

In 1435 they were seen in Santiago de Compostela. Gitanos were recorded in Barcelona and Zaragoza by 1447, and in 1462 they were received with honors in Jaén. Years later, to the gitanos, the grecianos, pilgrims who penetrated the Mediterranean shore in the 1480s, were added to them, probably because of the fall of Constantinople. Both of them continued to wander throughout the peninsula, being well received at least until 1493, year in which a group of gitanos arrived at Madrid, where the Council agreed to "... give alms to the gitanos because at the request of the City passed ahead, ten reales, to avoid the damages that could be done by three hundred people who came ... ".

In those years safe conducts were granted to supposedly noble Calé pilgrims. The follow-up of these safe-conducts throughout Spain has provided some data to historians according to Teresa San Román:

- The number of Romani that entered or inhabited the Peninsula in the 15th-century is estimated at 3,000 individuals.
- The Roma traveled in variable groups, of 80-150 people, led by a man.
- Each autonomous group maintained relations at a distance with one of the others, there being perhaps relations of kinship among them (something common today among Spanish Romani).
- The separation between each group was variable and sometimes some followed the others at close range and by the same routes.
- The most common survival strategy was to present as Christian pilgrims to seek the protection of a noble.
- The way of life was nomadic and dedicated to divination and performance (spectacle).

=== First assimilation attempts ===
Established power in the Iberian peninsula perceived the presence of the Roma population as a challenge due to not being a sedentary population with their dominant religion. The first attempt to assimilate Roma population in Spain was carried out by the Catholic Monarchs of Spain in 1499. The Pragmatic Sanction of Medina Del Campo forced Roma people to abandon their nomadic lifestyle, acquire a trade or serve a local lord, and abandon their way of dressing and customs, under penalty of expulsion or slavery. The legislation gave them a period of two months for their integration. After this anti-Roma pragmatic sanction, more than 280 regulations and laws were promulgated against the gitano people, from 1499 to 1978, when the last one was rescinded.

In 1492, the Roma auxiliaries helped the army of the Kingdom of Castile and León in the Reconquista in Granada ending the reign of Muslims in Spain. Spanish gitanos could only travel to America with the express permission of the king. Philip II decreed in 1570 a ban on the entry of Gypsies into America and ordered the return of those already sent. There is a known case of a Gypsy blacksmith (Jorge Leal) who obtained authorization to travel to Cuba in 1602. Meanwhile, in Spain a new law ordered Roma people to sedentarize under penalty of six years in the galleys (1539). Different factors meant that Spanish Roma, like those throughout Europe, resisted assimilation and kept their own cultural traits more or less intact.

In 1749, a major effort to get rid of the Calé population in Spain was carried out through a raid organized by the government. During this time, the Roma were subjected to mass internment in what is commonly referred to as "The Great Gypsy Round-Up" (La Gran Redada) of 1749, which led to widespread forced expulsions. Their language (Rromani-chib), traditional clothing, and occupations, such as fortune-telling, were officially prohibited. In 1783, Carlos III, King of Spain and the Spanish Indies (1759-1788), granted citizenship to the Roma but sought their complete assimilation by forbidding the preservation of their unique culture and traditions. Additionally, the use of the term "Gitano" was banned in any context. This legislation remained in effect throughout the 19th century. Until 1783, over 250 anti-Roma decrees were enacted in Spain with the intent of dissolving the Roma as a distinct ethnic group.

For about 300 years, Romanies were subject to a number of laws and policies designed to eliminate them from Spain as an identifiable group. Romani settlements were broken up and the residents dispersed; sometimes, Romanies were required to marry non-Roma; they were prohibited from using their language and rituals, and were excluded from public office and from guild membership.

During the Spanish Civil War, gitanos were not persecuted for their ethnicity by either side. Under the regime of Francisco Franco, gitanos were often harassed or simply ignored, although their children were educated, sometimes forcibly, much as all Spaniards are nowadays.

In the post-Franco era, Spanish government policy has been much more sympathetic, especially in the area of social welfare and social services. In 1977, the last anti-Romani laws were repealed, an action promoted by Juan de Dios Ramírez Heredia, the first Romani deputy.

Beginning in 1983, the government operated a special program of Compensatory Education to promote educational rights for the disadvantaged, including those in Romani communities. During the heroin epidemic that afflicted Spain in the 1980s and 1990s, gitano shanty towns became central to the drug trade, a problem that afflicts Spain to this day. Nevertheless, Spain is still considered a model for integration of gitano communities when compared to other countries with Romani populations in Eastern Europe.

== Language ==
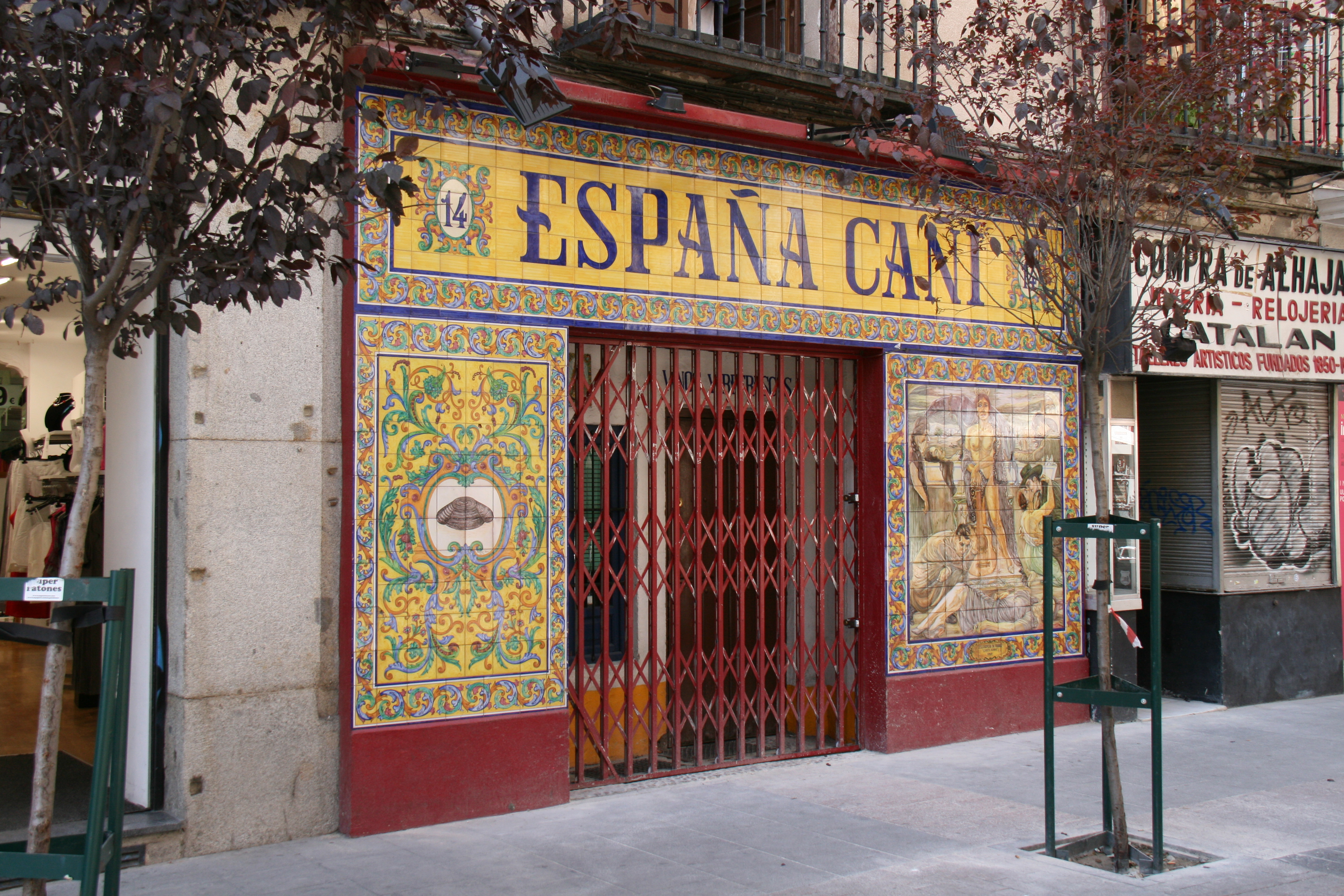
España cañí, Spanish for "Gipsy Spain", including the Caló word cañí is the name of this bar in Madrid featuring a reproduction of Cante jondo, a 1929 painting by Julio Romero de Torres displaying stereotypes associated with Flamenco.

Historically, gitanos spoke Caló, also known as Romanés, fluently, often alongside the language spoken in the region they inhabited. Caló is a type of para-Romani, combining the phonology and grammar of the Catalan or Castilian, with a lexicon derived from Romani. The para-Romani resulting from the combination of Basque and Romani is called Erromintxela. Very few gitanos maintain a comprehensive and functional knowledge of Caló. A study on the actual usage patterns of Caló among a group of mainly Andalusian gitanos concluded that the language currently consists of between 350 and 400 unique terms, the knowledge of which varies considerably among gitanos. This would exclude a similar number of Caló words that have entered mainstream Spanish slang. According to the authors of the study, the majority of gitanos acknowledge that the language is in a terminal state, with many asserting that the language is totally lost. Several Caló words are part of Spanish slang including Madrid Cheli.

== Religion ==
In Spain, gitanos were traditionally Roman Catholic. They follow traditions such as the veneration of the Virgin of El Rocío. In 1997, Pope John Paul II beatified the Catholic gitano martyr Ceferino Giménez Malla, in a ceremony reportedly attended by some 3,000 Roma. Sara-la-Kali is the patron saint of Romani people in Folk Catholicism, although she is not recognized as a saint by the Catholic Church.

They rarely go to folk healers, and they participate fully in Spain's state-supported medical system. Gitanos have a special involvement with recently- dead kin and visit their graves frequently. They spend more money than non-gitanos of equivalent economic classes in adorning grave sites.

The Spanish New-Protestant/New-Born Federation (mostly composed of members of the Assemblies of God and Pentecostal) claims that 150,000 gitanos have joined their faith in Spain. The Romani Evangelical Assembly is the only religious institution entirely led and composed by Roma. The gitano Evangelical church (Iglesia de Filadelfia) asserts the gitano people originate from a group of Jews who got lost during Moses' lifetime and eventually became the gitanos.

== Culture ==
=== Music and dance ===
The art of Flamenco was developed in the Calé Romani culture of Southern Spain. Many famous Spanish flamenco musicians are of Romani ethnicity. The rumba flamenca and rumba catalana are styles mixing flamenco and Cuban guaracha, developed by Andalusian and Catalan gitanos.

Urban genres such as hip-hop, trap music and reggaeton are also among the Spanish Roma community.

=== Marriage ===
The traditional Spanish Romani place a high value on the extended family. Virginity is essential in unmarried women. Both men and women often marry young.

A traditional gitano wedding requires a pedimiento (similar to an engagement party) followed by the casamiento (wedding ceremony), where el yeli must be sung to the bride to celebrate the virginity and honour of the bride (proven by the ritual of the pañuelo). In the pañuelo ritual, a group consisting of an ajuntaora (a professional who is skilled in performing the ritual and is paid by the family), along with the married women of the family, take the bride into a separate room during the wedding and examine her to ascertain that she is a virgin. The ajuntaora is the one who performs the ritual on the bride, as the other women watch to be witnesses that the bride is virgin. The ajuntaora wraps a white, decoratively embroidered cloth (the pañuelo) around her index finger and inserts it shallowly into the vaginal canal of the bride. During this process, the Bartholin's glands are depressed, causing them to secrete a liquid that stains the cloth. This action is repeated with three different sections of the cloth to produce three stains, known as "rosas". This process is conceived by the women as the retrieval of the bride's "honra", her honour, contained within a "grape" inside her genitals which is popped during the examination, and the spillage collected onto the pañuelo.

When finished with the exam, the women come out of the room and sing el yeli to the couple. During this, the men at the wedding rip their shirts and lift the wife onto their shoulders and do the same with the husband, as they sing "el yeli" to them. Weddings can last very long; up to three days is usual in Gitano culture. At weddings, gitanos invite everyone and anyone that they know of (especially other gitanos). On some occasions, payos (gadjos) may attend as well, although this is not common. Through the night, many bulerías are danced and especially sung. Today, rumba gitana or rumba flamenca are usual party music fixtures.

Gitanos may also marry by elopement, an event that garners less approval than a wedding ceremony.

=== Cuisine ===
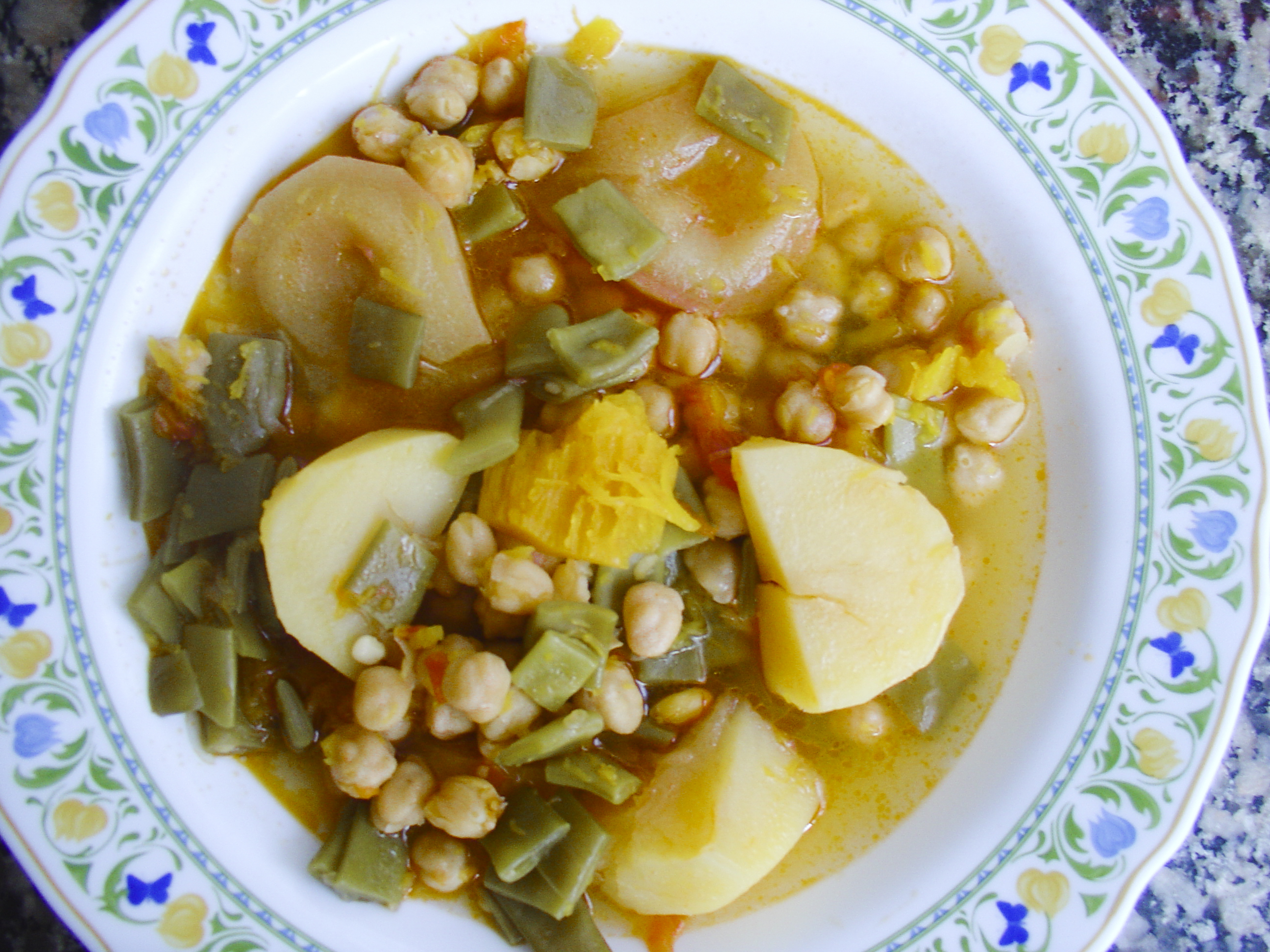
Olla gitana

Gachas and flamenquines are popular foods among Spanish Roma. Gitanos use chickpeas, fennel and saffron. Wine and tea are popular beverages. La Cocina Gitana de Matilde Amaya is a Romani cookbook published in Spain in 2002. Stews, rice dishes, and hearty meals are typical of Gitano cuisine. In Romani households, Café Gitano (coffee) is commonly offered to guests as a sign of hospitality.

== Marginalisation ==
Marginalisation occurs on an institutional level. Gitano children are regularly segregated from their non-gitano peers and have poorer academic outcomes. In 1978, 68% of adult gitanos were illiterate. Literacy rates have improved over time; the percentage of illiterate gitanos dropped to approximately 10% in 2007 (with older gitanos more likely than younger gitanos to be illiterate). 98% of gitanos live below the poverty line. In 2019, another study put 89% of children under the poverty line and 51.8% under extreme poverty. Health outcomes and housing – including reduced access to clean water and electricity supplies – are worse amongst Roma compared to non-Roma in Spain and Portugal, in common with the other surveyed European countries.

52% of gitano homes could apply to the Spanish Minimum Vital Income, but only 29% actually receive it, due to the complexity of the procedure and the delays in processing.

Roma continue to experience discrimination on an interpersonal level, such as by being refused entry to bars and clubs or losing their jobs if their ethnicity is made known to their employer. In 2016, the European Union Agency for Fundamental Rights reported that its survey showed 71% of Portuguese cigano, and 51% of Spanish gitano had suffered an episode of discrimination within the previous five years. A traditional discriminatory practice in Portugal, where shops and businesses display toad figurines at entrances to dissuade ciganos from entering, was reported as being still widely seen in Portugal in 2019. (Toads are viewed as symbolic of evil and ill-omen in Roma communities in Portugal.) Ciganos and anti-discrimination activists complained of hostility to Roma being commonplace. Some shopkeepers were noted as defending their discouragement of Roma as appropriate.

The 2016 Pew Research poll found that 49% of Spaniards held unfavorable views of gitanos.

A study conducted in 1999 found that Romani represent 1.5% of the Spanish population, but account for 25% of all female prisoners in Spain; 60% of these prisoners have been locked up for drug charges. There is no research on the percentage of male Romani prisoners, although it generally tends to be slightly less percentage wise compared to their female counterparts.

The Spanish media often stereotypes Romani people as thugs, thieves and outlaws who don't want to work and have no education. Romani men are stereotyped to be thugs, gangsters, drug dealers, dangerous thieves and robbers in Spain. Gitano men are also stereotyped to be hypersexual thugs, lustful, masculine, violent, sexist, macho criminals and drug dealers with a uncontrollable sex drive who use women for sexual pleasure. Gitano men are often stereotyped to be bad boys. These negative stereotypes have resulted in their marginalization. Gitano women are stereotyped to be promiscuous and sexually available in Spanish literature. Gitanas are also stereotyped to be dangerous, criminal, seductive, sexy hypersexual prostitutes and sensual seductresses with a high sex drive.

== History ==
The "Great Gypsy Round-up" in 1749 sought to eliminate Romani culture through forced labor and separation rather than through mass extermination. Many victims died due to harsh conditions, including forced work in mines, naval arsenals, and prisons, with numerous individuals perishing from exhaustion, mistreatment, or while awaiting death in military custody. At that time, Gaspar Vázquez Tablada, the governor of the Council of Castile and the highest political authority in the Spanish monarchy, submitted a proposal to King Ferdinand VI on July 5, 1747. This "consultation" recommended implementing "extraordinary measures" to permanently resolve the so-called public order issues allegedly caused by the Romani people.

== Health ==
In Spain, Romani individuals are more prone to abusing hard drugs, tobacco, and alcohol as a result of discrimination and social exclusion. The findings indicate that these risky behaviors among the Spanish Roma community may increase their likelihood of contracting HIV, hepatitis, and other blood-borne and sexually transmitted infections.

== Crime ==
Romani people are often involved in selling illegal drugs such as cocaine in Spain. In Madrid, Romani children are forced to steal at cash machines. Romani children often steal when the cardholder is distracted, which allows the Roma child to grab the money and run away. Romani people are often accused of being responsible for many scams and fraud cases in Spain.

== In literature ==
The gitano in Spanish society have inspired several authors:

- Federico García Lorca, a great Spanish poet of the 20th century, wrote Romancero Gitano ("Gypsy Ballad Book")

The Roma is the most basic, most profound, the most aristocratic of my country, as representative of their way and whoever keeps the flame, blood, and the alphabet of the universal Andalusian truth.

— Federico García Lorca

- Candela, the female protagonist of the story El Amor Brujo by Manuel de Falla is Romani.
- Prosper Mérimée's Carmen (1845) features the protagonist as a femme fatale, ready to lie, or attack and degrade men's lives. His work was adapted for Georges Bizet's opera of the same name.
- The beauty of a dark-haired Gitana has inspired artists such as Julio Romero de Torres.
- La Gitanilla ("The little Gypsy girl"), short story by Miguel de Cervantes and part of his Exemplary Novels
- Rocio Eva Granada, the escort in the novel Digital Fortress by Dan Brown

== Gallery ==

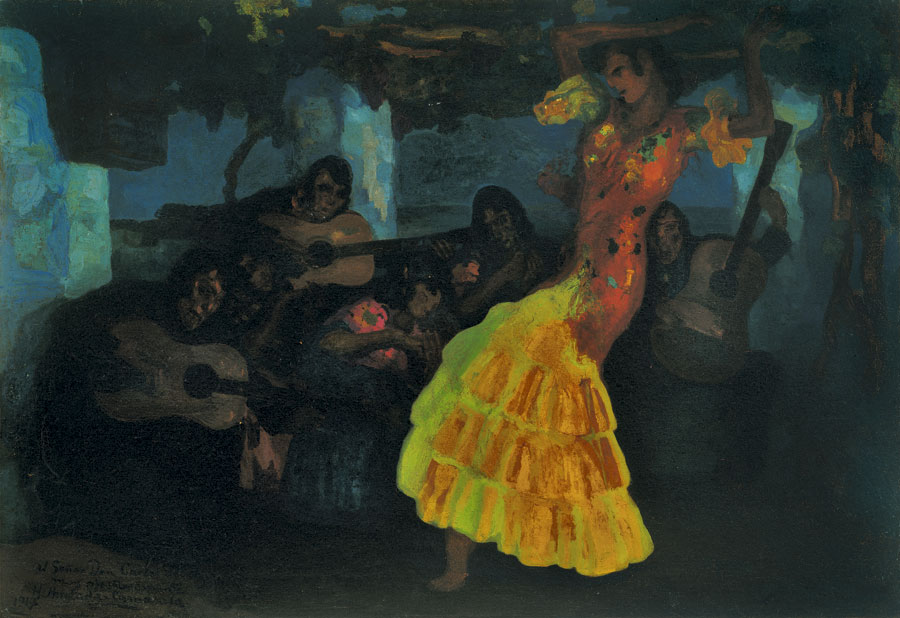

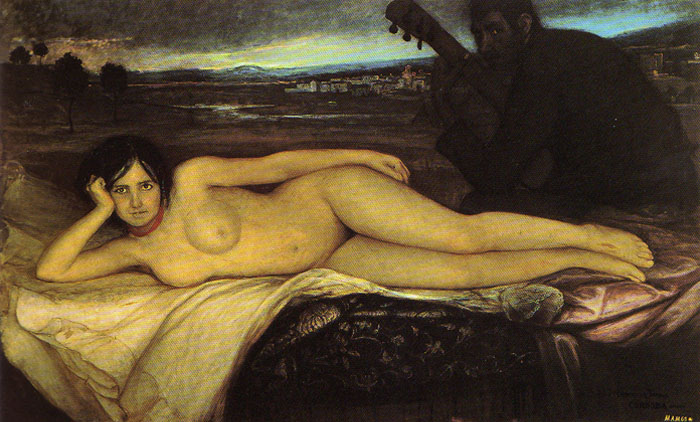

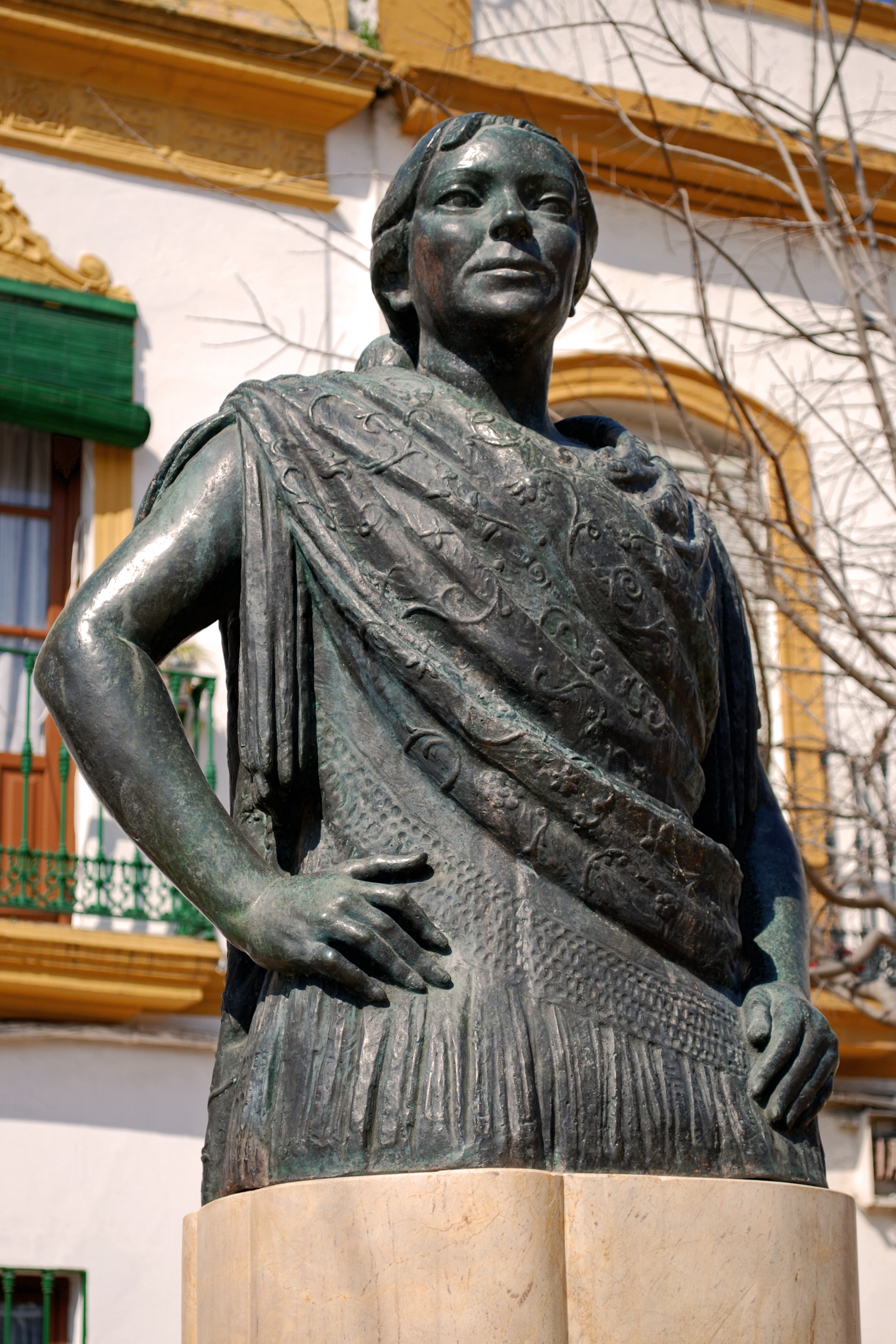

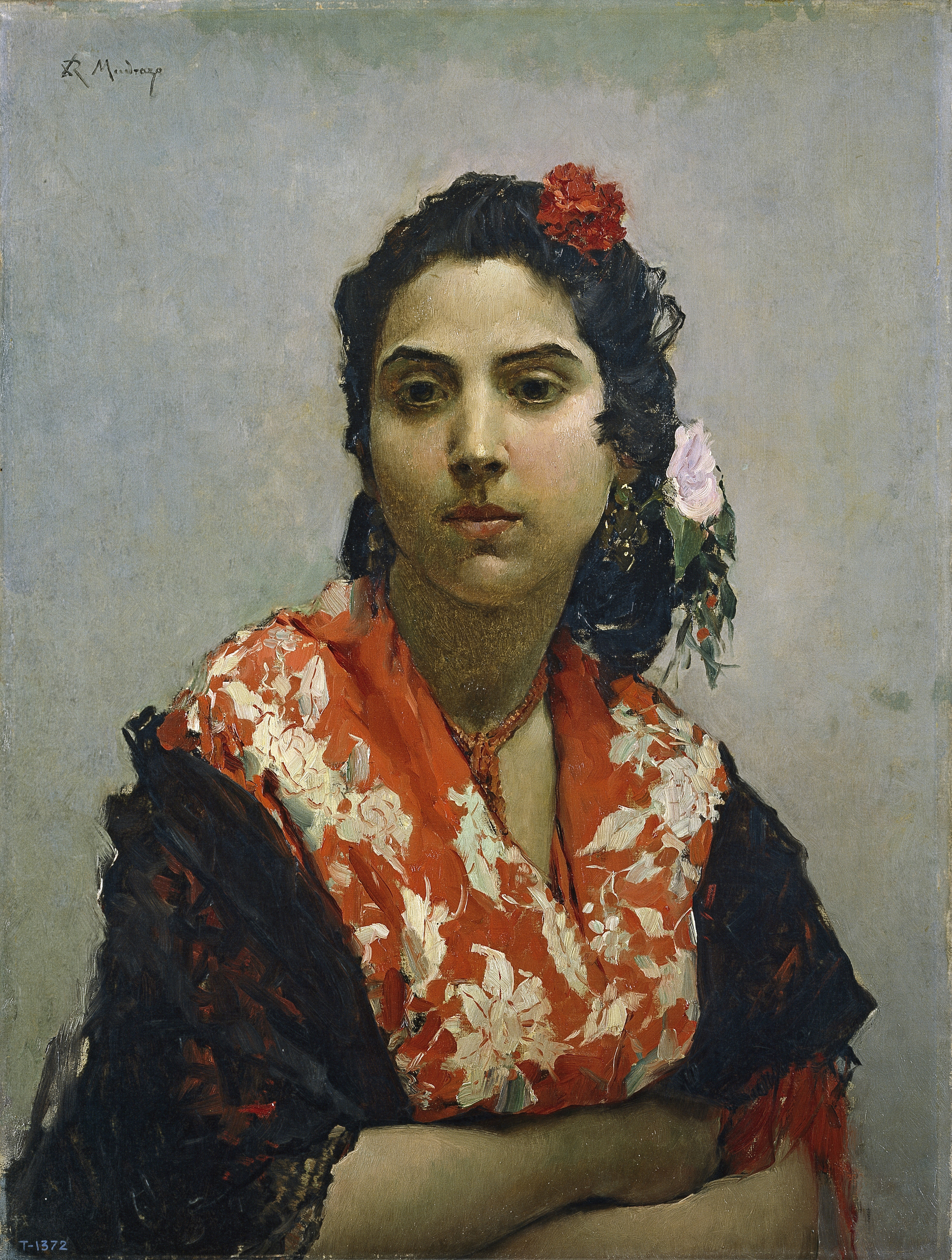

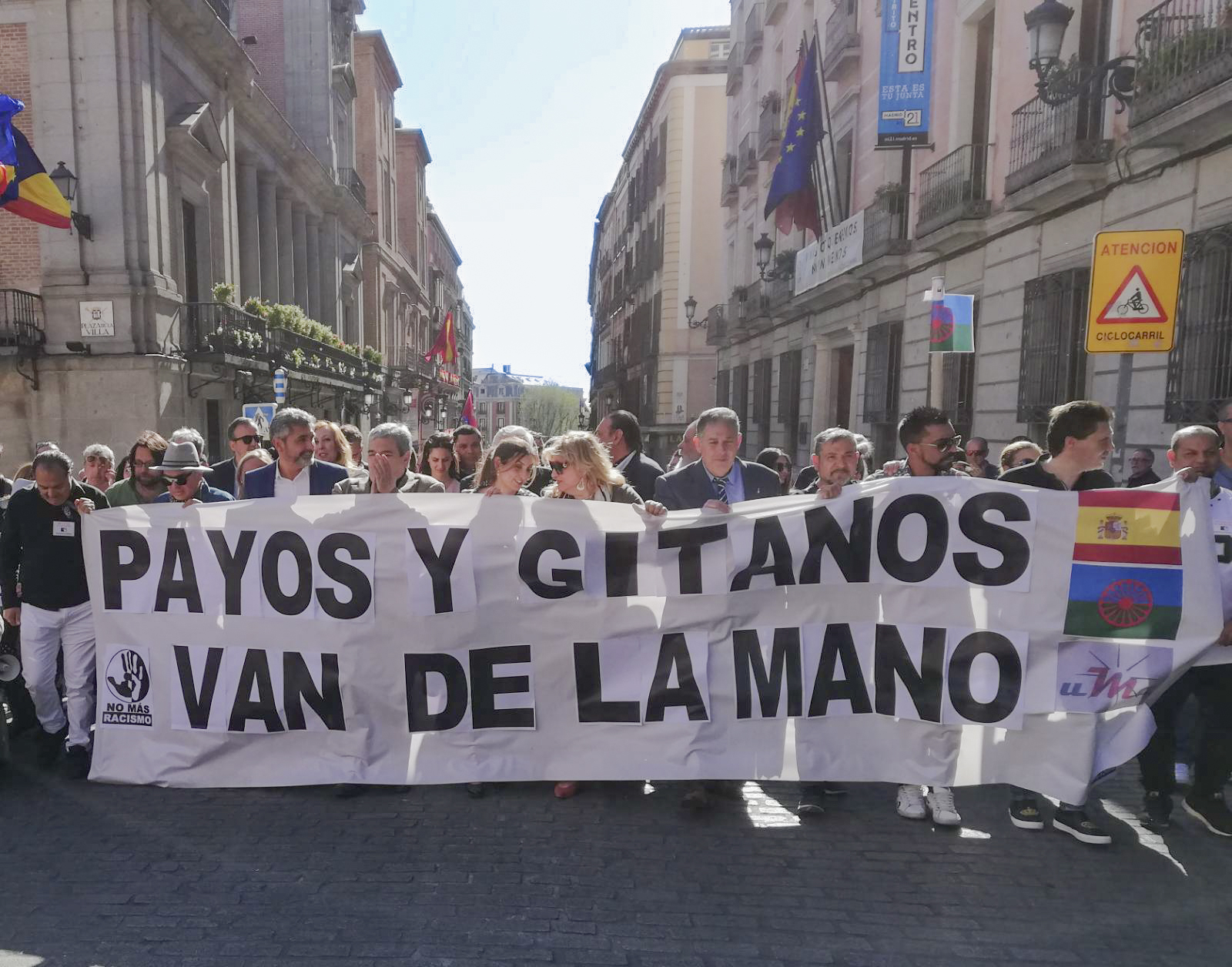

== Notable gitanos ==
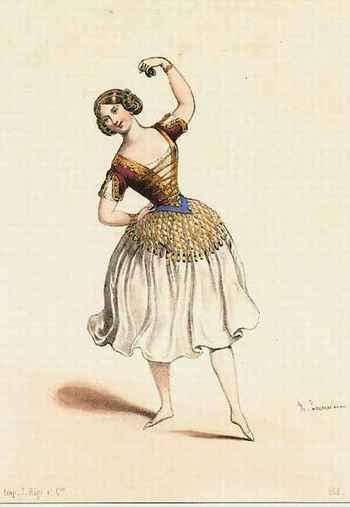
The ballet dancer Carlotta Grisi as the Romani Paquita (1844)

=== Leaders and politicians ===
- Juan de Dios Ramírez Heredia, Spanish Socialist Workers' Party MEP
- Sara Giménez Giménez, Spanish Roma politician in Citizens political party
- Mariano R. Vázquez, general secretary of the CNT (1936–1939)
- Séfora Vargas, Spanish Gypsy political activist and lawyer

=== Historians, philologists and writers ===
- Silvia Agüero, feminist writer
- Joaquín Albaicín, writer, lecturer and columnist for the artistic life
- Matéo Maximoff, French writer born in Barcelona

=== Poets, novelists and playwrights ===
- José Heredia Maya, poet and dramaturge
- Luis Heredia Amaya, sculptor
- Antonio Maya Cortés, artist painter and sculptor
- Fabian de Castro, artist painter

=== Catholic saints and martyrs ===
- Ceferino Giménez Malla, blessed
- Emilia Fernández Rodríguez, the Basket Weaver, blessed

=== Painters and sculptors ===
- Helios Gómez, artist, writer and poet
- Juan Vargas, sculptor

=== Actors, comedians and entertainers ===
- Rogelio Durán, theatre actor and father of Swedish actress Noomi Rapace
- Pastora Vega, actress
- Alba Flores, actress; granddaughter of Antonio González (El Pescaílla) and daughter of singer Antonio Flores
- Jesús Castro (actor), actor of film The Niño.
- El Comandante Lara, comedian and singer
- Juan Rosa Mateo, comedian of Duo Sacapuntas

=== Footballers and football coaches ===
- José Antonio Reyes, ex-footballer, for Arsenal F.C., Sevilla FC...
- José Rodríguez Martínez, footballer, currently plays for Maccabi Haifa F.C.
- Jesús Seba, footballer, ex-Real Zaragoza
- Diego, former footballer, with Sevilla Fútbol Club (Sevilla FC)
- Carlos Muñoz, former footballer, with Real Oviedo
- Carlos Aranda, former footballer, with Sevilla FC
- Ivan Amaya, former footballer, with Atletico Madrid
- Antonio Amaya, footballer, for Rayo Vallecano
- Marcos Márquez, footballer, ex-UD Las Palmas
- López Ramos, footballer, ex-UD Las Palmas
- Antonio Cortés Heredia, footballer for Málaga
- Ezequiel Calvente, ex-footballer Real Betis
- Téji Savanier, footballer frech of the origin calo Spanish, footballer Montpellier
- Jesús Navas, footballer, with Sevilla FC

=== Other athletes ===
- José Antonio Jiménez, boxer
- Faustino Reyes, boxer
- Joaquín Rodríguez Ortega, known as "Cagancho", Spanish bullfighter
- Patxi Ruiz Giménez, Basque pelota champion
- Rafael Soto, equestrian and Olympic medalist

=== Singers and musicians ===
- Carmen Amaya, Flamenco dancer
- Isabel Pantoja, singer, partially Calé
- Los Chunguitos, singers, brother duet
- Azúcar Moreno, singers, sister duet
- Manolo Caracol, Flamenco singer
- El Pescaílla, singer and composer, husband of Lola Flores
- Lolita Flores, singer and actress, daughter of Lola Flores and El Pescaílla
- Antonio Flores, singer and actor, son of Lola Flores and El Pescaílla
- Rosario Flores, singer and actress, daughter of Lola Flores and El Pescaílla
- Vicente Escudero, dancer and choreographer of Spanish Flamenco; occasionally painter, writer, cinematographic actor and flamenco singer
- Gipsy Kings, French group of Rumba flamenca
- Camarón de la Isla, Flamenco singer
- Farruquito, Flamenco dancer
- Los Niños de Sara, French fusion musicians
- Ketama, fusion musicians
- Kendji Girac, French singer
- Diego "El Cigala", Flamenco singer
- Joaquín Cortés, star flamenco dancer
- Beatriz Luengo, singer and actress
- Natalia Jiménez, singer and vocalist of La quinta estacion
- Jorge González, singer
- Manitas de Plata, guitar player
- Peret, Catalan singer, guitar player and composer of Catalan rumba
- Camela, singers of Spanish musical group of techno rumba and flamenco pop.
- Los Chichos, singers
- Las Grecas, singers
- Estrella Morente, singer
- Niña Pastori, singer and composer
- Belén Maya, bailaora (Flamenco dancer)
- Juan Villar, cantaor (Flamenco singer)
- José Mercé, cantaor (Flamenco singer)
- El Príncipe Gitano, cantaor (Flamenco singer) and bailaor (Flamenco dancer)
- Dolores Vargas, "La Terremoto" cantaora (Flamenco singer) and bailaora (Flamenco dancer)
- Gerardo Núñez, guitarist and composer
- Mario Maya, cantaor and bailaor
- Tomatito, Flamenco guitarist and composer
- Remedios Amaya, cantaora
- Falete, cantaor (Flamenco singer)
- La Chunga, bailaora (Flamenco dancer)
- Manuel Agujetas, cantaor
- Antonio Mairena, cantaor
- Manuel Torre, cantaor
- La Niña de los Peines, cantaora (Flamenco singer)
- Pastora Imperio, bailaora
- Chiquetete, cantaor
- El Lebrijano, Flamenco guitarist
- Paco Cepero, Flamenco guitarist
- Vicente Soto Sordera, cantaor
- Cancanilla de Marbella, cantaor and bailaor
- Perla de Cádiz, cantaora
- Manzanita, singer and guitarist
- Moraito Chico, guitarist of Flamenco
- Diego Carrasco, cantaor and guitarist
- Mala Rodríguez, singer
- La Serneta, cantaora
- Antonia La Negra, cantaora
- Lole y Manuel, Flamenco singers
- Alba Molina, singer
- Rancapino, cantaor
- Sabicas, Flamenco Guitarist
- Pilar Montoya, bailaora
- Juana la Macarrona, cantaora
- Antonio Carmona, singer of Flamenco
- La Macanita, cantaora
- Pansequito, cantaor

=== Gitano surnames ===
Due to endogamy, several Spanish surnames are more frequent among the Gitanos, though they are not exclusive to them:

- Altamira or Altamirano
- Amaya
- Antunes or Antúnez (alternatively, Antuñez)
- Calaf (Catalan Gypsy)
- Cortés
- Fernández
- Flores
- Gabarri (Catalan Gypsy)
- Gutiérrez or Guiterez
- Heredia
- Jiménez or Giménez
- Malla or Maya
- Molina
- Montoya
- Monge or Monje
- Moreno
- Morgade
- Motos
- Pereiro or Pereira
- Pubill (Catalan Gypsy)
- Ravelino or Rabellino
- Reyes
- Sandoval
- Salazar
- Santi
- Santiago
- Vargas LP
- Villar or Vilar
- Viso
- Carretero
- Pérez
- González
- Escudero
- Ximénez

== See also ==
- Timeline of Romani history
- History of the Romani people
- Roma Route, research project in Europe
- Romani diaspora
- List of Romani settlements
- List of Romani people
- Triana, Seville, a neighbourhood traditionally linked to Gitano history.
- Sacromonte, the traditional Gitano quarter of Granada.
- George Borrow, an English missionary and traveller who studied the Calé of Spain and other parts of Europe.
- Quinqui, a nomad community of Spain with a similar lifestyle, but of unrelated origin.
- Cagot, similarly historically persecuted people in France and Spain.
- Cascarots, an ethnic group in the Spanish Basque country and the French Basque coast sometimes linked to the Cagots.
- Cleanliness of blood, ethnic discrimination in the Spanish Old Regime.
- Maragato, an ethnic group in Spain who were also discriminated against and have unknown origins.
- Vaqueiros de alzada, a discriminated group of cowherders in Northern Spain.
- Xueta a persecuted ethnic minority in Mallorca, often referenced in works discussing the persecution of Cagots in Spain.
