= Montoya =

Montoya is a Basque and Spanish surname. It originally comes from a hamlet near Berantevilla in Álava, in the Basque region of northern Spain. During the Reconquista, it extended southwards throughout Castille and Andalusia. The name roughly translates to mean hills and valleys. It has become more frequent among Gitanos than among the general Spanish population.

People with the surname Montoya include:

- Adam Montoya (born 1984), American video game commentator, better known as SeaNanners
- Al Montoya (born 1985), American ice hockey goaltender in the National Hockey League
- Aldo Montoya, a former ring persona of American professional wrestler Peter Polaco (born 1973), better known as Justin Credible
- Carlos Montoya (1903–1993), Spanish flamenco guitarist and son of Ramón Montoya
- Craig Montoya (born 1970), American rock musician
- Daniela Montoya (born 1990), Colombian footballer
- David Montoya (born 1978), Colombian footballer
- Diego León Montoya Sánchez (born 1958 or 1961), Colombian cocaine trafficker on the FBI Ten Most Wanted Fugitives list
- Eliud Montoya, American whistleblower and murder victim
- Gabriel Montoya,(1868–1914), French chansonnier
- Gustavo Montoya (1905–2003), Mexican painter
- Jennifer Montoya (born 1985), Colombian journalist and news presenter
- José Montoya (1932–2013), Chicano bilingual poet
- Joseph Montoya (1915–78), U.S. Senator from New Mexico
- Joseph B. Montoya (1939–2022), American politician from California
- Juan Pablo Montoya (born 1975), Colombian motor racing IndyCar driver and former NASCAR and Formula One driver
- Julián Montoya (born 1993), hooker for the Argentina national rugby union team
- María Laura de Jesús Montoya Upegui (1874–1949), Colombian saint (Roman Catholic)
- Martha Montoya, Colombian American cartoonist and businesswoman
- Martín Montoya (born 1991), Spanish association football player
- Martina Vigil-Montoya (1856–1916), Native American ceramics painter from San Ildefonso Pueblo, New Mexico
- Matilde Montoya (1859–1939), presumably the first female physician in Mexico to hold an academic degree
- Nestór Montoya, (1862–1923), United States Representative from New Mexico
- Pilar Montoya (1960–2015), Spanish flamenco dancer
- Ramón Montoya (1880–1949), Spanish flamenco guitarist and father of Carlos Montoya
- Ramón Montoya (baseball), Mexican baseball player (see Mexican Professional Baseball Hall of Fame)
- Richelle Montoya, American politician
- Rose Montoya, American model, internet celebrity, and transgender activist
- Rubén Montoya (born 1940), Argentine footballer
- Sebastián Montoya (born 2005), Colombian and American racing driver
- Sergio Luis Henao Montoya, or Sergio Henao (born 1987), Colombian bicycle road racer

Groups of people

- Las Hermanas Montoya, Latin singing group, active 1948–1969

== Fictional characters ==
- Carmelita Montoya Fox, a female INTERPOL officer from the Sly Cooper series of video games
- Inigo Montoya, a fencer from William Goldman's novel The Princess Bride and the movie from the novel
- Domingo Montoya, father of Inigo Montoya from The Princess Bride
- Nemi Montoya, Norwegian comic book character
- Renee Montoya, police detective in DC Comics' Gotham City Police Department
- Josefina Montoya, an American Girl character residing in Santa Fe in 1824
- Gabriel Montoya, one of the Spanish assassins from the 2015 film Bill
- Alejandro Montoya, "El Aguila" mutant appearing in Marvel Comics, 1st appearance in Power Man & Iron Fist #58 (Aug. 1979)

== See also ==
- Montóia, Portuguese surname
