= Silvia Agüero =

Spanish writer (born 1985)

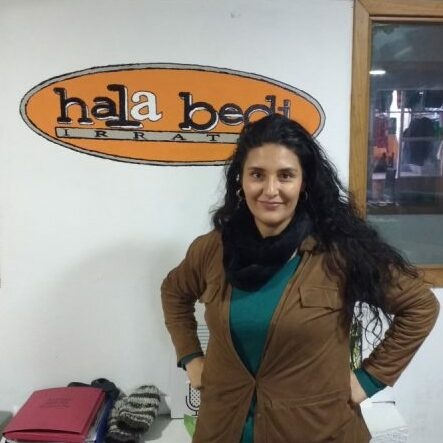
- (2019)
- Born: Silvia Agüero Fernández; 24 August 1985 (age 41); Vallecas, Madrid, Spain
- Occupations: feminist writer; human rights activist
- Writing career
- Movement: recovering the memory of the oppression of gitano people

Silvia Agüero (born 24 August 1985) is a Spanish feminist writer and human rights activist who recovers the memory of the oppression of the gitanos.

== Biography ==
Silvia Agüero Fernández was born in Vallecas (a district in Madrid) into a gadjo family who espoused an anti-gypsy ideology. Silvia became aware of what it meant to belong to Romani society and culture and created an intercultural association led by Roma people: Pretendemos Gitanizar el Mundo (We intend to Romaize the World). She leads the Revolución de las Rosas Romaní (Revolution of the Roma Roses), an activist group against abuse during childbirth. She coordinates the Plataforma Rosa Cortés. She collaborates with the community radio station Radio Vallekas, with Pikara Magazine, and with AraInfo.

While living in La Rioja, Agüero appeared on the Podemos lists for the 2020 municipal elections. Among her inspirations are the flamenco singer La Paquera de Jerez, the lawyer Pastora Filigrana, and Rosa Cortés, the protagonist of the Great Gypsy Round-up of 1749.

In the book Resistencias Gitanas, written together with Nicolás Jiménez, they denounce the erasure of the history of the gypsy people. Examples of this are the absence of Roma repression in the school curriculum, the ignorance of the model of resistance of Roma women to the laws of Felipe II, or the questioning of the anti-Roma cultural model, such as the stereotype of La gitanilla by Miguel de Cervantes. All of this is behind the discrimination that the Roma people continue to face.

In 2022, together with the actress and director Nüll García, and with the acting support of Pamela Palenciano, Agüero created the theatrical monologue, No soy tu gitana at the Teatro del Barrio that deconstructs the historical public image of gypsy women from 1499 to the present. García directs Agüero in this work whose name is inspired by the title of the documentary film I Am Not Your Negro, based on the work of the American writer and civil rights activist, James Baldwin.

== Selected works ==
- 2019 – Disidencia en el cuerpo: perspectivas feministas. VVAA. Editorial Menades. ISBN 978-84-120204-0-3
- 2020 – Resistencias gitanas. Junto a Nicolás Jiménez. Libros.com. ISBN 9788418261718
- 2021 – Pretendemos Gitanizar el mundo. Revista. VVAA. ISSN 2660-9908
- 2022 – Mi Feminismo es Gitano. Monograph with Maria Ágeles Fernández. Píkara Magazine.
- 2022 – No soy tu gitana. with Nüll García. Monólogo teatral.
