= Antonia La Negra =

Musical artist (1935 - 2018)

- Also known as: Antonia La Negra
- Born: Antonia Rodríguez Moreno; 1935/1936; Orán, French Algeria
- Died: 7 March 2018 Seville, Spain
- Genre: Flamenco
- Occupations: Cantaora and bailaora
- Instrument: Vocals

Antonia La Negra, artistic name of Antonia Rodríguez Moreno (1935/1936 – 7 March 2018), was a Spanish Gitana cantaora and bailaora (flamenco dancer). Wife of the bailaor Juan Montoya, mother of the singer Lole Montoya, of the duet Lole y Manuel, and grandmother of the singer Alba Molina.

== Biography ==
Daughter of a Jerez-born mother and Seville-born father, her parents emigrated to French Algeria, where Antonia was born. She later moved with her family to Tangier, Spanish Protectorate of Morocco, learning to speak Arabic fluently.

Aged 10 or 12, she moved with her family to her father's native Triana, Seville. At age 16, she wed a cousin, bailaor Juan Montoya. Some time later, with her brothers-in-law and a niece, Carmelilla, she formed La Familia Montoya in the 1970s, which successfully presented the most intimate and spontaneous facets of flamenco. Her art was reflected in Triana (1976), En familia (1978), Macama jonda (1983), El ángel (1993) and Un gitano de ley (1997). She participated in two audiovisual summits of flamenco: El ángel and Rito y geografía del cante. La Negra has been one of the main figures of cante jondo, excelling her talent in palos such as flamenco tango and bulería.
