= Faraona =

Faraona (Spanish for female pharaoh) may refer to:

- Lola Flores (1923–1995), Spanish singer, actress, dancer and businesswoman, known as La Faraona
- Pilar Montoya (1960–2015), Spanish Romani flamenco dancer, known as La Faraona
- La Faraona (film), a 1956 Mexican film starring Lola Flores and featuring Anita Blanch
