= Carretero =

Carretero is a surname. Notable people with the surname include:

- Andrés Manuel Carretero (1927–2004), Argentine essayist and self-taught historian
- Héctor Carretero (born 1995), Spanish cyclist riding for Movistar Team
- Joan Carretero (born 1955), mayor of Puigcerdà and minister in the Catalan Government
- Nilo Carretero (born 1986), Argentine footballer
- Ramón Carretero (born 1990), Panamanian racing cyclist
- Roberto Carretero (born 1975), Spanish former professional tennis player

See also:

- Andrés Carretero Pérez (born 1955), Spanish historian
- Lluís Pujals i Carretero (born 1966), Catalan musician and painter
