= Pastora Filigrana =

Spanish Roma lawyer and trade unionist

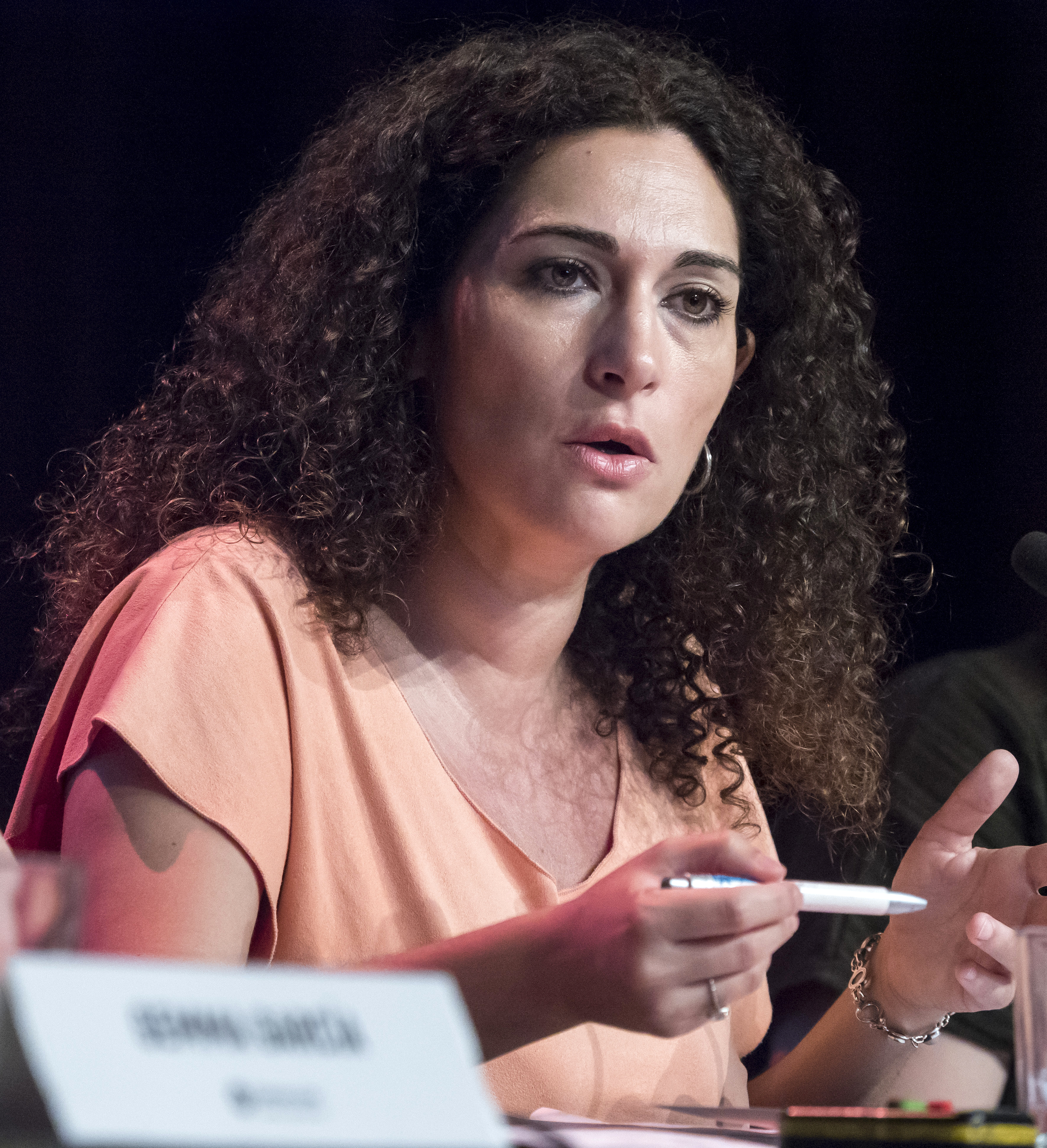
- (2019)
- Born: Pastora Filigrana García; 26 May 1981 (age 45); Triana, Seville, Spain
- Education: University of Seville; Pablo de Olavide University
- Occupations: Labour lawyer; trade unionist; columnist
- Known for: feminist; human rights activist
- Notable work: El pueblo gitano contra el sistema mundo. Unas reflexiones desde un activismo feminista y anticapitalista

Pastora Filigrana (born 26 May 1981) is a Spanish Roma lawyer, trade unionist, feminist, columnist, and human rights activist.

== Early life and education ==
Pastora Filigrana García was born in the Triana neighborhood of Seville. At the age of nine, it was already said the child was going to be "the gypsy lawyer". Growing up "in a ghetto" gave her a lot of social sensitivity towards issues related to equality from a young age. She learned what the class consciousness of grandmothers is "with their example of life" and labor law in the Andalusian Workers' Union.

After participating in the creation of the Asociación de Mujeres Gitanas Universitarias (Association of University Gypsy Women) (Amuradi), she graduated in law at the age of 23 from the University of Seville.

== Career ==
Filigrana's career began as a legal adviser for the Villela Or Gao Caló, a Roma association in the Seville neighborhood of Las 3000 Viviendas, also working with the migrant population. Later, she completed a Master's in Human Rights, Interculturality, and Development taught by the Pablo de Olavide University.

As a lawyer, Filigrana had an important role in the media in the struggles of the Moroccan strawberry harvesters of Huelva during 2019, at the same time that she warned of the causes of the electoral rise of the far-right. In 2020, she published the book El pueblo gitano contra el sistema mundo. Unas reflexiones desde un activismo feminista y anticapitalista (The Gypsy People Against the World System. Some reflections from a feminist and anti-capitalist activist), in which she argues that the persecution of the Roma people has to do with their forms of community resistance through cooperation and mutual aid, and their opposition to adapting to "salary blackmail".

== Selected works ==
- 2019: Descolonizar y despatriarcalizar Andalucía. Una mirada feminista gitana-andaluza en Miradas en torno al problema colonial. ISBN 978-84-460-4850-3
- 2020: Desafío, el virus no es el único peligro, Ediciones Akal ISBN 978-84-460-4975-3
- 2020: El pueblo gitano contra el sistema mundo. Unas reflexiones desde un activismo feminista y anticapitalista, Ediciones Akal, ISBN 978-607-8683-18-5
