= Monje =

Monje may refer to:

- Carlos Monje Serrano (born 1990), commonly known as Chirri, Spanish footballer
- Daan Monjé (1925–1986), Dutch politician and activist
- Fernando Álvarez Monje (born 1968), Mexican politician affiliated with the National Action Party
- Fernando Monje (born 1993), Spanish racing driver who competes in the World Touring Car Championship
- Gustavo Monje (born 1971), Argentine stage actor and director
- Jonathan Monje (born 1981), Chilean long-distance runner
- José Malcampo y Monje, 3rd Marquis of San Rafael (1828–1880), Spanish noble, admiral and politician
- Jose Monje Cruz (1950–1992), known as Camarón de la Isla, Spanish flamenco romani singer
- Juan Andrés Rodríguez (El Monje) (born 1930), Cuban artist specializing in painting and drawing
- Julieta Mabel Monje, Bolivian politician and lawyer
- Leonardo Monje (born 1981), Chilean retired footballer
- Mario Monje, the Secretary-General of the PCB, the Communist Party of Bolivia
- Monje de Montaudo (1193–1210), born Pèire de Vic, a nobleman, monk, and troubadour from the Auvergne
- Tomás Monje (1884–1954), 48th President of Bolivia between August 1946 and March 1947
- Vicente Monje (born 1981), Argentinian footballer who last played for Central Norte

== See also ==
- El monje blanco, a 1945 Mexican historical drama film
- Paul Monje House, historic home located at Washington, Franklin County, Missouri
- SNGC Colonel Alfonso Monje (82-1), 82-foot Point class cutter constructed at Curtis Bay, Maryland in 1960
- Monj (disambiguation)
- Monjvek
- Mošnje
