= Alba Molina =

Spanish-Romani singer (born 1978)

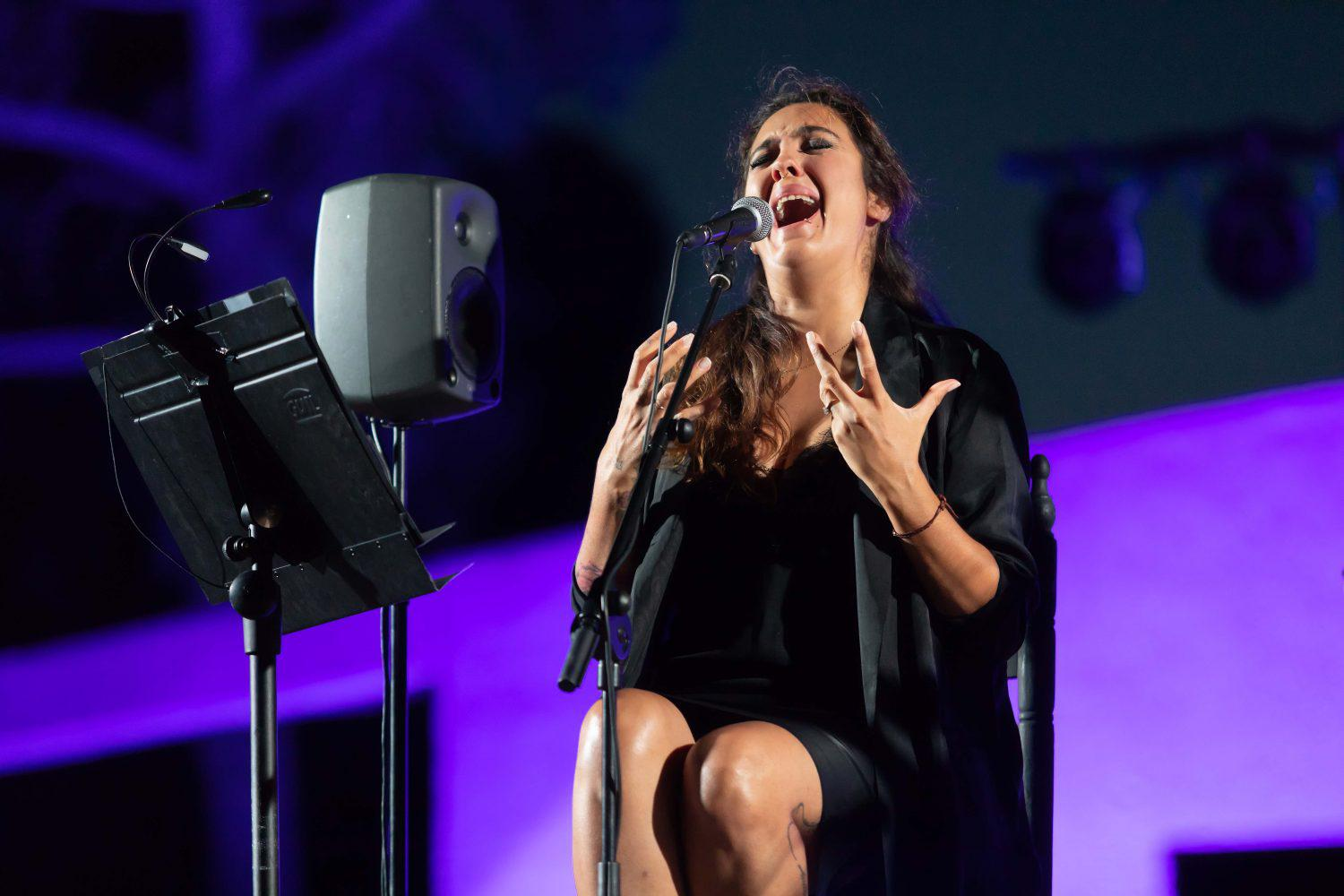
- Molina performing in 2018

Background information
- Born: Alba Molina Montoya; November 26, 1978 (age 47); Seville, Spain
- Genres: flamenco; hip hop; pop
- Occupation: Singer
- Instrument: Vocals

Alba Molina Montoya (born 1978) is a Spanish-Romani singer who performs flamenco as well as hip hop and other forms of pop music. The daughter of the flamenco couple Lole Montoya and Manuel Molina, she collaborated with Las Niñas from the late 1990s and later with Spanish guitarist Ricardo Moreno producing Tucara (2009). More recently she has honoured her parents with the albums Alba canta a Lole y Manuel (2016) and Caminando con Manuel (2017).

== Biography ==
Born in Seville on 26 November 1978, Alba Molina is the daughter of the flamenco performers Lole Montoya Rodríguez (born 1954) and Manuel Molina Jiménez (1948–2015) and the granddaughter of Antonia Rodriguez Moreno (1936–2018), a Romani flamenco singer and dancer known as La Negra.

Molina's first appearance was when as a 12-year-old she appeared as a model. Two years later, she won the title "Miss Elegancia" at the Jerez de la Frontera beauty contest. She went on to become a singer, releasing her first single Despacito in 1998. In the early 2000s, together with Aurora Power and Vicky G. Luna, she sang as one of Las Niñas, combining flamenco with pop. In addition to several singles, they released the albums Ojú (2003) and Savia Negra (2005). More recently she has honoured her parents with the albums Alba canta a Lole y Manuel (2016) and Caminando con Manuel (2017).
