= Puente de Isabel II =

Triana Bridge Puente de Isabel II
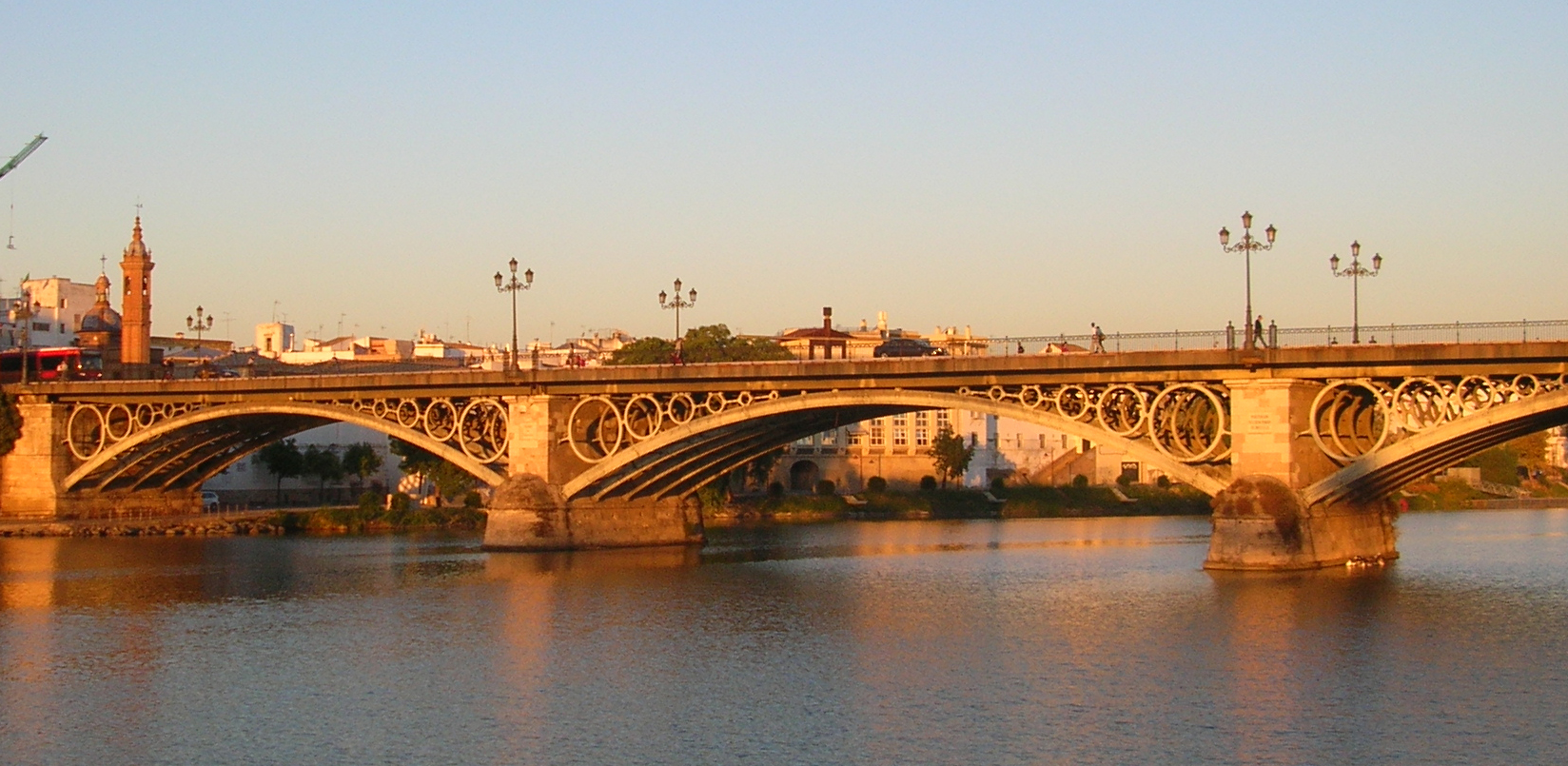
- Coordinates: 37.386222°N 6.002333°W
- Crosses: Guadalquivir
- Locale: Seville, Spain

Characteristics
- Total length: 149 metres (489 ft)
- Height: 99 metres (325 ft)

History
- Inaugurated: 1852

The Puente de Isabel II, Puente de Triana or Triana Bridge, is a metal arch bridge in Seville, Spain, that connects the Triana neighbourhood with the centre of the city. It crosses the Canal de Alfonso XIII, one of the arms of the River Guadalquivir that isolate Triana as an almost-island.

It was built during the reign of Isabella II of Spain and completed in 1852 as the first solid bridge in Seville, replacing an earlier floating bridge consisting of boats (a pontoon bridge). First built by the Moors in the 12th century, the pontoon bridge managed to exist for seven centuries due to later repairs.

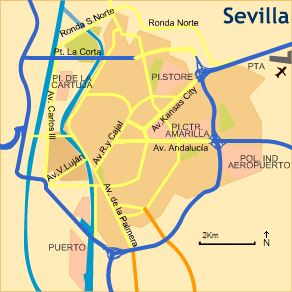
Map of Seville
