= Ceferino Giménez Malla =

Spanish Romani catechist (1861–1936)

Blessed Ceferino Giménez Malla O.F.S.
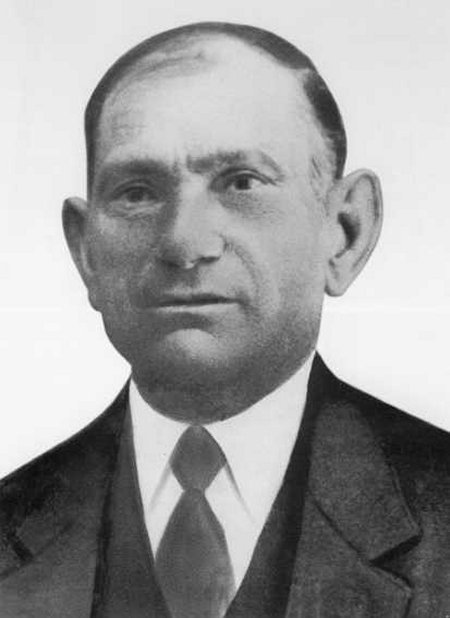
- Ceferino Giménez Malla between 1910 and 1920
- Born: 26 August 1861; Fraga, Huesca Province, Spain
- Died: 9 August 1936 (aged 74); Barbastro, Huesca Province, Spain
- Venerated in: Catholic Church
- Beatified: 4 May 1997 by Pope John Paul II
- Feast: August 2
- Patronage: Romani people

Ceferino Giménez Malla (also known as El Pelé, "the Strong One", or "the Brave One"; 26 August 1861 – 9 August 1936) was a Spanish Romani Catholic catechist and activist. A victim of the Republican militias during the Spanish Civil War, Giménez Malla was beatified on 4 May 1997, now his feast day. He is the patron of Romani people.

== Biography ==
Giménez Malla was born to Juan Jiménez and Josefa Malla, a Catholic Romani family, in either Benavent de Segriá, Lleida or in Alcolea de Cinca, Spain. Sources differ as to whether the year was 1861 or 1865. He was baptized in Fraga, Huesca Province. His father was a cattle-trader. The family usually waited out the winter on farms in places farmers set aside for them, or else they rented a cottage for a few months. Ceferino often went hungry. Accompanying his father, he became conversant in Catalan as well as Romany. Around 1880 his father abandoned the family and they went to Barbastro, where his uncle taught Ceferino to weave wicker baskets. About the age of twenty, he wed Teresa Jiménez Castro according to a traditional Roma ceremony. They were happily married for forty years. They had no children, but looked after his younger brothers and sisters. Around 1909 they adopted Teresa's orphaned niece, Pepita. In 1912, Giménez Malla and his wife Teresa solemnized their marriage in a Catholic ceremony, and bought a house in the Huescan town of Barbastro. Teresa died in 1922.

Known for his honesty, Ceferino became something of a leader in the Roma community of Barbastro and the surrounding area. People would seek him out for advice, and to mediate family quarrels. He also resolved disputes between Romani and Spanish people.

One day a local landowner, suffering from tuberculosis, passed out on the street. Heedless of the danger of contagion, Malla hoisted the man on his shoulders and carried him home. The grateful family rewarded him with a sum sufficient to start a business buying and selling surplus mules which the French army no longer needed after World War I. Tools with which he cleaned horseshoes and iron shoes for mules and donkeys were donated by the son of Ceferino's friend, Ferruchón, to the Museum of Martyrs in Barbastro. Ceferino is said to have often lent money to poor Roma, and to have also allowed them to remove from the stables the animals they liked most. They could pay their debts when they sold them or at the end of their seasonal work when they could afford to do so. He reportedly also used to feed poor children.

Giménez Malla is a described as a pleasant, good-natured, tall, thin man carefully dressed and distinguished looking. Although illiterate, after his wife died, Giménez Malla began a career as a catechist under the guidance of a priest-teacher, Don Nicholas Santos de Otto, teaching both Romani and Spanish children. He had a gift for catechizing children by telling them stories. He became a member of the Secular Franciscan Order, the Society of St. Vincent de Paul and, participated in Thursday night Eucharistic Adoration.

In July 1936, during the Spanish Civil War, Giménez Malla tried to defend a Catholic priest from Republican militiamen. They both were arrested and imprisoned in a former Capuchin monastery, converted into a wartime prison. An acquaintance advised him that he would probably be released if he gave up his rosary, but he refused. A Romani legend has it that the soldiers asked him if he had weapons, and that he answered: "Yes, and here it is", while displaying his rosary. On August 9, Giménez Malla and others were taken by truck to a cemetery and shot. He reportedly died holding the rosary in his hands, and shouting: "Long live Christ the King!". He was buried in a mass grave; his body has never been found.

== Veneration ==
On 4 May 1997, Ceferino Giménez Malla was beatified by Pope John Paul II who said that Malla "knew how to sow harmony and solidarity among his own, also mediating conflicts that sometimes blur the relationship between non-Roma and Roma, showing Christ's love knows no boundaries of race or culture."

Approximately 3,000 Roma attended the beatification ceremony in Rome, some travelling from as far away as Slovakia and Brazil. He is the first Roma beatified.
