= Montóia =

Montóia is a Portuguese surname. Notable people with the surname include:

- Guilherme Montóia (born 2003), Portuguese footballer
- Vavá Pequeno (born 1994), full name Edley Dos Anjos Pereira Montoia, Santomean footballer

== See also ==
- Montoya, Basque and Spanish surname
