= Las Hermanas Montoya =

- Origin: San Jose, California, USA
- Genres: Latin, Mambo
- Years active: 1948–1969
- Label: RCA Victor

The Montoya Sisters, AKA Las Hermanas Montoya, were a Latin music singing group consisting of four sisters; Mercedes, Ofelia, Emilia, and Esther.

== History ==
The sisters were born to immigrant parents who moved to the United States in 1928. Mercedes was born in Mexico, and the remaining siblings were all born in California. Their parents, Salvador, a railroad worker, and mother, Concepción eventually moved the family of ten to San Jose, California. The girls formed their own local singing group in the area, and with the advent of radio, began performing on live shows, opening many local new radio stations. At one of these live sessions, an executive from the Bacardi Radio Hour, a popular radio show in Mexico City, heard their voices and immediately asked them to perform on the show.

== Career ==
The four sisters arrived in Mexico City in 1948 and performed as a quartet and enjoyed steady work on a weekly live radio show on station XEW and were under contract as the featured act at "El Patio", which at the time was the number one nightclub in Mexico City, Mercedes eventually returned to the United States to marry. In 1950 the sisters were approached by the "Mambo King" Pérez Prado to go on a world tour that included Japan, Europe, and South America, and signed on as RCA Victor recording artists that same year. The group went on to work with some of the era's biggest Latin music performers and toured with names such as Celia Cruz, Billy Eckstine, and Nat King Cole. The fifties produced a number of sister acts in the United States such as the Lennon Sisters, the Andrews Sisters, and the McGuire Sisters. The Montoya Sisters seemed to fill the Latin music niche for a sister act. From 1950 to 1957 the girls were busy performing, recording as RCA Victor artists, and had parts in two movies. They also did command performances for several world leaders such as Prince Rainier of Monaco and King Farouk of Egypt. Through their recording career, they released many songs with many Latin band leaders such as Luis Arcaráz, Rafael de Paz, Lucho Bermúdez, and Chucho Navarro. The Sisters hit gold with their million-selling single "Mucho Mucho Mucho". In 1957 Emilia (Emily) left the group to marry. Esther and Ofelia continued the group as a duet until 1969.

== Members ==
=== Mercedes Montoya Carlos ===
Born: September 24, 1926
Years Active: 1948–1950
Died: July 6, 2014

=== Ofelia Montoya Vazquez ===
Born: November 20, 1927
Years Active: 1948–1969
Died: October 11, 1993

=== Emilia Montoya Sanchez ===
Born: May 2, 1929
Years Active: 1948–1957
Died: August 21, 2008

=== Esther Montoya ===
Born: September 8, 1930
Years Active: 1948–1969
Died: January 13, 2017

== Hit records ==
- Mucho Mucho Mucho; RCA/Victor with Pérez Prado Orchestra
- Penita Contigo; RCA/Victor with Pérez Prado Orchestra
- Cha Cha Cha Chavela; RCA/Victor with Rafael de Paz
- Que Siga La Pachanga; RCA/Victor Rafael de Paz

== Discography ==
- Las Hermanas Montoya, Con las Orquestras RCA
- Hermanas Montoya, Que Siga La Pachanga OTRA
- Hermanas Montoya, El Trio ideal de la Cancion Moderna RCA/Victor

== Filmography ==
- Viajera (1952) with Fernando Fernández and Rosa Carmina
- Alice in Wonderland (1951) (Spanish version) Voices of Singing Flowers
