= Andrés Carretero Pérez =

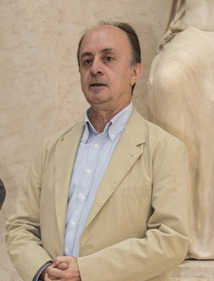
- Born: 1955 (age 70–71); Madrid Spain
- Occupation: Director
- Employer: Museo Arqueológico Nacional de España

Andrés Carretero Pérez (Spanish: Andrés Carretero Pérez, born 1955, Madrid), Spanish historian, Doctor in Geography and History. Since 2010 he is heading the National Archaeological Museum of Spain.

== Biography ==
Carretero Pérez graduated from Complutense University of Madrid. He has been director/deputy director of numerous museums in Spain. 1984-2001 he was the deputy director of the Spanish Village Museum, 1991-1994 he headed the State Museums under the Ministry of culture, 1994-2002 he was appointed as Deputy director of the Museo Nacional de Antropología, 2004-2008 director of Museo del Traje. Since 2010 he is the director of the National Archaeological Museum of Spain.

== Works ==
- Alfarería popular de Tajueco amb Matilde Fernández Montes i María Dolores Albertos Solera. Ministerio de Cultura, 1981. ISBN 84-7483-184-9
- Estudio etnográfico de la alfarería conquense María Dolores Albertos Solera, Matilde Fernández Montes i Aurelio Lorente.Cuenca : Excelentísima Diputación Provincial, D.L. 1978. ISBN 84-500-2916-3

== Articles ==
- Renovarse y mantener las esencias: el nuevo Museo Arqueológico Nacional amb Carmen Marcos Alonso. Boletín del Museo Arqueológico Nacional, ISSN 0212-5544, Nº 32, 2014
- El nuevo Museo Arqueológico Nacional, a la búsqueda de nuevos públicos.Museos.es: Revista de la Subdirección General de Museos Estatales, ISSN 1698-1065, Nº. 9-10, 2013-2014
- El Museo del Traje: breve presentación. Indumenta: Revista del Museo del Traje, ISSN 1888-4555, Nº. 0, 2007
- El Museo del Traje: Centro de Investigación del Patrimonio Etnológico. RdM. Revista de Museología: Publicación científica al servicio de la comunidad museológica, ISSN 1134-0576, Nº. 29, 2004
- Colecciones a raudales. Anales del Museo Nacional de Antropología, ISSN 1135-1853, Nº 9, 2002
- Domus y la gestión de las colecciones museísticas. Marq, arqueología y museos, ISSN 1885-3145, Nº. 0, 2005 (Ejemplar dedicado a: Museos, arqueología y nuevas tecnologías)
- Anales del Museo del Pueblo Español y Anales del Museo Nacional de Antropología. Aproximación bibliométrica. Revista de dialectología y tradiciones populares, ISSN 0034-7981, Tomo 57, Cuaderno 1, 2002
- El Proyecto de Normalización: Documental de Museos: reflexiones y perspectivas. PH: Boletín del Instituto Andaluz del Patrimonio Histórico, ISSN 1136-1867, Año nº 9, Nº 34, 2001
- La Museología, ¿una práctica o una disciplina científica?.Museo: Revista de la Asociación Profesional de Museólogos de España, ISSN 1136-601X, Nº. 1, 1996 (Ejemplar dedicado a: Formación y selección de profesionales de museos)
- Técnicas alfareras andaluzas amb Matilde Fernández Montes i Carmen Ortiz García. Revista de dialectología y tradiciones populares, ISSN 0034-7981, Cuaderno 42, 1987
