= Nilo Carretero =

Argentine footballer (born 1986)

Personal information
- Full name: Sebastián Nilo Carretero
- Date of birth: 27 February 1986 (age 40)
- Place of birth: Trenque Lauquen, Argentina
- Height: 1.75 m (5 ft 9 in)
- Position: Forward

Team information
- Current team: Universidad de Chile (assistant)

Senior career*
Years	Team	Apps	(Gls)
2005	Atlético Trenque Lauquen		
2006	Barrio Alegre		
2006–2007	Sarmiento de Junín	32	(11)
2007–2013	Banfield	3	(0)
2009	→ Quilmes (loan)	12	(2)
2009	→ Aldosivi (loan)	12	(0)
2010	→ Tiro Federal (loan)	17	(1)
2010–2011	→ Gimnasia de Jujuy (loan)	29	(2)
2011	→ Deportivo Quito (loan)	15	(0)
2012	→ Unión La Calera (loan)	7	(0)
2012–2013	→ Sarmiento de Junín (loan)	0	(0)

Managerial career
- 2016: Sarmiento de Junín (assistant)
- 2019–2020: Rosario Central (assistant)
- 2021–2023: Magallanes (assistant)
- 2023–2024: Universidad Católica (assistant)
- 2024–: Universidad de Chile (assistant)
- * Club domestic league appearances and goals

Sebastián Nilo Carretero (born 27 February 1986) is an Argentine former professional footballer who played as a midfielder or forward. He is a current assistant coach of Gustavo Álvarez in Universidad de Chile.

== Coaching career ==
As a football coach, Carretero has worked in his homeland and Chile. In Chile, he served as assistant coach of Nicolás Núñez in both Magallanes and Universidad Católica before joining the technical staff of Gustavo Álvarez in Universidad de Chile.

== Honours ==
Deportivo Quito

- Ecuadorian Primera División: 2011
