= Rubén Montoya =

Argentine footballer

Personal information
- Date of birth: 18 June 1940 (age 86)
- Place of birth: Buenos Aires, Argentina
- Position: Goalkeeper

Senior career*
| Years | Team | Apps | (Gls) |
| 1969–1970 | América de Quito | | |
| 1970–1974 | Barcelona | | |
| 1973 | Miami Toros | 19 | (0) |
| 1974 | Toronto Italia | | |
| 1974–1975 | Pumas UNAM | | |
- * Club domestic league appearances and goals

Rubén Montoya (born 18 June 1940) is an Argentine former footballer who played as a goalkeeper.

== Career ==
Montoya played in the Campeonato Ecuatoriano de Fútbol in 1969 with América de Quito. In his debut season with America he was named the Ecuador Player of the Year. In 1970, he played with Barcelona S.C., and featured in the 1972 Copa Libertadores. In the summer of 1973 he played in the North American Soccer League with Miami Toros. In his debut season with Miami he played in 19 matches.

In 1974, he played in the National Soccer League with Toronto Italia. The following season he played in the Mexican Primera División with Pumas UNAM. During his tenure with Pumas he assisted in securing the Copa México, and the Campeón de Campeones.

== Personal life ==
Montoya also served as an ordained Baptist minister.
