= Paul Monje House =

Historic house in Missouri, United States

- U.S. National Register of Historic Places
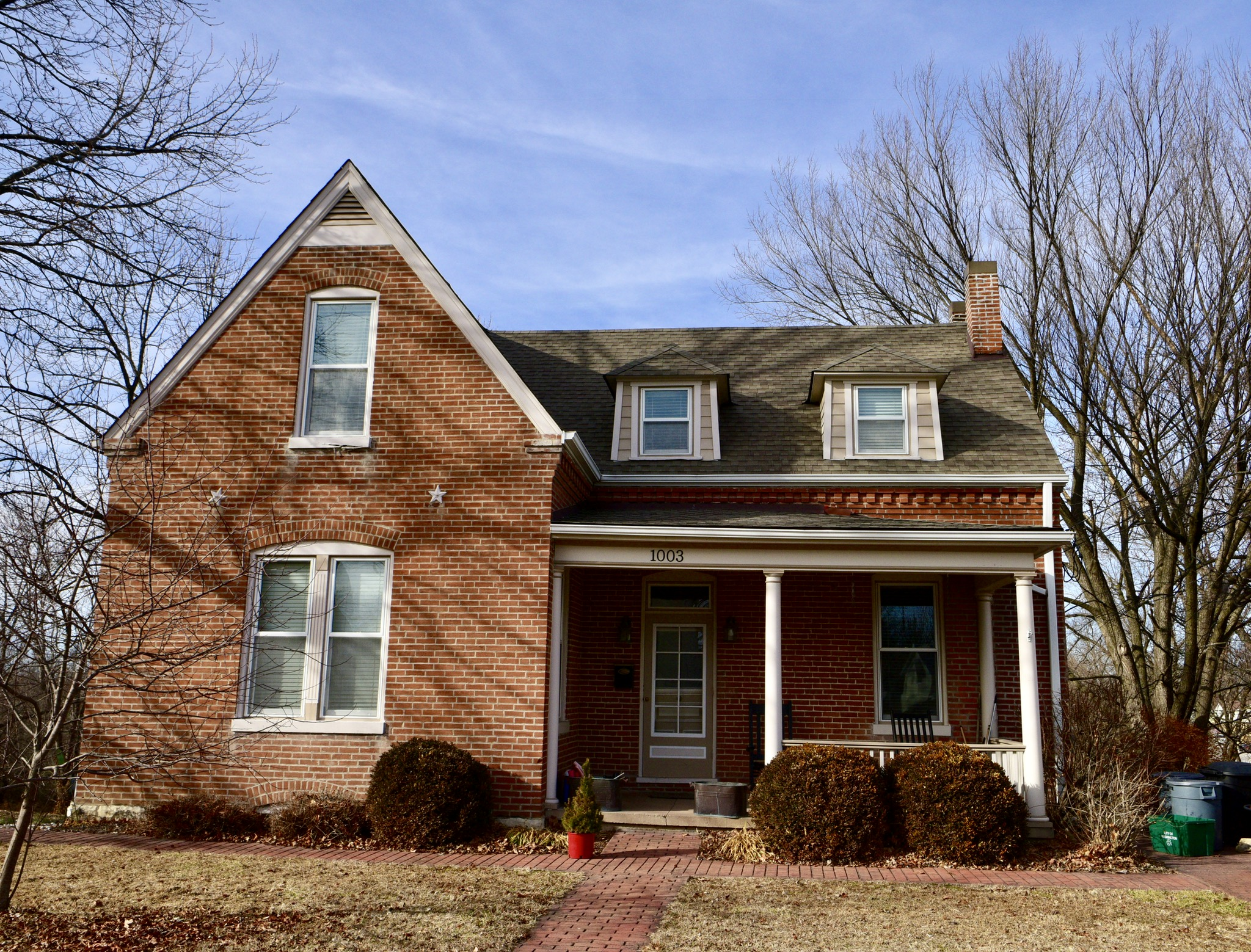

- Location within Missouri Location within the United States
- Location: 1003 W. 5th St. Washington, Missouri
- Coordinates: 38°33′24″N 91°1′31″W
- Area: less than one acre
- Built: 1908
- Architectural style: Gabled Ell
- MPS: Washington, Missouri MPS
- NRHP reference No.: 00001109
- Added to NRHP: September 14, 2000

Paul Monje House is a historic home located at Washington, Franklin County, Missouri. It was built about 1908, and is a 1 1/2-story, brick dwelling with a side ell on a stone foundation. It has a gable roof and segmental arched door and window openings. A front porch which extends the width of the side ell.

It was listed on the National Register of Historic Places in 2000.
