= Great Gypsy Round-up =

1749–1767 ethnic cleansing in Spain

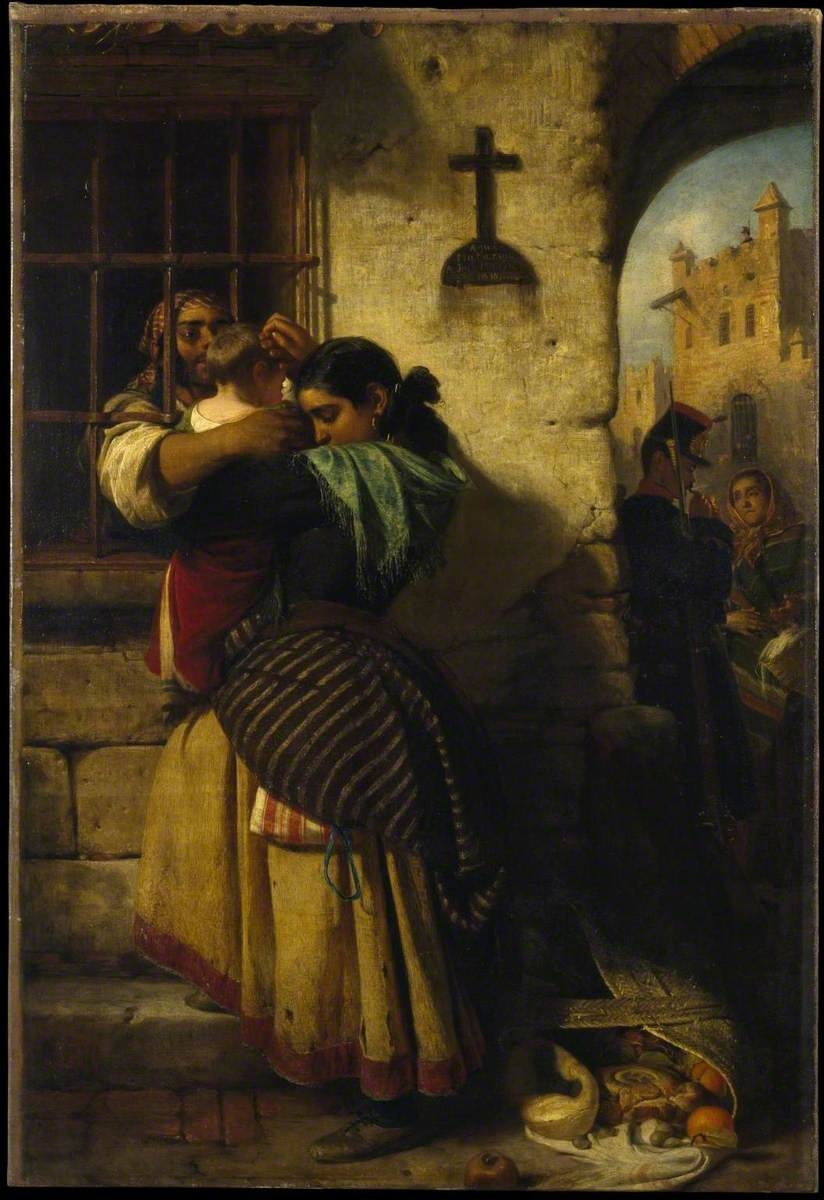
- The Prison Window by John Phillip depicting a Romani family in Spain during the Great Gypsy Round-up.
- Location: Spain
- Date: 1749–1763
- Target: Romani people in Spain (Gitanos)
- Attack type: Genocide, ethnic cleansing, concentration camps, forced displacement
- Deaths: Over 500
- Victims: 9,000–12,000 people forcibly imprisoned, enslaved, families separated
- Perpetrators: Spanish Monarchy (Ferdinand VI of Spain and Marquis of Ensenada)
- Motive: Antiziganism, Racism

The Great Gypsy Round-up (Spanish: Gran Redada de Gitanos), also known as the general imprisonment of the Gypsies (prisión general de gitanos), was a raid authorized and organized by the Spanish Monarchy that led to the arrest of most Roma in the region and the genocide of 9,000–12,000 Romani people. Although a majority were released after a few months, many others spent several years imprisoned and subject to forced labor. The raid was approved by the King Ferdinand VI of Spain, and organized by the Marquis of Ensenada, and set in motion simultaneously across Spain on 30 July 1749.

Since a royal edict by Charles II in 1695, Spanish Romani had been restricted to certain towns. An official edict in 1717 restricted them to only 75 towns and districts, so that they would not be concentrated in any one region.

== Organization ==
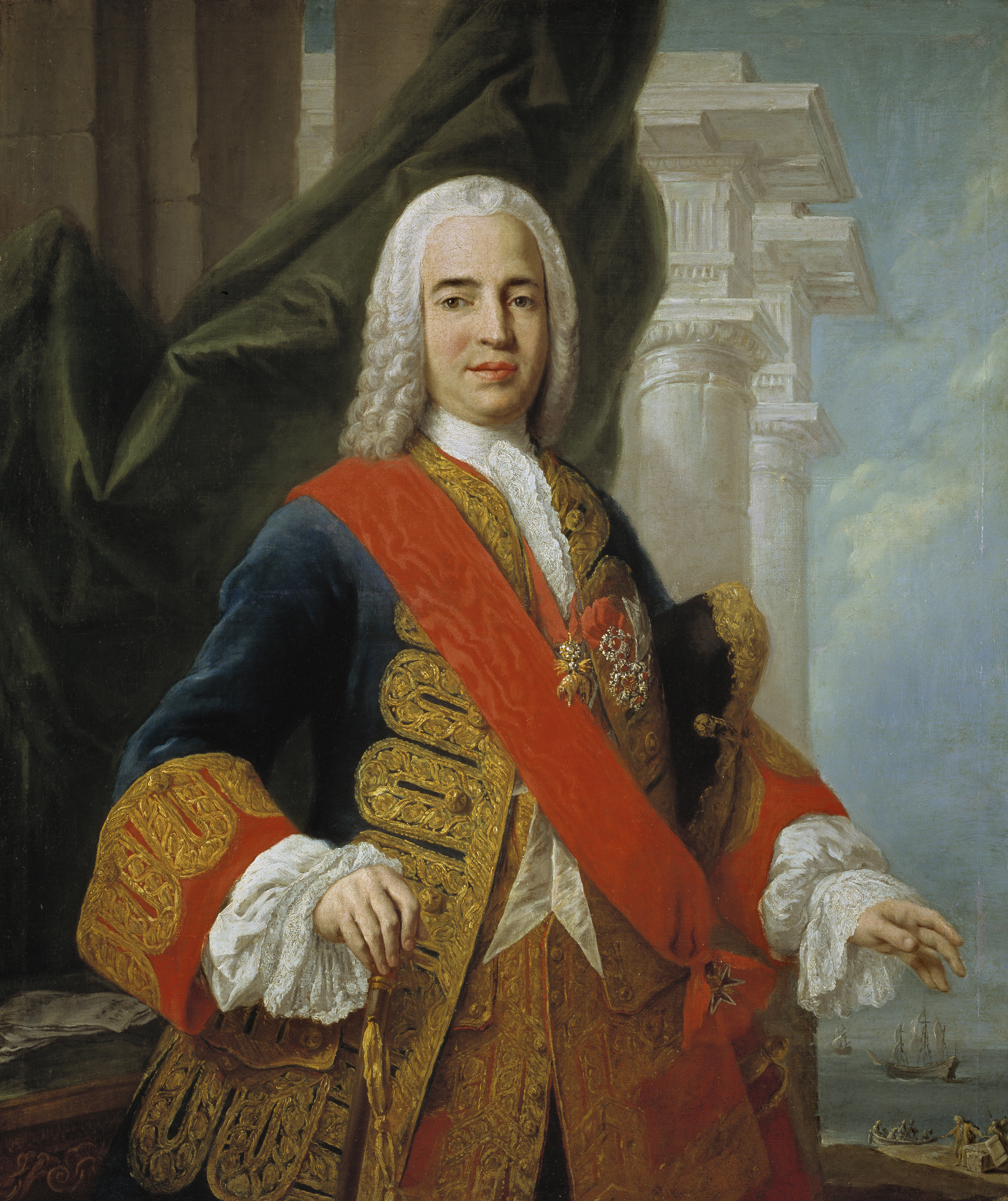
Marquis de la Ensenada, Royal Minister who organized the roundup.

The plans for the roundup were developed in secrecy. The Marquis of Ensenada developed a plan to arrest the Romani population of Spain and expel them to the colonies in the Americas. He foresaw the obstacle of asylum being sought in churches under the law of sanctuary, so with the aid of Cardinal Valenti, the papal nuncio to Spain, they were able to get pope Benedict XIV to grant orders of extraction from sanctuary under certain conditions in April 1748. After this the Council of Castille agreed to the Marquis of Ensenada's plan. The appointed Governor of the Council of Castile, Gaspar Vázquez Tablada, Bishop of Oviedo, secured the endorsement of Ferdinand VI It was later also supported by the opinion of the Jesuit Father Francisco Rávago, confessor to Ferdinand VI, whose reply about the morality of the roundup can be summarised in his commentary that:

The means proposed by the governor of the council to root out this bad race, which is hateful to God and pernicious to man, seem good to me. The king will be making a great gift to God, Our Lord, if he manages to get rid of these people.

While the original plan was to expel the Romani population to the Americas, after the failure of the neighboring Kingdom of Portugal in its project to expel its Romani population became known, the Spanish plan was changed to internal deportation and imprisonment. The plan entailed sending troops to the towns with Romani settlements, each carrying sealed set of instructions, which were only to be revealed to the commanders on a date just prior to the roundup in August. The Romani settlements were to be surrounded, and all able-bodied adult Romani males were internally deported to forced labor in the Naval arsenals or to specified mines, prisons, or factories. The women and children were forced into clothing manufacture. Those too ill to travel would remain in military custody until well enough to travel, or until they reached a "Christian death". The operation was to be funded by confiscated goods and homes of the Romani.

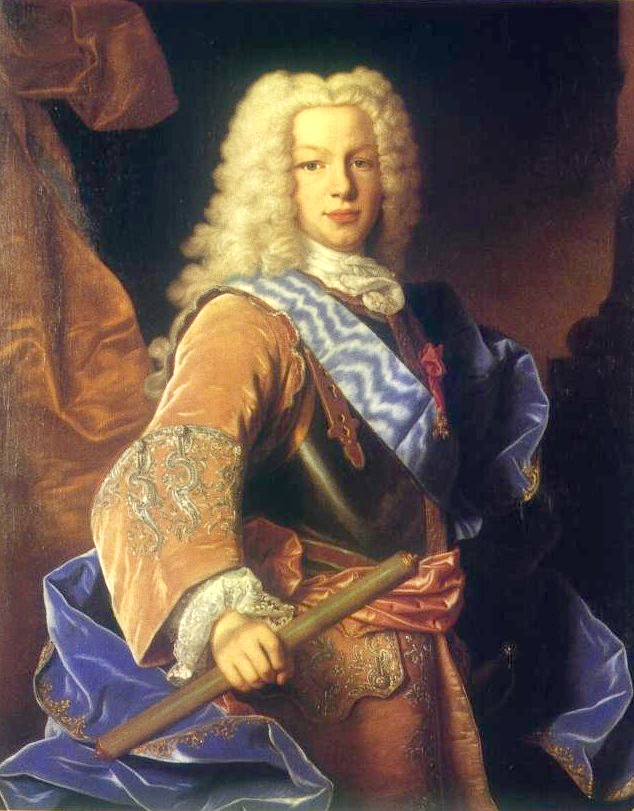
Fernando VI, who approved the Great Roundup.

The mechanics of the raid varied in efficiency from town to town. The roundup in Seville, where the city gates were closed by the encircling army to prevent the target's escape, created alarm in the general public, who were ignorant of the goals. The definition of who exactly was a Romani proved to be difficult in many cases and was prone to abuse. For example, Roma married to non-Romani were often spared. Nomadic Romani, already less frequent, proved difficult to the roundup. Ultimately, nearly 9,000 Romani were detained, 5,000 of which were released three months later due to pleas, protests from neighbors and local authorities. The remaining 4,000, who did not benefit from community support, were gradually from 1750 onwards over an eight year plight during which it is estimated around 500 died due to various causes.

== Reversal ==
The immediate outrage and protests caused by the imprisonment of those Romani who were well integrated in their community led to the release of a majority of those imprisoned three months following the round-up. The remaining 4,000 were released gradually from 1750 onwards. By 1763, the hundred remaining prisoners were pardoned and released by royal decree.

== Case of genocide ==
The historian Antonio Domínguez Ortiz stated in 1976 that "Ensenada planned a real genocide." This is later reiterated by historian José Luis Gómez Urdáñez who considers the round-up a genocidal project, while sociologist Manuel Ángel Río Ruiz considers it a project of "dissolution and cultural extermination".

Nicolás Jiménez González argues, "It should be highlighted that the 1749 Great Round-Up is the oldest-known attempted genocide against the Roma people carried out in the Spanish territories. To understand this better, a note of clarification is necessary. The term "genocide" did not yet exist in the language of the time; in official documents, the term "extermination" was used. However, the authorities did not intend to immediately "exterminate" the Roma population in prisons. Instead, they wanted the destruction of Roma people to be the consequence of imprisoning men and women separately, making it impossible for a new generation of Roma to be conceived. Therefore, from today's perspective, the General Imprisonment complies with the contemporary definition of the term 'genocide'."
