= Triana, Seville =

Administrative district in Seville, Spain

Coordinates: 37°23′00.89″N 6°00′18.72″W

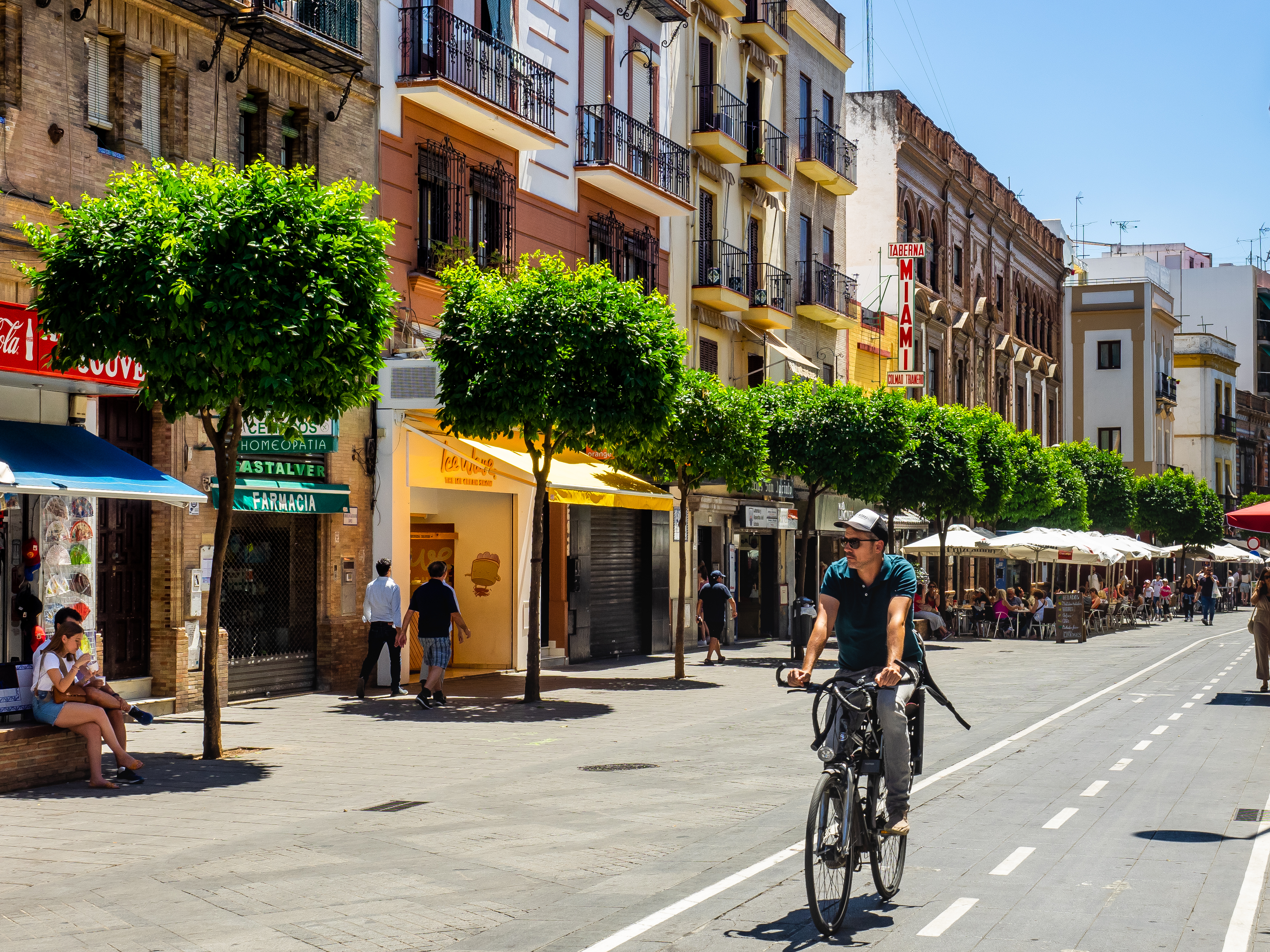
Calle San Jacinto in Triana

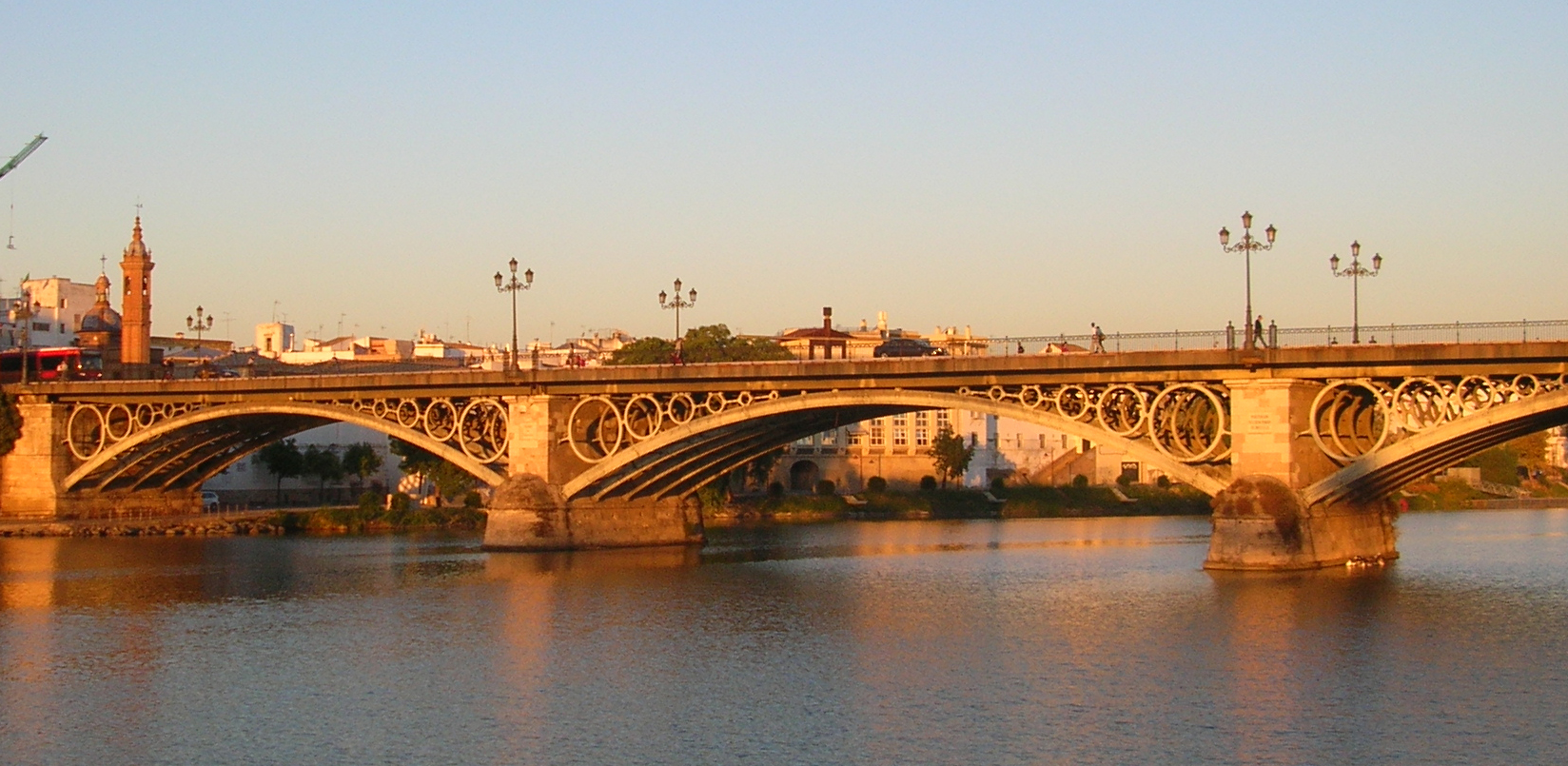
The Puente de Triana (Triana Bridge)

Triana is a neighbourhood and administrative district on the west bank of the Guadalquivir River in the city of Seville, Spain. Like other neighbourhoods that were historically separated from the main city, it was known as an arrabal. Triana is located on a peninsula between two branches of the Guadalquivir, narrowly linked to the mainland in the north. Two other districts are also usually included in this area, Los Remedios to the south and La Cartuja to the north.

Residents of Triana have traditionally been called trianeros; they identify strongly with the neighbourhood and consider it different in character from the rest of Seville. Triana has a traditional pottery and tile industry, a vibrant flamenco culture, and its own festivals; it has played an important role in the development of Sevillan culture and tradition.

== Etymology ==
Legend holds that Triana was founded as a Roman colony by the emperor Trajan, who was born in the nearby city of Italica; the name "Triana" supposedly derived from the original denomination of Trajana. Another theory claims that the name may be derived from the combination of the Latin tri, meaning "three", and the Celtiberian ana, meaning "river", since the Guadalquivir river split into three branches nearby. An additional hypothesis suggests that the derivation of "Triana" is from the Latin expression Trans amnem, meaning "those beyond the river".

== History ==
The first settlements in the Triana area are dated from the Roman period. During Muslim rule the neighbourhood developed around a castle built in the 10th century. Triana was the last defence of Seville from the west before the city-walls. It was strategically important because of its position between Seville proper and both the coast and the Aljarafe region of grainfields, vineyards, and olive orchards. The construction of a pontoon bridge (puente de barcas, literally, boat-bridge) joining Triana and Seville in 1171 during the reign of Caliph Abu Yaqub Yusuf greatly facilitated the development of the neighbourhood. Because of Triana's strategic role in the defence of city, Ferdinand III of Castile destroyed the citadel (Castillo de Triana) and the bridge before taking Seville in 1248.

During Castile's rule, the castle of Triana became the first Christian church of the neighbourhood when it was made the seat of a fraternal society, the Order of Saint George, which changed its name to Castillo de San Jorge (Castle of Saint George). Later, in 1481, under the rule of the Catholic Monarchs, it was made the seat of the Spanish Inquisition until 1785. The current bridge, the Puente de Isabel II, a representative symbol of Triana, was built in 1854.

Since Triana is close to the Guadalquivir River, the neighbourhood was frequently devastated by flooding, as it had no levees to hold back the rising waters. During these periodic floods, the inhabitants had to take refuge at the Castillo de San Jorge and the Church of Santa Ana. The historically worst floods occurred in 1435, 1440, 1545, and 1554. The reconstruction of the Guadalquivir channel system during the second half of the 20th century finally eliminated this hazard.

Triana was traditionally populated by sailors and potters, construction workers and artisans, with many bull-fighters and Flamenco singers and dancers living in the neighbourhood as well. Triana was also home to a large population of Romani people, concentrated in the street called the Cava de los Gitanos (now the Pagés del Corro), but they were displaced during the redevelopment projects of the 1970s.

== Main streets, museums and landmarks ==
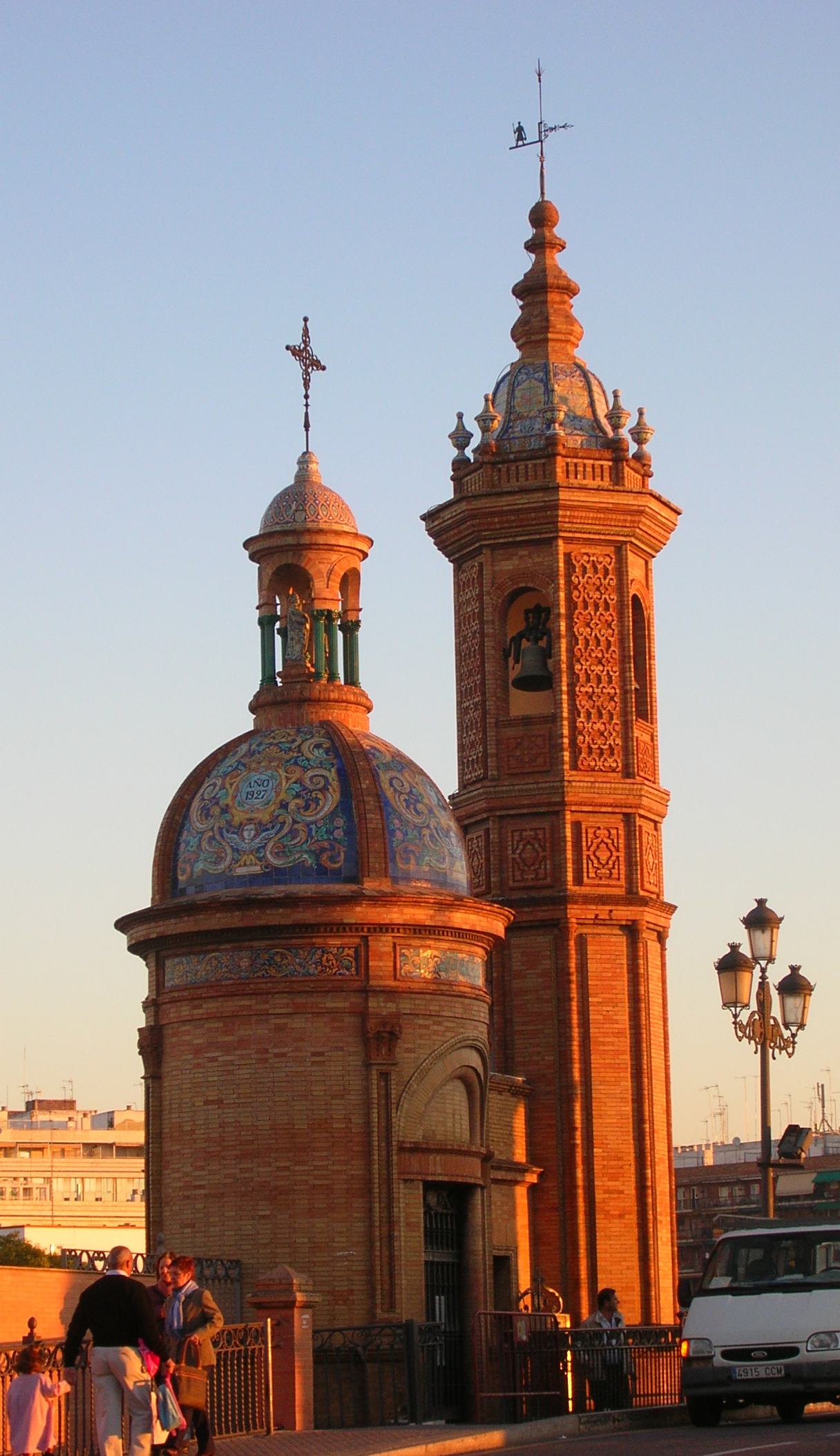
The Moorish Revival Chapel of El Carmen next to the Triana bridge

Triana is connected to Seville by the Isabel II bridge (popularly known as Puente de Triana) constructed between 1845 and 1852 by Gustavo Steinacher and Ferdinand Bennetot. It has on its west side a small Neo-Mudéjar chapel built by Aníbal González in 1927; both together constitute the most recognised symbol of the neighbourhood. They were declared a national monument in 1976 after a proposal to demolish them was defeated. The Triana market, built in 2005 in the Moorish Revival style, is located on the southern side of the bridge. The foundations of the Castillo de San Jorge may be seen in the basement of this building, which is now home to educational exhibits relating to the history of the Inquisition.

The traditional gateway to Triana from the bridge is the Altozano square, with its monuments to the renowned bullfighter Juan Belmonte and the flamenco arts, executed in modern style. It continues into San Jacinto street, a pedestrian commercial street that crosses the historical quarter from east to west, named after the monumental San Jacinto church, built in 1676 by Matías de Figueroa for the Dominican order.

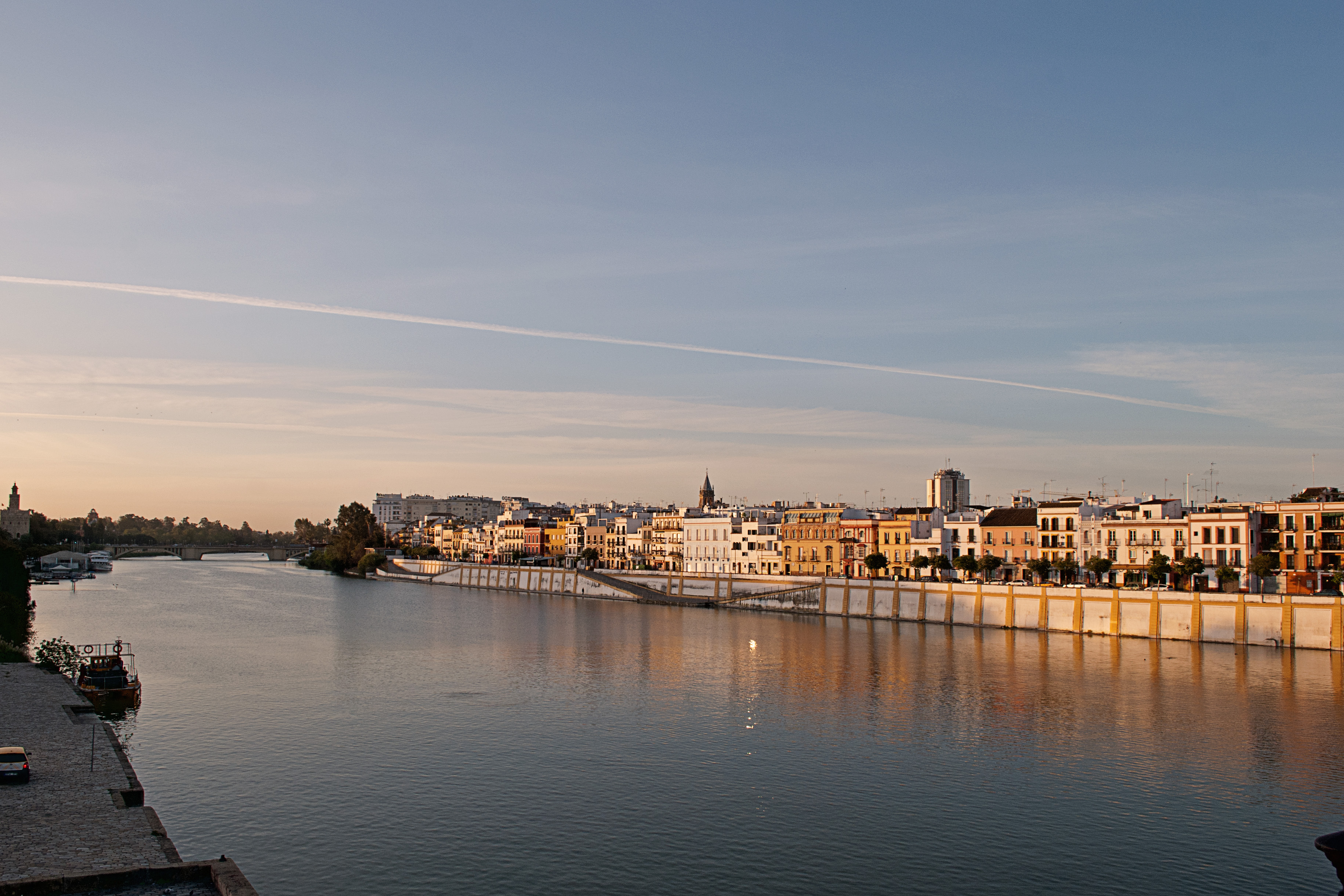
Betis street from the Guadalquivir river

San Jorge and Castilla streets are the main axes on the north side of the neighbourhood. Landmarks in this area include the Callejón de la Inquisición (Inquisition alley), a narrow street leading to the river; the Moorish Revival building of the old Fábrica de Cerámica Santa Ana (Santa Ana pottery factory), part of which has now been converted into the Centro Ceramica Santa Ana, the museum of pottery; the Baroque Parroquia de Nuestra Señora de La O (Parish Church of Our Lady of the O), built between 1697 and 1702, and the El Cachorro Basilica, seat of the Holy Week brotherhood with the same name.

To the south of Altozano square, Calle Pureza is the main street crossing the historical quarter. Here is found the Church of Santa Ana (Iglesia de Santa Ana), considered the Cathedral of Triana by popular sentiment. It was the first Catholic church built in Seville after Muslim rule ended in the city in 1248; its architecture combines early Gothic and Mudéjar styles. Constructed by order of Alfonso X, it contains an impressive altarpiece painted by Pedro de Campaña. Other notable buildings in this street are the Capilla de los Marineros (Sailors' Chapel), seat of the popular brotherhood known as La Esperanza de Triana (Our Lady of Hope of Triana), and the Casa de las Columnas (House of Columns), formerly occupied by the Universidad de Mareantes, an institution founded for the training of seamen bound for the Americas in the 16th and 17th centuries.

Calle Betis, the street which runs along the waterfront, offers a panoramic view of Seville proper, and has many of the city's most popular restaurants, bars and nightclubs.

Triana traditionally contained a large population of Romani people, who usually lived in corrales, or communal homes. A corral is a building organized around a patio with a central fountain, the occupants living in individual rooms that open to the communal patio. The stereotypical image of Triana as a haven for gypsies is no longer accurate, as most of the corrales have disappeared during the latter 20th century due to pressure by development interests. Those that currently persist are scattered through the neighbourhood and strictly protected as a cultural and ethnographic heritage. Among them are those located in Alfarería street, numbers 85 and 8-10 (dating from the 19th century and 1913-1914 respectively), in Castilla street at numbers 7 (1907–1910) and 88A (1918), and the house named Corral Herrera in Pagés del Corro Street (from 1909).

=== Museums ===
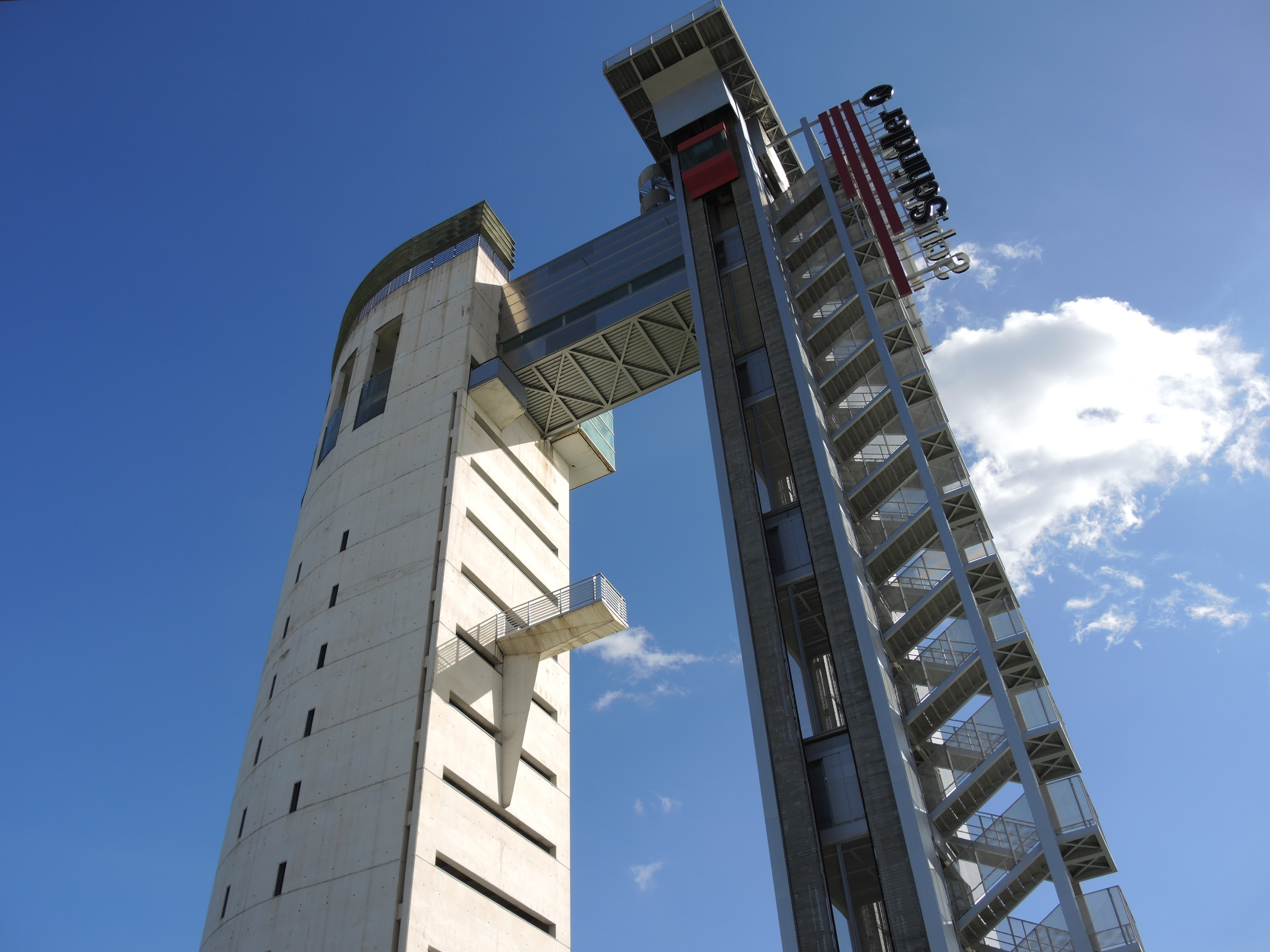
Tower at the Pavilion of Navigation

A museum devoted to the Spanish Inquisition (Centro Temático del Castillo de San Jorge) is located in the remains of the Castillo San Jorge that served as headquarters of the “Tribuno del Santo Oficio o de la Santa Inquisicion” from 1481 to 1785.

Other museums in the area include the Centro Cerámica Santa Ana (opened 2014), which includes a section on Triana and its people and traditions, The Centro Andaluz de Arte Contemporáneo (CAAC) in the former Monastery of Santa Maria de las Cuevas also known as the Monastery of the Cartuja and Pabellon de la Navegación (Pavilion of Navigation)

== Festivals ==
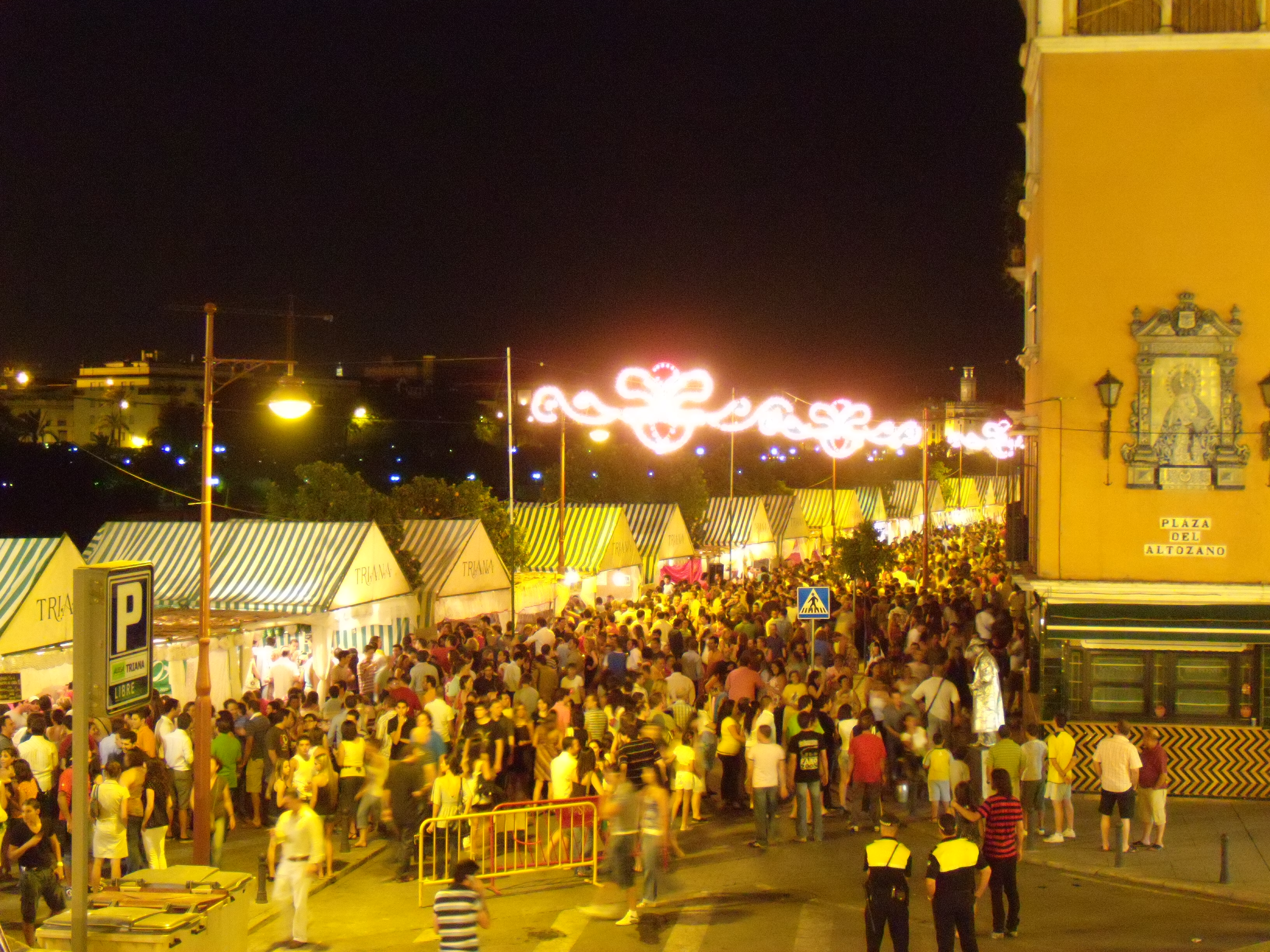
Betis street during the Velá Santana fair

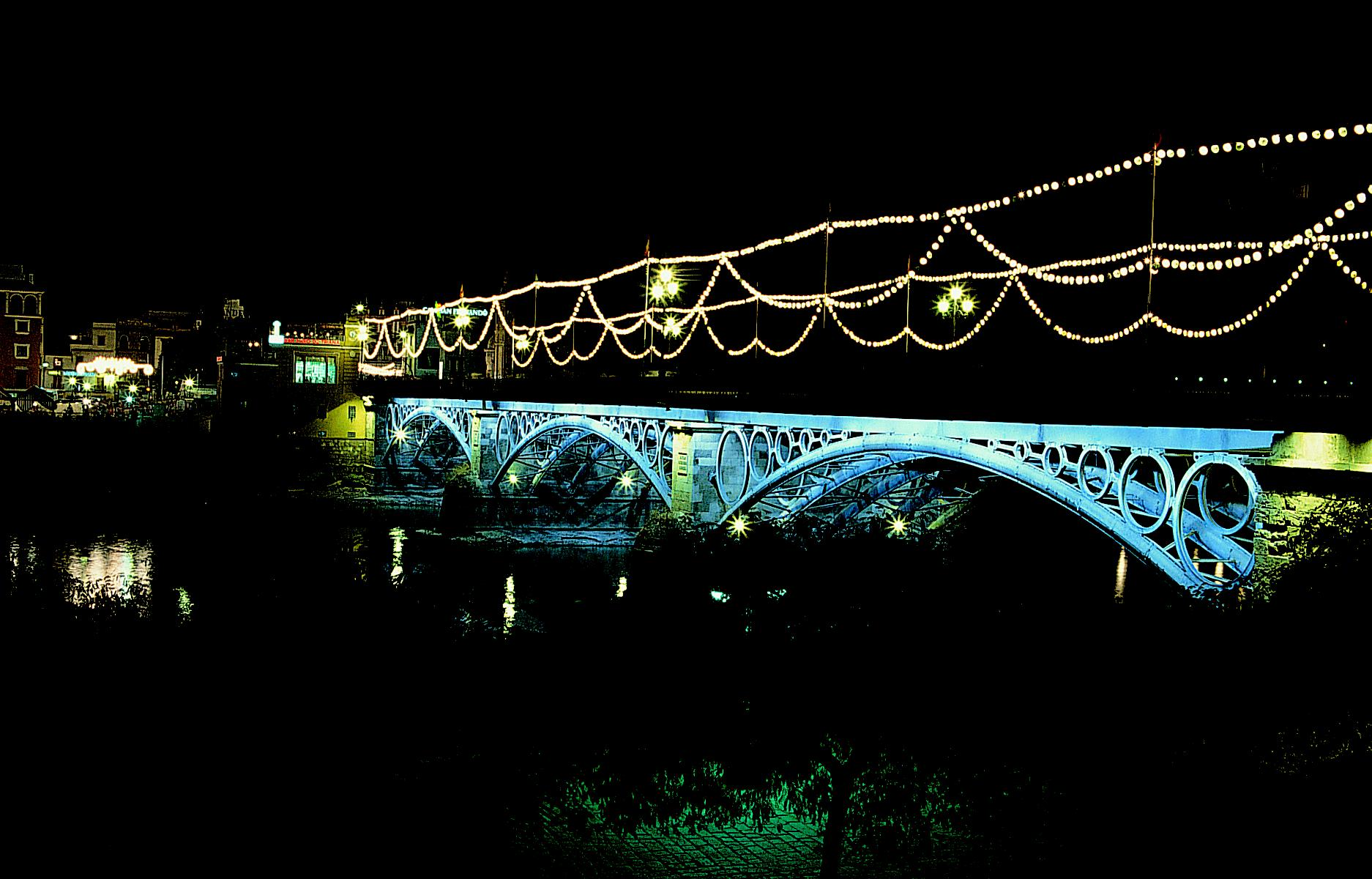
The Triana bridge during the Velá Santana fair

The Holy Week religious processions in Triana have a distinct character compared to those in downtown Seville. Two of the most popular are La Esperanza de Triana (Our Lady of Hope of Triana) and El Cachorro (literally, "The Puppy"). The latter reflects the popular name of a sculpture of the dying Christ. Tradition says the sculptor Francisco Antonio Ruiz Gijón, looking for a source of inspiration, saw the gypsy nicknamed Cachorro as he was dying after being stabbed. Ruiz Gijón made the sculpture so similar to him that people realized the similarity and started to call the Christ by the gypsy's nickname, El Cachorro.

Between 21 and 26 July, the Velá de Santa Ana (literally, "Saint Anne's evenings", because Saint Anne's day on the liturgical calendar is the 26 July) is celebrated on Betis Street. It is the city's second most important festival after the Feria de abril de Sevilla, although it is much older, dating from the 13th century. Here people drink sherry wine and dance the sevillanas, a type of folk dance; eating roasted sardines is also a popular activity. The cucaña is a popular competition during this celebration: people try to take a prize from the top of a greasy pole over the river.

=== Triana Flea Market ===
Near Isabel II Bridge is Triana Market, a busy flea market with food stalls and small restaurants that offer tapas, as well as handmade local crafts. The market stalls are open from Monday to Saturday from 9 am to 3 pm.

== Notable people ==
- Isabel Pantoja (born 1956) singer and actress
- María Jiménez (1950–2023), singer
- Pastora Filigrana (born 1981), Roma labour lawyer, trade unionist, feminist, columnist, and human rights activist

=== Bullfighters ===
- Juan Belmonte García (1892–1962; born elsewhere in Seville, but moved to Triana at 3)
- Manuel Jiménez Moreno "Chicuelo" (1902–1967)
- Antonio Montes Vico (1876–1907)
- Joaquín Rodríguez Ortega "Cagancho" (1903–1984)
- Francisco Vega de los Reyes "Gitanillo de Triana" (1904–1931)
