= Pilar Montoya =

- Born: Pilar Montoya Manzano; 1960; Seville, Spain
- Died: 6 March 2015 (aged 54); Seville, Spain
- Other names: La Faraona
- Occupation: Dancer
- Parents: Farruco (father); Enriqueta Reyes (mother)

Pilar Montoya Manzano (1960 – 6 March 2015), known as La Faraona, was a Spanish Romani flamenco dancer. A member of the Farrucos family, she was the eldest daughter of dancer Antonio "Farruco" Montoya Flores and singer Enriqueta Reyes, as well as the sister of Rosario "La Farruca" Montoya and the aunt of Juan Manuel "Farruquito" Fernández Montoya, Antonio El Farru, and El Carpeta.

== Biography ==
Pilar Montoya was born in Seville in 1960, the eldest daughter of dancer Antonio "Farruco" Montoya Flores and singer Enriqueta Reyes. She grew up in a family atmosphere where flamenco dancing and singing were deeply ingrained. In her dances, she was known for bulerías of great precision, and especially for tangos "with a touch of mischief and the canastero seal" in the family's style, to which she added her own stamp. At age 15 she began to accompany her father, Farruco, in all the shows that he mounted, including the Broadway tour of Flamenco Puro, along with Concha Vargas and other flamenco stars. "La Faraona", as Montoya became known, went on to appear in Andalucía Flamenca and Persecución as a soloist. She was also part of the film documentary about her family, Bodas de gloria, directed by Ricardo Pachón and Manuel Palacios.

In 2006, she co-starred with her sister Rosario in Gitanas at the Mont-de-Marsan Festival in France. She appeared in several shows with her nephew Farruquito, including Alma Vieja at her last Bienal de Flamenco of Seville in 2014. She also toured internationally with flamenco artists outside her family, such as El Güito and Manuela Carrasco.

In addition to performing, in her later years, Pilar Montoya taught courses and seminars on flamenco dancing at Seville's Flamencos por el Mundo academy.

She died in Seville on 6 March 2015 after a long illness, weeks after making her last public appearance on 24 February, presenting Mi Herencia with her sister Rosario, as part of the flamenco cycle Viene del Sur at Seville's Teatro Central. Her son Juan "El Barullo" Fernández has continued the family tradition, winning an award at the 2015 Festival del Cante de las Minas.

== Style ==
On the occasion of a tribute to Pilar Montoya by her nephew Farruquito, Europa Press described her style:

Like that of her illustrious progenitor, La Faraona's dance is short and straightforward, simple in its technical aspect but very precise, full of strength and confidence in its own transmission capacity. La Faraona was unique because, within the familiar aesthetic keys, she developed a style of strength but also whimsy, full of flavor and sense of humor, a facet that exploded mainly in tangos. She was, without doubt, the blackest, the most African of the Farruco family. The last image of La Faraona is her canastero style, her way of breaking into a barefoot scene and with a wicker basket on her arm, bouncing to the rhythm of tangos. Her unique hip movement will go down in the history of flamenco dance.
