= Anita Awosusi =

German Sinti writer and civil rights activist, born 1956

Anita Asosusi
- Born: 1956 (age 69–70)
- Occupations: writer, musician, documentary filmmaker and human rights activist
- Movement: Human rights activism for Romani people
- Board member of: Documentation and Cultural Centre of German Sinti and Romani
- Awards: Civis Media Prize for her documentary film about the deportation of Romani children during Nazi rule in Germany

Anita Awosusi (born 1956) is a German writer, musician, documentary filmmaker and human rights activist. Herself a Sinti woman, she has been active in campaigns for the rights of the Sinti and Romani people. Since the 1990s, she has published works on the history of the Romani Holocaust, on the music and on stereotyped representations of Sinti and Roma.

== Life and career ==
Awosusi was born a member of the Sinti ethnic group in 1956 and had to leave primary school after only five years. The Romani and Sinti in Germany are among the biggest and the most discriminated ethnic groups. Her parents were survivors of the genocide of Sinti and Romani people under the rule of National Socialism in Europe.

Since the mid-1980s, Awosusi has been campaigning for the rights of the Sinti and Romani. Among other activities, she was a board member of the Documentation and Cultural Centre of German Sinti and Romani in Heidelberg. As part of this activity, she worked as an outreach educator on the remembrance of the Romani Holocaust.

Awosusi authored and edited several publications about stereotyped representations of Sinti and Romani and the history of their persecution, both in language and in visual media such as photography. Further, she documented Romani music ranging from Hungarian Romani music to Sinti jazz and Flamenco in three volumes. As a musician, she created a show including music and poetry titled Rom Som – Ich bin ein Mensch – Lyrik und Lieder der Sinti und Romani (Rom Som - I am a Human Being) with the violinist Romeo Franz and other musicians. During these performances, Awosusi recited lamentations and lyrical texts about the persecution of Romani people during Nazi rule.

In 2016, Awosusi published her autobiography Vater unser. Eine Sintifamilie erzählt (Our Father. A Sinti family tale). In this work, she wrote about her family’s experience during the Romani Holocaust as well as how this stigmatisation has affected her own and her family's lives.

Awosusi's husband is the Nigerian-born engineer Hope Awosusi, who played as a jazz guitarist in the Awosusi Quintet, a jazz-funk-soul band from Karlsruhe; their daughter is the singer and activist Tayo Awosusi-Onutor.

== Awards ==
In 1996, Awosusi, writer Michail Krausnick and activist Romani Rose received the Civis Media Prize for their documentary film about the deportation of Sinti children to Auschwitz concentration camp titled Auf Wiedersehen im Himmel – Die Kinder von der St. Josefspflege.

== Selected publications ==
=== As author ===
- Anita Awosusi, Andreas Pflock: Sinti und Roma im KZ Natzweiler-Struthof – Anregungen für einen Gedenkstättenbesuch – Geschichte, Rundgang, Biografien, Informationen. Dokumentations- und Kulturzentrum. Deutsche Sinti und Roma, Heidelberg 2006, ISBN 978-3-929446-19-7.
- Anita Awosusi, Andreas Pflock: Den Opfern ein Gesicht geben – Historische Fotografien im Kontext der pädagogischen Arbeit des Dokumentations- und Kulturzentrums Deutscher Sinti und Roma, In: Silvio Peritore, Frank Reuter (eds.): InszenIerung des Fremden. Fotografische Darstellung von Sinti und Roma im Kontext der historischen Bildforschung, Heidelberg 2011, pp. 263–279, ISBN 978-3-929446-28-9
- Vater unser. Eine Sintifamilie erzählt. Heidelberg: Verlag Regionalkultur, 2016, ISBN 978-3-89735-969-7.

=== As editor ===
- Anita Awosusi (ed.): Die Musik der Sinti und Roma (= Schriftenreihe des Dokumentations- und Kulturzentrums Deutscher Sinti und Roma), Heidelberg 1996–1998, 3 volumes:
  - Band I: Die ungarische „Zigeunermusik“, ISBN 3-929446-07-3.
  - Band II: Der Sinti-Jazz, ISBN 3-929446-09-X.
  - Band III: Der Flamenco, ISBN 3-929446-10-3.
- Anita Awosusi (ed.): Stichwort: Zigeuner – Zur Stigmatisierung von Sinti und Roma in Lexika und Enzyklopädien. Wunderhorn, Heidelberg 1998, ISBN 3-88423-141-3.
- Anita Awosusi (ed.): Zigeunerbilder in der Kinder- und Jugendliteratur. Wunderhorn, Heidelberg 2000, ISBN 3-88423-177-4.

== See also ==
- History of the Romani people
- Romani society and culture
- Central Council of German Sinti and Roma
- European Civil Rights Prize of the Sinti and Roma

== Literature ==
- Rose, Romani (2001), "The Documentation and Cultural Centre of German Sinti and Roma", in Roth, John K.; Maxwell, Elisabeth; Levy, Margot; Whitworth, Wendy (eds.), Remembering for the Future, London: Palgrave Macmillan UK, pp. 2556–2565, doi:10.1007/978-1-349-66019-3_180, ISBN 978-0-333-80486-5
- Jost, Steffen (2014). "Sinti and Roma in German Concentration Camps: Old Problems and New Perspectives on a Neglected Field". New Research on Roma and the Holocaust.
- Tebbutt, Susan (2003). "Between Distance and Proximity: Film Images and After-images of the Genocide of the Romanies". Framework: The Journal of Cinema and Media. 44 (2): 72–80. ISSN 0306-7661.
