= Else Baker =

Sinti holocaust survivor (born 1935)

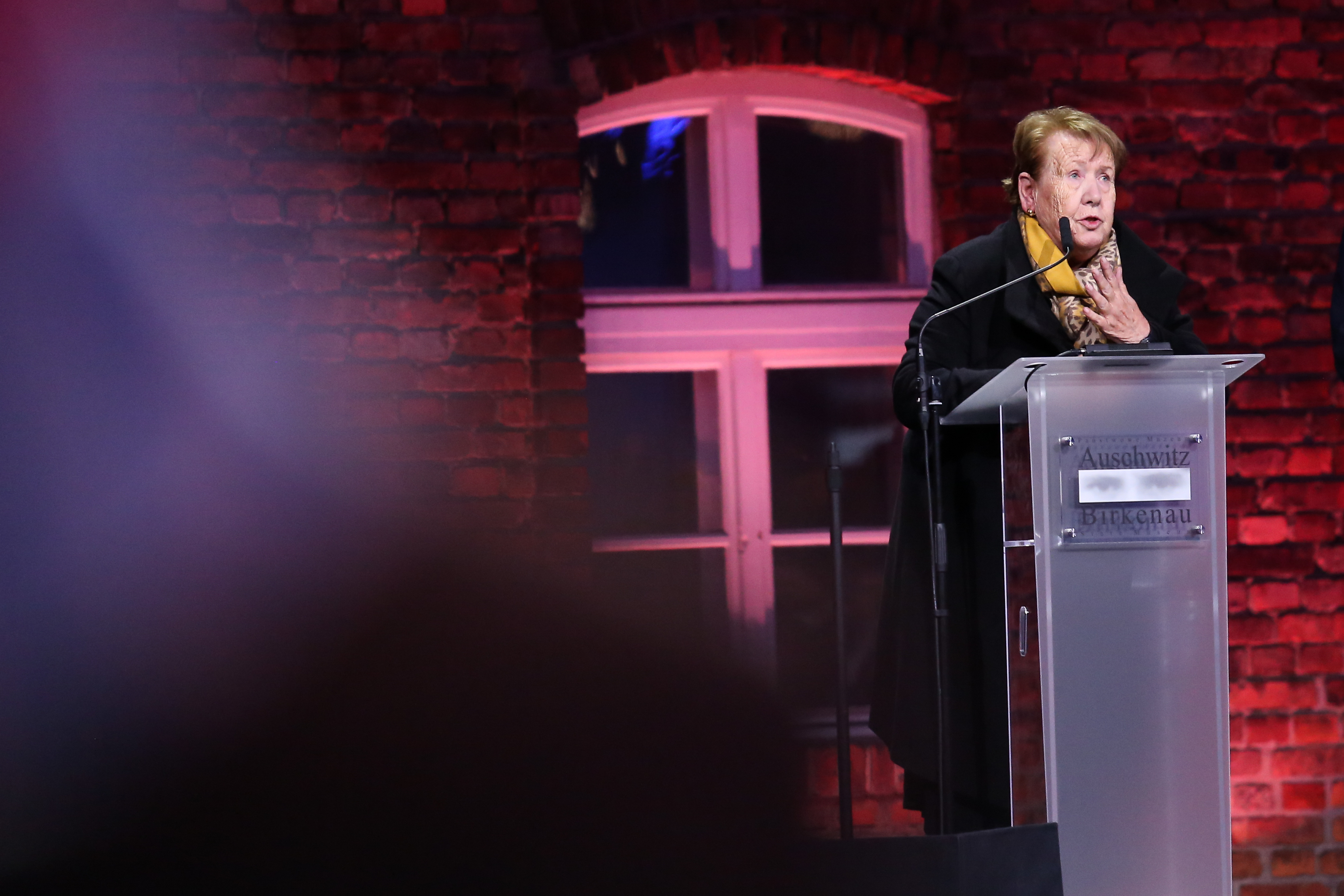
- Else Baker giving a speech at the 75th anniversary of the liberation of Auschwitz on 20 January 2020
- Born: Else Schmidt; December 18, 1935 (age 90); Hamburg, Germany
- Occupations: Holocaust survivor, author, public speaker
- Years active: 1994–present (as public speaker)
- Known for: Surviving Auschwitz concentration camp, Romani Holocaust testimony
- Spouse: Married 1965
- Parent(s): Adoptive parents: Auguste and Emil Matulat
- Relatives: Biological siblings: Rosemarie, Elisabeth, Uwe, Dieter (twins)
- Awards: Cross of Merit of the Order of Merit of the Federal Republic of Germany (2012)

Else Baker (born 18 December 1935) is a survivor of the Auschwitz II-Birkenau concentration camp.

== Life ==
Else Baker, née Else Schmidt, was adopted by Auguste and Emil Matulat at the age of one.

Nazi Party officials classified her biological mother as "half gypsy". For that reason, on 11 March 1943, aged seven, Else was picked up by the police and taken to a warehouse near the port of Hamburg. The warehouse was used as a collection point for Sinti and Romani people from Hamburg who were to be deported to the Auschwitz concentration camp. However, her foster father, Emil Matulat, was able to prevent her deportation by immediately intervening with the authorities.

The following year, Else was arrested again and taken back to the same warehouse. On 18 April 1944, she was deported to the Auschwitz concentration camp. She was accompanied by 26 others who were deported with her, including 21 children between the ages of one and 15. On 21 April 1944, Else's name was entered in the inmate register and her inmate identification number was tattooed on her left forearm, marking the eight-year-old as inmate "Z 10.540". Else was housed in the Auschwitz "Gypsy Family Camp", which consisted of primitive wooden barracks.

The SS liquidated the camp on 2 August 1944, murdering thousands. Else, however, was transported to the Ravensbrück concentration camp for women. By chance, shortly before her departure, she met four of her biological siblings in Auschwitz: her sisters Rosemarie and Elisabeth and brothers Uwe and Dieter, who were twins. While Elisabeth, Uwe, Dieter, and Else's biological mother were murdered in Auschwitz, Rosemarie was also sent to Ravensbrück. On 3 August 1944, Else was entered in Ravensbrück register of inmates as inmate number 48.114.

At considerable personal risk, her foster father continued to try to secure Else's release, writing petitions and letters to the Nazi authorities and leadership. His request was finally granted, and he was allowed to collect Else from Ravensbrück on 27 September 1944. Before she was allowed to leave the concentration camp, Else had to sign a non-disclosure agreement agreeing to maintain absolute silence about her experiences in the concentration camps.

In 1963, Else Schmidt left Germany and emigrated to the United Kingdom. She married in 1965 and took the surname Baker. In 1966, she had the tattoo of her inmate number removed. Else Baker now lives near London.

== Impact ==
From 1974 on, Else Baker increasingly engaged with her childhood experiences under the Nazi regime. In 1994, she spoke for the first time about her experiences in the concentration camps in an interview with the Documentation and Cultural Centre of German Sinti and Roma. Since then, she has been actively engaged in public as a contemporary witness of the Porajmos, or Romani Holocaust.

She was the first Sintesa to be received in audience by Queen Elizabeth II on Holocaust Memorial Day in 2005. She spoke publicly at commemorative events in Auschwitz in 2019 and 2020.

In 2007, Else Baker's life story was published under the title Elses Geschichte: Ein Mädchen überlebt Auschwitz as a children's book. In 2014, the English translation was published as Else's Story: The story of how a little girl survived Auschwitz. The Documentation and Cultural Centre of German Sinti and Roma maintains a German-language website which provides further background information and educational materials about the book.

== Honours ==
On 15 July 2012, Else Baker was awarded the Cross of Merit of the Order of Merit of the Federal Republic of Germany at the German embassy in London
