= Elisabeth Guttenberger =

German Holocaust survivor and human rights activist (1926–2024)

- Born: Elisabeth Schneck; 6 February 1926; Stuttgart, Germany
- Died: 25 March 2024 (aged 98)
- Occupation: Human rights activist

Elisabeth Guttenberger (née Schneck; 6 February 1926 – 25 March 2024) was a German Holocaust survivor and human rights activist. Of Sinti origin, she survived the Romani Holocaust and testified at the Frankfurt Auschwitz trials after having been interned at the Gypsy family camp.

== Biography ==
Born in Stuttgart on 6 February 1926, Guttenberger lived in her hometown until 1936. Her father, Josef Schneck, was a dealer of antique string instruments. Her mother, Sofie, valued a good education for her children, enrolling them in music lessons. She later stated that her education helped provide her opportunities for administrative offices within Auschwitz. Once Adolf Hitler took power, her family found it difficult to find economic opportunities due to the strict racial criteria. The family moved to Munich in 1936. She was unable to attend secondary school and was forced to abandon her apprenticeship in confectionery due to intervention from the Gestapo and was instead conscripted into working at a munitions factory.

On 16 December 1942, the Nazi regime decreed that all Romani still living within German territory must be deported to Auschwitz with the goal of complete extermination. Guttenberger's family was apprehended in Munich on 8 March 1943 and deported to Auschwitz eight days later, where she received the prisoner number Z 3991. The camp consisted of 32 stables with three-story bunks, with up to a thousand prisoners crammed into each stable. She was the only member of her family to survive internment, having learned of her father's death after her freedom. She was transferred to Ravensbrück on 1 August 1944 before being sent to Flossenbürg. The camp was closed on 15 April 1945 and the prisoners were sent on a death march to Marienbad. She was liberated by American troops in late April 1945.

After the war, Guttenberger was called to testify in the Frankfurt trials, which took place from 1963 to 1965. Although she was unable to attend the trial, her testimony was read by investigating judge Heinz Düx before the Pforzheim District Court. However, the court did not find her testimony conclusive. After the trials, she regularly testified at the commemoration of the Reichstag building in Berlin, notably on the 50th anniversary of the "Auschwitz decree" in 1992. She also spoke at the opening of the Documentation and Cultural Centre of German Sinti and Roma in 1997. On 2 August 2014, her testimony was read by Olga Grjasnowa at an event organized by the Memorial to the Murdered Jews of Europe, taking place at the Memorial to the Sinti and Roma Victims of National Socialism.

In March 2008, a Stolperstein bearing the names of Guttenberger's family members was placed outside their former home in Stuttgart. The organizing group was awarded the Alfred Hausser Prize by the Association of Persecutees of the Nazi Regime – Federation of Antifascists and she was present at the awards ceremony.

Elisabeth Guttenberger died on 25 March 2024, at the age of 98.

== Publications ==
- Adler, H. G.; Lingens, Ella; Langbein, Hermann, eds. (1962). Auschwitz: Zeugnisse und Berichte [Auschwitz: Testimonies and Reports] (in German). European Publishing Company. pp. 159–162.
- Gedenkbuch: Die Sinti und Roma Im Konzentrationslager Auschwitz-Birkenau, Allemand [Memorial Book: The Sinti and Roma in the Auschwitz-Birkenau Concentration Camp, Germany]. Auschwitz-Birkenau State Museum: Saur. 1993. ISBN 978-3-598-11162-4. OL 9066896M.
