= Romani people in Belgium =

Ethnic group

According to the Council of Europe, there are approximately 30,000 Romani people living in Belgium (0.29% of the national population). Most Romani Belgians reside in the regions of Flanders and Brussels.

Around 10,000 Roma are Belgian citizens and are described as Manouches/Sinti and Roms in Belgium. These three distinct Romani groups share a nomadic culture and lifestyle. The Manouches who are the Sinti of the country are descendants of the first Romani people to settle in Belgium during the 15th century. The Roms, represent the second major wave of Roma migration to Belgium from Romania after the abolition of slavery in Moldavia and Wallachia in 1856.

Romani people have historically been subject to discrimination and were persecuted during the Holocaust in Belgium. A rail convoy of Belgian Roma were deported to Auschwitz concentration camp on December 16, 1942.
