= Lily Franz =

Sinta writer (1924–2011)

Lily Franz (born Adele Franz; 1924–2011), married as Lily van Angeren, published as Lily van Angeren-Franz, was a Sinta writer. She was arrested with her family in 1943 and taken to Auschwitz concentration camp as part of the Romani Holocaust. Franz survived the camp, testifying against a SS officer. She lived in the Netherlands and published a memoir.

== Life ==
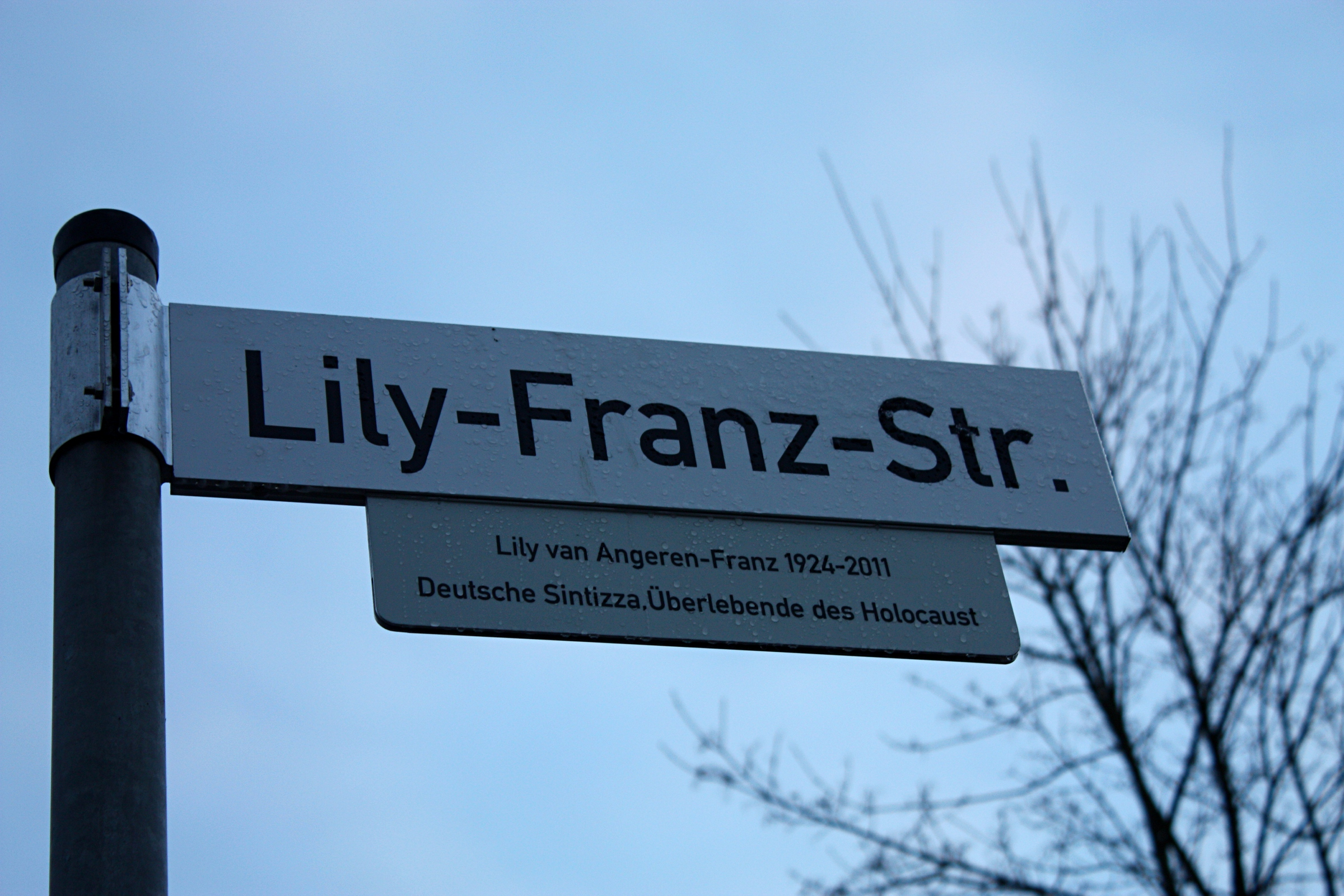
Lily-Franz-Straße in Hildesheim

Adele Franz was born in Neustädtel, Province of Upper Silesia, then in Germany, to Sinti parents on 24 January 1924. The family lived in a caravan and travelled for father Julius to find seasonal work. When he was arrested in 1938, the family stayed in Hildesheim. Franz and her sister Waltraud attended school then started working in a factory.

She was arrested on 1 March 1943 with her sister by the Kriminalpolizei and taken to Auschwitz concentration camp, where they were held in the Gypsy family camp as part of the Romani Holocaust. She was registered as Adele Franz, number Z-561. She worked as a clerk and was later moved to Ravensbrück concentration camp. After the war, Franz married and lived in Woerden in the Netherlands. She searched for her family and in 1952 was reunited with her father and sister. Between 1987 and 1991, Franz was a key witness in the trial of SS officer Ernst-August König, testifying on the names of the camp guards working in the Gypsy family camp. She visited Auschwitz several times with the Central Council of German Sinti and Roma.

Franz died on 7 March 2011, in Woerden. In 2014, Hildesheim council decided to rename a street to Lily-Franz-Straße.

== Selected works ==
- (2004) Lily van Angeren-Franz and Henny Clemens, "Polizeilich zwangsentführt": Das Leben der Sintizza Lily van Angeren-Franz ("Abducted by the police": The life of Sinta Lily van Angeren-Franz), edited by Hans Schmid
