= European Civil Rights Prize of the Sinti and Roma =

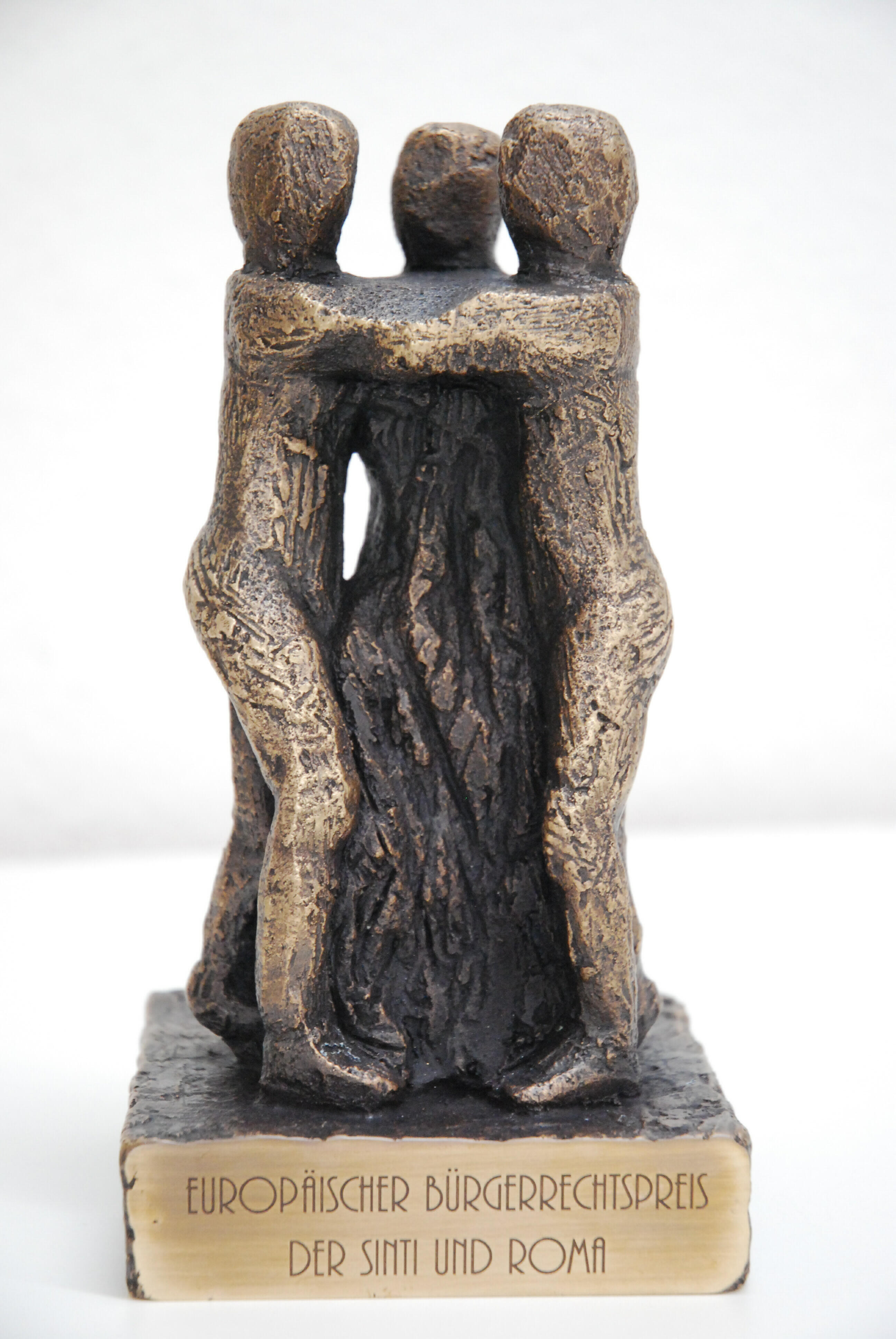
European Civil Rights Prize of the Sinti and Roma

The European Civil Rights Prize of the Sinti and Roma was founded in November 2007 in Heidelberg by the Central Council of German Sinti and Roma, the Documentation and Cultural Centre of German Sinti and Roma and the Manfred Lautenschläger Foundation. The international prize is endowed with 15,000 Euro by the Foundation. It was awarded for the first time in December 2008.

== Intention of the prize ==
Against the background of the human rights situation of the Sinti and Roma in many European states – especially in eastern and southeastern Europe – this prize was created to contribute towards the protection and assertion of the civil rights and the equality of opportunity of the members of these minorities in their respective countries. At the same time, the prize should be regarded as a signal to politicians, media and social groups in Europe to take action against deeply rooted clichés and structures of prejudice, in order to gradually overcome their everyday marginalization. The prize is intended to strengthen social engagement and prompt politicians and citizens to actively call for the effective equality of treatment of Sinti and Roma and their integration into all areas of public life.

== Award criteria ==
The prize supports political and social efforts for the lasting protection of the Sinti and Roma people. The prize honours individuals, groups or institutions primarily from the majority, who face up to the historical responsibility and have been exemplary in calling for an improvement in the human rights situation.

== Award procedure ==
The decision is made by an international jury consisting of eight members. Permanent members of the jury are the head of the Central Council of German Sinti and Roma and the head of the Manfred-Lautenschläger-Foundation. They choose the other four jury-members, who are appointed for four years. Every jury-member is able to nominate laureates, the election results from majority decision. Award winners are not eligible for a second prize.

== Jury members ==
=== Presidency ===
- Romani Rose (head of the Central Council and of the Documentation and Cultural Centre of German Sinti and Roma, Heidelberg)
- Manfred Lautenschläger (head of the Manfred Lautenschläger Foundation, founder of the MLP.AG)

=== Members (2010) ===
- Anastasia Crickley (Committee on the Elimination of Racial Discrimination)
- Maud de Boer-Buquicchio (Deputy Secretary General)
- Roman Kwiatkowski (head of the directorate of the Roma association, Poland)
- László Teleki (head of the interministerial committee of Roma issues, Hungary)
- Erwin Teufel (former premier of Baden-Württemberg)
- Johan Weisz (Dutch businessman)

== Laureates ==
year	name	function
2008	Wladyslaw Bartoszewski	State Secretary and adviser in regards to foreign affairs of the Polish prime minister
2010	Simone Veil	Former president of the European Parliament
2012	Thomas Hammarberg	Commissioner for Human Rights at the Council of Europe
2014	Tilman Zülch	Founder and general secretary of the Society for Threatened Peoples
2016	Amnesty International	Non-governmental organization focused on human rights
2019	Andrej Kiska	President of Slovakia from 2014 to 2019
2019 (special prize)	Piotr Cywiński	Director of the Auschwitz-Birkenau State Museum
2021	Angela Merkel	Chancellor of Germany from 2005 to 2021
2023	Daniel Libeskind	American architect
2025	George Soros	Hungarian and American investor and philanthropist
