= Jakob Bamberger =

German activist

Jakob "Johnny" Bamberger (11 December 1913 – 1989) was a Sinti boxer and later an activist in the Romani civil rights movement.

== Life ==
Jakob Bamberger was born in Königsberg, East Prussia, the son of Julius Bamberger, a horse trader and owner of a movie theater that is now a historical building called Das Kleine Kino in Ebersberg. In 1935, the Nazis forced the family to cease operation of the theater; from 1935 to 1939, Jakob worked for the national railway.

During Bamberger's boxing career, which began in 1933, he would set foot in the ring over four hundred times. In 1936, he was selected for the Olympic boxing team, but was excluded from competition when the team was purged of "non-Aryans". On 15 April 1938, he lost the championship match to Nikolaus Obermauer and became German Vice Champion in the Flyweight class. In 1939, he was runner-up at the European Championship in Dublin. In 1940, he was third in his class at the championship in Königsberg.

His family was deported to a concentration camp in 1940. Jakob attempted to escape to Czechoslovakia but was apprehended at the border and subsequently interned at Flossenbürg on 5 January 1942. Bamberger was classified as "antisocial" and assigned the black triangle. On 14 December 1943, he was transferred to Dachau. In Dachau, he was subjected to the Nazi sea trials for periods extending to 18 days. In 1945, he was transferred to Buchenwald. In April of the same year, he was liberated when U.S. troops intercepted the Flossenbürg-bound transport on which he was being held.

Most of Bamberger's family were murdered in the Holocaust, including his mother Maria and two siblings. For many years after the war he was engaged in litigation for reparations, which he was awarded in 1969. The German government claimed that Bamberger's kidney injuries were sports-related, and so only the minimum reparation amount was paid. Bamberger was an active member of the Central Council of German Sinti and Roma. During the spring of 1980, he and eleven other Sinti returned to Dachau on a hunger strike, in protest of their perceived second-class status. A Dachau district magistrate threatened the group with one year in prison is they followed through with the strike; the group came anyway. According to Center for Transatlantic Relations fellow Elizabeth Pond, the protest resulted in the West German government being "shamed into admitting that there had been postwar injustices against Sinti and that the 'necessary dismantling of prejudice and discrimination' has yet to be achieved."

The Bamberger family continued activists efforts after his death, working with renowned Roma professor Ian Hancock in monitoring the web for defamation and other discriminatory activities and misinformation.

One of the Bamberger activists, Jakob's great niece Daniela Stolfi (daughter of Sita Bamberger) set precedence as the first Sinti to receive a college scholarship as Sinti, due to the research done by Dr. Ian Hancock that showed the origin of Roma to be in India, therefore allowing Sinti and Roma to be classified as Indian.
