= Romani people in Algeria =

Total population
- ? >2,500

Languages
- French, Spanish, ? Romani

Religion
- Christianity, ? Islam

Related ethnic groups
- Dom people, Nawar people, Kawliya

Romani people in Algeria historically included Gitanos who migrated there along with other Spanish people in the late 19th century, during the French colonial period; most of these left for France following Algeria's independence in 1962, resulting in a large community in the South of France. Ratcliffe (1933) describes a Gitano encampment on the heights above Algiers, whose Catholic inhabitants sold lace and mended chairs. Notable descendants of the Gitanos who used to live in Algeria include the film-maker Tony Gatlif and the footballer André-Pierre Gignac.

Thomas (2000) reports that two other groups may be present: the Afrikaya, described as "possibly Manouche or French-speaking Gypsies originally from France", and the Xoraxane, a Muslim Roma group more usually associated with the Balkans.

Roma in general ultimately come from South Asia, particularly from Northern India, having reached the Mediterranean region in Byzantine times. Their historic language is Romani, retained by some but not all groups today.

Other specialist wandering groups, present in Algeria since before colonial times, have sometimes been compared to Romani groups. In particular, the Beni Ades of central Algeria and the Amer of western Algeria have traditionally lived a peripatetic lifestyle, specialising in tattooing, circumcision, horse-trading, and fortune-telling. No direct relation between these and the Roma has been established.

== See also ==
- Pied-Noir
