= Raymond Gurême =

French activist and circus performer (1925–2020)

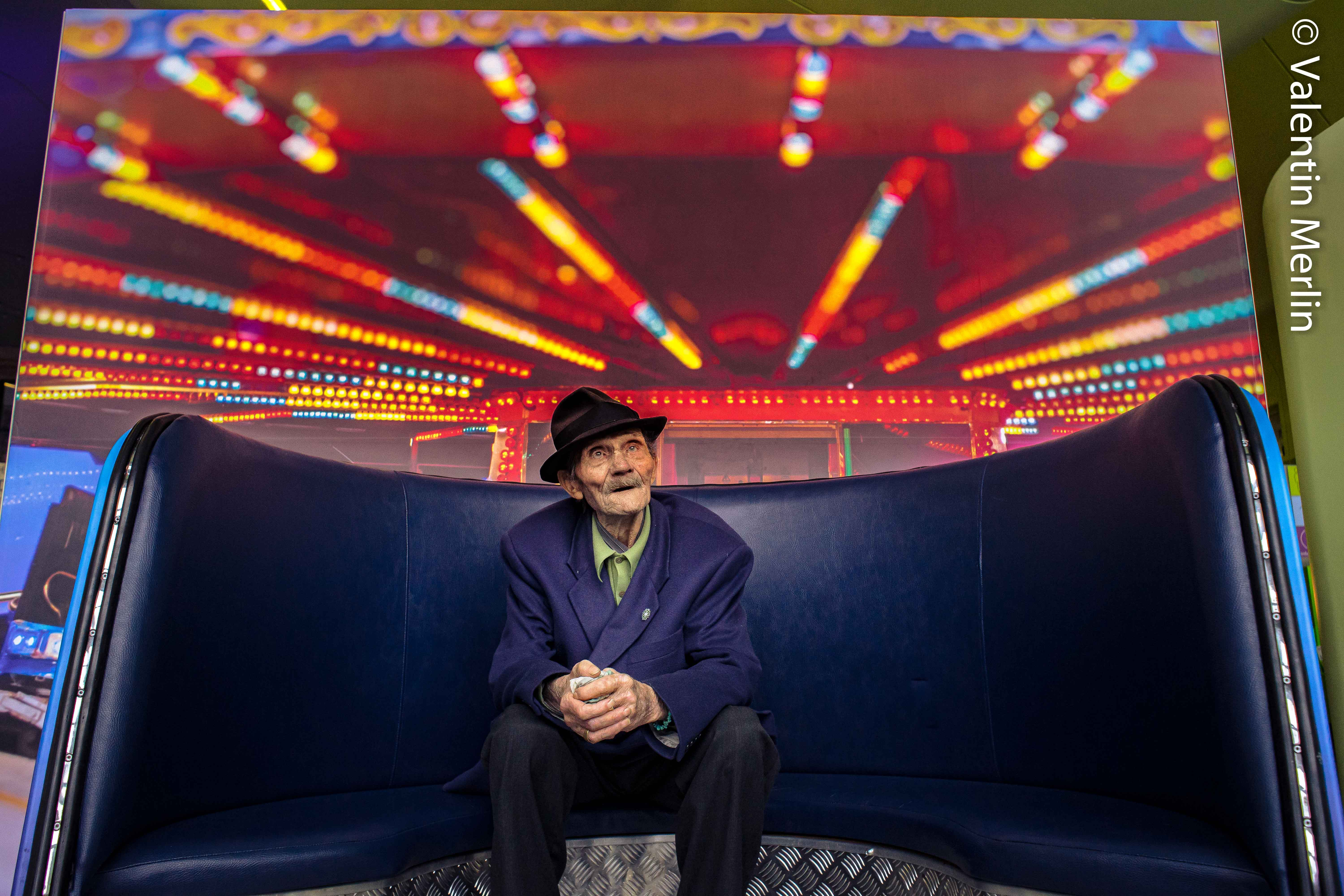
- Born: 11 August 1925
- Died: 24 May 2020 (aged 94)
- Occupations: Activist, circus performer
- Spouse: Pauline Gurême
- Relatives: Hubert Leroux Gurême (father); Mélanie Gurême (mother)

Raymond Gurême (11 August 1925 – 25 May 2020) was a French Romani activist, circus performer, and Holocaust survivor. He is known for his various escapes from internment camps during World War II, as well as his involvement in the French Resistance Movement. After the war, Gurême continued advocating for better awareness of the Romani Holocaust and the rights of Romani people in France, co-authoring the book Interdit aux Nomades ('Forbidden to Nomads') alongside Isabelle Ligner, which describes his experiences during the war.

== Early years ==
Born to a Manouche family in Meigneux, Seine-et-Marne, who owned a traveling circus and cinema, he spent his early years touring around France, Belgium, and Switzerland. Son to an acrobat, film projectionist, musician, and World War I veteran father, and a mother who had taught all 9 children the various circus arts, Gurême performed in his family's traveling circus from the age of two as an acrobat and clown. Later in his childhood, he also became a horse tamer and assisted with the family cinema. During his early years Gurême experienced the effects of increasing French restriction over the movement of so-called nomadic people, which escalated with the start of the Second World War, resulting in the April 6 ban of movement of nomads in 1940.

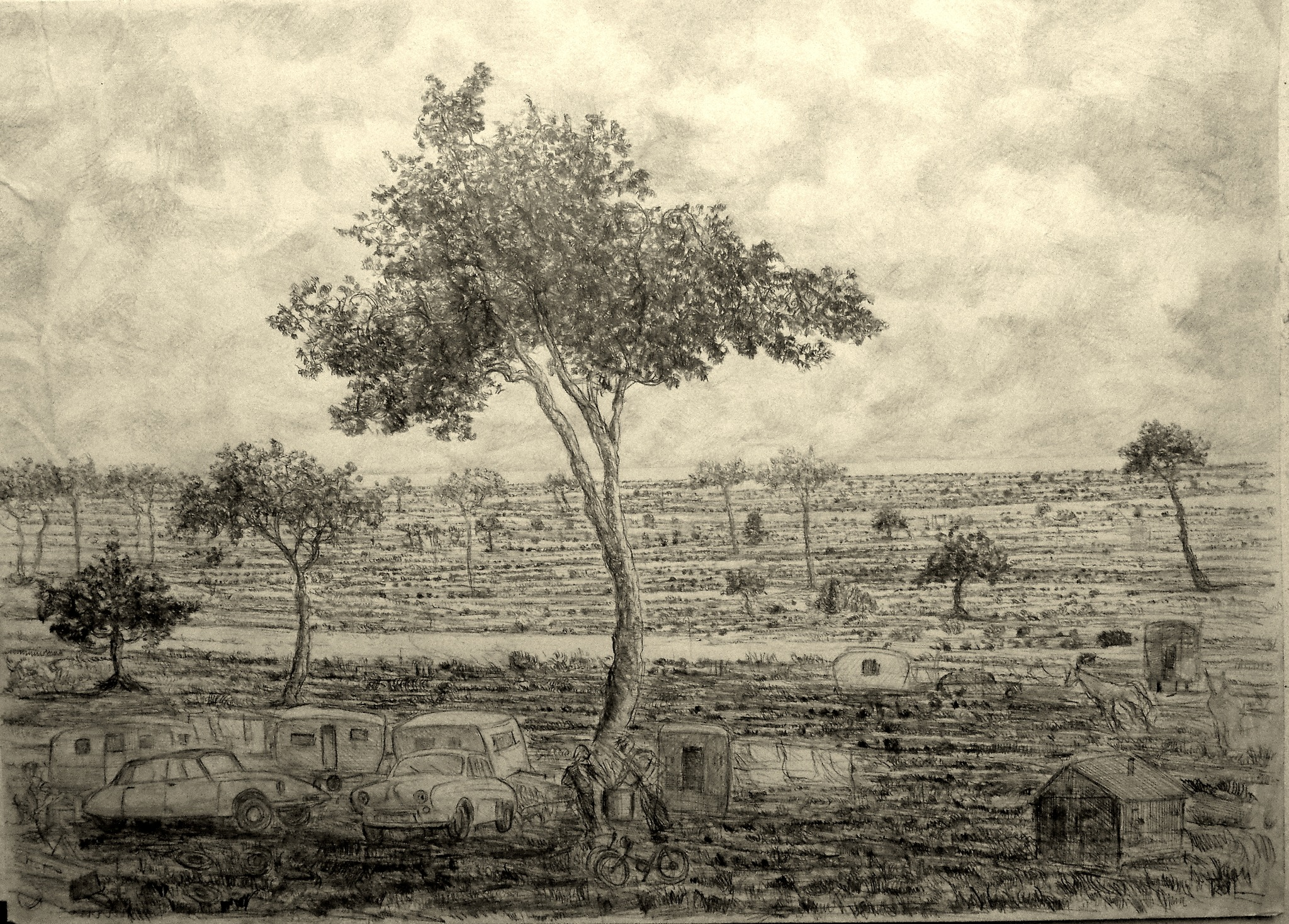
Drawing depicting manouche caravans

== During World War II ==
=== Internment of the Gurême family ===
On 4 October 1940, when he was 15 years old, Gurême's life reached a pivot point as he and his family were arrested by French gendarmes in Petit-Couronne-Nieran and moved to a nomadic people internment camp ("gypsy camp") in Darnétal, Normandy. This was a result of the ongoing Nazi invasion of France, resulting in the October 4th internment of Romani people in 1940, significantly altering the Gurême family's non-sedentary lifestyle prior to the war. After the Gurême family spent a month in the Darnétal camp, they were moved to another internment camp in Linas-Montlhéry, located on the grounds of a well-known motor racing track.

=== First escape ===
During his time in Linas-Montlhéry, Gurême attempted his first escape with his brother on 26 July 1941. However, their escape was short-lived, and the two were arrested and denounced on August 14 of the same year.

=== Second escape ===
On 5 October 1941, Gurême successfully escaped from the Linas-Montlhéry internment camp for the second time. He had been placed in a small wooden hut in solitary confinement, after helping a young Romani boy who was beaten by policemen. After a month in solitary confinement, Gurême utilized his former skills as an acrobat to release himself from his handcuffs, and wedge the wooden planks of his cell, allowing him to escape. His escape resulted in arm injuries. Next, he ran off to the edge of the camp and into the woods, climbing a tree and successfully dodging the policeman and dogs following him. After staying there overnight, Gurême began his 140-kilometer journey back to the Darnétal camp, keeping a low profile throughout his journey. Once there, Gurême retrieved some of his family's possessions, which they had been forced to leave behind when moving from the Darnétal camp.

After leaving the Darnétal camp, Gurême made his way back to Linas-Montlhéry, working for farmers along the way. When he made it to Linas-Montlhéry, he proceeded to break into the camp a handful of times, bringing food to and spending time with family and friends at night and leaving by morning unnoticed. He continued working in the fields during this time. On his fourth re-entry into the camp, Gurême was caught by policemen and taken into custody. He was sent to the Villa des Roses, an internment camp and reform school in Angers for juvenile delinquents, orphans, and resistance members. Inside the camp, he got a job in the hospital.

=== Joining the French Resistance ===
During his time in the Villa des Roses, he was recruited into the French Resistance by an injured man he met. His first mission on behalf of the Resistance involved the theft of a German army truck filled with supplies. Driving out of the camp and into Angers, Gurême was faced with Resistance fighters dressed as Nazi soldiers, successfully completing his assignment. However, his escape and theft of the truck were quickly traced back to him and he was placed in the German-run Angers prison Pré-Pigeon. After the Angers prison, he also spent some time in the Troyes military prison.

=== Time in Germany ===
After his arrest, Gurême was sent to the Hedderneim disciplinary camp near Frankfurt, Germany. Faced with continuous maltreatment, Gurême decided to escape, this time with two of his fellow inmates. He hid in the Black Forest for various days until his recapture by the Hitler Youth. Following his recapture, he was placed in a high discipline camp in Oberursel. In this camp, his work involved the retrieval of dead bodies from buildings attacked by the Allies. During his time in Oberursel, he experienced severe and violent conditions. In his autobiography, Gurême recalls intentionally working slowly in the camp, which was responded to with violent punishment.

While working in a train station during his time in Oberursel, Gurême encountered another opportunity to escape. On 15 June 1944, he hid inside a pile of coal in a train going to France, getting help from the train's French driver.

=== Returning to France ===
Once Gurême returned to France, hearing of the D-day landings of Allied forces in Normandy on 6 June 1944, he decided to re-join the Resistance. He managed to meet up with the French Forces of the Interior (FFI), which accepted him into their forces despite his nomad status. During this time, the FFI were receiving orders from London through the exiled French government and fought diligently for the reoccupation of Paris by Allied forces. Gurême was involved in various missions in Porte de la Chapelle, Saint-Denis, Enghien, Pontoise and Argenteuil, as well as street fighting during the liberation of Paris. On August 25, 1944, the liberation of Paris marked the surrender of Nazi forces in Paris.

Despite the full liberation of France at the end of WWII, there were still interned nomads up until June 1946. This made it difficult for Gurême to reunite with his family after the war.

=== The Gurême family after Linas-Montlhéry ===
After Raymond was separated from the rest of the Gurême family following his transfer to the reformatory in 1941, they proceeded to get transferred between multiple internment camps in the following years. First to a camp in Mulsanne in April 1942, then to Montreuil-Bellay in August 1942 . The Gurême family was liberated in 1943. In 1950, Raymond got word from a Belgian fairground worker that his family was near Vielsalm, Belgium. Raymond proceeded to drive and walk 400 kilometers in order to reunite with his family.

== Post-war life and recognition ==
After World War II, the Gurême family had nothing left, with their caravan, circus, and other possessions gone by Raymond's return to France in 1944. They received neither financial compensation nor recognition from the French state until 2010, when Secretary of State for Defense and Veterans Affairs Hubert Falco recognized the racist nature of nomadic internment during WWII in his speech on the National Day of Remembrance of the victims of racist and anti-Semitic persecutions. Moreover, despite being eligible for a 'political internee' card and applying for one in the 1980s, it took almost 27 years for Gurême to receive in 2009. On April, 2011 Gurêmewas awarded the Chevalier des Arts et Lettres honorary distinction from the French Ministry of Culture and Communication.

Despite the growing number of tributes to nomadic people who were interned during the war, Gurême continued to face discrimination after the war. Most notably, on September 23, 2014, Raymond was approached by French policemen, who requested to carry out a search of his trailer. 89 year old at the time, Gurême refused to let them in, which lead to an alleged severe beating of Gurême.

=== Testimony and activism ===
In 2004, Gurême testified for the first time about his experiences during the war in front of the General Assembly of the Departmental Association of Voyageurs (AGDV). Gurême continued telling his story to middle-schoolers and high-schoolers across France and Europe. He also visited Auschwitz yearly for the international youth meetings, telling his story to the younger generation.

In 2017, Gurême strongly opposed the French far-right presidential candidate Marine Le Pen.

=== Personal life ===
After the war, Gurême married Pauline and had 15 children. Together, the married couple worked as scrap dealers, market vendors, and migrant farm workers. In the 1960s, Gurême decided to buy a plot of land in front of the Linas-Montlhéry camp, and his family continues to live there to this day.

Gurême died on 24 May 2020, at the age of 95.
