= Wawau Adler =

German gypsy jazz guitarist

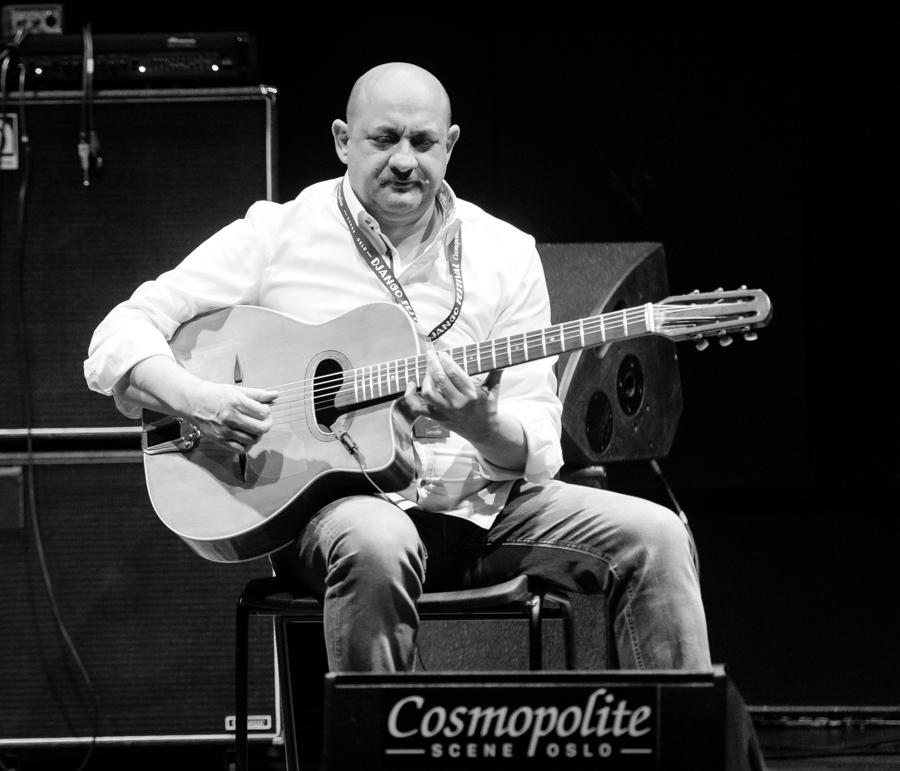
Wawau Adler, Djangofestivalen 2019

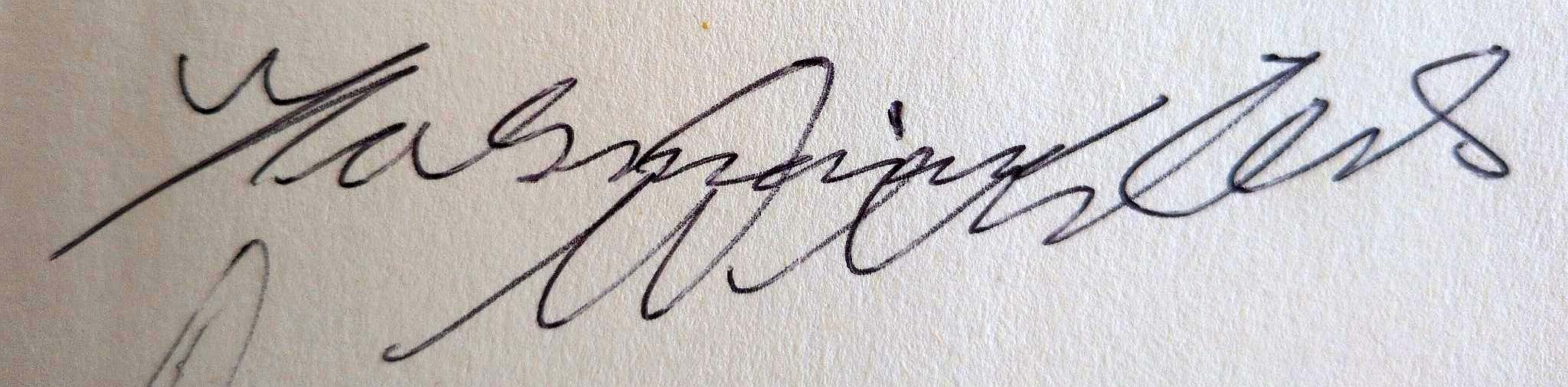
Signature of the german sinti jazz guitarist Holzmanno Winterstein, member in the trio

Josef Wawau Adler (born 25 January 1967, in Karlsruhe) is a German-Romani jazz guitarist. Born into a family of Sinti Roma, he is heavily influenced by Django Reinhardt, but also Wes Montgomery, Charlie Parker, Pat Martino and George Benson. He formed a trio with Holzmanno Winterstein and Axel Miller, and has also played with Andreas Öberg and Joel Locher, the bassist who he released Here’s to Django with in 2010, and many others.2013 Recorded Wawau Adler the CD Expressions with Hono Winterstein Eva Slongo Joel Locher and Bertrand Le Guillou. In 2020 Wawau released his current CD Happy Birthday Django 110 by GLM music. Latest CD I play with you GLM music. 2022
