= Beni Ades =

Itinerant group

Total population
- ?

Regions with significant populations
- north-central Algeria

Languages
- Arabic

Religion
- Islam

The Beni Ades (Arabic بني عداس bnī ʕdās, Kabyle Bni Ɛdas) are an itinerant group living in north-central Algeria, negatively stereotyped by the wider population and often loosely compared to the Roma.

In 1851, Alexandre Dumas describes these "Bohemians" as an endogamous itinerant group of horse-traders and fortune-tellers, and recounts colourful anecdotes of their horse-trading scams around Sétif. In the early 20th century, they are described in similar terms as specialists in tattooing, circumcision, horse-trading, and fortune-telling.

As the practice of tattooing declined over the 20th century, they turned to other pursuits. By the early 21st century, a Beni Ades community in Tizi-Ouzou is described as making its living by begging and sand-mining, while rejecting school for the children, and claiming Tunisian nationality despite having come to the area from Algiers.

The Beni Ades are reported to regularly visit certain saints' tombs, notably those of Sidi Ahmed ou Yousof in Miliana and Sidi Khelifa in Saïda Province.

== See also ==
- Romani people in Algeria
- Itinerant groups in Europe
