= Tayo Awosusi-Onutor =

German musician, writer, filmmaker and human rights activist, born 1978

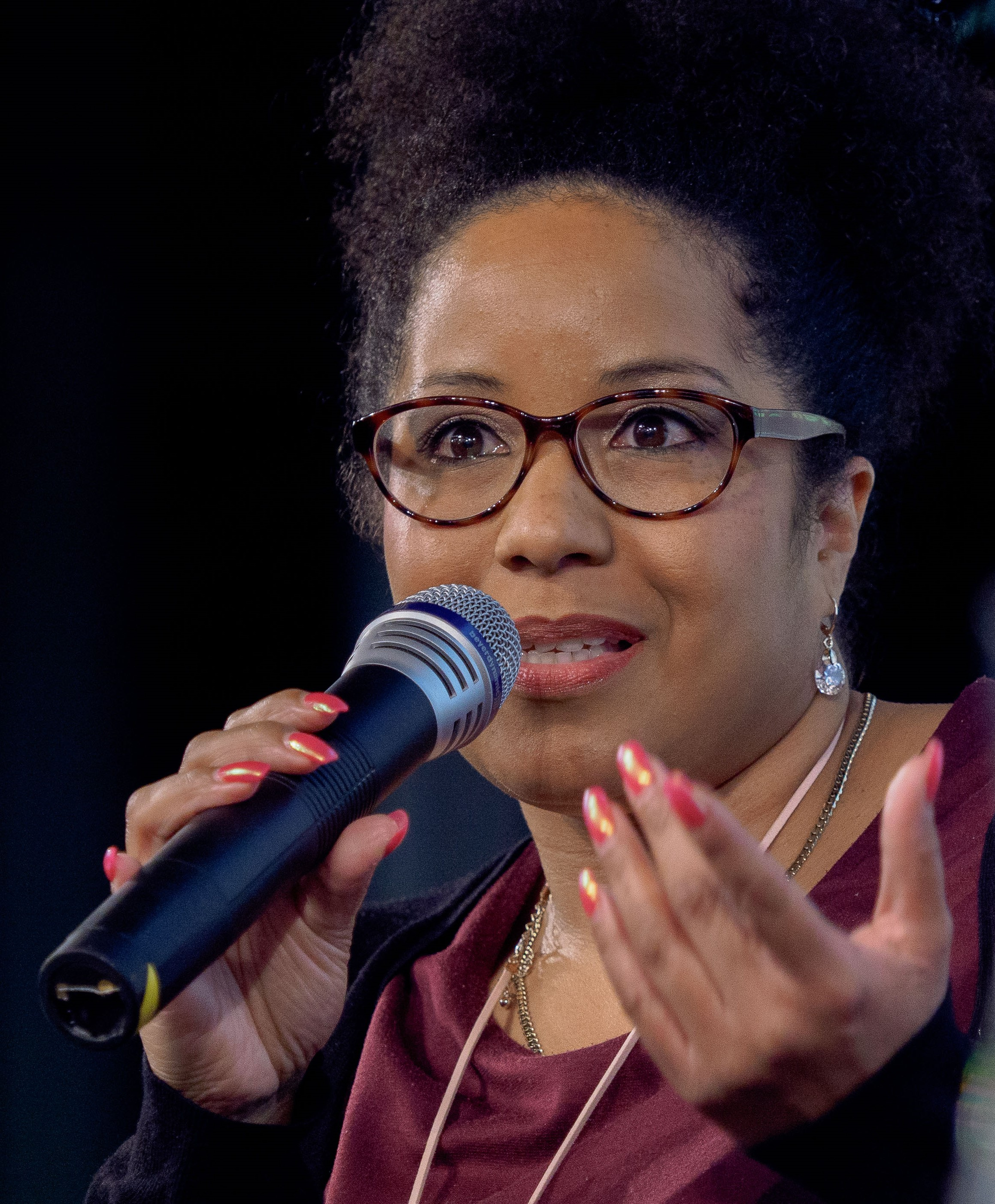
- Born: 8 March 1978 (age 48); Karlsruhe, West Germany
- Education: Heidelberg University, Karlsruhe Institute of Technology
- Occupations: Musician, writer, human rights activist
- Mother: Anita Awosusi
- Website: https://www.tayo-online.de/

Tayo Awosusi-Onutor (born 8 March 1978 in Karlsruhe, Germany), also known as Tayo Awosusi, is a German Afro-Sinta musician, writer, filmmaker and human rights activist. As singer-songwriter, she performs her music in English, German and Romani. As public speaker, she is also politically active in various German communities of colour. Further, she is known for her contributions in German public media about the history and human rights of Sinti and persons of color.

== Background ==
Awosusi-Onutor refers to herself as "Afro-Sintez(z)a" of German-Nigerian origin. Her mother is the German Sinta and civil rights activist Anita Awosusi, an activist for the rights of Sinti and Roma who has published various works about the history and persecution of their ethnic group. Her Nigerian-born father Hope Awosusi performed as a soul and funk musician. The name Tayo comes from the Nigerian language Yoruba and means "child of joy." Having grown up with three native languages, she speaks German, English and Romanes.

Awosusi-Onutor grew up in Ettlingen near Karlsruhe, where she graduated from secondary school in 1997. After studying German and English literature as well as Multimedia studies at the Universities of Heidelberg and the Karlsruhe Institute of Technology, she moved to Berlin in 2004 and has since dedicated herself to her career as musician, writer and activist.

Since then, she has performed as singer-songwriter with various musicians, including Romani guitarist Ferenc Snétberger. Among other performances, she participated in the 2014 Black Bazar Berlin.

== Activism for human rights and diversity ==
Awosusi-Onutor has particitpated in public discussions and conferences on racism against Sinti and Romani people in German society. At a 2022 conference about the culture of remembrance at the Barenboim–Said Academy in Berlin, she stressed that the history of the Nazi persecution of Romani people must not be forgotten, and that their human rights today must be protected after talking to those affected, not just about them. Further, she is a member of the NGO's RomaniPhen and IniRromnja, documenting and explaining Romani women's history and persecution.

At a course for Yale University's Center for the Study of Race, Indigeneity, and Transnational Migration (RITM), titled Decolonizing Europe, Awosusi-Onutor spoke along other international panelists about Roma, Resistance & Intersectionality.

In 2017 she released her documentary film Phral mende - Wir über uns with members of the German Sinti community that premiered at the Jewish Museum in Berlin. In 2021, Awosusi-Onutor published her first children’s book Jokesi Club. Jekh, Dui, Drin – 3 girlfriends in Berlin, featuring Romani children. Further, she wrote the definition of Romani and Sinti people for the 2023 dictionary Vielfalt.Das andere Wörterbuch. (English: Diversity. The other dictionary). This dictionary by the renowned Duden publishers explains 100 words relating to diversity in contemporary German society.

== Selected publications ==
- Chapter on "Rom*nja und Sinti*zzi". In: Vielfalt. Das andere Wörterbuch. 100 Menschen. 100 Beiträge. 100 Wörter. Bibliographisches Institut, Berlin 2023, ISBN 3411756012.
- Awosusi-Onutor, Tayo; Awosusi, Olufemi Stella (2023). Jekh, Dui, Drin. 3 Freundinnen in Berlin. Jokesi Club (in German). Vol. 1. Berlin: omobooks. ISBN 978-3-9825346-1-9.
- Awosusi-Onutor, Tayo; Awosusi, Olufemi Stella (2023). Star, Bansh, Shop - Das Geheimnis des Kaleidoskops. Jokesi Club (in German). Vol. 2. Berlin: omobooks. ISBN 978-3-9825346-2-6.
- Kek Ducho - Eine Schwarze Romani Perspektive auf Rassismus und Erinnerungskultur – Essay on German Culture of Remembrance and Racism at Heinrich Böll Foundation, 2020, (in German)
- "Wir haben gelernt, angenommen zu sein" - Essay on identity and discrimination, at Heinrich Böll Foundation, 2018, (in German)
