= Romani people in France =

Ethnic group

Romani People in France
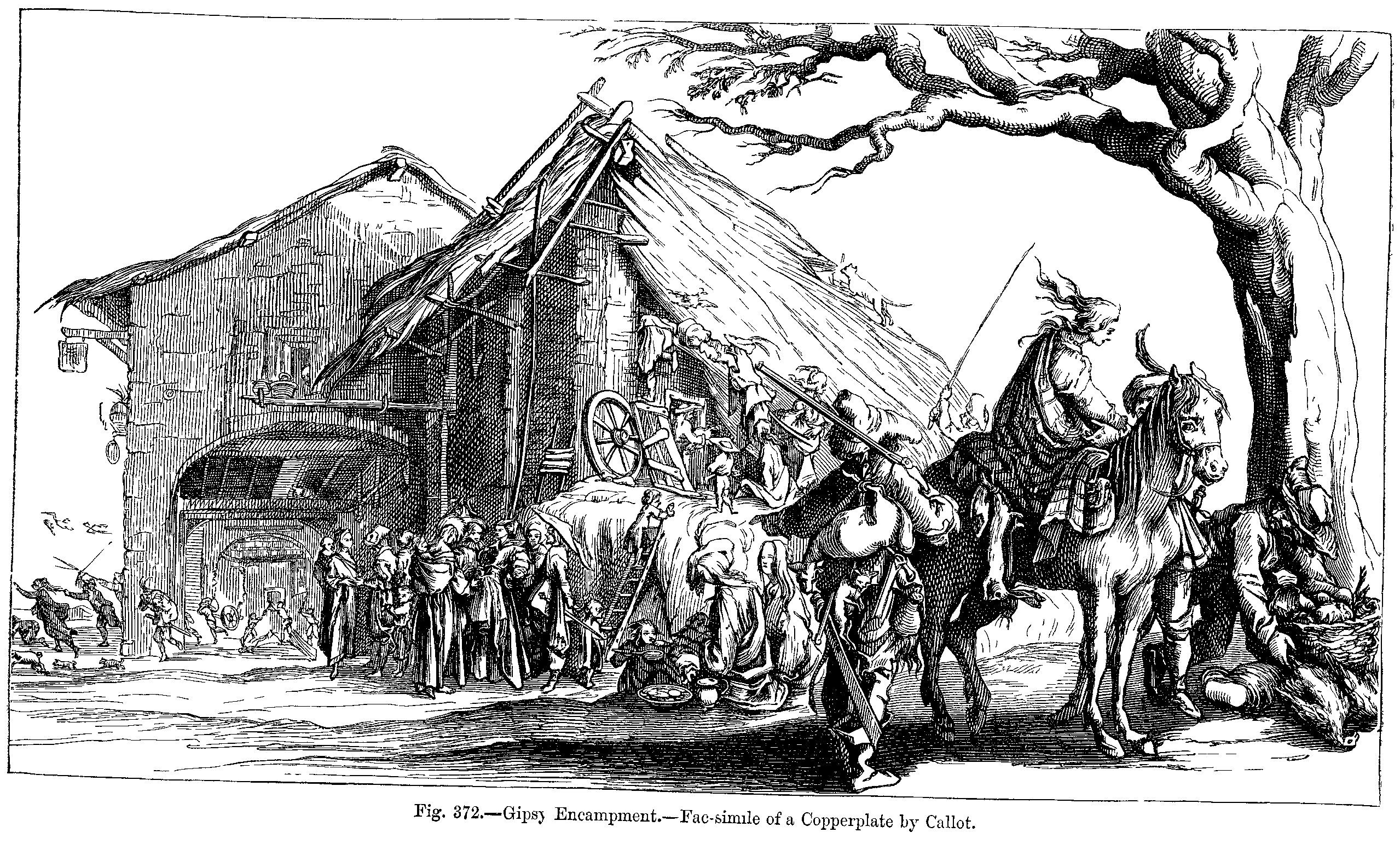

Total population
- est. 500,000 – 1,200,000

Regions with significant populations
- Alsace, Aquitaine, Île-de-France, Languedoc-Roussillon, Lorraine, Midi-Pyrénées, Nord-Pas-de-Calais, Provence-Alpes-Côte d'Azur, Rhône-Alpes, Bretagne

Languages
- Romani languages (Sinti-Manouche, Erromintxela, Kaló); French, Spanish

Religion
- Christianity (Evangelicalism and Roman Catholicism) Romani mythology, Islam

Related ethnic groups
- Primarily other Roma; Manouches: Sinti; Gitans/French Caló: Spanish Caló, Portuguese Caló, Brazilian Caló; Roms: Balkan Roma; Erromintxela: Kalderash, Basques, Cascarots; Cascarots: Spanish Roma, Erromintxela, Basques

Romani people in France (French: Roms en France), generally known in spoken French as gitans, tsiganes or manouches, are an Indo-Aryan ethnic group in France.

== History ==
The first Roma came to France in 1418, to the town of Colmar. In 1419, more Roma arrived in Provence and Savoy. Nine years later, the first Roma were recorded in Paris. In 1802, a concerted campaign was launched to remove Roma from the French Basque provinces. Over 500 Roma were captured and imprisoned, awaiting their planned deportation to the French colony of Louisiana. However, the colony was sold to the United States in 1803.

In 1962, the Romani population in France increased due to an influx of refugees from Algeria.

During Nazi Germany rule in occupied France, Roma in France were killed. After the collaborationist regime was established in 1940, the Vichy French authorities in France increased restrictive actions and harassment targeting Roma. Between 1941 and 1942, French police detained at least 3,000, or possibly up to 6,000, Romani people living in both occupied and unoccupied areas of France. However, French officials sent only a small number of Roma to camps in Germany, including Buchenwald, Dachau, and Ravensbrück.

== Culture ==
Every year in late May, Christian Romani people travel to Saintes-Maries-de-la-Mer for Saint Sarah.

Gypsy Jazz and flamenco are popular Romani genres in France. Gipsy Kings are a popular flamenco band from Spain. There are two important Romani music festivals in France. There is a gathering at Saintes Maries de la Mer where Romani people from France and Spain congregate to celebrate the feast day of the Romani patron saint, Saint Sarah, on May 24 and May 25 in the Camargue. The music at this festival is predominantly flamenco with a large population of musicians making the pilgrimage from Andalusia. Another festival, Mosaïque Gitane takes place each July every year in Arles.

Roma in France inspired Victor Hugo’s novel The Hunchback of Notre-Dame.

A well-known traditional dish among the nomadic French Roma is hedgehog stew, which is prepared using hedgehog meat.

The occupations of French Roma are traditionally nomadic, encompassing activities such as music, cinema, basket-weaving, furniture-making or repair, door-to-door sales (including sewing materials and lacework), and seasonal agricultural labor such as harvesting fruits and vegetables. Additionally, French Roma generate supplementary income through scrap metal collection, which has emerged as the most prevalent occupation within the French Roma community. They also engage in seasonal agricultural work and have adapted their former trades to fit new circumstances, such as selling clothing, accessories, and everyday essentials at local markets, as well as providing services like house cleaning, painting, garden maintenance, and furniture repair.

== Origin ==
Studies reveal that the Romani people originated in South Asia, presumably from the regions of present-day Punjab, Rajasthan and Sindh.

Linguistic, historical and genetic evidence suggests that the Romani people initially migrated from the north of present-day India or the east of modern Pakistan in the second half of the first millennium. They then spent a period of time in the Byzantine Empire before migrating across Europe, with various groups diverging from an initially unified proto-Romani-speaking community based in the Balkans.

The linguistic evidence has indisputably shown that roots of Romani language lie in South Asia: the language has grammatical characteristics of South Asian languages and shares with them a large part of the basic lexicon, for example, body parts and daily routines. However, their exact point of departure within the subcontinent has not been established with certainty. Romani's origins lie in the Central Indo-Aryan group of languages, such as Hindistani and Haryanvi, from present-day northern central India. However, the Romani languages also share some linguistic innovations found in the Northwestern Indo-Aryan group of languages, like Panjabi and Sindhi. Therefore it is possible either that their dialect was a transitional form between Central and Northwestern Indo-Aryan, or that they migrated from the central region to modern-day northwestern India and western Pakistan, residing there for a period of time before migrating further west.

Genetic findings in 2012 suggest the Romani migrated from South Asia as a single group. According to a genetic study in 2012, the ancestors of present scheduled tribes and scheduled caste populations of northern India, traditionally referred to collectively as the Ḍoma, are the likely ancestral populations of modern European Roma.

== Population ==
In France the Romani people are typically classified into three groups:

- "Manouches", also known as "Sinté" (in Germany and Holland: Sinti), who often have familial ties in Germany and Italy, who form the majority of Romani groups
- "Gitans", who trace their familial ties to Romani people in Spain
- "Roms", who come from territories in eastern Europe

The term "Romanichel" is considered pejorative in France, and "Bohémien" is outdated. Members of the Romani minority often call themselves Voyageurs (Travellers). The French National Gendarmerie referred to them in an ethnic database by the acronym "MENS" ("Minorités Ethniques Non-Sédentarisées"), an administrative term meaning "Travelling Ethnic Minorities". However this usage is not widely used, since this ethnic database was secret as creating ethnic data is illegal in France.

The exact numbers of Romani people in France are not known, with estimates varying from 20,000 to 400,000, depending whether they include or not sedentary Roma, Manouches and cognate groups who intermingled with non-Roma Travellers (including Yenish people). The vast majority of this population uses a variety of French, usually called Voyageur, as their native language.

The French Romani rights group FNASAT reports that at least 12,000 Balkan Romani, who have immigrated from Romania and Bulgaria, live in unofficial urban camps throughout the country. French authorities often attempt to close down these encampments. In 2009, the government sent more than 10,000 Romani back to Romania and Bulgaria.

In 2009, the European Committee of Social Rights found France had violated the European Social Charter (rights to housing, right to protection against poverty and social exclusion, right of the family to protection) in respect to Romani population from foreign countries.

== Gallery ==
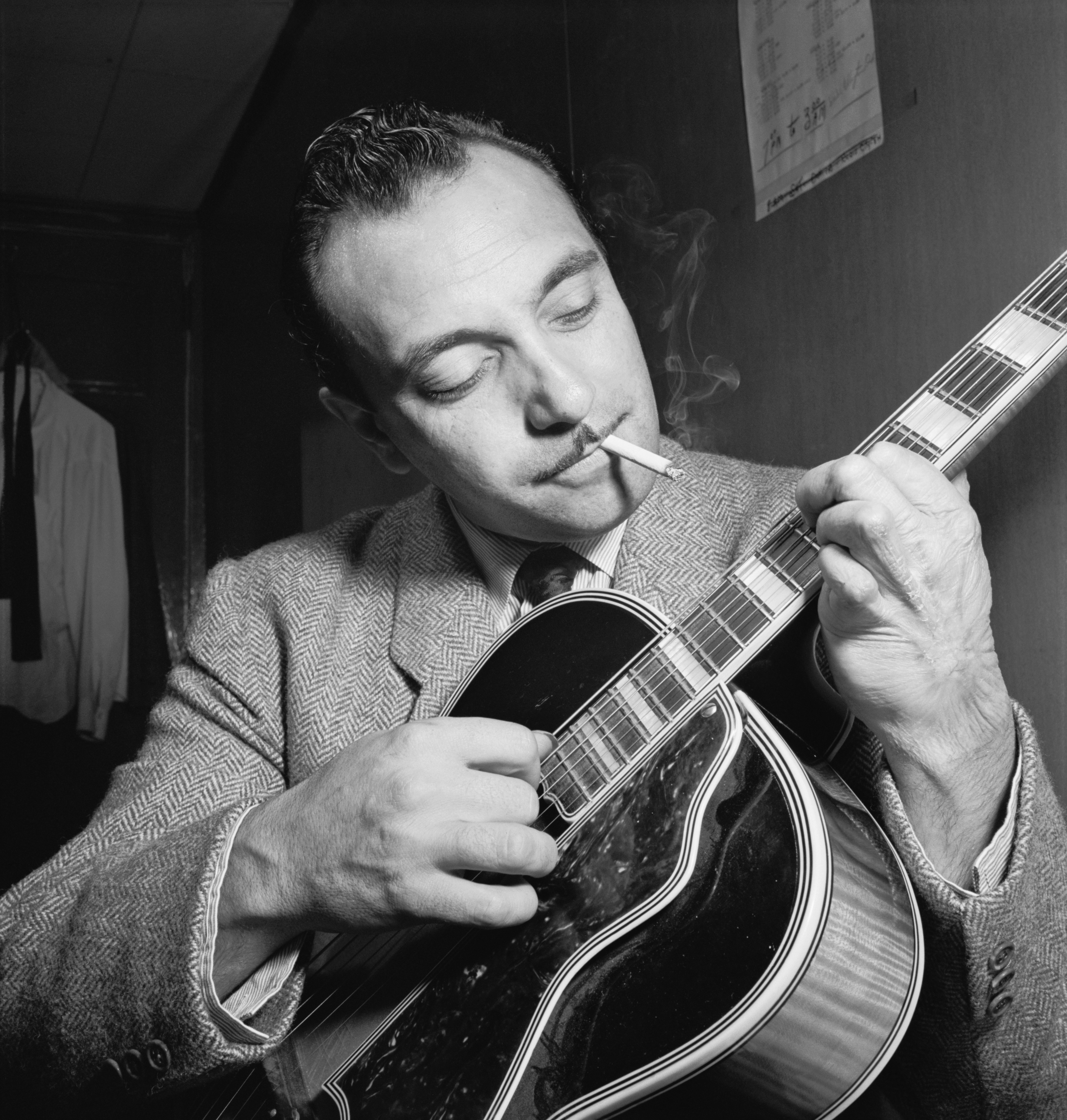
Guitar player Django Reinhardt.

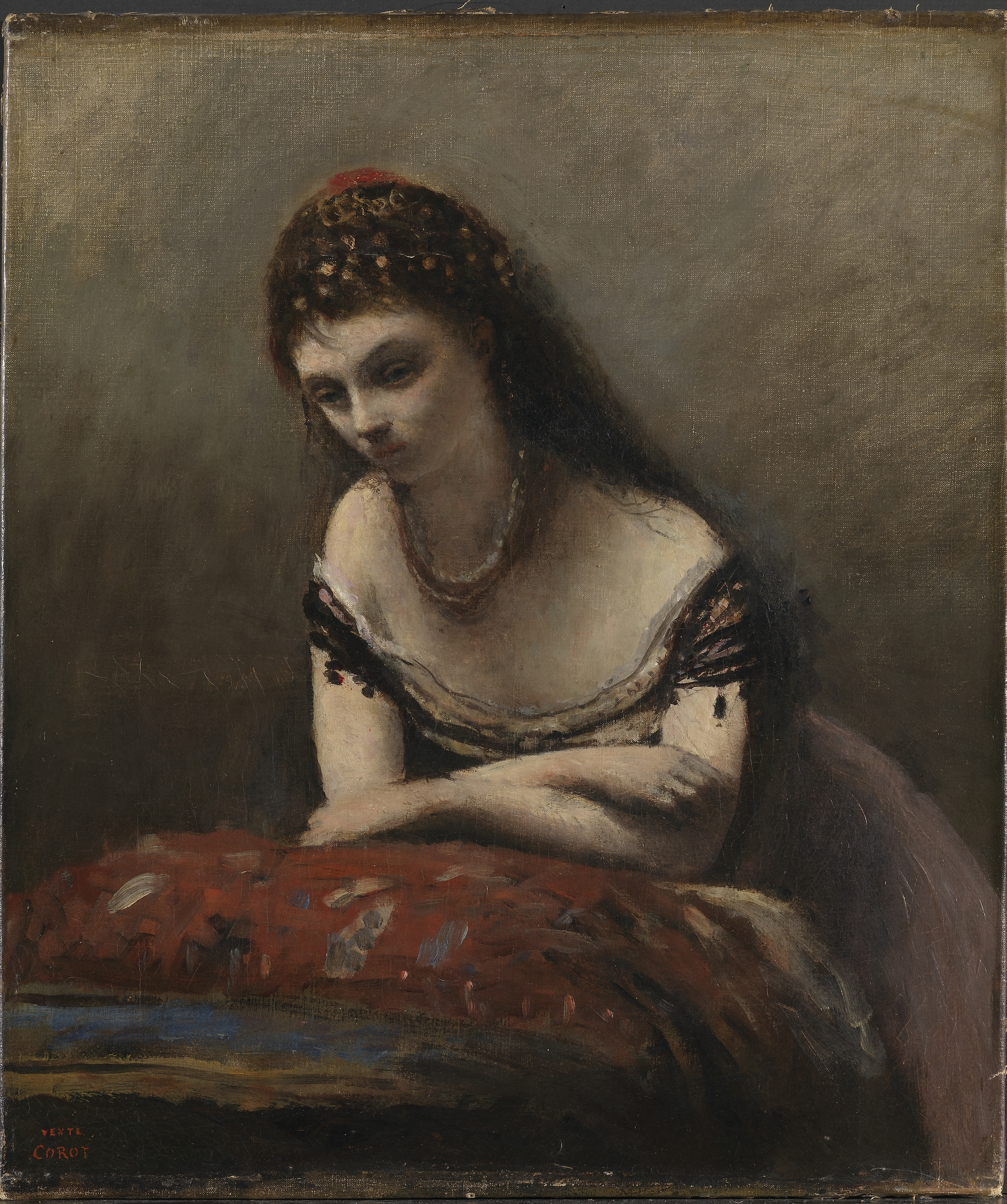
Painting of a Romani female by Jean-Baptiste-Camille Corot, c. 1870-1872

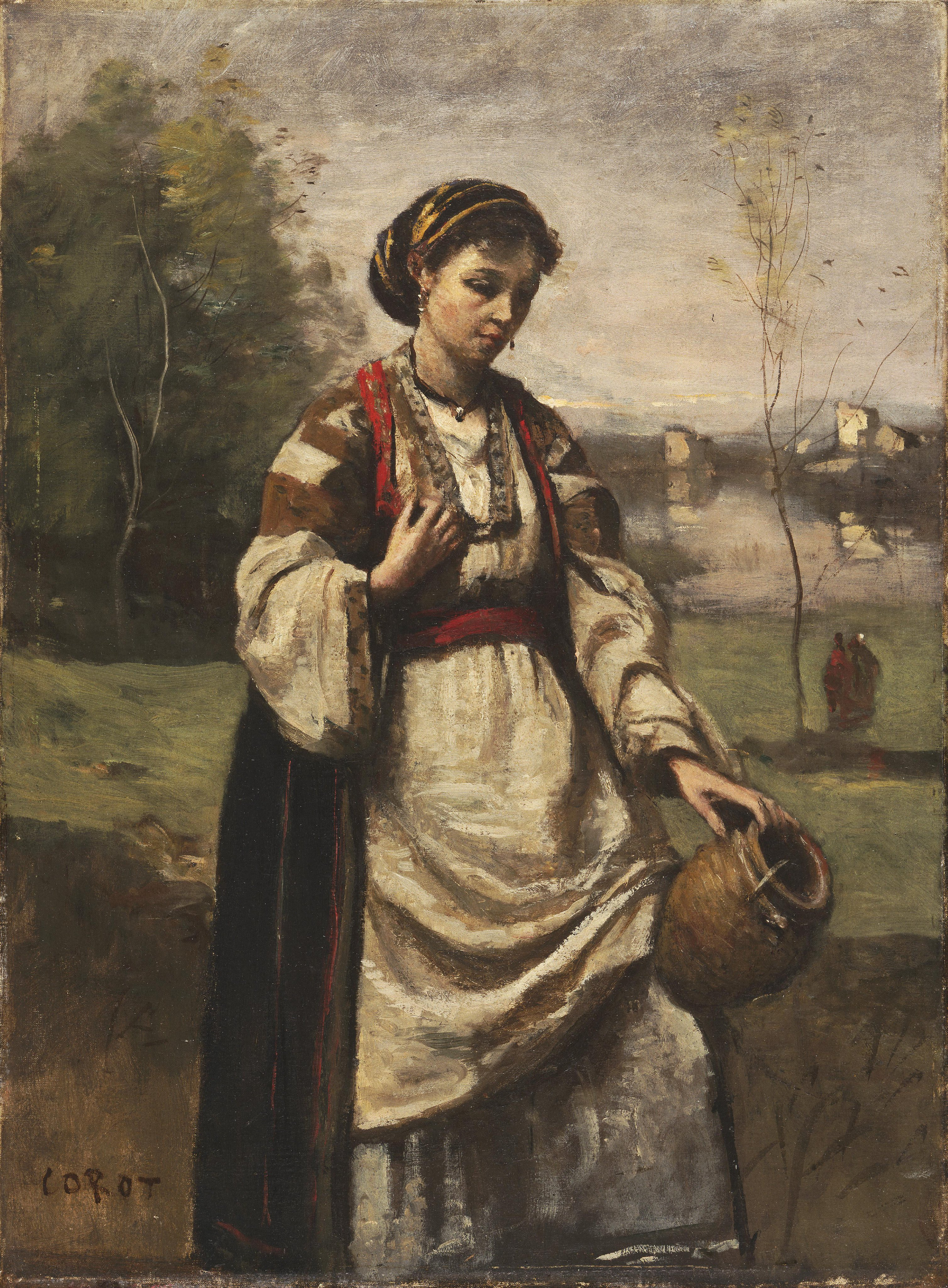
Painting of a Romani woman at a fountain in France, by Jean-Baptiste-Camille Corot, c. 1865-1870

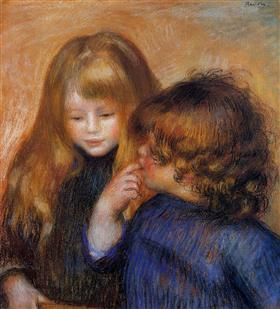
Painting of two Romani girls in France by Pierre-Auguste Renoir, c. 1902

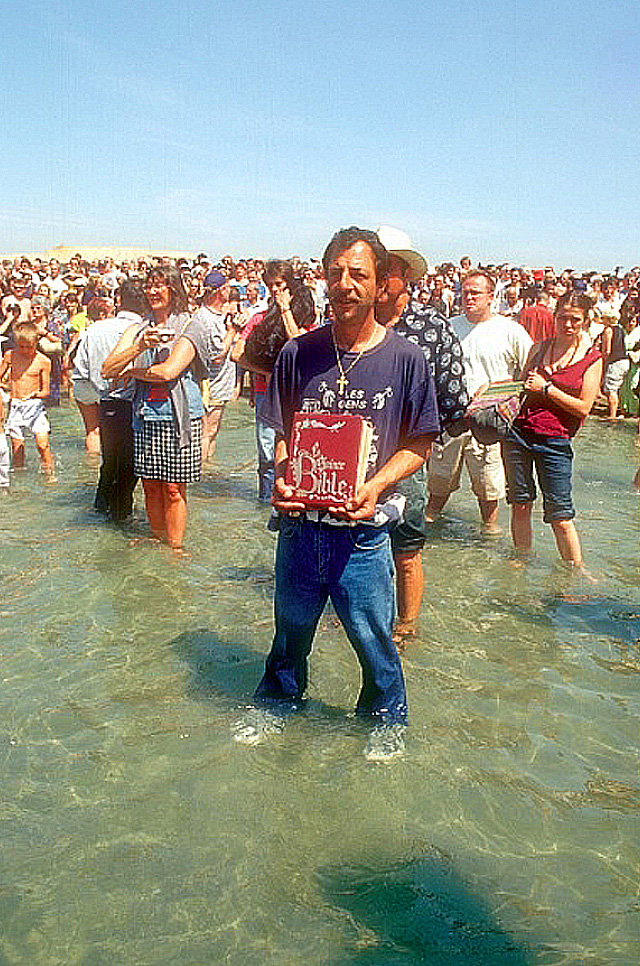
Ritual bath in Saintes-Maries-de-la-Mer, a shrine associated with Romani people.

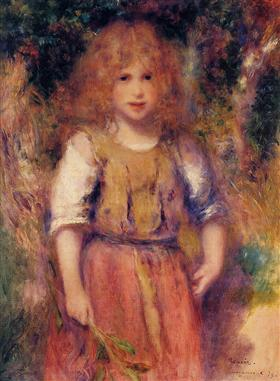
Painting of a Romani girl in France by Pierre-Auguste Renoir, 1879

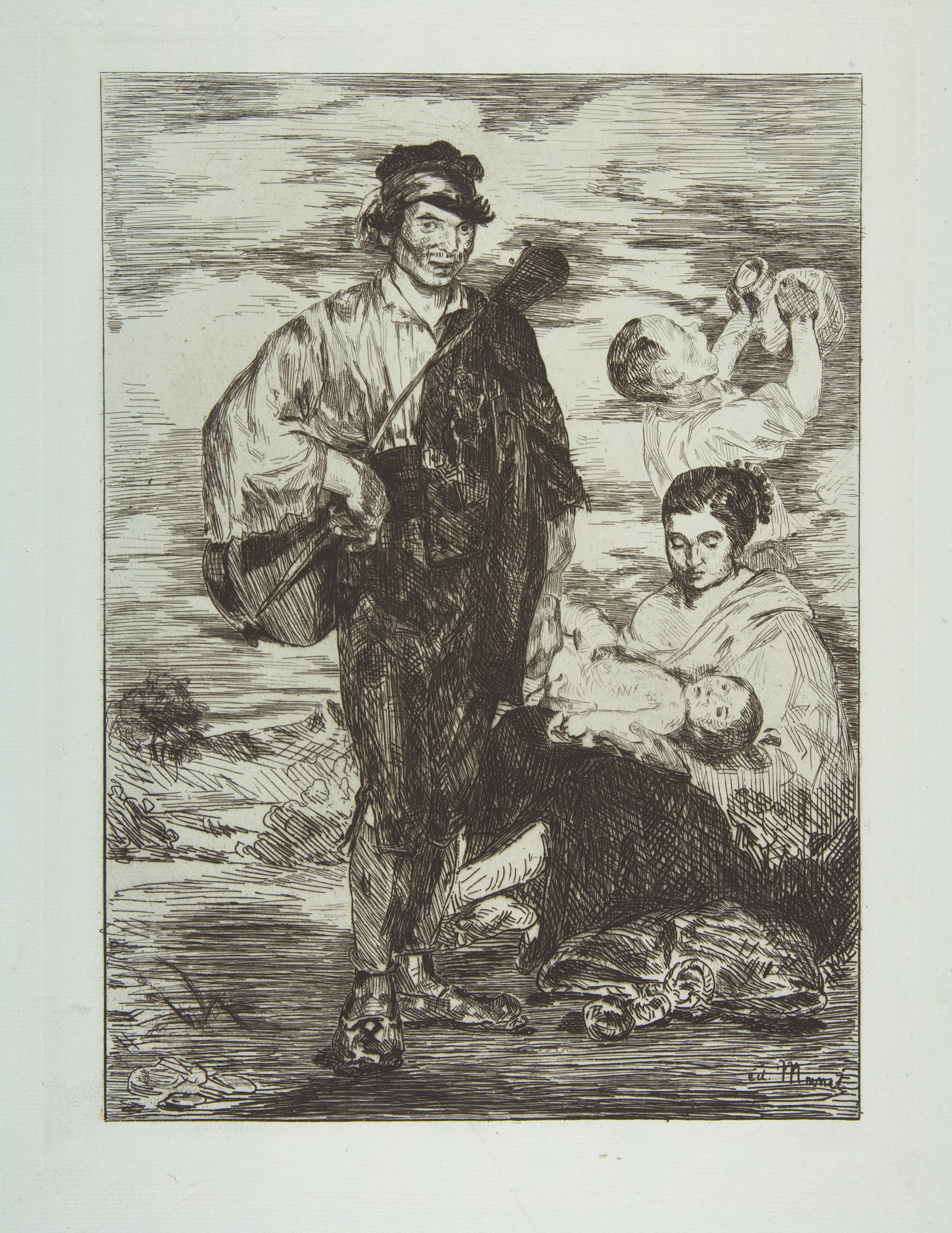
The Gypsies, an 1862 print by Édouard Manet

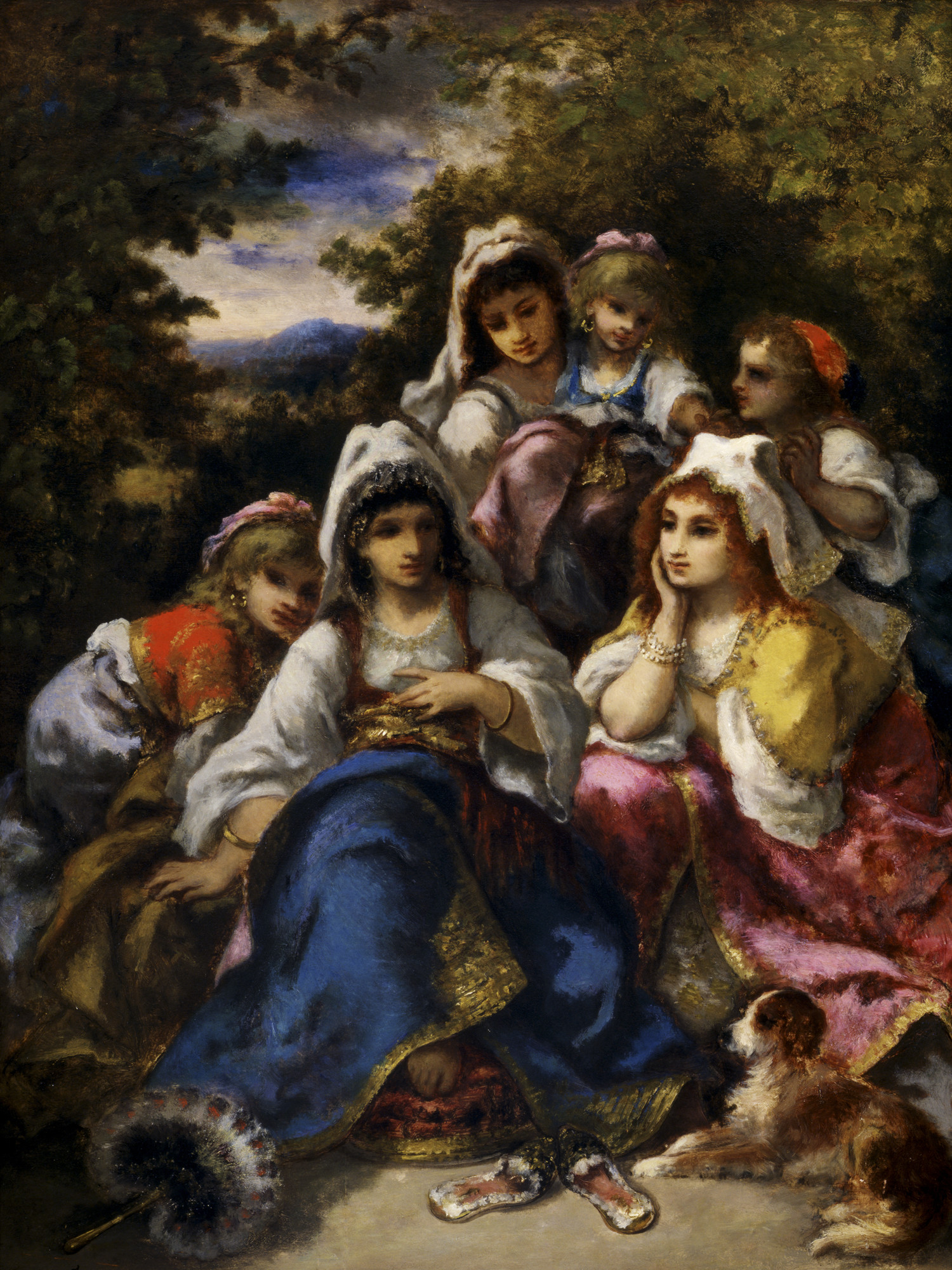
The Gypsy Princesses, a painting by Narcisse Virgilio Díaz, c. 1865-1870

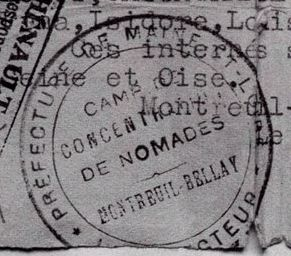
A seal on a document on the Montreuil-Bellay "nomad concentration camp" (1943).

== Repatriations ==
In 2010 and 2011, the French government organized repatriation flights to send Romanian Romanis to Romania. On 12 April, a chartered flight carrying 160 Romani left northern France for Timișoara. As in the 2010 deportations, the French government gave those Romani leaving France €300 each, with €100 for each child. The Romani on the 12 April flight were forced to sign declarations that they would never return to France.

On 9 August, the city of Marseille in southern France forcibly evicted 100 Romani people from a makeshift camp near Porte d'Aix, giving them 24 hours to leave. A chartered flight carrying approximately 150 Romani to Romania left the Lyon area on 20 September. France's goal for 2011 was to deport 30,000 Romani to Romania. As of 2012, France sent about 8,000 Romani to Romania and Bulgaria in 2011, after dismantling camps where they were living on the outskirts of cities. The actions prompted controversy and calls for greater inclusion of Romani people.

== Racism ==
Prejudiced views of Romani are widespread in France, with a 2014 Pew Research poll indicating that two-thirds of French people have unfavorable views of Romani. In 2016, more than 10,000 Roma were evicted by French authorities. According to a report published by the Human Rights League of France and the European Roma Rights Centre, 60 percent of all Romani living in France were forcibly evicted from their homes in 2016, many in cold winter months.

Rumors and fake news stories of a white van occupied by Romani attempting to abduct children or young women have spread across the French internet on multiple occasions. A number of violent incidents against Romani occurred in March 2019 after rumors of Romani kidnapping children spread on Facebook and Snapchat. Two people in a white van were attacked by 20 youths in Colombes on 16 March. On 25 March, 50 people attacked a Roma camp in Bobigny with sticks and knives, burning several vans, and a separate group of Romani were chased and attacked in Clichy-sous-Bois. Similar incidents occurred in Aubervilliers, Bondy and Noisy-le-Sec.

== See also ==
- Cascarots, a group of Romani in the Basque Country
- Erromintxela, a group of Romani in the Basque Country with their own language
- Gypsy jazz § France
- Romani people in Algeria
- The Holocaust in France
