= Manouche =

Romani subgroup

The Manouche (/məˈnuːʃ/ mə-NOOSH) are a Romani subgroup who have lived in France and Switzerland since at least the 18th century. The term Manouche is the self-ascribed name of the French Sinti.

== Etymology ==
The word manouche (or manuś [maˈnuʃ]) means 'human being' in the Romani language, and is derived from Sanskrit मनुष्य (manuṣya); close cognates are found in several modern Indian languages. Their Romani dialect, cognate to the one used by German Sinti, exhibits strong German influence. They are now primarily French-speaking, though the dialect of French they use exhibits many linguistic peculiarities compared to standard French.

== Persecution in Switzerland ==
From 1926 to 1973, Swiss children's charity Pro Juventute—with the support of Swiss authorities—forcibly removed Manouche, Sinti, and Yenish children from their families and placed them in foster homes, adoptive families and correctional institutions through the Kinder der Landstrasse ('Children of the Open Road') project. This was part of a wider effort to forcibly assimilate these traditionally nomadic communities into the sedentary Swiss society.

In February 2025, the Swiss government formally acknowledged that the forced removals and assimilation efforts constitute a crime against humanity under international law.

== Notable Manouches ==
- Django Reinhardt
- Raymond Gurême

== See also ==
- Jazz manouche
