= Sinti =

Romani subgroup

Total population
- ≈ 500,000 (2011)

Regions with significant populations
- Slovakia: 100–1000
- Germany: 60,000-140,000

Languages
- Sinte Romani

Religion
- Christianity

Related ethnic groups
- Other Indo-Aryan peoples, especially Roma (Manouche)

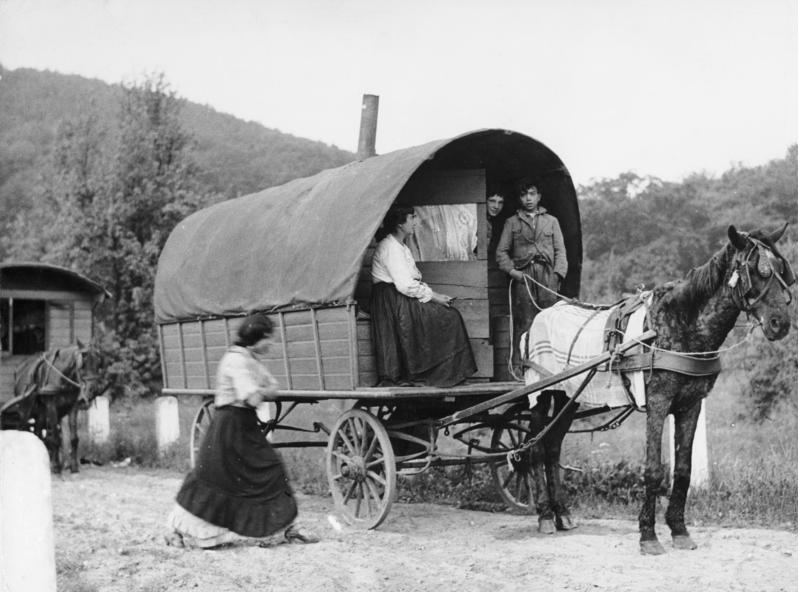
Sinti people in Rhine Province, Germany, 1935

The Sinti (masc. sing. Sinto; fem. sing. Sintetsa, Sinta) are a subgroup of the Romani people. They are found mostly in Germany, France, Italy and Central Europe, numbering some 200,000 people. (Note: "Individual groups can be classified into major metagroups: the Roma of East European extraction; the Sinti in Germany and Manouches in France and Catalonia; the Kaló in Spain, Ciganos in Portugal and Gitans of southern France; and the Romanichals of Britain." – Kalaydjieva, Gresham, & Calarell 2001) They were traditionally itinerant, but today only a small percentage of Sinti remain unsettled. In earlier times, they frequently lived on the outskirts of communities.

Within the Sinti Community are various tribes such as the Manouche in France. They speak the Sinti-Manouche variety of Romani, which exhibits strong German influence.

== Etymology and origin ==
The origin of the Sinti people, like that of the broader Romani people, lies generally in the Indian subcontinent. (Note: "The ancestors of today's 12 to 15 million Roma came from India about 1,000 years ago, and their descendants eventually migrated to six continents. The Romanic language is most closely related to Punjabi and Hindi and is still spoken by millions of Roma and Sinti (Romani people of Central Europe)." – Sturman 2019) A 2012 study by Estonian and Indian researchers found genetic similarities between European Romani men and Indian men in their sample.

While people from the western Indian subcontinent's Sindh region were mentioned in 1100 by Ahmad ibn Muhammad al-Maydani, it is unclear whether the Sindhi people were the ancestors of modern Sinti, though it is clear that Sinti and other Romani people originated in the northern Indian subcontinent.

The origin of the name is disputed. (Note: "Already in 18th and 19th century scholarly discussions, the name 'Sinti' was associated occasionally with that of the Indian province of Sindh. There is, in fact, no connection at all. The word 'Sinti' has the inflection typical of a European loanword in Romani, and cannot have been part of the original Indian vocabulary of the language. The fact that it is found solely among Romani speakers in Germany and neighboring regions and only more recent sources, suggests that it is a later borrowing into this specific dialect of Romanic, and was not part of the language in pre-European times. " – Stauber & Vago 2007) Scholar Jan Kochanowski, and many Sinti themselves, believe it derives from Sindhi, the name of the people of Sindh in medieval India (a region now in southeast Pakistan). Romani Historian Ian Hancock states that the connection between Sinti and Sindhi is not tenable on linguistic grounds and that in the earliest samples of Sinte Romani, the endonym of Kale was used instead.

Scholar Yaron Matras argued that Sinti is a later term in use by the Sinti from only the 18th century on, and is likely a European loanword. (Note: "[U]p to the late 18th century the Sinti referred to themselves as 'Kale' (lit. 'blacks'). The term 'Sinti' or 'Sinte' (see below) may be found in 18th and 19th century linguistic documentation alongside 'Kale,' and appears to have been borrowed from the secret vocabulary of the Yenish travelers, perhaps because of its usefulness in concealing ethnic identity. Only toward the late 19th century does the self-appellation 'Sinti' replace 'Kale' entirely in Germany." – Margalit & Matras 2007) This view is shared by Romani linguist Ronald Lee, who stated the name's origin probably lies in the German word Reisende, meaning 'travellers'.

== History ==
The Sinti arrived in Austria and Germany in the Late Middle Ages as part of the emigration from the Indian subcontinent, eventually splitting into two groups: Eftavagarja ("the Seven Caravans") and Estraxarja ("from Austria"). They arrived in Germany before 1540. The two groups expanded, the Eftavagarja into France and Portugal, where they are called "Manouches", and to the Balkans, where they are called "Ciganos" (from Byzantine Greek "τσιγγάνος" and "Ἀτσίγγανος", deriving from Ancient Greek "ἀθίγγανος", meaning "untouchable" (Note: The dictionary definition of τσιγγάνος at Wiktionary) (Note: The dictionary definition of Cigan at Wiktionary)); and the Estraxarja into Italy and Central Europe, mainly what are now Croatia, Slovenia, Hungary, Romania, the Czech Republic and Slovakia, eventually adopting various regional names.

From 1926 to 1973, Pro Juventute, a Swiss children's charity, with the support of Swiss authorities, committed crimes against humanity against the Yenish, Manouche, and Sinti people in Switzerland by forcibly removing children from their families and placing them in foster homes, adoptive families, and correctional institutions through the Kinder der Landstrasse (Children of the Open Road) project. This was part of a wider effort to forcibly assimilate these traditionally nomadic communities into the sedentary Swiss society. In February 2025, the Swiss government formally acknowledged that the forced removals and assimilation efforts constitute a crime against humanity under international law.

The traditional occupations of the Sinti people include musicians, gardeners, waiters, iron pickers, and mechanics. Music plays a significant role in shaping Sinti identity.

Before the Holocaust, a lot of Sinti people made extra money by being skilled musicians. Sinti became professional musicians, and some of them even got jobs playing for rich nobles and performing in concert halls all over Europe. Starting in the 1800s, Roma and Sinti people began getting professional music training at music schools, conservatories, and universities.

=== The Holocaust ===
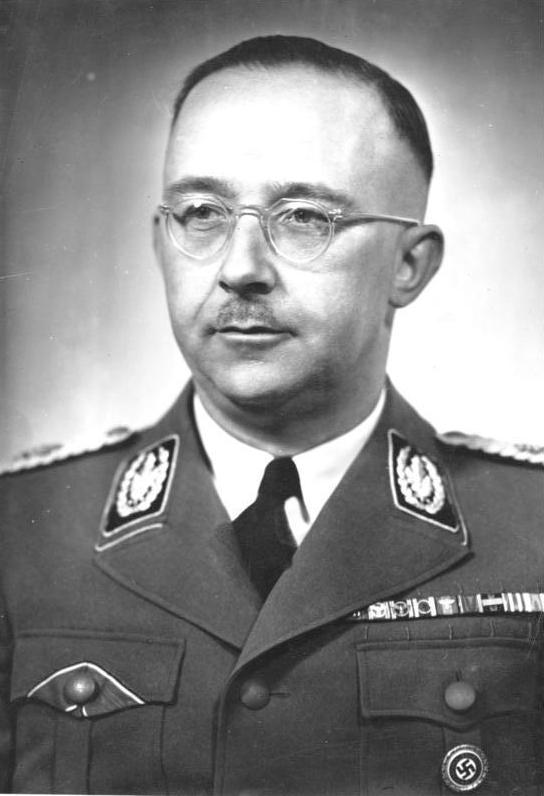
The genocide of the Sinti was carried out under the authority of German political leader Heinrich Himmler.

The Sinti migrated to Germany in the early 15th century. Despite their long presence, they were still generally regarded as beggars and thieves, and, by 1899, the police kept a central register on Sinti, Roma, and Yenish peoples. Nazi Germany considered them racially inferior (see Nazism and race), and persecuted them throughout Germany during the Nazi period – the Nuremberg Laws of 1935 applying to them as well as the Jews. From 1935, Sinti found themselves interned in Zigeunerlager ("Gypsy camps").

Adolf Eichmann recommended that Nazi Germany solve the "Gypsy Question" simultaneously with the Jewish Question, resulting in the deportation of the Sinti to clear room to build homes for ethnic Germans. Some were sent to the territory of Poland, or elsewhere, including some deported to the territory of Yugoslavia by the Hamburg Police in 1939. Others were confined to designated areas, and many were eventually murdered in gas chambers. Many Sinti and Roma were taken to Auschwitz-Birkenau, where they were put in a special section, called the "gypsy camp". Josef Mengele often performed some of his infamous experiments on Sinti and Roma. On 2 August 1944, the "gypsy camp" was closed, and approximately 4,000 Sinti and Roma were gassed during the night of 2–3 August and burnt in the crematoria. The date 2 August is commemorated as Roma and Sinti Holocaust Remembrance Day.

In December 1938, SS Leader and German Police Chief Heinrich Himmler issued a new decree concerning the Roma and Sinti, titled “Combating the Gypsy Plague.” The decree emphasized that the regime’s policies against the Romani people should be primarily based on racial grounds. This directive represented a significant change in Nazi policy toward the Roma and Sinti. Himmler instructed the police to register all Roma and Sinti residing in Nazi Germany and to classify them according to race. He also mandated the physical separation of Roma and Sinti from so-called “Aryan” Germans. This decree laid the groundwork for the Nazi regime’s anti-Romani measures during World War II, which included segregation, deportation, and mass extermination.

The Nazi regime viewed Sinti people as inherently criminal, believing they were born with criminal tendencies. Prior to the Nazi genocide, Sinti individuals were frequently blamed for crimes like pickpocketing, theft, robbery, and even witchcraft and black magic, leading to a widespread fear of Roma and Sinti within German society.

The Nazi regime systematically deported Roma and Sinti beggars, including those engaged in street begging, to extermination camps, while simultaneously characterizing the Sinti population as inherently indolent, primitive, workshy and resistant to employment. Robert Ritter was a Nazi racial researcher who labeled the Sinti and Roma communities as a "primitive" race and unable to adapt socially, using this classification to justify their persecution and extermination. The Nazis aimed to eradicate the Sinti people, accusing them of being lazy, unwilling to work, and prone to begging. Eva Justin, a researcher who studied Sinti children, described them as worthless, racially inferior, and lacking abilities except for musical talent. She later played a role in arranging the deportation of Sinti children to Auschwitz.

In the concentration camps, the Sinti were forced to wear either a black triangle, indicating their classification as "asocial", or a brown triangle, specifically reserved for Sinti, Roma, and Yenish peoples.

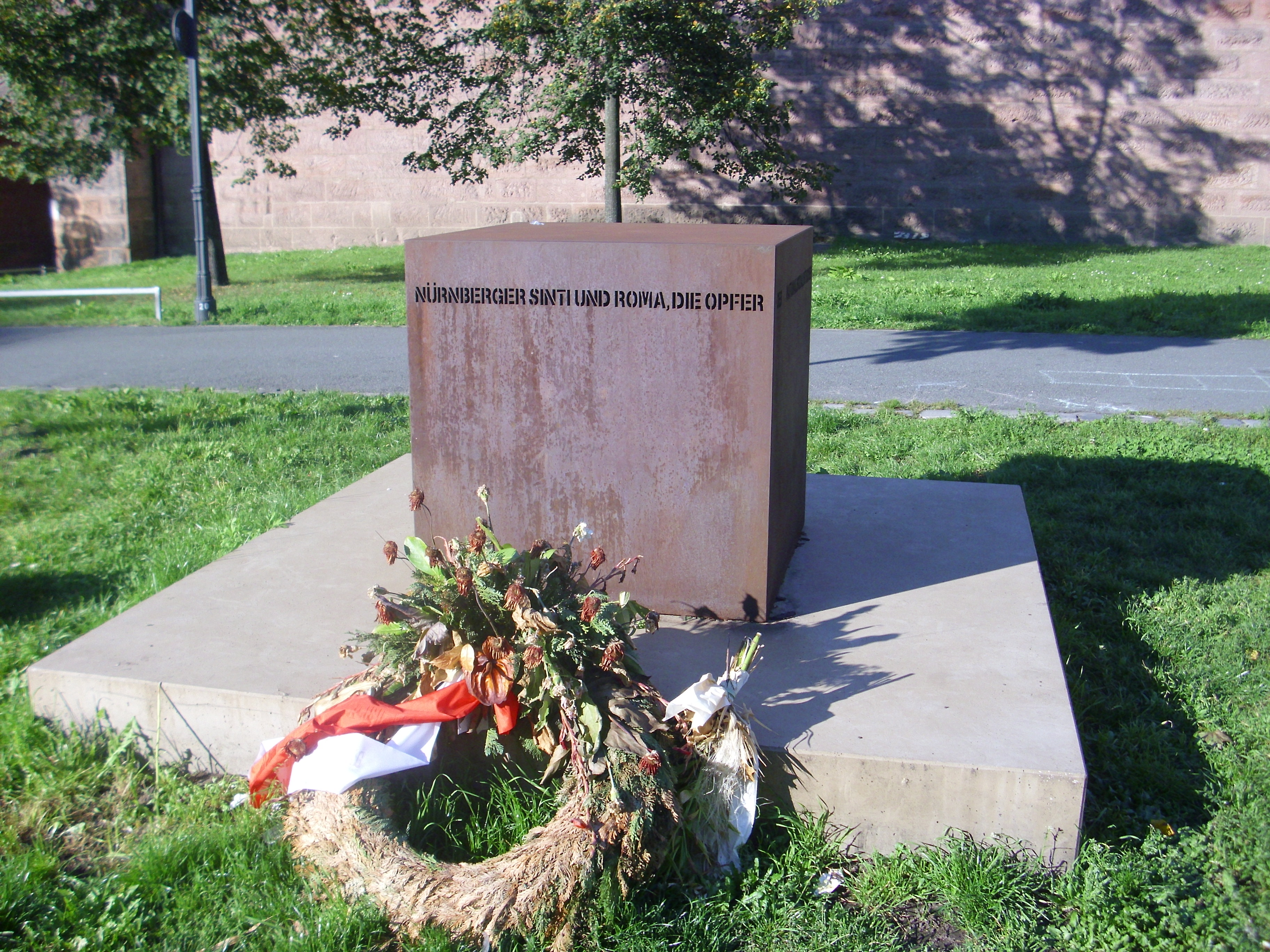
Memorial in Nuremberg opposite Frauentorgraben 49, where on 15 September 1935 the Nuremberg Laws were adopted in the ballroom of the Industrial & Cultural Association clubhouse

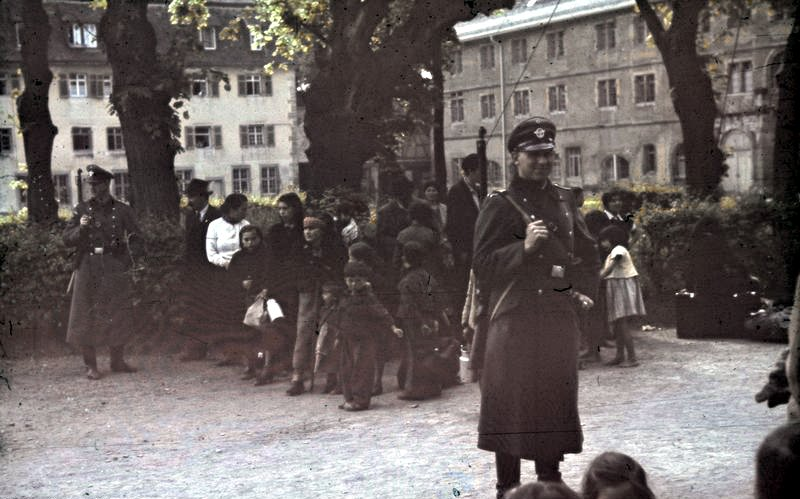
Deportation of Sinti and Roma in Asperg, 22 May 1940

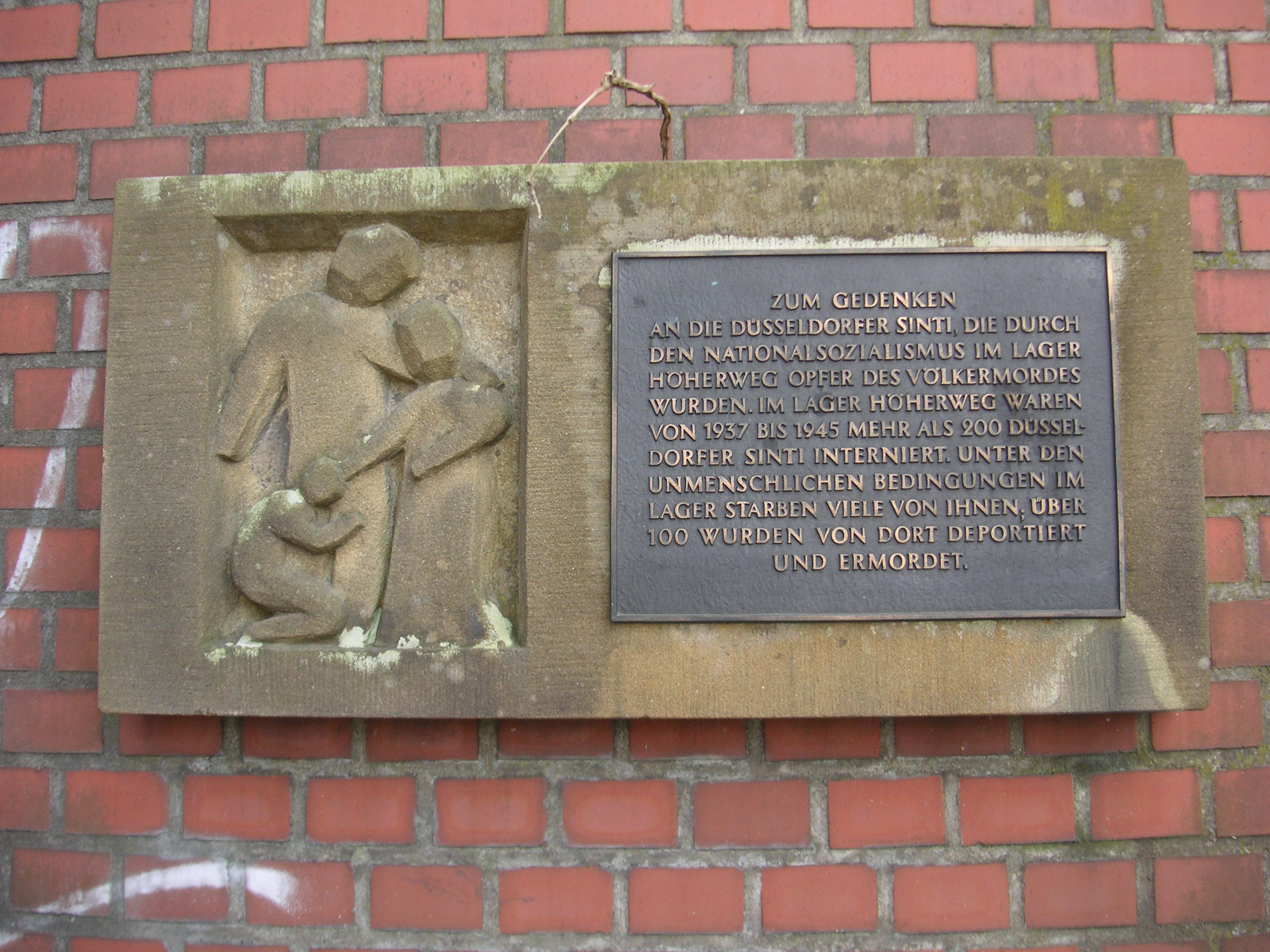
Memorial for murdered Sinti in Düsseldorf-Lierenfeld

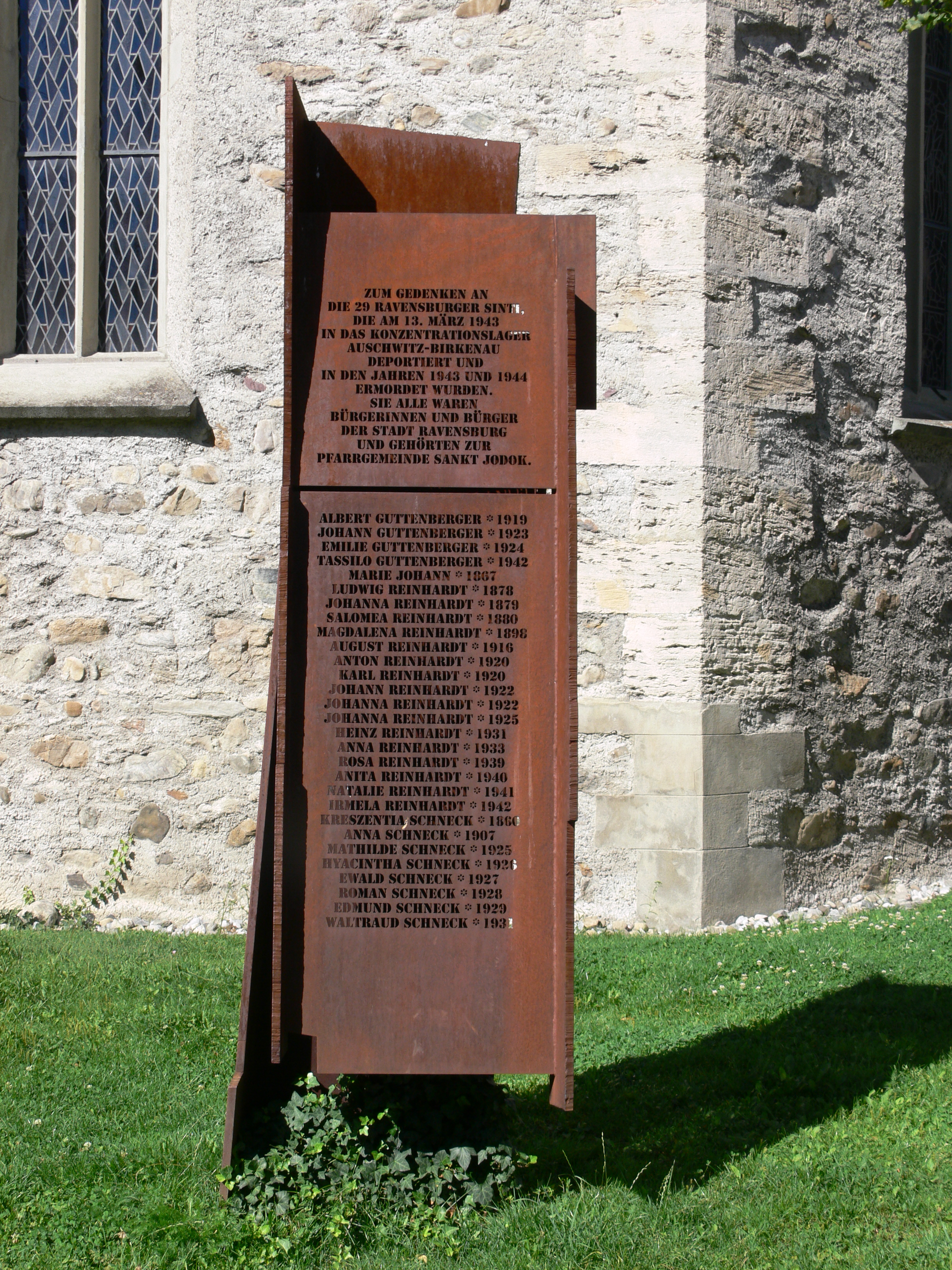
Ravensburg, Memorial for Sinti murdered in Auschwitz

== Culture ==
A well-known dish among the Sinti is hedgehog stew, which is prepared using hedgehog meat. Gypsy jazz is a style of jazz music that is popular with the Sinti people.

== Notable people ==
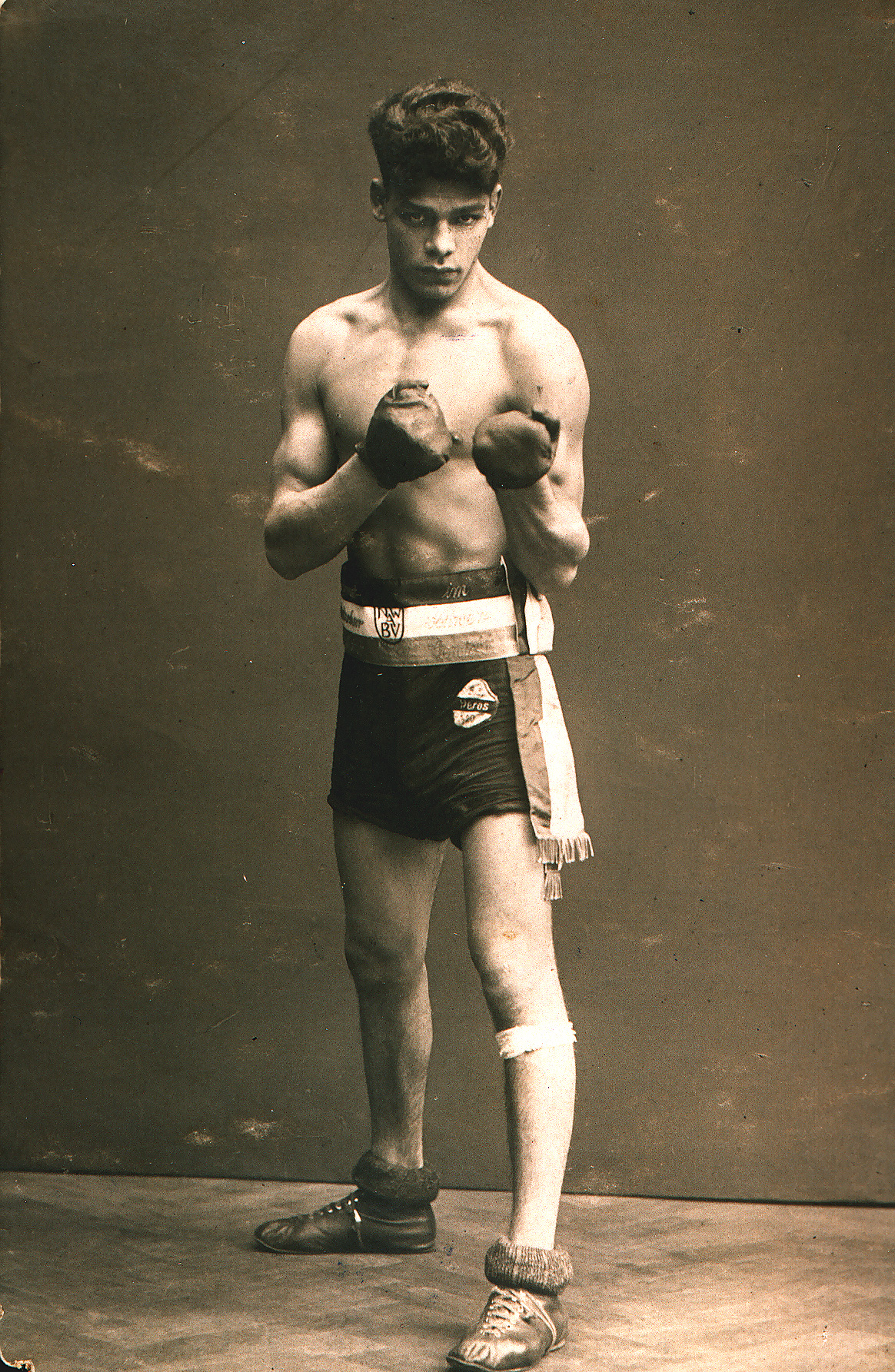
Johann Trollmann, a German Sinti boxer, 1928

- Anita Awosusi (born 1956), writer, musician, activist
- Tayo Awosusi-Onutor (born 1978), singer-songwriter, author, activist
- Ayo (born 1980), singer, songwriter and actress
- Wawau Adler (born 1967), jazz guitarist
- Jakob Bamberger (1913–1989), boxer and activist
- Drafi Deutscher (1946–2006), singer and songwriter
- Lily Franz (1924–2011), writer and Holocaust survivor
- Philomena Franz (1922–2022), writer and Holocaust survivor
- Raymond Gurême (1925–2020), acrobat, activist, and holocaust survivor
- Elisabeth Guttenberger (1926–2024), activist and Holocaust survivor
- Hugo Höllenreiner (1933–2015), Holocaust survivor and public speaker
- Mario Mettbach (1952–2021/22), politician
- Oto Pestner (born 1956), singer, songwriter and politician
- Schnuckenack Reinhardt (1921–2006), jazz musician
- Marianne Rosenberg (born 1955), singer and daughter of Otto Rosenberg
- Otto Rosenberg (1927–2001), writer, activist and Holocaust survivor
- Sido (born 1980), rapper
- Chrissy Teigen (b. 1985), model
- Johann Trollmann (1907–1944), boxer and victim of forced sterilisation
- Häns'che Weiss (1951–2016), jazz musician

== See also ==
- Antiziganism
- History of the Romani people
- Romani people by country
- Romani people in Austria
- Romani people in Belgium
- Romani people in Germany
- Romani people in the Netherlands
- Sindhi diaspora
- Sinte Romani (language)
