= Romani Rose =

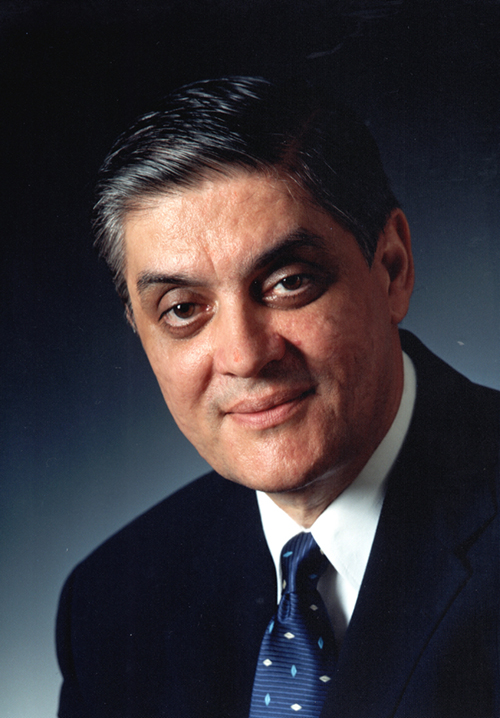
Romani Rose

Romani Rose (born 1946 at Heidelberg, Germany) is a Romany activist and head of the Central Council of German Sinti and Roma. He lost 13 relatives in the Holocaust.

== Career ==
Rose was also one of the driving forces behind the Memorial to the Sinti and Roma Victims of National Socialism in Berlin.

== Other activities ==
- German Institute for Human Rights (DIMR), Member of the Board of Trustees
- Culture Foundation of the German Football Association (DFB), Member of the Board of Trustees
- Federal Anti-Discrimination Agency (ADS), Member of the Advisory Board
- Manfred Lautenschläger Foundation, Member of the Board of Trustees
- Munich Documentation Centre for the History of National Socialism, Member of the Board of Trustees
