= Central Council of German Sinti and Roma =

Human rights organisation based in Germany

The Central Council of German Sinti and Roma (German: Zentralrat Deutscher Sinti und Roma) is a German Romani rights group based in Heidelberg, Germany. It is headed by Romani Rose, who lost 13 members of his close family in the Romani Holocaust. The organization is a member of the Federal Union of European Nationalities.

== Description ==
The Central Council was founded in 1982. It is the union of the umbrella organisations of the four national autochthonous minorities which belong to the German nation and have always been resident and here: The Domowina of the Sorbs, the Friesian Council, the South Schleswig Association of the Danish minority and the Central Council of German Sinti and Roma. Along with delegates of minorities from the United States, Mexico, Argentina, Japan, India, Sri Lanka, France and the Netherlands Rose is also a member of the management committee of the International Movement Against Discrimination and Racism (IMADR) founded in Tokyo in 1988.

Since June 1979 to be more exact, Romani Rose has led the work for the civil rights of German Sinti and Roma before the eyes of the German as well as the international public; he has also fought for their protection from racism and discrimination and for compensation for the survivors of the Holocaust, at the same time announcing the magnitude and the historical importance of the genocide of 500,000 Sinti and Roma in National Socialist occupied Europe. In May 1995, in cooperation with the member organisations of the Central Council, Rose achieved recognition for German Sinti and Roma as a national minority in Germany with their own minority language, connected with their goal of equal participation in social and political life.

== Civil rights work ==
The first important steps of this civil rights work include:

- the hunger strike by 12 Sinti in the former Dachau concentration camp on Easter 1980, organised and participated in by Rose, to get international attention for the genocide and to protest against the continued use of "Gypsy-Race"-files of the Reichs Security Main Office by German police and other authorities decades after the end of the war;
- the Central Council of German Sinti and Roma, co-founded on 6 February 1982 by Rose and since then led by him, and until the year 2000 the only and until today the most influential umbrella organisation of state and regional associations of German Sinti and Roma;
- the delegation of German Sinti and Roma led by Rose to meet the former Chancellor of Germany Helmut Schmidt, who proclaimed the historically important and internationally binding recognition of the National Socialist crimes against Sinti and Roma as genocide determined by their so-called "Rasse" (race).

== See also ==
- Documentation and Cultural Centre of German Sinti and Roma
- European Civil Rights Prize of the Sinti and Roma
- European Roma Rights Centre
