= Deportation of Roma migrants from France =

Deportation of Romanian and Bulgarian Roma from France, 2009–2010

- Date: 2009 to 2013
- Location: France
- Type: Deportation, crackdown
- Cause: Romani slums and shanty towns popping up across France
- Motive: The deportation of Romani people back to their countries of origin
- Target: Romani people in France, Romani people of Romanian origin, Romani people of Bulgarian origin
- Perpetrator: Government of France
- Participants: French police
- Outcome: Around 37,300 Romani people deported between 2009 and 2013 (Note: 10,000 deported to Romanian and Bulgaria in 2009, 8,300 deported between January and August 2010, 8,000 deported in 2011, unknown deported in 2012 and around 11,000 of Romanian origin deported in 2013); 51 Roma camps demolished between July and September 2010; Riots against deportation by Romani people
- Deaths: 2 killed by French police

The deportation of Roma migrants from France was subject of intense political debate in France and internationally in 2009 and 2010. After two fatal incidents, President of France Nicolas Sarkozy vowed in July 2010 to evict at least half of the 539 Roma squatting in land camps. The Government of France initiated a program to repatriate thousands of Romanian and Bulgarian Roma, as part of the crackdown. Between July and September 2010, at least 51 Roma camps were demolished, and France has repatriated at least 1,230 Roma to Romania and Bulgaria.

The deportations proved controversial in the European Union (EU), with EU Justice Commissioner Viviane Reding stating in a September 2010 briefing that the European Commission might take legal action against the French government over the forced expulsions, calling them "a disgrace". The subsequent row over the comments was widely reported to have overshadowed an EU summit in September 2010. France continued to deport Roma in 2011. According to the BBC, France had deported almost 11,000 Romani people of Romanian origin in 2013.

== Background ==
In the 1960s, there were 75,000 people living in slums in France, mainly Algerian migrants. Many were eventually rehoused in banlieues, suburbs of major cities. Slums however began to grow again in the 1990s, when migrants from Eastern Europe arrived. At first, these migrants were seen as refugees, but successive legal measures restricted their rights to housing, work and social benefits. This then meant that although Bulgarian and Romanian citizens have the right to enter France without a visa because their countries of origin are in the European Union, under special French immigration regulations, they must have work or residency permits if they wish to stay longer than three months.

This forced the now undocumented migrants to squat land and build shanty towns. In 2012, the state recorded 16,399 people living in 391 slums across France. Of these, 82% were Romanian and 6% Bulgarian. In consequence, East European migrants who squat are typically regarded as Roma migrants, whether or not they are actually Romani. Nomadic people, who may or may not be Romani, are termed 'travellers' ("Gens du voyage"). A recent law compels local municipalities to provide a camp for these travellers.

On 16 July 2010, French police shot and killed Luigi Duquenet, a 22-year-old French Romani man who drove through a police checkpoint. In retaliation, a group of around 50 people variously identified as Roma or travellers rioted in the small village of Saint-Aignan, attacking the police station with axes and iron bars. The local mayor described the disturbances as "a settling of scores between the travellers and the gendarmerie". On the same night and for a few nights thereafter, riots erupted in a Grenoble neighborhood after French police shot and killed 27-year-old Karim Boudouda following a car chase. Boudouda was alleged to have been involved in a robbery at a casino near Grenoble and prosecutor Jean Philippe claimed the police acted in self defence after being fired on three times.

On 30 July 2010, the French President, Nicolas Sarkozy, made a speech in Grenoble concerning the recent events, both there and at Saint-Aignan. He criticized demonstrations against the police that occurred in both cases after perpetrators were killed while committing criminal acts and wantonly endangering police officers' lives, and in this context he was reported as saying that 'he had asked the interior minister to "put an end to the wild squatting and camping of the Roma" as well as to prevent further destruction by the rioters in Grenoble. As president, he said, (he) could not accept the fact that there were 539 Romani camps in his country, and he promised that half of them would be gone within three months. The office of the president stated that local unauthorised camps were "sources of illegal trafficking, of profoundly shocking living standards, of exploitation of children for begging, of prostitution and crime". Der Spiegel deemed this to come amidst efforts by the President's allies aimed at "keeping the issue of domestic security high on the political agenda."

== Deportations ==
In 2009, France deported 10,000 Romani back to Romania and Bulgaria. The next year, at least another 8,300 Romani were deported up until August. Between July and September 2010, at least 51 Romani camps were demolished, and France expelled at least 1,230 non-French Romani (conflating those French Romani involved in disturbances at Saint-Aignan with Bulgarian and Romanian citizens being expelled for otherwise unrelated alleged visa irregularities). The state provided both financial incentives (€300 in cash per person with €100 for each child) and special flights back to Romania and Bulgaria.

The French government claimed it was expelling people on legal rather than ethnic grounds, but the order mentioned Romani camps specifically ("en priorité ceux des Roms"). Sarkozy stated that his government had been unaware of the directive in question, which had been signed by Mr Michel Bart, the Chief of Staff of the French Minister of the Interior. Sarkozy claimed the directive had been cancelled as soon as the government became aware of it through press reports. He stated that France welcomes refugees and that "we refuse the creation of slums... that are unworthy of French Republic or European ideals." Sarkozy also stated that 80% of people removed from the camps during August 2010 were travellers of French origin.

== International reaction ==
=== Barroso ===
The president of the European Commission José Manuel Barroso gave a speech widely interpreted as a criticism of the French policy on 6 September 2010. He warned EU governments to "steer clear of racism and xenophobia". On 9 September 2010, the European Parliament expressed deep concern at measures taken by the French authorities and criticised the Council of the European Union and European Commission's lack of commitment on the issue. In a resolution tabled by the Progressive Alliance of Socialists and Democrats, Group of the Alliance of Liberals and Democrats for Europe, The Greens–European Free Alliance and European United Left–Nordic Green Left groups and adopted by 337 votes to 245 with 51 abstentions, the Parliament said the member states in question should immediately "suspend all expulsions of Roma". The Parliament rejected "any statements which link minorities and immigration with criminality and create discriminatory stereotypes" and "the inflammatory and openly discriminatory rhetoric [...] lending credibility to racist statements and the actions of extreme right-wing groups".

=== Reding ===
Later in the week, EU Justice Commissioner Viviane Reding called the expulsions "a disgrace", stating in a briefing on 14 September 2010 that "This is a situation I had thought Europe would not have to witness again after the Second World War". She suggested the European Commission might take legal action against France over the matter. Her strong response was in part due to French denials of a leaked file dated 5 August, sent from the Interior Ministry to regional police chiefs, which included the instruction: "Three hundred camps or illegal settlements must be cleared within three months, Roma camps are a priority".

The dispute between the French government and the EU Commission was widely thought to have overshadowed the EU summit opening on 16 September 2010. Nicolas Sarkozy criticised Reding's remarks, saying "The disgusting and shameful words that were used – World War II, the evocation of the Jews – was something that shocked us deeply". Since Reding is a Luxembourger, Sarkozy told Luxembourg to take in France's unwanted Romani. He also affirmed that his government would continue with its policy.

According to Bulgarian prime minister Boyko Borisov, "There was a big argument — I could also say a scandal — between the president of the European Commission and the French president". In response to Mr Sarkozy's suggestion that Luxembourg could accommodate the expelled Romani, its Foreign Minister Jean Asselborn said he found the statement "malevolent". The German chancellor Angela Merkel was quoted as saying "I found the tone and especially the historical comparisons unsuitable. And I hope we can find a better way." At the meeting, President Barroso distanced himself from Reding's comments, but affirmed that "The prohibition of discrimination based on racial and ethnic origin is one of the EU's fundamental principles." Finland's foreign minister Alexander Stubb commented that the summit, which has an objective of presenting a unified foreign and economic policy, risked making the EU look hypocritical: "When we promote free trade, climate change and human rights around the world we need to have our own backyard in order." Also at the summit, Sarkozy stated that Germany too intended to initiate a programme of expulsing Romani, a claim flatly denied by Germany.

Viviane Reding subsequently privately recanted the historical comparison made in her initial statement. Her office apologized for the analogy. The European Commission declined to follow up on the earlier threat to sue France at the European Court of Justice, or to take other legal action on the Romani matter against France. The EU said it would seek to compel European Union countries to amend their national rules to the requirements of the European Union's free movement laws, but in so doing did not deny the unlawfulness of the French actions.

=== Other reactions ===
Romani NGOs in Turkey protested the French government and what they considered the European Union's weak response to the French government's decision on human rights grounds. Efkan Ozcimen, head of a Turkish NGO was quoted saying, "Unfortunately France is expelling Roman people while the same France and the EU advise other countries about human rights. As Romani living in Turkey, we all have equal rights and France should take the example of Turkey on human rights." Zoni Weisz, a Romani activist and Holocaust deportation escapee who addressed the German Bundestag's Holocaust Remembrance Day ceremony on 27 January 2011, praised Viviane Reding's 'clear words' in denouncing Romani expulsions. Hungarian MEP Lívia Járóka, the sole European Parliament member to have partly Romani heritage, described the root problem as "the failure of Roma integration in most member states in the last 20 years".

On 10 November 2011, the Council of Europe condemned the expulsions as "discriminatory" and "contrary to human dignity", publishing the decision by the European Committee of Social Rights on the complaint Centre on Housing Rights and Evictions (COHRE) v. France. The European Commission pressed the governments of the member states to put in place national strategies and concrete plans for the integration of Romani people and to report on their implementation annually. In August 2012 Viviane Reding put the action of the French socialist government of Jean-Marc Ayrault and his minister of the interior Manuel Valls under scrutiny regarding alleged expulsions of Romani people. The call resulted in a shift of policy by the French government confirmed in a Ministerial executive order signed by nine French Ministers and placing the focus of the action on the integration of the Romani as called for by the European Commission.

The Committee on the Elimination of Racial Discrimination criticised the crackdown and regretted the "significant resurgence" of racism and xenophobia.

== Purported database ==
Le Monde newspaper reported in 2010 that the French Office central de lutte contre la délinquance itinérante (OCLDI) held a database of French Romani known as the MENS database. The French authorities denied these claims. A formal complaint regarding this was made by lawyers representing four Romani rights groups.

Subsequent investigations were conducted both by the Commission nationale de l'informatique et des libertés (CNIL), an independent body that oversees data privacy, and by the internal auditing unit in charge of overseeing data files. Both inquiries concluded that no MENS database existed or had ever existed, and CNIL reported finding no file with ethnic information in a broader investigation of the police and gendarmerie systems.

== Later deportations ==
France continued to deport Romani in 2011. On 12 April 2011, a chartered flight carrying 160 Romani left northern France for Timișoara, Romania. As in the 2010 deportations, the French government gave those Romani leaving France €300 each, with €100 for each child. The Romani on the 12 April flight had each signed declarations that they would never return to France. On 9 August 2011, the city of Marseille in southern France forcibly evicted 100 Romani people from their makeshift camp near Porte d'Aix, giving them 24 hours to leave. A chartered flight carrying approximately 150 Romani to Romania left the Lyon area on 20 September. France's goal for 2011 was to deport 30,000 Romani to their home country. As of 2012, France had sent about 8,000 Romani back to Romania and Bulgaria in 2011 and the deportations again caused debate. There were still an estimated 15,000 Romani living across France.

According to the BBC, France had deported almost 11,000 Romani people of Romanian origin in 2013 alone which was more than any other immigrant group.

== See also ==
- Romani people in France
- Blond Angel case
- Crisis situations and unrest in Europe since 2000
- Dibrani case
- Environmental racism in Europe
- Migrants around Calais
