= Zoni Weisz =

Dutch Holocaust survivor (born 1937)

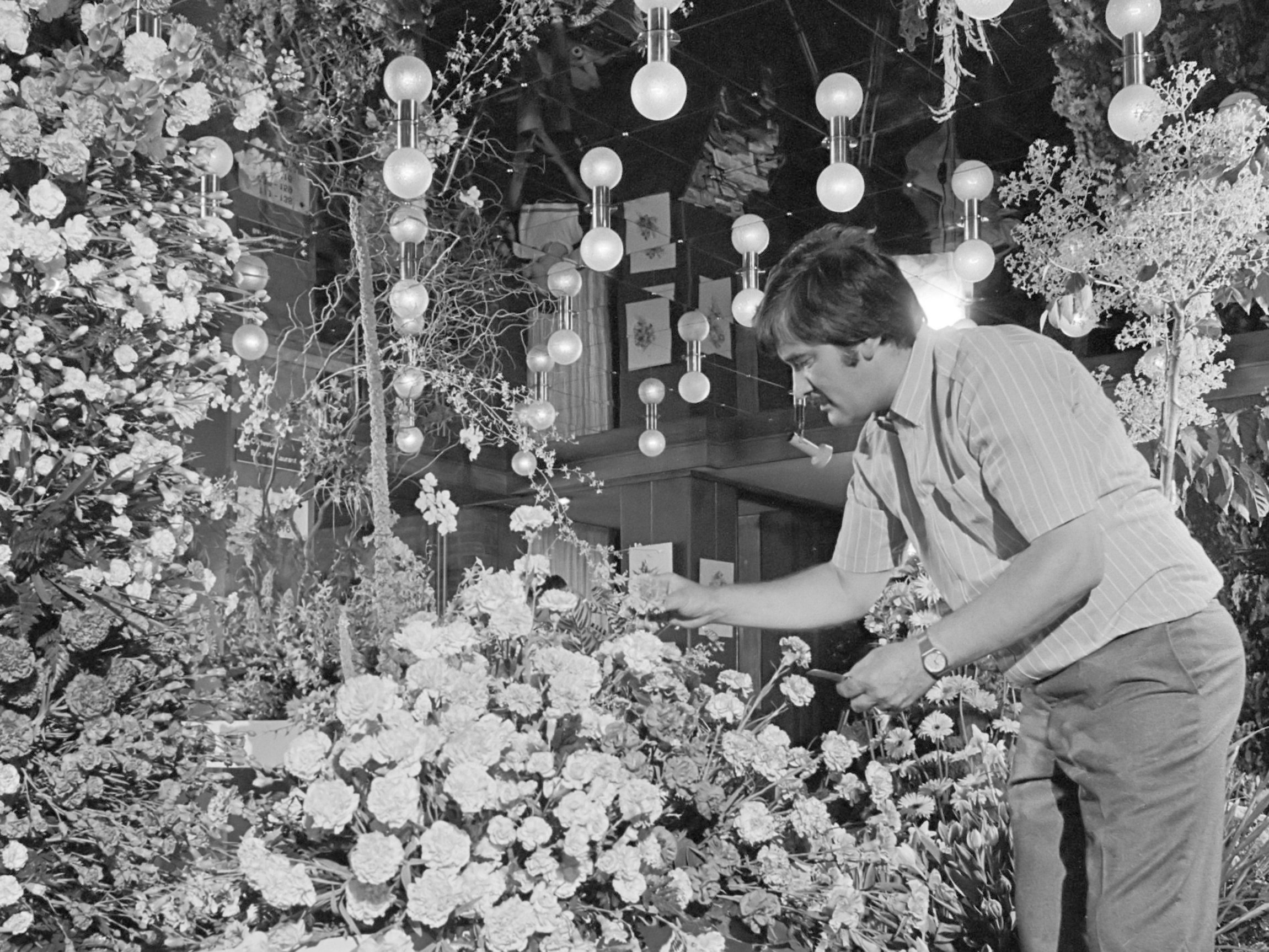
- Weisz arranging a flower display at the Sheraton Schiphol Hotel, 1983
- Born: Johan Weisz; March 4, 1937 (age 88); Den Haag
- Occupation: Florist
- Organization: International Auschwitz Committee
- Known for: Porajmos survivor
- Notable work: De vergeten Holocaust
- Parents: John (father); Jacoba (mother)
- Awards: Order of Orange-Nassau

Zoni Weisz (born Johan Weisz; 4 March 1937) is a Sinto Holocaust survivor from the Netherlands working in the Dutch floral industry.

Weisz was the oldest of four children of Jacoba and John Weisz from Zutphen, Netherlands. In May 1944, the family was ordered by the Nazis to be deported to the Westerbork transit camp with other Sinti and Roma during the Porajmos. Zoni made a brief escape with his aunt, but they were quickly found and arrested. They were then deported to the Auschwitz concentration camp.

The rest of his family were sent on a deportation train to Auschwitz, but a Dutch police officer and member of the Dutch resistance put Weisz on a separate train that allowed him to eventually escape to his grandparents' home for the remainder of the war. His mother and siblings were all killed at Auschwitz, while his father was killed at the Mittelbau-Dora camp.

After the war, Weisz returned to school and began to study horticulture during an internship at Het Loo Palace. After this training, he performed two years of military service in Suriname. Afterwards, he worked at a flower merchant in Amsterdam and studied landscape architecture and art history. In 1958, he took over this business and became a well-known florist, and was listed in the Guinness Book of World Records for having created the world's largest flower arrangement. He has created works for the Dutch royal family, including arrangements for the inauguration of Queen Beatrix and the wedding of Prince Willem-Alexander.

Weisz speaks regularly about his experience during the Holocaust. He is a member of the Dutch Auschwitz Committee and the International Auschwitz Committee. He was the keynote speaker at a 2007 United Nations exhibition, "The Holocaust Against the Roma and Sinti and present-day racism in Europe". On 27 January 2011, he was the first Roma or Sinti to address the German Bundestag at the official Holocaust Remembrance Day ceremony, speaking about the liberation of Auschwitz. In his speech Mr Weisz pleaded for better treatment of Roma in Europe and praised the "clear words" of European Commission Vice-President Viviane Reding in the defense of the rights of the Roma against the group expulsions from France in the summer of 2010.

Queen Beatrix appointed Weisz to Officer of the Order of Orange-Nassau for his commitment to the Sinti and Roma communities, and for his work in the Dutch floral industry.
