= Dibrani case =

The Dibrani case refers to the 'political turmoil' created in France in October 2013 by the arrest during a field trip of an illegal immigrant Roma schoolgirl, Leonarda Dibrani (aged 15), and the following expulsion to Kosovo of her family and herself. The media uproar and student demonstrations that followed were mainly due to their interpretation of the "circulaire" previously issued by the ministry of Internal Affairs, providing that illegal immigrant children should never be arrested while at school, of which a field trip could be considered as some sort of extension.

The indecisive response by French President François Hollande to the ensuing crisis has led to heavy criticism from all sides, including from his own Socialist Party, and is viewed as having further weakened his stance in front of the growing popular support for his minister of Internal Affairs, Manuel Valls.

On 22 October, Jean-François Copé, head of UMP (France's second party, after the Socialist Party) announced he would make a proposal before year end to alter the current French law dealing with jus soli. On the following day, Manuel Valls countered by announcing François Hollande's concern about the Dibrani case and his intention to change right of asylum regulations to avoid similar cases in future.

The replacement in April 2014 of Harlem Désir, former chairman of the French Socialist Party, by Jean-Christophe Cambadélis has been partly explained by his attitude during the Dibrani case when he voiced his hope that not only Leonarda but other members of her family would be allowed to come back to France.

== See also ==
- Deportation of Roma migrants from France
- The Blond Angel Case
