= Disappearance of Lisa Irwin =

Missing infant case (2011)

Lisa Irwin
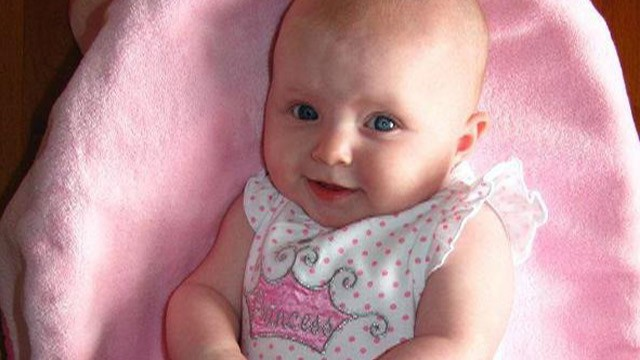
- Born: Lisa Renée Irwin; November 11, 2010; Independence, Missouri, U.S.
- Disappeared: October 4, 2011 (aged 10 months 23 days); Kansas City, Missouri, U.S.
- Status: Missing for 14 years, 7 months and 17 days
- Parent(s): Deborah Bradley and Jeremy Irwin

The disappearance of Lisa Renée Irwin was reported after it was discovered that she was missing from her home in Kansas City, Missouri, United States, in the early morning of October 4, 2011.

== Events ==
External images
- Irwin to three-years-old
- Age progression of Irwin to five-years-old
- Age progression of Irwin to seven-years-old

Deborah Bradley, Lisa's mother, said that Lisa's father, Jeremy Irwin, discovered her missing around 4:00 a.m. on Tuesday, October 4, 2011. According to Deborah, Lisa had been in her bed when she checked on her at 6:40 p.m. or at 10:40 p.m. Monday night, but when Jeremy came home from his late night job on Tuesday, he discovered "many of the home's lights were on, a window was open and the front door was unlocked". Later, the family told police that several cellphones were also missing.

During the subsequent investigation, two witnesses were discovered who claimed to have seen a man walking down the street with a baby. Police were able to find and question a man matching the description of one witness, but the other witness claimed that his photo did not match the man they saw.

On October 19, 2011, a search was performed of the Irwin home, and court documents showed that a cadaver dog turned up a scent of a dead body that might have been Lisa, near the mother's bed. Items removed from the home at the time the warrant was executed include a multicolor comforter, purple shorts, a multicolor Disney character shirt, a Glo Worm toy, a "Cars"-themed blanket, rolls of tape, and a tape dispenser.

During an interview with the Associated Press, Deborah said the police had accused her of being involved in Lisa's disappearance, telling her, "You did it. You did it. And we have nothing," and claimed that she had failed a lie detector test. Deborah and Jeremy announced the following week that they were organizing a reward in hopes that it would result in new information.

Jeremy Irwin appeared on the Today Show for an interview regarding the events, saying, "We just want to make sure that we tell everybody that we're still cooperating. We're still talking to the police. We're doing everything we can to try to find Lisa and bring her home." Bradley was also on the broadcast.

In October, the Irwin family reported that an anonymous benefactor had hired a private investigator and issued a $100,000 reward for Lisa's return.

In October 2011, Cyndy Short stopped representing the Irwin family, saying that she was unable to work with the family's other attorney, Joe Tacopina. Lisa's brothers had been scheduled for interviews and to collect DNA samples regarding the case, but their parents cancelled the night before, according to Tacopina, the family's attorney, and have allegedly denied investigators access to the boys. The boys had a second interview on November 10, 2011. A police request for a warrant claims that inconsistent stories from people involved may have hampered early stages of the investigation.

In May 2012, Deborah Bradley and Jeremy Irwin reported that their debit card had been fraudulently used on a website that provides false birth certificates. The Today Show and America Live both confirmed that the website existed. Their attorney also confirmed that he visited the website. Police have said they are continuing their investigation and they believe Irwin may still be alive.

In October 2013, a girl thought to be Lisa was discovered in a Romani camp in Greece. Authorities determined the girl was not Lisa.

In 2016, her case was profiled on the podcast The Vanished.

On November 24, 2020, the case was featured on the HLN series Real Life Nightmare in an episode called "Vanished from the Crib."

== See also ==
- List of people who disappeared mysteriously: post-1970
