= Office Central de Lutte contre la Délinquance Itinérante =

The Office central de lutte contre la délinquance itinérante (OCLDI; English: Central Office for Fighting against Mobile Organized Criminal Groups) is a service of the French National Gendarmerie. Its area of expertise is the fight against crime committed by itinerant criminals. It was established in 2004.
