= Equal Times =

- This is an advertisement for Equal Times. Retrieved from HERESIES Magazine (Vol. 3, No. 2, 1980)
- Editor: Eunice West
- First issue: 1976; 49 years ago
- Final issue: 1984; 41 years ago
- Country: United States
- Based in: Boston, Massachusetts
- OCLC: 15158516

Equal Times was an American feminist newspaper published in Boston, Chicago from 1976 until 1984. Often referred to as "Boston's newsweekly for women" and "Boston's Newspaper for Working Women," Equal Times primarily focused on issues related to equal pay and employment opportunities for women.

The newspaper faced criticism for its content, particularly for its focus on issues that only catered toward upper-class and middle-class white women. They have also been compared to other feminist periodicals, such as Sojourner and Majority Report.
