= Romani literature =

Body of literature by Romani people

Romani literature or Roma literature is literature by Romani people. It is composed of both written and oral literature. Authors may most likely reside in various countries throughout Europe, the Americas, and Africa and these continents have a long history of being home to Romani people. One aspect of Romani literature are testimonies by survivors of the Romani genocide, that emerged in the 1980s.

== Traits of Romani literature ==
Romani literature can't be defined simplistically as one large world wide, singular literature, but as a rhizome of smaller Romani literatures that combine to create what Romani literature is at large. There are many traits that are found in Romani literature that consist of but are not limited to: tendency to employ high levels of vernacular, high levels of dialogue, shared Roma traumatic experiences, emphasis on music and dance, and integration of the Romani language.

Romani literature is most uniquely characterized by its hybridization, in that the majority of Romani literature is written with a performative nature in mind. This is seen in the emphasis on music in dance in Romani literature, lending to the performative identity of Romani literature. Additionally, in the form of creative translations, there is an urge to re-create existing works with Romani performative ideas in mind, merging the aesthetics of Romani culture with the larger world of standard literature.

Romani literature also has tendencies to link together shared Romani traumas, with the most commonly seen of this being the Romani holocaust. Examples of this can be seen from authors such as Mateo Maximoff, who often referenced times of his in internment camps or Louise Doughty who places a family in the center of the holocaust in her novel Fires in the Dark.

== Early history ==
Romani literature originated in the late nineteenth to twentieth century, with the first comprehensive written text being a text in a 1867 Bulgarian newspaper, entitled "Letter to the Editor" . At this time, Roma in this region were called Egyptians, so the text was signed by "an Egyptian", although the author is now known as Iliya Naumchev. "Letter to the Editor" features many pleas for an "own state", and is recognized as part of a nascent Roma civic emancipation movement.

The first creative Romani writing is by Gina Ranjičić, a poet of whom no reliable biographical information is kept of. All known information of her was likely fabricated by Heinrich von Wlislocki, an author known for his plagiarism and falsification, although her work is still the earliest piece of Romani creative writing. Her writing came from the late nineteenth century, Wlislocki's history of her being written in 1892.

Romani literature boomed in the early stages of the U.S.S.R., with over 250 books being published in Romani between 1928-1938, with more books written by Roma authors not in Romani. This boom ended in 1938 when the Soviet Union shut down all Roma schools and Roma publications. During this time period the agreed upon progenitor of Romani literature, Alexander Germano, published most of his works, writing poetry, prose, dramaturgy, and journalism.

The slow and late occurrence of Romani literature can likely be attributed to the fact that Romani culture is traditionally oral. Before the twentieth century, writing was considered in most Romani societies as unacceptable. The most striking case of this is that of author Bronislawa Wajs, better known as Papusza, who was disregarded by her Romani society for publishing her works.

== Modern history ==
In 2010, the first Romani library in Serbia opened in Novi Sad.

== List of Romani authors ==
=== Austria ===
- Ceija Stojka

=== Bosnia and Herzegovina ===
- Muharem Serbezovski

=== Canada ===
- Ronald Lee

=== Czech Republic ===
- Andrej Giňa

=== Finland ===
- Veijo Baltzar
- Kiba Lumberg

=== France ===
- Matéo Maximoff
- Sandra Jayat

=== Germany ===
- Philomena Franz
- Otto Rosenberg

=== Hungary ===
- Menyhért Lakatos

=== Poland ===
- Bronisława Wajs

=== Serbia ===
- Vera Kurtić
- Jovan Nikolić

=== Slovakia ===
- Elena Lacková

=== Sweden ===
- Katarina Taikon

=== United Kingdom ===
- Tracey Ullman

=== United States ===
- Caren Gussoff
- Oksana Marafioti
- Seanan McGuire
- Hillary Monahan

== See also ==
- Romani studies
- Anti-Romani sentiment
- Category:Romani literature
- Category:Romani writers
