= Heather Connell =

American film director

Heather E. Connell
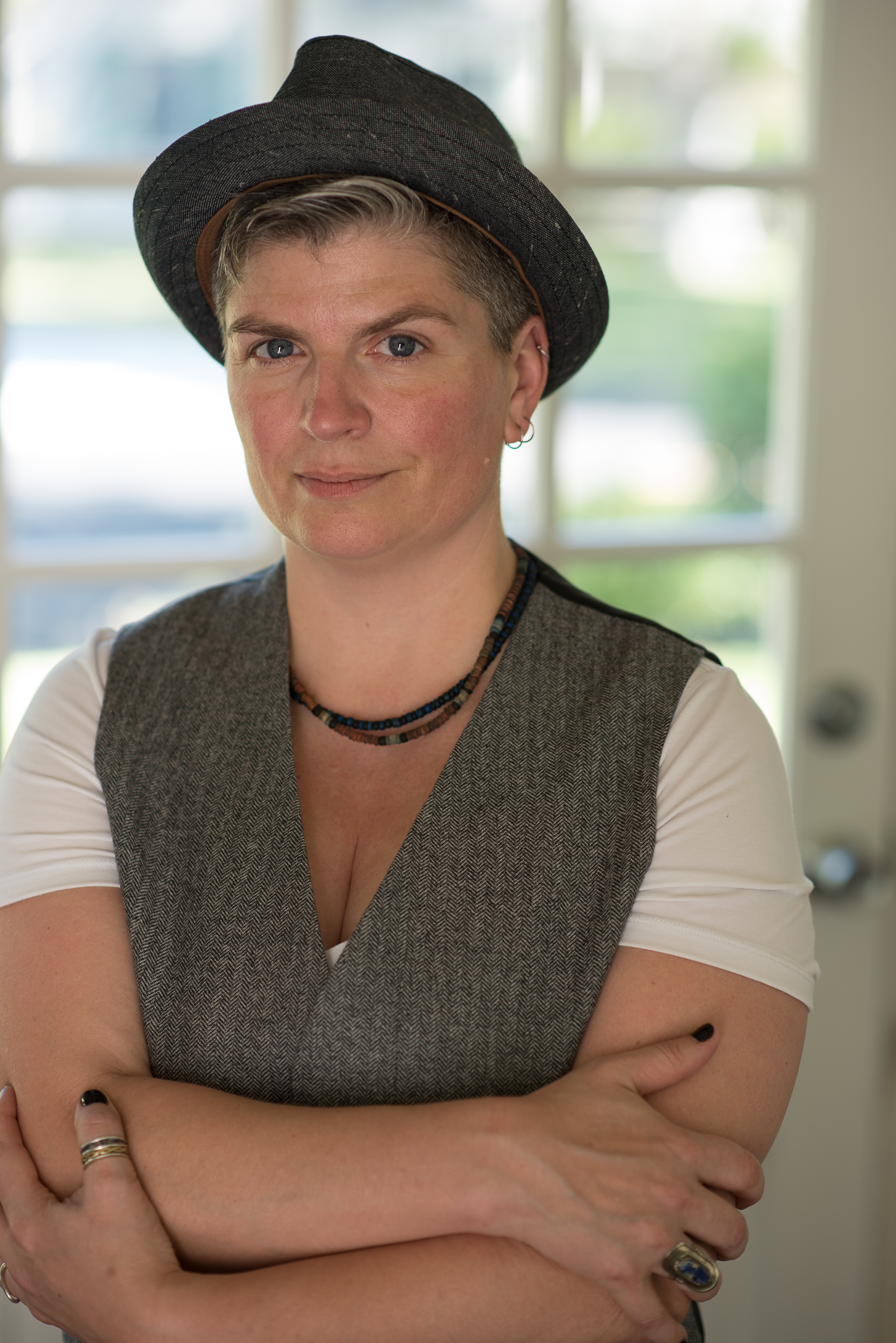
- Born: Heather E. Connell; Massachusetts, U.S.
- Education: Salem State University
- Occupation: Film director
- Notable work: Small Voices: The Stories of Cambodia's Children
- Website: displacedyankee.com

Heather E. Connell is an American film director. She is best known for directing the award-winning feature documentaries Small Voices: The Stories of Cambodia's Children (2008) and Forget Us Not (2013).

== Early life and education ==
Heather E. Connell was born and raised in Massachusetts. She attended Salem State University, where she studied screenwriting and theatre arts.

== Directing career ==
In 2001, Connell relocated to Los Angeles, where she founded Displaced Yankee Productions, an independent film company dedicated to using film as a platform for raising social awareness and activism through entertainment.

Shortly after moving to Los Angeles, Connell made the short film Choosing Your Course (2002). A couple of years later, she directed another short, titled Black/White (2004), which premiered at the Raleigh Studios in Hollywood.

In 2008, Connell wrote, directed and produced her first feature documentary Small Voices: The Stories of Cambodia's Children. Narrated by Connell's close friend, award-winning actress/director Megan Follows (Anne of Green Gables, Reign, Wynonna Earp ) Small Voices documents the struggles of several street children in Phnom Penh, Cambodia, many of whom live and work at the local garbage dump, on their journey to get an education. The documentary won several awards, including the 2009 Gold Medal Award at the New York International Film and Video Awards and 2nd place Best Documentary at the Rhode Island International Film Festival in 2008.

In 2011, Connell set out to make her second documentary feature Forget Us Not, which follows the stories of some of the five million non-Jewish Holocaust survivors including renowned artist Ceija Stojka and is narrated by Golden Globe-winning actor Ron Perlman. The film was released on the festival circuit in August 2013 and has won fifteen awards to date including Best of Festival at Vancouver's Columbia Gorge International Film Festival, Feature Documentary and Editing Awards Of Merit from Accolade Film Competition, Helping Hand International Humanitarian Award from the Rhode Island International Film Festival, Mark Of Distinction Film at the New York Independent Film Festival and Best Narration and World Peace Impact Award from the Artisan World Peace Hamptons Film Festival and Feature Documentary Audience Award at the First Glance International Film Festival Los Angeles. In 2016, on the United Nations International Holocaust Remembrance Day, Forget Us Not was featured by the Buffalo Holocaust Resource Center to a standing-room-only crowd. In 2019, Forget Us Not enjoyed an unprecedented second run on the international festival circuit. The film is will be made available for download and streaming mid 2021 across a variety of platforms.

== Other work ==
Along with being the executive producer and director of Displaced Yankee Productions, Heather Connell served as Board Chair of the Lineage Dance Company and Performing Arts Center (LPAC), a contemporary dance company dedicated to raising support and awareness for nonprofit organizations and making the arts accessible to audiences of all demographic and socioeconomic backgrounds. In 2016 and 2017, she co-produced LPAC's sold-out musical productions of Tick, Tick BOOM and The Last Five Years.

Shortly after filming Small Voices: The Stories of Cambodia's Children, Connell founded the Safe Haven Medical Outreach Program. Safe Haven is a non-profit educational and therapeutic outreach program for disabled children in Siem Riep, Cambodia. Safe Haven's mission is to provide a safe environment for children with disabilities, allowing them the opportunity to have access to the educational and therapeutic resources that they need in order to reach their full potential and their highest level of personal independence.

In 2013, Connell was one of GO Magazine's "100 Women We Love". In 2017, she was a David Chow Foundation Humanitarian Award Recipient. The David Chow Humanitarian Foundation recognizes and rewards dedicated and caring humanitarians found among charitable, religious, scientific, literary, and educational organizations worldwide that promote man’s humanity towards man whose service of unselfish giving might otherwise go unnoticed.

In 2019, she contributed to the book Art from Trauma: Genocide and Healing beyond Rwanda. The collection of essays examines the role of aesthetic expression in responding to discrimination, tragedy and violence and explores how gender influences responses to both literal and structural violence, including linguistic, familial, and cultural violence.

== Filmography ==
Year	Film	Role	Notes
2002	Choosing Your Course	Director/Writer/Producer	
2004	Black/White	Director/Writer/Producer	
2008	Small Voices: The Stories of Cambodia's Children	Director/Writer/Producer	Gold Medal Award at the New York International Film and Video Awards(2009); 2nd place Best Documentary at the Rhode Island International Film Festival(2008)
2013	Forget Us Not	Director/Writer/Producer	13 wins including Best Of Festival Columbia Gorge International, Feature Documentary Audience Award 1st Glance Film Festival and the World Peace Relations Award Artisan Film Festival

== See also ==
List of female film and television directors
