= Westfriedhof =

Westfriedhof, which in German means "west(ern) cemetery", can refer to:

- Westfriedhof (Munich)
  - Westfriedhof (Munich U-Bahn), U-Bahn station in Munich named after the cemetery
- Westfriedhof (Cologne)
