= Small Voices: The Stories of Cambodia's Children =

- Theatrical release poster
- Directed by: Heather Connell
- Written by: Heather Connell
- Produced by: Heather Connell
- Starring: Megan Follows
- Cinematography: Arthur Yee
- Edited by: Jason Rosenblatt
- Music by: Sherene Strausberg
- Production company: Displaced Yankee Productions
- Distributed by: Cinema Libre Studio
- Release date: 2008
- Running time: 83 minutes
- Country: United States
- Language: English
- Budget: $150,000

Small Voices: The Stories of Cambodia's Children is a 2008 documentary film that follows several street and dumpster children in Phnom Penh, Cambodia, on their journey to receive an education. The film was written, directed, and produced by Heather Connell.

The documentary was awarded the 2009 Gold Medal Award at the New York International Film and Video Awards and 2nd place Best Documentary at the Rhode Island International Film Festival in 2008.

== Synopsis ==
Thirty years ago, the Khmer Rouge perpetrated genocide upon their own people. Attempting to create a classless society, they killed nearly 1.7 million people, primarily the adult, educated and artistic population. Today, the children born to the uneducated, poverty-stricken survivors face a bleak future. With the farming lands in the countryside decimated and little opportunity in the cities, thousands of children are struggling to survive.

Abandoned by destitute family members, or forced to work in order to support themselves and relatives, these children are left vulnerable and exposed. On the streets of the capital city of Phnom Penh, there are over 12,000 children living, begging and working. Through their eyes, their day-to-day heartbreaks, dangers and hopes come to life.

Small Voices: The Stories of Cambodia's Children is a heart-warming film by Heather E. Connell, who spent several years documenting the struggles of the garbage dump children of Cambodia. She brings the film to life through the sights and sounds of Phnom Penh and gives the film its soul through the voices of these children as they share stories of their lives and their dreams for the future. They are the first generation of children born to survivors of the Khmer Rouge and have learned to survive in an economy and society struggling to rebuild itself.

== Aftermath ==
Shortly after filming Small Voices: The Stories of Cambodia's Children, Connell founded Safe Haven in 2010 in memory of her beloved Cambodian foster son Sumnang, who died at age 5 from complications related to epilepsy and cerebral palsy. Safe Haven's family centered, multi-disciplinary approach to providing therapeutic rehabilitation, facilitating access to medical services and providing training/education to parents/caregivers aims to provide children with disability the opportunity to reach their full potential and highest level of personal independence and health. Safehavenkhmer.org

== Awards and festivals ==
- 2009 New York International Film and Video Awards - Gold Medal Award
- 2009 Big Muddy Film Festival
- 2008 New Orleans Film Festival
- 2008 Rhode Island International Film Festival - 2nd Place Best Documentary
