= Im Namen der Liebe =

Studio album by Marianne Rosenberg
- Released: 13 March 2020
- Length: 41:36
- Label: Telamo
- Producer: Alex Wende

Marianne Rosenberg chronology
Best of (2013)	Im Namen der Liebe (2020)	Diva (2022)

Im Namen der Liebe (transl. In the Name of Love) is a studio album by German singer Marianne Rosenberg. It was released by Telamo Musik on 13 March 2020 in German-speaking Europe. The album debuted and peaked at number one on the German Albums Chart, becoming Rosenberg's first album to do so.

== Track listing ==
All tracks produced by Alex Wende.

No.	Title	Writer(s)	Length
1.	"Im Namen der Liebe"	Marianne Rosenberg; Max Rosenberg	3:40
2.	"Wann (Mr. 100%)"	Marianne Rosenberg; Max Rosenberg	3:46
3.	"Liebe ist nicht alles"	Marianne Rosenberg; Max Rosenberg	4:16
4.	"Hallo mein Freund"	Marianne Rosenberg; Max Rosenberg	3:50
5.	"Du berührst mich"	Marianne Rosenberg; Max Rosenberg	3:50
6.	"Ich fühl dich"	Marianne Rosenberg; Max Rosenberg	4:22
7.	"Adriano"	Marianne Rosenberg; Max Rosenberg	3:31
8.	"Wenn wir lieben"	Ken Taylor; Marianne Rosenberg; Christian Kretschmar	3:32
9.	"Spiel das Lied nochmal"	Marianne Rosenberg; Max Rosenberg	4:52
10.	"Da wo Liebe ist"	Marianne Rosenberg; Max Rosenberg	3:25
11.	"Wenn ich wirklich will"	Marianne Rosenberg; Max Rosenberg; Dirk Riegner	3:58
12.	"Die Antwort weiß nur der Wind"	Marianne Rosenberg; Riegner; ´	3:38

== Charts ==
=== Weekly charts ===
Chart (2020)	Peak position
Austrian Albums (Ö3 Austria)	12
German Albums (Offizielle Top 100)	1
Swiss Albums (Schweizer Hitparade)	17

=== Year-end charts ===
Chart (2020)	Position
German Albums (Official Top 100)	92

== Release history ==
Region	Date	Format	Label	Ref(s)
Various	13 March 2020	CD; digital download	Telamo Musik	
