= Džuvljarke: Roma Lesbian Existence =

Book by Vera Kurtić

- Author: Vera Kurtić
- Translator: Ana Zorbić
- Cover artist: Christina Piskoulidis
- Publisher: Ženski prostor
- Publication date: 2014
- Pages: 95
- ISBN: 978-86-88475-04-4

Džuvljarke: Roma Lesbian Existence, (Serbian: Џувљарке – лезбијска егзистенција Ромкиња, romanized: Džuvljarke – lezbijska egzistencija Romkinja) is a 2014 book by the Romani Serbian writer Vera Kurtić in which the testimonies of Roma lesbian women about their daily lives and the problems they face in their communities are recorded. It is one of the first studies published on the Roma and LGBT intersection.

== Content ==
The book contains testimonies of fifteen lesbian Roma women who talk about their daily lives and the problems they face in their communities. The cultural-anthropological document is, according to one reviewer, the first study of its kind, and one of the first studies on the Roma/LGBT intersection, which began to see publication in the 2010s. The very term "džuvljarka" is a Romani word that, in the Serbian-speaking area, denotes a lesbian in a derogatory sense. Most of the participants used the word "lesbian" for the first time in the interviews for the book.

According to the author, the Roma lesbian community is not united by any common goal; with this book, she aimed to give it its own voice. Through the stories of Roma lesbians, the author unveils the burdens of gender, race, national affiliation, class and minority sexual existence and their mutual intersection in discrimination. The book shows not only the discrimination that takes place within the Roma community, but also discrimination within the lesbian community by "white" lesbians. It also discusses how classism intersects with other oppressions, to negatively affect the lives of lesbian Roma women.

Other interviewees in the book include members of non-LGBTQ Roma communities. Their testimonies demonstrated that although they recognise gay men and trans people within Roma society, lesbians were often "completely invisible".

== Reception ==
One of the most important aspects of the work is how it provides context for the experiences of Roma lesbian women. Sociologist Laura Corradi has described how the work has significant implications for the social sciences as it shows a nuanced representation of community perspectives, critiques how patriarchy affects male feminists, and provides confirmation that mainstream feminism does not meet the needs of Romani women. Activist Tjaša Kancler described the work as a "crucial book", which is explicit in its requirement that the needs of lesbian Romani women should be part of the wider dialogue on LGBTQ rights.
