= Philomena Franz =

German Romani author (1922–2022)

- Born: Philomena Köhler; 21 July 1922; Biberach an der Riß, Württemberg, German Republic
- Died: 28 December 2022 (aged 100); Rösrath, North Rhine-Westphalia, Germany
- Resting place: Westfriedhof (Cologne)
- Occupations: Writer and poet
- Known for: Romani Holocaust survivor
- Notable work: Zwischen Liebe und Hass

Philomena Franz (née Köhler; 21 July 1922 – 28 December 2022) was a Sinti writer and activist from Germany, who was a survivor of the Romani Holocaust, having been imprisoned in Auschwitz. She later published works that recounted her experiences and was recognised as a significant voice in Romani literature.

== Biography ==
Philomena Köhler was born on 21 July 1922. Her family were musicians and she had seven siblings. Her father Johann Köhler was a cellist and her mother was a singer. Her grandfather, the cellist Johannes Haag, was an award-winning member of a string quartet. Up to 1938, the family performed at a range of venues in both Germany and France. However that year, after years of Nazi persecution, Himmler issued an order that required all Roma people to register with the state, and confirmed that, according to the Nazi regime, Roma were non-Aryan.

Franz was registered in the Auschwitz-Birkenau camp on 21 April 1944 with the prisoner number Z 10,550 under her maiden name, and her further transport is recorded there for 25 May 1944. In May/June 1944, Philomena Franz was taken to the Ravensbrück concentration camp and registered there under number 40.307. She escaped from a camp near Wittenberge in 1945 and managed to stay alive until the end of the war. Her parents, uncles, nephews, nieces and five of her seven siblings were murdered in Porajmos (Romani Holocaust). One of her surviving brothers did military service in the Wehrmacht, and was shielded from discovery by his commanding officer, due to his skill with horses.

After the liberation, she performed again with her future husband and her brother, including in officers' messes of the US armed forces and at events in Ansbach and Tübingen. She met her husband, Oskar Franz, during this period, and they went on to have five children. In the 1970s Franz began to talk about her experiences in the Holocaust, as one of her sons was bullied at school for his Roma identity. She also campaigned for compensation for all Roma and Sinti survivors and was ultimately awarded 15,000 Marks. However, welfare officers deducted other payments, leaving the sum much reduced.

Later, she lived for a time in Bergisch Gladbach, where she was awarded honorary citizenship in 2021. Franz died on December 28, 2022. The mayor of Bergisch Gladbach, Frank Stein, paid tribute to her saying that she worked tirelessly for reconciliation and coexistence, working for a future where all people can live in peace. Franz was buried on January 9, 2023 in Cologne's Westfriedhof.

== Works ==
Franz's first book was published in 1982 and was entitled Zigeunermärchen (in English, Gypsy Tales). In her second book Zwischen Liebe und Hass (1985), Franz wrote her autobiography. In it she described her time in Auschwitz and how she “continued life after zero point”. The book is one of the first by survivors of Porajmos. It was translated to Czech and Spanish in 2021.

The third book, a collection of poems entitled Tragen wir einen Blütenzweig im Herzen was published. Her second autobiographical work, Stichworte (in English, Keywords), followed her previous prose and poetry volumes. The most recent book, published in 2017, was entitled Wie die Wolken laufen (in English, How the Clouds Run).

In addition to her writings, she spoke regularly to a wide range of audiences, advocating for the recognition of Roma genocide in the Holocaust. Her witness as a holocaust survivor was also recorded using 360° technology, for future generations.

== Reception ==
Franz is described as one of the writers in the 1980s who broke silence over Romani and Sinti Holocaust. Other authors include Ceija Stojka, Otto Rosenberg, Walter Winter and Alfred Lessing. Franz and Stojka are also described as pioneers of women's Romani writing by Marianne C. Zwicker and others.

Researcher Paola Toninato described how in Zwischen Liebe und Hass, Franz uses her idyllic childhood to spark contrast with the horrors of the concentration camps. Julia Blandfort emphasized the shared contemporary witness role of Franz, which appealed to the majority of society to recognize the genocide of the European Roma. Wilhelm Solms and Klaus-Michael Bogdal cited her as a contemporary witness to the Holocaust.

Franz's childhood experiences with horses and horse-dealing is also recognised as an important cultural memory for Sinti people. In January 2015, she was one of 19 survivors of the Auschwitz concentration camp whose contributions were included in the cover report The Last Witnesses in the weekly magazine Der Spiegel.

In 2023 she was the subject of the film Mi holocausto.

== Awards ==
- 1995: Federal Cross of Merit on ribbon
- 2001: “Women of Europe Germany 2001” of the European Movement Germany
- 2013: Order of Merit of the State of North Rhine-Westphalia
- 2021: Honorary citizenship of the city of Bergisch Gladbach
