= Marianne Rosenberg =

German singer

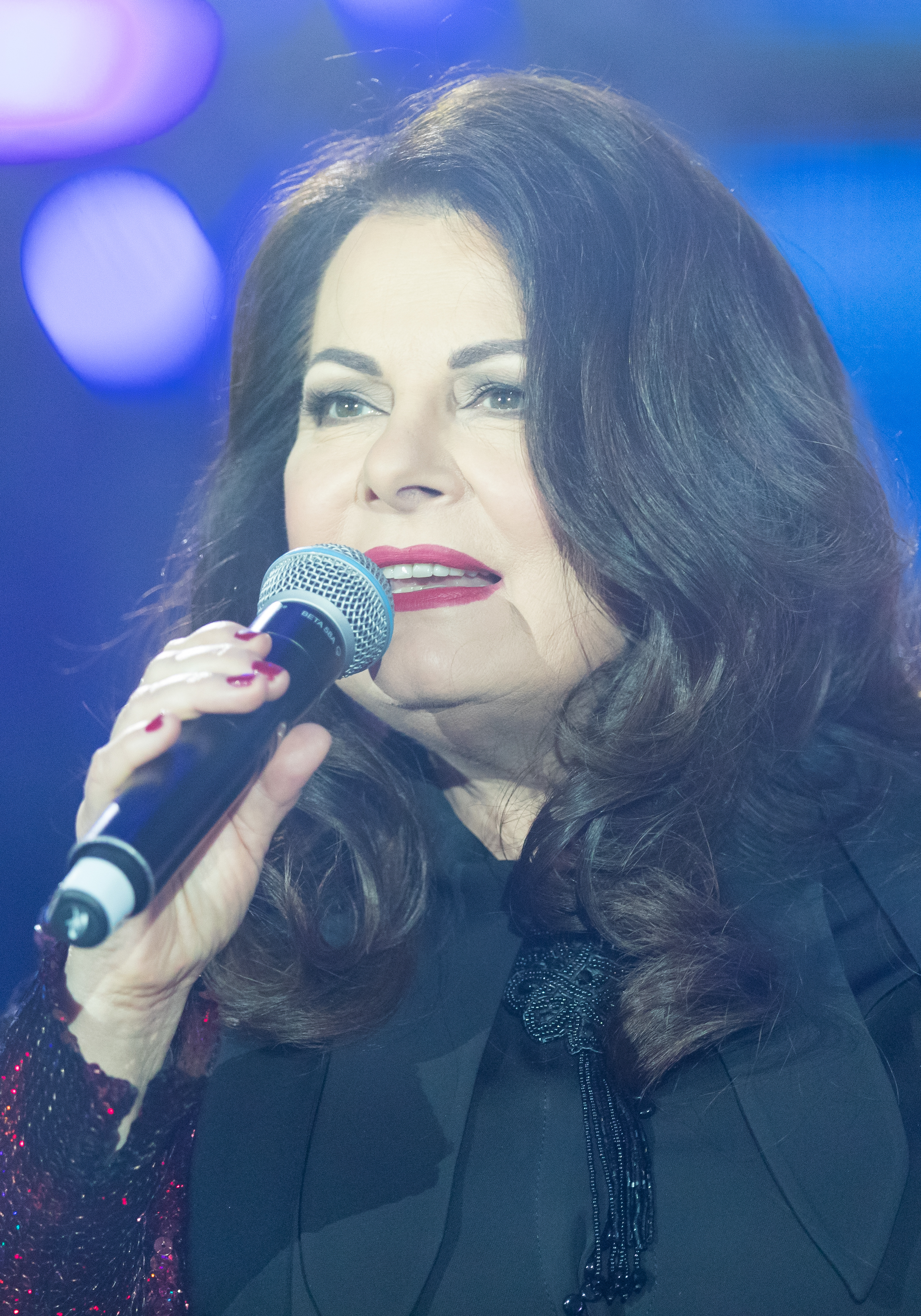
- Rosenberg in 2018

Background information
- Born: 10 March 1955 (age 71); West Berlin, West Germany
- Genres: Schlager
- Occupations: Singer; songwriter
- Years active: 1970–present
- Website: rosenberg.de

Marianne Rosenberg (born 10 March 1955) is a German Schlager music singer and songwriter.

== Personal background ==
Rosenberg is of Roma and Sinti background. Her father, Otto, an Auschwitz death camp survivor, was an activist on Roma and Sinti issues. Her sister, Petra, also advocates for Roma issues.

== Career ==
Rosenberg's musical career was consolidated throughout the 1970s with hits such as "Fremder Mann" ("Stranger"), "Er gehört zu mir" ("He belongs to me"), "Ich bin wie du" ("I am like you") which was later sampled by Blue Adonis on their track "Disco Cop", "Marleen", and "Lieder der Nacht" ("Songs of the Night"), often making appearances on TV and radio.

She is considered one of the most successful performers of German Schlager of the last four decades. She was one of the first German singers to introduce disco in the German music market with "Ich bin wie du". Her career underwent another revival in 1989 with the hit song "I Need Your Love Tonight" from the soundtrack Rivalen der Rennbahn ("Racetrack Rivals"), written by Dieter Bohlen.

=== Eurovision Song Contest ===
"Er gehört zu mir" was a finalist in the competition to select a Eurovision Song Contest entry for Germany in 1975 but only placed tenth, even though the song became one of Rosenberg's biggest hits. Rosenberg's attempts to sing in Eurovision took a surprising turn in 1976 when she was shortlisted to represent Luxembourg with the song "Tout peut arriver au cinéma". Although it did not win, it went on to be a German hit under the title "Lieder der Nacht". In 1978, Rosenberg competed in the German heats again, and this time placed seventh with "Nein, weinen werd' ich nicht" ("No, I Won't Cry"). Her 1980 entry "Ich werd' da sein, wenn es Sturm gibt" ("I will be there when it storms") was not as successful, finishing twelfth (and last). Rosenberg's final challenge for Eurovision was in 1982 with the song "Blue Jeans Kinder", a ballad which took eighth place.

Rosenberg also achieved chart success in other European countries, including Austria and the Netherlands. She is also considered a gay icon in several countries, such as the Netherlands and her native Germany.

=== Continued success ===
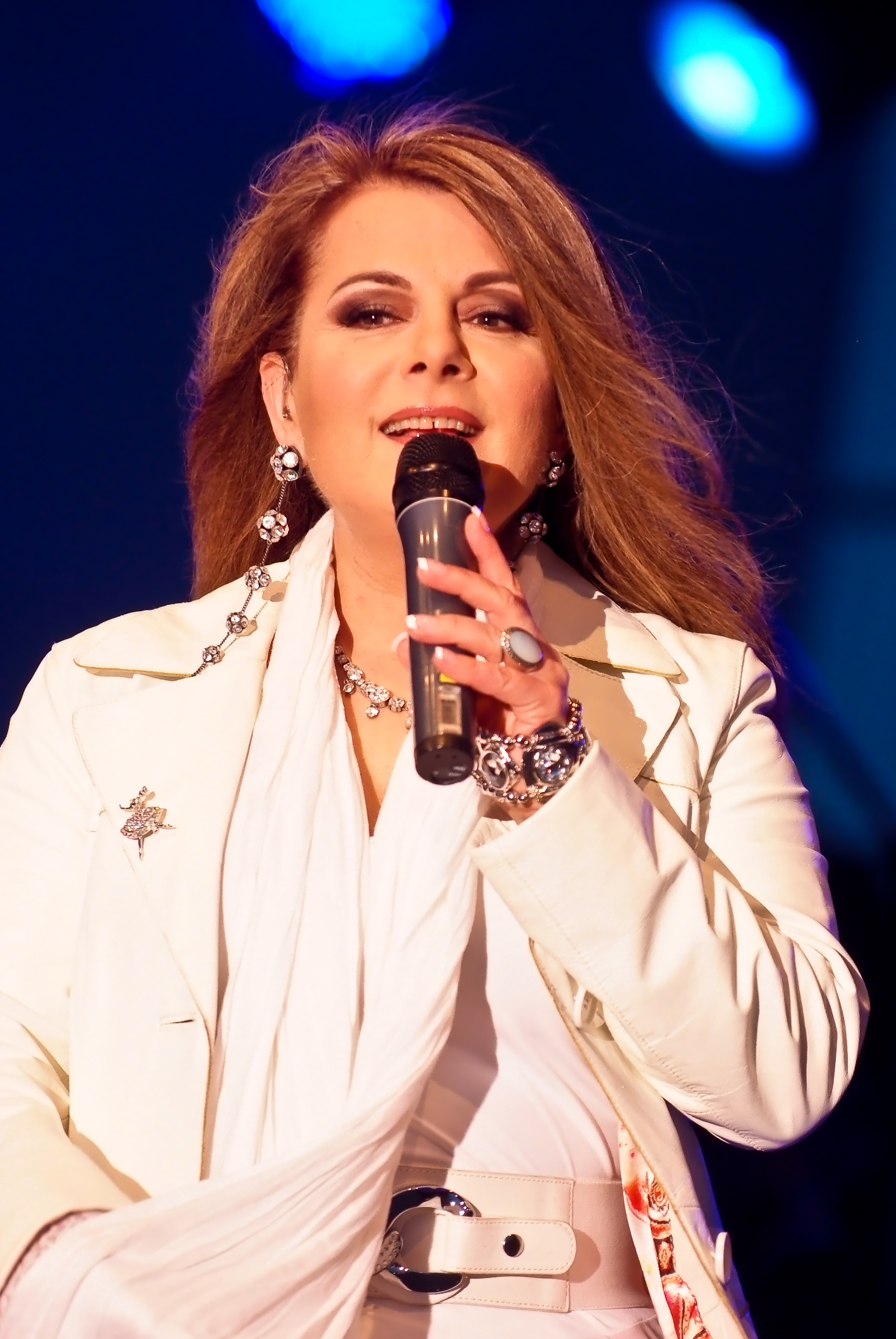
Rosenberg in 2009

In 2004, Rosenberg re-released Marleen in a remixed version and with a new promotional video. The single reached number 33 on the official German Charts as compiled by Media Control. The follow-up single "Er gehört zu mir" reached number 77. Both singles were taken from her 2004 disco-flavoured album Für immer wie heute, which reached number 12 on the German album charts, and consisted of remakes of her hits from the 70s.

In 2008, Rosenberg released her first jazz and chanson album, I'm a Woman.

In 2011 she released her first album with new music since Himmlisch in 2000. With Regenrhythmus she was trying to change her sound from being a German Schlager singer to a more modern sound. She was involved in the production of the album and received positive reviews for the result. The album reached number 29 on the German charts.

It wasn't until 2020 when Rosenberg released her next album. With Im Namen der Liebe she made it to the number 1 spot of the German album charts for the first time in her career. She released a Jubiläums Edition of the successful album later in 2020, which contained a second CD with remixes and new songs. She continued her success with the next albums, Diva in 2022, and Bunter Planet in 2024.

== Discography ==
- 1970 Mr. Paul McCartney (D-Charts: # 33)
- 1972 Fremder Mann (D-Charts: # 8)
- 1972 Er ist nicht wie du (D-Charts: # 5)
- 1972 Warum gerade ich (D-Charts: # 26)
- 1973 Jeder Weg hat mal ein Ende (D-Charts: # 9)
- 1973 Laß dir Zeit (D-Charts: # 40)
- 1974 Ein Stern erwacht (D-Charts: # 21)
- 1974 Wären Tränen aus Gold (D-Charts: # 20)
- 1975 Karneval (D-Charts: # 46)
- 1975 Er gehört zu mir (D-Charts: # 7)
- 1975 Ich bin wie du (D-Charts: # 18)
- 1976 Lieder der Nacht (D-Charts: # 6)
- 1977 Marleen (D-Charts: # 5)
- 1977 Einen Tag mehr als für immer (So lang' werde ich dich lieben) (D-Charts: # 45)
- 1977 Nimm dir Zeit für sie (Eh' die Zeit sie dir nimmt)
- 1978 Schade, ich kann dich nicht lieben
- 1978 Cariblue
- 1978 Andreas
- 1979 Wo ist Jane
- 1979 Herz aus Glas (D-Charts: # 25)
- 1979 Und die Liebe, sie kam
- 1980 Sie ist kalt
- 1980 Traumexpress
- 1980 Ruf an! (D-Charts: # 54)
- 1980 Ich hab' auf Liebe gesetzt (D-Charts: # 31)
- 1982 Nur Sieger steh'n im Licht (D-Charts: # 32)
- 1982 Der Mann vom Kartell
- 1989 I Need Your Love Tonight (D-Charts: # 56)
- 1989 Ich denk' an dich
- 1990 Eins, zwei, drei (Ich hab' gedacht es ist vorbei)
- 1992 Nur eine Nacht
- 1992 Nie mehr so wie es war
- 2000 Himmlisch
- 2000 Wieder da
- 2000 Gift
- 2001 Nur das Beste
- 2004 Lieder der Nacht-Special ed.
- 2004 Für immer wie heute (D-Charts: # 12)
- 2008 I'm a Woman
- 2011 Rette mich durch die Nacht (CD single)
- 2011 Regenrhythmus (D-Charts # 29)
- 2011 Und wenn ich sing (CD single)
- 2011 Genau entgegengesetzt (CD single)
- 2013 Alles klingt (group Schattenherz) (CD single)
- 2020 Im Namen der Liebe (D-Charts: # 1)
- 2020 Im Namen der Liebe (Jubiläums Edition)
- 2022 Diva (D-Charts # 5)
- 2024 Bunter Planet (D-Charts # 9)
