= Andrej Giňa =

Czech writer

- Born: 1 January 1936; Šarišské Sokolovce, Czechoslovakia
- Died: 30 September 2015 (aged 79); Rokycany, Czech Republic
- Occupations: Writer, musician
- Writing career
- Language: Romani, Czech
- Years active: 1976 to 2015
- Genre: Prose
- Notable works: Paťiv: ještě víme, co je úcta: vyprávění, úvahy, pohádky (2013); Bijav: romane priphende = Svatba: romské povídky (1991)

Andrej Giňa (January 1, 1936 – September 30, 2015) was a Czech writer of Romani origin who specialised in the transcription of traditional Romani stories which were spread through word of mouth.

== Biography ==
His works have been praised by scholars in Central Europe and further afar as key aspects of Romani literature. His most famous work was adapted into film by CT1 - Dilino a Cert. Other works include Paťiv: ještě víme, co je úcta: vyprávění, úvahy, pohádky (2013) and Bijav: romane priphende = Svatba: romské povídky (1991).

== Personal life ==
Giňa was born into a family where music was a defining feature of life. His father was in fact a blacksmith and musician although he was illiterate. His short stay in Prague was followed by settling down in Rokycany, where in the 1960s his work was refused to be published. In 1989 he joined the Romani Citizens Initiative where he embarked on a journey of Romani rights in Czechoslovakia. Giňa was also part of a successful band which paved the way for other rom-pop artists called Rytmus 84. They had released several songs before their dissolution and remain an ingrained part of Romani music to this day.

== Death ==
Giňa died on 30 September 2015 of cancer. His funeral was attended by many supporters and fellow activists.
