= Lineage Performing Arts Center =

Performing arts venue in Pasadena, California

Coordinates: 34.14415°N 118.15064°W

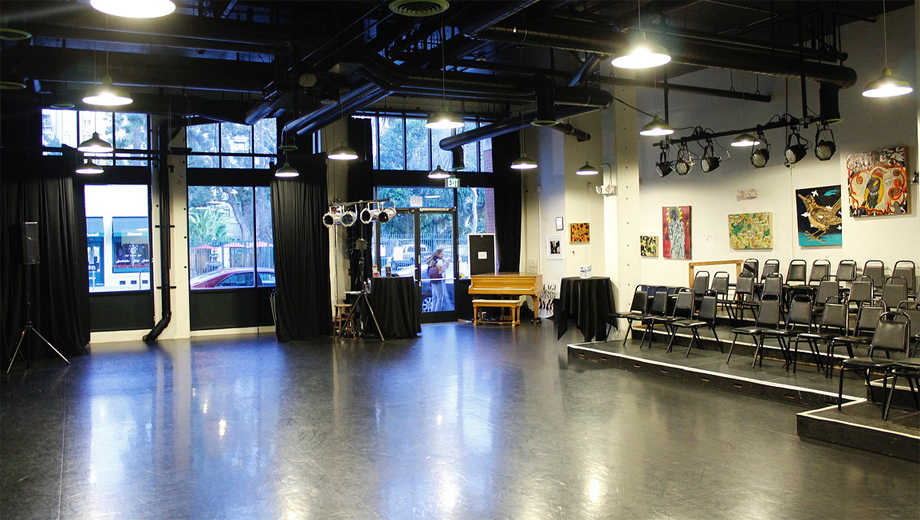
Interior of the Lineage Performing Arts Center

The Lineage Performing Arts Center (LPAC) is a non-profit performing arts venue in Pasadena, California. This black-box theatre hosts a variety of events including dance and music performances, theatre productions, art exhibitions, fundraising events, film screenings, and private gatherings. LPAC is the home of the Lineage Dance Company.

== History ==
=== Lineage Dance Company ===
In 1999, Hilary Thomas, artistic director, presented Lineage's first benefit performance for Young and Healthy. Since then, Lineage has presented over 500 concerts and helped raise more than $150,000 for organizations such as the Global AIDS Interfaith Alliance, the Hope and Light Foundation, Habitat for Humanity, the Constance G. Zahorik Breast Center at Huntington Hospital, Five Acres, and many other health, educational, arts and social service agencies. In 2006, the board of directors formed and in 2007, Lineage was established as an independent 501(c)(3) organization. Lineage has been invited to perform at Dance Across the City Boston (which became the model for the Pasadena Dance Festival) and New York’s Joyce SoHo and has completed tours in California, Nevada and Montana. In 2006, Lineage produced Dancing through the Ages at the Pasadena Civic Auditorium with their first grant from City of Pasadena Arts & Culture I. In 2008, the Tournament of Roses Foundation funded "A Day of Dance" in partnership with Kidspace Museum and the Pasadena Arts & Culture Commission, City of Pasadena Cultural Affairs Division provided funding for the First Annual Pasadena Dance Festival. Lineage partnered with Pasadena Symphony for TEMPO!, a program in 13 Pasadena Unified School District elementary schools, and provided professional development for PUSD classroom teachers. After receiving training with Mark Morris Dance Group, Lineage launched its first community outreach class Dancing with Parkinson's.

=== Lineage Performing Arts Center ===
As the Lineage Dance Company grew, the need for a location to call home increased. The doors to the Lineage Performing Arts Center (LPAC) opened on May 1, 2010. Since then, Lineage has been providing the community with a hub for the arts. A large range of arts performances have been held in this space, from magic shows to art gallery openings. In October 2014, the position of Executive Director was created to oversee staff and business operations. LPAC will continue to provide arts to Pasadena and its surrounding areas.
