= Westfriedhof (Cologne) =

Cemetery in Cologne, Germany

Coordinates: 50°58′19″N 6°52′43″E

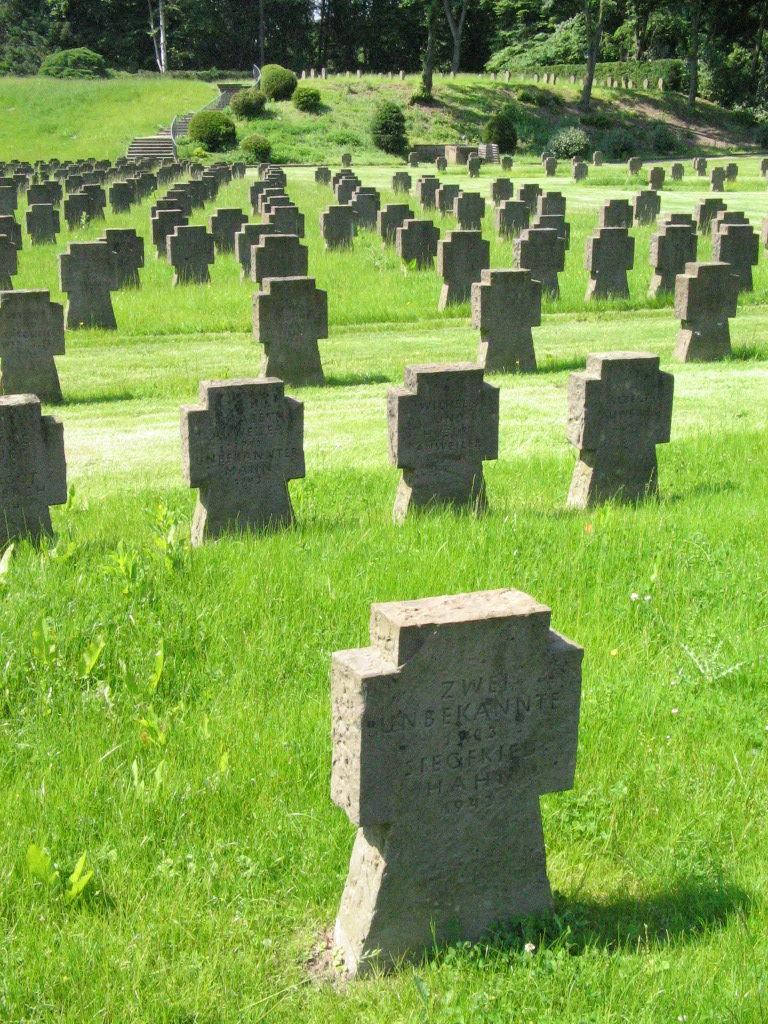
War graves in Cologne Westfriedhof

Westfriedhof is a cemetery in Cologne, Germany. With an area of 52 hectares, it is amongst the largest of the cemeteries in the city.

Romani holocaust survivor, Philomena Franz, is buried in the cemetery.
