= Otto Rosenberg (writer and activist) =

German writer and activist (1927–2001)

Otto Rosenberg

Otto Rosenberg (28 April 1927 – 4 July 2001), was a Holocaust survivor, author of A Gypsy in Auschwitz (1999), activist, and founder of Sinti Union of Berlin and Organization for German Sinti and Roma. He was detained in Berlin-Marzahn in 1939. He was born in East Prussia and raised in Berlin.

== Writing ==
In 1995, Rosenberg recorded his memories on tape, and with writer Ulrich Enzenberger he published Das Brennglas in 1998. Michael Grobbel notes the book's 'colloquial and at time laconic style', as a result of the book staying true to its oral origins, and explains how Rosenberg discusses the continued 'persistance of racial intolerance after 1945'.

It was published as A Gypsy in Auschwitz in 1999, translated into English by Helmut Bölger. The book features an introduction from former Lord Mayor of Berlin Klaus Schütz. His memoir has been compared to those of other survivors, Philomena Franz and Ceija Stojka.

According to author of Representing the Holocaust in Children's Literature, Lydia Kokkola, it is 'one of the very few books about the Gypsy Holocaust for young readers'. The book is recommended by Doris Bergen as further reading in her book War and Genocide: a Concise History of the Holocaust.

== Activism and legacy ==
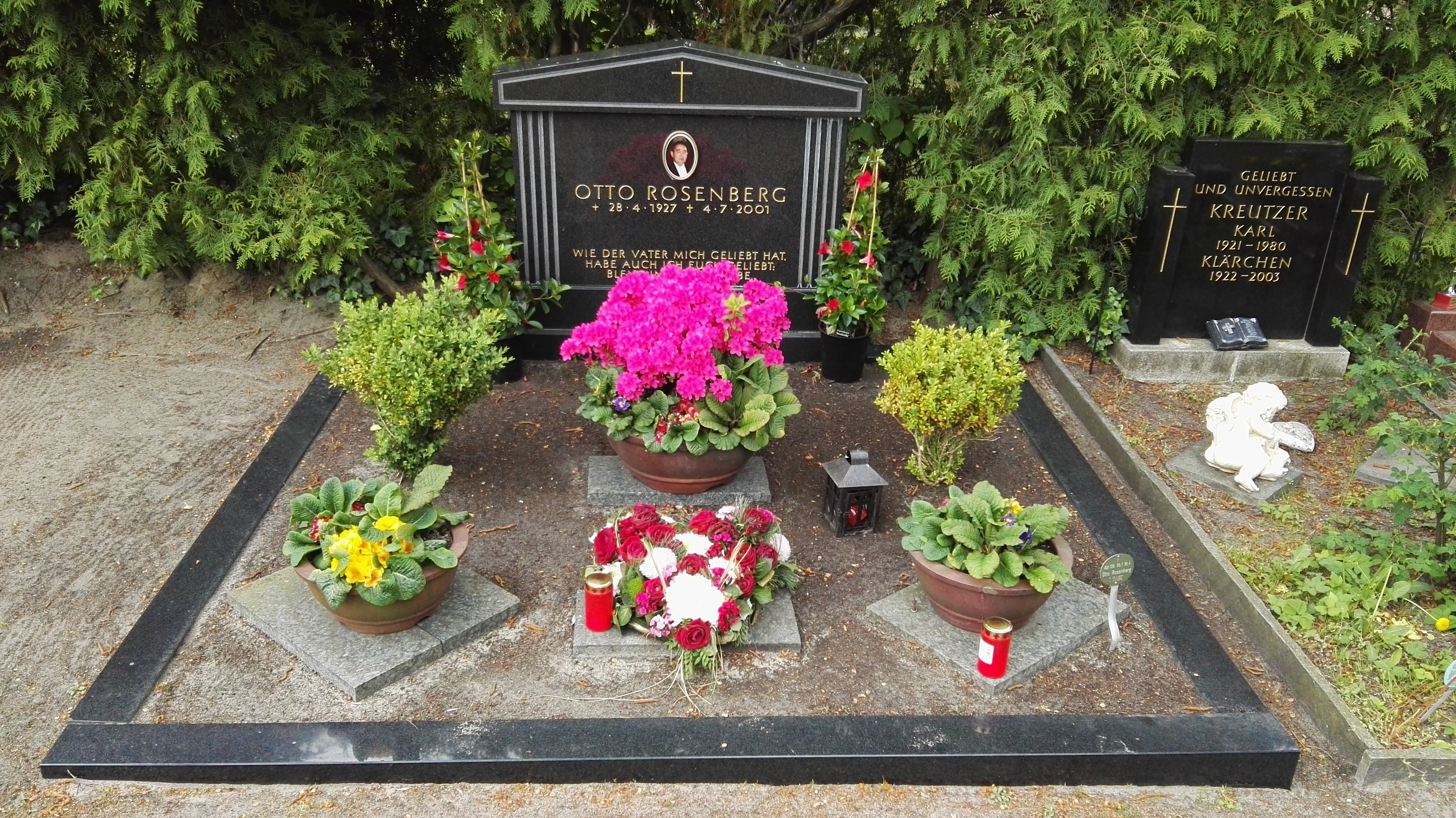
Otto Rosenberg's grave at the Neuer St Michael Friedhof, Berlin

In 1970, Rosenberg founded the Berlin-Brandenburg State Association of German Sinti and Roma, and he remained chairman until his death. Rosenberg frequently talked about his experiences in German schools.

In 1998 he was awarded the Federal Cross of Merit First Class of the Federal Republic of Germany, 'for his special services to understanding between the minority and the majority'.

A street and a square in the former grounds of Berlin-Marzahn were named after him in 2007.

== Family ==
His daughter, Marianne Rosenberg, is a singer, composer and author.
