= Vera Kurtić =

Romani radical feminist activist from Serbia

Vera Kurtić (Serbian: Вера Куртић) is a Romani feminist activist and writer from Serbia, She is the author of the book Džuvljarke: Roma Lesbian Existence, which is the first book to discuss non-heteronormative Roma women's sexuality.

== Biography ==
Kurtić comes from Niš. She studied sociology and communication sciences at the University of Niš. Her activism includes campaigning for the Roma community, LGBTQI rights, women's rights and animal rights; some of this work also includes gender awareness training and veganism.

A member of the Serbian women's rights organization Ženskiprostor, which was founded in Niš in 1998, she was its Executive Coordinator until 2019. She founded the Roma Women's Network of Serbia and instigated more informal LGBT Roma community organisation. She also established the Campaign Month of Roma Women Activism. Until 2020, she worked at the Council of Europe as part of the ROMACTED program.

Kurtić's research deals with the intersectionality of gender, sexual orientation, race and nationality and the presence of marginalized groups in the social space. She is author of the book Džuvljarke: Roma Lesbian Existence (2013) which discusses the discrimination that Roma lesbians face. It is the first book to discuss non-heteronormative Roman women's sexuality. She has also collaborated with Roma sociologist Jelena Jovanović.

== Selected works ==
- Kurtić, Vera. "Džuvljarke. Roma Lesbian Existence." (2013).
- Daróczi, Anna, Angéla Kóczé, Jelena Jovanovic, Sarah Judith Cemlyn, Violeta Vajda, Vera Kurtić, Alina Serban, and Lisa Smith. "Gender, ethnicity and activism:‘the miracle is when we don't give up…’." Journal of Poverty and Social Justice 26, no. 1 (2018): 77-94.
- Kurtić, Vera, and Jelena Jovanović. "Romani Women’s Friendship, Empowerment, and Politics: Views on Romani Feminism in Serbia and Beyond." The Romani Women’s Movement. Routledge, 2018. 135-158.
