= Matéo Maximoff =

French writer and pastor

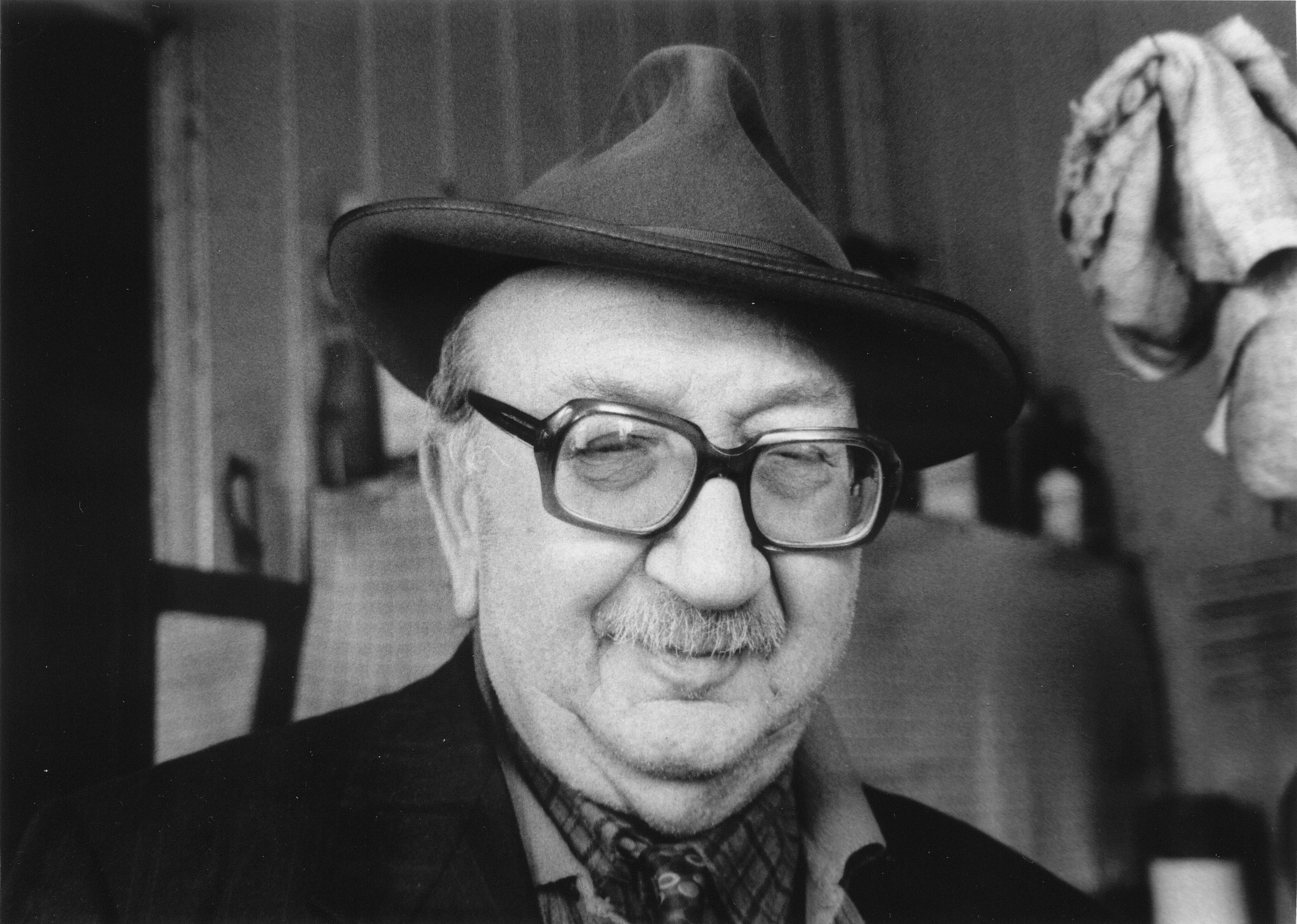
- Born: 17 January 1917
- Died: 24 November 1999 (aged 82)

Matéo Maximoff (French pronunciation: [mateo maksimɔf]; 17 January 1917 – 24 November 1999) was a French writer and Evangelical pastor of Romani ethnicity. His eleven books have been translated into fourteen languages. Born in Spain, he had parents who had migrated from Russia and France. His family sought shelter in France with relatives during the Spanish Civil War. After the outbreak of World War II, they were arrested as foreign nationals and interned for years, along with many other foreign refugees. He settled in France after the war and made his literary career there.

== Early life and education ==
Maximoff was born in Barcelona, Spain. His father was a Kalderash Rom from Russia; and his mother was a Manouche from France. She was a cousin of the guitarist Django Reinhardt and his younger siblings.

Maximoff's father, a tinker, a traditional trade among Kalderash, taught him how to read, write and count. He also had much to tell him about Russia, Kalderash history, and different Roma and countries. He died when Maximoff was 14. Maximoff took over as a tinker to support himself, his mother and younger brothers and sisters. He taught his siblings to read and write.

== Refuge in France ==
In 1936, because of the Spanish Civil War, Maximoff with his mother and siblings left Spain to seek shelter among relatives in France. In 1940, after the defeat of France in World War II and German occupation, the Maximoffs were arrested under suspicion of intelligence with the enemy, as were many other foreign refugees. Maximoff's family were interned in a camp for 'spies' for 42 days before being transferred to a 'Gypsy camp' in Tarbes. In May 1941, they were interned at a camp for 'nomads' nearby Lannemezan. At that time, the Roma were not allowed to travel and had their ID's (travel license) withheld by local law enforcement agencies.

== Literary career ==
After World War II, Maximoff settled in France. He wrote eleven novels, which have been translated into fourteen languages. He also produced a book that included ethnographic photographs of the Roma in France.

In 1964, Maximoff became an Evangelical pastor. He translated the Bible into Kalderash Romani language from French in 1994, although only the New Testament, Ruth and Psalms were published. Many of his other books were published into English in the late twentieth century, before his death in 1999 in France.

== Bibliography ==
- Angels of Destiny (1999)
- People of Roads (1995)
- Roads without Caravans (1993)
- This world that isn't mine (1992)
- Say that with tears (1990)
- Vinguerka (1987)
- The Doll of Mameliga (1986)
- Condemned for Surviving (1984)
- The Seventh Daughter (1979)
- Savina (1957)
- The Price of Freedom (1955)
- The Ursitory (1946)
