= Ceija Stojka =

Holocaust survivor and artist (1933–2013)

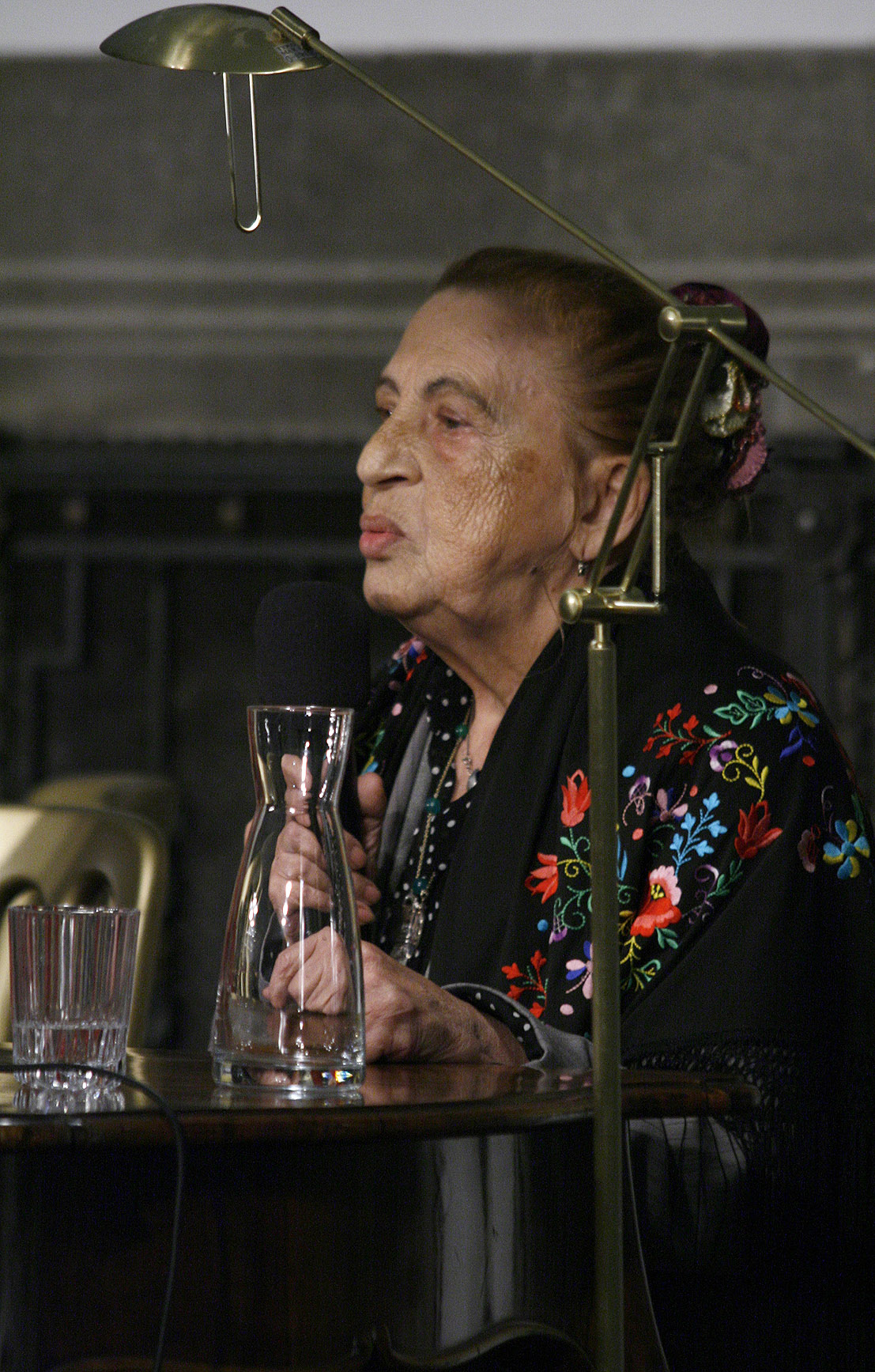
- Ceija Stojka, 2008
- Born: 23 May 1933; Kraubath an der Mur, Austria
- Died: 28 January 2013 (aged 79); Vienna, Austria

Ceija Stojka (23 May 1933 – 28 January 2013) was an Austrian Romani writer, painter, activist, and musician, and survivor of the Holocaust.

== Life ==
Stojka was born in Kraubath an der Mur, Styria, in 1933 as the fifth of six children to mother Maria "Sidi" Rigo Stojka and father Karl "Wackar" Horvath. Two of her brothers, Karl "Karli" Stojka and Johann "Mongo" Stojka, were also writers and musicians.

The family were Roman Catholic Lovara Roma, members of the Bagareschtschi clan on their father's side and Giletschi clan on their mother's side. The Stojkas were horse-traders whose caravan spent winters in Vienna and summers travelling through the Austrian countryside, where the family could trace their heritage for over 200 years. Together with her mother and four of the five brothers, she survived the Holocaust and internment at Auschwitz, Ravensbruck, and Bergen-Belsen. Her father was sent to the Dachau concentration camp, then to Schloss Hartheim, where he was killed. Her youngest brother Ossi died in the "Zigunerfamillienlager" at Auschwitz-Birkenau in 1943.

Stojka, her mother, and brothers were freed by the British from Bergen-Belsen in 1945 and returned to Vienna. Of the more than 200 members of her extended family, only five survived the Holocaust. Ceija began school at the age of twelve in the second grade.

Stojka had two children, a son in 1949 and a daughter in 1951. Her son Jano, a jazz musician, died from drugs in 1979. She earned her livelihood selling fabric door-to-door, as well as rugs at markets at which she earned her living until 1984. Later, she lived in Vienna as a writer, painter, singer, and public lecturer.

In 1992, she became the Austrian spokeswoman for the recognition of the Roma and Sinti genocide, along being a voice in the struggle against discrimination that the Roma continue to suffer throughout Europe.

She died in Vienna in 2013 at the age of 79.

== Autobiographies ==
Stojka wrote three autobiographies. The first, We Live in Seclusion: The Memories of a Romni, was published in 1988 and was one of the first popular works to make public the issues concerning the Nazi persecution of the Austrian Romani people. The publication received substantial public attention for its subject matter, as well as for the fact that a woman had written it, breaking Romani convention. She continued exploring these issues in Travelers on This World (1992) and I Dream That I am Alive - Liberated From Bergen-Belsen (Träume ich, dass ich lebe) (2005). All three books were published with the help of Karin Berger as editor.

Stojka's works have been compared to those of other Romani holocaust survivors, such as Philomena Franz, Otto Rosenberg, Walter Winter and Alfred Lessing.

=== Memoirs by her brother ===
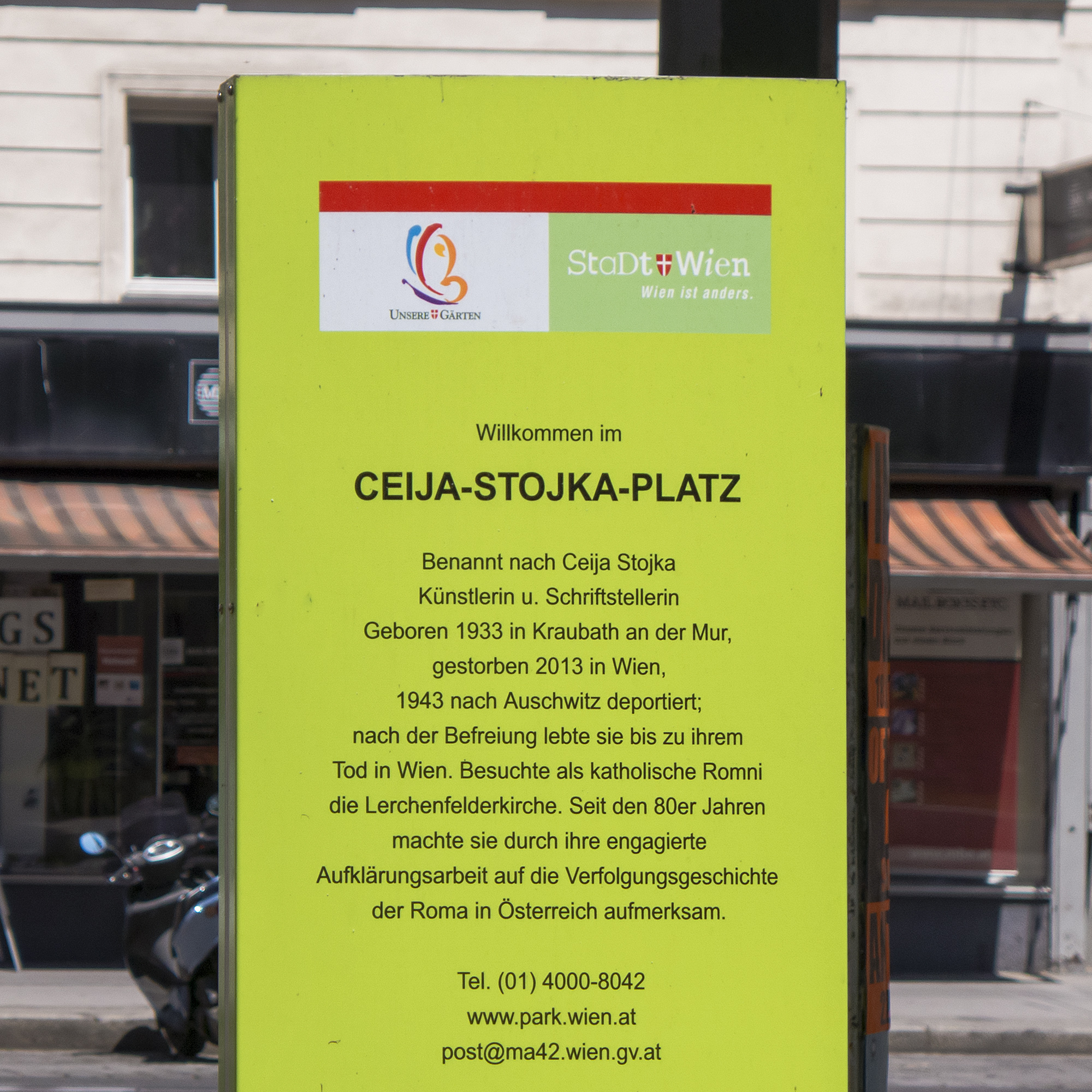
A commemorative sign for Ceija Stojka Platz in Vienna, Austria.

Two of Stojka's brothers, Karl and Mongo Stojka, also published autobiographies about their family's experiences of Austrian Roma persecution under the Nazis. Karl Stojka, the fourth child in the family, released Auf der ganzen Welt zu Hause in 1994. Mongo Stojka, the oldest male in the family, published Papierene Kinder: Glück, Zerstörung und Neubeginn einer Roma-Familie in Österreich in 2000. These overlapping autobiographies are among the only opportunities to compare the memories of family members who survived the Holocaust and consider the "separate and collective experiences of a major historical traumatic event," given that only about 18% of Austrian Roma survived Nazi persecution.

=== Film ===
The Austrian author and filmmaker Karin Berger, published several books by Stojka, and produced two documentary films on her life and work:

Ceija Stojka, Austria 1999, 85 min. [Navigator Film] and Unter den Brettern hellgrünes Gras / The Green Green Gras Beneath, Austria 2005, 52 min. [Navigator Film]

Stojka is featured in the 2013 documentary film Forget Us Not, which follows several non-Jewish survivors of the Holocaust.

== Art ==
Stojka began painting at the age of 56 using unconventional painting implements like her fingers and toothpicks. She worked with "everything that comes between [her] fingers," including cardboard, glass jars, postcards, and salt dough.

Her work is rooted in German expressionism and folk art and depicts the death camps as well as "idyllic" pictures of family life in their painted wagon before the Holocaust. A 2014 retrospective exhibition "We Were Ashamed" described her body of work as two cycles. The first, titled "Even Death is Afraid of Auschwitz," depicts her memories of concentration camps, and is composed primarily of black and white ink drawings and comparatively few oil paintings. The second "Bright Cycle" involves colorful oil paintings of nature, landscapes, Roma wagons, dance, and family.

Her art has been exhibited throughout Europe, in Japan and in the United States.

She also released a CD of Lovara Romani songs titled Me Diklem Suno ("I dreamt").

In 2018 the Ceija Stojka International Fund was created to contribute to the knowledge and international influence of the work of Ceija Stojka (1933-2013). The exhibitions in France (Marseille, Paris) “Ceija Stojka, a Roma artist in the century” produced by Lanicolacheur and La maison rouge with the support of the Antoine de Galbert Foundation and the Austrian Cultural Forum inspired the creation of the Fund. The Fund gathers personalities who, since the essential encounter between Ceija Stojka and Karin Berger (author and film maker) in 1986, contribute to international recognition and promotion of her work. Ceija Stojka’s commitment as an activist, artist, and spokesperson has led to the study and the exhibition of her works in Europe, Japan, and the USA. This was made possible thanks to a number of dedicated curators, experts, scientists, and friends.

== Awards ==
- Bruno Kreisky prize for a political book for Wir leben im Verborgenen (1993)
- Joseph Felder Prize for civic merit and work in the general interest (2000)
- Gold medal of merit awarded by the Federal State of Vienna (2001)

== Works ==
- Wir leben im Verborgenen. Erinnerungen einer Rom-Zigeunerin - translated as "We Live in Seclusion. The Memories of a Romni" (1988)
- Reisende auf dieser Welt - translated as "Travellers on This World" (1992)
- Meine Wahl zu schreiben - ich kann es nicht (2003 - Gedichte)
- Me Diklem Suno "I dreamt" (Audio-CD)
- Träume ich, dass ich lebe? Befreit aus Bergen-Belsen - translated as "I Dream That I am Alive - Liberated From Bergen-Belsen" (2005)
- Auschwitz ist mein Mantel (monograph with drawings, paintings and poems, ed. Christa Stippinger, 2008)
- Sogar der Tod hat Angst vor Auschwitz (monograph in German, English, Romanes with drawings, gouaches, paintings, ed. Lith Bahlmann, Matthias Reichelt, 2014)
- Ceija Stojka. Une artiste rom dans le siecle. A Roma artist in the century (monograph in French, English with drawings, gouaches, paintings, ed. Maison Rouge,2018)
