= Juana la Macarrona =

Spanish flamenco dancer (1870–1947)

Juana la Macarrona (3 May 1870 – 17 April 1947) was a Spanish flamenco dancer (bailaora).

Born Juana Vargas de las Heras in Jerez de la Frontera in Andalusia, she later added the stage name La Macarrona. Her Gitano parents started her on her dancing career, which lasted well into the twentieth century.

== Renown as bailaora ==
=== Early career ===
Her mother was Ramona de las Heras Valencia, a flamenco singer, her father Juan de Vargas Barrío, a flamenco guitarist. At the age of seven Juana began dancing in the streets to their accompaniment, hers being a flamenco family. Among Juana's gypsy ancestors was Josefa Vargas, also a bailaora. More distant ancestors were among the earliest flamenco performers known. María Vargas, Juana's sister, was the lesser-known dancer María La Macarrona. Juana landed her first regular job at a café cantante in Sevilla, but she earned more in the streets by the equivalent of "passing the hat". Later she danced beside the singer El Mezcle at a flamenco café in Málaga.

At about the age of 16 Juana was "discovered" by Silverio Franconetti, the legendary flamenco cantaor, at whose Café Silverio in Sevilla she then danced. Quickly La Macarrona became a well-known bailaora throughout Spain, dancing in company with the best flamenco performers (singers, dancers, guitarists) at well-known café cantantes. By the early 1890s Juana was appearing at illustrious venues in Paris, and elsewhere in Europe. Entertained were several "zares de Russia", a "shah de Persia", various "reyes, principes y duques", as well as "señoríos" and "comerciantes". La Macarrona performed her baile at the 1889 Exposition Universelle in Paris. Not yet thirty, she had attracted wealth and fame.

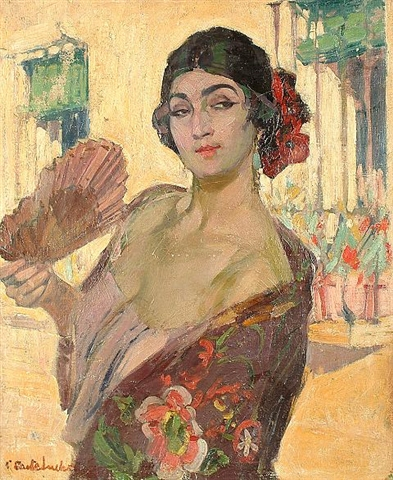
Flamenco dancer by Castelucho (c.1905).

=== Her flamenco style ===
From reports of her performances, La Macarrona followed a style then considered traditional. Her baile directed attention to the upper torso, with movements of the arms and of the hands. These brazos y manos she did knowingly, aware, with a delightful ease she displayed her strength. The bata de cola she moved beautifully, impeccably. According to a flamenco writer, her zapateado accents were dramatic and sharp.

About the footwork then current among flamenco bailaoras, there is a disputed issue. Some assert that today the zapateado is more developed, others disagree. A contemporary describes her spell over an audience.

The people are silent, holding their breaths with an almost religious fervor, while the feet of La Macarrona give rhythm to her dance. The chords of the guitar have little value now. Because La Macarrona dances to the compás of her own magnificent footwork."

Juana Vargas la Macarrona "poseía una asombrosa flexibilidad en los movimientos del cuerpo y dominaba el manejo de la bata de cola que enroscaba a sus pies después de dar las vueltas con encreíble maestría." She favored the soleares, the alegrías, and bailes "festeros" (festive dances). By eye-witness accounts La Macarrona was "a fireball, her dance full of gypsy temperament." It is said "her duende was exceptional."

=== Personality ===
She also became known to aficionados for quotable, impromptu expressions. For example, after performing with flamencos often in Paris Juana had become familiar with speaking French. On a later trip north from Spain, she was asked to make arrangements when the train reached Paris. Upon arrival, for whatever reason, nobody seemed able to understand her. She explained, "It's not that my French isn't good, it's just that they've changed the damned language since I was here last."

=== The crown of fame ===
La reina

In the flamenco cafés she remained in demand for decades. Juana "es la que hace muchos años reina en el arte de bailer flamenco". Her moves elicited 'lightning and thunder'.

Ballets Russses in Sevilla

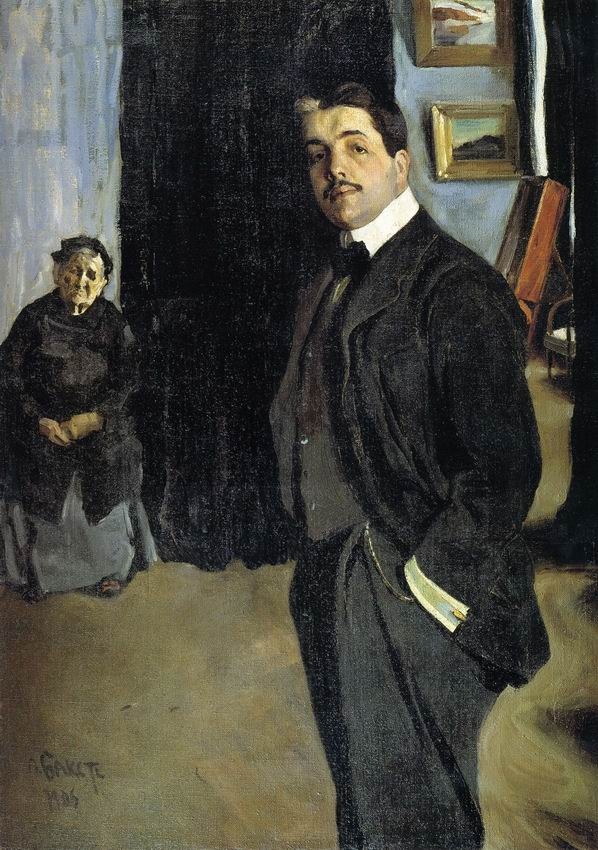
Portrait of Diaghilev, by Bakst (1906).

Her reputation in international dance was correspondingly high, no less in the world of ballet and classical music. Four well-known traveling companions saw her dance, circa 1917: the impresario Serge Diaghilev, the composer Manuel de Falla, the choreographer and dancer Léonide Massine, and the bailaor Felix Fernandez García.

"In Seville we went to see Ramirez and Macarrona, the two outstanding flamenco dancers of the day. Their dancing more than lived up to our expectations, and we were dazzled by the ferocious power and elegance of their performance."

The "Ramirez" mentioned with La Macarrona is probably Antonio López Ramírez or "Ramirito" (1885–1930).

La poesía

Onstage her stage presence captured the hearts of many audiences. She was known for the grace, fluidity, and emotional depth portrayed in her performances. La Macarrona "le injertó al baile una antiquísima fuerza emotiva, llena de feminidad y gracia, como en los soleares de su creación. ... Y por la cintura, por los brazos, le subía el chorro de la danza... ."

== Her stage name ==
La Macarrona was her stage name of Juana Vargas. The name is said to be taken from two flamenco ancestors of Juana Vargas. Each named Macarrón, they flourished in the 18th century: Tío Juan Macarrón and Tío Vicente Macarrón. Juana's family was long accustomed to performing the flamenco arts. Her namesake Tío Juan Macarrón of Jerez de la Frontera is described as being a cantaor (flamenco singer) of 18th-century Spain and "Uno de más antiguos intérpreters conocidos" (One of the earliest flamenco interpreters known). Of another of her namesakes, Tío Vicente Maccarón, an equal antiquity and rôle is referenced.

Macarrona in English would mean "macaroni or macaroon". In addition to the foods, the word "macaroni" in 18th century England also signified an "English dandy... who affected foreign mannerisms and fashions." This second meaning originally derived from Italian, and is retained in the Spanish cognate "macarronea" [English: "macarronic"], which currently is defined as "burlesque verse" mixing "real or coined words from two or more languages." So that, if in itself it carries a meaning in addition to family ancestry, La Macarrona could mean "exotic talker", analogous to how she dances, also fitting her knack for off-stage humor. La Macarrona could advertise her being a "dandy" of the flamenco arts.

== Later years in flamenco ==
Juana la Macarrona when fifty (in 1910) established a permanent home in Sevilla. In 1922 she was a judge at the Concurso de Cante Jondo in Granada (see below). In 1931 Juana danced in the motion picture Violetas Imperiales directed by Henry Roussel. In a trio of elder dancers, Juana performed on stage in the 1933 El Amor Brujo. Also in 1933, and in 1940, she toured with the stage show Las Calles de Cádiz.

She was able to extend her dancing career well past sixty. "Such was her dominance in the dance that in the 1920s, when she was in her sixties, she still drew crowds as a headliner in the major cabarets of Sevilla and Madrid." In part, however, she performed out of necessity, caused by the loss of much of her wealth in a house break-in. Stolen was a small fortune in "cash and jewels". Eventually, however, her cafés-cantantes era fame had faded; she then mostly performed in colmaos (flamenco taverns) and ventas in Sevilla. "Occasionally benefits would be held in her honor".

When she was seventy-five, she gave a newspaper interview in Sevilla. She lamented the decline of flamenco. "Ni en los cafés nos quieren ya, cuando hemos sío siempre las reinas der mundo. Pero to lo acaba er tiempo."

La Macarrona had taught "droves" of younger dancers. Among them was Teresita España, who she considered turned out the best. Also her student was Florencia Pérez Padilla, the Rosario of the performing pair "Rosario and Antonio".

=== Concurso de Cante Jondo ===
In 1922 Juana appeared at the Concurso de Cante Jondo held in Granada. This event, promoted by composer Manuel de Falla and poet Federico García Lorca, was chiefly a contest for amateur flamenco artists, but it also attracted veteran performers. Honored as a judge for the contest, in that role La Macarrona joined three other stars of flamenco, the cantaores Antonio Chacón and Manuel Torre, and the cantaora La Niña de los Peines. Juana's presence richly animated the Concurso festivities, for one, by her excited jaleo cries of "¡Lapoteosis!" ["Thunderstrike!"] Later the maestra herself danced, to a trio of guitarists including Ramón Montoya, while the young Manolo Caracol sang, and Gitanas of the Sacromonte punctuated the music with their palmas. Eduardo Molina Fajardo writes:

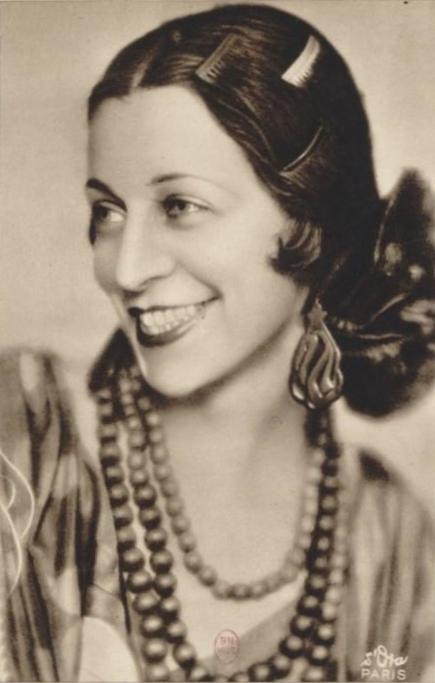
La Argentina

"La Macarrona, flexible como si se hubiera quedado plantada en sus enolvidables dieciséis años, se hizo una diosa de rito antiguo, lleno de parsimonia y de misterio, que luego recobraba ardor y acelerado ritmo. Su traje de flamenca se transformaba en ola, en viento, en flor."

Antonia Mercé "La Argentina" attended the Concurso. A bailaora herself, she turned her admiring gaze to La Macarrona as she performed the flamenco arts. When Juana sat afterward La Argentina came to her, and gently knelt down at the feet of the goddess! Carefully, perhaps a bit mischievously, she took off La Macarrona's dancing shoes. Then carried them away.

=== El Amor Brujo ===
In 1933 Manuel de Falla's ballet composition El Amor Brujo (Love the Magician) was re-staged in Cádiz, accentuating its flamenco roots. Produced by Encarnación López (La Argentinita), it "stressed the folkloric elements of the music and, as a result, was more 'flamenco' than other versions."

Three elders of flamenco dance, La Macarrona, La Malena, and Fernanda Antúnez, were featured. They played in roles of the brujas (the three sorcerers) during "the scenes in the gipsy caves". At the end the three also danced an alegrías. The show starred flamenco dancers Vicente Escudero, Pilar López, Rafael Ortega, Antonio de Triana, as well as La Argentinita. The poet García Lorca attended the "triumphant" first performance, which was dedicated to him. This production of El Amor Brujo was said to facilitate "the birth of Ballet Español". After opening in Cádiz (de Falla's birthplace), La Macarrona with the other brujas went on the show's tour of Spain.

=== Carmen Amaya ===
In early 1936 the bailaoras La Macarrona and La Malena had a memorable, emotional meeting with the rising international star of flamenco dance, Carmen Amaya (1913–1963). Her reputation already reached to the Americas, and she'd been featured in commercial films. The occasion was a performance by Amaya with the cuadro 'Salón Variedades' in Sevilla. The meeting was said to be "one of the great moments" in Amaya's life. During those years the two elder gypsy dancers were being celebrated as "the most famous in the grand old style of the jondo dance." Both "full of years and infirmities" they were yet "basking in the admiration and homage of the Sevilla public, that loved them dearly."

Guitars began the flamenco event, for a soleares danced solo by Carmen Amaya. The magic hush of the audience inspired Carmen.

Soon her demons took hold of her. 'And, Good Lord, what broke loose there!' La Macarrona and La Malena were on their feet, crying. It was a dream: they had come back to life in the person of Carmen.

In the "magic circle of flamenco art" a new star began to shine. Macarrona suddenly cried out, "You are the Queen!" The audience laughed, stirred, murmured... clapped in rhythm. All the while they shouted encouragement, various jaleos to Carmen who kept on dancing, her eyes wet, "full of tears". She'd be the new Faraona of the baile, the new Pharaoh of dance.

=== Las Calles de Cádiz ===
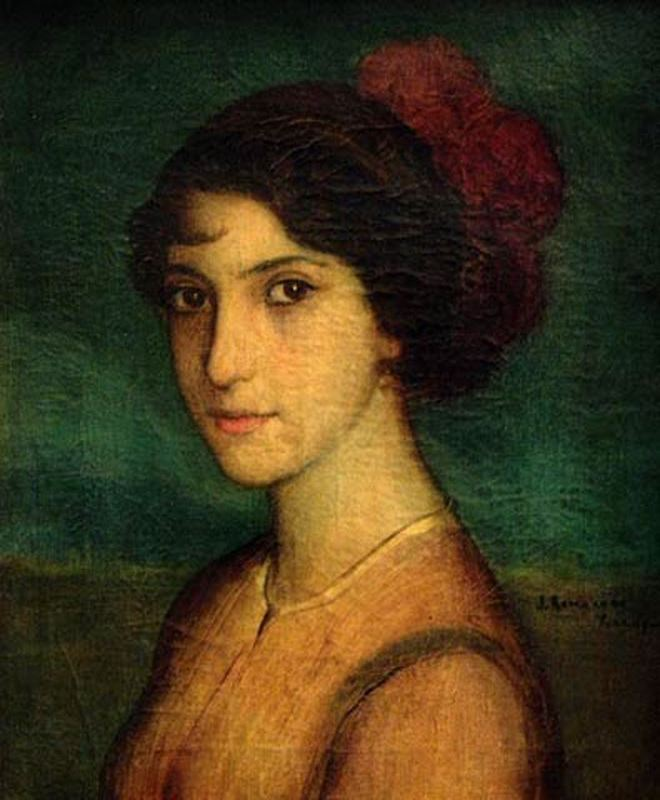
La Argentinita, by Julio Romero de Torres

In 1933 and again in 1940, La Macarrona toured with the celebrated stage show "Las Calles de Cádiz" (The Streets of Cádiz). It was another production by Encarnación López "La Argentinita", then in the flower of her career. She played a leading role, too, in the musical show. During this era, flamenco song and dance was often moved from the café venue into the theater.

In Las Calles de Cádiz, "the colorful life of the barrio Santa María" was brought to the stage. The flamenco artists played a variety of city characters, while occasionally performing the art's song and dance accompanied by guitarists. This Cádiz barrio was then an entertainment spot, with "tiendas de montañés (grocery store-bar combinations) open all night" and streets full of aficionados. The lively show included well-known singers and tocaors of the guitar. Also featured for flamenco nostalgia were veteran dancers, the stars La Macarrona and three other elder bailaoras, whose pure flamenco continued to draw olés and other cries of appreciation. The roles they played were brujas (sorcerers). Las Calles de Cádiz of 1933 is said to have been "the high point of theatrical flamenco." In 1940 La Macarrona did this show again, produced by Conchita Piquer.

== Flamenco memory ==
In 1947 La Macaronna died in Sevilla. It was at a time when the flamenco arts in general had suffered a loss of popularity. Hence the once well-known bailaora passed from the scene "poor and forgotten". She herself thought her beloved flamenco was dying. "Los niños modernos, la juventú, nos mira como cosas raras, sin pensá que hemos jecho yorá con nuestras gitanerías a tre generaciones."

Yet a decade later the flamenco arts were experiencing a grand renaissance, in which Juana Vargas as La Macarrona was well remembered. Years earlier, in 1935, Ferdinando el de Triana, a flamenco cantaor, had written: "Everything that can be said about La Macarrona is not enough." She is "appraised by many as the greatest female flamenco dancer of all times. Others claim she was the greatest of her epoch."

== See also ==
- Flamenco dance
- Carmen Amaya
- Silverio Franconetti
- Café Cantante
- Concurso de Cante Jondo: Events of the Concurso
- La Argentina
- La Argentinita
- Women in dance
