= Niño Ricardo =

Spanish flamenco musician (1904–1972)

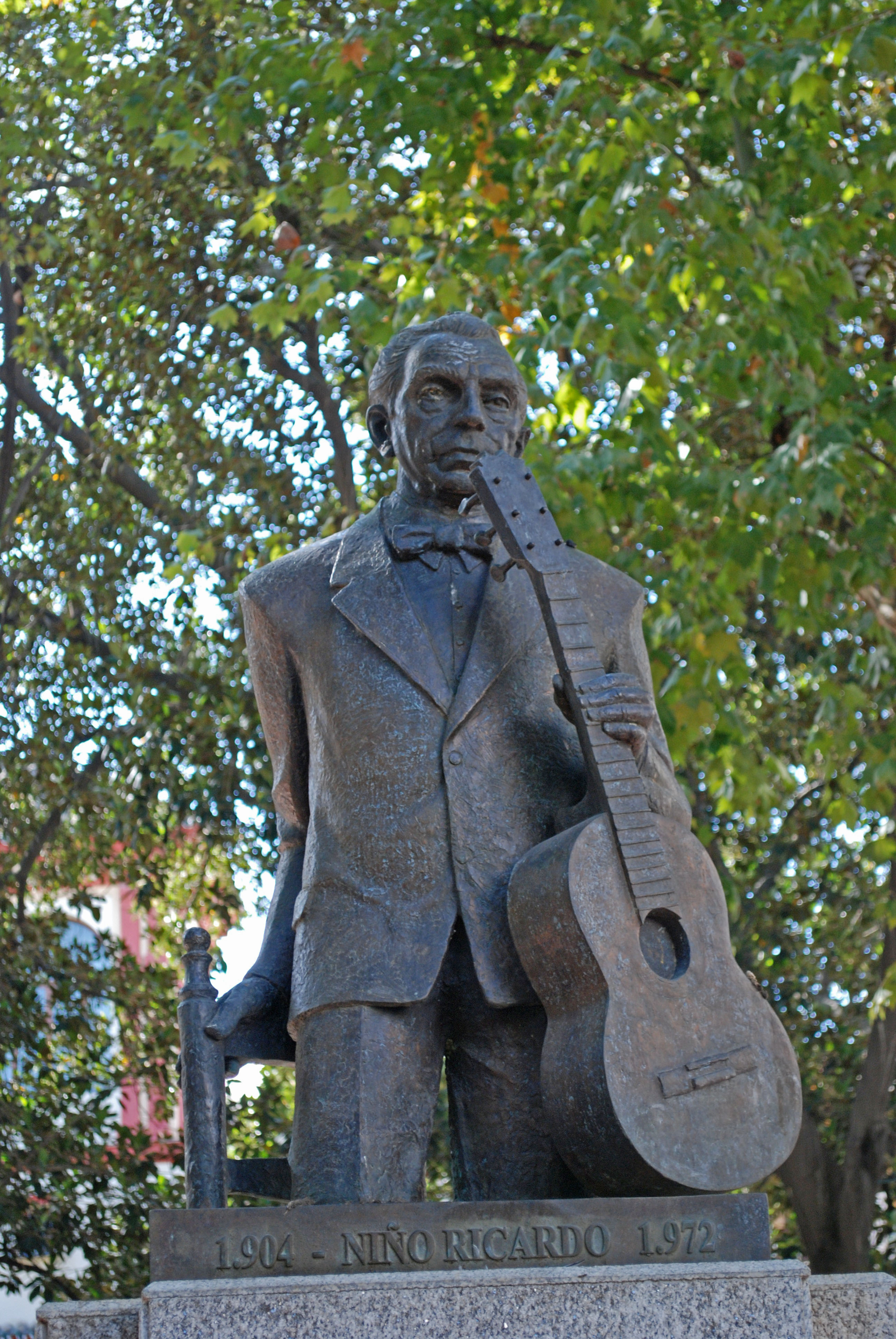
- Statue of Niño Ricardo. Cristo de Burgos Square. Seville.

Background information
- Born: Manuel Serrapí Sánchez; 11 July 1904; Seville, Spain
- Died: 14 April 1972 (aged 67)
- Genres: Flamenco
- Occupation: Flamenco guitarist
- Instrument: flamenco guitar

Manuel Serrapí Sánchez (11 July 1904 – 14 April 1972), better known as Niño Ricardo, was a Flamenco composer, considered by some sources as the most accomplished flamenco player of his day. He played a significant part in the evolution of the flamenco guitar. He lived in the city center of Sevilla. A child guitar prodigy, his early audiences referred to him as the son of Ricardo, leading to his stage-name Niño [de] Ricardo.

== Early years ==
He was born on July 11, 1904 on Almudena Street of the Plaza de Argüelles in Seville (today Plaza del Cristo de Burgos), in Spain, in a typical neighborhood at that time. The facade of a hotel is dedicated to Niño Ricardo with a commemorative plaque.

Ricardo Serrapí Torres, guitarist and father of Niño Ricardo along with Antonio Moreno, a friend of the father, taught and introduced young Ricardo to the world of flamenco when he was 13 years old. Like his father, he did not want to play professionally.

Javier Molina, guitarist born in Jerez, was the one who gave the first opportunity to Niño Ricardo, at 14 years of age, to perform in a flamenco show, where he met singers whom he later accompanied both in Spain and beyond, and concert performance continued uninterrupted for the rest of his life. His career began in 1924 by accompanying La Niña de los Peines and at the age of 20 he began recording on his own.

== Playing style ==
His fingernails grew in a peculiar upward curve, a fact that influenced his playing style and tone. After a throat operation in 1945, he acquired a deep, raspy voice that is audible on recordings in which he hums along and offers encouraging remarks to the singer.

His bright chord arrangements with the left hand together with his creative genius made for his own unique falsetas (improvisations). His right hand was unique in its constant manipulation of the strings and insistent rhythmic counterpoint. The Ricardo touch carried such musical motivation that many singers acknowledged they never sang better than with his accompaniment. He also loved accompaniment and was fond of singing before a concert with his guitar and because he sang to his guitar, he encouraged others to join in.

He claimed that the guitar was his religion. He said the guitar with singing, should carry on a dialogue: "Neither should the singing silence the guitar nor the guitar obscure the passage of the cante (singing)". Flamenco guitar would not be what it is, if it were not for the Master.. The totally new style he developed revolutionized the guitar, creating a school called the 'Ricardismo' (very much Ricardo). He introduced a new challenge to the art of flamenco guitar playing at the time.

== Musical influences ==
Ricardo was influenced by fellow flamenco players, including: Pinto, Torre, El Niño Gloria, Escacena, and Antonio Mairena. He spent his early years playing in the taverns and bars of Seville where he developed his own personal style and created much of his own material. He was inspired by the great threesome of flamenco guitar; Ramón Montoya, Manolo de Huelva, and Javier Molina, by whom he was guided at the start of his professional career in the Salon Variedades in Seville. Ricardo recorded with many singers, including Pastora, El Carbonerillo, Mazaco, Antonio and Manuel Mairena, Fernanda y Bernarda, Caracol and Talega.

== Personal life ==
He married Lola Siguenza in his early twenties and had two children with her. He reportedly had several affairs with other women while touring, thus there are two more children of whom he is considered to be the father.

In 1945 he underwent throat surgery that left him with a deep voice, although this did not prevent him from continuing his career; he is easily recognized in the recordings where one can hear him humming along as he plays.

== Death ==
Niño Ricardo died of cirrhosis of the liver in 1972 at the age of 67. A monument exists at his grave in the Cemetery of San Fernando in Sevilla. It represents an angel lifting a guitar to Heaven. It is the work of sculptor Sandino and was funded with revenues from sales of a tribute album they recorded in 1972, in which a group of recording artists such as Paco de Lucia, Sabicas and Ricardo's son performed songs by Ricardo. In 2004, celebrations of the 100 years since the birth of Niño Ricardo were held in southern Spain. In 2005, they raised a monument and a plaque in the Plaza del Cristo de Burgos, near where Ricardo was born.

== Legacy ==
According to the book "Flamenco: Gypsy Dance and Music from Andalusia" by Claus Schreiner, the period after the Spanish Civil War and World War II flamenco guitar music was largely dominated by the style of performers like Niño Ricardo and Sabicas. Many modern flamenco guitarists were influenced by Ricardo such as Paco de Lucia, Paco Peña and Juan Martín.

He taught many guitarists of the era such as Paco de Lucía, Enrique de Melchor, and Serranito. Paco de Lucia said on several occasions that the Niño Ricardo "was the reigning master of the guitar of our generation. He represented the ultimate in flamenco guitar, the Godfather. We learned a lot from him and tried to copy it."

He recorded with some of the best known singers of the time, such as Porrina de Badajoz, la Niña de los Peines, Pastora, Tomás, Pepe Pinto, Gloria, Vallejo, El Carbonerillo, Mazaco, Antonio Chacón, Manuel Mairena, Fernanda y Bernarda, Caracol y Talega, although he considered Manuel Torre his favorite. He toured with them during the 1940s, and in concert with Sabicas in Mexico in 1949.

He created compositions for many singers like Juanito Valderrama, for whom he composed his biggest hit, "El emigrante" ("The Emigrant") and "El rey de la carretera" (King of the Road") among others.

== Partial filmography ==
- Niño Ricardo appears in many episodes of NODO.
- Café de Chinitas, where he also speaks.
- El Rey de la Carretera. (The King of the Road.) (1956)
- Puente de Coplas

== Partial discography ==
Many LPs and slate recordings have disappeared; however, some CDs are still available, and one can hear Ricardo in the "Masters of flamenco guitar" collection. Many of the recordings from Ricardo's first period, which showed the growth of his musical personality, have been lost. Some existing copies belong to fans and collectors. Presently, there exists the following discs on solo guitar or accompanying singers.

=== Solo guitar ===
Title
El genio de Niño Ricardo
Grandes Figuras del Flamenco (Vol. 11). Niño Ricardo
Toques Flamencos de Guitarra. Historia del Flamenco. Niño Ricardo
Recital de guitarra flamenca

=== Composer and accompanist ===
Title
Grandes maestros de la Guitarra Flamenca. Vol. 2
Maestros de la guitarra flamenca Vol. 2
Rito y geografía del toque. Vol.1
Pa saber de guitarra
Grandes maestros de la Guitarra Flamenca. Vol. 1
Cantes Gitanos, La Niña de los Peines
Cantaores de Época. Campanilleros y otros éxitos
Antología "La época dorada del flamenco". Vol. 42
Rito y geografía del toque. Colección completa.
Por Siguiriyas
Los cantes hispanoamericanos en el mundo del flamenco
Antología "la época dorada del flamenco". Vol. 21
Antología "La época dorada del flamenco". Vol. 39
Antología "La época dorada del flamenco". Vol. 40
Por Malagueñas, Granaínas y Media Granaína
Maestros de la guitarra flamenca Vol. 6
Rito y geografía del baile Vol 4.
Grabaciones discos pizarra. 1930 - 1940. La Niña de los Peines
Antología del cante flamenco. Flamencología Vol. 2
Maestros de la guitarra flamenca Vol. 8
Villancicos Flamencos. Grabaciones de Discos de Pizarra año 1930-50. Vol 1
Grandes Maestros del flamenco
Maestros del cante flamenco Vol. 2
Homenaje al Niño Ricardo in memoriam
Cantaores de Época Vol. 3
Grabaciones discos pizarra. 1930. Carbonillero
Grabaciones discos pizarra. 1930 - 1950. Niña de la Puebla
Antología "la época dorada del flamenco". Vol. 10
Antología del cante flamenco. Flamencología Vol. 4
Antología del cante Flamenco. Flamencología Vol. 7
Antología "la época dorada del flamenco". Vol. 23
Cinco guitarras históricas
Antología "la época dorada del flamenco". Vol. 4
Antología "la época dorada del flamenco". Vol. 24
Flamenco Histórico. Vol. 8
Antología "la época dorada del flamenco". Vol. 5
Los ases del flamenco. Vol. 1.
Grabaciones discos pizarra. 1930. Canalejas de Puerto Real
Arte Flamenco Vol. 13 Nostalgia (Años 30)
Grabaciones discos pizarra. 1935 - 1950. Juanito Valderrama
Grabaciones discos pizarra. 1930 - 1940. Pepe Pinto
Antología "la época dorada del flamenco". Vol. 8
Antología del cante flamenco. Flamencología Vol. 5
Antología "la época dorada del flamenco". Vol 17
Gabriel Moreno - Lo aflamencado. Flamencos en los archivos de RTVE. Vol. 11
Vol.1. Grabaciones de 1920-1940
Antología "La época dorada del flamenco". Vol. 3
Antología "la época dorada del flamenco". Vol. 9
Maestros del cante flamenco Vol. 1
Figuras del cante jondo, El Niño de Gloria
Antología "la época dorada del flamenco". Vol. 25
Cantes antiguos del flamenco, Enrique Morente
Antología del cante flamenco. Flamencología volumen 6
Copa Pavón y Llave de Oro del Cante Manuel Vallejo
Grabaciones discos pizarra. 1930 - 1940 - 1950. Manolo Caracol
El cante flamenco de Manolo Caracol
Primeras grabaciones 1924 - 1934 Niño de Marchena
Flamenco Histórico. Vol. 9
Antología "la época dorada del flamenco". Vol. 7
Copa Pavón y Llave de Oro del Cante. Vol. 2
Cantaores de época. Pepe Marchena. Vol 6
La Niña de los Peines y Manuel Vallejo
Antología Manolo Caracol
Early Cante Flamenco
Grabaciones discos pizarra. 1945 - 1950. Porrina de Badajoz
Flamenco viejo. Vol. III
El cante flamenco de Canalejas de Puerto Real
Cantaores de Época: Pepe Pinto / Niña de los Peines
Antología de guitarristas flamencos
La Perla de Triana y Familia. Grabaciones privadas 1964 - 1968
Niño de Marchena. Vol.1
El cante flamenco de Manuel Vallejo
Cátedra del Cante Vol. 38. El Chato de las Ventas
Cátedra del Cante Vol. 28. José Cepero
Cátedra del Cante Vol. 14. Niño Gloria
