= Cante flamenco =

Flamenco singing

The cante flamenco (Spanish pronunciation: [ˈkante flaˈmeŋko]; lit. 'flamenco singing') is one of the three main components of flamenco, along with toque ('playing', i.e. the guitar) and baile ('dance'). Because the dancer is front and center in a flamenco performance, inexperienced observers often assume the dance is the most important aspect of the art form — in fact, it is the cante which is the heart and soul of the genre. A cante singer is called a cantaor or cantaora.

The cante flamenco is part of musical tradition in the Andalusian region of Spain. Its origins are uncertain but scholars see many influences in it, including the traditional song of the gitanos (Spanish Gypsies), the Perso-Arab Zyriab song form, the classical Andalusian orchestras of the Islamic Empire, the Jewish synagogue chants, Mozarabic forms such as zarchyas and zambra, Arabic zayal (the foundation for the Fandango), and Andalusian regional folk forms, as well as West African and South American influences as seen in the cantes de ida y vuelta. Flamenco embodies a wealth of musical cultures — Roma, Arab, Berber, Jewish, and Christian.

Flamenco developed into its definitive form during its "Golden Age" between 1869 and 1910. Beginning in 1910, cante flamenco was popularized by the opera flamenca which included the lighter forms of flamenco such as fandangos and cantes de ida y vuelta. In order to preserve the "authentic" cante jondo (deep song), Manuel de Falla and Federico García Lorca organized the Concurso de Cante Jondo in Granada in 1922. Singers from all over Andalusia travelled to join in the competition. The first two prizes went to El Tenazas and El Caracol.

== Types of cante ==
There are many variants of cantes or palos (song forms), each expressing a unique emotion (which shares noticeable resemblance to Indian classical music). The flamenco songs of today may be classified into one of three categories: cante grande, cante intermedio or cante chico.

=== Cante Grande ===
Also known as cante jondo and sometimes referred to as cante gitano. Meaning "profound" and "deep," this intensely sad form of cante deals with themes of death, anguish, despair, or religious sentiments and may be sung a palo seco (without guitar accompaniment). Major forms are the tonás, martinetes, seguiriya, soleá, and carcelera. It is said that cante jondo (deep song) is the heart and soul of flamenco:

The singer who sings seguiriyas leaves in each line of the copla (verse of cante) a piece of his soul; and, if not, he is deceiving the listener, perhaps even himself. If there is one style to which the singer has to give everything, has to give every bit of himself, it is the siguiriya. I have seen José Menese completely overcome, broken, a literal wreck after doing this song and I believe that if the singer sometimes reaches the kind of state of grace that the Gypsies call duende - and I don't know yet what that is - it is in these unique and unrepeatable moments.

— Ángel Álvaro Caballero, Historia del Cante Flamenco

Sample Seguiria describing anguish in Caló, Spanish and English:

Caló	Andalusian	English
Ducas tenela min dai	Penas tiene mi mare	My mother has her troubles
ducas tenelo yo	penas tengo yo	and I have mine
las de min dai yo sieno	y las que siento son las de mi mare	my mother's are the ones I feel
las de mangue no.	que las mis no.	not my own.

=== Cante Intermedio ===
Meaning "intermediate," this form is less profound but also moving, sometimes containing an oriental cast to the music. The term (between cante chico and cante grande that is) varies according to who is singing and describing the "cante intermedio".

=== Cante Chico ===
Literally meaning "little song," this form of cante sings of lighter subjects including love, bawdy humor and happiness to the accompaniment of the flamenco guitar. Festive forms of cante chico include forms such as the alegrías, bulerías and tangos.

== Other classifications of cante flamenco ==
=== Cante Gitano ===
Cante gitano (or the "Gypsy song") refers to the original songs believed to be developed by Gypsies who immigrated in the 15th century. These include the toná, soleá, seguiriya, tango and buleria.

=== Cante Andaluz ===
Cante andaluz began to spread during the middle of the 19th century, and is a combination of other forms of folkloric music from Andalusia which demonstrate a definite influence of Gypsy flamenco music. Cante andaluz genres include the many variations of the fandango and cantinas.

=== Cantes Folklóricos Aflamencados ===
The styles of cantes folklóricos aflamencados are forms of cante that are not considered to be true forms of flamenco by the purists. Examples of these styles include the sevillanas, Farruca, Garrotin, and the Cuban Rumba. These are the folk song and dances from Andalusia, other Spanish provinces including Galicia and Asturias, as well as South America which have been slightly influenced by traditional flamenco forms.

=== Lorqueña ===
Lorqueña is a "aflamencado" that has been made from certain ancient folk songs based on the poems of Federico García Lorca. The poet himself collected these folk songs that were included gypsies and flamenco lyrics and gathered in his collection of ancient popular songs. Among these traditional songs were the tunes, bulerías, jaleos and seguidillas that Lorca himself recorded in 1931 accompanying the famous singer "La Argentinita" with the piano. The lorqueña comes from Granada and is based on the bulería style. The gypsy Pastora María Pavón Cruz known as "La Niña de los Peines" was a very famous cantaora flamenca from Seville. She took the poems of Federico García Lorca as lyrics of new songs and was the first person to call it Lorqueña.

==== Titles ====
- En el café de Chinitas ('At Chinitas Cafe')
- Anda jaleo ('Come Rise Up')
- Esquilones de Plata ('Silver Bells')

== Famous cantaores ==
=== El Planeta (Antonio Fernández) ===
Although concrete information about El Planeta is scarce, it is thought he was born around 1770 in Cádiz. He is widely acknowledged as the first famous performer of the cante flamenco. Originally a blacksmith, El Planeta soon became a renowned leader within the Gypsy community, bearing the honorary title of "Count and Prince of the Fraternity." It is believed he usually sang unaccompanied, although he sometimes accompanied himself on the guitar. The oldest siguiriyas in recorded flamenco history are those of El Planeta. He died around 1850, most likely in or around Seville.

=== El Fillo (Francisco Ortega Vargas) ===
Born around 1820 in Villa Real, El Fillo was the chosen disciple of El Planeta. El Fillo was able to perform all forms of cante, and has thus been known as "the father of cante." His hoarse, harsh voice has become a defining characteristic of cante to this day - this style of singing is described as afilla in homage to him. It is believed that El Fillo died in 1878 in Seville.

=== Silverio Franconetti Aguilar ===
Born 1829, Silverio Franaconnetti was born in Morón de la Frontera was expected to enter the family tailoring business, but would escape to the nearby blacksmith to hear the gypsy singers. Here he met El Fillo and was encouraged to become a singer. He later went to Argentina and Uruguay working as a picador in the bullrings, and he also served as an officer in the Uruguay Army. Franconnetti was arguably the best non-Gypsy singer of the Nineteenth Century. He died in 1889.

=== La Niña De Los Peines (Pastora María Pavón Cruz) ===
Born in Seville in 1890, La Niña de Los Peines is regarded by some as the most exceptional and innovative female flamenco singer of all time. Affectionately called "La Niña," she was known for her interpretation of the tangos, and was often requested to sing siguiriyas at a time when women did not customarily perform it.

=== Manolo Caracol (Manuel Ortega Juárez) ===
Manolo Caracol came from an exalted Gypsy dynasty which to this day remains legendary in the arenas of both flamenco and bullfighting. Born in Seville in 1909, it is commonly believed that his ancestral lineage included both El Planeta and El Fillo. Caracol won the prestigious first prize at the Cante Jondo Competition (in 1922) at the age of only 13. During the Spanish Civil War he worked in theaters to survive. Caracol claimed his style of singing was unique. He is remembered for his capacity to evoke overwhelming passions from his listeners. Caracol frequently performed with full orchestras or pianos (much to the harsh remarks made by the purists). Caracol died at the age of sixty-four in 1973 Madrid.

=== Camarón de la Isla (José Monje Cruz) ===
Camarón de la Isla was born in San Fernando in 1950, and was the second child of eight to a Gypsy blacksmith and a basketweaver. He received his nickname Camarón (Shrimp) early on due to his thin body, light complexion and blond hair, and began performing at the age of eight. In 1969 he made his first album with Paco de Lucía. Although trained as a traditional flamenco singer, Camarón broke with convention, incorporating new musical instruments including the drums, zither, flute, moog, and keyboards to name a few. In his comparatively short career of 20 years, he and Paco de Lucía revolutionized the art of flamenco, attracting vast new audiences to the art form. Camarón met his untimely death in 1992 at the age of forty-one, in Barcelona.

=== Other famous singers of cante ===
There are many more famous and influential flamenco singers, including:

- Manuel Agujetas
- La Repompa de Malaga
- Rafael de Utrera
- Potito
- Remedios Amaya
- Diego Carrasco
- La Paquera de Jerez
- Antonio Mairena
- Diego El Cigala
- Enrique El Mellizo
- Antonio Chacon
- Manuel Torre
- Enrique El Granaino
- Pepe de Lucía
- Estrella Morente
- Lola Flores (some do not consider her a flamenco singer, although she did sing)
- Fosforito
- Lebrijano
- La Perla de Cádiz
- Terremoto de Jerez
- El Chocolate
- Manolo Leiva
- Duquende
- Pepe Marchena
- Chano Lobato
- José Mercé (who, like Camarón, started singing flamenco and then added new elements)
- Antonio Molina
- Niña Pastori
- Mayte Martín
- Juan Valderrama
- Rocio Jurado

== See also ==
- Glossary of flamenco terms
- Federico Garcia Lorca
- Flamenco Chill
- Flamenco guitar
- Paco de Lucia
- Palo (flamenco)
- New Flamenco
- Spanish translation in the Golden Age
- Category:Music of Andalusia
