= La Niña de los Peines =

Spanish flamenco singer (1890–1969)

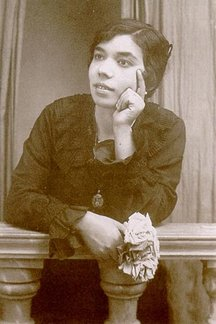
- La Niña de los Peines

Background information
- Born: Pastora Pavón Cruz; February 10, 1890; Seville, Spain
- Died: November 26, 1969 (aged 79) Seville, Spain
- Genres: Flamenco
- Occupation: Singer
- Instrument: Vocals
- Years active: 1898–1950s
- Spouse: Pepe Pinto (m. 1931–1969)

Pastora Pavón Cruz, known as La Niña de los Peines (10 February 1890 – 26 November 1969), is considered the most important woman flamenco singer of the 20th century. She was a sister of singers Arturo Pavón and Tomás Pavón, also an important flamenco singer, and aunt to Arturo Pavón, the first flamenco pianist. Both brothers, Pastora and Tomás, together with singer Manuel Torre, were the inspiring models for the next generation of singers like Antonio Mairena, Pepe de la Matrona or Fosforito, who led the movement towards the revival of traditional forms in the decades of the 1950s-1970s.

== Biography ==
Born in the famous quarter of Alameda Hércules, in Seville, she started singing for the public as at the age of 8, in the Seville Spring Fair. Later, when she was singing at Café de la Marina, a café cantante in Madrid, she acquired the nickname La Niña de los Peines (The Girl of the Combs, a nickname she never liked), as she usually sang a stanza in tangos style with the following lyrics:

Peinate tú con mis peines
Mis peines son de canela

Comb with my combs
My combs are made of cinnamon

She never learned to read or write, and only learned to sing when she was already an adult. Her family were in dire need of money, so she started to sing regularly as a professional in the Taberna de Ceferino, in Seville, and then spent a period in Madrid and Bilbao. In this town, she was not allowed to sing in public owing to her young age, so she sat as model for painter Ignacio Zuloaga. Back in Andalusia, she took part in the performances of several cafés cantante in Jerez, Seville, Málaga and other towns. In 1910 she made her first recordings, and in 1920 the Teatro Romea was paying her the highest fee it had ever paid to an artist. After that, she started a long series of tours in all Spain.

In 1922 at Granada, she participated at the Concurso de Cante Jondo. This famous music festival was largely organized by Manuel de Falla and also Federico García Lorca in order to reinvigorate the flamenco arts. She was featured as a professional performer, along with Antonio Chacón, Manuel Torre, Juana la Macarrona, Ramón Montoya and others. She was also chosen as one of the judges for the contest between non-professionals.

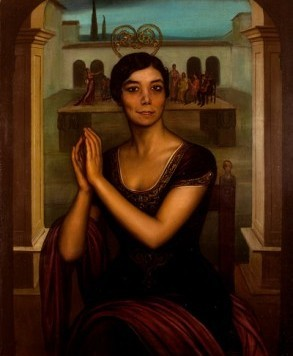
Portrait of La Niña de los Peines, painted by Julio Romero de Torres between 1917 and 1918.

Along her career she met or shared the stage with many classical flamenco singers of the Golden Age like Antonio Chacón, Manuel Torre, Francisco Lema (known as Fosforito El Viejo), La Trini, or Frijones. She had also met in 1922 Federico García Lorca, who, in a lecture given in 1933, stated:

This woman's voice is exceptional. It breaks the moulds of all singing schools, as much as she breaks the moulds of any built music. When she seems to be out of tune, she is not out of tune: on the contrary, she is incredibly in tune as, owing to the special miracle of this style and the passion with which she sings third tones and quarter tones, impossible to record on the staff. (Quoted by Antonio Reina in Museo Virtual de la Niña de los Peines)

In 1931, she married flamenco singer Pepe Pinto. After the parenthesis of the Spanish Civil War, she came back to the stage, as part of several flamenco shows, together with artists like Concha Piquer. After this, she retired for a few years, and came back with a show called España y su Cantaora (Spain and her singer), together with her husband, which she toured for a few months and was acclaimed by the critics. Then she definitely retired again. In 1961 she received an homage in Córdoba, in which several well-known flamenco artists took part, such as Antonio Mairena, Juan Talega, Manuel Morao, or Fernando Terremoto. In 1968, a monument was built in her honour in her quarter of Alameda de Hércules. In the last three years of her life, she was completely retired owing to senile dementia. She died in 1969, a month and a half after her husband. In that same year, singer Antonio Mairena recorded his album Honores a la Niña de los Peines in homage to her. In 1996, during the IX Bienal de Flamenco, the autonomous Andalusian government declared the voice of La Niña de los Peines Bien de Interés Cultural (Asset of Cultural Interest).

== Artistic legacy ==
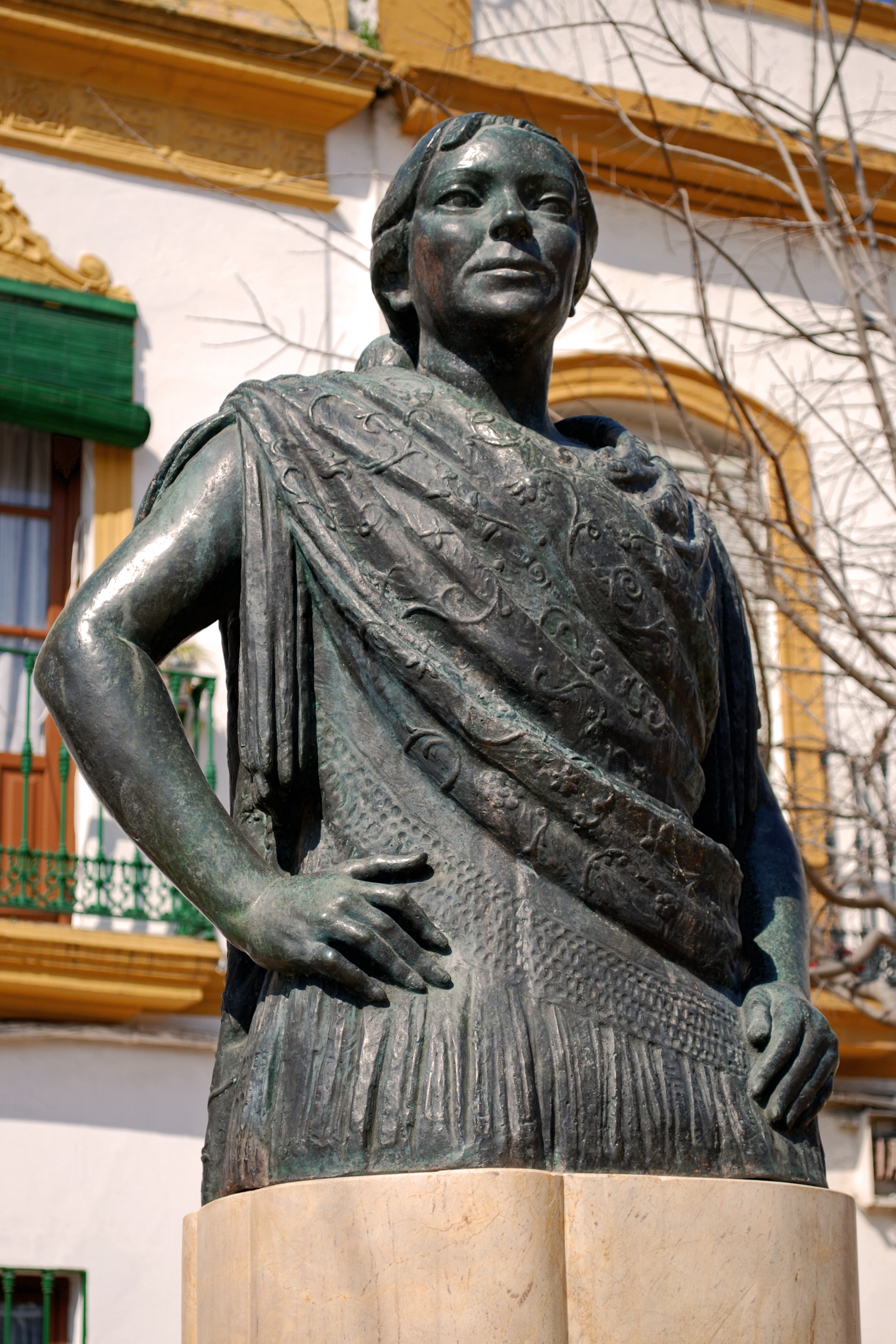
Statue of La Niña de los Peines, one of the most famous flamenco singers in Spain, known for her significant contribution to Andalusian music and copla.

A complete artist, she sang all palos to perfection, excelling especially in siguiriyas of which she preserved several styles like those of Ciego de la Peña and El Marruro, which have reached our days thanks to her. She was a direct transmitter of the soléa of La Serneta, which she learnt directly from her author, but also left memorable recordings of many other soleá styles like those of Enrique el Mellizo, Frijones or many other styles from Alcalá, Triana or Jerez.

Regarding her supremacy in tangos and tientos, as early as 1908, when she was only 18 years of age, a newspaper already stated: "La Niña de los Peines is justly reputed today as the best singer for tangos. She has a beautiful voice and a delicious style. At times, when singing, she seems to be crying" (Quoted by Ortiz Nuevo in Museo Virtual de la Niña de los Peines). Mairena and Molina ([1963] 1979:230) consider her, among the masters of tangos: "the supreme figure (...) singer and inexhaustible creator.".

Her name has become inextricably linked to the peteneras and to the bambera, a folk song she turned definitely into a flamenco palo. She was also one of the main interpreters of saetas in history: "("[As to the great interpreters of this style], in our century, Manuel Torre, Niño Gloria, Pastora Pavón, Tomás Pavón, Manuel Centeno and Manuel Vallejo." (Molina and Mairena [1963] 1979: 258).

She was a landmark in the transformation of garrotín into a completely flamenco style, and gave a definite impulse to bulerías: "Unrivalled queen of bulerías" (Molina and Mairena ([1963] 1979:263).

Critics like Molina and Mairena ([1963] 1979:305), Martín Salazar (1998) also highlight her importance for palos like malagueñas, tarantas, cartageneras or granaínas: "As we said before, Pastora was also an excellent malagueñera, who marked with her deep personality such different styles as those of Chacón, El Canario, and Fernando de Triana. She also created her own malagueña, based on the one by Maestro Ohana" (Martín Salazar 1998).

She has been accused by a few critics of having surrendered to the fashionable trends in at the time of ópera flamenca, as she recorded many examples of the so-called canción por bulerías and cantes de ida y vuelta (both condemned by purists) and took part in theatrical shows. However, she never abandoned the more traditional flamenco songs, which form the greatest part of her discography.

Even though she was a link between the traditional flamenco of the 19th century and the revival of traditional forms after the ópera flamenca period, as she kept many alive traditional songs and styles that were about to disappear, she was skeptical about the work of resurrection and classification of songs carried out by Antonio Mairena or Juan Talega. In her view, songs like the soleá de la Serneta were never the same thing in the voices of different singers, and they were but outlines used as basis for singers to improvise and create. (See Lefranc 2000: 197-198)

== Views on La Niña de los Peines ==
"In some sort of way, Pastora Pavón was a revolutionary of the flamenco song, serving as link between the traditionalism of the last century and all the modernisms the current one, even the most detestable, which she did not reject without experimenting on them first, assimilating and enlarging everything that had some valuable element." (Álvarez Caballero 1998:249)

"We already saw, in the words of García Lorca, what La Niña de los Peines was when she sang with duende. A sombre, agonizing angel, who surpassed all measure, who embraced all emotions (…)." (Álvarez Caballero 1998:250)

"Pastora is the incarnation of flamenco singing, as Bach was of music. Geniuses of the size of this Gypsy appear in history only once in a while. She is a pontifical figure who links, through her personality, the illustrious past with the present renaissance. (...) We do not know what La Andonda, La Serrana, María Borrico, Merced la Serneta and many other famous women singers sang like, but it seems impossible that any of them surpassed Pastora Pavón in the vastness of her repertoire, the freshness of the voice, Gypsy rajo and catching vitality." (Ricardo Molina, flamecologist, quoted by Ríos Ruiz 2002:103)

"Among women, I have never known an artist like Pastora, and I think it will take centuries before her equal is born." (Pepe de la Matrona, singer, quoted by Álvarez Caballero 1998:252)

"[Referring to the singers of the ópera flamenca period] there remains, towering, as a challenging unique figure, Pastora Pavón, La Niña de los Peines, battling the fandangueros in their own territory, the theatre stages, and achieving indisputable success with the old styles of seguiriyas, soleares, malagueñas, peteneras, tarantas, tientos and bulerías." (Martín Salazar, n.d.)

"it can be assured that there has never been a more prolific and encyclopedic singer than Pastora. Nobody has had her flavour, nobody has been her equal." (Antonio Reina in Museo Virtual de la Niña de los Peines)

"Pastora Pavón Cruz, the incomparable Niña de los Peines, has probably been the greatest genius in the history of [flamenco] singing. An all-style interpreter, she completely mastered the fundamental songs (seguiriyas and soleares), the festive ones (tangos, bulerías and cantiñas), the peteneras and the cantes de Levante (malagueñas, cartageneras, tarantas and granaínas). (Martín Salazar 1998)

"With La Niña de los Peines, all discussion comes to an end: flamencologists, artists, flamenco fans, critics and everybody interested in flamenco, in general, state that she is the greatest woman singer to date." (Manuel Bohórquez, quoted by Antonio Reina in Museo Virtual de la Niña de los Peines).

== Partial discography ==
=== Complete works ===
La Niña de los peines, Patrimonio de Andalucía, Fonotrón, 2004, — The complete collection of her songs, recorded between 1910 and 1950, in 13 CDs, including CD ROM with a study of her artistic legacy. www.fonotron.com

=== Partial compilations ===
La Niña de los peines, voz de estaño fundido, Sonifolk, Madrid, 1997

La voz de interes cultural: La Niña de los Peines, Colección Quejío, EMI-Odeón, Madrid, 1997 — Partial compilation

== Sources ==
- ÁLVAREZ CABALLERO, Ángel: El cante flamenco, Alianza Editorial, Madrid, Second edition, 1998. ISBN 84-206-9682-X (First edition: 1994)
- ÁLVAREZ CABALLERO, Ángel: La Discografía ideal del cante flamenco, Planeta, Barcelona, 1995. ISBN 84-08-01602-4
- BLAS VEGA, José and RÍOS RUIZ, Manuel, Diccionario Enciclopédico Ilustrado del Flamenco, Cinterco, 1985, quoted in NIÑO DE LA ALBARIZUELA. "La Niña de los Peines". Triste y Azul. Archived from the original on 10 July 2006.
- LEFRANC, Pierre: El cante jondo, Secretariado de Publicaciones de la Universidad de Sevilla, Sevilla, 2000 ISBN 84-472-0610-6
- Ortiz nuevo, Jesús. "Rastros de Pastora recogidos en la prensa". Museo Virtual de la Niña de los Peines, section "Documentos". Centro Andaluz de Flamenco. Archived from the original on 21 November 2006.
- MARTIN SALAZAR, Jorge: Los cantes flamencos, Diputación Provincial de Granada, 1991
- MARTIN SALAZAR, Jorge: La malagueña y los cantes de su entorno, Asociación Cultural Guadalfeo, Motril, 1998 ISBN 84-923486-1-5
- REINA, Antonio. "Semblanza biográfica de la niña de los peines". Museo Virtual de la Niña de los Peines, section "Life". Centro Andaluz de Flamenco. Archived from the original on 21 November 2006.
- RÍOS RUIZ, Manuel: El gran libro del flamenco, Vol. II: Intérpretes, Calambur, Madrid, 2002. ISBN 84-88015-95-X
