= Melchor de Marchena =

Spanish flamenco guitarist

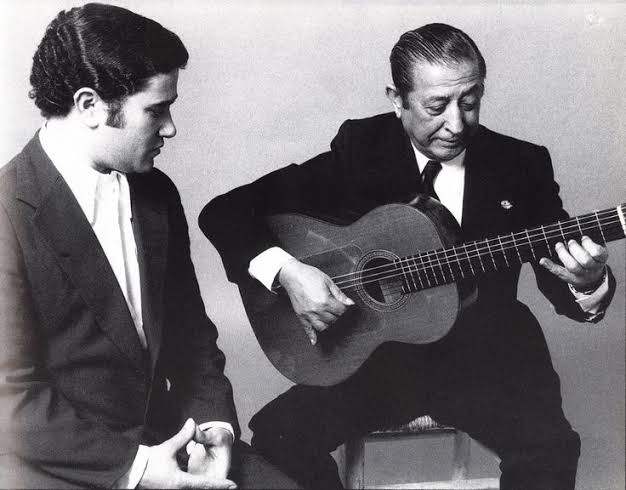
Singer José Menese and guitarist Melchor de Marchena

Melchor de Marchena (1907–1980; born Melchor Jimenez Torres) was a Spanish flamenco guitarist. Born in Marchena, Spain, he is considered to be one of the most representative artists with a "gypsy touch", along with Diego del Gastor. His love of flamenco comes from a family environment. His father, "El Lico" was a guitarist in his own right, while his mother "La Josefita", was a singer, as was one of his aunts, artistically known as "La Gilica de Marchena", who sang Soleá. Two of his brothers, Chicho Melchor and Miguel el Bizco, were also guitarists, like his son Enrique de Melchor (1950–2012), who continued the family tradition. Playing the guitar, Melchor accompanied several singers of his time, such as Manolo Caracol, La Niña de los Peines, and Antonio Mairena. In 1966, he was awarded the National Prize Flamenco Guitar, the highest award of its kind. In 1974 he performed with Paco de Lucia at the flamenco festival of La Union on the coast of eastern Spain. He died in Madrid in 1980.
