= Pablito de Cádiz =

- Born: Pablo Jiménez Pérez; 1908; Cádiz
- Died: January 24, 2004 (aged 95–96); Cádiz
- Citizenship: Spain
- Occupation: flamenco dancer

Pablo Jiménez Pérez (1908–January 24, 2004), better known as Pablito de Cádiz, was a Spanish flamenco dancer (bailaor). He was a celebrity in flamenco cafés (tablaos) with his estilos festeros (reveller styles). His brother Gineto de Cádiz was also a famous dancer, as were other members of his family.

== Biography ==
Pablo Jiménez Pérez was born in Cádiz, in the barrio of La Viña. He was the brother of Juan Jiménez Pérez (El Gineto de Cádiz) and is also related to Perla de Cádiz.

He worked along La Argentinita, joining her dance company at age 18. After the war, he performed with Canalejas de Puerto Real, Niño de Marchena, Manolo Caracol, Lola Flores and Rita Ortega; touring across Spain. He died in 2004 in Cádiz, where he had been established since 1969.
