= Concurso de Cante Jondo =

1922 Granada arts festival

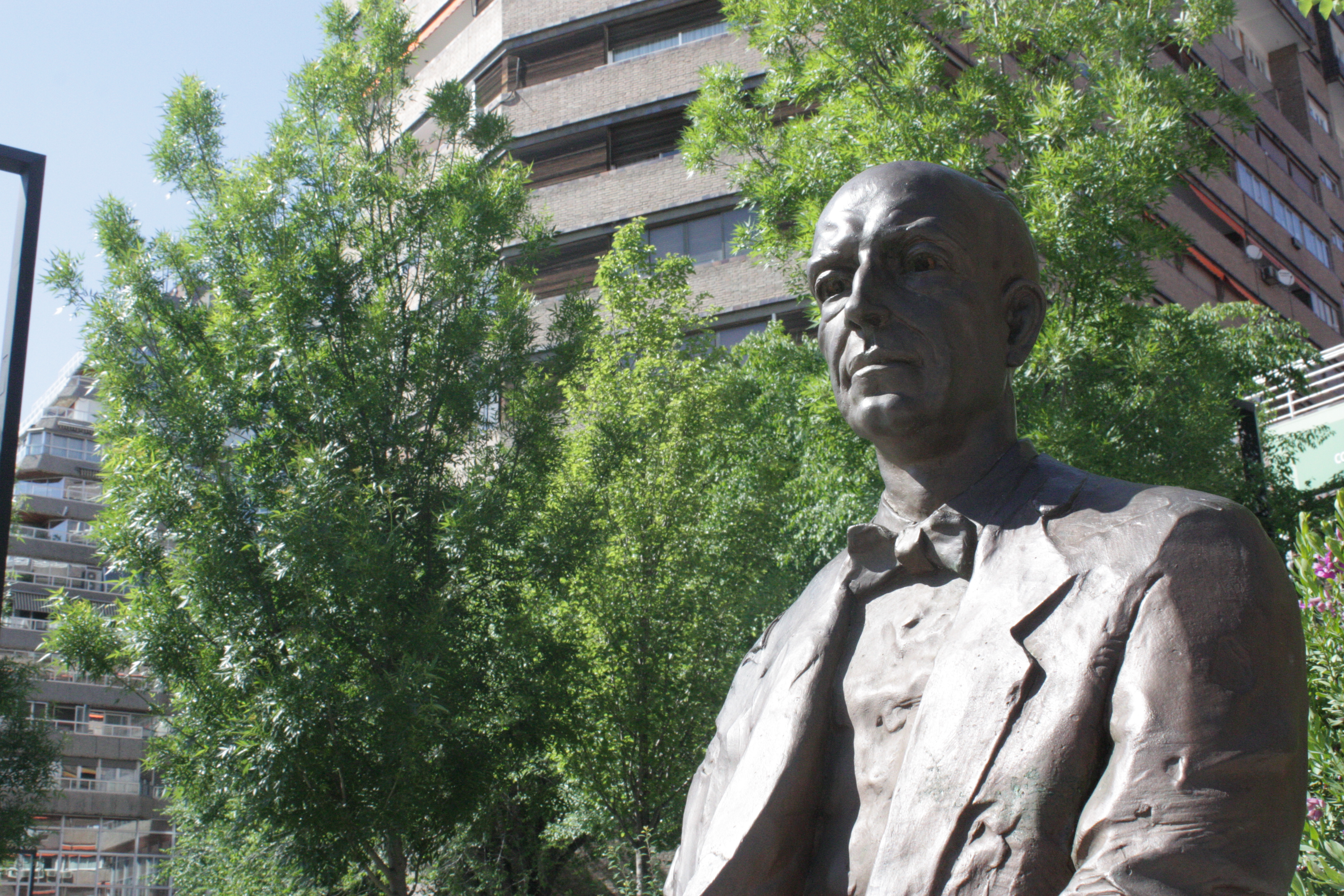
Manuel de Falla, statue in Granada.

El Concurso del Cante Jondo (Contest of the Deep Song) was a fiesta of flamenco arts, music, song, and dance, held in Granada in 1922. Conceived and initiated by composer Manuel de Falla, it enjoyed early and strong support from the poet Federico García Lorca. The two-day evening event was held outdoors at the Alhambra. The show included the best of well-known flamenco artists, but the contest's prize money was reserved for amateur performers.

== Producing the artistic event ==
=== Falla's purpose ===
The Spanish classical composer Manuel de Falla (1876–1946) was the principal organizer of the Concurso. He sought to encourage and enhance the music of cante jondo (literally "deep song", referring to a key element of flamenco, as opposed to "cante chico", the "lighter" more accessible element), which he sensed had fallen into a period of decadence. Falla simply recognized in flamenco an art form of great beauty and drive. The composer had devoted years developing his intuitive ability to craft its stream of color, to etch it shimmering contours in classical scores. He had heard its refrains since his gaditano childhood, from friends of the family, Gitano cantaores and tocaores.

The aim of the Concurso was not merely to celebrate the music, but to nourish and elevate it. Enlisting the support of Spanish intellectuals was considered crucial, to counter the then-current flood of antiflamenquismo raised by the generación del '98. These Spanish reformers were activists in the sweeping effort to modernize and transform Spain and its culture, yet in the process they judged flamenco harshly as frivolous and regressive.For the Concurso to succeed, Falla aimed not only to produce a stellar musical event but also to attract an influential audience as witness. This included members of the flamenco artistic circlesn its musicians and aficionadosbut, above all, the 'luminaries': leading figures from the wider worlds of art and culture who could subsequently sing the praises of cante jondo afterward.

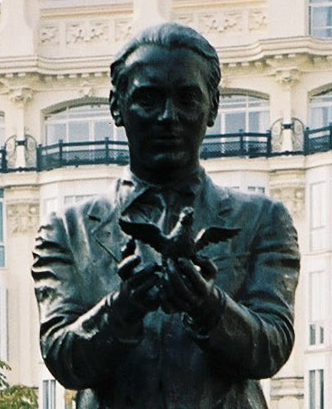
Statue of Lorca in the Plaza de Santa Ana, Madrid

Falla first gathered together an impressive group of musicians and artists to help sponsor and promote the Concurso. Among them, Federico García Lorca. At twenty-three, the granadino poet became a Concurso activist second only to Falla. Lorca publicized, popularized the event by staging his oral presentations descriptive of Flamenco arts; he also published essays on its dramatic style and little-known history. A third important figure was the Basque painter Ignácio Zuloaga.

Among the broad array of music figures enlisted were classical composers Joaquín Turina, Federico Mompou, Conrado del Campo, and Óscar Esplá, pianist and composer María Rodrigo, New York composer and conductor Kurt Schindler, various orchestra directors, classical guitarist Andrés Segovia, Polish singer es:Aga Lahowska, and popular guitarist Manuel Jofré. A local association, the es:Centro Artístico, agreed in the early stages to assist the Concurso.

Andalusian poet Juan Ramón Jiménez (1956 Nobel Prize) joined the Concurso. Writers Ramón Pérez de Ayala and es:Tomás Borrás, and surrealist painter es:Manuel Ángeles Ortiz, contributed. Added support came from two influential professors: philosopher Francisco Giner de los Ríos and Catalan musicologist and composer Felipe Pedrell (Falla's early music teacher). Later came the French hispaniste fr:Maurice Legendre, and musicologist es:Adolfo Salazar critic at Madrid's El Sol, along with producers, and publicists, and nods from Maurice Ravel and Igor Stravinsky.

=== Flamenco and Falla ===
In previous classical compositions Falla often had been inspired by the artistry of flamenco, e.g., in his La vida breve (1904–1905, 1913), Noches en los Jardines de España (1909–1916), El Sombrero de Tres Picos (1917, 1919), and El Amor Brujo (1915, 1925). To promote the Concurso Falla wrote an essay, El "cante jondo" (canto primitivo andaluz), in which he held on technical grounds that the primary foreign influences contributing to the origins of Flamenco music and dance in Spain were three: Byzantine church music coming from the eastern Mediterranean; Moorish music from North Africa and Arabia; and especially the folk music of India, its distinctive rhythms and tone, brought by Gitanos who began arriving in Spain five hundred years ago. These separate traditions acculturated and blended with native Spanish music to yield el cante jondo.

For a century European classical composers had been drawing on the rich heritage of the music of Spain, with flamenco being a favored source. Included would be Glinka, Bizet, Rimsky-Korsakov, Debussy, Ravel, and Stravinsky. The interest and acclaim given flamenco by the international music world contrasted unfavorably with what Falla then saw as the art's current debased state, and with a lack of respect shown flamenco by Spain's cultural elite. A recent book on Manuel de Falla portrays his intent concerning the Concurso:

The cante jondo contest grew out of the conviction--shared by Falla, Lorca, and a host of Spanish intellectuals--that flamenco was being overtaken by urban popular song. The organizers' stated desire to hear the 'admirable sobriety' of classical cantaores shows the extent to which the contest was, in effect, a classicizing gesture... ."

So it was that Falla hoped that the Concurso y Fiesta del Cante Jondo, sponsored by its many musicians and cultural figures, and by the Centro Artístico of Granada, would "restore all the purity to these marvelous songs, that rightly constitute one of the best natural achievements of European music". Yet this "rescue-fantasy" view has been further challenged by another recent critic as advancing a fiction: the false notion of a "purity" in flamenco origins.

=== Public funding ===
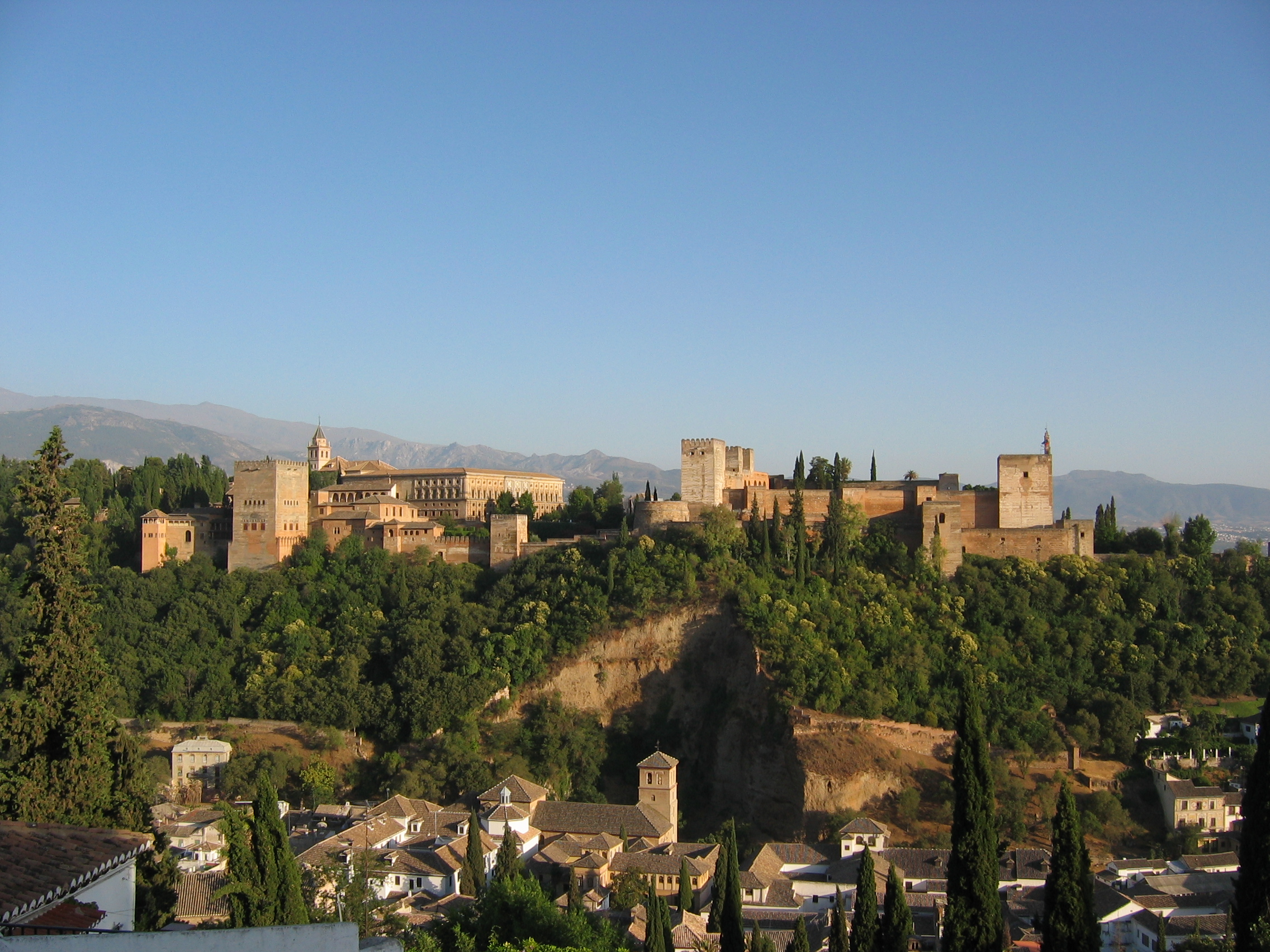
The Alhambra, as seen from Mirador de San Nicolás, in Granada.

Financial support was obtained for the Concurso de Cante Jondo from the City of Granada, but not without spirited opposition. Adherents praised the antiquity and purity of the flamenco art form, whose mysterious source lay in the very fountainhead of the human soul. Their critics pointed out the sometimes lesser quality of the music and the mixed milieu of flamenco performances, which at propriety's edge could include some notorious venues.

The Concurso supporters, who saw themselves as saviors of the true and venerable art of flamenco, evidently felt somewhat vulnerable to their opponent's challenge. Already, to escape the reproach regarding flamenco's unwanted baggage, the Concurso referred to the art form as Cante Jondo rather than by its more common name flamenco. Here the Concurso followed the lead of Falla the aficionado, whose opinion was: "Queremos purificar y hacer revivir ese admirable cante jondo, que no hay que confundir con el cante flamenco, degeneración y casi caricatura de aquél."

The war of words over municipal financing was inconclusive; the funding continued. In the event, the funding seemed to meet expectations.

Debate over the nature of flamenco in its many guises continues, at times in a cauldron boiling with such politically-charged ingredients as social class, and ethnic origins. Yet more commonly-contested are each performer's individual sound, drama, authenticity, inspiration. A developed art form with a history, flamenco often provokes different, opposing, conflicting views. Protagonists might identify with a local neighborhood, or loyally follow a particular star. Professors, flamencologos, sourced in musicology or ethnomusicology contributed. Although often rife with music-culture controversy, as frequently such disputes are all together explicitly ignored.

Expectations of a larger turn-out grew as the date neared. The venue was changed from the plaza de San Nicolás del Albayzín to the more spacious Alhambra.

== Events of the Concurso ==
=== Flamenco artists ===
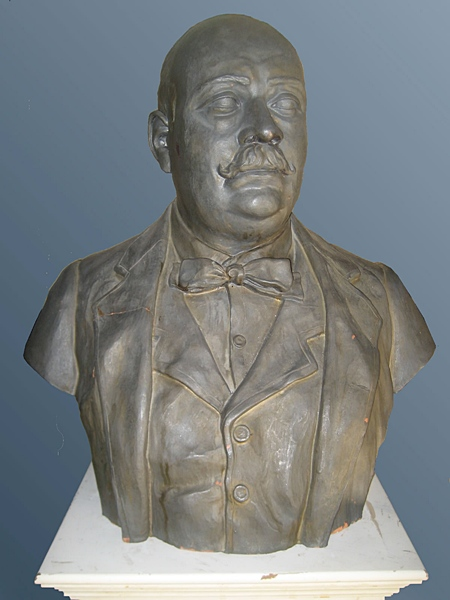
Bust of Antonio Chacón.

An announced aim of the Concurso was to discover unknown, unrecognized talent thought to be hidden, perhaps in remote rural areas. As a result, no professional over the age of 21 was allowed to compete for prize money in the Concurso contest. Yet the performance of flamenco is considered to be very demanding.

The elimination of all professionals from the contest was considered a mistake by many in flamenco, because there remained established practitioners of 'flamenco puro' who, while not fallen prey to the era's commercialism, might lack recompense. The Concurso, however, apart from the contest, did directly encourage the song and dance of professionals. The composition of the 'Jury' for the Concurso included four famous flamenco performers: Antonio Chacón, Pastora Pavón (La Niña de los Peines), Manuel Torre, and Juana la Macarrona. Another jurist was the well-known Spanish classical guitarist Andrés Segovia.

Although the Concurso made diligent efforts to find the flamenco 'diamond in the rough', few unknowns were discovered. The poet García Lorca did meet a blind and aged woman who could sing a type of cante (the liviana) thought to be extinct.

=== Favored styles ===
Contestants were invited to perform certain palos [styles] of flamenco song, those referred to as Cante Jondo (or Cante Grande), grouped as follows: 1) Siguiriyas gitana; 2) Serranas, Polos, Cañas, Soleares; and, 3) Martinetes-Carceleras, Tonás, Livianas, Saetas Viejas (these last four being unaccompanied cantes a palo seco). On the other hand, flamenco styles explicitly forbidden (e.g., for a perceived lack of antiquity or profound expression) included: Malagueña, Granaínas, Rondeña, Sevillanas, Peteneras.

=== The audience ===
The event ran the two evenings of the Corpus Christi holiday. It was attended by about four thousand supporters and aficionados. The large gathering was described as both elegant and jubilant. Its stir and buzz would subside when the performers began. Then the audience might seem to collectively come together, attentive, expectant, focused. A storm threatened the first night, but the air remained light. The second night a rain began to fall, yet the audience remained.

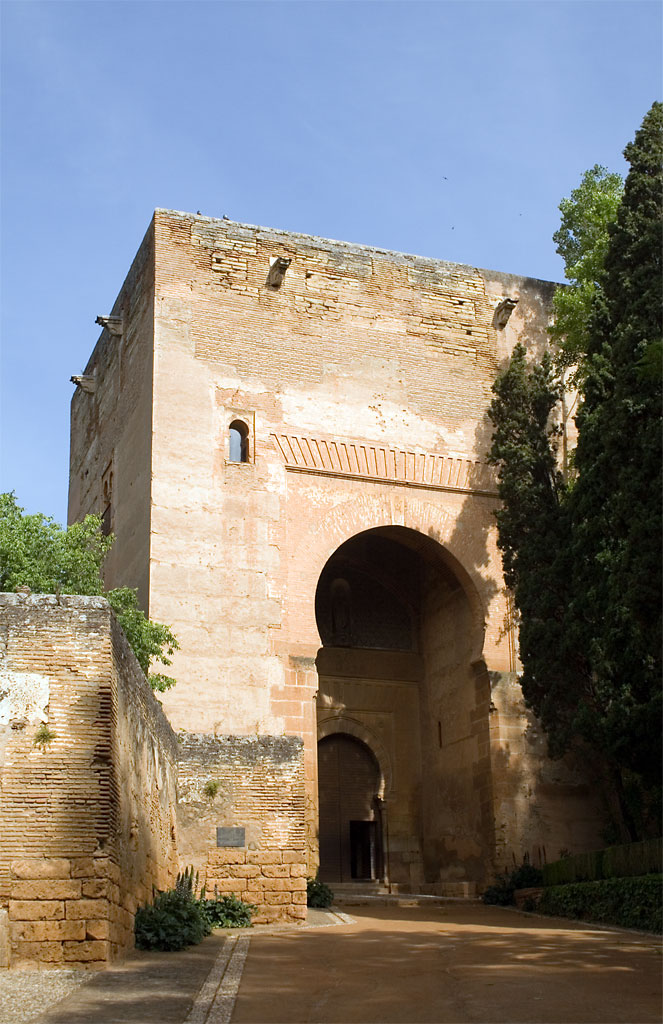
Torre de la Justicia, original entry gate to the Alhambra; and in 1922, the walk way to a June evening's Concurso events.

=== 'Alhambra' venue ===
The Concurso was held on the grounds of the Alhambra, at the Plaza de Aljibes on the palace's west end, overlooking the Torre Bermeja and the old city of Granada to the southwest; to the north lay the rising slopes of the Sacromonte (the Gypsi quarter). Perfumed by cypress trees, and with French lavender scattered on the ground for the event, the plaza lay across the crest of a ridge, to which one ascended, entering by way of the Torre de la Justicia. It was decorated for the occasion by the artist Ignacio Zuloaga, whose visual display employed brilliant embroidered textiles and mantones [capes] of Andalucia. After sundown the plaza setting would become a colorful region of lights beside the Arab palace.

Granada had been acclaimed as a fitting place for the cultural event. "La Granada de 1922 era el símbulo de la Andalucía renaciente y fecunda. Un núcleo de artistas, un grupo de professores jóvenes, unas tertulias literarias... ." The initial performance perhaps seemed ironic to some: Falla's classical composition Homenaje a Debussy para la guitarra, played by Segovia. Yet Debussy had led Falla to rediscover his flamenco inspiration.

=== The contestants ===
A retired flamenco cantaor of seventy-two years, Diego Bermúdez Cala (El Tenazas), became an engaging contestant of the Concurso. He had walked the hundred or so kilometers to Granada from his home in Puente Genil. Thirty years before a punctured lung suffered at knife point, had forced him to retire from the flamenco circuit. The Concurso provided him the opportunity to performe old palos that seemed to summon the duende of an earlier era. To many, Tío Bermúdez appeared as if he'd learned his cante directly from Silverio Franconetti; although for others he didn't know how to sing, only flirt.

"El Tenazas knew the old time cantes and was extremely flamenco and true in his interpretations." He sang with a purity not heard in decades, especially his siguiriyas, soleares, and cañas (a Franconetti favorite). Listening to el Tío Tenazas ["Uncle Tongs"] "hurl into the air his song", Antonio Chacón exclaimed, "¡Válgame Dios, lo que oigo!" ["Lord help me, what I hear!"]. Falla later carried a copy of his recordings (Cantos de Diego Bermúdez) with him into exile in Argentina. El Tenazas enjoyed his renown and celebrity. On its strength he soon made a flamenco tour of Spain; yet the following year would be his last.

The other first place prize winner for song was a twelve-year-old cantaor named Manolo Ortega, called later El Caracol. The youth came from a well-known Gitano family (bullfighting and flamenco). El Caracol would win great renown, but his edgy personality attracted controversy. Despite a reputation for a flamenco puro style, in his prime starting in the 1930s, he greatly prospered by commercially mixing his cante jondo with popular trends and tastes.

Another winner was the cantaor of Granada, Francisco Gálvez Gómez (Yerbagüena), a friend of bull-fighters and politicians. In an inspired moment he created a lasting impression as he improvised flamenco lyrics in response to news of a local church fire. He received a prize.

es:María Amaya, a relative of then four-year-old Carmen Amaya, won a prize as cantaora. While at the Concurso she acquired her stage name La Gazpacha (the cold soup of Spain). Two guitarists split the prize for tocaor: es:Manolo de Huelva and José Cuellar. Altogether there were ten amateur contestants who won prize money of varying amounts, which the public funding and ticket sales evidently covered.

=== The professionals ===
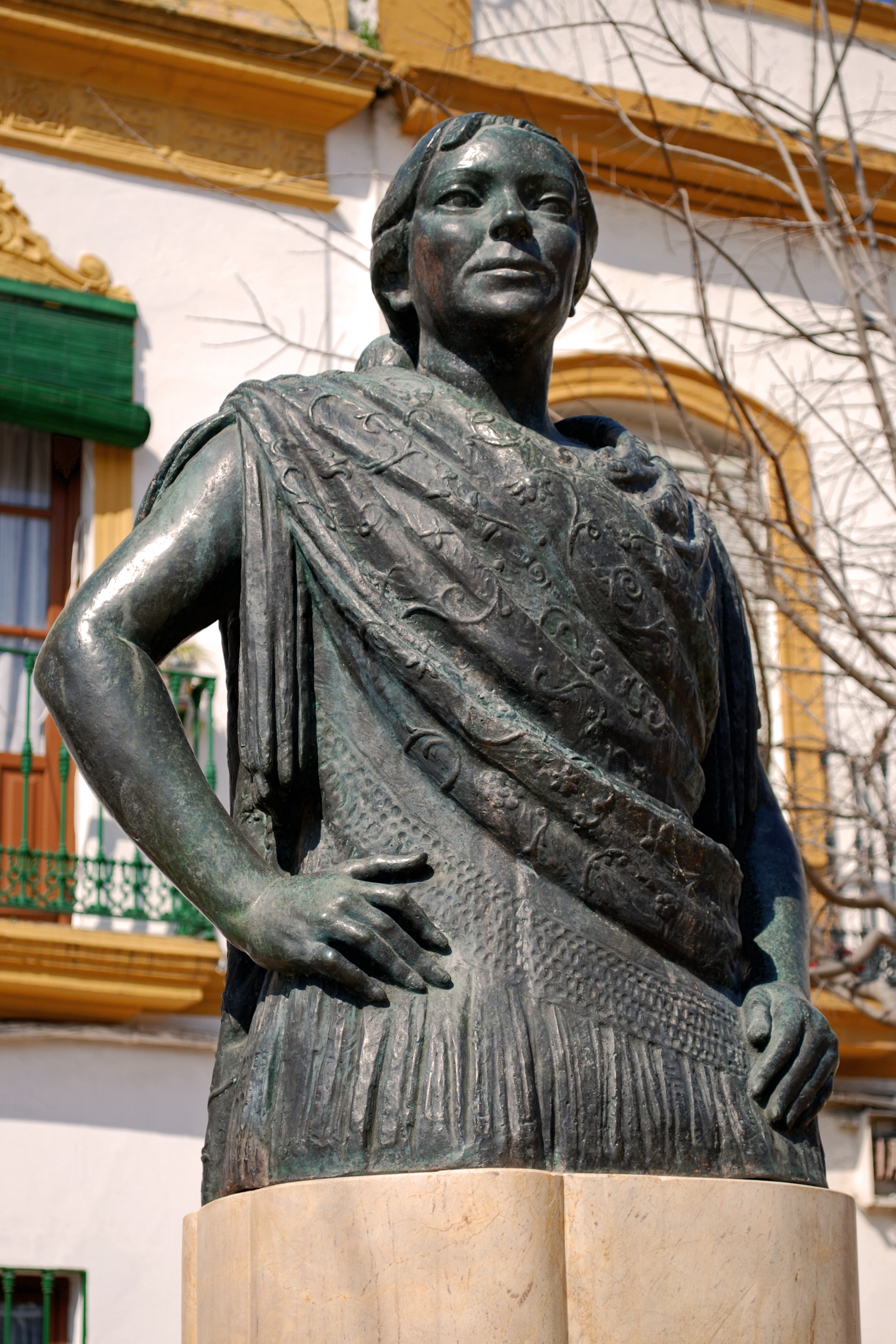
Statue of Pastora Pavón, at Alameda de Hércules, Sevilla.

Despite not being eligible for prizes, active flamenco professionals were honored at the Concurso. Among those acclaimed and invited as guests of honor and as judges [jurados]: the cantaora Pastora Pavón (La Niña de los Peines), the cantaor Manuel Torre, and the bailaora Juana la Macarrona. Esteemed was the cantaor Antonio Chacón, chosen as the presiding judge. These four were then each known as estrellas of the flamenco world. The tocaor Amalio Cuenca was also chosen as a judge, who was an impresario who managed a flamenco cafe in Paris. Professionals came to the event from all regions of Spain and from abroad.

During the Concurso fiesta some events of duende were remembered. Manuel Torre sang alegrías to palmas by local Gypsy women of the Sacromonte. To Pepe Cuéllar's guitar, es:María Amaya La Gazpacha sang bulerías and tarantas. Hired by the Concurso were three guitarists who for the occasion became a trio: José Cuéllar, Ramón Montoya, and the extraordinary es:Manolo de Huelva. To their tocaores danced the elder maestra Juana la Macarrona, including por alegrías. Antonia Mercé la Argentina, after watching la Macarrona dance during the Concurso, later knelt down at her feet, took off her shoes, and carried them away!

La Macarrona, at various moments during the Concurso, would famously cry out, "¡Lapoteosis! ¡Es lapoteosis!", her expression somewhat like crying "thunder strike!" At an early Concurso performance, while Antonio Chacón was singing accompanied by Ramón Montoya on guitar, a poorly dressed, elderly Gypsy woman who had been seen quietly weeping, rose to her feet, drew her head back, and began to dance the soleares with remarkable style and grace. She turned out to be La Golondrina, many decades earlier a famous bailaora.

== News of the event ==
The Spanish press generally spoke in praise of the Concurso, in contrast to the depressing news of the Moroccan war then current. A Madrid magazine published soon after the event described the Concurso as "unforgettable", with its alternating displays of yearning, vehemence, superstition, or fervor, "a simple seduction of sound, rhythms linear in the flesh". About the audience it said:

"The moon didn't attend, but the place was swarming with gnomes, elves, and even diablos. A huge box-office hit. Not an empty seat. And it was a disciplined, cultured audience dominated by women, many of whom were wearing 1830 dresses, and others were in old trousers, and all of them with that poise which is the privilege of women from Granada. With fans, the crowd rumored and fluttered, unless suddenly a copla paralyzed them with its emotion... ."

La Alhambra of Granada hailed the Concurso as "unas cuantas noches de brillantísima fiesta." In Madrid, press comments included the declaration: "Muy grande ha sido el éxito del Concurso." Nonetheless Manuel de Falla became dissatisfied.

== Aftermath ==
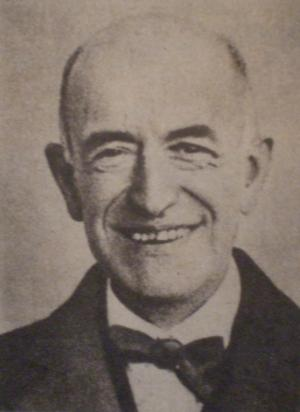
Manuel de Falla (1876-1946)

The event's performances were well received. Although it could be argued that the general results of the Concurso were somewhat mixed, success could well be claimed for the event itself, an enjoyable and seminal gathering of performers and aficionados. In addition, there followed a steady rise in status of flamenco among the cultural and intellectual leaders of Spain. Recordings were made of the various cantes, some little known, some rediscovered. For example, La Caña:

"[A]n ancient cante with religious overtones and chant-like passages that have made it a popular vehicle for the misa flamenca--the catholic mass performed to flamenco music. La Caña had all but disappeared by the twentieth century, but was partially revived after the Granada contest of 1922, when it was recorded by the contest winner, El Tenazas."

On the other hand, the stated aim of elevating the root purity of flamenco performance was not to be achieved as a result of the Concurso. A new era in the art's development was dawning, the period of Ópera flamenca, now often disparaged for its theatrical airs, its brand of syncretism and merger with other musical styles. Hence, with such developments Manuel de Falla, who much admired the pure 'deep song' of flamenco, was not satisfied.

Yet similar flamenco gatherings followed, as that same year both Sevilla and Cádiz celebrated Flamenco Concursos. Several decades later in 1956, the city of Córdoba celebrated the first Concurso Nacional de Cante Jondo. Its "manifesto de convocatoria" expressed reasons and motives similar if not the same as those articulated by the 1922 Concurso in Granada. In 1962 Jerez de la Frontera held its Concurso Internacional de Arte Flamenco. Such events have become a regular feature of flamenco culture.

== See also ==
- Flamenco
- Manuel de Falla
- Federico García Lorca
- Diego Bermúdez - El Tenazas (cantaor)
- Antonio Chacón - Emperador del cante jondo (cantaor)
- Ramón Montoya - (tocaor)
- Manolo Ortega - El Caracol (cantaor)
- Pastora Pavón - La Niña de los Peines (cantaora)
- Manuel Torre - Niño de Jerez (cantaor)
- Juana Vargas - Juana la Macarrona (bailaora)
- Andrés Segovia - (tocaor)
