= Manolo Caracol =

Spanish flamenco singer

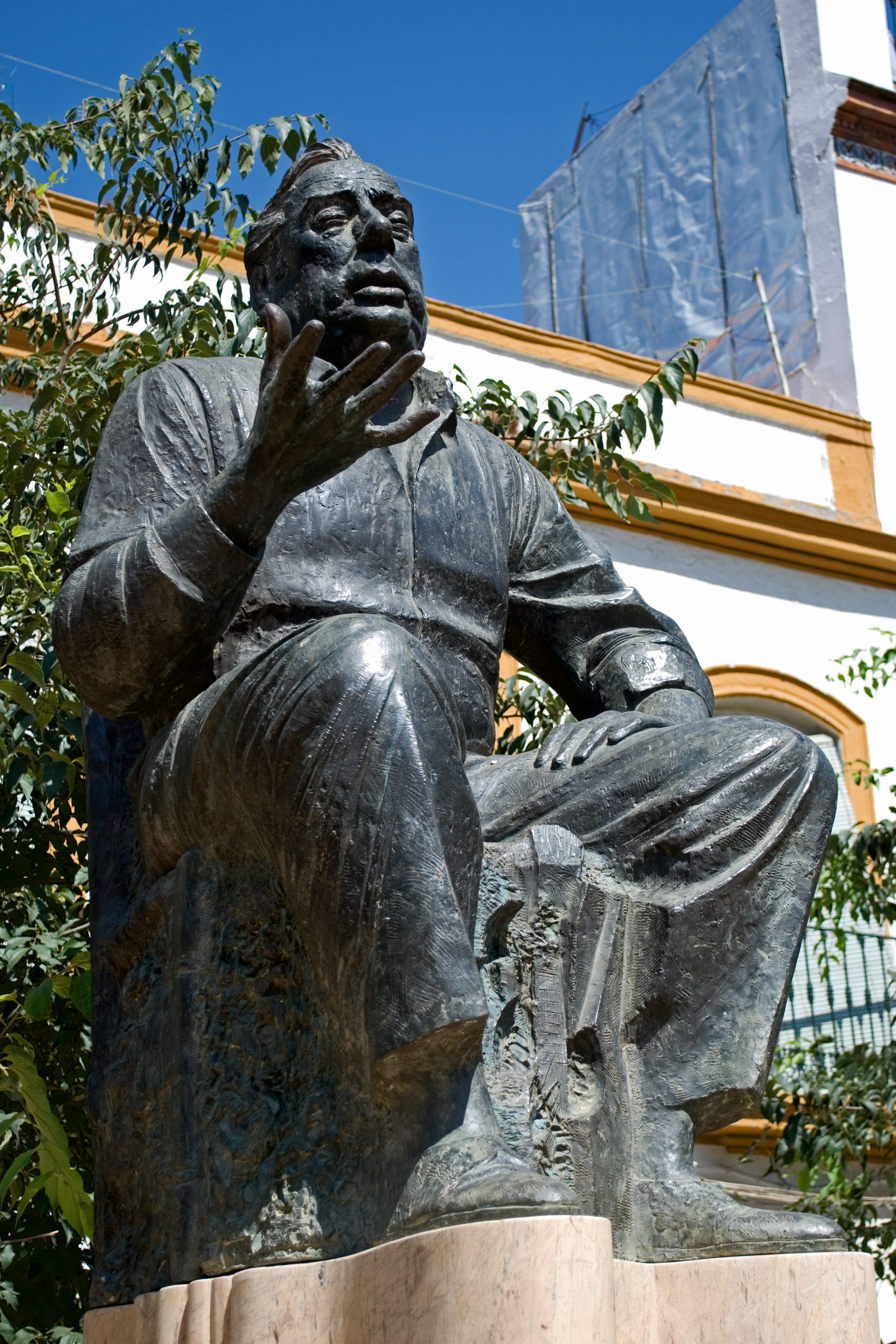
- Bronze statue of Juárez at the Alameda de Hércules, Seville, Spain
- Born: Manuel Ortega Juárez; 9 July 1909; Seville, Spain
- Died: 24 February 1973 (aged 63); Madrid, Spain
- Other name: El Caracol
- Occupation: Flamenco singer (cantaor)
- Years active: 1922–1973
- Known for: Flamenco singing, founding Los Canasteros tablao

Manuel Ortega Juárez performed under the stage name Manolo Caracol (9 July 1909 – 24 February 1973) was a Spanish flamenco cantaor (singer).

== Life and family ==
Born in Seville, Spain, he was descended from a long line of flamenco artists including Enrique Ortega (father and son) and Curro Dulce, and he was possibly related to El Planeta and El Fillo. The family was also known for its bull fighters.

Under the stage name El Caracol, he "gained international fame as much for his flamboyant personality as for his extraordinary cante." Later his juergas (days long flamenco parties) became notorious. Although as a singer he always retained the ability to deliver the core of the traditional art, he was not ashamed to commercialize flamenco to attract a mass popularity; then he gained fame and fortune, as well as adding to a checkered reputation. For the most part, this was during what was later widely known as a decadent age in the history of the art, the age of Ópera flamenca.

In 1922 as a youth, he had been awarded the first prize (shared with El Tenazas) at the Concurso de Cante Jondo de Granada, organized by intellectuals like Manuel de Falla and Federico García Lorca. However, in the first stage of his career, he made a living singing mostly at private parties, which at the time, were, together with cafés, the usual stages for flamenco artists.

During the Spanish Civil War (1936–1939), he started touring with theatre companies as, owing to the war, private parties were difficult to find. This kind of theatre show, very common at the time, was a musical with commonplace love stories set in Andalusian or gypsy context and their musical pieces were usually a mixture of Spanish popular songs called Coplas andaluzas or Canciones españolas. In 1943, he met Lola Flores, with whom he started an intense professional and emotional relationship. They became the most popular artistic couple in Spain during the forties, spreading their fame even to several Spanish American countries. His most popular songs in the field of copla andaluza, which he used to call zambra, date from that time: songs like La salvaora and La niña de fuego became immensely famous in Spain. He also took part in several films such as Un caballero famoso (1942), Embrujo (1946), Jack el Negro (1950) and La niña de la venta (1950).

In 1963 he opened the tablao Los Canasteros, where he dedicated the rest of his life, and where the most outstanding artists of the time performed. During this period he also performed with some of his children in theatres and festivals. Los Canasteros was opened with Perla de Cádiz, Fernando Terremoto and María Vargas on vocals, Trini España on dance and Melchor de Marchena and Paco Cepero on guitar. Many artists: men and women, singers, guitarists, palmeros and dancers worked in the tablao.

Although sometimes criticized by a very orthodox section of the flamenco public (mainly because of his facet as a singer of copla andaluza, a style which purists consider spurious, but also because of the irregularity of his performances), he is usually considered as one of the singers that better represent 'Duende' (a typical flamenco term which basically means "inspiration"). He possessed a deep, earthy, yet warm voice, and delivered the flamenco cantes (songs) with passion, originality, and extremely personal phrasing. He excelled in a wide variety of flamenco styles, including Martinetes, Seguiriyas, Soleá, Malagueñas (especially in the style of el Mellizo), Bulerías and Fandangos, among others. His renderings of Fandangos, in particular, were so personal that they have come to be known as Fandangos Caracoleros.

Caracol died in a road accident in Madrid, Spain.

== Critics' reviews ==
Álvarez Caballero: "It's true that Manolo Caracol could sink to the lowest levels, real slumps in which his singing was just a parody of itself, but this often happens to cantaores of his type, who are motivated by emotional impulse, and the knowing flamenco fan knows that this can happen. From a regular singer like Mairena we can expect he will always sing well; From somebody like Caracol (...) you could expect anything: either he was a disaster or he was an absolute genius. (Ángel Álvarez Caballero, El cante flamenco, 1998)

Anselmo González Climent: "With Caracol, it is impossible to remain emotionally detached (...), from the first line, since the "temple" itself he starts running through our sensibility and invades us thoroughly. He forces us to take part until our egos are suppressed." (quoted by Álvarez Caballero in La discografía ideal del flamenco, 1995)

Ricardo Molina about Caracol's anthology Una historia del cante flamenco: "From the caña to the group of Malagueñas (flamenco style), this anthology is an evil personification of Caracol messing up the definite forms of the past." (quoted by Álvarez Caballero in La discografía ideal del flamenco, 1995)

== Recordings ==
As happens with most flamenco artists of the past, Caracol's discography is in complete disorder. His recordings are regularly republished, but in different compilations, sometimes in careless remasterizations, by different record companies.

Una historia del cante flamenco, originally published by Hispavox in 1958 with guitarist Melchor de Marchena remains his most seminal work. It was republished, together with other recordings, in the compilation El genio: Manolo Caracol in the Quejío CD collection published by Hispavox and compiled by J.M. Gamboa . This recording excludes his zambras. For other recordings available, see links below.

== Selected filmography ==
- A Famous Gentleman (1943)
- The Girl at the Inn (1951)
