= Diego Bermúdez =

Diego Bermúdez may refer to:

- Diego Bermúdez (singer) (1850–1923), Spanish flamenco singer
- Diego Bermúdez (footballer) (born 1982), Spanish footballer
