= Rafael de Utrera =

Spanish flamenco singer (born 1973)

- Born: Rafael Usero; 14 July 1973 (age 53); Utrera, Spain
- Genres: Flamenco, Jazz, Blues
- Occupation: singer
- Years active: 1990–present
- Website: www.rafaeldeutrera.com (in Spanish)

Rafael Usero (born 14 July 1973) is a Spanish flamenco singer more commonly known of his stage name Rafael de Utrera.

== Biography ==
=== Early life and career ===
Born in Utrera, Rafael de Utrera began singing flamenco at a young age with the influence of his father, who owned a flamenco club in their hometown of Utrera. At the age of ten, Rafael had already performed around Andalucia with his brother. Rafael became more well known in the world of flamenco in the year 1997 when famous Spanish flamenco dancer Cristina Hoyos invited him to join her cast on her world tour. In 2000, Rafael's abilities as a singer gained more recognition when he was a finalist in the singing competition the XI Bienal de Flamenco de Sevilla. Briefly after, in 2001, Rafael de Utrera made his final breakthrough when Paco de Lucía himself asked Rafael to accompany his world tour in Europe, Japan, and America.

Since then, Rafael has been touring frequently around Europe and North America. He has collaborated on albums with artists such as José Mercé, José Antonio Rodríguez, Niño de Pura, the documentary of the life of Paco de Lucia, Vicente Amigo's latest album with Alejandro Sanz, Enrique Morente, and Niña Pastori. The most recent collaboration was with the Netherlands Metropole Orchestra under the direction of Vince Mendoza where he recorded a live album called "Proyecto Lorca".

At the moment, Rafael is performing with the guitarist Vicente Amigo and his cast including his wife, flamenco dancer Carmen Lozano.

== Discography ==
Year	Title	Label
2012	TBA	Studiotrece

=== Collaborated acts ===
Year	Title	Artist	Label
2002	Pozo y Caudal	Niño de Pura	Senador
2007	Córdoba... En el tiempo.	José Antonio Rodríguez	Universal
2008	A Contratiempo	Paco Escobar	Autoproducción
2009	Paseo De Gracia	Vicente Amigo	Sony BMG
2009	EL VIENTO – THE GARCÍA LORCA PROJECT	Vince Mendoza & The Metropole Orchestra	ACT Music

=== DVD ===
Year	Title	Artist
2008	Córdoba en el tiempo. en vivo.	José Antonio Rodríguez
