= Cante jondo =

Musical form and style of flamenco

Cante jondo (Spanish: [ˈkante ˈxondo]) is a vocal style in flamenco, an unspoiled form of Andalusian folk music. The name means "deep song" in Spanish, with hondo ("deep") spelled with J (Spanish pronunciation: [x]) as a form of eye dialect, because traditional Andalusian pronunciation has retained an aspirated H lost in other forms of Spanish.

The common traditional classification of flamenco music divides it into three groups, of which the deepest, most serious forms are known as cante jondo.

Cante jondo is linked closely to the suffering and marginalization experienced by Romani people.

== Cultural references to cante jondo ==
In 1922 the Spanish composer Manuel de Falla led in the organization of the Concurso de Cante Jondo for Granada. Many classical musicians, cultural and literary figures, including the young poet Federico García Lorca, participated in the program. The result was the memorable series of flamenco performances held at the Alhambra during June.

Lorca had evidently used the title Poema del cante jondo for a 1921 collection of poems, although he did not publish it for ten years.

In 1931, García Lorca presented a conference devoted to keeping the rich tradition of the cante jondo alive. The following is translated from the conference notes by Lorca:

The cante jondo approaches the rhythm of the birds and the natural music of the black poplar and the waves; it is simple in oldness and style. It is also a rare example of primitive song, the oldest of all Europe, where the ruins of history, the lyrical fragment eaten by the sand, appear live like the first morning of its life. The illustrious Falla, who studied the question attentively, affirms that the gypsy siguiriya is the song type of the group cante jondo and declares that it is the only song on our continent that has been conserved in its pure form, because of its composition and its style and the qualities it has in itself, the primitive songs of the oriental people.
