= Café Cantante =

- Directed by: Antonio Momplet
- Written by: Antonio Momplet
- Starring: Imperio Argentina
- Cinematography: Pablo Tabernero
- Production company: Cosmos Film
- Release date: July 5, 1951; (Argentina)
- Running time: 90 minute
- Countries: Argentina; Spain
- Language: Spanish

Café Cantante is a 1951 Argentine-Spanish historical musical film directed and written by Antonio Momplet during the classical era of Argentine cinema. The film was released on July 5, 1951.

== Plot ==
The movie takes place in mid 19th Century Andalusia, Spain. An attractive flamenco dancer and singer, Rosarillo, captivates Andalusian audiences with her talent. On her wedding night, while she performed, her husband is murdered. When she is told the news onstage, she vows to avenge her husband's murder.

== Cast ==
- Imperio Argentina as Rosario, La Petenera
- Ricardo Trigo as José Luis
- Francisco Martínez Allende as Juez
- Andrés Mejuto as Rondeño
- Edmundo Barbero as Don Paco
- Ricardo Castro Ríos as Pacorro
- Blanca Alonso de los Ríos as Gabriela
- Albano Zuñiga as Joselillo
- Emilio Escudero as Reverte

== See also ==
- Tablao
