= Perla de Cádiz =

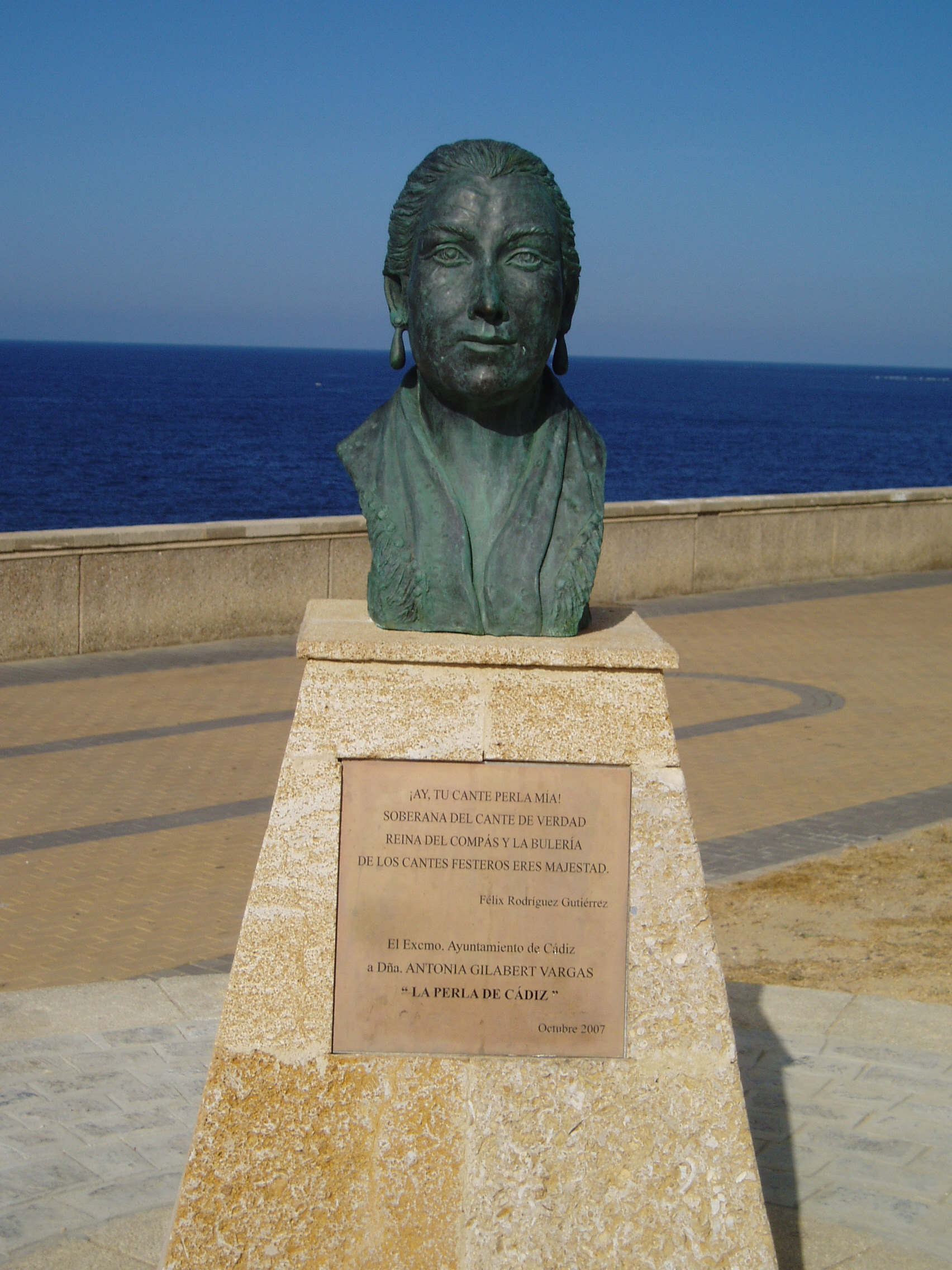
Statue of Perla de Cádiz

La Perla de Cádiz (The Pearl of Cadiz) is the stage name of Antonia Gilabert Vargas (Cádiz, 1924 - Cádiz, 1975), who was a Spanish gypsy (gitana) flamenco singer.

== Biography ==
Of gypsy ethnicity, daughter of flamenco artists, her father was the guitarist Juan Gilabert and her mother the singer Rosa Vargas Fernández, known as Rosa la Papera. She was born in Calle de la Botica, in the Santa María district (Cadiz).

In 1960 she made her debut in the Zambra tablao in Madrid. In 1962 she won First Prize for Bulerías in the Concurso Nacional de Cantes de Jerez. She was later hired by the Seville tablaos of Los Gallos and El Guajiro. However, a year later she returned to Madrid, hired by Manolo Caracol for the opening of his tablao, Los Canasteros. In 1964 she moved to El Duende and later worked in Torres Bermejas and El Corral de la Morería, as well as in Cadiz's La Cueva del Pájaro Azul, and in its venta-tablao 'La Perla de Cai', in Valdelagrana, in El Puerto de Santa María. In 1968 she won the First Prize in the First Cante de Cádiz Competition.

The flexibility and sweetness of her voice prepared with surprising mastery the culmination of the songs and passed without artificial efforts and with naturalness, from the power to the most delicious smoothness.

She died in Cadiz in 1975 at the age of 51. She was married to Curro la Gamba. Her death when she was still quite young came as a consequence of a breast cancer.

She stood out for the styles of: alegrías, bulerías, soleares, tientos, tangos and saetas. She also stood out for her excellent compás and interpretative skills. At present, a flamenco club called La Perla de Cádiz in Cadiz, bears her name. So does a street in Cadiz.

== Discography ==
- La Perla de Cádiz (19 cantes). Includes bulerías, cantiñas, romance por tientos, rumba flamenca, fandangos, romera, alegrías and tangos. Accompanied on guitar by Paco Aguilera, Moraito Chico, Félix de Utrera, Antonio Arenas, Melchor de Marchena, Enrique de Melchor, Eugenio Salas and Paco Cepero.

Tributes in Cadiz

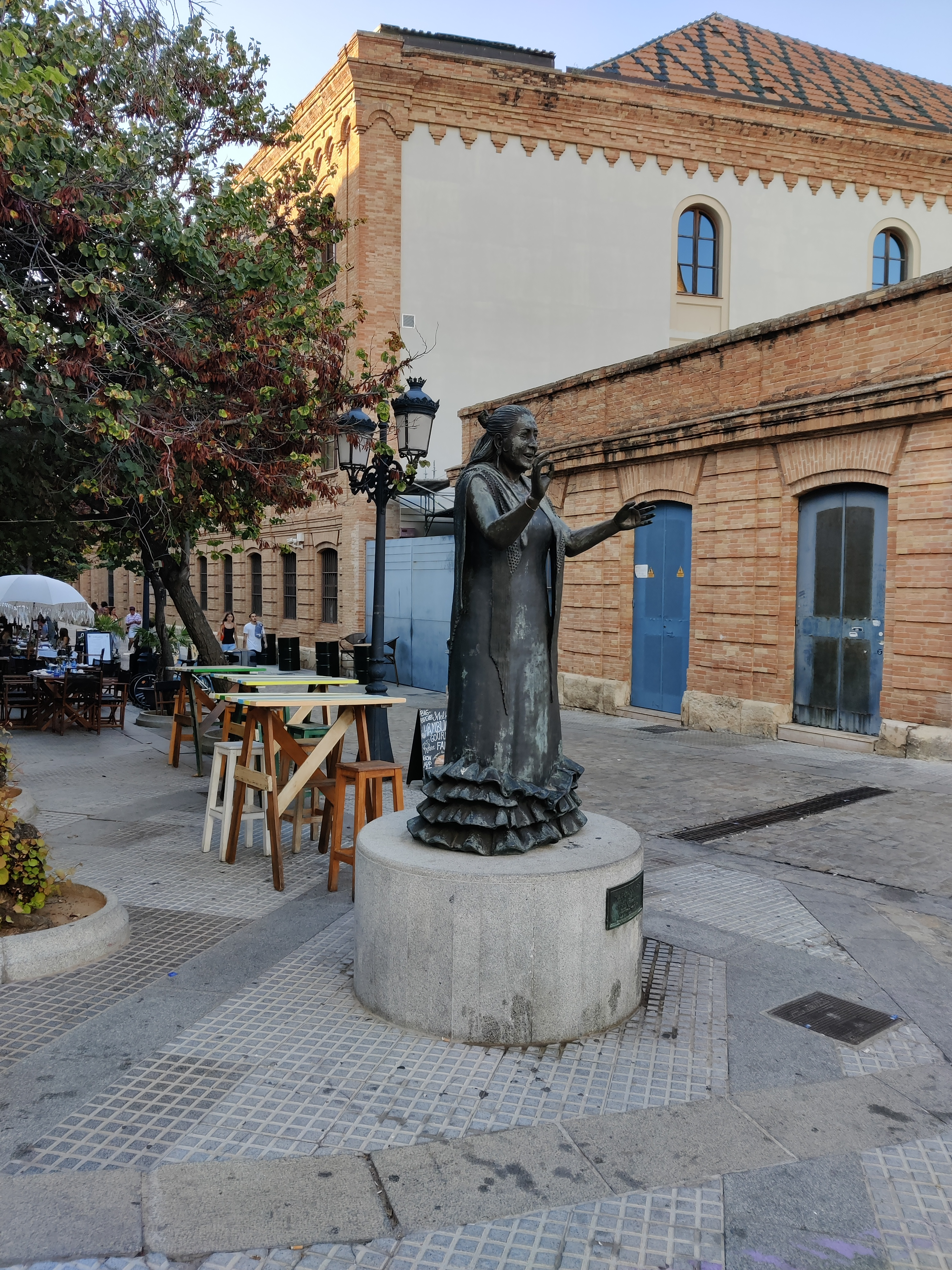
Statue in front of Santo Domingo church

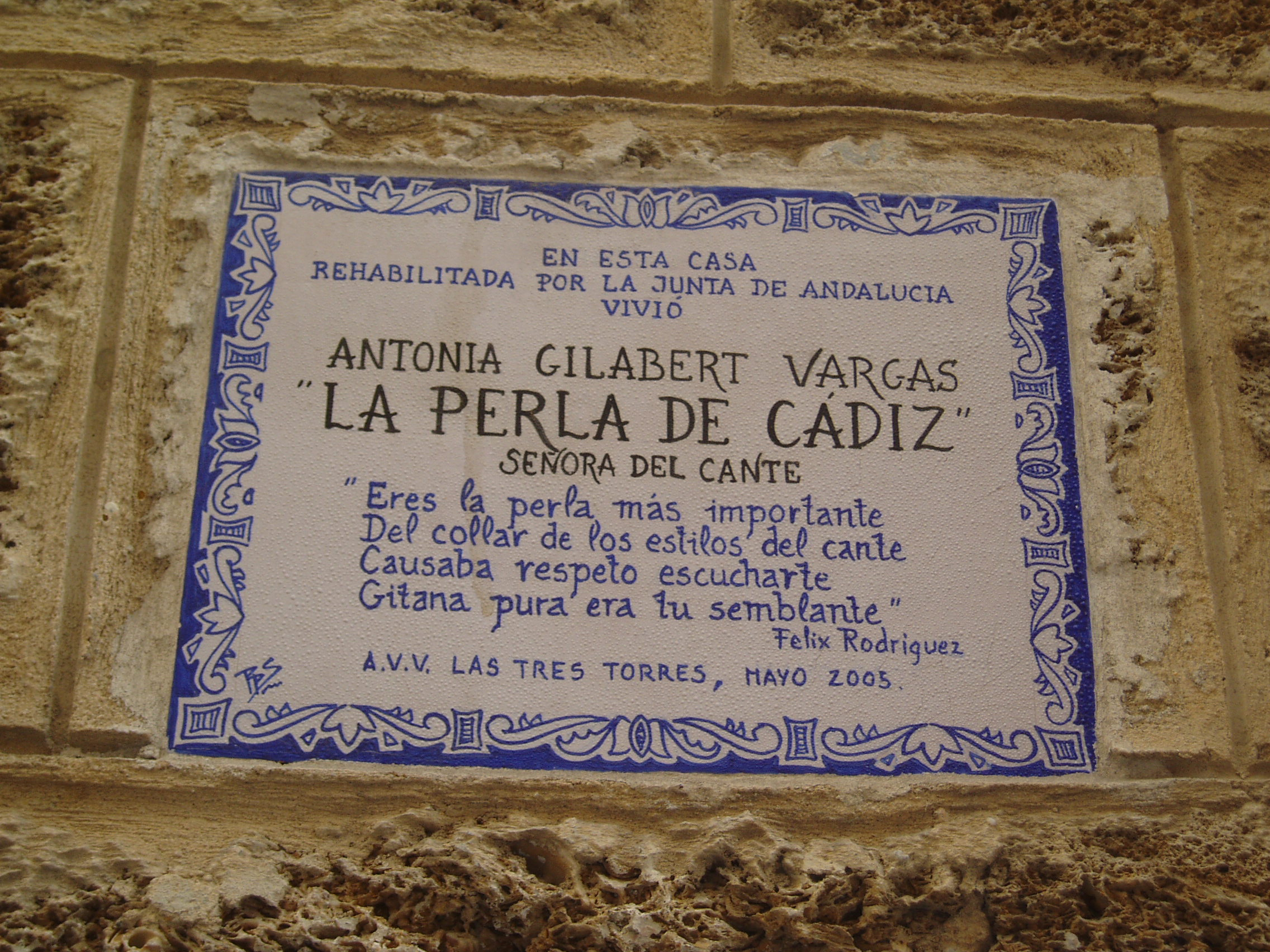
Wall plaque in Calle Botica
