= Bienal de Flamenco =

Spanish festival

- Genre: flamenco
- Locations: Sevilla, Spain
- Years active: 1980 – present
- Website: http://www.labienal.com/en/

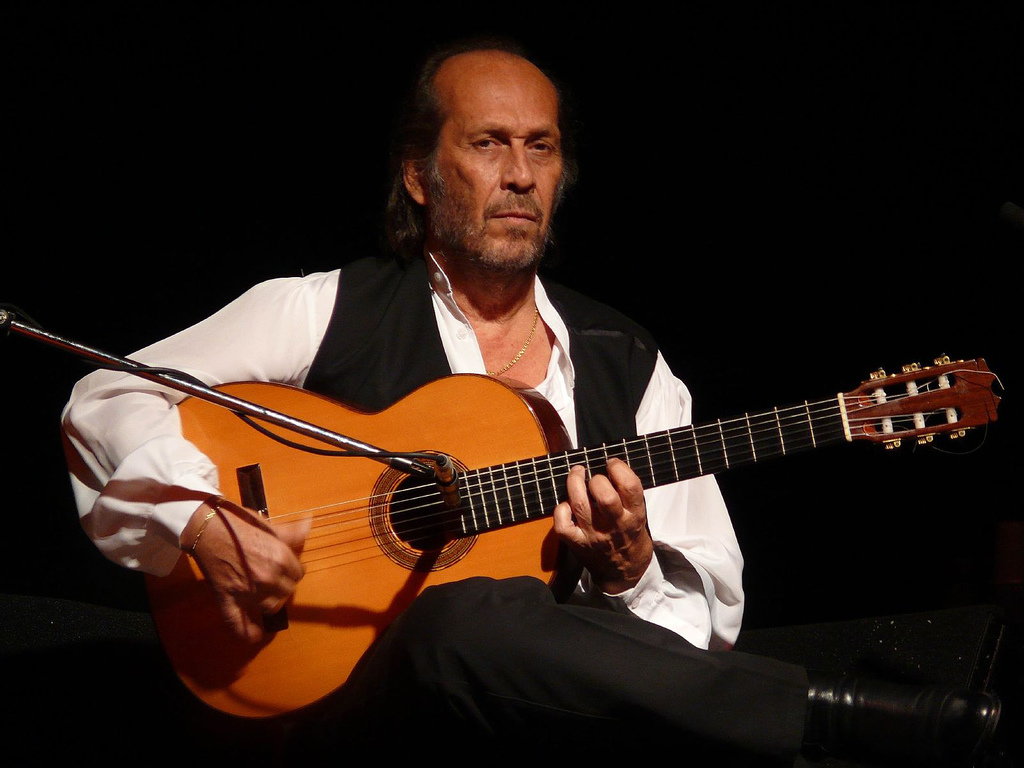
Paco de Lucía, guitarist

The Bienal de Flamenco is an international festival dedicated to flamenco music and dance, held biennially in Seville, Spain. Established in 1980, it is the oldest and most prominent festival of its kind in the country, showcasing both traditional and contemporary flamenco. The festival spans several weeks and features concerts, dance performances, and interdisciplinary productions in venues across the city.

== History ==
The first biennale took place in 1980. According to longtime director Antonio Zoido, the festival was conceived as a democratic gesture to return flamenco to the public sphere after years of state appropriation during the Franco era. At the inaugural edition of the festival, Calixto Sánchez received the Giraldillo, its top award.

Since its inception, the Bienal has grown into one of the most internationally recognized flamenco festivals, attracting audiences from around the world.

In 2018, the monthlong edition featured over 60 performances and drew approximately 42,000 attendees, according to organizers.

The 2024 program included artists such as Miguel Poveda (returning after 14 years), Farruquito, David Peña Dorantes, and Rafael Riqueni.
