= Diego Bermúdez (singer) =

Spanish flamenco singer (1850–1923)

Diego Bermúdez (1850–1923), known as el Tenazas [English: "the Tongs" or "the Pliers"] or Tío Tenazas ["Uncle" Tenazas] was a Spanish flamenco cantaor [singer]. When already long retired and in his seventies, he nonetheless "vaulted from obscurity to fame in a 1922 flamenco contest."

Born in Moron de la Frontera, El Tenazas learned his art during the era of the legendary cantaor Silverio Franconetti. He had long since retired from performing, due to an injury, when the Concurso de Cante Jondo was scheduled to be held in Granada during June 1922. There he managed to excite and enchant the festival with his style, which recalled a prior age of the Flamenco art. He was awarded a large prize and became widely known in flamenco circles.

He then toured Spain, later returning to his home in Puente Genil where he died the following year.

He was featured on the Travel Channel series "Mysteries at the Castle, Season 3, Episode 10 in 2016.

== See also ==
- Concurso de Cante Jondo: "Events of the Concurso"
