= Pepe Pinto =

Spanish footballer (1929–2024)

Personal information
- Full name: José Pinto Rosas
- Date of birth: 11 November 1929
- Place of birth: Antequera, Spain
- Date of death: 30 November 2024 (aged 95)
- Position: Defender

Youth career
- Antequera
- Logroñés

Senior career*
Years	Team	Apps	(Gls)
- Recreación Logroño
1952–1955	Girona		
1955–1959	Condal	85	(2)
1959–1961	Barcelona	16	(0)
1961–1965	Valladolid	105	(0)
1965–1967	Girona		
Total		206	(2)

Managerial career
- 1974–1975: Manresa
- 1980–1981: Girona
- 1981–1982: Girona
- 1982–1983: Olot
- 1984–1985: Figueres
- 1985–1986: Llagostera
- * Club domestic league appearances and goals

José "Pepe" Pinto Rosas (11 November 1929 – 30 November 2024) was a Spanish footballer who played as a defender, and coach. He died on 30 November 2024, at the age of 95.
