= Ramón Montoya =

Ramón Montoya (November 2, 1879, Madrid, Spain – July 20, 1949, Madrid, Spain) was a Flamenco guitarist and composer.

Born into a family of Gitano (Romani) cattle traders, Ramón Montoya used earnings from working in the trade to purchase his first guitar. He began playing in the cafés de cante before he was twenty years of age.

He formed a partnership with the great flamenco cantaor (singer) Antonio Chacón that started in 1912 and lasted more than a decade. Both participated in the Concurso de Cante Jondo of 1922 held in Granada. These two were largely responsible for establishing the form of the various traditional flamenco cantes that are recognized today.

In traditional flamenco, the guitar was relegated to a supporting role. Cante (singing) and baile (dance) were the main performers whom the guitarist supported. Montoya was one of the first to challenge this role. His strong playing often overpowered the singer whom he accompanied. He eventually took the next logical step and began to play as a solo or lead performer in a concert setting. His performances are widely credited by flamenco historians as establishing the flamenco guitar in this role.

He was the single most influential flamenco guitarist of the 20th century. His innovations made possible the solo careers of such later greats as Sabicas and Paco de Lucía.

He is the uncle of flamenco guitarist Carlos Montoya. His granddaughter, Rosa Montoya, is most known for introducing flamenco dance to most of California with her studio based in San Francisco.

== Selected filmography ==
- Carmen, la de Triana (1938)
