= Antonio Chacón =

Spanish flamenco singer (1869–1929)

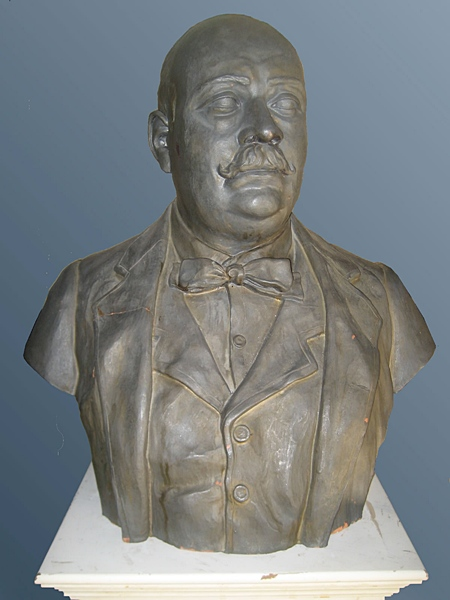
Antonio Chacón Statue

Antonio Chacón (1869–1929) was a Spanish flamenco singer [cantaor].

Chacón was born in Jerez de la Frontera, Cádiz Province. He began earning a living by performing flamenco around 1884. He toured Andalucia with his two friends, the Molina brothers - dancer Antonio Molina, and guitarist Javier Molina. He was later hired by Silverio Franconetti for his café in Seville. He was noted for his skill in singing the cartagenera, malagueñas, granaína and media granaína, which earned him the popular title of "Don".

According to Fernando el de Triana, he was so accomplished that all of the most successful cantaores (singers) performing with him renounced their right of seniority and allowed Chacón to perform last, because the audience would simply leave when he finished. Had they not preceded him, they would have been performing to an empty hall.

He performed with many of the best performers of his era. The great guitarist Ramón Montoya performed as Chacón's accompanist for over a decade until the early 1920s. Another great guitarist, Sabicas, then accompanied him, early in the latter's career.

In 1922 at Granada he participated in the celebrated Concurso de Cante Jondo. Chacón was given the place of honor, presiding over the judges of this flamenco contest. For many the singer Chacón remains "el mejor de todos los tiempos" (the best of all time). He died in Madrid.
