= Manuel Torre =

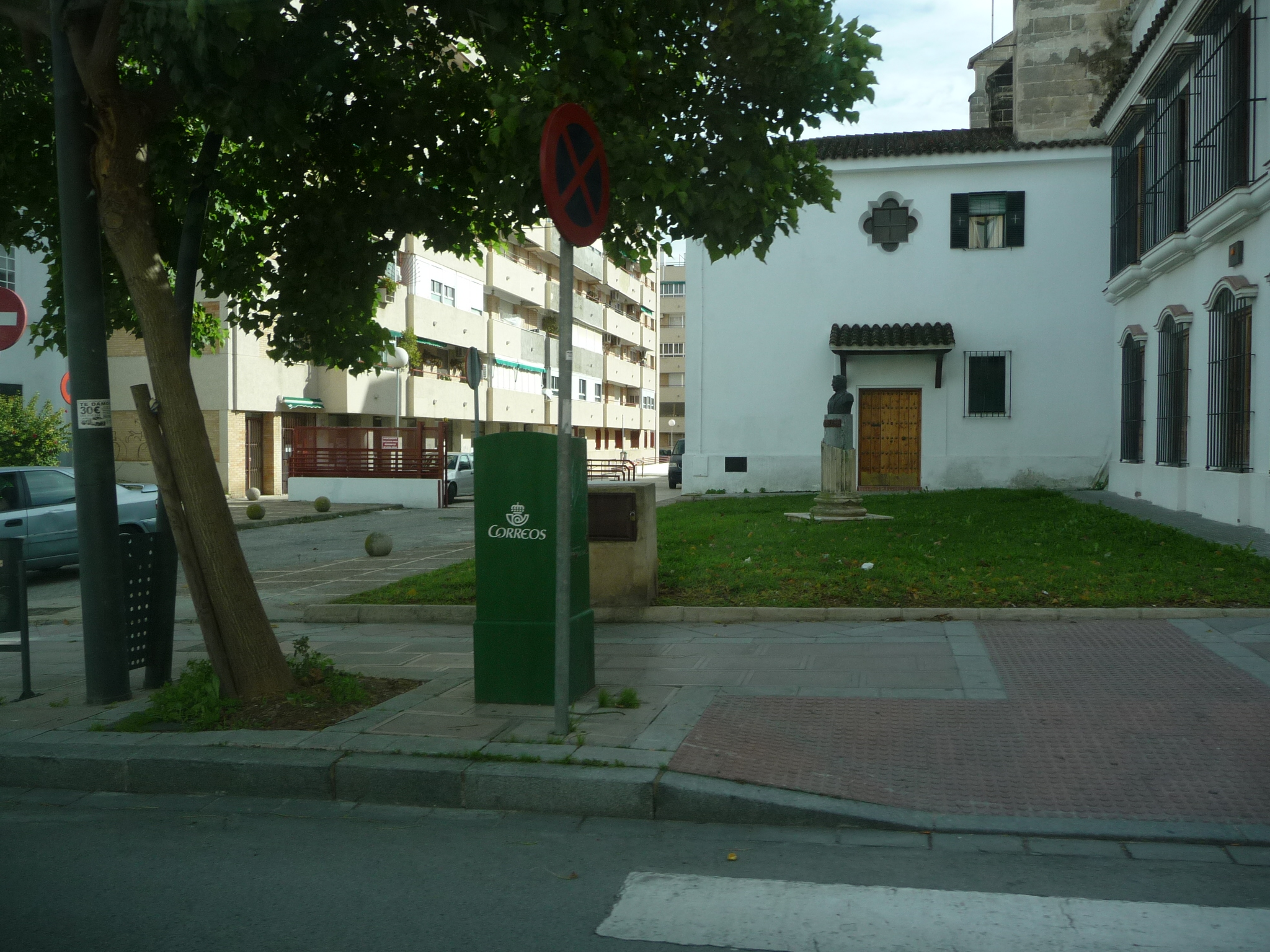
Monument

Manuel Soto Loreto, known as Manuel Torre or Manuel Torres (1878 – 1933), was a Romani (Kalo) flamenco singer.

== Beginning ==
Torre was born in Jerez de la Frontera, Spain, in the neighbourhood of San Miguel, which together with the neighbourhood of Santiago, is a traditional centre of flamenco in Jerez. One of the most representative singers of Jerez, he was influenced by singers Manuel Molina, El Marrurro (from Jerez) and Enrique el Mellizo (from Cádiz). He developed his career in the cafés cantante of Seville. In his turn, he was one of the main influences in the work of singers like La Niña de los Peines, Antonio Mairena or Manuel Agujetas.

== Career ==
Torre was an honored guest, singing the siguiriyas, at the Concurso de Cante Jondo held at the Alhambra in Granada. This 1922 music festival was organized by Manuel de Falla to celebrate the flamenco arts.

An encyclopedic singer, he excelled in siguiriyas, soleá, saetas, and fandangos. However, he rarely entered the recording studio, and his recordings are of irregular quality:

The flamenco fans who have only listened to him in recordings only know his shadow, because he made all those recordings in a state of unconsciousness. (Mairena 1976)

He died in Seville, Spain.

== Discography ==
Historic Recordings / Grabaciones históricas 1909-1931, Empresa Pública de Gestión, 1997 (Complete recordings)

== Sources ==
ÁLVAREZ CABALLERO, Ángel: La discoteca ideal del flamenco, Editorial Planeta, Barcelona, 1995 ISBN 84-08-01602-4

MAIRENA, Antonio: Confesiones de Antonio Mairena, Secretariado de Publicaciones de la Universidad de Sevilla, Seville, 1976 ISBN 84-7405-031-6
