= Silverio Franconetti =

Spanish singer (1831–1889)

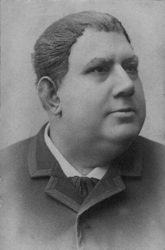
Silverio Franconetti (1875)

Silverio Franconetti y Aguilar, also known simply as Silverio (June 10, 1831 – May 30, 1889) was a singer and the leading figure of the period in flamenco history known as The Golden Age, which was marked by the creation and definition of most musical forms or palos, the increasing professionalization of flamenco artists, and the shift of center from private gatherings and taverns towards commercial venues called cafés cantante. Silverio's voice was called “the honey from Alcarria”.

== Biography ==
Silverio Franconetti was born in Seville. His parents were Nicolás Franconetti, born in Rome, and María de la Concepción Aguilar, born in Alcalá de Guadaira. He spent his childhood in Morón de la Frontera, and he learned to be a tailor. He spent time in his youth with the Gypsies who worked in the forges, listening to their songs. He was particularly influenced by one singer named El Fillo.

He soon decided to quit his job as tailor and start a career as singer in Seville and then in Madrid. At 25 years of age, he moved to Montevideo, Uruguay where he made a living either as soldier or as picador. He went back to Spain in 1864 to resume his career as singer. He started a partnership with Manuel "El Burrero" and both opened a café cantante (also called El Burrero). However, their different criteria soon caused them to break apart: while el Burrero prioritized business, for Silverio artistic quality was all. Soon Silverio opened his own café, the "Café de Silverio", where he invited the most outstanding figures of flamenco of his time, also performing himself regularly. His café gave a definite impulse to the trend of opening cafés cantante, which in a few years became numerous in all Andalusia and also in the rest of Spain. Although he was not the creator of the café cantante, he was the first café owner who tried to dignify these venues:

Firstly, through his own artistic personality, giving these schools a relevance they had not completely achieved [...]. Secondly, dignifying the genre in contrast with most cafés, who admitted artistic elements unrelated to flamenco, and even the flirts of the public with the women, including, quite often, the artists themselves. (Ríos Ruiz 2002)

== His work ==
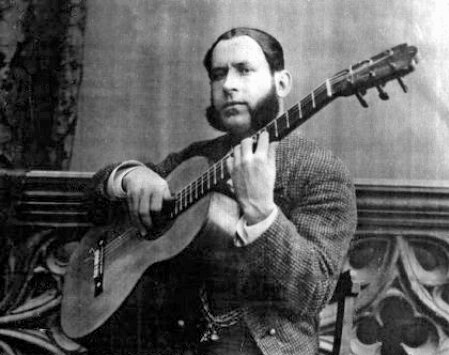
Silverio Franconetti with a guitar.

As a singer, Silverio was deeply influenced by El Fillo, from whom he learnt most of his repertoire. However, according to traditional flamencology, he radically adapted those songs to his own style. However, it is difficult to attribute any of the existing flamenco forms to his creation. The song known as cabal de Silverio is often thought to be a recreation of the cabal attributed to El Fillo. In spite of the debates about possible attribution, he remains the most famous and discussed singer of his time.

His popularization of flamenco through the café cantante was first objected by folklorist Demófilo, who wrote the first biography of Silverio in his book Colección de cantes flamencos. According to Demófilo, the spreading of cafés cantante would sooner or later debase the nature of the genre in spite of Silverio's intention to keep it pure:

"The cafés cantantes will soon kill the Gypsy singing style in the near future, in spite of the giant efforts of the Sevillian singer to rescue it from the obscure sphere where it lived and which it should never have left if it were to be kept pure and authentic. When the Gypsy genre went from the tavern to the café, it received Andalusian influences, and became what everybody now calls flamenco. Silverio has created the flamenco genre, a mixture of Gypsy and Andalusian elements. (Quoted by Molina and Mairena [1963] 1979:31)

And Molina and Mairena added:

... that, as flamenco gained a wider public, the pureness of Gypsy singing would be weakened, is a fact we have to acknowledge. [...] To make singing palatable for the masses, [...] he sweetened the elementary harshness of the abrupt songs from Triana, [...], softening the tragedy of the naked Gypsy scream into brilliant dramatic melody. [...] Then, he probably started, wisely, to cultivate flourishings and ornaments to which audiences, initiated in opera and zarzuela, were sensitive. But still, in Silverio, the Gypsy echo (so near to him!) was dominant.(Quoted by Molina and Mairena [1963] 1979:58)

Later critics, though, disagree:

However, most critics think just the opposite: that precisely Silverio's task was dignifying flamenco singing by rescuing it from brothels and taverns and presenting it with dignity, respect and artistic level. (Ríos Ruiz 2002:32)

== Sources ==
ÁLVAREZ CABALLERO, Ángel: El cante flamenco, Alianza Editorial, Madrid, Second edition, 1998. ISBN 84-206-9682-X

MAIRENA, Antonio & MOLINA, Ricardo: Mundo y formas del cante flamenco, Librería Al-Ándalus, Third Edition, 1979

MARTÍN SALAZAR, Jorge: Los cantes flamencos, Diputación Provincial de Granada, Granada, 1991 ISBN 84-7807-041-9

RÍOS RUIZ, Manuel: El Gran libro del flamenco, Vol. II: Intérpretes, Calambur, Madrid, ISBN 84-88015-99-2
