= Duende (art) =

Spanish term

Duende or tener duende ("to have duende") is a Spanish term for a heightened state of emotion, expression and authenticity, often connected with flamenco. Originating from folkloric Andalusian vocal music (canto jondo) and first theorized and enhanced by Andalusian poet Federico García Lorca, the term derives from "dueño de casa" (master of the house), which similarly inspired the duende of folklore.

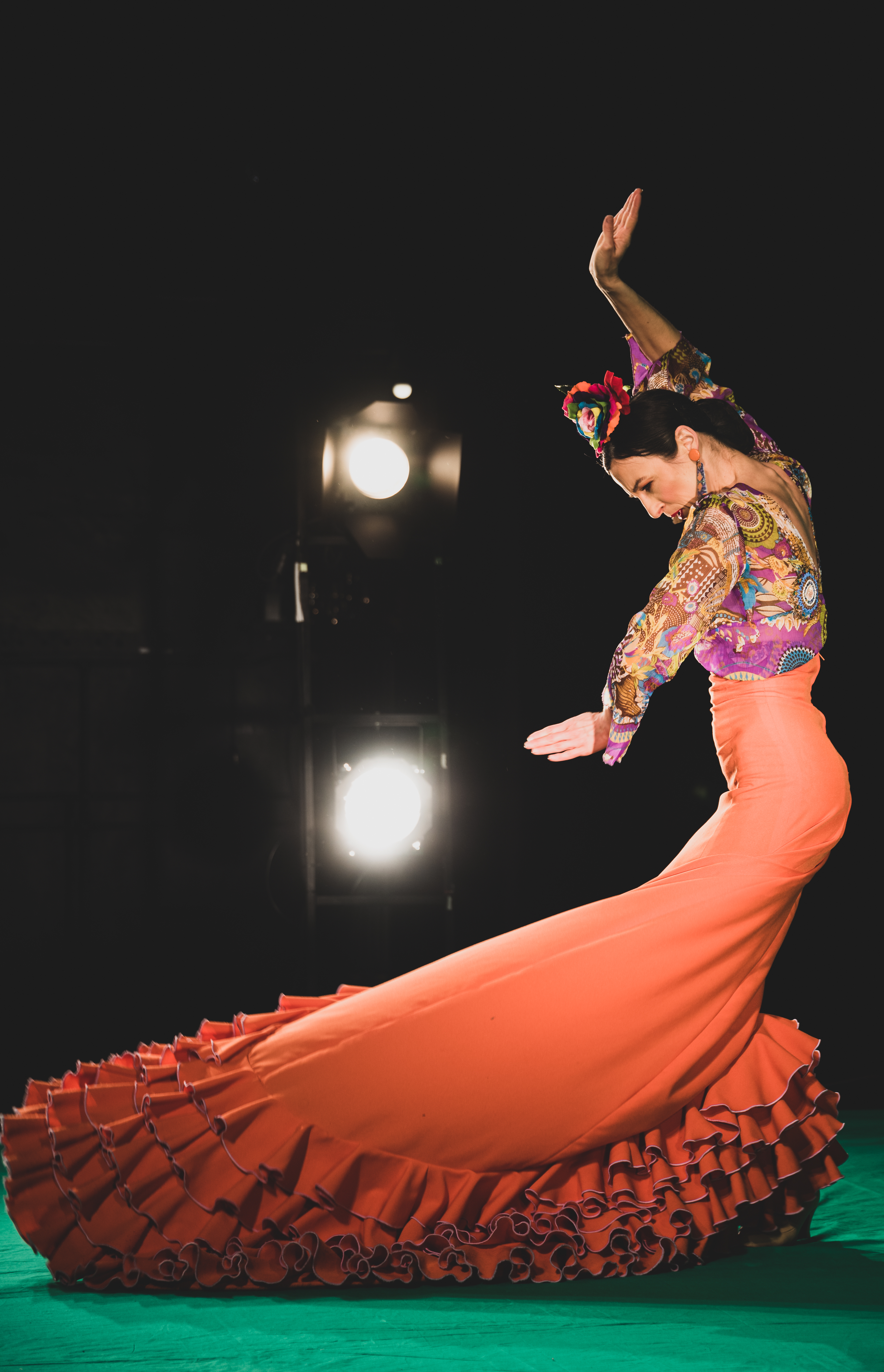
Kalli Pikas dancing flamenco, 2021

== Origins of the term ==
El duende has been defined as the spirit of evocation, "a state of tragedy-inspired ecstasy," "a poetic emotion which is uncontrolled." It comes from inside as a physical/emotional response to art. It is what gives you chills, makes you smile or cry as a bodily reaction to an artistic performance that is particularly expressive. Folk music in general, especially flamenco, tends to embody an authenticity that comes from a people whose culture is enriched by diaspora and hardship; vox populi, the human condition of joys and sorrows. Drawing on popular usage and Spanish folklore, Federico García Lorca first developed the aesthetics of duende in a lecture he gave in Buenos Aires in 1933, "Juego y teoría del duende" ("Play and Theory of the Duende").

According to Christopher Maurer, editor and translator of García Lorca's In Search of Duende, at least four elements can be isolated in Lorca's vision of duende: irrationality, earthiness, a heightened awareness of death, and a dash of the diabolical. The duende is an earth spirit who helps the artist see the limitations of intelligence, reminding them that "ants could eat him or that a great arsenic lobster could fall suddenly on his head"; who brings the artist face-to-face with death, and who helps them create and communicate memorable, spine-chilling art. The duende is seen, in Lorca's lecture, as an alternative to style, to mere virtuosity, to God-given grace and charm (what Spaniards call "ángel"), and to the classical, artistic norms dictated by the Muse. Not that the artist simply surrenders to the duende; they have to battle it skillfully, "on the rim of the well", in "hand-to-hand combat". To a higher degree than the muse or the angel, the duende seizes not only the performer but also the audience, creating conditions where art can be understood spontaneously with little, if any, conscious effort. It is, in Lorca's words, "a sort of corkscrew that can get art into the sensibility of an audience... the very dearest thing that life can offer the intellectual." The critic Brook Zern has written, of a performance of someone with duende, "it dilates the mind's eye, so that the intensity becomes almost unendurable... There is a quality of first-timeness, of reality so heightened and exaggerated that it becomes unreal...".

Lorca writes: "The duende, then, is a power, not a work. It is a struggle, not a thought. I have heard an old maestro of the guitar say, 'The duende is not in the throat; the duende climbs up inside you, from the soles of the feet.' Meaning this: it is not a question of ability, but of true, living style, of blood, of the most ancient culture, of spontaneous creation." Lorca, in his lecture, quotes Manuel Torre: "everything that has black sounds in it, has duende." [i.e. emotional 'darkness'] ... This 'mysterious power which everyone senses and no philosopher explains' is, in sum, the spirit of the earth, the same duende that scorched the heart of Nietzsche, who searched in vain for its external forms on the Rialto Bridge and in the music of Bizet, without knowing that the duende he was pursuing had leaped straight from the Greek mysteries to the dancers of Cadiz or the beheaded, Dionysian scream of Silverio's siguiriya." ... "The duende's arrival always means a radical change in forms. It brings to old planes unknown feelings of freshness, with the quality of something newly created, like a miracle, and it produces an almost religious enthusiasm." ... "All arts are capable of duende, but where it finds greatest range, naturally, is in music, dance, and spoken poetry, for these arts require a living body to interpret them, being forms that are born, die, and open their contours against an exact present."

== Contemporary music ==
According to poet and critic Edward Hirsch, the duende is found in works "with powerful undertow." Hirsch cites Robert Johnson's Delta Blues and Miles Davis's modal approach in Kind of Blue as primary examples of duende. Although perhaps not ideal illustrations of the spirit of the term, the following are examples applied to other contemporary, non-flamenco contexts:

In March 2005 Jan Zwicky (University of Victoria) used the notion of duende in the context of contemporary music at a symposium organised by Continuum Contemporary Music & the Institute for Contemporary Culture at the Royal Ontario Museum, an event televised by Big Ideas:

[The second way music can be new is] when it possesses duende: "black sounds", as Lorca called them, the dark counterpoise to Apollo's light, music in which we hear death sing.... Duende lives in blue notes, in the break in a singer's voice, in the scrape of resined horsehair hitting sheep gut. We are more accustomed to its presence in jazz and the blues, and it is typically a feature of music in performance, or music in which performance and composition are not separate acts. But it is also audible in the work of classically oriented composers who are interested in the physical dimensions of sound, or in sound as a physical property of the world. Even if it is structurally amorphous or naïvely traditional, music whose newness lies in its duende will arrest our attention because of its insistence on honouring the death required to make the song: we sense the gleam of the knife, we smell the blood...

In reflecting on the key images of Western music's two-part invention — the duende of the tortoise and the radiance of Apollonian emotional geometry — we are reminded that originality is truly radical, that it comes from the root, from the mythic origins of the art.
(Note: in Greek mythology, Hermes killed a tortoise to create the first lyre, which he traded to Apollo who was enamored by its music.).

Australian music artist Nick Cave discussed his interpretation of duende in his lecture pertaining to the nature of the love song (Vienna, 1999):

In his brilliant lecture entitled "The Theory and Function of Duende" Federico García Lorca attempts to shed some light on the eerie and inexplicable sadness that lives in the heart of certain works of art. "All that has dark sound has duende", he says, "that mysterious power that everyone feels but no philosopher can explain." In contemporary rock music, the area in which I operate, music seems less inclined to have its soul, restless and quivering, the sadness that Lorca talks about. Excitement, often; anger, sometimes: but true sadness, rarely, Bob Dylan has always had it. Leonard Cohen deals specifically in it. It pursues Van Morrison like a black dog and though he tries to he cannot escape it. Tom Waits and Neil Young can summon it. It haunts Polly Harvey. My friends the Dirty Three have it by the bucket load. The band Spiritualized are excited by it. Tindersticks desperately want it, but all in all it would appear that duende is too fragile to survive the brutality of technology and the ever increasing acceleration of the music industry. Perhaps there is just no money in sadness, no dollars in duende. Sadness or duende needs space to breathe. Melancholy hates haste and floats in silence. It must be handled with care."

All love songs must contain duende. For the love song is never truly happy. It must first embrace the potential for pain. Those songs that speak of love without having within their lines an ache or a sigh are not love songs at all but rather Hate Songs disguised as love songs, and are not to be trusted. These songs deny us our humanness and our God-given right to be sad and the air-waves are littered with them. The love song must resonate with the susurration of sorrow, the tintinnabulation of grief. The writer who refuses to explore the darker regions of the heart will never be able to write convincingly about the wonder, the magic and the joy of love for just as goodness cannot be trusted unless it has breathed the same air as evil — the enduring metaphor of Christ crucified between two criminals comes to mind here — so within the fabric of the love song, within its melody, its lyric, one must sense an acknowledgement of its capacity for suffering.

== Contemporary literature ==
- The duende appears frequently in Giannina Braschi's poetry, drama, and philosophy. In Empire of Dreams, the duende appears in pastoral poems as well as in the ars poetica ("Poetry is this screaming madwoman"). In her book United States of Banana, Braschi writes a lyric essay about the "Hierarchy of Inspiration", which features the duende, angel, muse, and demon as distinct forces of artistic inspiration. She also published a treatise on the poet-artist about Lorca's treatment of the duende.
- American novelist Ursula K. Le Guin published a poem entitled, "Lorca's Duende" (2011).
- Pulitzer prize winning poet Tracy K. Smith published a book of poetry about desire, entitled Duende (2018); the collection opens with a quote from Lorca about the duende.

== See also ==
- Flamenco

== Sources ==
- Hirsch, Edward (2003) The Demon and the Angel: Searching for the Source of Artistic Inspiration. Harcourt Brace International. ISBN 0-15-602744-5
- Nick Cave's Love Song Lecture, October 21, 2000
- García Lorca, Federico; Maurer, Christopher (Ed.) (1998) In Search of Duende. New Directions ISBN 0-8112-1376-5
