= Antonio Mairena =

Spanish musician (1909–1983)

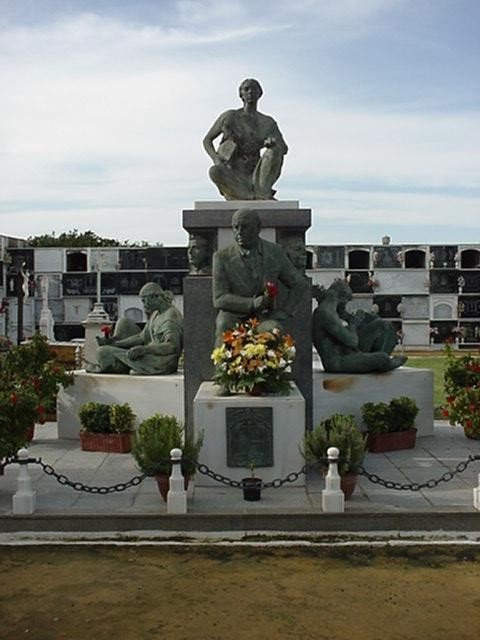

Background information
- Born: Antonio Cruz García; 1909; Mairena del Alcor, Seville Province, Spain
- Died: 1983 (aged 73–74) Seville, Spain
- Genres: Flamenco
- Occupation: Singer

Antonio Cruz García, known as Antonio Mairena (7 September 1909 – 5 September 1983), was a Spanish musician, who tried to rescue a type of flamenco, which he considered to be pure or authentic. He rescued or recreated a high number of songs that had been almost lost, and also published several books and articles to divulge his views on flamenco and flamenco history. He considered himself as heir to the art of Manuel Torre, the most classic flamenco singer from Jerez, and also acknowledged the influence of other masters like Tomás Pavón or Joaquín el de la Paula.

== Early life and career ==
Mairena was born in Mairena del Alcor, Seville Province, Spain.

He won several awards, the most important of which was the Llave de Oro del Cante (Gold Key of Flamenco Singing), which he obtained in the third Concurso de Córdoba (Contest of Córdoba). It is common belief that the contest was organized especially to grant him the award, and that the appearance of a contest was contrived to have a good excuse to grant him this honour, although some flamenco historians justify this on the grounds that he deserved the award for the service he had rendered to the art of flamenco (Álvarez Caballero 1995).

He died in Seville, aged 73.

== Discography ==
- Fiesta por bulerías y fandangos (1941)
- Bulerías y fandangos (1941)
- Disco de Tánger (1944)
- Bulerías y soleares (1950)
- Bulerías jerezanas y fandangos (1950)
- Alegrías y seguidillas (1950)
- Bulerías y soleares (1950)
- Con Antonio y Carmen Rojas al baile (1952)
- Disco de Londres (1954)
- Cantes de Antonio Mairena (1958)
- Sevilla cuna del cante flamenco (1959)
- Cinco grabaciones en disco de amianto para uso personal de Antonio Mairena (1960)
- Antología del cante flamenco y cante gitano dirigida por Antonio Mairena (1960)
- Duendes del cante de Triana (1963)
- Noches de la Alameda (1963)
- Tangos de Andalucía (1963)
- La llave de oro del cante flamenco (1964)
- Cien años de cante gitano (1965)
- La gran historia del cante gitano-andaluz (3LP) (1966)
- Sevilla por bulerías (1967)
- Festival de Cante Jondo Antonio Mairena (1967)
- Misa flamenca en Sevilla (1968)
- Mi cante por Saetas (1969)
- Honores a la Niña de los Peines (1969)
- Mis recuerdos de Manuel Torre (1970)
- La fragua de los Mairenas (1970)
- Cantes festeros de Antonio Mairena (1972)
- Grandes estilos flamencos (1972)
- Antonio Mairena y el cante de Jerez (1972)
- Cantes de Cádiz y los Puertos (1973)
- Triana, raíz del Cante (1973)
- Grabación de su participación en el Festival de la Unión (1974)
- Esquema histórico del cante por siguiriyas y soleares (1976)
- El calor de mis recuerdos (1983)

== Sources ==
ÁLVAREZ CABALLERO, Ángel: La discoteca ideal del flamenco, Editorial Planeta, Barcelona, 1995 ISBN 84-08-01602-4
