= Josefa Díaz Fernández =

Spanish flamenco singer (1871–1918)

- Born: January 29, 1871; Cádiz, Spain
- Died: May 18, 1918 (aged 47); Cádiz, Spain
- Other names: Pepa de Oro
- Occupations: Flamenco dancer and singer
- Spouse: Esteban de Jerez
- Parents: Francisco Díaz García "Paco de Oro" (father); Agustina Fernández Fernández (mother)

Josefa Díaz Fernández, popularly known as Pepa de Oro, (Cádiz, 29 January 1871 – Cádiz, 18 May 1918), was a Spanish flamenco dancer and singer.

She shot to fame when she introduced Spain to the first milongas aflamencadas of Argentine folklore in 1904.

== Biography ==
Josefa Díaz Fernández, Pepa de Oro, was born in Cádiz on 29 January 1871. She was the daughter of the bullfighter Francisco Díaz García, Paco de Oro, and the flamenco singer Agustina Fernández Fernández. Pepa de Oro, was better known for her role in the world of dance than in that of folk singing. As young girl she accompanied her father in the bullfighting seasons of Latin America. There she encountered and absorbed milonga folk singing and gave it its unique style, mastering the rhythm of the tango; and she is credited for the creation of the flamenco milonga.

Her grandfather, on her father’s side, was the bullfighter Gaspar Díaz Cantoral also known as Lavi, and her great-grandparents were the bullfighters, José Díaz Jorge, known as Agualimpia, and the flamenco singer María Cantoral Valencia, la Cantorala, both of whom were gypsies. Another brother of her grandfather, Gaspar was another bullfighter, Manuel Díaz Lavi, and one of their sisters was Gabriela, who married the bullfighter José Gabriel Ortega, known as Chicuco, and whose marriagewas the beginning of the Ortega dynasty of Cádiz, where bullfighters, singers and dancers were born in abundance, like Rafael el Gallo, Joselito el Cuco, Barrambín and Lillo, in bullfighting; Manolo Caracol, Enrique Ortega el Gordo, Jacoba, Ortega el Viejo and Joselito de la Morala, in folk singing; and Gabriela, Rita, Carlota, Rosario, Regla, Rafael Ortega, Ines la del Columpio and a long list of others in dancing.

Her mother's brothers were the great singers María Fernández, La Borrico, and Pedro Fernández, known as El Viejo de la Isla.

After her mother's death in 1873, when she was 21, her father married Juana Vargas Ceda. At that point, her father and Juana did not reside in the same house, so they had to start poverty file proceedings. María Ceda, Juana's mother, was responsible for raising her, along with her stepsister, Antonia Díaz Vargas, born in 1884.

Pepa de Oro was a very popular figure in the “cafés cantante” in Jerez de la Frontera, Cádiz, Málaga, Sevilla, Madrid... In 1885 she was already In full artistic swing in the Café de Caviedes, receiving great applause from the fans who filled the cafés night after night.

Juan Junquera, from Jerez de la Frontera, became Pepa de Oro’s manager and organised her a tour around Argentina. Upon her return to Spain, Pepa de Oro had adapted the Argentinian milonga to her most peculiar musical style, Flamenco, and she offered shows with the milonga as the main act everywhere she performed. In those days, Pepa got to perform in the Salón Filarmónico in Seville, where she shared the stage with artists such as Enriqueta la Macaca, Carmen la Pichira, Carlota Ortega or Antonia Gallardo la Coquinera, among others.

In her youth, Pepa de Oro married a banderillero. After her first husband died, she married Esteban de Jerez¸ whom she later divorced. Finally, she lived with a flamenco singer from Seville known as El Macareno. Both set up a hostel in Madrid. This business did not go as expected, so Pepa decided to go back to her hometown, Cádiz. She left the music world, despite struggling financially.

She died at the age of 47, on May 25, 1918 in Cádiz.

== The milonga ==
=== History of the milonga ===
The milonga flamenca is considered as a musical style derived from flamenco, introduced in Spain by the colonists, the deported, artists and soldiers who went back to Spain from the colonies by the end of the 19th century, reminiscing in their music the memories of American lands.

The Argentinian milonga is a famous cantabile style and comes from the “payada de contrapunto”, having deep connections with the habanera and the tango antillano at a metrical-rhythmical and harmonious angle.

From a musical perspective, it is more interesting the flamenco touch of a foreign music, though it keeps the original rhythm and accent.

The milonga followed an evolutive process that probably had its origins in the yaravi and other styles such as triste and cifra. In 1860, triste became milonga¸ and it was between 1880 and 1910 that the milonga reached the top.

=== Rhythm ===
As the vidalita, milonga is based in the metric of the tango-tientos, sometimes going against its characteristic free flowing rhythm.

=== Tonality ===
The first type of milonga has a base of flamenco and ends with the rumbita, giving the dance side to the style.

The second type is more unhurried in its tempo and has a minor tonality, closer to the style of the vidalita. Nevertheless, the tonal ambiguity between the major and the minor at some parts of the singing process is a characteristic feature of the milonga, which usually ends up in minor.

The harmonious scheme is based in the alternation between tonic and dominant with variations established by each artist.

People usually cannot differentiate between milongas and vidalitas. This confusion is mainly due to two aspects: the similar rhythmic and melodic nature of both styles and the mention of vidalita in some milonga coplas.

Another characteristic of milongas and vidalitas is the performance by a Spanish guitar of an appoggiatura from the ninth chord to the eighth in the fourth string (on top). That is a paradigmatic element of flamenco milongas and vidalitas, which also plays to the accompaniment of the Argentinian milonga.

=== Pepa de Oro's milonga ===
The first true flamenco milonga and tango-tiento beat is the one Pepa de Oro made popular at the end of the 19th Century. She merged it with the choreographic milonga for it to be sung at the same time it is danced.

This folk singing has two distinguished parts: the first is the true milonga with its sequence of verses about a brief melodic motif, and the second the final rumbita.

== Homages ==
Pepe de la Matrona (1887 – 1980), flamenco singer, recalled Pepa de Oro’s folk singing and was presented clean of the excipients which characterized the marchenista folk singing.

The Concurso Nacional de Arte Flamenco de Córdoba (National Competition of Flamenco Art in Córdoba, Spain) created in its 13th Edition (1992) the “Pepa de Oro Award” first prize for guajiras, punto guajiro o punto cubano, colombianas, and second place for milongas and vidalitas

Since the 13th Edition coincided with the celebration of the 5th Centenary of America, it was decided that a new group in the section of “folk singing” be added: cante de ida y vuelta.

Finding a name for this new category sparked a great debate. On the one hand, the “cantes de ida y vuelta” was the last artistic creation that the genre had had. Its most powerful defenders had been some flamenco divos, those who gave it harmonious and theatrical worth. Zarzuela and Género Chico were two of the many inspirations.

On the other hand, the Contest in Córdoba had a challenge: not to name the “cantes de ida y vuelta” as Niño de Marchena. Suddenly, the name of Pepa de Oro rose up and won the debate.

Fernando el de Triana, writer, librettist, and flamenco singer and guitarist wrote the following in his book “Arte y artistas flamencos” (1935):

"Pepa was a leading flamenco dancer and arrogant figure and, though she was not a gypsy, anyone would have assumed that she was cañí. As her best show, she sang and danced at the same time milongas with tango beat. The audience applauded with great enthusiasm."

This time the author was wrong: she was indeed from a gypsy family, and therefore a gypsy herself.

In January 2018, the Cádiz City Council, at the request of the director of Culture and the “El Buen Compás” association, approved the name change of the “Beni de Cádiz” square in the Santa María neighborhood to the “Pepa de Oro” square.
