= Los Tarantos (tablao) =

- Formation: 1963
- Headquarters: Plaza Real 17
- Location: Barcelona, Spain
- Services: Leisure venue: Flamenco tablao

Los Tarantos is a flamenco tablao in Barcelona, Spain. Founded in 1963, it is considered the oldest tablao in the city and has hosted performances by the leading figures in the genre.

== History ==
The venue was founded by Marta Vilardell in 1963. Its name refers to the tarantos a flamenco style that originated in the mining areas of Almería, and to the 1962 film Los Tarantos, starring Carmen Amaya, which was shot in Barcelona.

In its early days, leading figures in flamenco singing and dancing performed there: Antonio Gades, La Tolea, the guitarists Andrés Batista and Pepe Pubill, and the singers Fosforito and Pepe Cortés. Maruja Garrido was the main artist during the 1970s.

In the 1990s, the Mas i Mas group, which is owned by the Mas family, took over the management of this venue and other leisure establishments in Plaza Real after acquiring them. Following its modernisation, the venue hosted performances by Miguel Poveda, Montse Cortés and José el Francés. Changes introduced at that time included programming short 40-minute shows. The tablao's commercial operations are managed by Tarantos Jamboree SL, a company within the Mas i Mas group.

The tablao has welcomed many prominent customers, including Tom Jones, Paul McCartney and Cassius Clay.
