= Zapateado (Spain) =

Dance and music of Andalusian origin

Zapateado is a style of dance and traditional music of Andalusian origins in metre 6/8, with lively movement, marked on two beats, the second being very stressed. The dance shows a gracious tapping. Humanists of 16th century affirmed that zapateado derived from the lactisma of the Roman dancers in times of the Empire.

Among the composers who write Spanish Zapateados is Paco de Lucía, whose Percusión Flamenca is a very popular piece for guitar and orchestra. Pablo de Sarasate composed a Zapateado for violin and piano as part of his Spanish Dances, Op. 23. The piece is replete with harmonics, double stops, left hand pizzicatos, and is often performed by young virtuosos.

In flamenco, zapateado also refers to a style of dancing which accents the percussive effect of the footwork (zapatear is a Spanish verb, and zapato means "shoe"). In the footwork of particular zapateado, "the dancer and the guitarists work together in unison, building from simple foot taps and bell-like guitar tones to rapid and complex steps on a repeated melodic theme."

== See also ==
- Flamenco zapateado notation
- Zapateado (Mexico)
