= Manuel Cano Tamayo =

Spanish flamenco guitarist

- Born: 1925; Granada
- Died: 1990 (aged 64–65); Granada
- Movement: Flamenco
- Awards: Medal of Andalusia in a posthumous capacity.

Manuel Cano Tamayo (Granada, February 23, 1925 - January 12, 1990) was a Spanish flamenco guitarist, composer and music teacher.

== Biography ==
Born into a family where musical performance was the order of the day (his father played the guitar and his mother the lute), he received his first guitar at the age of seven from his grandfather. He studied industrial surveying, in order to help his family, so he began his professional career as a guitarist late in the 1950s. He won the chair of flamenco guitar at the Conservatorio Superior de Música "Rafael Orozco" in Córdoba by competitive examination, which allowed him to dedicate himself to training while composing. He published about twenty LP's, among them, Evocación de la guitarra de Ramón Montoya (International Flamenco Record Award).

He toured Europe and Japan giving concerts, with great success. In 1965 he was awarded the Sabicas Guitar Prize at the Concurso Nacional de Arte Flamenco cordobés. In 1986 he published the book La guitarra, historia, estudio y aproximaciones al arte flamenco (The guitar, history, study and approaches to flamenco art), a key work in the study of the flamenco guitar. Thanks to the book, he was awarded the research prize of the Chair of Flamencology of Jerez. He was also a full member of the Royal Academy of Fine Arts of Granada and an advisor to Unesco.

In 1992 he was awarded the Medal of Andalusia posthumously, for being considered a "brilliant instrumentalist, a scholar of Andalusian folklore and a teacher for future generations".
