= Cancanilla de Marbella =

Spanish Romani singer and dancer

Sebastián Heredia Santiago, better known by the artistic name Cancanilla de Marbella who was born 1951, in Marbella is a Spanish Romani singer and dancer based in Madrid.

== Career ==
Santiago comes from a family of flamenco roots. He is son of the cantaora María Santiago and brother of "La Chichi" and "Taroque", both dedicated to flamenco dancing and now retired from the stage. He started at the age of eleven in the tablao El Platero, in his home town, signing and dancing for tourists.

At age 15, he traveled to North America with the cast of José Greco and later with Lola Flores. He stayed two years in Mexico, where he worked in a tablao.

In Madrid, he worked in tablao Los Canasteros de Manolo Caracol and in Corral de la Morería, with the dancer Blanca del Rey, and gained a reputation in the flamenco dance scene. Together with Javier Barón, he won the first Giraldillo de Baile at the Bienal de Sevilla. He studied to sing solo and won several awards, most prominently the Premio Enrique El Mellizo at the Concurso Nacional de Arte Flamenco de Córdoba in 1998.

Cancanilla has a wide repertoire, with knowledge of the different styles of flamenco, as well as a great command of compás with a typical aesthetic of the school of Mairena. His singing includes styles from Cádiz to Alcalá de Guadaíra, that is, from El Mellizo to Joaquín el de la Paula, passing through Frijones, Joaniquín, La Serneta and Yllanda. Some lyrics are similar to the border romances of the Middle Ages and the Renaissance.

Cancanilla has worked for most of his life in cante atrás, or singing for dancing, especially in the intimate setting of the tablao. In 2005, he decided to dedicate himself exclusively to solo singing. He has released two collective albums and four solo albums.

He released his first album at the end of the 1980s. In 1993, he recorded a second album with Enrique de Melchor. He took part in the Historical Recordings (Vol. 42) and in 2003 he released Sonido gitano de Málaga. In 2007, he began working on a new album, El Cante de Cancanilla. It belongs to the collection recorded in the label "Fontana" in 1972, and has been reedited by José Manuel Gamboa, with a selection of the following songs: alegrías, tangos, natural fandangos, tarantos, bulerías de Marbella (bulerías with personal details whose lyrics allude to Marbella), seguiriyas, tientos, soleá (to dance), bulerías and fandangos de Huelva. He has shared the stage with Camarón, Fosforito, José Mercé, José Menese, Chano Lobato, and Vicente Soto among others.
