= Conservatori Superior de Música =

The Conservatori Superior de Música may refer to:

- Conservatori Superior de Música del Liceu
- Conservatori Superior de Música, a former name of the Córdoba Conservatory
