= Taranto (flamenco style) =

The taranto is a flamenco style that originates from the province of Almería in Andalusia, Spain. It descends from the taranta and differs from it in that it adheres slightly to a compás, making it possible to dance to, in a similar way to the zambra Mora.

== Beginnings ==
It is believed that the first person to sing it was Pedro el Morato, born in the 1830s. El Cabogatero, born in the province of Almería in 1810 and died in 1880, is also considered to have been one of the first tarantero singers. Another prominent figure is El Ciego de la Playa, who was born around 1840. In his old age, he begged in the capital of Almería with his guitar. Another prominent figure is Juan Abad Díaz, also known as “Chilares”, who was born in 1868 in the Zapillo neighbourhood of Almería.

'At first, it must have been sung freely. Then the guitar came along to accompany a series of nuances in the singing, adding melismas and improving the rhythm. This eliminated the dryness that was a consequence of its foundation and social situation. I think it was originally a simple song due to its social context, which is why it cannot be classified as folkloric." Antonio Mairena

Antonio Mairena considers Taranto to be the Sistine Chapel of flamenco singing. The taranto originated in the mining region of Almería and is considered one of the 'songs of the mines', alongside the fandango and the taranta.

== Development and dissemination ==
Between the 19th and 20th centuries, flamenco singing nights in the capital of Almería were mainly held in three cafés: the "Frailito", located in the Plaza de Santo Domingo and open to the public from 1875; the "España", on Calle Sebastián Pérez (now General Rada); and the "Lyon de Oro". Today, the El Taranto flamenco peña flamenca is responsible for keeping the tradition of Almerian singing alive.

The popularity of the taranto dance spread later, when it was performed by dancers. Carmen Amaya is considered the mother of the taranto dance, which emerged around the 1940s.

Emilio Lafuente Alcántara (1825–1868) was the first person to refer to the taranto as a miners' song in his Cante de Mineros (Miners' Songs) from 1865. In this work, he included the following lyrics from Almería:

Hermosa Virgen de Gádor

que estás al pie de la sierra,

ruega por los mineritos

que están debajo de tierra.

The reaffirmation and dissemination of the taranto was greatly influenced by the fact that Guillermo Núñez de Prado (1874–1915), from Montilla wrote its most famous copla in 1904. This was later sung and recorded by Manuel Torre:

Ese muchacho

Son las tres de la mañana

¿Dónde estará ese muchacho?

Si estará bebiendo vino,

Y andará por ahí borracho.

== Relationships between taranto and songs from regions bordering Almería ==
Taranto developed relationships with styles from the Murcia region, with mining life and singers such as Chilares and El Morato — who lived between Almería and Cartagena — acting as a connecting link. Not to mention Rojo El Alpargatero (Callosa del Segura, Alicante, 1847–1907), who spent most of his life in Almería.

Influences were also exchanged with Jaén and the areas around Linares and La Carolina. Here, the miners and taranteros of Almería came into contact with renowned singers from Jaén, such as Basilio, 'El Tonto de Linares', Los Heredia, El Bacalao, Luis Soriano and Los Taranteros de Almería. The Almería-Linares mining railway served as the connecting link.

To the west, there is a significant flamenco exchange with the Málaga region, which resulted in the Almería casino hiring the singer La Rubia in 1881. This probably explains the clear influence of El Ciego de la Playa's singing on El Canario's (Manuel Reyes Osuna) malagueña, La Rubia's lover.

Interestingly, Antonio Chacón, a renowned flamenco singer from the late 19th and early 20th centuries, was a wealthy man who travelled throughout Andalusia, learning the songs of the different regions. He travelled to Almería to learn the local songs and ended up learning the taranto from El Ciego de la Playa, a notorious character from the city who was known for begging and causing trouble. This story is recounted in the novel El Ciego de la Playa by Francisco Blanes García (Entrelíneas Editores, 2008).

== See also ==
- Los Tarantos, a 1962 film in which Tarantos and Zorongos are rival gypsy families.
- Los Tarantos (Tablao), in Barcelona
