= Guajira (flamenco) =

Guajira (Flamenco) is a palo based on the Cuban Punto Guajira Cubana. It is in 12 beats and feels like it starts on 12. The guajira is a prime example of so-called cantes de ida y vuelta. The flamenco guajira is the adaptation to Melos flamenco of the Cuban point, the peasant point, a genre that brings together a series of songs called Guajiros that are grown in the rural areas of the island of Cuba. A guajira is simply a song for voice and guitar with a series of similar letras.

The guajira is traditionally danced. The dancer will often use a large Spanish fan. The fan is twirled and otherwise manipulated throughout the dance, adding an elegant and flirtatious air.

== Structure ==
Like all flamenco palos, the guajira has a clear structure and consists of beginning, middle and end. The guajira usually begins with an introductory section (falseta) by the guitar which is based on the basic guajira harmony. The guitar resolves into the characteristic guajira chord pattern, over which the singer will sing the instantly recognizable salida. The dancer enters during the guitarist's falseta or during the salida. The fluid nature of the choreography also allows for improvisation within the structure, including danced falsetas, and escobillas performed a palo seco.

== Compás ==
The compás, is a twelve-count pattern starting on beat 12 with accents on beats:

1 2 3 4 5 6 7 8 9 10 11 12

== Palmas ==
The standard palmas for soleá por bulerías are the same as the palmas for the alegrías:

12 + 1 + 2 + 3 + 4 + 5 + 6 + 7 + 8 + 9 + 10 + 11 +

== Letras ==
Here is a guajira lyric.

“Contigo me caso indiana

si se entera tu papa

y se lo dice a tu mama

hermosísima cubana

tengo una casa en la Habana

destinada para tí.

Ay! con el techo de marfil

y el piso de plataforma

para tí blanca paloma

llevo yo la flor de lis.

Me gusta por la mañana

después del café bebio

pasearme por la Habana

con mi cigarro encendío

y sentarme muy tranquilo

en mi silla o mi sillón

y comprarme un papelón

de esos que llaman diario

y parezco un millonario

rico de la población”.
