= Pepe Marchena =

Spanish flamenco singer (1903–1976)

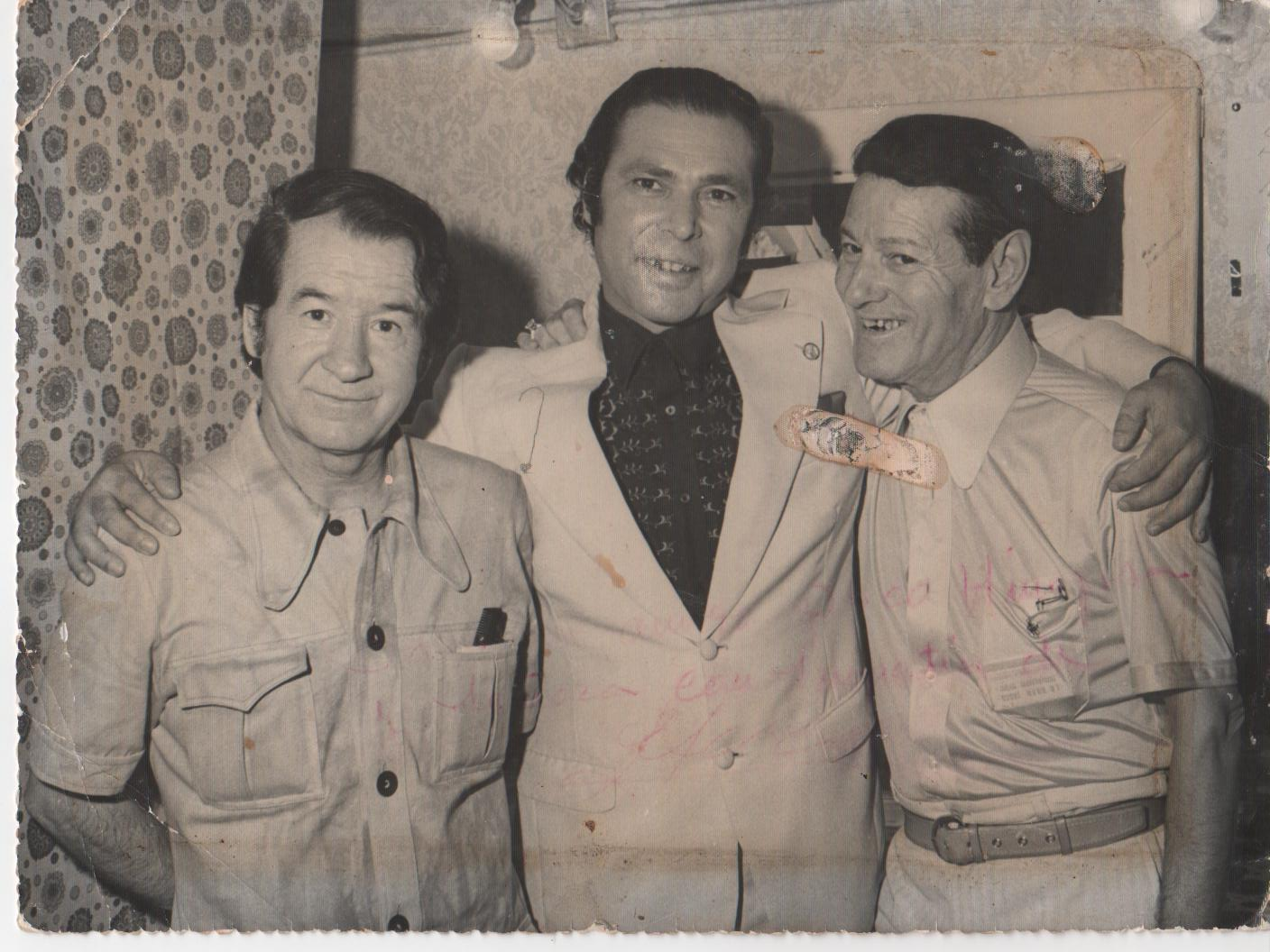
- From left to right: Juanito Valderrama, Juan el de la Vara and Pepe Marchena.

Background information
- Also known as: Pepe Marchena
- Born: José Tejada Martín; November 7, 1903; Marchena, Seville Province, Andalusia, Spain
- Died: December 4, 1976 (aged 73) Seville, Andalusia, Spain
- Genres: Flamenco, Andalusian copla
- Occupations: Singer, songwriter, actor
- Years active: 1910s–1970s

José Tejada Marín (November 7, 1903 – December 4, 1976), known as Pepe Marchena and also as Niño de Marchena in the first years of his career, was a Spanish flamenco singer who achieved great success in the ópera flamenca period (1922–1956). Influenced by singers like Antonio Chacón, he carried to the extreme the tendency to a more mellow and ornamented style of flamenco singing. Owing to his particular vocal conditions and singing style, he excelled mainly in palos (styles) like fandangos, cantes de ida y vuelta and cantes libres, contributing to making them the most popular flamenco styles in the era of the ópera flamenca, and created a new cante de ida y vuelta, the colombiana, later recorded by many other artists like El Lebrijano or Enrique Morente. He was also the first flamenco singer to use an orchestra to accompany flamenco singing, though later he returned to the guitar.

Marchena also revolutionized the public image of the flamenco singer: he was the first to sing standing on the stage (instead of sitting on a chair as had always been usual in flamenco), and often wore unusual outfits, such as riding clothes. Both his singing style and public attitudes were widely imitated at the time, to the extent that the period has often been identified as the era of marchenismo. He was the first real popular star of flamenco singing. Until he appeared in the flamenco scene, flamenco was restricted to small venues and theatres, whereas he could attract the masses to fill large theatres and even bullrings.

== Biography ==
Pepe Marchena started working in menial jobs as boy, alternating them with live performances in taverns for a few coins, until he won a contest for amateurs in Fuentes de Andalucía. After that, he started to work as a professional in cafés and theatres in Andalusia. In 1922, one year after his successful début in Madrid, he started singing in Teatro La Latina, with a 200 pesetas daily salary, a large sum at the time. Also in 1922, he made his first recording, and took part in the show Málaga, ciudad bravía at Teatro Martín, with guitarist Ramón Montoya. In June, he sang for the King and Queen of Italy during their visit to Spain, together with Antonio Chacón, Pastora Imperio, La Niña de los Peines and Manuel Escacena. During the twenties and thirties, he toured Spain intensively, forming part of the cast of several flamenco theatre plays like La copla andaluza (1929) and later in films (Paloma de mis amores, 1935), thus becoming the first flamenco actor-singer.

After the Spanish Civil War, he made two films: La Dolores and Martingala, and came back to the theatre in 1943 with La encontré en la serranía. In 1945 he visited Buenos Aires with the show Feria de Sevilla, together with Carmen Amaya, which stayed in the Teatro Avenida for three months, and finished his Latin American tour in Montevideo and Rio de Janeiro. In 1950 he accomplished a rare achievement for flamenco singers at the time: he started a tour in Morocco and Algeria, which was followed by concerts in Paris. During the 1950s he kept touring Spain with several concerts and theatre shows.

In 1961, he travelled to Karachi, Pakistan, to illustrate a lecture by Aziz Balouch, a Pakistani musicologist and Sufi philosophy student who had come to Spain to study flamenco and enjoyed temporary success as a flamenco singer. In 1965 and 1966 he toured with show Así Canta Andalucía, taking it again to Morocco and France. Towards the end of the decade of the sixties he reduced the number of his performances. In 1974, he received an homage in his hometown of Marchena, where singers like Juan Valderrama and Perlita de Huelva took part. In 1976, already ill with cancer, he received the Gold Medal of Marchena and Juan Valderrama organized a festival in his benefit, with the participation of several artists. He died in December of that same year. In 1986, a monument in his honour was erected in Marchena.

== His work ==
Pepe Marchena has probably been the most controversial flamenco singer in the 20th century. Although he has usually been considered as one of the prototypical non-Gypsy flamenco singers, Manuel de Falla, a lover of Gypsy singing, said of him: "In the Niño de Marchena, with the crystal clear pureness of a mountain spring, we find the inexhaustible charm of the authentic Andalusian singing, without the obstacles that diminish it when it is locked up in futile songs." And Leopold Stokowsky affirmed: "Niño de Marchena has the emotion of the plain chant expressed by a genius interpreter. If his prodigious fioritura could be taken to the score, he would astonish the world."

After becoming very popular in the times of ópera flamenca, his singing was later disparaged by many artists and flamencologists of the Época de revalorización (the period of revival of flamenco orthodoxy from the 1950s to the 1970s), who considered that the primitiveness of Gypsy singing was more orthodox and pure than the virtuosity and mellowness characteristic of Marchena and other singers of the ópera flamenca:

With so much softening and sweetening the singing, Pepe Marchena made it superficial, mere artifice. His style had to be more convincing in minor genres: the fandango and the fandanguillo, the airs coming form America, the less heavy songs from Málaga and Eastern Andalusia... He imposed the "pretty" style of singing based on trills and warbles, falsetto and ornaments; he took "personal creation" to the extreme, to the point of feeding eighty per cent of the ópera flamenca; he introduced reciting, another innovation with abominable sequels; he invented mixtures of styles that have never been tried before... Marchena's heterodoxy is obvious. His singing was almost totally frivolous, personal possession, closed shop. Untransferable, in some way, even if an army of imitators followed him and succeeded in the times of "marchenismo", and took his school to pure plagiarism with no creativity, to a real cul-de-sac.

During the 1990s, together with a certain revival of the cantes de ida y vuelta and a reappreciation of the ópera flamenca period, his figure came back into favour for a significant part of the critics, artists and flamenco public. His influence was claimed by several outstanding singers, including Enrique Morente, Mayte Martín or Arcángel. A clear example is Álvarez Caballero himself who, only two years after writing the words quoted above, directed a partial compilation of his recordings (Un monumento al cante, Quejío collection, EMI, 1997), with an introductory leaflet in which he stated:

A singer of delicate ornaments, in the styles from Málaga and Eastern Andalusia he excelled especially with a convincing expressive quality. He was also an extraordinary interpreter of fandangos.[...] Pepe Marchena cannot be ranked together with his imitators. Marchena had a great personality, an extraordinary musical talent.[...] After his death, Marchena's popularity suffered diverse changes. His unconditional admirers kept affirming their adoration for him but, in general, the critical tendency gathered momentum. Later, however, marchenismo gradually gained prestige, and nowadays we have the impression that flamencologist and serious flamenco lovers increasingly value his work.

Manuel Barrios perfectly summarized in one sentence the controversial character of Marchena's work: "For some, Pepe de Marchena is the first lie in flamenco singing; for others, its ultimate truth."

== Partial discography ==
As usual with flamenco works recorded before the decade of the sixties, Marchena's original recordings are regularly republished in different compilations. No reordered and complete republishing of his records has been made of his work. The list below is not complete and contains compilations published in the decades of the nineties and after the year 2000.

Pepe Marchena. Arte flamenco vol. 15. Las flores de la decadencia, Mandala, 1990

Pepe Marchena. Cantaores de época. Vol. 1, Fods, 1995 Comments and audio samples in Flamenco-world.com

El Niño de Marchena: primeras grabaciones. 1924–1934, Nuevos Medios, 1996. Early recordings.

Un monumento al cante, Quejío collection, EMI, 1997. Compilation of songs.

Grandes Figuras del Flamenco (Vol. 10). Pepe Marchena. Comments and audio samples in Flamenco-world.com.

Pepe Marchena. Flamenco viejo. El flamenco como suena. Recordings since 1950.

Niño de Marchena acompañado por Ramón Montoya y Orquesta. Flamenco Histórico. Vol. 10, dial, 1998

Pepe Marchena. Éxitos, Fonotrón, 1999

Niño de Marchena. Antología – La Epoca Dorada del Flamenco, Vol. 1, Tecnodisco, 2001

Pepe Marchena. Grabaciones discos pizarra. Año 1930, 2002 Comments and audio samples in Flamenco-world.com

Así era Pepe Marchena, 2003. Includes audio CD and a 72-page booklet. More information in Elflamencovive.es

Niño de Marchena. Antología – La Epoca Dorada del Flamenco, Vol. 22, Tecnodisco, 2003

Pepe Marchena. La voz de los pueblos, 2003. Special Edition for the 100th anniversary of Marchena's birth (1903–2003).

Pepe Marchena. 50 años de Flamenco. 1940–1990 (1ª época), Divucsa, 2003

Cantaores de época. Pepe Marchena. Vol 6, 2004. Audio samples in Esflamenco.com

Niño de Marchena. Antología – La Epoca Dorada del Flamenco, Vol. 36, Dienc, 2005

Flamenco y Universidad. Vol 1, 2006. Contains lecture offered on February 28, 1972 by Pepe Marchena at the University of Seville', together with songs in diverse flamenco styles.

== Sources ==
Álvarez Caballero, Ángel: La discografía ideal del flamenco, Planeta, Barcelona, 1995 ISBN 978-84-08-01602-1

Álvarez Caballero, Ángel: Introductory leaflet to Un monumento al cante, Quejío collection, EMI, 1997

Álvarez Caballero, Ángel: El cante flamenco, Quejío collection, EMI, 1997 (pages 223–244) ISBN 978-84-206-9682-9

D'Averc, Alexandre. "Pepe Marchena. Prophet and heretic". flamenco-world.com. Archived from the original on November 25, 2006. (In English)

El Niño de la Albarizuela. "Pepe Marchena. Datos extraidos del Diccionario Flamenco de Jose Blas Vega y Manuel Rios Ruiz Cinterco – 1985". Artistas flamencos. tristeyazul.com. Archived from the original on July 28, 2006.

Ortega, Antonio. "El cáncer del separatismo". flamenco-news.com.

Ríos Ruiz, Manuel: El gran libro del flamenco, Vol II: interpreters, Calambur, Madrid, 2002 ISBN 978-84-88015-95-2

Rodó Sellés, Ramón. "La figura de Pepe Marchena vista desde el siglo XXI" (PDF). deflamenco.com.
