= Maka (singer) =

Spanish flamenco singer

- Born: Francisco Javier Rodríguez Morales; December 10, 1985 (age 40); Granada, Spain
- Genres: flamenco; Spanish hip hop; urbano
- Occupation: Singer
- Instruments: Vocals; guitar
- Years active: 2014–present

Francisco Javier Rodríguez Morales (born December 10, 1985), better known by his stage name Maka is a Spanish singer and songwriter. His music style is a fusion of flamenco, Spanish hip hop and reggaeton. The music video to his song "El Arte de Vivir" (literally, "The Art of living") has been viewed over 65 million times on YouTube.

== Discography ==
- Aura (2025)
- Gloria Bendita (2023)
- Detrás De Esta Pinta Hay Un Flamenco (2021)
- Maldiciones (2020)
- Bendiciones (2020)
- Dvende (2018)
- Alma (2016)
- Raíces (2016)
- Pvreza (2015)
- Makanudo (2015)
- Pna (2014)
- Quién
