= Cantes de ida y vuelta =

Cantes de ida y vuelta (Spanish pronunciation: [ˈkantes ðe ˈiðaj ˈβwelta]) is a Spanish expression literally meaning roundtrip songs. It refers to a group of flamenco musical forms or palos with diverse musical features, which "travelled back" from Latin America (mainly Cuba) as styles that, having originated in the interplay between musical traditions of peninsular Spain and those of Latin America, developed into renewed forms that were reintroduced in Spain. Usually they have a more mellow character than the more traditional flamenco songs.

== History ==
In the Spanish Golden Age, dramatists like Lope de Vega and Tirso de Molina already included songs and dances of Latin American influence. There is also evidence of their popularity in the 19th century: many examples still remain of printed songbooks and sheets, often mixing Andalusian and Latin American songs, which were sold in the streets, and Baron Charles Davillier, in his trip in Spain in 1862 described a fiesta (party) in these terms:

[…] and a young Gypsy […] danced the American tango with an extraordinary grace. Another widely known music in Andalusia is the Punto de la Habana, whose name indicates its origin, and it is used to accompany the décimas sung between dances in parties.

The exchange of musical influences was particularly important at the end of the Spanish–American War in 1898, when the United States gained control over Cuba, the last Spanish territory in Latin America. The defeat involved the return of many Spanish emigrants to Spain. These returned migrants, popularly called indianos, also brought back their songs and their music, which were soon included in the repertoire of flamenco artists, after a process of adaptation to the flamenco style of singing and playing. Although Antonio Chacón already sang these styles (he recorded the milonga in 1913), the first flamenco singer who recorded a significant repertoire of guajiras, milongas, and vidalitas was Manuel Escacena. He made popular the milonga "Juan Simón", which he learned from Mexican bullfighters around 1911, and which was later recorded by several other singers.

== Palos classified as cantes de ida y vuelta ==
The palos included in this category have different musical characteristics, so the category of ida y vuelta is just a common denomination based on their origin. The palos normally included in this category are the following:

- Guajiras. Sometimes called also punto cubano. Probably it was the first song of the ida y vuelta type to be incorporated into flamenco, in the second half of the 19th century, but its golden age, as with most of the songs of this group, was the period known as ópera flamenca (1922–1956). The lyrics are composed in stanzas called décimas, consisting of 10 octosyllabic lines rhyming ABBAACCDDC. It has a 12-beat rhythmic pattern like the Peteneras, that is, a combination of 6/8 and 3/4 metres, ([1] [2] [3] [4] [5] [6] [7] [8] [9] [10] [11] [12]).
- Colombianas. This style was created by singer Pepe Marchena in 1931 and soon became very popular. Most singers of the ópera flamenca time recorded it. While their melody resembles the Guajiras, their rhythm is 4/4. The stanza has six octosyllabic verses.
- Milonga. It is based on Argentinian folklore, with 4/4 time signature and stanzas in four octosyllabic lines. Singer Pepa Oro learnt it while travelling in America and adapted it to flamenco style, making it popular in Spain.
- Vidalita. Originated in the folklore of northern Argentina. Its stanza is made of four octosyllabic lines. It is perhaps the less frequently recorded style in this group. The best remembered recordings from the ópera flamenca period are those by Pepe Marchena and Juan Valderrama, but after that period, with the deprecation of non-Gypsy styles by the singers of the generation of Antonio Mairena, it was practically forgotten. Recently, after Mayte Martín's recording of Valderrama's version, it enjoyed new popularity and it has even been recorded by Gypsy singer Diego El Cigala.
- Rumbas. This style of Afro-Cuban origin has a lively 4/4 rhythm still very reminiscent of its Cuban origin. The style had been more or less marginal in the flamenco artists' repertoires, although it was recorded by some singers like La Niña de los Peines or Manuel Vallejo, among others. However, it reached enormous popularity after the decades of the 60s and 70s, when it was adopted by Catalan gypsies like Antonio González El Pescaílla and Peret. Since then, it has become the regular "hit track" in the recordings of many singers and guitarists, including specialists like Bambino or Maruja Garrido, Gypsy groups like Los Chunguitos, Los Amaya, and practically all modern flamenco guitarists like Paco de Lucía, Tomatito or Vicente Amigo. It is rarely sung by more traditional flamenco singers (with great exceptions like Chano Lobato, an excellent performer of all rhythmic styles), and flamencologists have tended to regard this genre as "not flamenco".

The melodies of guajiras, colombianas and milongas have also frequently been adapted to the rhythms of other palos like bulerías or tangos.

== Other styles of possible Latin American influence ==
Although not normally classified under the category of the cantes de ida y vuelta, some critics consider flamenco tangos to be of Afro-Cuban origin. However, the question of the origins of tangos is much debated. Molina and Mairena considered it a basic flamenco song and therefore Gypsy. Guitarist Manuel Cano found Indian, Arabian and American influences in it. However, the rhythms of tangos can be found in many parts of the world.

== Discography ==
Various artists: Los cantes hispanoamericanos en el mundo del flamenco, Pasarela, 2001 Various artists, (compiled by BLAS VEGA, José): Magna Antología del cante, Hispavox, CD Edition, Vol X, 1992
