= Flamenco zapateado notation =

Flamenco zapateado notation or Flamenco zapateado (foot-stomping) notation is a type of dance notation. It is the graphic representation of the sonorous and motor aspects of the particular movements of flamenco dancing that are produced by the action of zapateado or foot-stomping.

== History ==
There are different forms of dance notation. They are mainly based on movement and body positions. Zapateado is an element of some dances, and it has its own notation system. In flamenco dancing the notations for zapateado include the one created by Teresa Martínez de la Peña, who was one of the first authors to include symbols for the notation of flamenco zapateado. In his book Método pedagógico de interacción música/danza, Pedro Alarcón also provided symbols for the notation of flamenco zapateado. Subsequently, in Figuras, pasos y mudanzas the authors Eulalia Pablo and Jose Luís Navarro proposed their own notation symbols. Rosa de las Heras proposes a notation system for flamenco zapateado in several audiovisual publications with scores (books, CD and DVD).

== Notation symbols ==
In general, the notation of flamenco zapateado always uses five symbols for feet movements. Depending on the author, the name may vary, but it generally coincides with the movement. Some include additional symbols for the most specific movements.

Martínez de la Peña’s notation system comprises 5 basic symbols called tip, heel, ball, toe and scrape heel to represent the different forms in which the foot hits the floor. She adds the indications for right and left and numbers to indicate the flamenco tempos.

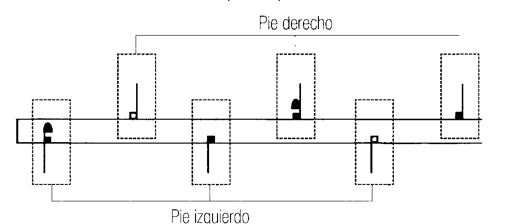
Flamenco zapateado notation symbols for right foot and left foot. Flamenco zapateado notation proposed by Rosa De las Heras.

Alarcon’s notation system includes three lines of percussion for three mechanisms of the foot: the top line, called “P” indicates the movement that he calls tip [punta in Spanish]; the “T” line is to indicate the movement he calls heel [tacón in Spanish]; and the bottom line is “PL” to indicate the movement called ball [planta in Spanish]. Letters and numbers are added to this three-line score to indicate the other movements. In addition, the system includes explanations for the right and left feet. The rhythm is indicated by means of traditional Western musical notation.

Pablo and Navarro’s notation proposes 5 basic symbols somewhat similar to the ones used by Martínez de la Peña, although they add the word "stomp" to the names. Their system comprises additional symbols, including one for non-sonorous positions.

De las Heras’s notation includes symbols of the foot as note heads. She uses 5 basic symbols called ball, half ball, tip, block heel and edge heel. She works with two lines of percussion: the right foot on the top percussion line and the left foot on the lower line. The rhythm is based on the traditional Western musical notation system, similar to percussion notation.

== See also ==
- Flamenco dancing
- Percussion notation
- Tap dancing
