= Rafael Orozco (pianist) =

Spanish musician

Rafael Orozco Flores (24 January 1946 – 24 April 1996) was a Spanish classical pianist. Orozco is acclaimed as one of the great Spanish concert pianists.

Rafael Orozco came from a musical family in Córdoba and studied with José Cubiles, Alexis Weissenberg and Maria Curcio, the last and favourite pupil of Artur Schnabel. His professional career began after he won first prize in the 1966 Leeds International Piano Competition in the UK.

His large repertoire included works by Frédéric Chopin, Franz Liszt, Franz Schubert, Manuel de Falla, Sergei Rachmaninoff and Isaac Albéniz. He gave recitals on five continents and participated as soloist with the world's great orchestras, including Cleveland, Chicago, New York, Philadelphia, Los Angeles, Berlin, Vienna, Paris, and London. Orozco also participated in music festivals at Osaka, Praga, Berlin, Santander, Edinburgh, Spoleto, and Aldeburgh.

Orozco's playing was used in Ken Russell's 1970 film The Music Lovers, based on the life of Pyotr Ilyich Tchaikovsky.

In 1986, Córdoba awarded Orozco the Gold Medal of the city and the title of Hijo Predilecto (Favourite Son).

Orozco died of AIDS in 1996. The Conservatorio Superior de Música Rafael Orozco de Córdoba is named in his honour.
