= El Lebrijano =

Spanish Romani flamenco musician (1941–2016)

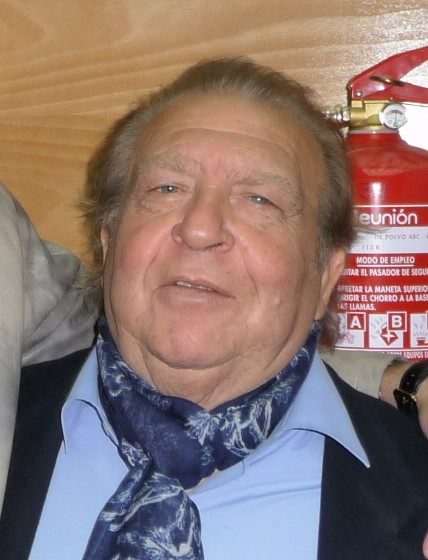
Juan Peña in February 2010

Juan Peña Fernández (8 August 1941 – 13 July 2016), also known as Juan Peña "El Lebrijano" or simply El Lebrijano, was a Spanish Gitano (Roma) flamenco musician. As a flamenco-fusion musician he studied the musical relation and fusion of two cultures that coexisted in Spain during the Al-Andalus period.

== Biography ==
Born in Lebrija, province of Seville, in the context of a family where several members sing flamenco: Fernanda y Bernarda de Utrera, and his mother La Perrata.

He began to play flamenco guitar as a child, accompanying singers such as La Paquera de Jerez in 1950, but eventually turned to Flamenco singing. In 1964, he won the championship at the Competition of Mairena del Alcor, one of the most important Flamenco music festivals. Within years, he was regarded as one of the greatest voices of flamenco. A few years later, in 1970, he started his collaboration with the guitarist Paco de Lucía.

His later musical works included Andalusi influences, with albums such as Casablanca, Open Doors and Encuentros. There was also a tribute to his friend Gabriel García Márquez.

In 1997 the Spanish Ministry of Culture awarded him the Medalla de Oro al Trabajo.

Peña died at his home in Seville, Spain on 13 July 2016, aged 75.
