= Peteneras =

Style of flamenco

The Petenera is a flamenco palo in a 12-beat metre, with strong beats distributed as follows: [12][1][2][3][4][5][6][7][8][9][10][11]. It is therefore identical with the 16th century Spanish dances zarabanda and the jácara.

The lyrics are in 4-line stanzas.

It is believed to be a very old style of song, as it was already mentioned by writer Serafín Estébanez Calderón in the mid 19th century, and the adherence to the rhythm of the old zarabanda seems to confirm its age. Several theories have been suggested as to its origin, although there is not enough evidence to sustain any of them unerringly:

- Theory of Paterna. This popular theory sustains that this palo originated in the town of Paterna de Rivera in the Province of Cádiz. According to a legend, the name of the song refers to a cantaora (woman singer) called "La Petenera", who was born there. She was reported to be, owing to her seduction power, the "damnation of men". The name "Petenera" would be a phonetic corruption of "Paternera" (born in Paterna). This theory was sustained by folklorist Demófilo.
- Theory of the Jewish origin. According to this theory, suggested by flamencologist Hipólito Rossy, the petenera originated in the songs of Sephardi Jews. He even assured that Sephardi Jews in the Balkans still sang the lyrics that contain the verse of the Petenera as the "damnation of men"
- Some modern theories situate the origin of the Petenera in Petén, a department (administrative region) of Guatemala.

== Sources ==
- ÁLVAREZ CABALLERO, Ángel: La discoteca ideal del flamenco, Planeta, 1995
- CASTAÑO, José María: "Conferencia sobre la Serranía de Cádiz y sus cantes", Circuito "Caminos del Flamenco" de la Diputación de Cádiz, Peña Flamenca de Grazalema, 26 de mayo de 2001.
- MARTÍN SALAZAR, Jorge: Los cantes flamencos, Diputación Provincial de Granada
- ROSSY, Hipólito: Teoría del cante jondo, CREDSA, second edition, 1998 (first edition 1966)
