= Flamencology =

Flamencology, from the Spanish word Flamencología, is an academic discipline pertaining to the Flamenco arts. It combines research, documentation, and other techniques to achieve the diffusion and preservation of the art.

== Etymology ==
The term was coined in 1955 by Spanish Argentine author Anselmo González Clement in a publication of the same year utilizing the term as its title. The Real Academia Española included the term in a revision of the Spanish dictionary through the efforts of the Granadine writer Luis Rosales. The term was diffused as early as 1958 by a group of erudites known as the Cátedra de Jerez in Jerez de la Frontera, Spain.

== Institutionalization ==
The Discipline is institutionalized throughout the Andalucía region in southern Spain. Institutions such as the Universidad de Sevilla (University of Seville) and the Universidad de Córdoba (Córdoba University) offer specialization in this discipline.

== In Modern Practice ==
The discipline is put into practice through various publications or lectures. Some examples of publications are Revista Alma 100, Revista El Olivo, and Flamenco World.com.

== Propagation ==
The extent to which the discipline is practiced varies on the growth of general knowledge of the Flamenco arts. Since the beginning, it has been the purpose of Flamencologists to diffuse the art both locally and abroad, and with the diffusion of the art later come the methods of documenting and researching the art thus putting Flamencology into practice.

In practice, people are first exposed to Flamenco as an art be it music or dance. This can be either inherited through family ties or acquired by an aficionado. As in other disciplines, first comes the practice then comes the analysis, methods, techniques, and theory related to an "ology".

The e has become more formal and taken root outside of Spain, wherever the art is cultivated to the point that documentation can be performed on relevant topics related to respective regions. Countries such as Argentina, Chile, Costa Rica, and Mexico have reached this point with Chilean writers contributing to Flamenco publications in Spain and Chile and in Mexico with the creation of the Instituto Mexicano de Flamencología. In 2005 Argentina, held its first "Jornada de Flamencología" with a number of lectures.

== Bibliography ==
- Esteban, José María. 2007, Breve enciclopedia del flamenco, Madrid: Libsa.
- Mederos, Alicia. 1996, El flamenco, Madrid: Acento Editorial.
