= Fosforito =

Spanish flamenco singer (1932–2025)

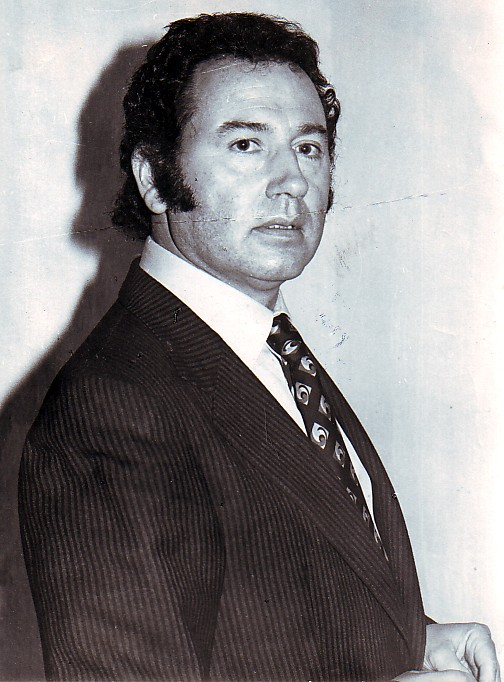

Antonio Fernández Díaz (3 August 1932 – 13 November 2025), known as Fosforito, was a Spanish flamenco singer and winner of the fifth Golden Key of flamenco singing. Only five of these have been awarded since the award's inception in 1862. Its previous winners were Tomás "El Nitri", Manuel Vallejo, Antonio Mairena, and Camarón de la Isla (posthumous). Fosforito was born in Puente Genil, Córdoba Province, Spain on 3 August 1932, and died on 13 November 2025, at the age of 93.

== Partial discography ==
- Arte flamenco Vol.1 (Universo flamenco) (2005)
- Selección antológica Vol. 1 (Universo flamenco) (2005)
- Selección antológica Vol. 2 (Universo flamenco) (2005)
- Selección antológica Vol. 3 (Universo flamenco) (2005)
- Antonio Fernández "Fosforito" (2004)
- 50 años de flamenco (2ª época) (2003)
- Selección antológica Vol. 1 (2003)
- Selección antológica Vol. 2 (2003)
- Selección antológica Vol. 3 (2003)
- Misa flamenca en Córdoba (2003)
- Cristal suelto (2002)
- Selección antológica del cante flamenco (2002)
- Cante y guitarra (with Paco de Lucía) (1999)
- Misa flamenca (1994)
- Grabaciones históricas. Vol. 34. Córdoba 1956

== Awards ==
- Premio Nacional de Cante (National Award to Flamenco Singing, 1968) from Cátedra de Flamencología of Jerez
- "Mercedes la Serneta" award (1977)
- II Compás de Cante (1985)
- Pastora Pavón "Niña de los peines" Award (1999) from the Andalusian autonomous government
- Favourite y Gold Medal of Puente Genil
- Premio Ondas
- V Gold Key of Flamenco Singing (2005)
- Gold Medal of Merit in the Fine Arts (2007)
- Premio Leyenda del Flamenco (Legend of Flamenco Prize) (2013)
