= Flamenco =

Genre of Spanish music and dance

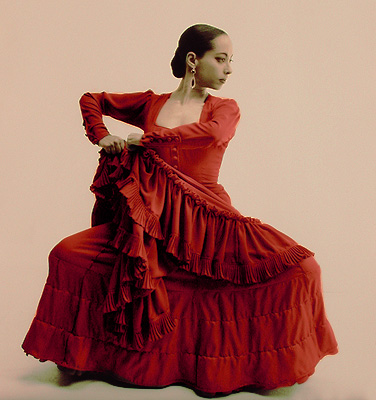
- Belén Maya, a flamenco dancer of the gitano ethnicity in traditional dress
- Stylistic origins: Andalusi nubah and Romani traditional music
- Cultural origins: Calé Roma, Andalusian people, late 18th century, Spain
- Typical instruments: Vocals; clapping; guitar; castanets; cajón flamenco

Subgenres
- Alegrías; bulerías; fandango; malagueñas; rumba flamenca; sevillanas; siguiriyas; soleá; tango; tientos; verdiales

Fusion genres
- Flamenco rock; new flamenco

Other topics
- Music of Spain; music of Andalusia; cante flamenco; cante jondo; falsetas

Flamenco
- UNESCO Intangible Cultural Heritage
- Country: Spain
- Reference: 00363
- Region: Europe and North America

Inscription history
- Inscription: 2010 (5th session)
- List: Representative

Flamenco (Spanish pronunciation: [flaˈmeŋko]) is an art form based on the various folkloric music traditions of southern Spain, developed within the gitano subculture of the Andalusian region, and also having historical presence in Extremadura and Murcia. In a wider sense, the term is used to refer to a variety of both contemporary and traditional musical styles typical of southern Spain. Flamenco is closely associated with the gitanos of the Romani ethnicity, who have contributed significantly to its origin and professionalization. However, its style is uniquely Andalusian, and flamenco artists have historically included Spaniards of both gitano and non-gitano heritage.

Although it is often described as a folk, popular or oral tradition, flamenco is also regarded as a complex and sophisticated musical system. Its forms combine song, guitar, dance, compás, modal and tonal harmony, falsetas, handclaps, footwork, melodic ornamentation and improvisatory variation. The musical identity of a palo may depend on several features at once, including rhythmic cycle, mode, chord progression, stanzaic form, geographic origin and performance convention. This musical sophistication, together with the development of concert flamenco guitar and formal conservatory study, has helped flamenco appeal not only to popular audiences but also to listeners and performers from classical-music backgrounds.

The oldest record of flamenco music dates to 1774 in the book Las Cartas Marruecas (The Moroccan Letters) by José Cadalso. The development of flamenco over the past two centuries is well documented: "the theatre movement of sainetes (one-act plays) and tonadillas, popular song books and song sheets, customs, studies of dances, and toques, perfection, newspapers, graphic documents in paintings and engravings. ... in continuous evolution together with rhythm, the poetic stanzas, and the ambiance."

On 16 November 2010, UNESCO declared flamenco one of the Masterpieces of the Oral and Intangible Heritage of Humanity.

== Etymology ==
Historically, the term flamenco was used to identify the Romani people (gitanos) of Spain. The English traveller George Borrow who travelled through Spain during the 1830s stated that the gitanos were also called Flemish (in Spanish, 'flamenco') due to German and Flemish being erroneously considered synonymous. According to flamencologist Cristina Cruces-Roldán, a year prior to Borrow's account, there already existed a gitano party in Madrid that was clearly identified as flamenco. This equivalency between gitano and flamenco is also noted by Manuel Fernández y González, Demófilo, and the scholar Irving Brown who stated in 1938 that "flamenco is simply another term for gitano, with special connotations."

The origins of the term lie in the sociological prejudice towards the Roma who were seen as ruffians and cocky troublemakers by the Spaniards and were thus associated with the 18th-century German colonists of the Sierra Morena who formed groups of urban Bohemians that lived outside the law and were seen as idle and lazy. Other less successful hypotheses include those of Felipe Pedrell and Carlos Alemendros who state that while the term flamenco is Spanish for Flemish, it is actually synonymous with cantador (professional singer) in reference to the group of Flemish singers brought by Spanish King Carlos I in 1516. Another hypothesis that is not widely accepted is the Arabist theory of Blas Infante, which in his book Orígenes de lo flamenco (Origins of flamenco) presents flamenco as a phonetic deformation of Arabic fellah-mengu (runaway laborer) or was derived from the Arabic terms Felah-Mengus, which together mean "wandering peasant".

The first use of the term flamenco to refer to the music genre appears in a 1847 newspaper article of El Espectador where it was referred to as a "gitano genre". In the early years of flamenco, the term was versatile and was used to refer to a variety of concepts in the gitano-Andalusian world. For example, in the 1860s-70s this versatility was exemplified through its use to refer to a musical style and a certain aesthetic, manners, and way of life that were perceived to be gitano. At that time, flamenco was not a strict genre but a way of performing music in a gitano-Andalusian style.

== History ==
=== Cultural origins ===
There are hypotheses that point to the influence on flamenco of types of dance from the Indian subcontinent; the place of origin of the Romani people. The North Indian scales of flamenco were introduced to Andalusia by the Romani migrations from Northern India. These Roma migrants also brought bells, and an extensive repertoire of songs and dances. Upon arrival to Andalusia in the 15th century, they were exposed to the rich Arab-Andalusian music culture, itself a hybrid of Spanish music tradition going back to the 8th century with the establishment of Al-Andalus, which brought in traditions and music from the Arabian Peninsula, Northern Africa and Sephardic features. Some of the instruments associated with flamenco and Spanish folklore in different regions today, are the wooden castanets and tambourines, both believed to originate during the Al Andalus period. This centuries-long period of cultural intermingling, formed the roots of flamenco song and dance genres.

It is believed that the flamenco genre emerged at the end of the 18th century in cities and agrarian towns of Baja Andalusia, highlighting Jerez de la Frontera as the first written vestige of this art, although there is practically no data related to those dates and the manifestations of this time are more typical of the bolero school than of flamenco. It appeared as a modern art form from the convergence of the urban subaltern groups, gitano communities, and journeyman of Andalusia that formed the marginalized flamenco artistic working class who established flamenco as a singular art form, marked from the beginning by the gitano brand. Andalusia was the origin and cradle of the early flamenco cantaores and of the three or four dozen gitano families who created and cultivated flamenco.

=== Casticismo ===
During the end of the 18th and beginning of the 19th century, a number of factors led to the rise in Spain of a phenomenon known as "Costumbrismo Andaluz" or "Andalusian Mannerism".

In 1783 Carlos III promulgated a pragmatics that regulated the social situation of the gitanos. This was a momentous event in the history of Spanish gitanos who, after centuries of marginalization and persecution, saw their legal situation improve substantially.

After the Spanish War of Independence (1808–1812), a feeling of racial pride developed in the Spanish conscience, in opposition to the "gallified" afrancesados - Spaniards who were influenced by French culture and the idea of the enlightenment. In this context, gitanos were seen as an ideal embodiment of Spanish culture and the emergence of the bullfighting schools of Ronda and Seville, the rise of the Bandidos and Vaqueros led to a taste for Andalusian romantic culture which triumphed in the Madrid court.

At this time there is evidence of disagreements due to the introduction of innovations in art.

=== The cantante cafés ===
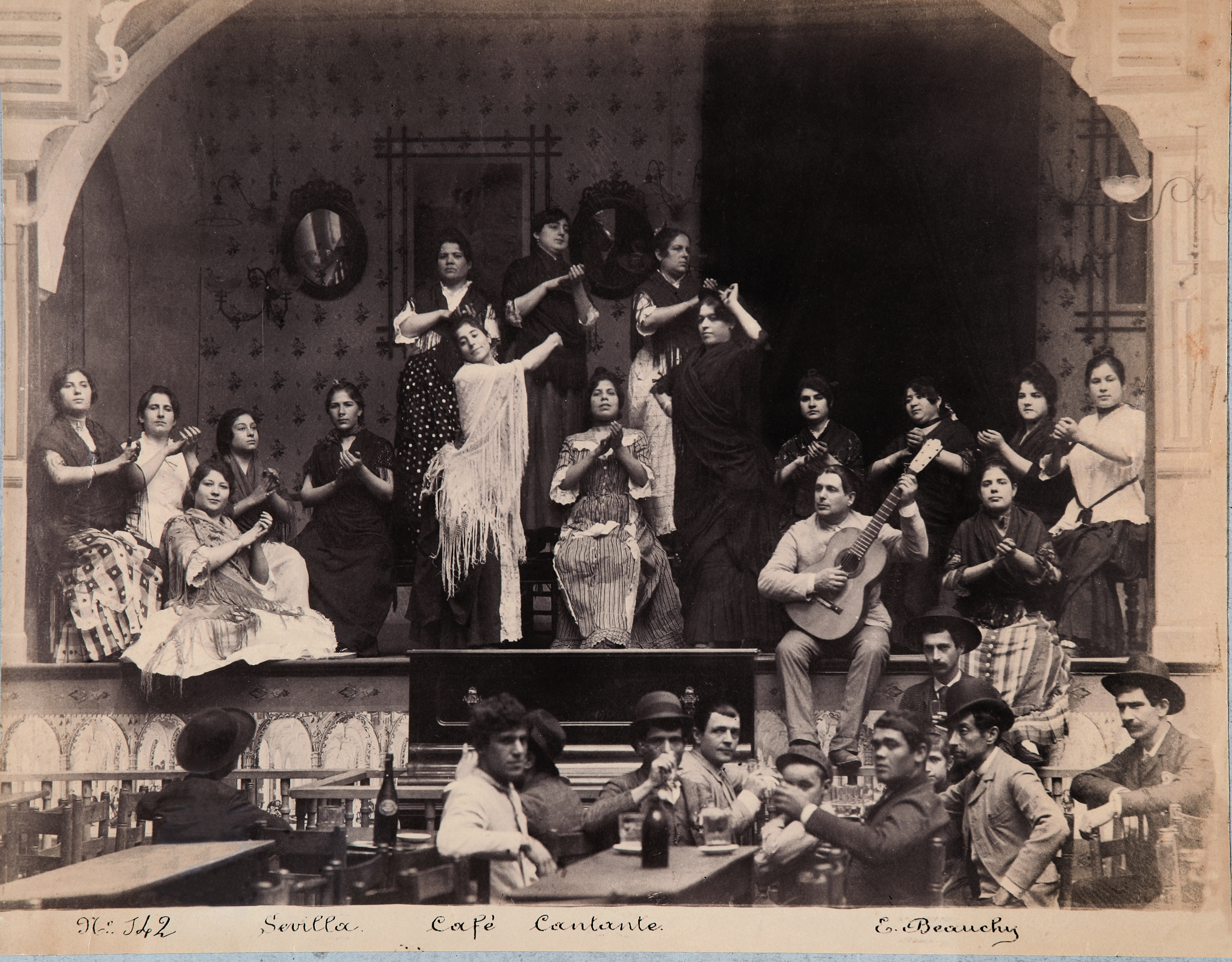
"Café cantante" in Seville, Spain, c.1888. Photograph by Emilio Beauchy aka "E. Beauchy"

In 1881 Silverio Franconetti opened the first flamenco singer café in Seville. In Silverio's café the cantaores were in a very competitive environment, which allowed the emergence of the professional cantaor and served as a crucible where flamenco art was configured. Locals learned the cantes, while reinterpreting the Andalusian folk songs in their own style, expanding the repertoire. Likewise, the taste of the public contributed to configure the flamenco genre, unifying its technique and its theme.

=== Antiflamencoism in the "Generation of '98" ===
Flamenquismo, defined by the Royal Spanish Academy as a "fondness for flamenco art and customs", is a conceptual catch-all where flamenco singing and a fondness for bullfighting, among other traditional Spanish elements, fit. These customs were strongly attacked by the generation of 98, all of its members being "anti-flamenco", with the exception of the Machado brothers, Manuel and Antonio. Being Sevillians and sons of the folklorist Demófilo Machado, the brothers had a more complex view of the matter. The greatest standard bearer of anti-flamenquism was the Madrid writer Eugenio Noel, who, in his youth, had been a militant casticista. Noel attributed to flamenco and bullfighting the origin of the ills of Spain which he saw as manifestations of the country's Oriental character which hindered economic and social development. These considerations caused an insurmountable rift to be established for decades between flamenco and most "intellectuals" of the time.

=== Flamenco colors ===
The traditional colors associated with flamenco are red, white and gold.

=== Flamenca opera ===
Between 1920 and 1955, flamenco shows began to be held in bullrings and theaters, under the name "flamenco opera". This denomination was an economic strategy of the promoters, since opera only paid 3% while variety shows paid 10%. At this time, flamenco shows spread throughout Spain and the main cities of the world. The great social and commercial success achieved by flamenco at this time eliminated some of the oldest and most sober styles from the stage, in favor of lighter airs, such as cantiñas, los cantes de ida y vuelta and fandangos, of which many personal versions were created. The purist critics attacked this lightness of the cantes, as well as the use of falsete and the gaitero style.

In the line of purism, the poet Federico García Lorca and the composer Manuel de Falla had the idea of concurso de cante jondo in Granada in 1922. Both artists conceived of flamenco as folklore, not as a scenic artistic genre; for this reason, they were concerned, since they believed that the massive triumph of flamenco would end its purest and deepest roots. To remedy this, they organized a cante jondo contest in which only amateurs could participate and in which festive cantes (such as cantiñas) were excluded, which Falla and Lorca did not consider jondos, but flamencos. The jury was chaired by Antonio Chacón, who at that time was the leading figure in cante. The winners were "El Tenazas", a retired professional cantaor from Morón de la Frontera, and Manuel Ortega, an eight-year-old boy from Seville who would go down in flamenco history as Manolo Caracol. The contest turned out to be a failure due to the scant echo it had and because Lorca and Falla did not know how to understand the professional character that flamenco already had at that time, striving in vain to seek a purity that never existed in an art that was characterized by mixture and the personal innovation of its creators. Apart from this failure, with the Generation of '27, whose most eminent members were Andalusians and therefore knew the genre first-hand, the recognition of flamenco by intellectuals began.

At that time, there were already flamenco recordings related to Christmas, which can be divided into two groups: the traditional flamenco carol and flamenco songs that adapt their lyrics to the Christmas theme. These cantes have been maintained to this day, the Zambomba Jerezana being spatially representative, declared an Asset of Intangible Cultural Interest by the Junta de Andalucía in December 2015.

During the Spanish Civil War, a large number of singers were exiled or died defending the Republic and the humiliations to which they were being subjected by the National Party: Bando Nacional: Corruco de Algeciras, Chaconcito, El Carbonerillo, El Chato De Las Ventas, Vallejito, Rita la Cantaora, Angelillo, Guerrita are some of them. In the postwar period and the first years of the Franco regime, the world of flamenco was viewed with suspicion, as the authorities were not clear that this genre contributed to the national conscience. However, the regime soon ended up adopting flamenco as one of the quintessential Spanish cultural manifestations. The singers who have survived the war go from stars to almost outcasts, singing for the young men in the private rooms of the brothels in the center of Seville where they have to adapt to the whims of aristocrats, soldiers and businessmen who have become rich.

In short, the period of the flamenco opera was open to creativity and comprised most of the flamenco repertoire. It was the Golden Age of this genre, with figures such as Antonio Chacón, Manuel Vallejo, Manuel Torre, La Niña de los Peines, Pepe Marchena and Manolo Caracol.

=== Academic study ===
Starting in the 1950s, abundant anthropological and musicological studies on flamenco began to be published. In 1954 Hispavox published the first Antología del Cante Flamenco, a sound recording that was a great shock to its time, dominated by orchestrated cante and, consequently, mystified. In 1955, the Argentine intellectual Anselmo González Climent published an essay called Flamencología, whose title he baptized the "set of knowledge, techniques, etc., on flamenco singing and dancing." This book dignified the study of flamenco by applying the academic methodology of musicology to it and served as the basis for subsequent studies on this genre.

As a result, in 1956 the National Contest of Cante Jondo de Córdoba was organized and in 1958 the first flamencology chair was founded in Jerez de la Frontera, the oldest academic institution dedicated to the study, research, conservation, promotion and defense of the flamenco art. Likewise, in 1963 the Cordovan poet Ricardo Molina and the Sevillian cantaor Antonio Mairena published Alalimón Mundo y Formas del Cante flamenco, which has become a must-have reference work.

For a long time the Mairenistas postulates were considered practically unquestionable, until they found an answer in other authors who elaborated the "Andalusian thesis", which defended that flamenco was a genuinely Andalusian product, since it had been developed entirely in this region and because its styles basic ones derived from the folklore of Andalusia. They also maintained that the Andalusian gitanos had contributed decisively to their formation, highlighting the exceptional nature of flamenco among gypsy music and dances from other parts of Spain and Europe. The unification of the gitanos and Andalusian thesis has ended up being the most accepted today. In short, between the 1950s and 1970s, flamenco went from being a mere show to also becoming an object of study.

=== Flamenco protest during the Franco regime ===
Flamenco became one of the symbols of Spanish national identity during the Franco regime, since the regime knew how to appropriate a folklore traditionally associated with Andalusia to promote national unity and attract tourism, constituting what was called national-flamenquismo. Hence, flamenco had long been seen as a reactionary or retrograde element. In the mid-60s and until the transition, cantadores who opposed the regime began to appear with the use of protest lyrics. These include: José Menese and lyricist Francisco Moreno Galván, Enrique Morente, Manuel Gerena, El Lebrijano, El Cabrero, Lole y Manuel, el Piki or Luis Marín, among many others.

In contrast to this conservatism with which it was associated during the Franco regime, flamenco suffered the influence of the wave of activism that also shook the university against the repression of the regime when university students came into contact with this art in the recitals that were held, for example, at the Colegio Mayor de San Juan Evangelista: "flamenco amateurs and professionals got involved with performances of a manifestly political nature. It was a kind of flamenco protest charged with protest, which meant censorship and repression for the flamenco activists".

As the political transition progressed, the demands were deflated as flamenco inserted itself within the flows of globalized art. At the same time, this art was institutionalized until it reached the point that the Junta de Andalucía was attributed in 2007 "exclusive competence in matters of knowledge, conservation, research, training, promotion and dissemination".

=== Flamenco fusion ===
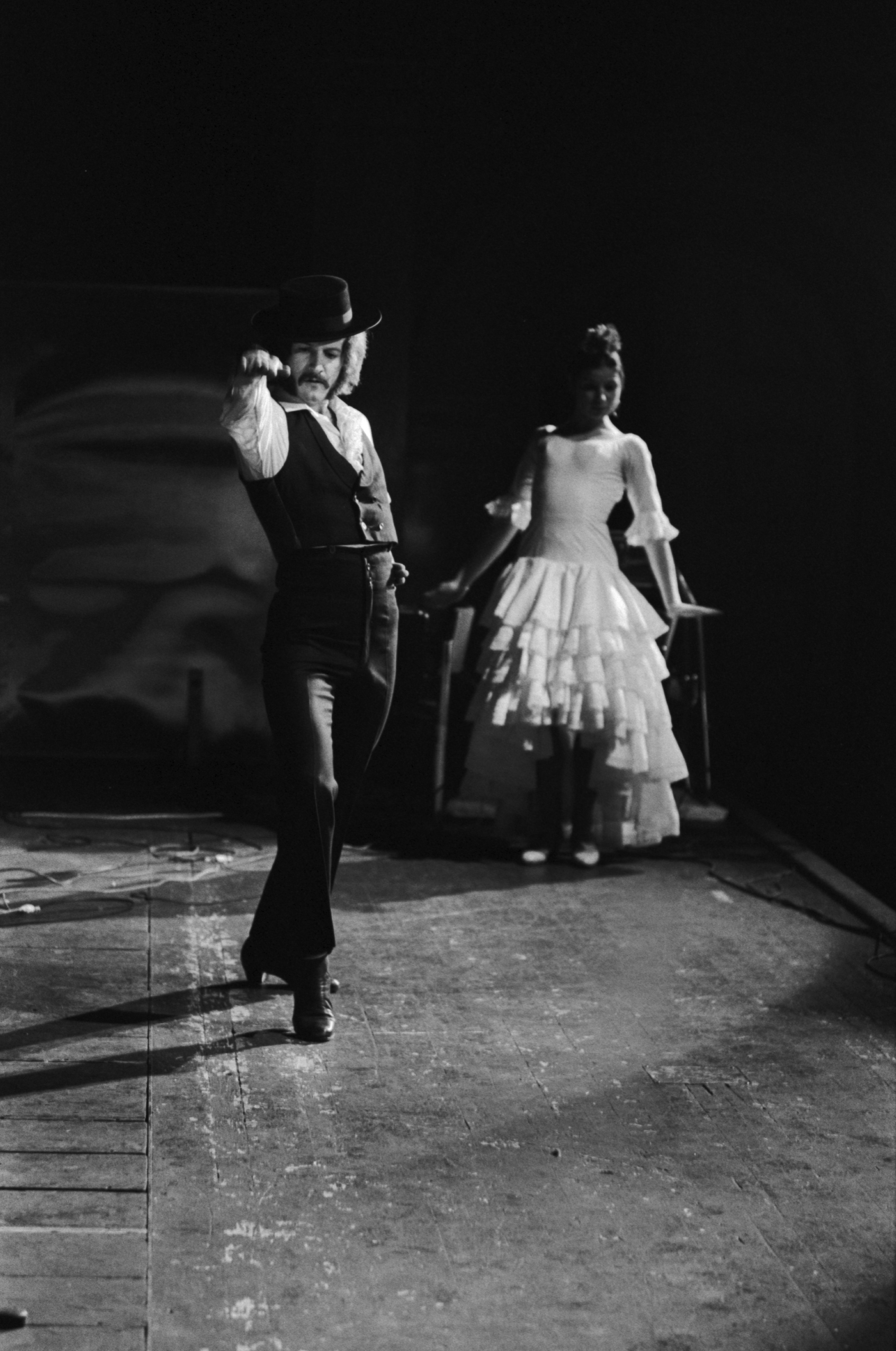
Finnish flamenco dancer Reima Nikkinen with an unidentified woman dancer in December 1971

In the 1970s, there were airs of social and political change in Spain, and Spanish society was already quite influenced by various musical styles from the rest of Europe and the United States. There were also numerous singers who had grown up listening to Antonio Mairena, Pepe Marchena and Manolo Caracol. The combination of both factors led to a revolutionary period called flamenco fusion.

The singer Rocío Jurado internationalized flamenco at the beginning of the 70s, replacing the bata de cola with evening dresses. Her facet in the "Fandangos de Huelva" and in the Alegrías was recognized internationally for her perfect voice tessitura in these genres. She used to be accompanied in her concerts by guitarists Enrique de Melchor and Tomatito, not only at the national level but in countries like Colombia, Venezuela and Puerto Rico.

The musical representative José Antonio Pulpón was a decisive character in that fusion, as he urged the cantaor Agujetas to collaborate with the Sevillian Andalusian rock group "Pata Negra", the most revolutionary couple since Antonio Chacón and Ramón Montoya, initiating a new path for flamenco. It also fostered the artistic union between the virtuoso guitarist from Algeciras Paco de Lucía and the long-standing singer from the island Camarón de la Isla, who gave a creative impulse to flamenco that would mean its definitive break with Mairena's conservatism. When both artists undertook their solo careers, Camarón became a mythical cantaor for his art and personality, with a legion of followers, while Paco de Lucía reconfigured the entire musical world of flamenco, opening up to new influences, such as Brazilian music, Arabic and jazz and introducing new musical instruments such as the Peruvian cajon, the transverse flute, etc.

Other leading performers in this process of formal flamenco renewal were Juan Peña El Lebrijano, who married flamenco with Andalusian music, and Enrique Morente, who throughout his long artistic career has oscillated between the purism of his first recordings and the crossbreeding with rock, or Remedios Amaya from Triana, cultivator of a unique style of tangos from Extremadura, and a wedge of purity in her cante make her part of this select group of established artists. Other singers with their own style include Cancanilla de Marbella. In 2011 this style became known in India thanks to María del Mar Fernández, who acts in the video clip of the film You Live Once, entitled Señorita. The film was seen by more than 73 million viewers.

=== New flamenco ===
In the 1980s a new generation of flamenco artists emerged who had been influenced by the mythical cantaor Camarón, Paco de Lucía, Morente, etc. These artists were interested in popular urban music, which in those years was renewing the Spanish music scene, it was the time of the Movida madrileña. Among them are "Pata Negra", who fused flamenco with blues and rock, Ketama, of pop and Cuban inspiration and Ray Heredia, creator of his own musical universe where flamenco occupies a central place.

Also the recording company Nuevos Medios released many musicians under the label nuevo flamenco and this denomination has grouped musicians very different from each other like Rosario Flores, daughter of Lola Flores, or the renowned singer Malú, niece of Paco de Lucía and daughter of Pepe de Lucía, who despite sympathizing with flamenco and keeping it in her discography has continued with her personal style. However, the fact that many of the interpreters of this new music are also renowned cantaores, in the case of José Mercé, El Cigala, and others, has led to labeling everything they perform as flamenco, although the genre of their songs differs quite a bit from the classic flamenco. This has generated very different feelings, both for and against.

Other contemporary artists of that moment were O'Funkillo and Ojos de Brujo, Arcángel, Miguel Poveda, Mayte Martín, Marina Heredia, Estrella Morente or Manuel Lombo, etc.

Debate surrounding the distinction between traditional flamenco and new flamenco intensified after 2019. This discussion was driven by the rising popularity of the new genre among younger demographics in Spain and international music markets, centering on how to properly classify and label the fusion style.

One of the artists who has reinvented flamenco is Rosalía, an indisputable name on the international music scene. "Pienso en tu mirá", "Di mi nombre" or the song that catapulted her to fame, "Malamente", are a combination of styles that includes a flamenco/south Spain traditional musical base. Rosalía has broken the limits of this musical genre by embracing other urban rhythms, but has also created a lot of controversy about which genre is she using. The Catalan artist has been awarded several Latin Grammy Awards and MTV Video Music Awards, which also, at just 30 years old, garners more than 40 million monthly listeners on Spotify.

Other successful musical artists that have incorporated flamenco into their music are, the Granada-born Dellafuente, C. Tangana, MAKA, RVFV, Demarco Flamenco, Maria Àrnal and Marcel Bagés, El Niño de Elche, Sílvia Pérez Cruz; Califato 3/4, Juanito Makandé, Soledad Morente, María José Llergo o Fuel Fandango are only a few of the new spanish musical scene that includes flamenco in their music.

=== Flamenco culture overseas ===
The state of New Mexico, located in the southwest of the United States, maintains a strong identity with flamenco culture. The University of New Mexico located in Albuquerque offers a graduate degree program in flamenco. Flamenco performances are widespread in the Albuquerque and Santa Fe communities, with the National institute of Flamenco sponsoring an annual festival, as well as a variety of professional flamenco performances offered at various locales.

== Main Palos ==
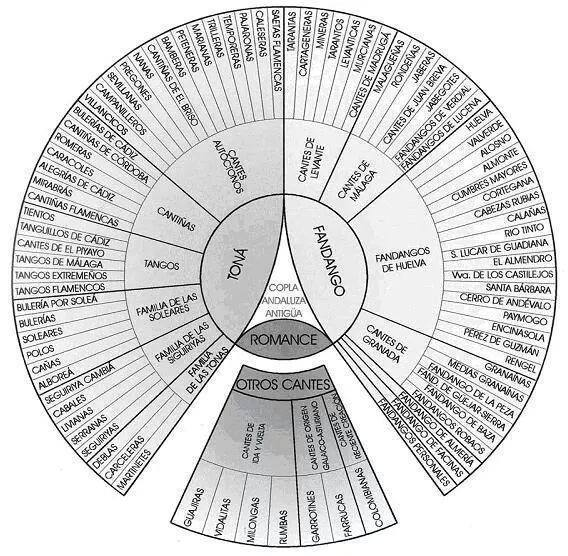
The Palos of flamenco

Palos (formerly known as cantes) are flamenco styles, classified by criteria such as rhythmic pattern, mode, chord progression, stanzaic form and geographic origin. There are over 50 different palos, some are sung unaccompanied while others have guitar or other accompaniment. Some forms are danced while others are not. Some are reserved for men and others for women while some may be performed by either, though these traditional distinctions are breaking down: the Farruca, for example, once a male dance, is now commonly performed by women too.

There are many ways to categorize Palos but they traditionally fall into three classes: the most serious is known as cante jondo (or cante grande), while lighter, frivolous forms are called Cante Chico. Forms that do not fit either category are classed as Cante Intermedio (Pohren 2005, 68). These are the best known palos (Anon. 2019; Anon. 2012):

=== Alegrías ===
The alegrías are thought to derive from the Aragonese jota, which took root in Cadiz during the Peninsular war and the establishment of the Cortes de Cadiz. That is why its classic lyrics contain so many references to the Virgen del Pilar, the Ebro River and Navarra.

Enrique Butrón is considered to have formalized the current flamenco style of alegrías and Ignacio Espeleta who introduced the characteristic "tiriti, tran, tran...". Some of the best known interpreters of alegrías are Enrique el Mellizo, Chato de la Isla, Pinini, Pericón de Cádiz, Aurelio Sellés, La Perla de Cádiz, Chano Lobato and El Folli.

One of the structurally strictest forms of flamenco, a traditional dance in alegrías must contain each of the following sections: a salida (entrance), paseo (walkaround), silencio (similar to an adagio in ballet), castellana (upbeat section) zapateado (Literally "a tap of the foot") and bulerías. This structure though, is not followed when alegrías are sung as a standalone song (with no dancing). In that case, the stanzas are combined freely, sometimes together with other types of cantiñas.

Alegrías has a rhythm consisting of 12 beats. It is similar to Soleares. Its beat emphasis is as follows: 1 2 [3] 4 5 [6] 7 [8] 9 [10] 11 [12]. Alegrías originated in Cádiz. Alegrías belongs to the group of palos called Cantiñas and it is usually played in a lively rhythm (120–170 beats per minute). The livelier speeds are chosen for dancing, while quieter rhythms are preferred for the song alone.

=== Bulerías ===
Bulerías a fast flamenco rhythm made up of a 12 beat cycle with emphasis in two general forms as follows: [12] 1 2 [3] 4 5 [6] 7 [8] 9 [10] 11 or [12] 1 2 [3] 4 5 6 [7] [8] 9 [10] 11. It originated among the Calé Romani people of Jerez during the 19th century, originally as a fast, upbeat ending to soleares or alegrias. It is among the most popular and dramatic of the flamenco forms and often ends any flamenco gathering, often accompanied by vigorous dancing and tapping.

=== Guajiras ===
The Guajira style came from the cultural exchange between Spain and Cuba. Its origin is specific to the original Cuban Guajira peasant music.It is a cheerful, elegant and lyrical palo, less dramatic than other flamenco styles. It uses a 12-beat measure, similar to the other palos although a lighter and more melodic character. The Guajira also has a dance version, which includes the use of a fan as a scenic element.

=== Rondeñas ===
Rondeña is associated with Ronda and the Province of Málaga in Andalusia. It belongs to the broad family of Málaga fandangos and is usually classified among the cantes de Málaga,

== Music ==
There are three fundamental elements which can help define whether or not something really is flamenco: A flamenco mode -or musical tonality-; the compás -rhythm- and the performer. .. who should be a Flamenco! All three of these elements: tonality, compás, a flamenco performer and then something less easily identifiable- Flamencura- must be present together if we are to wend up with a piece of music which can be labelled 'flamenco'. By themselves, these elements won't turn a piece of music into flamenco.

— (Martinez 2011, 6)

Three fundamental elements that help define whether or not a dance belongs to the Flamenco genre are the presence of a Flamenco mode (musical tonality), compas, and a Flamenco performer (Martinez, 2003). These three elements contribute to the authenticity of a Flamenco performance also known as flamencura (Martinez, 2003). There is also no such thing as a passive audience during Flamenco performances [participatory music]. The audience joins in the performance by clapping their hands and even sometimes singing along (Totton, 2003).

— (Akombo 2016, 243)

=== Structure ===
A typical flamenco recital with voice and guitar accompaniment comprises a series of pieces (not exactly "songs") in different palos. Each song is a set of verses (called copla, tercio, or letras), punctuated by guitar interludes (falsetas). The guitarist also provides a short introduction setting the tonality, compás (see below) and tempo of the cante (Manuel 2006, 98). In some palos, these falsetas are played with a specific structure too; for example, the typical sevillanas is played in an AAB pattern, where A and B are the same falseta with only a slight difference in the ending (Martin 2002, 48).

=== Harmony ===
Flamenco uses the flamenco mode (which can also be described as the modern Phrygian mode (modo frigio), or a harmonic version of that scale with a major 3rd degree), in addition to the major and minor scales commonly used in modern Western music. The Phrygian mode occurs in palos such as soleá, most bulerías, siguiriyas, tangos and tientos.

Descending E Phrygian scale in flamenco music, with common alterations in parentheses

A typical chord sequence, usually called the "Andalusian cadence" may be viewed as in a modified Phrygian: in E the sequence is Am–G–F–E (Manuel 2006, 96). According to Manolo Sanlúcar E is here the tonic, F has the harmonic function of dominant while Am and G assume the functions of subdominant and mediant respectively (Torres Cortés 2001).

Guitarists tend to use only two basic inversions or "chord shapes" for the tonic chord (music), the open 1st inversion E and the open 3rd inversion A, though they often transpose these by using a capo. Modern guitarists such as Ramón Montoya, have introduced other positions: Montoya himself started to use other chords for the tonic in the modern Dorian sections of several palos; F♯ for tarantas, B for granaínas and A♭ for the minera. Montoya also created a new palo as a solo for guitar, the rondeña in C♯ with scordatura. Later guitarists have further extended the repertoire of tonalities, chord positions and scordatura.

There are also palos in major mode; most cantiñas and alegrías, guajiras, some bulerías and tonás, and the cabales (a major type of siguiriyas). The minor mode is restricted to the Farruca, the milongas (among cantes de ida y vuelta), and some styles of tangos, bulerías, etc. In general traditional palos in major and minor mode are limited harmonically to two-chord (tonic–dominant) or three-chord (tonic–subdominant–dominant) progressions (Rossy 1998, 92). However modern guitarists have introduced chord substitution, transition chords, and even modulation.

Fandangos and derivative palos such as malagueñas, tarantas and cartageneras are bimodal: guitar introductions are in Phrygian mode while the singing develops in major mode, modulating to Phrygian at the end of the stanza (Rossy 1998, 92).

=== Melody ===
Dionisio Preciado, quoted by Sabas de Hoces (1982, ), established the following characteristics for the melodies of flamenco singing:

1. Microtonality: presence of intervals smaller than the semitone.
2. Portamento: frequently, the change from one note to another is done in a smooth transition, rather than using discrete intervals.
3. Short tessitura or range: Most traditional flamenco songs are limited to a range of a sixth (four tones and a half). The impression of vocal effort is the result of using different timbres, and variety is accomplished by the use of microtones.
4. Use of enharmonic scale. While in equal temperament scales, enharmonics are notes with identical pitch but different spellings (e.g. A♭ and G♯); in flamenco, as in unequal temperament scales, there is a microtonal intervalic difference between enharmonic notes.
5. Insistence on a note and its contiguous chromatic notes (also frequent in the guitar), producing a sense of urgency.
6. Baroque ornamentation, with an expressive, rather than merely aesthetic function.
7. Apparent lack of regular rhythm, especially in the siguiriyas: the melodic rhythm of the sung line is different from the metric rhythm of the accompaniment.
8. Most styles express sad and bitter feelings.
9. Melodic improvisation: flamenco singing is not, strictly speaking, improvised, but based on a relatively small number of traditional songs, singers add variations on the spur of the moment.

Musicologist Hipólito Rossy adds the following characteristics (Rossy 1998, 97):

- Flamenco melodies are characterized by a descending tendency, as opposed to, for example, a typical opera aria, they usually go from the higher pitches to the lower ones, and from forte to piano, as was usual in ancient Greek scales.
- In many styles, such as soleá or siguiriya, the melody tends to proceed in contiguous degrees of the scale. Skips of a third or a fourth are rarer. However, in fandangos and fandango-derived styles, fourths and sixths can often be found, especially at the beginning of each line of verse. According to Rossy, this is proof of the more recent creation of this type of songs, influenced by Castilian jota.

=== Compás or time signature ===
Compás is the Spanish word for metre or time signature (in classical music theory). It also refers to the rhythmic cycle, or layout, of a palo.

The compás is fundamental to flamenco. Compás is most often translated as rhythm but it demands far more precise interpretation than any other Western style of music. If there is no guitarist available, the compás is rendered through hand clapping (palmas) or by hitting a table with the knuckles. The guitarist uses techniques like strumming (rasgueado) or tapping the soundboard (golpe). Changes of chords emphasize the most important downbeats.

Flamenco uses three basic counts or measures: Binary, Ternary and a form of a twelve-beat cycle that is unique to flamenco. There are also free-form styles including, among others, the tonás, saetas, malagueñas, tarantos, and some types of fandangos:

- Rhythms in 2/4 or 4/4. These metres are used in forms like tangos, tientos, gypsy rumba, zambra and tanguillos.
- Rhythms in 3/4. These are typical of fandangos and sevillanas, suggesting their origin as non-Roma styles, since the 3/4 and 4/4 measures are not common in ethnic Roma music.
- 12-beat rhythms usually rendered in amalgams of 6/8 + 3/4 and sometimes 12/8. The 12-beat cycle is the most common in flamenco, differentiated by the accentuation of the beats in different palos. The accents do not correspond to the classic concept of the downbeat. The alternating of groups of 2 and 3 beats is also common in Spanish folk dances of the 16th century such as the zarabanda, jácara and canarios.

There are three types of 12-beat rhythms, which vary in their layouts, or use of accentuations: soleá, seguiriya and bulería:

1. peteneras and guajiras: 1 2 **3** 4 5 **6** 7 **8** 9 **10** 11 **12**. Both palos start with the strong accent on 12. Hence the meter is **12** 1 2 **3** 4 5 **6** 7 **8** 9 **10** 11.
2. The seguiriya, liviana, serrana, toná liviana, cabales: **12** 1 **2** 3 **4** 5 6 **7** 8 9 **10** 11 **12**. It could also be counted like starting a bulerías scheme from **8** (see below).
3. soleá, within the cantiñas group of palos which includes the alegrías, cantiñas, mirabras, romera, caracoles and soleá por bulería (also "bulería por soleá"): 1 2 **3** 4 5 **6** 7 **8** 9 **10** 11 **12**. For practical reasons, when transferring flamenco guitar music to sheet music, this rhythm is written as a regular 3/4.

The Bulerías is the emblematic palo of flamenco: today its 12-beat cycle is most often played with accents on the 3rd, 6th, 8th, 10th and 12th beats. The accompanying palmas are played in groups of 6 beats, giving rise to a multitude of counter-rhythms and percussive voices within the 12 beat compás. In certain regions like, Jerez, Spain, the rhythm stays in a simpler six-count rhythm, only including the twelve count in a musical resolve. This is like starting the counting at 9 so it goes this way: 9 10 11 12 1 2 - again, bold means the emphasis when clapping. In real life it is counted from 1 like: 1 2 3 4 5 6 and so on.

Flamenco Bulerías with emphasis as [12] 1 2 [3] 4 5 [6] 7 [8] 9 [10] 11 – also the rhythm for the song "America" from West Side Story

=== Musical complexity and classical reception ===
Although flamenco is often described as a folk, popular or oral tradition, many scholars and performers also treat it as a complex musical system. Its sophistication lies not only in vocal intensity or dance virtuosity, but also in the interaction of mode, harmony, compás, melodic variation, improvisation, guitar technique and formal conventions. The musical identity of a palo may depend simultaneously on its rhythmic cycle, melodic contour, cadential formulas, stanzaic form, local tradition and performance practice.

This complexity is especially evident in the relation between cante, guitar and rhythm. In many palos, singers do not simply reproduce fixed melodies, but vary inherited melodic models through ornamentation, portamento, microtonal inflection, rhythmic displacement and expressive timing. Computational and musicological studies have described flamenco as a tradition with distinctive melodic and rhythmic elements, spontaneous or semi-improvised interpretation, and a large diversity of styles. Other researchers have described flamenco as a "complex and rich" musical tradition whose analysis has drawn on musicology, mathematics, engineering and computer science.

The flamenco guitar adds another layer of technical and musical elaboration. Flamenco guitarists must combine accompaniment, percussion, harmonic support, melodic interludes and rhythmic control. Techniques such as rasgueado, alzapúa, picado, tremolo, golpes and thumb work are not merely decorative; they articulate the compás, answer the singer, cue the dancer and create solo passages called falsetas. Modern flamenco guitar has also expanded the harmonic vocabulary of the tradition through chord substitution, modulation, new guitar positions and concert-style solo composition.(Manuel 2006, 96–98)

Because of these features, flamenco has often attracted listeners and performers from the world of classical music. The interest is partly historical. In 1922, the composer Manuel de Falla and the poet Federico García Lorca helped organize the Concurso de Cante Jondo in Granada in an effort to dignify and preserve what they regarded as the deepest forms of Andalusian song. Falla's own music, including works such as El amor brujo, La vida breve and Nights in the Gardens of Spain, is frequently discussed in relation to Andalusian and flamenco materials.

Flamenco's appeal to classical audiences has also been reinforced by the development of concert flamenco guitar. Guitarists such as Ramón Montoya, Sabicas, Paco Peña and Paco de Lucía helped present flamenco guitar as a solo concert instrument as well as an accompaniment for song and dance. Carnegie Hall describes Paco de Lucía as one of the world's most celebrated flamenco guitarists and notes that his work embraced traditional, classical, jazz and contemporary elements. His 1991 recording of Joaquín Rodrigo's Concierto de Aranjuez became a notable example of a flamenco guitarist entering a canonical classical-guitar repertory.

The institutional presence of flamenco in conservatories has further connected it with classical-music education. Codarts Rotterdam states that flamenco guitar was added to its curriculum in 1985, before comparable formal studies were available in Spain itself. The same institution describes flamenco as a modal and rhythmically complex tradition rooted in Andalusia and shaped through interaction among Romani, Andalusian, North African and Mediterranean communities.

For these reasons, flamenco occupies an unusual position between oral tradition, popular performance, concert art and academic study. It remains rooted in social performance, dance, local styles and oral transmission, but its rhythmic, modal and technical resources have also made it attractive to classical musicians, conservatory students and concert-hall audiences.

=== Influence on classical and orchestral music ===
Flamenco has influenced classical and orchestral music both as a source of musical material and as a performance practice that has been adapted for concert settings. This relationship is distinct from traditional flamenco performance, which is normally centered on cante, guitar, dance, palmas and compás. In orchestral and classical contexts, flamenco elements may appear through rhythm, modal harmony, vocal style, dance gesture, guitar idiom, Andalusian imagery or the use of specific flamenco forms.

A major early example is the work of Manuel de Falla. Falla developed an interest in native Spanish music, especially Andalusian flamenco, while studying with Felip Pedrell in Madrid. His ballet El Amor Brujo was written for the flamenco dancer and singer Pastora Imperio and was originally described as a gitanería in one act and two scenes. The Los Angeles Philharmonic notes that Falla was studying cante jondo at the time of the work and that every musical aspect of El Amor Brujo reveals the influence of that study, while also emphasizing that Falla did not simply quote folk songs but created original music from his knowledge of the idiom.

Flamenco also entered orchestral writing through the classical guitar concerto tradition. Federico Moreno Torroba's Concierto en Flamenco is a notable boundary case: it is a classical concerto for guitar and orchestra, but its title and idiom explicitly invoke flamenco. Naxos describes the work as requiring an exceptional soloist and notes Pepe Romero's interpretations in both classical and flamenco genres. A recording of the work also associates it with Sabicas, the Orquesta de Conciertos de Madrid and Moreno Torroba as conductor. The work is therefore better understood as a classical orchestral composition using flamenco materials than as traditional flamenco itself.

Flamenco's relationship with orchestral music also developed through works written by flamenco composers themselves. Manolo Sanlúcar was one of the most important figures in this area. His Fantasía para Guitarra y Orquesta was an early attempt to place flamenco guitar in dialogue with the concerto tradition; Classical Guitar magazine describes it as an ambitious four-movement work with influences from Joaquín Rodrigo and the Spanish classical-guitar repertory.

Sanlúcar's Medea is another important example. It was originally created as a ballet score in 1984 for the Ballet Nacional de España, with choreography by José Granero. Program notes for a later orchestral performance describe Medea as existing in several forms: a 1984 ballet score, a 2002 version for two guitars and orchestra, and a 2012 version for solo guitar and orchestra. In this sense, Medea is not merely a classical work inspired by flamenco from the outside, but a flamenco composer's own expansion of flamenco language into ballet and orchestral form.

Other flamenco composers have also written or recorded works involving orchestra. Paco de Lucía's 1972 album El Duende Flamenco de Paco de Lucía has been described in flamenco-guitar publishing contexts as an important record in which the composer plays with orchestra in several pieces. Although Paco de Lucía is more often discussed for his work with more traditional flamenco instrumentation, this album shows that orchestral colour was already part of some experiments in flamenco composition.

The relationship between flamenco and orchestra also appears in recordings centered on cante. Camarón de la Isla's 1989 album Soy Gitano was released with the Royal Philharmonic Orchestra and Tomatito. The title track is identified as a tangos and credited to Camarón de la Isla, the Royal Philharmonic Orchestra and Tomatito. This makes the album a notable example of orchestral production being applied to a major flamenco singer rather than only to guitar or dance.

Vicente Amigo's Poeta is another notable case. The work was originally titled Concierto Flamenco para un Marinero en Tierra and was based on the poetry of Rafael Alberti. It was written for flamenco guitar and symphony orchestra, with orchestration by Leo Brouwer. The Fes Festival describes Poeta as a creation for flamenco guitar and symphony orchestra.

In contemporary classical music, Mauricio Sotelo has developed one of the most sustained compositional engagements with flamenco. Sotelo describes himself as the creator of "spectral flamenco" or "alter flamenco". Universal Edition similarly describes his music as integrating flamenco into avant-garde composition and as developing a style known as "spectral Flamenco". His catalogue includes orchestral works with flamenco voice, such as Elegía. Fragmento, for cantaor or contralto, orchestra and sound carrier, premiered by Arcángel with the Orquesta Sinfónica de RTVE, and Arde El Alba, for soprano, cantaor and orchestra.

These examples show several related but different processes. First, classical composers such as Falla and Moreno Torroba drew on flamenco and Andalusian musical materials in orchestral or concerto works. Second, flamenco composers themselves, including Sanlúcar, Paco de Lucía and Vicente Amigo, have written or reworked flamenco-based music for orchestra, ballet, concerto-like forms and symphonic concert settings. Third, singers and contemporary composers, including Camarón de la Isla and Mauricio Sotelo, have brought cante and flamenco vocal practice into orchestral and avant-garde contexts. In all of these cases, the orchestra does not replace traditional flamenco practice, but provides another medium through which flamenco rhythm, sonority, gesture and expressive language can be expanded.

== Forms of flamenco expression ==
=== Toque (guitar) ===
The posture and technique of flamenco guitarists, called "tocaores", differs from that used by the players of classical guitar. While the classical guitarist supports the guitar on his left leg in an inclined way, the flamenco guitarist usually crosses his legs and supports it on the one that is higher, placing the neck in an almost horizontal position with respect to the ground. Modern guitarists usually use classical guitars, although there is a specific instrument for this genre called flamenco guitar. This is less heavy, and its body is narrower than that of the classical guitar, so its sound is lower and does not overshadow the cantaor. It is usually made of cypress wood, with the handle of cedar and the top of fir. The cypress gives it a brilliant sound very suitable for the characteristics of flamenco. Formerly, the palo santo from Rio or India was also used, being the first of higher quality, but currently it is in disuse due to its scarcity. The palo santo gave guitars an amplitude of sound especially suitable for solo playing. At present, the most widely used headstock is the metal one, since the wooden one poses tuning problems.

The main guitar makers were Antonio de Torres Jurado (Almería, 1817–1892) considered the father of the guitar, Manuel Ramírez de Galarreta, the Great Ramírez (Madrid, 1864 -1920), and his disciples Santos Hernández (Madrid, 1873–1943), who built several guitars for the maestro Sabicas, Domingo Esteso and Modesto Borreguero. Also noteworthy are the Conde Brothers, Faustino (1913–1988), Mariano (1916–1989) and Julio (1918–1996), nephews of Domingo Esteso, whose children and heirs continue the saga.

The guitarists use the technique of alzapúa, picado, the strum and the tremolo, among others. One of the first touches that is considered flamenco, such as the "rondeña", was the first composition recorded for solo guitar, by Julián Arcas (María, Almería, 1832 – Antequera, Málaga, 1882) in Barcelona in 1860. The strum can be performed with 5, 4 or 3 fingers, the latter invented by Sabicas. The use of the thumb is also characteristic of flamenco playing. Guitarists rest their thumb on the guitar's soundboard and their index and middle fingers on the string above the one they are playing, thus achieving greater power and sound than the classical guitarist. The middle finger is also placed on the pickguard of the guitar for more precision and strength when plucking the string. Likewise, the use of the pickguard as an element of percussion gives great strength to flamenco guitar playing. The melodic or flourishing phrase that is inserted between the chord sequences intended to accompany the couplet is called "falseta".

The accompaniment and solo playing of flamenco guitarists is based on both the modal harmonic system and the tonal system, although the most frequent is a combination of both. Some flamenco songs are performed "a palo seco" (a cappella), without guitar accompaniment.

=== Cante (song) ===
According to the Royal Spanish Academy, "cante" is called the "action or effect of singing any Andalusian singing", defining "flamenco singing" as "agitated Andalusian singing" and cante jondo as "the most genuine song. Andalusian, of deep feeling ". The interpreter of flamenco singing is called cantaor instead of singer, with the loss of the intervocalic characteristic of the Andalusian dialect.

The most important award in flamenco singing is probably the Llave de Oro del Cante, which has been awarded five times to: Tomás el Nitri, Manuel Vallejo, Antonio Mairena, Camarón de la Isla and Fosforito.

=== Baile (dance) ===
El baile flamenco is known for its emotional intensity, proud carriage, expressive use of the arms and rhythmic stamping of the feet, unlike tap dance or Irish dance which use different techniques. As with any dance form, many different styles of flamenco have developed.

In the 20th century, flamenco danced informally at gitano (Roma) celebrations in Spain was considered the most "authentic" form of flamenco. There was less virtuoso technique in gitano flamenco, but the music and steps are fundamentally the same. The arms are noticeably different from classical flamenco, curving around the head and body rather than extending, often with a bent elbow.

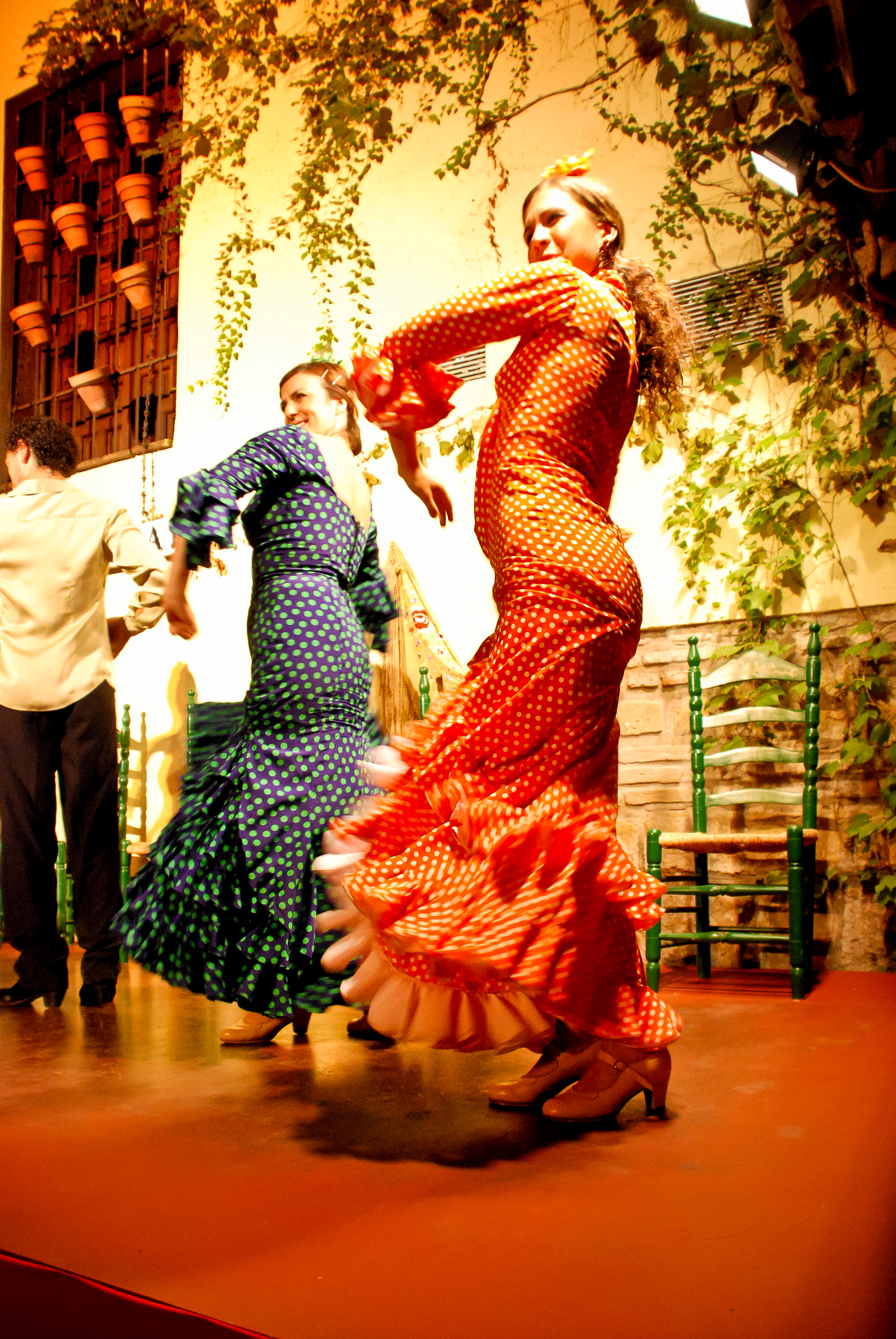
Flamenco, Córdoba

"Flamenco puro" otherwise known as "flamenco por derecho" is considered the form of performance flamenco closest to its gitano influences. In this style, the dance is often performed solo, and is based on signals and calls of structural improvisation rather than choreographed. In the improvisational style, castanets are not often used.

"Classical flamenco" is the style most frequently performed by Spanish flamenco dance companies. It is danced largely in a proud and upright style. For women, the back is often held in a marked back bend. Unlike the more gitano influenced styles, there is little movement of the hips, the body is tightly held, and the arms are long, like a ballet dancer. In fact, many of the dancers in these companies are trained in Ballet Clásico Español more than in the improvisational language of flamenco. Flamenco has both influenced and been influenced by Ballet Clásico Español, as evidenced by the fusion of the two ballets created by 'La Argentinita' in the early part of the 20th century and later, by Joaquín Cortés, eventually by the entire Ballet Nacional de España et al.

In the 1950s Jose Greco was one of the most famous male flamenco dancers, performing on stage worldwide and on television including the Ed Sullivan Show, and reviving the art almost singlehandedly. Greco's company left a handful of prominent pioneers, most notably: Maria Benitez and Vicente Romero of New Mexico. Today, there are many centers of flamenco art. Albuquerque, New Mexico is considered the "Center of the Nation" for flamenco art. Much of this is due to the late (d. 2024) María Benítez's 37 years of sold-out summer seasons. Albuquerque boasts three distinct prominent centers: National Institute of Flamenco, Casa Flamenca and Flamenco Works. Each center dedicates time to daily training, cultural diffusion and world-class performance equaled only to world-class performances one would find in the heart of Southern Spain, Andalucía.

Modern flamenco is a highly technical dance style requiring years of study. The emphasis for both male and female performers is on lightning-fast footwork performed with absolute precision. In addition, the dancer may have to dance while using props such as castanets, canes, shawls and fans.

"Flamenco nuevo" is a recent marketing phenomenon in flamenco. Marketed as a "newer version" of flamenco, its roots came from world-music promoters trying to sell albums of artists who created music that "sounded like" or had Spanish-style influences. Though some of this music was played in similar pitches, scales and was well-received, it has little to nothing to do with the art of flamenco guitar, dance, cante Jondo or the improvisational language. "Nuevo flamenco" consists largely of compositions and repertoire, while traditional flamenco music and dance is a language composed of stanzas, actuated by oral formulaic calls and signals.

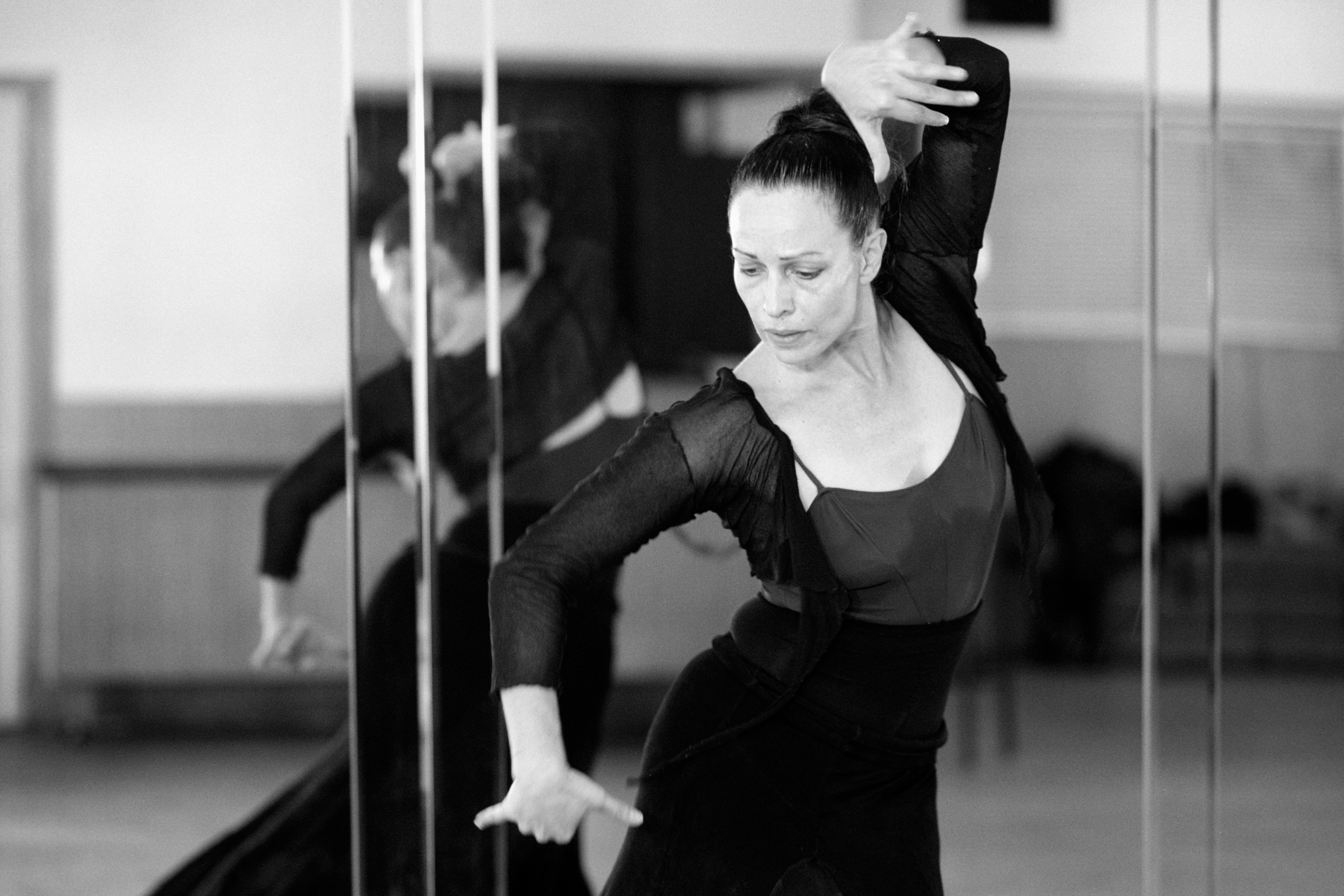
Los Angeles, United States

The flamenco most foreigners are familiar with is a style that was developed as a spectacle for tourists. To add variety, group dances are included and even solos are more likely to be choreographed. The frilly, voluminous spotted dresses are derived from a style of dress worn for the Sevillanas at the annual Feria in Seville.

In traditional flamenco, only the very young or older dancers are considered to have the emotional innocence or maturity to adequately convey the duende (soul) of the genre (Anon. 2010). Therefore, unlike other dance forms, where dancers turn professional through techniques early on to take advantage of youth and strength, many flamenco dancers do not hit their peak until their thirties and will continue to perform into their fifties and beyond. One artist that is considered a young master is Juan Manuel Fernandez Montoya, otherwise known as "Farruquito". At age 12, Farruquito was considered a pioneer and for "flamenco puro", or "flamenco por derecho", because of his emotional depth.

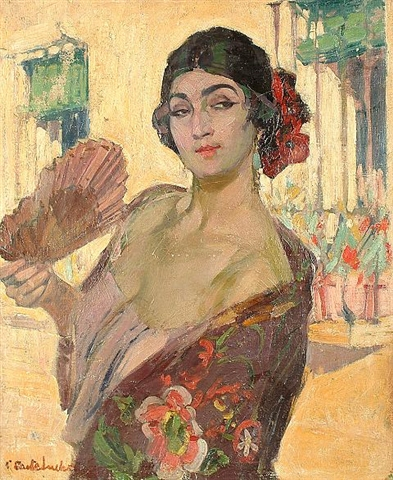
Claudio Castelucho, flamenco

Theatre flamenco work sample

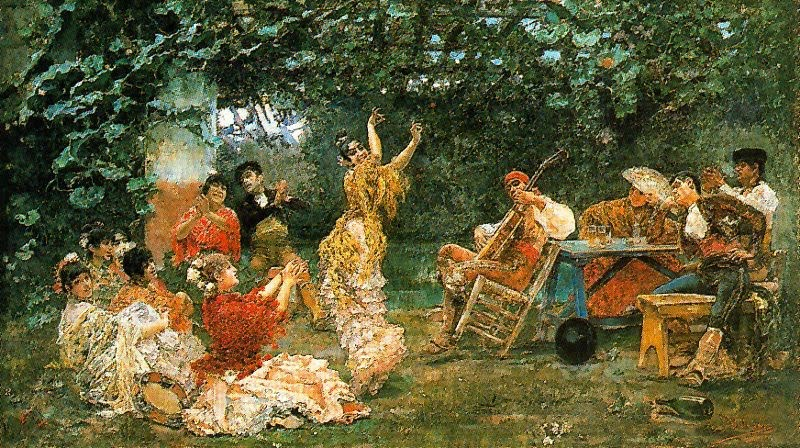
José Villegas Cordero, Baile Andaluz

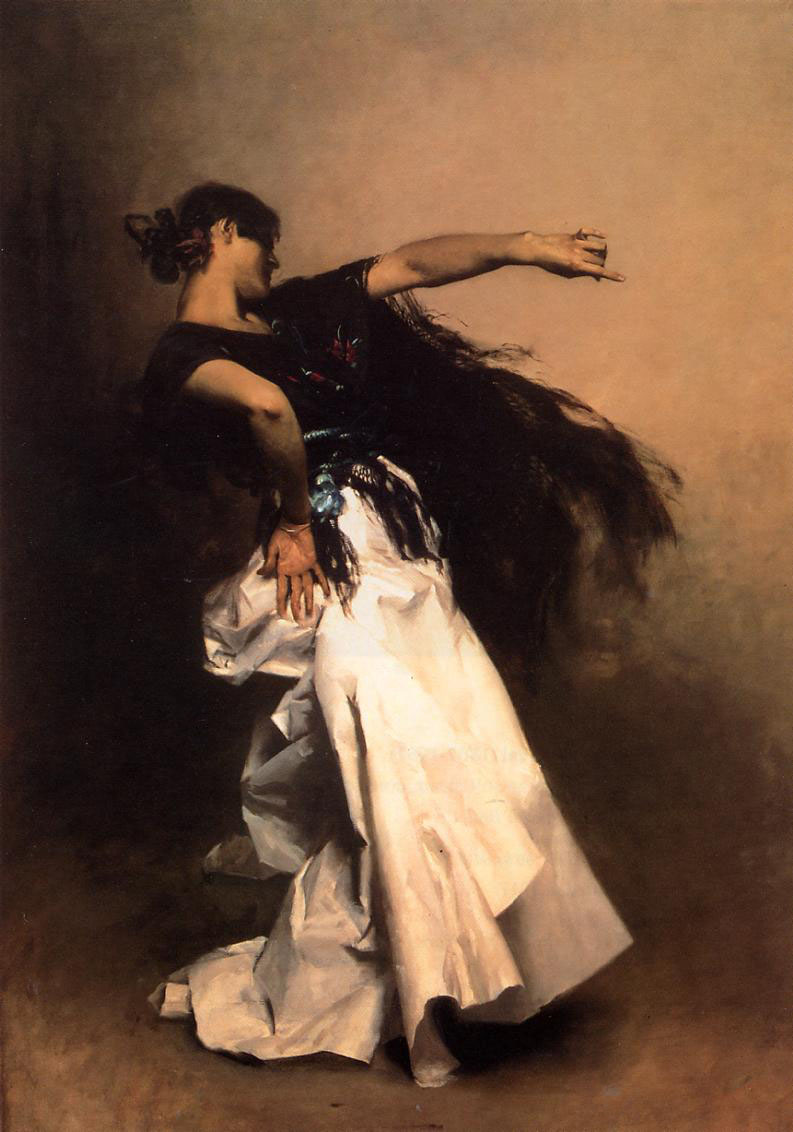
John Singer Sargent, Spanish Dancer

Scenes of flamenco performance in Seville.

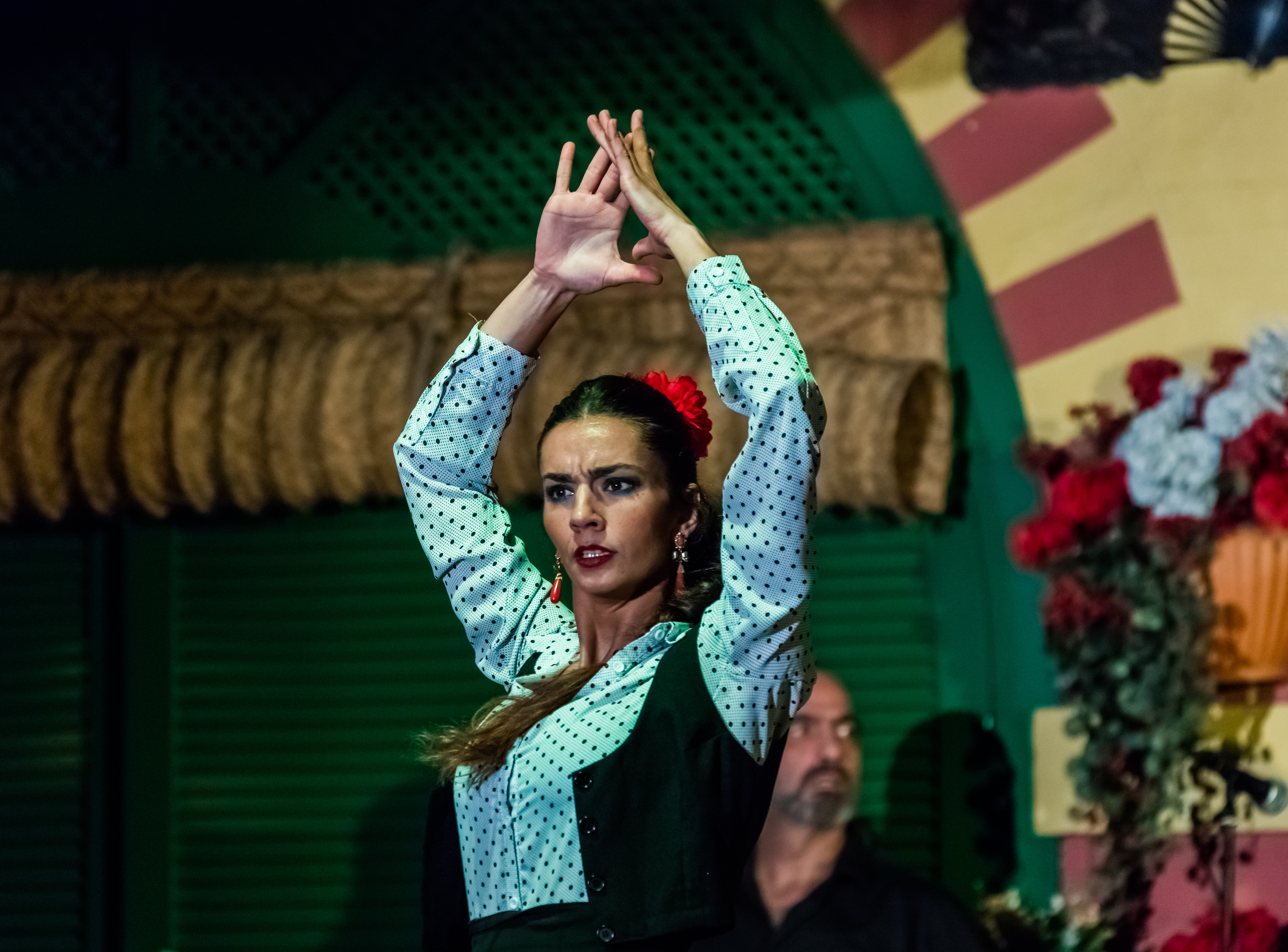

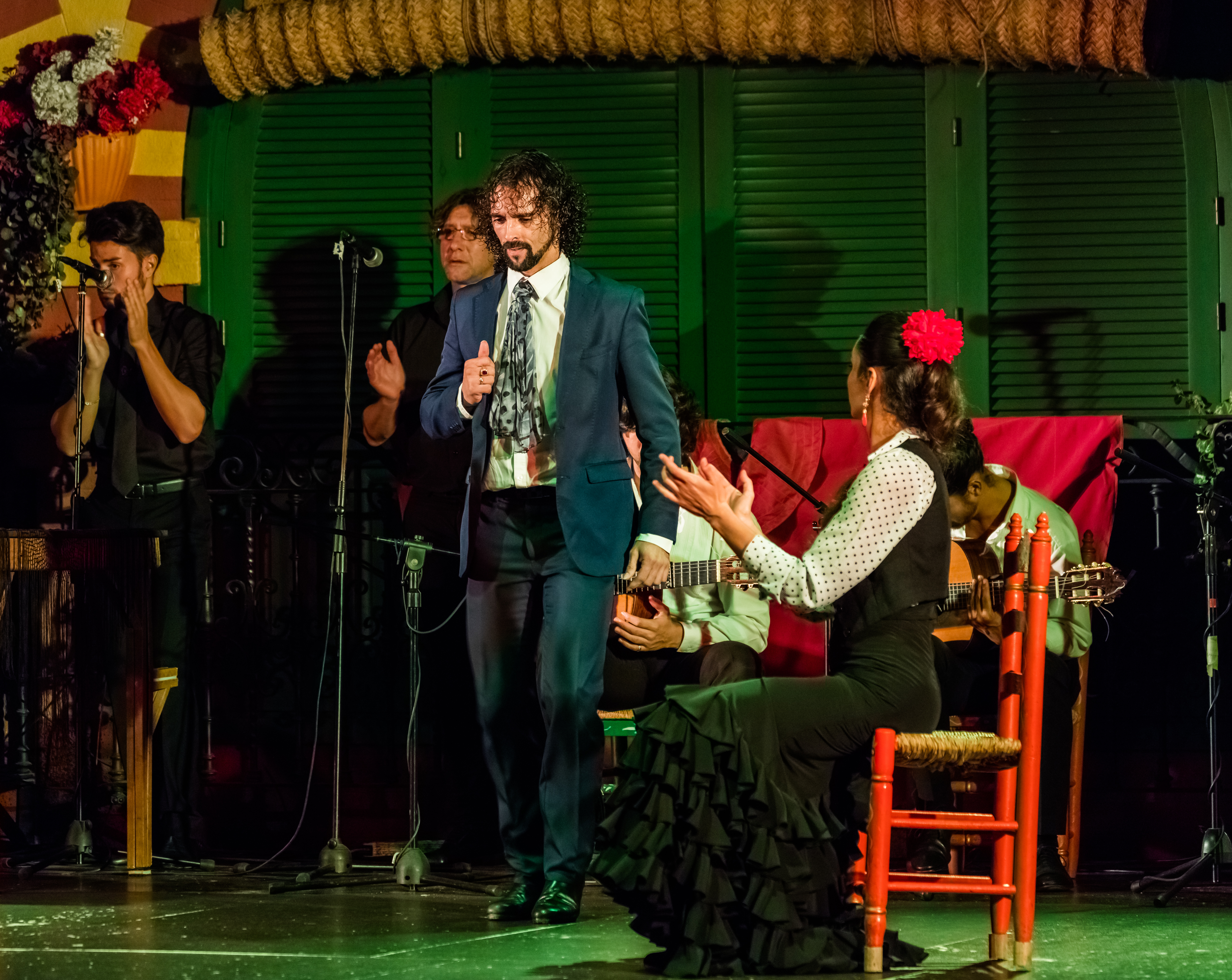

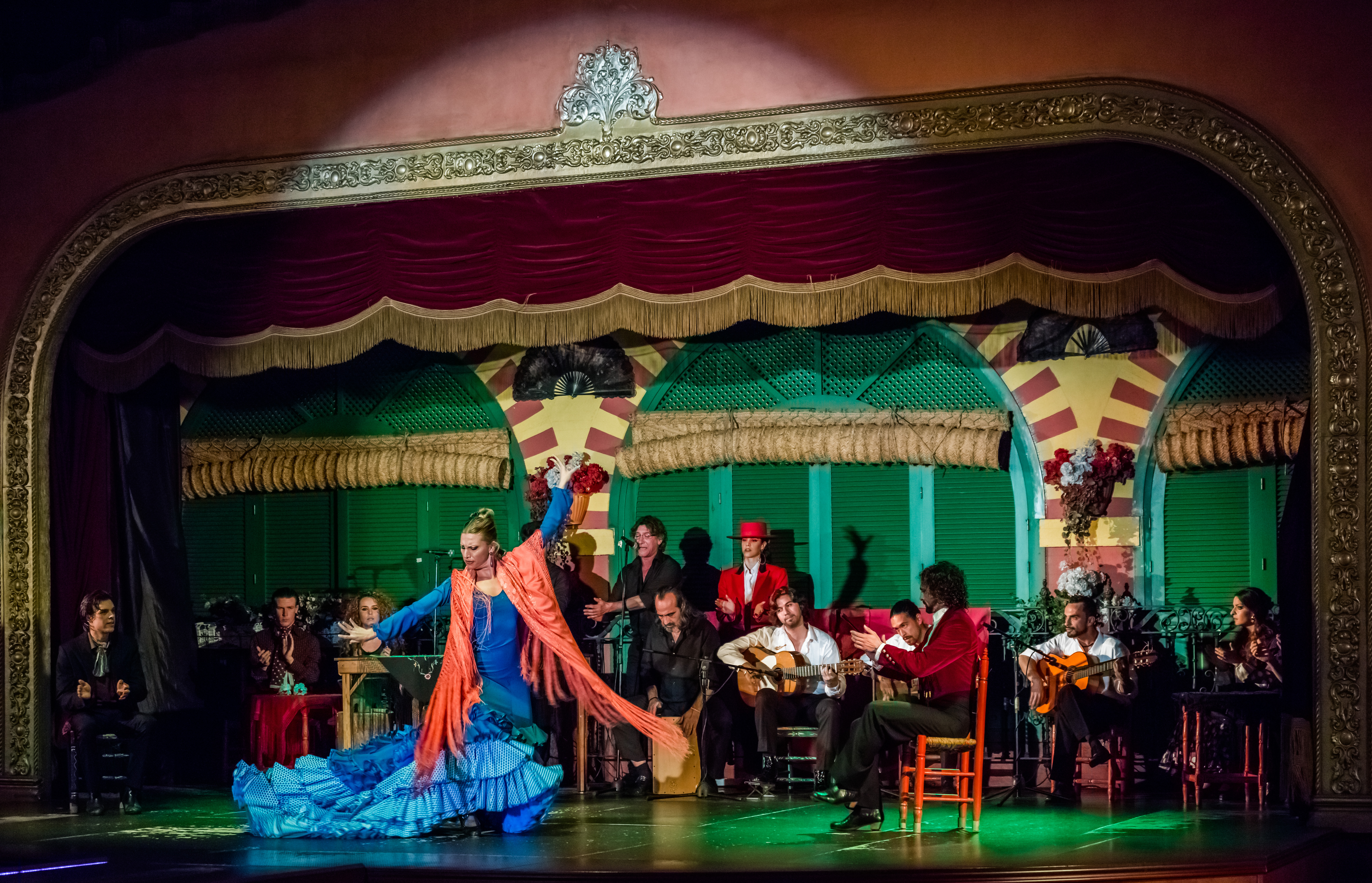

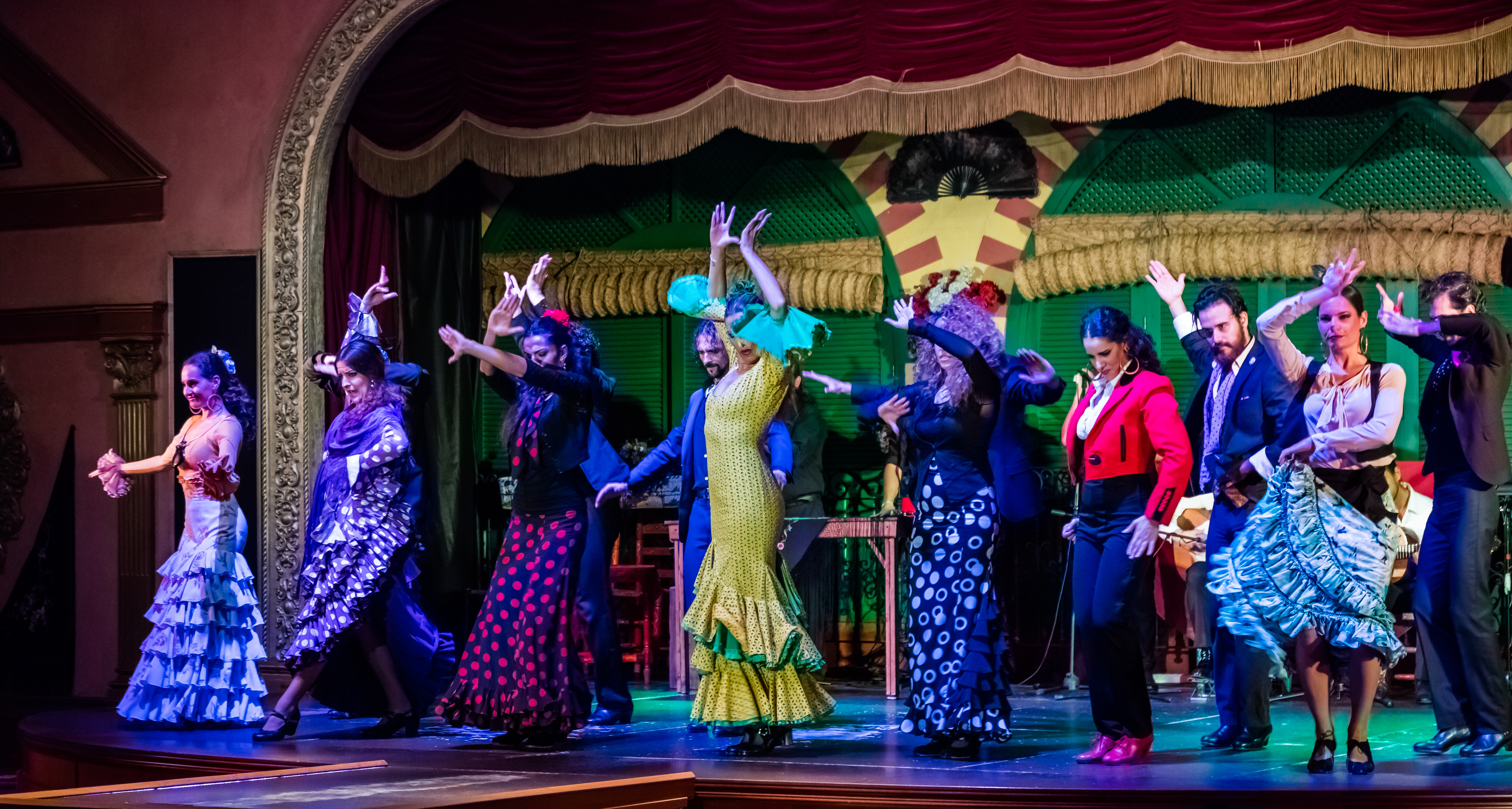

== Regulated teaching of flamenco in educational centers ==
In Spain, regulated flamenco studies are officially taught in various music conservatories, dance conservatories and music schools in various autonomous communities.

=== Conservatories of music ===
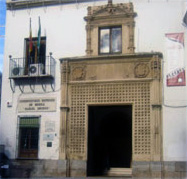
Rafael Orozco Superior Conservatory of Music of Córdoba.

Flamenco guitar studies in official educational centers began in Spain in 1988 at the hands of the great concert performer and teacher from Granada Manuel Cano Tamayo, who obtained a position as emeritus professor at the Superior Conservatory de Música Rafael Orozco from Córdoba.

There are specialized flamenco conservatories throughout the country, although mainly in the Andalusia region, such as the aforementioned Córdoba Conservatory, the Murcia Superior Music Conservatory or the Superior Music School of Catalonia, among others. Outside of Spain, a unique case is the Rotterdam Conservatory, in the Netherlands, which offers regulated flamenco guitar studies under the direction of maestro Paco Peña since 1985, a few years before they existed in Spain.

== University ==
In 2018 the first university master's degree in flamenco research and analysis begins, after the previous attempts of the "Doctorate Program of Approach to Flamenco", taught by several universities such as Huelva, Seville, Cádiz and Córdoba, among others.

=== History ===
The fandango, which in the 17th century was the most widespread song and dance throughout Spain, eventually ended up generating local and regional variants, especially in the province of Huelva. In Alta Andalucía and bordering areas, the fandangos were accompanied with the bandola, an instrument with which they accompanied themselves following a regular beat that allowed dancing and from whose name the style derives " abandoned ". Thus arose the fandangos of Lucena, the drones of Puente Genil, the primitive malagueñas, the rondeñas, the jaberas, the jabegotes, the verdiales, the chacarrá, the granaína, the taranto and the taranta. Due to the expansion of the Sevillanas in Baja Andalusia, the fandango gradually lost its role as a support for the dance, which allowed the singer to shine and freedom, generating a multitude of fandangos of personal creation in the 20th century. Likewise, thousands of Andalusian peasants, especially from the Eastern Andalusian provinces, emigrated to the mining sites Murcian, where the tarantos and taranta s evolved. The Tarante de Linares, evolved into the mining of the Union, the Cartagena and the Levantica. At the time of the cafés cantantes, some of these cantes were separated from the dance and acquired a free beat, which allowed the performers to show off. The great promoter of this process was Antonio Chacón, who developed precious versions of malagueñas, granainas and cantes mineros.

The stylization of romance and cord sheets gave rise to corrido. The extraction of the romances from quatrains or three significant verses gave rise to the primitive tonás, the caña and the polo, which share meter and melody, but differing in their execution. The guitar accompaniment gave them a beat that made them danceable. It is believed that their origin was in Ronda, a city in Alta Andalucía close to Baja Andalucía and closely related to it, and that from there they reached the Sevillian suburb of Triana, with a great tradition of corridos, where they became the soleá. From the festive performance of corridos and soleares, the jaleos arose in Triana, who traveled to Extremadura and in Jerez and Utrera led to the bulería, from where they spread throughout Baja Andalucía, generating local variations.

== Lexicon ==
=== Ole ===
Adolfo Salazar states that the expressive voice ole, with which Andalusian cantaores and bailaores are encouraged, can come from the Hebrew verb oleh which means "to throw upwards", showing that the dervish girovaghi of Tunisia, Maghreb, also dance around to the sound of repeated "ole" or "joleh". The use of the word "arza", which is the Andalusian dialect form, of pronouncing the voice imperative "rise", with the characteristic Andalusian equalization of / l / and / r / implosives. The indiscriminate use of the voices "arza" and "ole" is frequent when it comes to jalear, but the most evidence of the origin of this word can be from the caló: Olá, which means "come". Likewise, in Andalusia it is known as jaleo al ojeo de hunt, that is, the act of glancing, which is "driving away the game with voices, shots, blows or noise, so that they 'get up'".

=== Duende ===
According to the RAE dictionary (1956!) The "duende" in Andalusia is a "mysterious and ineffable charm", a charisma that the gitanos call duende. Federico García Lorca, in his lecture Teoría y juego del duende confirms this ineffability of the duende by defining it with the following words from Goethe: "Mysterious power that everyone feels and that no philosopher explains". In the flamenco imaginary, the duende goes beyond technique and inspiration, in Lorca's words "To search for the duende there is no map or exercise". When a flamenco artist experiences the arrival of this mysterious charm, the expressions "have duende" or sing, play or dance "with duende" are used.

Along with those previously mentioned, there are many other words and expressions characteristic of the flamenco genre, such as "tablao flamenco", "flamenco spree", "third", "aflamencar", and "flamenco".

== See also ==
- Concurso de Cante Jondo – (Contest of the Deep Song) was a fiesta of flamenco arts, music, song, and dance, held in Granada in 1922
- Festival Bienal Flamenco – in theatres Seville, this festival features flamenco puro to innovative new works by dancers, vocalists and guitarists
- Flamenco rumba – a style of flamenco music
- Flamenco rock – a rock music subgenre that emerged from Andalusia
- Flamenco shoes – commonly leather shoes constructed with small nails embedded in the toe and heel to enhance the sound of the dancer's percussive footwork
- Latin Grammy Award for Best Flamenco Album
- Kumpanía: Flamenco Los Angeles – a 2011 independent documentary film exploring the origins and contemporary Spanish culture of flamenco
- New flamenco – a derivative of traditional flamenco fusing flamenco guitar virtuosity with other musical styles
- Camarón de la Isla – considered one of the all-time greatest flamenco singers
- Paco de Lucia – a Spanish virtuoso flamenco guitarist, composer, and record producer
- David Peña Dorantes – a Romani flamenco pianist and composer from Andalusia
- Niño Josele – a Spanish guitarist, and exponent of the New flamenco style
- Paco Peña – regarded as one of the world's foremost traditional flamenco guitar players
- Sevillanas – a type of folk music and dance of Seville and its region, influenced by flamenco
- Silverio Franconetti – a singer and the leading figure of the period in flamenco history known as "The Golden Age"
- Tablao – a place where flamenco shows are performed and the term used for the flamenco dance floor
- Tomatito – a Spanish roma flamenco guitarist
- Traje de flamenca – the dress traditionally worn by women at festivals in Andalusia; one form worn by dancers
- María Pagés – a modern Spanish dancer and choreographer, considered the paramount representative of flamenco vanguard
- Cristina Hoyos – a Spanish flamenco dancer, choreographer and actress who played an important role during the opening and closing ceremonies of the 1992 Summer Olympics in Barcelona
- Vicente Amigo – a Spanish flamenco composer and guitarist
- Antoñita Singla – a Catalonian flamenco dancer and actress known as "La Singla" who took Spain and Europe by storm in the period 1960–1988.
- Flamenco zapateado notation – It is the graphic representation of the sonorous and motor aspects of the particular movements of flamenco dancing

== Sources ==
- Akombo, David (2016). The Unity of Music and Dance in World Cultures. North Carolina: McFarland Books. ISBN 978-0786497157.
- Aoyama, Yuko (2007). "The role of consumption and globalization in a cultural industry: The case of flamenco". Geoforum. 38 (1). Elsevier: 103–113. doi:10.1016/j.geoforum.2006.07.004.
- Álvarez Caballero, Ángel: El cante flamenco, Alianza Editorial, Madrid, Second edition, 1998. ISBN 84-206-9682-X (First edition: 1994)
- Álvarez Caballero, Ángel: La Discografía ideal del cante flamenco, Planeta, Barcelona, 1995. ISBN 84-08-01602-4
- Anon. 2010. "El flamenco es declarado Patrimonio Cultural Inmaterial de la Humanidad por la Unesco", El Periódico Extremadura, 16 November 2010 (accessed 11 November 2025).
- Anon. "Palos & compas ". Flamenco-Events.com (2012; accessed 19 March 2020).
- Anon. "Palos del Flamenco: Categorías". flamencoexport.com (2019, accessed 19 March 2020).
- Arredondo Pérez, Herminia, and Francisco J. García Gallardo: "Música flamenca. Nuevos artistas, antiguas tradiciones" In Andalucía en la música. Expresión de comunidad, construcción de identidad, edited by Francisco J. García y Herminia Arredondo. Sevilla: Centro de Estudios Andaluces, 2014, pp. 225–242. ISBN 978-84-942332-0-3
- Banzi, Julia Lynn (PhD): "Flamenco Guitar Innovation and the Circumscription of Tradition" 2007, 382 pages; AAT 328581, DAI-A 68/10, University of California, Santa Barbara.
- Caba Landa, Pedro, and Carlos Caba Landa. Andalucía, su comunismo y su cante jondo. First edition, Editorial Atlántico 1933. Third edition, Editorial Renacimiento 2008. ISBN 978-84-8472-348-6
- Cruces-Roldán, Cristina (2017). "Flamenco". In Prato, Paolo; Horn, David (eds.). Bloomsbury Encyclopedia of Popular Music of the World, Genres: Europe. Vol. 11. United Kingdom: Bloomsbury Academic. pp. 249–306. ISBN 978-1-5013-2612-7.
- Coelho, Víctor Anand (Editor): "Flamenco Guitar: History, Style, and Context", in The Cambridge Companion to the Guitar, Cambridge University Press, 2003, pp. 13–32.
- Devorah Bennahum, Ninotchka (2023). "Flamenco: Music and Dance". Encyclopædia Britannica. United States: Encyclopædia Britannica, Inc. ISBN 978-1-59339-292-5.
- Llano, Samuel (2020). "Flamenco as Palimpsest: Reading through Hybridity". In Davies, Catherine; O'Bryen, Rory (eds.). Transnational Spanish Studies. United Kingdom: Liverpool University Press. pp. 161–180. ISBN 9781789627282.
- Lorca, F.G. (1970). El Cante jondo: primitivo canto andaluz. Sección literatura (in Spanish). Alianza.
- Lorca, F.G. (2010). Poema del cante jondo - Romancero gitano (conferencias y poemas) (PDF) (in Spanish). Stockcero, Incorporated. ISBN 978-1-934768-37-2.
- Harper, Douglas. "flamenco". Online Etymology Dictionary..
- Hayes, Michelle Heffner (2009). Flamenco: Conflicting Histories of the Dance. North Carolina: McFarland Books. ISBN 978-0786439232.
- Herrera, Muhammad Ali (March 2006). "Breve biografía de Blas Infante". Alif Nûn (36).
- Hoces Bonavilla, Sabas de. n.d. "Acotaciones sobre algunos conceptos errados con el flamenco (1)". funjdiaz.net. Archived from the original on 24 September 2015. Revista de Folklore, no. 23:147–157 (archive from 24 September 2015).
- Holguín, Sandie (2019). Flamenco Nation: The Construction of Spanish National Identity. Madison: University of Wisconsin Press. pp. 25–57. doi:10.2307/j.ctvgc62dd. ISBN 9780299321802. JSTOR j.ctvgc62dd. S2CID 197774320.
- Infante, Blas (2010). Orígenes de lo Flamenco y Secreto del Cante Jondo (1929–1933) (PDF). Consejería de Cultura de la Junta de Andalucía. p. 166. Archived (PDF) from the original on 2 November 2013.
- Koster, Dennis (1 June 2002). Guitar Atlas, Flamenco. Alfred Music Publishing. ISBN 978-0-7390-2478-2.
- Leblon, Bernard (2003). Gypsies and Flamenco: The Emergence of the Art of Flamenco in Andalusia. Translated by Ni Shuinear, Sinead. Hatfield: University of Hertfordshire Press. ISBN 9781902806051.
- Machin-Autenrieth, Matthew (2015). "Flamenco ¿Algo Nuestro? (Something of Ours?): Music, Regionalism and Political Geography in Andalusia, Spain". Ethnomusicology Forum. 24 (1 (April)): 4–27. doi:10.1080/17411912.2014.966852. hdl:2164/17695. S2CID 217531496.
- Mairena, Antonio, and Ricardo Molina. Mundo y formas del cante flamenco, Librería Al-Ándalus, third edition, 1979 (First Edition: Revista de Occidente, 1963)
- Manuel, Peter (1986). "Evolution and Structure in Flamenco Harmony". Current Musicology. 42. Columbia University Press: 46–57. doi:10.7916/D88051HJ. S2CID 193937795.
- Manuel, Peter (1989). "Andalusian, Gypsy, and Class Identity in the Contemporary Flamenco Complex". Ethnomusicology. 33 (1). University of Illinois Press: 51–52. doi:10.2307/852169. JSTOR 852169.
- Martin, Juan (2002). Solo Flamenco Guitar. Mel Bay Publications. p. 48. ISBN 978-0-7866-6458-0.
- Martinez, Emma (2011). Flamenco: All You Wanted to Know. Mel Bay. ISBN 9781609744700..
- Martín Salazar, Jorge: Los cantes flamencos, Diputación Provincial de Granada, Granada, 1991 ISBN 84-7807-041-9
- Manuel, Peter. "Flamenco in Focus: An Analysis of a Performance of Soleares." In Analytical Studies in World Music, edited by Michael Tenzer. New York: Oxford University Press, 2006, pp. 92–119.
- Mendoza, Gabriela. "Ser flamenco no es una música, es un estilo de vida". El Diario de Hoy (2011):.
- Ortiz Nuevo, José Luis: Alegato contra la pureza, Libros PM, Barcelona, 1996. ISBN 84-88944-07-1
- Pohren, Donn E. (2005). The Art of Flamenco. Westport, Connecticut: Bold Strummer. ISBN 978-0933224025.
- Real Academia Española. "flamenco, ca". Diccionario de la lengua Española, tricentenary edition. Madrid: Real Academia Español, 2019. (accessed 19 March 2020).
- Ríos Ruiz, Manuel. Ayer y hoy del cante flamenco, Ediciones Istmo, Tres Cantos (Madrid), 1997. ISBN 84-7090-311-X.
- Rossy, Hipólito: Teoría del Cante Jondo, Cresda, Barcelona, 1998. ISBN 84-7056-354-8 (First edition: 1966)
- Ruiz, Ana (2007). Vibrant Andalusia: The Spice of Life in Southern Spain. Algora. ISBN 978-0-87586-540-9.
- Torres Cortés, Norberto. "El compromiso y la generosidad de manolo Sanlúcar ". El Olivo, no. 88 (February 2001, especial "Manolo Sanlúcar").
- Rito y geografía del cante. Serie documental de los años 70 del siglo XX sobre los orígenes, estilos y pervivencia del cante flamenco, con José María Velázquez-Gaztelu.
- Nuestro flamenco: programa de Radio Clásica, con José María Velázquez-Gaztelu.
- Agencia Andaluza para el Desarrollo del Flamenco
- Flamenco Viejo
- Flamenco Olímpico Reportaje Documental
- Flamenco de la A a la Z: breve enciclopedia del flamenco que incluye diccionario en el sitio de Radiolé.
- GRANDE, Félix: Memoria del flamenco, con prólogo de José Manuel Caballero Bonald. Galaxia Gutenberg/Círculo de Lectores, Barcelona, 1991.
  - Texto en PDF.
- Flamenco en Sevilla
- Lafuente Alcántara, Emilio (1825–1868): Cancionero popular. Colección escogida de seguidillas y coplas, 1865.
  - Vol. II: Coplas; texto en Google Books.
  - Sobre Emilio Lafuente Alcántara, hermano de Miguel Lafuente Alcántara, en el sitio Biblioteca Virtual de Arabistas y Africanistas Españoles.
- Universo Lorca | El Concurso del Cante Jondo de 1922. Web dedicada a la vida y obra de Federico García Lorca y su vinculación con Granada. (Diputación de Granada)
- Los Palos del Flamenco | Los Palos del Flamenco. Artículos sobre el origen y evolución del arte flamenco. (Flamencos Online)
