= Córdoba Conservatory =

Coordinates: 37.8831°N 4.7797°W

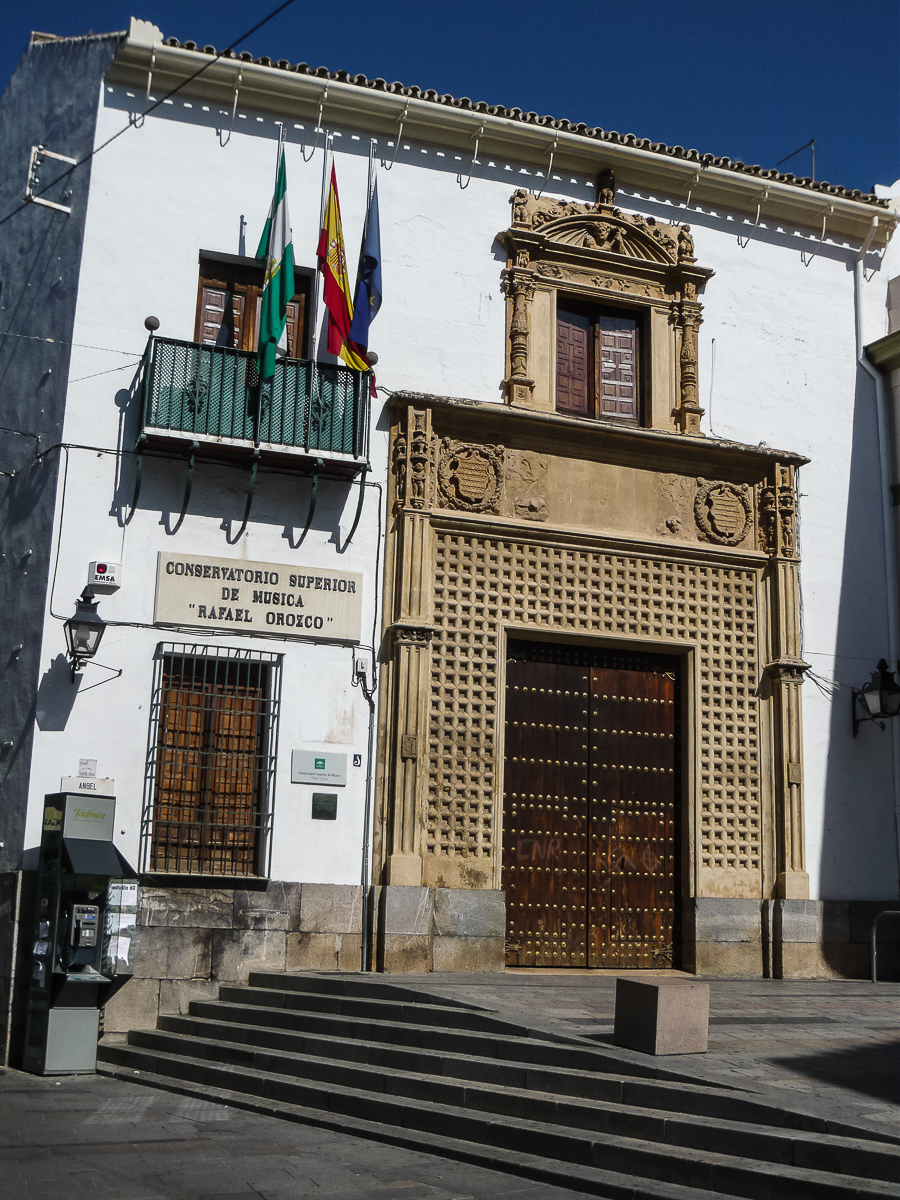
Exterior of the main entrance to the Cordoba Conservatory

The Conservatorio Superior de Música "Rafael Orozco" de Córdoba, better known in English as the Córdoba Conservatory, is a music conservatory in Córdoba, Spain. It was founded by the city council of Cordoba in 1902 as the Música de la Escuela Provincial de Bellas Artes. Composer Cipriano Martínez Rücker served as the school's first director. In 1922 it became the third music school in Spain to achieve a national status as a music conservatory at which point its name was changed to the Conservatorio Oficial de Música. Its name was changed again to Conservatorio Profesional in 1942, and later Conservatorio Superior de Música in 1972. In 1996 the school was re-named again in honor of the Spanish concert pianist Rafael Orozco who had recently died and was an alumnus of the conservatory.

== Bibliography ==
- Ventura, José Manuel (2019). Historia de Córdoba. Editorial Almuzara. ISBN 9788417418137.
- "Rafael Orozco Music Conservatoire of Cordoba". The International Handbook of Universities. Twenty-Second Edition. Palgrave MacMillan. 2010. p. 3522.
