= List of music genres and styles =

This is a list of music genres and styles. Music can be described in terms of many genres and styles. Classifications are often arbitrary, and may be disputed and closely related forms often overlap. Larger genres and styles comprise more specific sub-categories.

== Classical ==
- Andalusian classical music
- Indian classical music
- Korean court music
- Persian classical music
- Kurdish classical music
- Classical Turkish music
- Western classical music
  - Early music
    - Renaissance music (1500–1600)
  - Common practice period (1600–1900)
    - Baroque music (1600–1750)
    - Galant music (1720–1770)
    - Classical period (1750–1820)
    - Romantic music (1780–1910)
  - 20th and 21st-centuries classical music (1900–present):
    - Modernism (1890–1930)
    - Impressionism (1875 or 1890–1925)
    - Neoclassicism (1920–1950)
    - High modernism (1930–present)
    - Postmodern music (1930–present)
    - Experimental music (1950–present)
    - Contemporary classical music (1945 or 1975–present)
    - Minimal music

== Popular ==
=== Avant-garde & Experimental ===
- Acoustic music
- Avant-garde music
- Crossover music
- Danger music
- Drone music
- Electroacoustic
- Eratikore
- Industrial music
- Instrumental
- Lo-fi
- Musical improvisation
- Musique concrète
- Noise
- Outsider music
- Progressive music
- Psychedelic music
- Underground music

=== Blues ===
- African blues
- Anatolian blues
- Blues rock
- Boogie-Woogie
- British blues
- Canadian blues
- Chicago blues
- Classic female blues
- Contemporary R&B
- Country blues
- Delta blues
- Desert blues
- Detroit blues
- Electric blues
- Gospel blues
- Hill country blues
- Hokum blues
- Jump blues
- Kansas City blues
- Louisiana blues
- Memphis blues
- New Orleans blues
- New Zealand blues
- Piedmont blues
- Punk blues
- Rhythm and blues
  - Doo-wop
- Soul blues
- St. Louis blues
- Swamp blues
- Talking blues
- Texas blues
- West Coast blues

=== Country ===
- Alternative country
  - Americana
  - Cosmic country
  - Cowpunk
  - Gothic country
  - Roots rock
- Australian country
  - Bush band
- Bakersfield sound
- Bluegrass
  - Progressive bluegrass
  - Traditional bluegrass
- Blue Yodeling
- Bro-country
- Cajun music
  - Cajun fiddle
- Canadian country
  - Franco-country
- Christian country
- Classic country
- Country and Irish
- Country blues
- Country folk
- Country pop
- Country rap
- Country rock
- Cowboy pop
- Dansband
- Gulf and Western
- Hokum
- Honky tonk
- Lubbock sound
- Nashville sound
  - Countrypolitan
- Neotraditional country
- Old-time
- Outlaw country
- Progressive country
- Regional Mexican
- Rockabilly
  - Psychobilly
    - Gothabilly
- Scrumpy and Western
- Southern rock
- Southern soul
- Sertanejo
- Talking blues
- Truck-driving country
- Western music
  - New Mexico music
  - Red dirt (music)
  - Tejano music
  - Texas country
  - Western swing
- Zydeco

=== Electronic ===
- Ambient
  - Ambient dub
  - Dark ambient
    - Ambient industrial
    - Dungeon synth
    - Isolationism
  - Dreampunk
  - Illbient
  - New-age
    - Neoclassical new-age
    - Space music
- Bass music
  - Dubstep
    - Brostep
  - Moombahcore
    - Post-dubstep
    - Reggaestep
    - Riddim
  - Footwork
  - Future bass
    - Kawaii future bass
  - Jungle terror
  - Midtempo bass
  - Trap (EDM)
  - UK bass
  - Wave
    - Hardwave
- Breakbeat
  - Acid breaks
  - Baltimore club
    - Jersey club
    - Philly club
  - Big beat
  - Breakbeat hardcore
    - Darkcore
    - Hardcore breaks
  - Broken beat
  - Florida breaks
  - Nu skool breaks
  - Progressive breaks
  - Psychedelic breakbeat
- Chill-out
  - Downtempo
  - Psybient
    - Psydub
  - Trip hop
  - Trip rock
- Disco fusion genres
  - Afro/cosmic music
  - Electro-disco
    - Hi-NRG
      - Eurobeat
      - Eurodance
        - Italo dance
    - Italo disco
      - Spacesynth
    - Space disco
  - Eurodisco
  - Nu-disco
  - Post-disco
    - Boogie
    - City pop
    - Pop kreatif
- Drum and bass
  - Darkstep
  - Drumfunk
  - Drumstep
  - Hardstep
  - Intelligent drum and bass
    - Atmospheric drum and bass
  - Jazzstep
  - Jump-up
  - Liquid funk
  - Neurofunk
  - Sambass
  - Techstep
- Dub
  - Dub poetry
- Electronic dance music
  - Christian electronic dance music
- Electronic rock
  - Dance-rock
    - Alternative dance
      - Baggy (Madchester)
      - New rave
    - Dance-punk
  - Electronic pop
    - Dance-pop
      - Freestyle
      - Disco polo
    - Hyperpop
    - Sophisti-pop
    - Synth-pop
      - Electroclash
        - Electropop
    - Wonky pop
  - Indietronica
  - Krautrock
  - New wave
    - Cold wave
    - Dark wave
      - Neoclassical dark wave
      - Neue Deutsche Todeskunst
    - Ethereal wave
      - Nu-gaze
    - Minimal wave
    - Neue Deutsche Welle
    - New romantic
  - Post-rock
  - Space rock
  - Synth-metal
    - Electrogrind
    - Electronicore
  - Synth-punk
- Electronica
  - Folktronica
  - Live electronic (Livetronica)
    - Laptronica
  - Nu jazz (Jazztronica)
  - Progressive electronic
    - Berlin School
    - Kosmische musik
- Ethnic electronica and regional EDM
  - Asian Underground
  - African EDM
    - Afrobeats
      - Azonto
    - Coupé-décalé
    - Kuduro
    - Mahraganat
    - Shangaan electro
  - Budots
  - Changa tuki
  - Dancehall pop
  - Denpa music
  - Guaracha (EDM)
  - Funk carioca
    - Funk melody
    - Funk ostentação
    - Proibidão
    - Rasteirinha
  - Merenhouse
  - Nortec
  - Rabòday
  - Rara tech
  - Russ music
  - Shamstep
  - Tecnocumbia
  - Tribal guarachero
  - Worldbeat
    - Manila sound
- Experimental electronic
  - Black MIDI
  - Deconstructed club
  - Drone
  - Electroacoustic music
    - Acousmatic music
    - Electroacoustic improvisation
    - Musique concrète
    - Soundscape
  - Glitch
  - Microsound
  - Noise music
    - Danger music
    - Japanoise
    - Harsh noise
      - Harsh noise wall
    - Power electronics
      - Death industrial
    - Power noise
  - Plunderphonics
    - Sampledelia
  - Reductionism
    - Lowercase
    - Onkyokei
- Funk fusion genres
  - Funktronica
  - Synth-funk
- Hard dance
  - Hard NRG
  - Hardstyle
    - Dubstyle
    - Euphoric frenchcore
    - Euphoric hardstyle
    - Rawstyle
    - Trapstyle
  - Jumpstyle
  - Lento violento
  - Mákina
- Hardcore
  - Bouncy techno
  - Breakcore
    - Raggacore
  - Digital hardcore
  - Frenchcore
  - Gabber
    - Early hardcore
    - Mainstream hardcore
  - Happy hardcore
    - UK hardcore
  - Industrial hardcore
  - J-core
  - Speedcore
    - Extratone
    - Flashcore
    - Splittercore
- Hauntology
  - Chillwave
  - Hypnagogic pop
  - Synthwave
    - Darksynth
    - Sovietwave
  - Vaporwave
    - Future funk
    - Hardvapour
    - Mallsoft
- Hip-hop fusion genres
  - Afroswing
  - Alternative hip-hop
    - Hipster hop
  - Cloud rap
  - Crunk
    - Crunkcore
    - Snap music
  - Electro
  - Emo rap
  - Glitch hop
  - Instrumental hip-hop
  - Jerk
  - Lofi hip-hop
  - Miami bass
  - Mumble rap
  - Trap
    - Afro trap
    - Drill
      - Brooklyn drill
      - UK drill
    - Latin trap
    - Phonk
      - Drift phonk
      - Brazilian phonk
    - Plugg
    - UK trap
- House music
  - Acid house
  - Afro house
    - Afro tech
    - Amapiano
    - Kidandali
  - Ambient house
  - Balearic beat
  - Ballroom
  - Bass house
  - Brazilian bass
    - Slap house
  - Blog house
  - Chicago hard house
  - Chicago house
  - Deep house
  - Disco house
  - Diva house
    - Hardbag
  - Electro house
    - Big room house
      - Future rave
    - Complextro
    - Dutch house
    - Fidget house
    - Melbourne bounce
  - Electro swing
  - Eurohouse
  - French house
  - Funky house
  - Future house
  - Garage house
  - Ghetto house
    - Ghettotech
    - Juke house
  - Gqom
  - Hip house
    - Electro hop
  - Italo house
  - Jackin house
  - Jazz house
  - Kwaito
  - Latin house
  - Melodic house
  - Microhouse
  - Moombahton
    - Moombahsoul
  - New Jersey sound
  - Outsider house
    - Lo-fi house
  - Progressive house
  - Soulful house
  - Stadium house
  - Tech house
  - Tribal house
  - Tropical house
  - Trouse
  - UK hard house
    - Pumping house
      - Hardbass
    - Scouse house
- Industrial and post-industrial
  - Electro-industrial
    - Dark electro
      - Aggrotech
  - Electronic body music (EBM)
    - Futurepop
    - New beat
  - Industrial hip-hop
  - Industrial metal
    - Cyber metal
    - Neue Deutsche Härte
  - Industrial rock
  - Martial industrial
  - Witch house
- Intelligent dance music (IDM)
  - Algorave
  - Drill 'n' bass
- Jungle
  - Ragga jungle
- R&B and soul fusion genres
  - Alternative R&B
  - Contemporary R&B
  - Neo soul
  - New jack swing
- Techno
  - Acid techno
  - Ambient techno
  - Birmingham sound
  - Bleep techno
  - Detroit techno
  - Dub techno
  - Hard techno
    - Free tekno
      - Jungletek
      - Raggatek
  - Industrial techno
  - Minimal techno
  - Schaffel
  - Toytown techno
- Trance music
  - Acid trance
  - Balearic trance
  - Dream trance
  - Eurotrance
    - Hands up
  - Goa trance
    - Nitzhonot
  - Hard trance
  - Progressive trance
  - Psychedelic trance
    - Dark psytrance
    - Full-on
    - Minimal psytrance
    - Progressive psytrance
    - Suomisaundi
  - Tech trance
  - Uplifting trance
  - Vocal trance
- UK garage
  - 2-step garage
  - Bassline
  - Breakstep
  - Future garage
  - Grime
    - Grindie
  - Speed garage
  - UK funky
    - Funkstep
  - Wonky
- Video game music
  - Chiptune
    - Bitpop
    - Skweee
    - Nintendocore
  - FM synthesis
  - Sequencer music

=== Folk ===
- American folk revival
- Americana
- British folk revival
- Cajun music
- Celtic music
- Chalga
- Corrido
- Creole music
- Filk
- Folk noir
- Folk pop
- Folk rock
  - British folk rock
  - Celtic rock
  - Indie folk
  - Medieval folk rock
  - Progressive folk
  - Psychedelic folk
    - Freak folk
    - New Weird America
  - Folk metal
    - Celtic metal
    - Medieval metal
    - Pagan metal
    - Pirate metal
    - Viking metal
  - Folk punk
    - Anti-folk
    - Celtic punk
    - Cowpunk
    - Gypsy punk
    - Neofolk
    - Scottish Gaelic punk
- Folktronica
- Industrial folk
- Mariachi
  - Ranchera
- Protest song
- Singer-songwriter
  - Nueva canción
- Skiffle
- Sung poetry
- Traditional blues verses

=== Hip-hop ===
- Alternative hip-hop
  - Experimental hip-hop
  - Hipster hop
- Boom bap
- Bounce
- British hip-hop
  - Road rap
- Chopped and screwed
- Chopper
- Christian hip-hop
- Classic hip-hop
- Cloud rap
- Comedy hip-hop
- Crunk
  - Crunkcore
- Digicore
- Drill music
  - Brooklyn drill
  - UK drill
- East Coast hip-hop
- Freestyle rap
- Funk carioca
  - Funk ostentação
- Frat rap
- G-funk
- Hardcore hip-hop
  - Dirty rap
  - Gangsta rap
    - Mafioso rap
  - Horrorcore
  - Memphis rap
- Hyphy
  - Jerkin'
- Internet rap
- Jerk
- Jewish hip-hop
- Instrumental hip-hop
- Latin hip-hop
  - Chicano rap
- Lofi hip-hop
- Miami bass
- Mumble rap
- Nerdcore
  - Chap hop
- Political hip-hop
  - Conscious hip-hop
- Progressive rap
- Slab music
- Snap music
- Southern hip-hop
- Sigilkore
  - Krushclub
- Trap music
  - Latin trap
  - Phonk
  - Plugg
    - Pluggnb
  - Rage
  - Tread rap
- Turntablism
- Underground hip-hop
- West Coast hip-hop
- Country rap
- Electro
- Emo rap
- Hip-hop soul
  - Neo soul
- Hip house
- Hipdut
- Industrial hip-hop
- Jazz rap
- New jack swing
- Pop rap
- Psychedelic rap
- Punk rap
- Ragga hip-hop
- Rap opera
- Rap rock
  - Rap metal
    - Trap metal
  - Rapcore
- Trip hop

=== Jazz ===
- Acid jazz
- Afro-Cuban jazz
- Alt-jazz
- Avant-garde jazz
- Bebop
- Big band
- Boogie-woogie
- Bossa nova
- Brazilian jazz
- British dance band
- Cape jazz
- Chamber jazz
- Continental jazz
- Cool jazz
- Crossover jazz
- Dixieland
- Ethno jazz
- European free jazz
- Free funk
- Free improvisation
- Free jazz
- Gypsy jazz
- Hard bop
- Jazz blues
- Jazz-funk
- Jazz fusion
- Jazz rap
- Jazz rock
- Jazztronica
- Kansas City jazz
- Latin jazz
- Livetronica
- M-base
- Mainstream jazz
- Modal jazz
- Neo-bop jazz
- Neo-swing
- Nu jazz
- Orchestral jazz
- Post-bop
- Progressive jazz
- Punk jazz
- Samba-jazz
- Shibuya-kei
- Ska jazz
- Smooth jazz
- Soul jazz
- Straight-ahead jazz
- Stride jazz
- Swing
- Trad jazz
- Third stream
- Vocal jazz
- West Coast jazz
- Western swing

=== Pop ===
- Adult contemporary
- Adult hits
- Alternative pop
- Ambient pop
- Arabic pop music
- Art pop
- Avant-pop
- Baroque pop
- Beach music
- Bedroom pop
- Brill building
- Britpop
- Bubblegum pop
- C-pop
  - Cantopop
  - Hokkien pop
  - Mandopop
- Canción
- Canzone
- Chalga
- Chamber pop
- Chanson
- Christian pop
- Classic hits
- Classical crossover
- Contemporary hit radio
- Country pop
- Cringe pop
- Dance-pop
- Dark pop
- Disco
  - Eurodisco
- Easy listening
  - Beautiful music
  - Elevator music
  - Exotica
  - Lounge music
  - MOR
- Europop
  - Austropop
  - Eurobeat
  - French pop
  - Italo dance
  - Italo disco
  - Laïkó
  - Nederpop
    - Palingsound
  - Neomelodic music
  - Nordic popular music
  - Russian pop
- Folk pop
- Hyperpop
- Indie pop
  - Twee pop
- Indian pop
- Iranian pop
- J-pop
  - Anime song
  - City pop
  - Shibuya-kei
- Jangle pop
- Jazz pop
- K-pop
  - Korean hip-hop
  - Korean rock
  - T'ong guitar
  - Trot
- Latin ballad
- Latin pop
  - Mexican pop
- New pop
- New Romantic
- Oldies
- Operatic pop
- Orchestral pop
- OPM
  - Pinoy pop
- Pop rap
- Pop rock
  - Pop metal
  - Pop-punk
    - Emo pop
    - Neon pop
  - Power pop
  - Soft rock
  - Surf pop
  - Yacht rock
- Pop soul
- Progressive pop
- Psychedelic pop
- Rebetiko
- Rhythmic adult contemporary
- Rhythmic contemporary
- Rhythmic oldies
- Sapphic pop
- Schlager
- Sophisti-pop
- Space age pop
- Sunshine pop
- Swamp pop
- Synth-pop
  - Electropop
- Teen pop
- Traditional pop
- Turbo-folk
- Turkish pop
- Urban adult contemporary
- Urban contemporary music
- Vispop
- Wonky pop
- Worldbeat
- Yé-yé

=== R&B & Soul ===
- Funk
  - Disco
    - Post-disco
      - Boogie
  - Freestyle
    - Go-go
  - Deep funk
  - Minneapolis Sound
  - New jack swing
  - Psychedelic funk
  - Synth-funk
- Gospel music
  - Southern gospel
  - Urban contemporary gospel
- Rhythm and blues
  - Alternative R&B
  - British rhythm and blues
  - Contemporary R&B
    - RnBass
  - Christian R&B
  - Latin R&B
  - New Orleans rhythm and blues
  - Doo-wop
- Soul
  - Blue-eyed soul
  - British soul
  - Brown-eyed soul
  - Cinematic soul
  - Hip-hop soul
  - Neo soul
  - Northern soul
  - Progressive soul
  - Psychedelic soul
  - Quiet storm
  - Retro-soul
  - Smooth soul
  - Southern soul

=== Rock ===
- Afro rock
  - Afro-punk
- Alternative rock
  - Alternative country
    - Americana music
    - Gothic country
  - Alternative dance
    - New rave
  - Alternative metal
    - Nu metal
  - Alternative pop
  - Britpop
    - Post-Britpop
  - Chamber pop
  - College rock
  - Crank wave
  - Dark cabaret
  - Dolewave
  - Dream pop
    - Shoegaze
      - Blackgaze
      - Grungegaze
      - Nu gaze
      - Shitgaze
      - Witch house
      - Zoomergaze
  - Geek rock
    - Wizard rock
  - Grebo
  - Grunge
    - Bubblegrunge
    - Post-grunge
    - Soft grunge
  - Indie rock
    - Blog rock
    - Dunedin sound
    - Emo
      - Emo pop
      - Emo rap
      - Emo revival
      - Midwest emo
      - Screamo
        - Sass
    - Incelcore
    - Indie folk
    - Indie pop
      - Twee pop
    - Kindie rock
    - Landfill indie
    - Math rock
    - Post-punk revival
    - Slacker rock
    - SoundCloud indie
  - Iranian alternative rock
  - Latin alternative
  - Madchester
    - Baggy
  - Mangue bit
  - New wave of new wave
  - Noise pop
  - Slowcore
- Arena rock
- Beat
  - Freakbeat
  - Italian beat
  - Nederbeat
- Blues rock
  - Boogie rock
  - Punk blues
- Brazilian rock
  - Samba rock
- Christian rock
  - Christian alternative rock
    - Christian ska
  - Christian metal
    - Christian death metal
    - Unblack metal
  - Christian punk
    - Christian hardcore
- Classic rock
  - New wave of classic rock
- Comedy rock
- Country rock
- Deathrock
- Desert rock
- Electronic rock
  - Electroclash
- Experimental rock
  - Art rock
    - Art punk
  - Avant-garde metal
    - Drone metal
  - Industrial rock
    - Industrial metal
      - Neue Deutsche Härte
  - Post-punk
    - Dance-punk
    - Dance-rock
    - Gothic rock
      - Gothic metal
      - Pagan rock
    - No wave
    - Noise rock
  - Post-rock
    - Post-metal
- Folk rock
  - British folk rock
  - Celtic rock
  - Medieval folk rock
  - Sufi rock
  - Trønder rock
  - Folk metal
    - Celtic metal
    - Medieval metal
    - Pagan metal
    - Pirate metal
    - Viking metal
  - Folk punk
    - Celtic punk
    - Cowpunk
    - Gypsy punk
    - Scottish Gaelic punk
- Funk rock
  - Funk metal
  - Minneapolis sound
  - Punk funk
- Garage rock
  - Garage punk
  - Proto-punk
- Glam rock
  - Glam metal
  - Glam punk
- Hard rock
  - Cock rock
- Heartland rock
- Heavy metal
  - Biker metal
  - Black metal
    - Dungeon synth
    - National Socialist black metal
    - Symphonic black metal
  - Death metal
    - Blackened death metal
    - Brutal death metal
    - Deathgrind
    - Death 'n' roll
    - Melodic death metal
    - Technical death metal
  - Doom metal
    - Death-doom
    - Funeral doom
  - Extreme metal
  - Grindcore
  - Metalcore
  - Neoclassical metal
  - Power metal
  - Proto-metal
  - Sludge metal
  - Speed metal
  - Symphonic metal
  - Thrash metal
    - Crossover thrash
    - Groove metal
- Iranian rock
- Instrumental rock
- Japanese rock
  - Kawaii metal
- Jazz fusion
  - Punk jazz
  - Jazz rock
- Latin rock
  - Chicano rock
  - Latin metal
  - Latino punk
  - Rock en español
- Mangue bit
- Modern rock
- New wave
  - Cold wave
  - Dark wave
    - Ethereal wave
  - Minimal wave
  - Mod revival
  - Sophisti-pop
  - Synth-pop
  - 2-Tone
- Occult rock
- Pop rock
  - Baroque pop
    - Cello rock
  - Jangle pop
  - Pop metal
  - Pop-punk
  - Power pop
  - Soft rock
    - Tropical rock
    - Yacht rock
- Progressive rock
  - Art rock
  - Canterbury scene
  - Flamenco rock
  - Krautrock
    - New musick
  - Neo-prog
  - Post-progressive
  - Progressive metal
    - Djent
  - Progressive pop
  - Proto-prog
  - Space rock
  - Zeuhl
- Psychedelic rock
  - Acid rock
  - Anatolian rock
  - Neo-psychedelia
  - Paisley Underground
  - Raga rock
  - Stoner rock
- Pub rock (Australia)
- Pub rock (United Kingdom)
- Punk rock
  - Anarcho punk
    - Crust punk
      - D-beat
  - Egg punk
  - Hardcore punk
    - Bandana thrash
    - Beatdown hardcore
    - Bent edge
    - Crunkcore
    - Digital hardcore
    - Electronicore
    - Grindcore
      - Goregrind
      - Pornogrind
    - Krishnacore
    - Metalcore
      - Deathcore
      - Mathcore
      - Nintendocore
      - Melodic metalcore
      - Progressive metalcore
      - Risecore
    - Melodic hardcore
    - Noisecore
    - Positive hardcore
    - Post-hardcore
    - Queercore
    - Taqwacore
    - Thrashcore
    - Tough guy hardcore
    - Powerviolence
    - Riot grrrl
    - Shaman punk
    - Skate punk
    - Street punk
  - Horror punk
  - Nazi punk
  - Oi!
  - Punk pathetique
  - Trallpunk
- Rap rock
  - Punk rap
  - Rap metal
- Reggae rock
  - Reggae punk
    - Ska punk
- Rock and roll
  - Rockabilly
    - Gothabilly
    - Psychobilly
- Rock kapak
- Roots rock
- Southern rock
- Swamp rock
- Surf rock
- Viking rock
- Visual kei
  - Nagoya kei
- Wagnerian rock
- Worldbeat
- Slam Metal

== Regional ==
=== African ===
- African heavy metal
- African hip-hop
- African popular music
- Afro pop
- Afrobeat
- Afrobeats
- Afro house
- Amapiano
- Apala
- Arabesque
- Afro tech
- Benga
- Bikutsi
- Bongo flava
- Boomba
- Bubu music
- Cape jazz
- Chaabi
- Chalga
- Chaoui music
- Chimurenga
- Congolese rumba
- Coupé-Décalé
- Fuji music
- Genge
- Gnawa
- Gqom
- Gumbe
- Highlife
- Hiplife
- Igbo highlife
- Igbo rap
- Ikorodo
- Ikwokirikwo
- Isicathamiya
- Jit
- Jùjú
- Kadongo Kamu
- Kizomba
- Kuduro
- Kwaito
- Kwela
- Lingala music
- Makossa
- Maloya
- Ma'luf
- Marabi
- Marrabenta
- Maskandi
- Mbalax
- Mbaqanga
- Mbube
- Morna
- Music of Egypt
- Music of Nigeria
- Ndombolo
- Owerri Bongo
- Ojapiano
- Palm-wine
- Raï
- Rumba
- Sakara
- Sega
- Seggae
- Semba
- Shangaan electro
- Soukous
  - Kwassa kwassa
- Taarab
- Zamrock
- Zouglou

=== Antarctica ===
- Nunatak (band)

=== Asian ===
Central Asian

- Shashmaqam
- Pashto music
- Kazakh folk music
- Kyrgyz folk music
- Mongolian folk music
  - Tuvan throat singing
- Tajik folk music

East Asian

Chinese:

- C-pop
  - Cantopop
  - Hokkien pop
  - Mandopop
- Chinese hip-hop
- Chinese folk music
- Chinese rock

Hong Kong, China:

- Hong Kong English pop

Taiwanese:

- Taiwanese hip-hop
- Taiwanese pop
- Taiwanese rock

Japanese:

- Anime song
- Enka
- J-pop
- Japanese hip-hop
- Japanese jazz
- Japanese rock
- Kayōkyoku

Korean:

- K-pop
- Korean folk music
- Korean hip-hop
- Korean rock
- Trot

South Asian

- Asian Underground
- Baul
- Bhangra
- Bhawaiya
- Dappankuthu
- Dohori
- Filmi
- Indian classical
  - Carnatic
  - Hindustani classical
- Indian jazz
- Indian pop
- Indian rock
  - Raga rock
- Lavani
- Morlam
- Ragini
- Sufi rock

Sri Lankan:

- Baila
- Sri Lankan hip-hop

Southeast Asian

Malaysian:

- Malaysian hip-hop
- Malaysian pop
- Malaysian rock

Indonesian:

- Gamelan
- Dangdut
- Indo pop
  - Pop Kreatif
  - Sundanese pop
- Keroncong

Thai:

- Luk thung
  - Luk krung
- Thai pop
  - Thai string pop

Filipino:

- Manila sound
  - Original Pilipino
- Pinoy pop
- Pinoy rock

Lao:

- L-pop
- Mor lam

Vietnamese:

- V-pop

=== Middle Eastern ===
- Arabic music
  - Arabic pop music
- Fann at-Tanbura
- Fijiri
- Khaliji
- Liwa
- Kurdish folk
  - Hayran
  - Dengbêj
  - Kurdish maqam
- Music of Israel
- Persian traditional music
- Sawt
- Music of Turkey
  - Turkish folk music
    - Gypsy music

=== Australasia & Oceania ===
- Australian folk music
- Australian hip-hop
- Indigenous music of Australia
- Music of Hawaii
- Music of New Zealand
  - Māori music
    - Kapa haka
- Music of Polynesia
- Music of Samoa

=== European ===
Balkan States

- Balkan music
  - Balkan brass
  - Balkan folk music
  - Music of Albania
  - Music of Bosnia and Herzegovina
    - Sevdalinka
  - Music of Bulgaria
  - Music of Croatia
  - Music of Cyprus
  - Music of Greece
  - Music of Hungary
  - Music of Kosovo
  - Music of Montenegro
  - Music of Moldova
  - Music of North Macedonia
  - Music of Romania
    - Romani music
      - Manele
      - Gypsy music
  - Music of Serbia
  - Music of Slovenia

Caucasus

- Music of Armenia
- Music of Azerbaijan
- Music of Georgia (country)

Baltic States

- Lithuanian folk music
- Music of Estonia
- Music of Latvia

West Slavic states

- Music of the Czech Republic
  - Polka
- Music of Poland
  - Disco polo
  - Polka
- Music of Slovakia

Germanic States

- Music of Austria
  - Viennese waltz
  - Yodeling
- Music of Germany
- Music of Liechtenstein
- Music of Switzerland
  - Yodeling

Nordic/Scandinavian States

- Nordic folk music
  - Music of Denmark
    - Danish traditional music
  - Music of Finland
    - Jenkka
    - Rautalanka (Finnish surf-rock)
  - Music of Iceland
  - Music of Norway
  - Music of Sweden
  - Music of the Faroe Islands
  - Traditional Nordic dance music
  - Viking metal

East Slavic States

- Klezmer
- Music of Belarus
- Music of Moldova
- Music of Russia
  - Music of Buryatia
  - Russian folk music
- Music of Ukraine
- Music of Yugoslavia

Western European

- Music of Andorra
- Music of Belgium
  - Belgian hardcore techno
  - Belgian hip-hop
  - Belgian jazz
  - Belgian rock
- Music of France
  - French classical music
  - French electronic music
  - French folk music
    - Bal-musette
    - Chanson réaliste
  - French hip-hop
  - French house
  - French jazz
  - French pop music
- Music of Ireland
  - Celtic music
- Music of Italy
  - Italian classical music
  - Italian folk music
  - Italian hip-hop
  - Italian jazz
  - Italian popular music
- Music of Luxembourg
- Music of Malta
- Music of Monaco
- Music of the Netherlands
- Music of Portugal
  - Portuguese folk music
    - Chula
    - Desgarrada
    - Fado
      - Coimbra fado
    - Pimba
  - Portuguese rock
- Music of Spain
  - Spanish folk music
    - Chirigota
    - Copla
    - Cuplé
    - Ensalada
    - Fandango
    - Flamenco
      - Alegrías
      - Bulerías
      - Farruca
      - Garrotín
      - Rumba
      - Soleá
      - Tango
      - Tientos
      - Zambra
    - Jota
    - Muiñeira
    - Pasacalle
    - Pasodoble
    - Sardana
    - Seguidilla
    - Sevillanas
    - Tonadilla
    - Zortziko
  - Spanish jazz
  - Spanish rock
- Music of the United Kingdom
  - Britpop
  - English folk music
  - Music of Scotland
  - Music of Wales

=== Latin & South American ===
Brazilian

- Axé
- Brazilian rock
- Brega
  - Tecnobrega
- Choro
- Forró
- Frevo
- Funk carioca
- Lambada
  - Zouk-Lambada
- Maracatu
- Música popular brasileira
  - Tropicalia
- Música sertaneja
- Samba
  - Pagode
  - Samba rock

Caribbean

- Aguinaldo
- Baithak Gana
- Bomba
- Bouyon
- Cadence-lypso
- Calypso
- Cha-cha-chá
- Chutney
  - Chutney soca
  - Chutney parang
- Compas
- Dancehall
- Mambo
- Mento
- Merengue
- Méringue
- Mozambique
- Pichakaree
- Plena
- Punta
- Punta rock
- Rasin
- Reggae
  - Dub
  - Lovers rock
  - Ragga
  - Reggae fusion
  - Ragga jungle
    - Reggae rock
  - Reggaeton
    - Alternative reggaeton
    - Moombahton
  - Roots reggae
- Rocksteady
- Rumba
- Salsa
- Ska
  - Ska punk
  - Two-tone
- Soca
  - Power soca
- Son cubano
- Songo
- Timba
- Twoubadou
- Zouk

Hispanic

- Boogaloo
- Bullerengue
- Flamenco
  - Cantes de ida y vuelta
  - Fandangos
  - Soleá
    - Alegrías
    - Bulerías
    - Peteneras
  - Tango
  - Toná
    - Martinetes
    - Tonás
- Grupera
- Hispanic rhythmic
- Latin Christian
- Latin pop
  - Latin ballad
- Latin rock
  - Latin alternative
  - Rock en Español
- Latin jazz
  - Afro-Cuban jazz
  - Bossa nova
- Mariachi
- Ranchera
- Reggaeton
  - Latin trap
- Regional Mexican
  - Banda
  - Norteño
- Tango
- Tropical
  - Bachata
  - Bolero
  - Criolla
  - Cumbia
    - Chicha
    - Porro
  - Guajira
  - Mambo
  - Merengue
  - Música popular (Colombia)
  - Rumba
  - Salsa
    - Salsa romántica
  - Son
  - Tejano
  - Timba
  - Tropipop
  - Urbano music
  - Vallenato

=== North American ===
- American rock
- Canadian folk music
- Indigenous music of North America
- Inuit music
  - Music of Alaska
  - Indigenous music of Canada
  - Music of Greenland
- Ragtime
  - Cakewalk
  - Classic rag
  - Folk ragtime
  - Honky-tonk piano
  - Novelty piano
  - Stomp
  - Stride piano
- Swing music

== Religious ==
- Buddhist
- Christian
- Hindu
- Islamic
- Jewish
- Native American
- Neopagan
- Rastafarian
- Shinto
- Sikh
- Taoist
- Zoroastrian

== Traditional folk ==
  - American patriotic music
  - Christmas music
  - Dance music
  - Fado
  - Huayno
  - Mele
  - Polka
  - Ragtime
  - Son mexicano
  - Música criolla

== Other ==
- A cappella
  - Barbershop music
  - Collegiate a cappella
- Ballroom dance music: pasodoble, cha cha cha and others
  - Vogue (dance)
- Bedroom production
- Children's music
- Computer music
  - Hyperpop
  - Internet meme
- Drug use in music
- Incidental music or music for stage and screen: music written for the score of a film, play, musicals, or other spheres, such as filmi, video game music, music hall songs and showtunes and others
- Independent music
  - Multi-instrumentalist
    - Bassist
    - Drummer
      - Percussion
        - Found object (music)
    - Guitarist
    - Pianist
      - Keyboardist
  - One-man band
- LGBT music
- Patriotic music: military music, marches, national anthems, War songs and related compositions
  - Martial industrial
- Regional and national music with no significant commercial impact abroad, except when it is a version of an international genre, such as: traditional music, oral traditions, sea shanties, work songs, nursery rhymes, Arabesque and indigenous music. In North America and Western Europe, regional and national genres that are not from the Western world are sometimes classified as world music.
- Nerd music
- Theatre music
- Virtuoso
- Yodeling

These categories are not exhaustive. A music platform, Gracenote, listed more than 2000 music genres (included by those created by ordinary music lovers, who are not involved within the music industry, these being said to be part of a 'folksonomy', i.e. a taxonomy created by non-experts). Most of these genres were created by music labels to target new audiences, however classification is useful to find music and distribute it.

== See also ==
- Lists of music genres

== Bibliography ==
- Borthwick, Stuart, & Moy, Ron (2004) Popular Music Genres: An Introduction. Edinburgh: Edinburgh University Press.
- Fabbri, Franco (1982) A Theory of Popular Music Genres: Two Applications. In Popular Music Perspectives, edited by David Horn and Philip Tagg, 52–81. Göteborg and Exeter: A. Wheaton & Co., Ltd.
- Frith, Simon (1996) Performing Rites: On the Value of Popular Music. Cambridge, Massachusetts: Harvard University Press.
- Holt, Fabian (2007) Genre in Popular Music. Chicago: University of Chicago Press.
- Negus, Keith (1999) Music Genres and Corporate Cultures. London and New York: Routledge.
