= Rondeña =

Musical form of flamenco

The rondeña is a palo or musical form of flamenco associated with Ronda and the Province of Málaga in Andalusia, southern Spain. It belongs to the broad family of Málaga fandangos and is usually classified among the cantes de Málaga, together with styles such as the malagueña, jabera, jabegote and verdiales.

The term has two related but distinct uses in flamenco. In cante, it refers to a song style traditionally linked to the fandango tradition of Málaga and to the mountainous area around Ronda. In toque, it also refers to an important solo-guitar form, especially the concert rondeña associated with Ramón Montoya. This guitar form is often played in an altered tuning and has become one of the classic pieces of the solo flamenco guitar repertory.

Like several other flamenco forms from Málaga, the rondeña is generally understood as older than flamenco in its fully developed nineteenth-century form. Its roots lie in regional fandango practice, especially in the older abandolao and verdiales traditions that were gradually stylized into the flamenco repertory.

== Etymology ==
The name rondeña is commonly connected with the town of Ronda, in the province of Málaga. Some writers have also related the word to the Spanish verb rondar, meaning to go round or to serenade, especially in the older custom of young men singing beneath a woman's window. Flamenco writers differ on the relative importance of these explanations. The usual flamenco interpretation is that the style is linked to Ronda or to the wider Serranía de Ronda, although the association with rondas or serenading has also been noted in flamenco literature.

The feminine form rondeña in Spanish can also mean a woman from Ronda, or something characteristic of Ronda. In the musical sense, however, it refers to a genre rather than to a person.

== Historical background ==
=== Origins in the fandango malagueño ===
The rondeña is generally described as a local or regional fandango from Málaga. In flamenco classifications it is often connected with the bandolá or abandolao family, a group of Málaga-related styles derived from the rhythmic and melodic world of verdiales. In this view, the rondeña represents one of the points at which popular Andalusian fandango practice was absorbed into professional flamenco.

The older fandangos of Málaga were danceable and often accompanied by popular instrumental groups. As these forms entered the flamenco environment of the nineteenth century, they could become slower, more ornamented, more individualized and more suitable for solo singing with guitar. The rondeña is one of the forms in which this transition from popular fandango to flamenco cante can be observed.

Several flamenco writers have treated the rondeña as one of the oldest known fandango-derived styles. This claim should be understood in a relative sense: it does not mean that the modern flamenco rondeña existed unchanged from an ancient period, but that the style preserves features of an older fandango tradition that was later incorporated into flamenco.

=== Nineteenth-century diffusion ===
During the nineteenth century, rondeñas and other Andalusian fandango styles circulated widely beyond their local origins. They were sung in popular settings, adapted by professional performers, and referred to by writers who described Andalusian music and dance. Because of this wide circulation, the history of the rondeña is not limited to Ronda itself. It belongs to a larger musical geography that includes the town of Ronda, the Serranía de Ronda, the province of Málaga, and the Andalusian fandango tradition more generally.

Some authors therefore treat the style as a specifically Ronda-related cante, while others emphasize its place within the Málaga fandango family as a whole. The two interpretations are not necessarily contradictory, since many flamenco styles have both a local association and a broader musical classification.

== Musical characteristics ==
=== Cante ===
As a sung form, the rondeña is usually described as a fandango-derived cante. Its melodic character is related to the Málaga fandango family, and its performance often has a free or flexible rhythmic treatment. In some descriptions it is said to be sung ad libitum or sin compás, meaning without a strict recurring flamenco cycle. In other contexts, especially when connected with the abandolao family, it may be treated with an underlying triple or fandango-like rhythmic feel.

The style is traditionally associated with rural imagery and with the landscape of the Serranía de Ronda. Lyrics may refer to the countryside, mountains, love, longing, local identity or the act of singing rondeñas itself. As in many flamenco songs, the poetic text is normally brief and self-contained.

A common verse form is the four-line octosyllabic stanza, often expanded in performance to five musical lines through the repetition of one of the lines, commonly the second. This procedure is typical of several fandango-related flamenco styles: the written stanza may have four poetic lines, while the sung realization creates a five-phrase musical structure.

Compared with some older descriptions of the style, modern performances are often said to be slower and less densely melismatic. This reflects a broader historical process in which many local fandango styles were stylized for recital, recording and concert presentation.

=== Compás and rhythm ===
The rhythmic status of the rondeña is one of the reasons the term can be confusing. In cante, the rondeña may be treated as relatively free, especially in comparison with flamenco styles governed by a strict twelve-beat cycle such as soleá or bulerías. Yet it is also historically related to the abandolao family, whose members have a recognizable rhythmic drive derived from fandango and verdiales practice.

For this reason, sources may describe the rondeña either as a free cante or as a form with an abandolao background. These descriptions are not necessarily contradictory. They may refer to different stages of the style, different performance contexts, or the difference between an underlying fandango origin and a later flamenco recital style.

=== Toque ===
In flamenco guitar, rondeña has a special meaning. It refers not only to accompaniment for the sung rondeña, but also to an independent solo-guitar form. The most famous model is associated with Ramón Montoya, who helped establish the rondeña as a concert guitar piece.

The solo-guitar rondeña is often played in an altered tuning. A common tuning lowers the sixth string from E to D and the third string from G to F-sharp, producing the tuning D–A–D–F♯–B–E from the sixth to the first string. This tuning gives the guitar a resonant sonority with open strings and characteristic pedal tones.

The guitar rondeña is typically more harmonically exploratory than many straightforward dance-accompaniment forms. Its use of altered tuning encourages drones, open-string resonance, unusual chord shapes and a characteristic ambiguity between flamenco modality and major-key sonorities. It is often performed freely, with passages of lyrical melody, arpeggiation, tremolo, rasgueado and falsetas of variable length.

Although the concert-guitar rondeña is historically connected with the sung palo, it has developed a partly independent identity. In modern flamenco usage, a guitarist may speak of playing por rondeña in reference to the tuning, tonal world and solo form associated with Montoya, rather than to the direct accompaniment of sung rondeñas.

== Relationship to other palos ==
The rondeña belongs to the complex family of Andalusian fandango-derived styles. Its closest relatives are usually considered to be the malagueña, verdiales, jabera and jabegote. It is also connected more broadly with the cantes abandolaos, a group of styles that retain features of older fandango rhythm and accompaniment.

The rondeña should not be confused with the taranta or taranto, although guitarists and dancers have sometimes drawn comparisons between them. The taranta and taranto belong to the mining-song family of eastern Andalusia and Murcia, while the rondeña is associated with Málaga and Ronda. However, both the rondeña guitar style and the free cantes of the Levante family can share an expansive, non-metrical character in performance.

The rondeña also has affinities with the granaína and media granaína, since all these styles belong to the wider fandango world and may be sung or played with a free rhythmic treatment. Nevertheless, the melodic profiles, local associations and guitar idioms are distinct.

== Dance ==
The rondeña has been used for dance, though it is less central to the modern dance repertory than forms such as soleá, alegrías, tangos or bulerías. Older descriptions connect the dance with a vigorous or open rhythmic character. In some cases dancers have adapted rhythmic procedures from related forms, including the taranto, in order to give the rondeña a more defined choreographic structure.

Because the sung rondeña can be rhythmically free, choreographing it requires a different approach from choreographing a strict-compás form. Dancers may emphasize atmosphere, marking, braceo, turns and dramatic phrasing rather than continuous footwork locked to a fixed cycle. In staged flamenco, however, the form may be regularized or hybridized to make it more suitable for dance.

== Lyrics ==
Rondeña lyrics often follow the concise style of Andalusian folk and flamenco poetry. They may refer to singing, love, the countryside, local geography or emotional states. The following examples are traditional coplas often associated with rondeñas:

Rondeñas vienen cantando,
sobre la cama me siento,
porque, en oyendo rondeñas,
se me alegra el pensamiento.

Las rondeñas malagueñas
cántamelas, primo mío,
que al son de las malagueñas
me voy quedando dormío.

As in other flamenco styles, the poetic text is only one element of performance. The expressive identity of the cante depends equally on melodic treatment, ornamentation, vocal timbre, phrasing and the relationship between singer and guitarist.

== Notable performers ==
Early guitar figures associated with the rondeña include Miguel Borrull and, above all, Ramón Montoya, whose concert rondeña became a model for later guitarists. Montoya's contribution is especially important because it helped elevate the flamenco guitar from an accompanying instrument to a solo concert instrument. His rondeña became one of the emblematic examples of this transformation.

In the twentieth century, guitarists such as Sabicas, Mario Escudero, Manolo Sanlúcar, Paco de Lucía, Serranito, Gerardo Núñez and Enrique de Melchor contributed to the development of solo flamenco guitar, including forms related to rondeña or to the free guitar tradition.

Singers associated in flamenco literature with rondeñas or with the Málaga repertory include Fosforito, Antonio de Canillas, Alfredo Arrebola, Jacinto Almadén, Juan de la Loma, Enrique Orozco, Antonio Ranchal, Rafael Romero, José Menese and Cándido de Málaga.

== In modern flamenco ==
In contemporary flamenco, the rondeña occupies a somewhat specialized place. It is respected as a traditional palo, but it is not among the most frequently performed forms in popular flamenco concerts. Its greatest visibility is arguably in the guitar repertory, where the Montoya-derived solo rondeña remains a canonical form studied by advanced guitarists.

Modern performers may approach the rondeña in several ways. A singer may treat it as a Málaga-style cante, emphasizing its fandango lineage. A guitarist may perform a solo por rondeña in altered tuning. A choreographer may use the style as a lyrical or dramatic framework. Contemporary composers may also invoke the rondeña for its color, its association with Ronda and Málaga, or its open, resonant guitar idiom.

The coexistence of these approaches explains why the word rondeña can refer to more than one practical musical object. In flamenco scholarship, the term normally refers to the cante within the Málaga family. In guitar pedagogy, it often refers to the solo guitar form and tuning established by Ramón Montoya.

== See also ==
- Palo (flamenco)
- Fandango
- Fandango malagueño
- Cantes de Málaga
- Verdiales
- Malagueña (flamenco style)
- Flamenco guitar
- Ramón Montoya
- Ronda
