= Verdiales =

Folk and flamenco music style from Málaga, Spain

Verdiales are a traditional music, song and dance form from the Province of Málaga in Andalusia, southern Spain. They are closely related to the fandango and are often described as one of the oldest surviving forms of the Málaga fandango tradition. In flamenco terminology, verdiales are commonly treated as a palo associated with the family of cantes de Málaga, although they also retain a strong identity as a rural folk practice independent of professional flamenco.

Verdiales are traditionally performed by ensembles known as pandas de verdiales or pandas de fiesteros. A typical panda includes singers, dancers and instrumentalists playing violin, guitars, tambourine or frame drum, small cymbals, castanets and, in some styles, lute or bandurria. The music is festive, danceable and strongly associated with rural communities in the mountains and villages around Málaga, especially the Montes de Málaga, Almogía, Comares, Álora, Totalán, Cártama, Casabermeja and other localities of the province.

The Fiesta de Verdiales was inscribed in 2010 in the General Catalogue of Andalusian Historical Heritage as a Bien de Interés Cultural, under the category of an activity of ethnological interest. The official Andalusian decree describes the fiesta as part of the living and dynamic intangible heritage of Málaga and Andalusia, with oral transmission and the pandas as central elements of the tradition.

== Etymology ==
The word verdiales is usually connected with the olive-growing landscape of Málaga. One common explanation relates the name to a local variety of olive or to the green appearance of olives in the region, from Spanish verde, meaning green. The term also refers to rural districts and settlements associated with the tradition, especially the area of Los Verdiales, north of the city of Málaga.

In musical usage, verdiales is both plural and collective. It may refer to the genre as a whole, to particular songs and dances, or to the festive event in which they are performed. The expression Fiesta de Verdiales designates not only a musical performance but a larger social event involving singing, dancing, costume, ritualized competition, local identity and communal celebration.

== Origins and historical background ==
Verdiales are generally considered a pre-flamenco or proto-flamenco form of the Andalusian fandango. Their roots are associated with rural Málaga, particularly the mountainous and agricultural areas surrounding the city. Unlike some flamenco styles that developed mainly in urban professional contexts such as cafés cantantes, verdiales have remained closely tied to local fiestas, village gatherings, family events and seasonal celebrations.

The style is usually placed within the larger family of Andalusian fandangos. In this respect, verdiales are related to other Málaga-derived flamenco forms such as the malagueña, Rondeña, jabera and jabegote. However, verdiales preserve a more collective and festive character than many of the later flamenco cantes derived from fandango. Whereas the malagueña became increasingly stylized as a free, solo cante, verdiales retained a danceable rhythm, ensemble performance and strong connection to communal celebration.

Flamenco writers often describe the verdiales as among the oldest preserved forms of the Málaga fandango. This does not mean that modern verdiales have remained unchanged, but that the style preserves features associated with older rural fandango practice: group performance, dance, violin-led melody, strong rhythmic continuity and festive social function.

== Relationship with flamenco ==
Verdiales occupy an ambiguous position between folk music and flamenco. They are included in many flamenco classifications because of their relation to the fandango and to the Málaga family of cantes. At the same time, they are not simply a professional flamenco form. They remain a living local tradition practiced by organized pandas, transmitted through families and communities, and performed in fiestas that are not limited to flamenco stages.

The process by which verdiales entered the flamenco orbit is sometimes described as aflamencamiento, or flamencoization. Through this process, a rural fandango form was gradually adopted, adapted and interpreted by flamenco singers and guitarists. In flamenco performance, verdiales may be presented as fandangos abandolaos, that is, as part of the rhythmic fandango family of Málaga. In local fiestas, however, the emphasis is often less on individual virtuosity and more on collective participation, energy and continuity of tradition.

For this reason, verdiales are sometimes described as a bridge between rural Andalusian folklore and flamenco. They share melodic, harmonic and poetic elements with flamenco, but their social setting, instrumentation and festive organization distinguish them from the solo recital forms most often associated with flamenco performance.

== Musical characteristics ==
=== Form and rhythm ===
Verdiales are based on the fandango and normally have a lively triple or compound-meter feel. In flamenco terminology, they are often grouped with the cantes abandolaos, a family of fandango-derived styles from Málaga and eastern Andalusia characterized by a regular, danceable rhythmic accompaniment.

Older descriptions sometimes compare the phrasing of verdiales with the twelve-count structure familiar from styles such as soleá and bulerías. However, verdiales should not be understood as having the same compás as those palos. Their rhythmic character is closer to the fandango and abandolao world: fast, repetitive, circular and suitable for dance. The pulse is maintained by guitars, tambourine, cymbals, castanets and the collective energy of the panda.

The performance is usually continuous. Singers may take turns delivering short coplas while the instrumentalists maintain the rhythmic and harmonic framework. Dancers enter and leave the central space, and the group sustains the music through repeated melodic and rhythmic patterns.

=== Melody and harmony ===
The melody of verdiales is closely connected with the Andalusian fandango tradition. It often moves within the flamenco modal environment associated with the Phrygian or Andalusian cadence, though local practice varies according to style and ensemble. The violin frequently carries a prominent melodic role, sometimes doubling, anticipating or responding to the sung line.

The guitar accompaniment may use characteristic flamenco harmonic patterns, especially those associated with the fandango family. In practical flamenco settings, verdiales are often associated with E Phrygian sonorities, although other tonal centers and local variants are possible. The harmonic language is generally simpler and more repetitive than in highly developed solo flamenco forms, because the main purpose is to sustain singing and dancing in a festive context.

=== Lyrics ===
The lyrics of verdiales are usually short coplas, often with rural, festive, religious, amorous or local themes. They may refer to villages, patron saints, agricultural life, love, rivalry, pride in a local style, or the act of singing and dancing itself. As with other fandango-related forms, the poetic stanza is brief, but the musical performance can expand it through repetition, melodic elaboration and alternation between singers.

The themes of the lyrics reflect the communal nature of the tradition. Verdiales are not only songs for listening; they are part of a social event in which the performers, dancers and audience belong to a shared festive environment.

== Instruments and ensemble ==
A verdiales ensemble is called a panda. The exact instrumentation varies according to locality and style, but it commonly includes:

- one or more violins;
- two or more guitars;
- a tambourine or frame drum, often called pandero;
- small cymbals, known as platillos;
- castanets, or palillos;
- singers and dancers;
- sometimes bandurria, lute or other plucked instruments.

The violin is one of the most distinctive elements of verdiales. While the flamenco guitar is central to many flamenco palos, the violin gives verdiales a sound closer to older rural string-band traditions. The instrument often leads the melodic line and helps define the style of the panda.

The tambourine and cymbals provide rhythmic drive. Their sound contributes to the bright, insistent texture of the fiesta. Castanets are used both by dancers and by members of the group, reinforcing the pulse and visual character of the performance.

== The panda de verdiales ==
The panda de verdiales is more than a band in the modern concert sense. It is a social unit that brings together musicians, singers and dancers around a shared local tradition. Members of a panda are often called fiesteros. The group is usually led by a figure known as the alcalde or mayor, who directs the performance and may carry a decorated baton or staff.

Another important figure is the abanderado or flag-bearer, who carries and waves the flag of the panda. The flag, the mayor's baton, the decorated hat and the arrangement of the performers are part of the visual identity of the fiesta. The panda therefore combines musical, choreographic and ceremonial elements.

The performance of a panda may involve friendly rivalry with other groups. These encounters are sometimes described as choques or luchas de fiesta, in which different pandas display their strength, repertory, dance, singing and endurance. Such contests are central to the festive and competitive dimension of verdiales.

== Dance ==
Dance is an essential part of verdiales. The dance is normally performed by couples or small groups, with steps and gestures that reflect the music's fast triple rhythm. It is festive rather than solemn, and its purpose is closely tied to celebration, courtship, communal display and local identity.

Unlike some staged flamenco dances, verdiales dance is traditionally embedded in a participatory fiesta. The dancers are not always separated from the musicians and audience in the manner of a theatre performance. Instead, dancing may take place within or around the circle of the panda, creating a continuous interaction between musicians, singers, dancers and spectators.

Different styles of verdiales have different dance characteristics. The Comares style, for example, is often described as especially rich or elaborate in its dance possibilities, while other styles emphasize speed, drive or older musical features.

== Styles ==
Traditional verdiales are usually divided into three principal styles: Montes, Almogía and Comares. These styles are associated with different geographical areas, instrumentation, tempo, melodic character and dance practice.

=== Montes style ===
The Montes style is associated with the Montes de Málaga, the hilly area north of the city of Málaga. It is often described as the oldest or most archaic of the three principal styles. In cultural heritage descriptions, it is closely linked to the rural settlements, roads, inns, farms and wine-producing areas of the Montes.

The Montes style is generally considered forceful and direct. Its performance emphasizes continuity, rhythmic drive and the collective strength of the panda. Because of its association with the Montes de Málaga, it is sometimes treated as the most emblematic style of the tradition.

=== Almogía style ===
The Almogía style is associated with the municipality of Almogía and nearby areas. It is commonly described as the fastest of the three principal styles. Its tempo and rhythmic energy make it especially lively and immediately recognizable.

The Almogía style has a wide geographical presence within the province of Málaga. Its speed and brightness have made it one of the most prominent styles in competitions and public festivals.

=== Comares style ===
The Comares style is associated with Comares and the eastern part of the verdiales area. It is often described as musically rich and danceable, with distinctive melodic and choreographic features.

In comparison with the Montes and Almogía styles, Comares may allow greater melodic variety and more elaborate dance gestures. It is sometimes regarded as especially graceful in its choreographic aspect.

== Costume and visual elements ==
Verdiales are visually recognizable because of their festive dress and ornamentation. One of the most characteristic elements is the decorated hat, often adorned with flowers, ribbons, small mirrors, beads or other bright objects. The hat is not merely decorative; it is part of the symbolic identity of the fiesta and of the panda.

Costumes vary according to group and occasion. Performers may wear traditional rural clothing, sashes, ribbons or other ornaments. The flag of the panda, the mayor's baton and the decorated instruments contribute to the ritual and visual character of the performance.

The visual dimension of verdiales is important because the tradition is not only musical. It combines sound, dance, costume, gesture, group identity and public space.

== Fiesta de Verdiales ==
The Fiesta de Verdiales is the main festive context in which the tradition is performed. It includes meetings of pandas, singing, dancing, instrumental performance, contests and public celebration. The best-known celebration is the Fiesta Mayor de Verdiales, held in Málaga around 28 December, the day of the Holy Innocents.

The fiesta has older rural roots, but its modern public form also reflects changes in Málaga society. The 2010 Andalusian heritage decree notes that, until the 1960s, the tradition was strongly concentrated in the Montes de Málaga, while later rural depopulation and migration brought verdiales into peripheral neighborhoods of the city of Málaga and into new contexts of performance and spectacle.

Today, verdiales are performed in local festivals, competitions, cultural events and flamenco contexts. The fiesta remains a marker of identity for many communities in the province of Málaga. It is also used in cultural education and heritage programs as an example of Andalusian intangible heritage.

== Cultural heritage status ==
In 2010 the Junta de Andalucía inscribed the Fiesta de Verdiales in the General Catalogue of Andalusian Historical Heritage as a Bien de Interés Cultural, under the category of Actividad de Interés Etnológico. The decree emphasized the living, dynamic and orally transmitted character of the tradition, as well as its role in reinforcing territorial and group identity in Málaga.

The Spanish government's Portal of Intangible Cultural Heritage also lists the Fiesta de Verdiales as part of Andalusia's intangible cultural heritage. These recognitions reflect the importance of verdiales not only as a musical genre but also as a social practice, festive ritual and marker of local memory.

The preservation of verdiales depends on the continuity of pandas, local festivals, intergenerational transmission and community participation. Because the tradition is performative and collective, safeguarding it involves more than preserving recordings or written descriptions. It requires maintaining the social contexts in which the music, dance, costume and ritual roles continue to make sense.

== In flamenco repertory ==
In professional flamenco, verdiales are less frequently performed than palos such as soleá, bulerías, seguiriya, tangos or alegrías. Nevertheless, they remain important because they show the relationship between flamenco and older Andalusian folk practices. Flamenco singers may perform verdiales as part of the Málaga fandango family, often together with other cantes abandolaos.

For guitarists, verdiales provide characteristic rhythmic and harmonic material. The guitar accompaniment is usually bright, energetic and repetitive, supporting the danceable character of the style. In solo flamenco guitar, composers and performers have sometimes adapted verdiales themes or rhythms into concert pieces, though the traditional form remains strongly associated with ensemble performance.

== Distinction from related forms ==
Verdiales are sometimes confused with other Málaga or fandango-related forms. The closest relatives include:

- Malagueña – a flamenco style derived from the Málaga fandango, usually freer and more soloistic than verdiales.
- Rondeña – another Málaga-related fandango form associated with Ronda and also with a later solo-guitar tradition.
- Jabera – a Málaga cante related to the fandango family.
- Jabegote – a Málaga coastal cante associated with fishermen and the jábega fishing boat.
- Fandangos abandolaos – a broader group of rhythmic fandango styles of which verdiales are often considered an important example.

The main differences lie in social function, instrumentation and rhythm. Verdiales are especially marked by the panda, the violin-led ensemble, the decorated fiesta setting and the continued importance of communal dance.

== Audio example ==
Example of verdiales guitar falsetas.

== See also ==
- Flamenco
- Palo (flamenco)
- Fandango
- Cantes de Málaga
- Malagueña (flamenco style)
- Rondeña
- Almogía
- Comares
- Montes de Málaga
