= Rita la Cantaora =

Spanish singer (1859–1937)

- Also known as: Rita la Cantaora
- Born: Rita Giménez García; 1859; Jerez de la Frontera, Cádiz, Spain
- Died: 29 June 1937 (aged 78) Zorita del Maestrazgo, Castellón, Spain
- Genres: Flamenco
- Occupations: Singer, dancer
- Instrument: Voice

Rita Giménez García, most commonly known as Rita la Cantaora (1859–1937), was one of the most famous Spanish singers of flamenco in her time due to her performances in cafés cantantes, places where flamenco artists used to play music live.

== Career beginnings ==
From an early age, she distinguished herself for her outstanding talent, not only for singing flamenco but also for dancing it, which became her way of making a living. Her career began in her home town, Jerez de la Frontera (Cádiz), where a theatrical agent heard her singing Andalusian coplas. He hired her and from that moment on, she began to perform with other famous flamenco singers, such as Juana La Macarrona and Antonio Ortega, most commonly known as Juan Breva, in cafés cantantes, such as the famous Café Romero, placed on Calle Alcalá in Madrid, Spanish capital city.

== Career ==
Between 1884 and 1895, she worked on many occasions with distinguished artists, such as José Barea, María la Macarrona, las Borriqueras, el Malagueño, etc. She achieved such great success that "El Enano" magazine published a poem, in which they praised her extraordinary beauty and natural charm.

La Cantaora began to appear on posters of one of the biggest and most famous stages for flamenco singers, dancers and guitar players: Madrid's Liceo Ríus, which would later be renamed 'Salón Variedades'.

In March 1892, she took part in the rendition of a play titled "Mi mismo nombre" in a charity event in Madrid. In August, she also participated in the pantomime "La feria de Sevilla" along with singer Juan Breva and dancer Soledad Menéndez.

In 1897, Rita worked again with La Macarrona and Barea, among many others, in the new renamed 'Salón Variedades'. In 1901, Alrededor del mundo magazine acknowledged her as "one of the best flamenco singers of the time". A year later, she returned to the Salón Variedades’ stage to perform alongside Paca Aguilera.

In 1904, Nuñez de Prado, an Andalusian poet, praised her remarkable artistic abilities as a flamenco singer in his book Cantaores Andaluces:

"The popularity of her name is immense, and she is greatly supported, not only due to her artistic abilities, but also due to her charming and communicative personality [...]. Yet she is fairly admired, and even more fairly acclaimed, because she has something unique, not ordinary, which is a distinguishing feature of a specific psychology."

— Núñez de Prado

The poet even compared her to Antonio Chacón, one of the most talented flamenco singers of the time.

In 1906, she was a member of the flamenco troupe 'El Café del Gato'. During the next few years, she performed alongside other major artists of the time, such as Fosforito el Viejo or Antonia Gallardo Rueda, whose stage name was 'La Coquinera'. In the 1920s, she had the chance to work with Manuel Pavón and Manuel Escacena, becoming one of the most prominent flamenco figures in the Spanish capital of the early 20th century.

She spent most of her time in Madrid during her artistic career. She excelled in the different genres of Andalusian coplas, especially in singing malagueñas, soleares, and bulerías.

Even though she was already well known throughout Spain in the twenties, she would not hesitate to perform wherever she was requested to work at, despite being paid very little money.

The initial stage of her career was extremely busy, and as time went by, it became impossible to keep up with that lifestyle. As a consequence, her singing career began to suffer. In an interview with La Estampa magazine in 1934, she admitted that although she had "lived the life of a queen", she ended up being "as poor as a church mouse."

Her last live performance took place three years before her death in 1934, at Café de Magallanes in Madrid. It was a charity festival, in which many veteran artists participated, such as La Coquinera or Fosforito, who had asked Rita to take part in the event. She sang two songs: a malagueña by Fosforito, called "Desde que te conocí" and "Males que acarrea el tiempo", by La Serneta and Enrique El Mellizo. According to Er Compás magazine, she was proud of being able to perform in such a great event despite being 75 years old.

== Personal life ==
Rita had to make a living out of her talent as a flamenco singer from a very early age. She was born in Jerez de la Frontera, but moved to Madrid, where she spent most of her time. There she had the opportunity to mingle with some of the most important flamenco artists of the time, and with many of them, she established friendships. She was close friends with Fosforito, La Paloma, Las Coquineras, and later, she met Manuel Pavón Varela, most commonly known as "Maneli" and Manuel Escacena, known as "Cabeza de Pepino".

After establishing a friendship with Patricio el Feo, she moved with him to Carabanchel Alto. Then she met Manuel González Flores, a dump truck worker, who she considered her husband, even though they were not legally married. Manuel was a widower and had a daughter and four grandchildren. In 1930, Manuel died suddenly. After that, Rita took care of his daughter and her children and she spent the rest of her life helping them with housework duties.

Rita died 29 June 1937 due to an asystole at the age of 78 in Zorita del Maestrazgo in the province of Castellón, where she and the citizens of Carabanchel had been evacuated by the authorities in 1936, when the Spanish Civil War broke out.

"The existence of Rita was eccentric but not problematic. Her life consisted in loving as much as she could, singing everything that she was asked to and enjoying every pleasure of life within her reach", according to Oído al Cantante Flamenco newspaper.

== Spanish popular culture ==
Rita la Cantaora still lives on in the present Spanish popular culture, not so much for her fantastic work as a flamenco singer and dancer, but because her name has been associated with an expression that belongs to the Spanish collection of proverbs. She had such a fierce passion that she was willing to perform wherever she was asked to, even if she was paid very little. Her reputation was such, that her own colleagues would recommend her to event-hosts when they were not offered enough money for their services. Consequently, people coined the expression "que lo haga Rita la Cantaora" ("tell Rita la Cantaora to do it") to refer to those occasions, in which one was not willing to perform a task. However, other people think that such proverb originated as an insult in her hometown, where it is said that Rita was not well-regarded. As the time went by, the expression spread throughout the whole Spanish country and evolved into many others catchphrases such as "va a ir Rita la Cantaora" ("Rita la Cantaora will go there"), "te lo va a pagar Rita la Cantaora" ("Rita la Cantaora will pay you"), "que trabaje Rita la Cantaora" ("Rita la Cantaora will work"), among many others to express that one does not want to go somewhere, that one does not have the intention to pay for a bill or that one does not want to work, respectively. It is so common to use these catchphrases that many Spanish people think that Rita is a fictional character.
