= Pericón de Cádiz =

Juan Martínez Vílchez, known as Pericón de Cádiz (20 September 1901 in Cádiz – 1980 in Cádiz), was a flamenco singer who was able to recover different palos (forms) and old cantes. He has left valuable recordings; his repertoire was extensive and is considered one of the last masters of singing in his land. He belonged to a select group of singers who raised the cantes of Cádiz to the highest level and allowed the recovery of the artistic and anthropological value of Flamenco.

== Biography ==
He was born in the Plaza del Mentidero, at Calle Vea Murgía 5, in the city of Cádiz, the son of the couple formed by Adolfo and María, who were not gypsies and who had seven children. From a humble family, he barely went to school for three or four years and soon began to work as a street vendor selling sweets and candies, and as a small singer on the horse-drawn carriages that travelled around the city.

His first performance was at the Olimpia in Seville. He took part in the shows of the Flamenco Opera, Pepe Marchena's company, and toured many provincial capitals, ending up in the Cadiz bullring, where he had great success.

In 1936 he competed in the Circo Price competition in Madrid organised by the businessman Alberto Montserrat, winning first prize for seguiriyas and soleares, and was awarded 1,000 pesetas.

At the end of the war he took part in the show "Las calles de Cádiz" by Concha Piquer's company with the Niña de los Peines, Pepe Pinto, Niño Ricardo and other greats of the time. With this company he travelled all over Spain. In 1948, Pericón won a new prize in the competition held at the Teatro Monumental in Madrid, and from 1952 onwards he stayed in Madrid for a long time, living the nightlife of the "tablaos" with young men and aristocrats. For thirteen years he sang in the Zambra tablao, travelling with his group to various European capitals. From the 1960s onwards he was involved in the process of dignifying and giving prestige to flamenco by intellectuals and artists.

"If you do not know the measure of the songs and their compass bad future you will have as a singer": said Pericón.

He even recorded several albums and some television programmes. Two programmes were devoted to Juan Martinez Vilches: "Rito y Geografía del Cante" (1974) and "Flamenco" (1976) directed by the poet and writer Fernando Quiñones. Both were broadcast on the Second Channel of Spanish Television. The songs he performed in both were: bulerías, soleares, tanguillos, alegrías, tangos and malagueñas chicas. He was accompanied by Felix de Utrera on the guitar and among the palmeros there was one of luxury: Curro La Gamba, husband of La Perla de Cádiz.

As for the recordings, he started recording late. His first recordings on slate discs date from the beginning of the 1940s and were made by the record companies Odeón and Columbia: seguidillas, two variants of malagueñas, cantiñas, two styles of alegrías, various styles of bulerías, including one with fandango, fandangos and guajiras; accompanied in playing by Niño Ricardo and Melchor de Marchena. He participated with almost 70 years in the historical anthology of the Hispavox firm of the sixties, directed by Rafael Pastor. In this Anthology, accompanied by the guitar of Félix Utrera, Pericón showed cantes that were forgotten or that had a singer's own stamp: seguiriyas by Enrique Ortega (Caracol's great-grandfather), soleares by Morsilla (son of the Mellizo), bulerías by Antonio Herrero (a cantaor from his youth who later excelled as a tocaor), cantes by Enrique Butrón (a cantaor who never became professional and created the alegrías style "Cantiñas de Romero El Tito", guajiras por bulerías from Espeleta, tanguillos, villancicos, the two malagueñas from El Mellizo, the granaína, the malagueña doble and mirabrás (in which Andrés Heredia played the guitar). He also took part in the Anthology of the Vergara house with five songs: soleares, alegrías, tangos, the malagueña by El Mellizo and the short and long petenera.

Among the flamencologists who have studied his work well are José Blas Vega and José Luis Ortíz Nuevo.

The Cádiz poet Fernando Quiñones knew him well, as he was a patient of his father, a doctor in La Viña neighbourhood. As his father liked opera, once called him Pericón:

"Don Manué, don´t think there is so much difference between Opera and Flamenco. What happens is that in Opera, you go up, and in Flamenco, you go down".

According to Quiñones "With these words, Pericón alluded to a concept about the placement of the voice, to its high and low registers, but also to certain perceptions about the natural status of both genres: the social splendour, the wealthy environment, the high life of the Opera, and the humble universe, popular, low, typical of the gypsy-Andalusian folk arts, always with one hand behind and the other in front, but even more so in those years of general and exacerbated famine".

== Awards ==
- Circus Price (1936)
- Monumental Theatre of Madrid (1948)
- Chair of Flamencology in Jerez for his master's degree (1976).

== Bibliography ==
ORTIZ NUEVO, José Luis: Las mil y una historias de Pericón de Cádiz (The Thousand and One Stories of Pericón de Cádiz) Barataria Publishing House. Seville, 2008.
