= Music of Andalusia =

Musical styles of Andalusia, Spain

The Music of Andalusia encompasses a range of traditional and modern musical genres which originate in the region of Andalusia in southern Spain. The most famous are copla and flamenco, the latter being sometimes used as a portmanteau term for various regional musical traditions within Andalusia. Today, Andalusia has a rich and thriving musical scene, which draws from its own musical traditions as well as from external influences such as salsa, jazz or pop music.

== Historical influences on Andalusian music ==
Andalusia was probably the main route of transmission of a number of Near-Eastern musical instruments used in classical music; the rebec (ancestor of violin) from the Maghreb rebab, the guitar from qitara and naker from naqareh. Further terms fell into disuse in Europe; adufe from al-duff, alboka from al-buq, anafil from al-nafir, exabeba from al-shabbaba (flute), atabal (bass drum) from al-tabl, atambal from al-tinbal, the balaban, sonajas de azófar from sunuj al-sufr, the conical bore wind instruments, the xelami from the sulami or fistula (flute or musical pipe), the shawm and dulzaina from the reed instruments zamr and al-zurna, the gaita from the Rhaita, rackett from iraqya or iraqiyya, geige (German for a violin) from ghichak and the theorbo from the tarab.

According to historical sources, William VIII, the father of William, brought to Poitiers hundreds of Muslim prisoners. Trend acknowledges that the troubadors derived their sense of form and the subject matter of their poetry from Andalusia. The hypothesis that the troubador tradition was created, more or less, by William after his experience of Moorish arts while fighting with the Reconquista in Spain was also championed by Ramón Menéndez Pidal in the early twentieth-century, but its origins go back to the Cinquecento and Giammaria Barbieri (died 1575) and Juan Andrés (died 1822). Meg Bogin, English translator of the female troubadors, also held this hypothesis. Certainly "a body of song of comparable intensity, profanity and eroticism [existed] in Arabic from the second half of the 9th century onwards." Grove Dictionary of Music and Musicians, edited

Andalusia is a modern autonomous community of Spain that is best known for flamenco, a form of music and dance, mostly performed by artists and ordinary people from Andalusia.

Improvised flamenco songs of ancient Andalusian origin are called cante jondo, and are characterized by a reduced tonal ambiance, a strict rhythm, baroque ornamentation and repetition of notes. Cante jondo is sung by a single singer (cantaor).

== Structure ==
There are two forms of flamenco songs: cante jondo and cante chico. Cante jondo are slower and usually feature sad lyrics about disappointed love or death, while cante chico are much quicker, more popular and dance-oriented. The concept of duende is very important in flamenco. Loosely defined, duende is a spiritual or emotional bond between the performer and audience, created by the performer's intense concentration and passion.

There are multiple styles (palos) of flamenco, including:

- fandango
- fandangos de Huelva
- granadínos - from Granada
- malagueñas - from Málaga
- saeta
- sevillana
- siguiriyas
- soleares
- Tangos

The guitar is a vital instrument to flamenco; it marks the measure of a song, and is frequently used in expressive solos during which the guitarist will improvise short variations called falsetas. Ramón Montoya was the most influential early guitarist, known for having solidified the guitar as a solo instrument. His successors included Manolo Sanlúcar and Paco de Lucía.

== History ==
The golden age of flamenco is said to be 1869 to 1910, later becoming more and more popularized internationally and influenced by South American music, especially the tango. Musicians from the golden age performed at bars called café cantantes, such as Café de Chinitas in Málaga, which was made famous by the poetry of García Lorca. Other musicians of the early 20th century include Manolo Caracol, who walked from Jerez to participate in a cante jondo competition, which he won.

Though the golden age had long since passed, the 1950s saw flamenco achieving increased respectability in Spain. Hispavox, a Spanish record label, released Antología del Cante Flamenco in 1956; the recording's collection of most all of the greatest flamenco singers was very popular. In 1956, the first national cante jondo competition was held in Cordoba, followed by a Chair of Flamencology being established at Jerez in 1958.

In the late 1950s and early 1960s, Antonio Mairena and similar artists kelped kickstart a flamenco revival as American and British rock began dominating the Spanish music scene. Emerging from this, Camarón de la Isla became one of the most popular and critically acclaimed performers of the century. His 1969 debut Con la Colaboracion Especial de Paco de Lucia inspired a new generation of performers that invented Nuevo Flamenco.

In the 1970s and 80s, salsa, blues, rumba and other influences were added to flamenco, along with music from India. Ketama's 1988 debut, Ketama, was especially influential. At the beginning of the 1990s, the Madrid label Nuevos Medios became closely associated with the new flamenco fusion music, which came to be called nuevo flamenco.

In the modern era Andalusian music continues to thrive, there have been efforts to preserve the tradition, as well as the traditional melodies, rhythms, and instruments, ensuring that this cultural heritage is passed down to future generations. Not only has this music been preserved in it original form, this music has been transformed into elements of Jazz, Fusion, and world music where it will be preserved forever in the music world.

== See also ==
- Music of Spain

== Bibliography ==
- Farmer, Henry George (1978). Historical facts for the Arabian musical influence. Ayer Publishing. ISBN 978-0-405-08496-6.
