= Soleá por bulerías =

Soleá (Soleares) por Bulerías is a flamenco palo. This dance is the product of the intensification of the Soleá rhythm or the deceleration of Bulería. This cante is an intermediate step between the Soleá and the Bulería but responds to the same rhythm of both.

== Structure ==
The structure is similar to most Flamenco dances and can be broken down as follows:

- ENTRADA/SALIDA (ENTRANCE): The dancer enters the stage via marking steps (marcando)
- LLAMADA: This is the call for the singer to sing the first letra.
- FIRST LETRA: The singer sings 7-12 sets of 12 count phrases
- SECOND LETRA OR FALSETA: The Falsetta is a musical phrase or phrases that the guitarist has composed or improvises that the dancer interprets with choreography.
- ESCOBILLA: Several sets of 12 count footwork phrases
- SUBIDA/PALMAS/CHOREOGRAPHY that transitions into a BULERIAS. Usually, a REMATE/LLAMADA, a finish and a cue that are performed together in sequence, will occur here to call in the singer for the BULERIAS FINALE.
- BULERIAS – FINALE for all 12 count dances. Here, the Bulerías is a structured improvisation with set phrases, a set structure, and learned or improvised choreography.

== Compás ==
The Compás is the same as in Soleá and Bulería:

It is a rhythm in 12 beats

1 2 3 4 5 6 7 8 9 10 11 12

== Palmas ==
The standard palmas for Soleá por Bulerías are the same as the palmas for the Alegrías:

12 + 1 + 2 + 3 + 4 + 5 + 6 + 7 + 8 + 9 + 10 + 11 +

== For Guitarists ==
Soléa por Bulerías combines standard chord patterns associated with the Soleares with the pulse of the Bulerías.

A Bb Bb/D Bb/C Bb A

12123 4567 8 9 1011

The Llamada

A Bb Bb C Bb A

12123 4567 8 9 1011

The letra

A Bb Bb A

12123 4567 8 9 1011

== Letra ==
Here is a sample of 3 traditional Letras por Soléa por bulerías.

Soleá por Bulerías de La Moreno

Dinero, Dios mío, dinero

yo no te he pedío ná

quiero que vengas a verme

de tu propia voluntá.

Soleá por Bulerías de Rosalía de Triana

Yo quiero ir a la Sierra de Egipto

porque me han dicho que hay allí

unos pobrecitos gitanos

y esos gitanitos lo que hacían

es pelar los borriquitos

de los castellanos.

Por eso yo quiero ir a la Sierrecita de Egipto.

Soleá por Bulerías de El Gloria

A ti mi Dios te va a mandar un castigo mu grande

y es porque tú te lo mereces

que tú me vienes culpando

y yo culpa no tengo

que de ti hable la gente.
