= Cantiñas =

Group of flamenco musical forms

The cantiñas (Spanish pronunciation: [kanˈtiɲas]) is a group of flamenco palos (musical forms), originated in the area of Cádiz in Andalusia (although some styles of cantiña have developed in the province of Seville). They share the same compás or rhythmic pattern with the soleá and are usually sung in a lively rhythm (between 120 and 160 beats per minute). They are normally sung in a major mode and have a festive mood.

The usual chord positions for the tonic chord in the guitar are those of E major, C major and, occasionally, A major, the latter usually reserved for solo guitar pieces. The chord progression is normally of the simple tonic-dominant type, although modern guitar players introduce other transitional chords.

The palos classified under this group are:

- Alegrías
- Romeras
- Caracoles
- Mirabrás
- Other cantiñas, including the "cantiñas de Pinini" (or "cantiñas de Utrera), "cantiña del contrabandista", "cantes de las Mirris" or "alegrías de Córdoba".

The main verse has four eight-syllable lines. They frequently also include a small refrain with three five-syllable lines.

Their popularity increased at the time of the flamenco cafés cantante that became the centre of professional flamenco performances from the mid 19th century to the 1920s. Originally, this songs were intended as support for dance.

Reference recordings for this palos are those by Chano Lobato, Aurelio Sellé, Manolo Vargas and La Perla de Cádiz for the Cádiz styles; Bernarda de Utrera and Fernanda de Utrera for the Pinini styles; Curro de Utrera for the "alegrías de Córdoba" or Antonio Chacón for the "caracoles". La Niña de los Peines is also an important reference for all these styles. Some modern singers who have recorded excellent versions of this styles are Camarón de la Isla, Carmen Linares or Mayte Martín.

== Sources ==
MARTÍN SALAZAR, Jorge: Los cantes flamencos, Diputación Provincial de Granada

ÁLVAREZ CABALLERO, Ángel: La discoteca ideal del flamenco, Planeta, 1995
