= Tientos (flamenco) =

Tientos is a flamenco Andalusian palo which has a rhythm consisting of 4 beats. It is in the same family as the Tangos, but slower and with different topics, lyrics and mood. Every Tientos becomes a Tangos at the end of the song/dance. Traditionally, cantaor El Marrurro (1848–1906) has been considered one of the creators of this style. Enrique el Mellizo gave it the modern form by which we know it today. Other famous cantaores who interpreted this style were Antonio Chacón and Pastora Pavón.

Like many Cante Jondo, traditional Tientos lyrics (letras) tend to be pathetic, sentimental, and speak about the lack of love, disillusionment and revenge. Dancers strive to capture this mood in their solos. It can be danced by a man or a woman.

== Structure ==
The structure is similar to most flamenco dances and can be broken down as follows:

- Guitar intro
- Song intro
- Footwork intro and llamada
- First letra, punctuated by a footwork during the respiro ‑ a break in the song after the second line of letra
- Guitar falsetta
- Escobilla (footwork section)
- Second letra
- Second escobilla
- Subida
- Macho or Tangos to close

== Compás ==
The compás of Tientos has a 4/4 time signature like the Tangos, but with the above 2 ways of accents. A simple one and more complicated one.

Tientos in its simple point of view:

Four-count rhythm with an added beat on the 'and' count of the second beat.

1+[2]+[3]+[4]+ 1+[2]+[3]+[4]

Tientos in its less simple point of view:

Each beat is broken into triplets, and that added beat after beat two is on the "a" of the triplet.

1+a[2]+[a][3]+a[4]+a

== Palmas ==
The standard palmas for both Tientos and Tangos are:

1+2+3+4+ or 1  2+3  4

== For guitarists ==
The basic compás for Tientos on the guitar can be performed with the same basic chords associated with the Tangos:

|B♭   |A   |B♭   |A   |

|Dm  |C   |B♭   |A   |

Passing chords are added to this basic pattern to create the harmony for the Letra:

|B♭   |A   |B♭   |A   |

double time

|B♭   |B♭  |A    |A   |

a tempo

|Dm   |Dm   |Dm   |G7   |C    |

|F      |B♭     |B♭    |A     |

|C      |F       |B♭    |A     |B♭   |A   |
