= Comares =

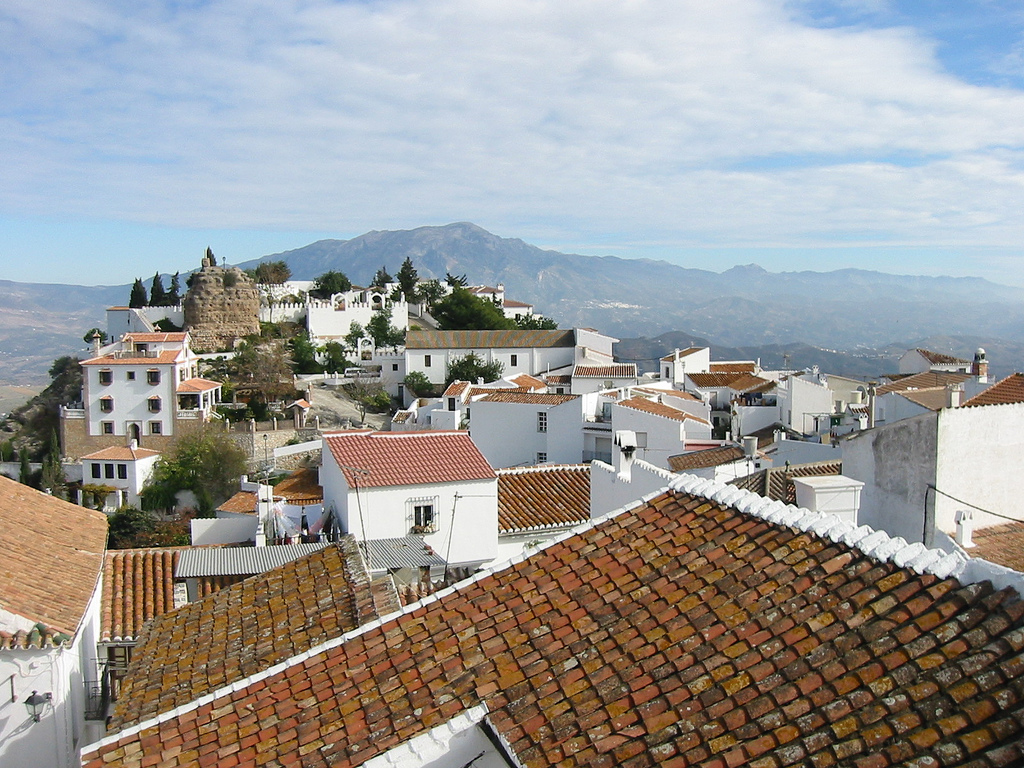

- Coat of arms

- Location in Andalusia
- Coordinates: 36°51′N 4°14′W
- Sovereign state: Spain
- Autonomous community: Andalusia
- Province: Málaga
- Comarca: Axarquía

Government

Area
  - Total: 255.5 km^{2} (98.6 sq mi)
- Elevation: 703 m (2,306 ft)

Population (2025-01-01)
  - Total: 1,354
  - Density: 5.299/km^{2} (13.73/sq mi)
- Demonym: Comareño
- Time zone: UTC+1 (CET)
  - Summer (DST): UTC+2 (CEST)
- Postal code: 29195
- Website: http://www.comares.es

Comares is a town and municipality in the province of Málaga, part of the autonomous community of Andalusia in southern Spain. The municipality is situated approximately 28 kilometers from the provincial capital and 24 from Vélez-Málaga. It is located in the foothills of the Montes de Málaga 703 meters above sea level. Comares is one of the 31 villages that make up the comarca of Axarquía.

It is bordered to the north with Riogordo, to the north, northeast and east with Cútar, to the south with El Borge, to the southwest and west with Málaga and to the northwest with Colmenar.

It has a population of approximately 1,420 residents. The natives are called Moriscosos.

== Geography ==
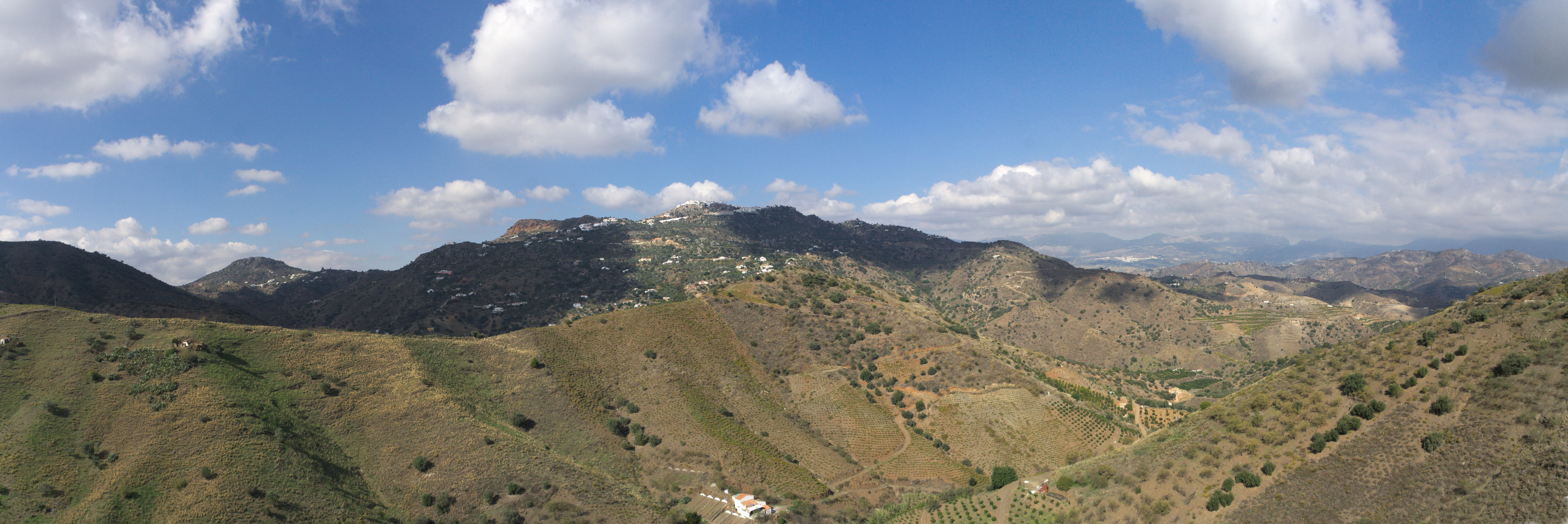
Comares on top of Cerro de Mazmúllar

The population core is located in slight decline, on the crest of a steep mountain at 703 m. The region is full of ravines, hamlets and farms scattered around the mountain. Its highest point is the hill of Mazmúllar (721 m). A dip the end of the rivers Cuevas or Benamargosa feeds the streams of Cútar, Fuente Delgada and Solano, which are dry most of the year. The town's water supply comes from the springs called Délga, Gorda, Caño Seco and Maroto.

The main economic activity is agriculture, such as olives, grapes and almonds. Comares is on the Ruta de la Pasa, the route of the grape. The Pasas de Málaga are a Protected Designation of Origin. These grapes are only grown in the Axarquía and around Manilva. The grapes are dried in the sun in typical drying cages called paseros. In recent years rural tourism has become a major part of the economy of Coresma.

== History ==
The origin of the name Comares is from the arabic word qumaris or hins comarix, which means "castle in the height." Comares was not founded by the Arabs, but by the Greeks and Phoenicians who arrived on the coast of Málaga in the seventh century BC. It was a moorish fortress since the eighth century CE We also know that was one of the defensive bastions of omar ben Hhfsun in his fight against the Umayyad Caliphate of Córdoba. It was considered one of the strategic points of the rayya (archidona), then capital of the taha of Málaga.

== See also ==
- List of municipalities in Málaga
