= Enrique el Mellizo =

Spanish flamenco singer (1848–1906)

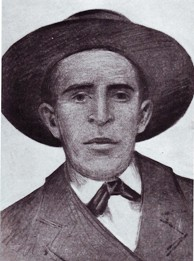
Enrique El Mellizo

Enrique Jiménez Fernández (1 December 1848 – 30 May 1906), known as Enrique el Mellizo was a famous flamenco singer, the most influential one in the development of the Cádiz flamenco styles. Together with Silverio Franconetti and Antonio Chacón, he is considered to be one of the most important figures in the development of flamenco. He was the author of one of the most important malagueña styles, and is reported to have created or developed some styles of Soleares, Alegrías, and Tangos. An oral tradition also states that he was the creator of the Tientos.

== Biography ==
According to his birth certificate, he was born in Cádiz, the son of Antonio Jiménez, slaughterman. The name of the mother is omitted, noting that he was an illegitimate son. In spite of his nickname Mellizo (meaning twin), he had no twin brothers, but inherited the nickname of his father.

He inherited his father's profession, and performed only occasionally in the cafés cantante in Cádiz, refusing to become a professional. He never travelled out of his native town. Nevertheless, his fame grew in all Andalusia, and singers from other towns travelled to Cádiz to hear him. According to some testimonies, he had a moody character. Although he was normally a sociable character, he fell into crises in which he escaped all company in solitary places. He died at 58 years old, of tuberculosis. Although at the time of his death, some flamenco recordings have already been done, he never went into a recording studio. His styles, though, were preserved by other singers, mainly from Cádiz, who knew them directly or indirectly. His legacy has been kept alive by singers like his brothers Enrique and Antonio, Aurelio Sellé, El Niño de la Isla, Manolo Vargas, La Perla de Cádiz, Chaquetón, Pericón de Cádiz, Manolo Caracol, Chano Lobato and many others.

== His musical legacy ==
The main creation of El Mellizo was his malagueña, totally innovative at the time, which approximated this style, originally not linked to gypsies, to the more gypsy style of singing. According to tradition, he created that malagueña style after a love disappointment in which he fell into one of his periods of solitary wandering. During that time, he went into a church and was inspired by a priest singing the preface to the Catholic mass. In remembrance of this, the preface of the mass is sometimes sung nowadays as an introduction to his malagueña. The style certainly bears some reminiscence to a liturgic chant.

According to the opinion of critics, it was Enrique el Mellizo who first sang the malagueña as a cante libre, that is, without a definite metre or rhythmic regular pattern.

Other contributions that are attributed to him (mostly based on oral tradition and unproved) are the following:

- He was the first to sing Alegrías as cante para escuchar (song for listening), as opposed to cante para bailar (song for dancing). Originally, Alegrías were a palo (musical form) intended for dance only. He would have enriched the melodic line to make them apt as recital pieces.
- He was the creator of tientos, basing its melodies on styles of flamenco Tangos. This theory is contested by critics who think it was singer Diego El Marruro who did this.
- He created or developed several styles of soleá
- He contributed to the development of flamenco tangos, enriching it musically.
- He was the creator of the saeta por seguiriyas, applying features of the seguiriya to traditional saetas
- He also created or developed several seguiriya styles.

== Sources ==
ÁLVAREZ CABALLERO, Ángel "Enrique el Mellizo, un gigante" in El cante flamenco, Alianza Editorial, Madrid, 1998

MARTIN SALAZAR, Jorge: Los cantes flamencos, Diputación provincial de Granada
