= Chano Lobato =

Spanish flamenco singer

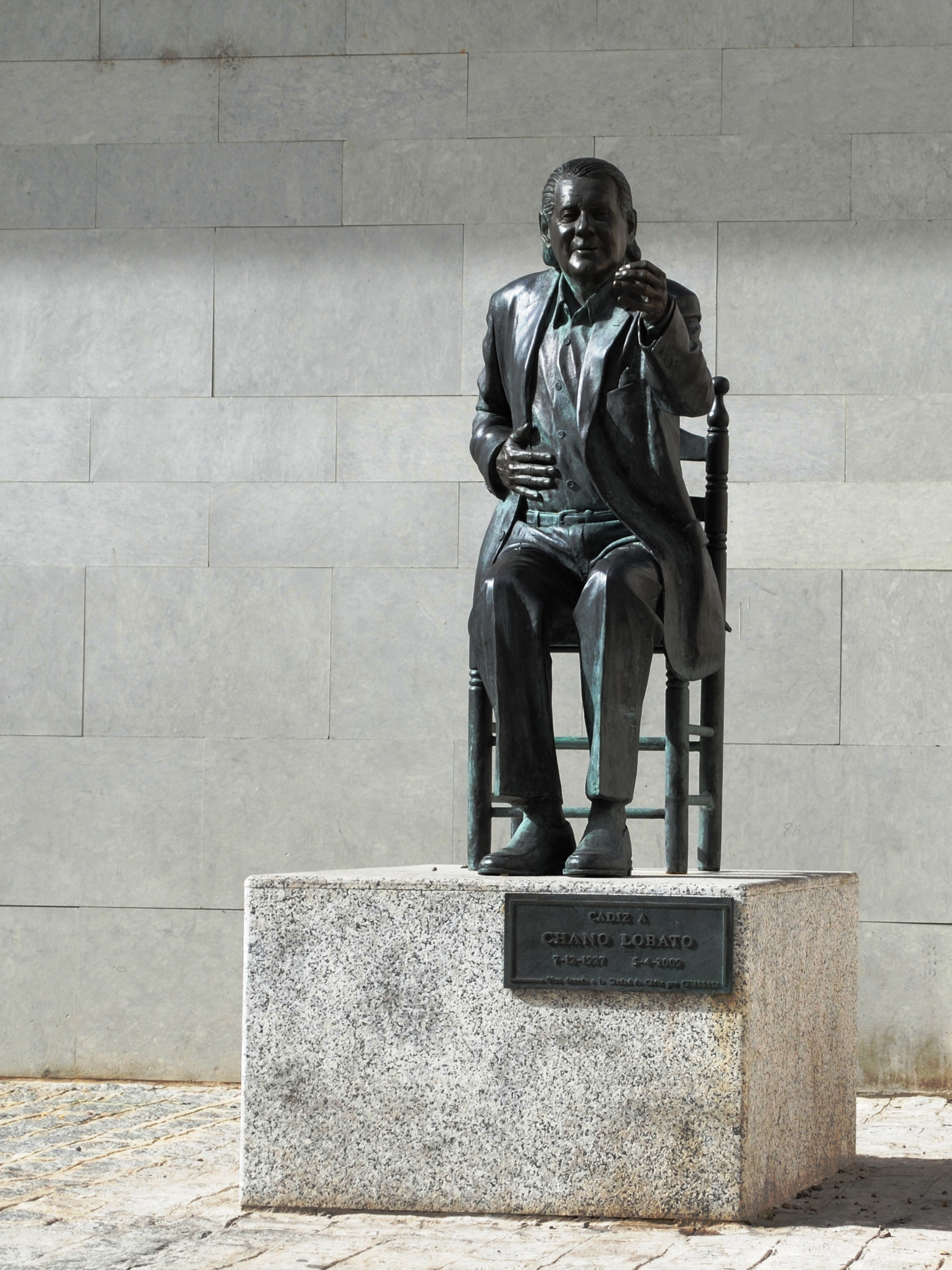
Statue of Lobato at Plaza de la Merced, Cádiz

Chano Lobato (December 1927 – 5 April 2009) was a Spanish flamenco singer.

== Life ==
Born in the Santa María neighborhood of Cádiz, he began performing at nightclubs in his hometown and later moved to Madrid, where he joined Alejandro Vega's Flamenco dance group. He became well known for performing with Antonio El Bailarín in particular, but also Manuel Morao and El Serna and for various notable dancers, including Matilde Coral.

In 1974 Lobato received the Enrique El Mellizo award at the national contest Concurso Nacional de Córdoba and in 1996 he received the Medalla de Andalucía (Medal of Andalusia).

According to writer and flamencologist Manuel Ríos Ruiz, "Chano Lobato is an artist who gets emotional when he sings, who gets drunk with his singing, and quickly transmits his purest essence to the knowledgeable enthusiasts".

Among the "palos" or varieties of flamenco songs and dances that he developed throughout his life are the Alegrías.

Lobato died on 5 April 2009 in Seville.

== Discography ==
Albums

Chano Lobato made many recordings. Amongst the most recent are:

- 1996 La Nuez Mosca
- 1997 Aromas de Cadiz
- 1997 Con sabor a cuarto
- 1998 El Flamenco Vive 2CD
- 2000 Azucar Cande
- 2000 Que Veinte Años No Es Nada
- 2002 Romea
- 2003 Memorias de Cádiz

Contributing artist

- The Rough Guide to Flamenco (1997, World Music Network)

== Bibliography ==
- Chano Lobato. Toda la sal de la bahía. VV.AA. Ayto. La Unión, 2007
- Chano Lobato. Memorias de Cádiz. Marqués J.M. y Téllez, J.J.. Dip. Cádiz, 2003
