= Fandango =

Musical form and a music genre typical of Spain and parts of Latin America

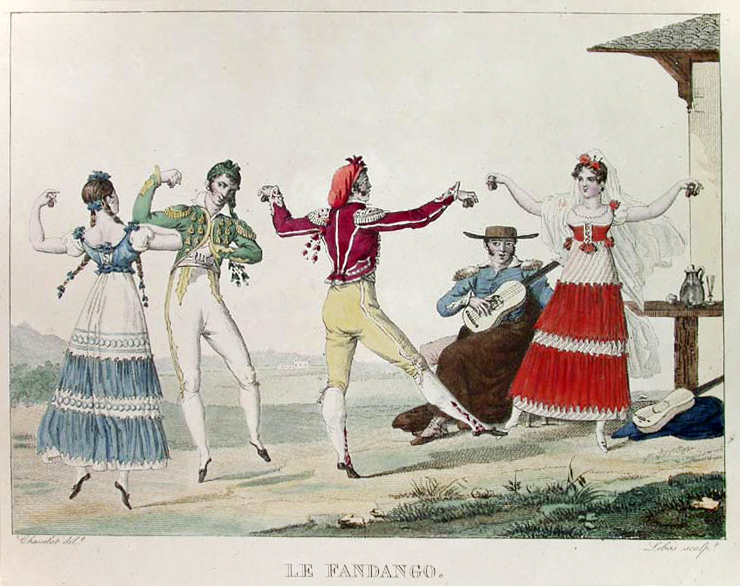
Eighteenth century Castilian fandango dancers (by Pierre Chasselat) (1753–1814)

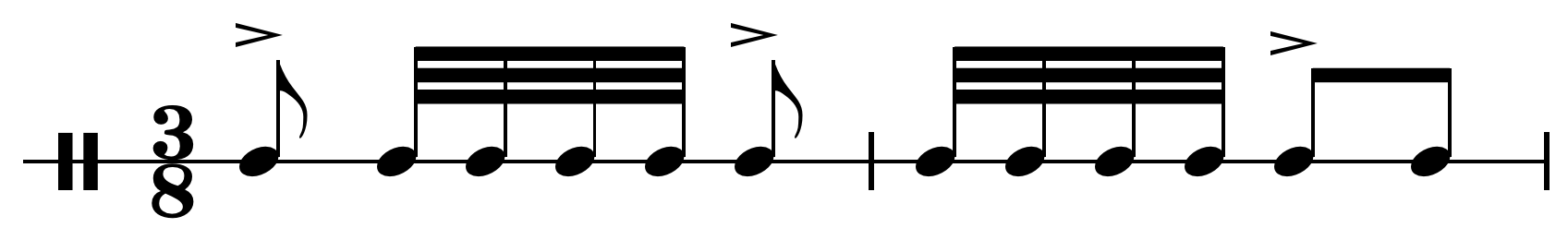
Fandango rhythm.

Fandango is a lively partner dance originating in Spain, usually in triple metre, traditionally accompanied by guitars, castanets, tambourine or hand-clapping. Fandango can both be sung and danced. Sung fandango is usually bipartite: it has an instrumental introduction followed by variaciones. Sung fandango usually follows the structure of cante that consist of four or five octosyllabic verses (coplas) or musical phrases (tercios). Occasionally, the first copla is repeated.

The meter of fandango is similar to that of the bolero and seguidilla. It was originally notated in 6/8 time, of slow tempo, mostly in the minor, with a trio in the major; sometimes, however, the whole was in a major key. Later it took the 3-4 tempo, and the characteristic Spanish rhythm.

== Origins ==
The earliest fandango melody is found in the anonymous "Libro de diferentes cifras de guitarra" from 1705, and the earliest description of the dance itself is found in a 1712 letter by Martín Martí, a Spanish priest. The fandango's first sighting in a theatrical work was in Francisco de Leefadeal's entremés "El novio de la aldeana" staged in Seville, ca. 1720. By the late 18th century it had become fashionable among the aristocracy and was often included in tonadillas, zarzuelas, ballets and operas, not only in Spain, but also elsewhere in Europe.

Widely varying claims have been made about the origin of fandango: its relation to the jabera, the soleá, and the petenera; to the Andalusian malagueña, granadina, murciana and rondeña; to the canario and gitano; to the jota aragonesa.

=== Condemnation and liberation by Spanish Church ===
There is a curious piece of history said to be connected with this dance. Soon after its first introduction, in the 17th century, it was condemned by the ecclesiastical authorities in Spain as a "godless dance". Just as the Consistory were about to prohibit it, one of the judges remarked that it was not fair to condemn anyone unheard. Two celebrated dancers were accordingly introduced to perform the fandango before the Consistory. This they did with such effect, that, according to the old chronicler, "every one joined in, and the hall of the consistorium was turned into a dancing saloon". No more was heard of the condemnation of the fandango.

== Classical music ==
The form of fandango has been used by many European composers, and often included in stage and instrumental works. Notable examples include J. P. Rameau's "Les trois mains" (in "Nouvelles suites de pièces de clavecin", ca. 1729–30); Fandango forms #19 in the part 2 of Gluck's ballet Don Juan (1761); in the third-act finale of Mozart's opera The Marriage of Figaro (1786); in the finale of Luigi Boccherini's String Quartet Op. 40 No. 2 (1798) and Guitar Quintet G.448; Antonio Soler's Fandango for harpsichord; and the finale of Rimsky-Korsakov's Capriccio Espagnol. Luis de Freitas Branco's third movement of his "Suite Alentejana No. 1" is inspired on the fandango of the regions of Alentejo and Ribatejo of Portugal. Camille Saint-Saëns' "Danse Macabre" also follows the rhythm of the fandango. In the 21st century, Italian composer Carlotta Ferrari has written several Fandangos; particularly, her 2020 "Fandango RPS" uses the Restarting Pitch Space harmony system.

Italian composer Domenico Scarlatti, who was influenced by Iberian folk music, had several passages reminiscent of fandango, such as in his keyboard sonata K. 492 (1756) which has been called "Fandango portugués". The piece "Fandango del Sigr. Escarlate" has been attributed to him, but some scholars dispute this claim and its similarity to fandangos.

The Spanish form of fandango is given by Dohrn in the Neue Zeitschrift für Musik.

== Spanish dance ==
The current 3/4 pattern of the fandango, its distinctive progression (i–iv–V) lyrics with octosyllabic verses and the use of castanets and guitars are well-documented from the 18th century. The fandangos grandes (big fandangos) are normally danced by couples, which start out slowly with gradually increasing tempo. Many varieties are derived from this one. The fandanguillos (little fandangos) are livelier, more festive derivations of fandangos. Some regions of Spain have developed their own style of fandangos, such as Huelva (fandangos de Huelva) and Málaga (fandangos de Málaga, or Verdiales). Northern areas such as the Principality of Asturias, the Basque Country and Castile and León have preserved a more relaxed performance.

== Portuguese dance ==
Fandango is one of the main folk dances in Portugal. The choreography is quite simple: on its more frequent setting two male dancers face each other, dancing and tap-dancing one at a time, showing which has the most lightness and repertoire of feet changes in the tap-dancing. The dancers can be boy and girl, boy and boy (most frequent) or, rarely, two girls.

The "fandango do Ribatejo" refers specifically to the form of fandango practiced in Ribatejo, Portugal. The dance is usually performed by two Campinos.

== Figurative meaning ==
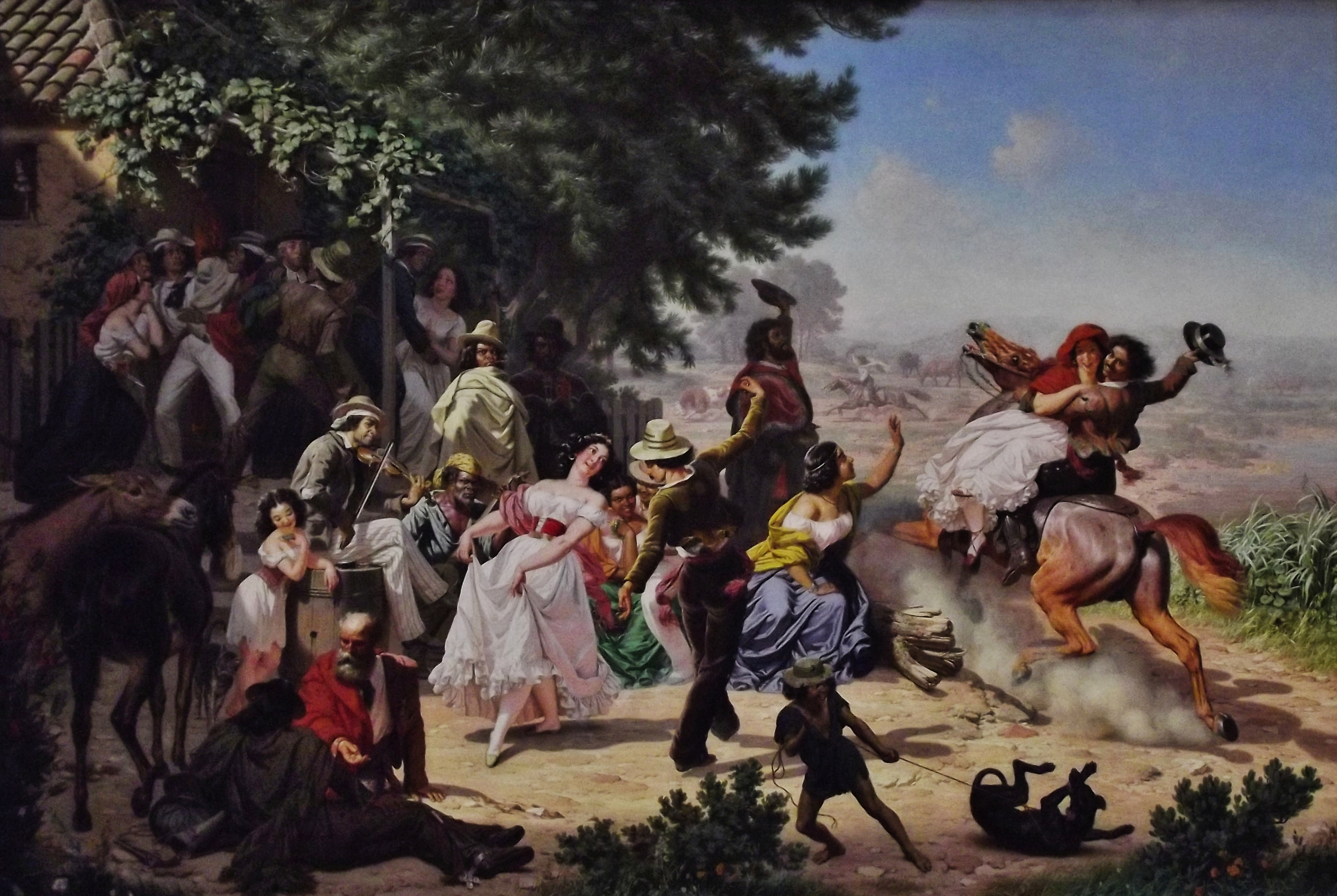
The Fandango (1873; Charles Christian Nahl) depicts a fiesta of Californios dancing the fandango in Mexican California.

As a result of the extravagant features of the dance, the word fandango is used as a synonym for "a quarrel", "a big fuss" or " a foolish or pretentious act"

== Fandango in Veracruz ==
In Veracruz, Mexico, a fandango is a party where people get together to dance, to play and to sing in a community setting. As local musicians perform the Son Jarocho music, people dance "zapateado" atop a large wooden platform known as a Tarima.

== Philippine Pandanggo ==
The Fandango became one of the most influential and widespread dance style within the Islands during the Spanish colonial period, along with the Jota (music). The dance was first popularized by the upper class Illustrados and was later adapted by the local masses, becoming a staple of rural Filipino folk dances. Spelled as "Pandanggo" in Filipino languages, the dance branched into different local variations. One of the most well-known Filipino adaption is the Pandanggo sa Ilaw from Mindoro. The Fandango was also used as musical basis for other Traditional Philippine folk dances, including Cariñosa and Pandanggo Rinconada from Nabua, Camarines Sur. The Fandango was also utilized in Religious celebrations and devotional dances, such as the Obando Fertility Rites, and the Pandangguhan of Pateros in honor of Saint Martha.

== General and cited references ==
- Diccionario de la lengva castellana (Madrid, 1726–37/R1963 as Diccionario de autoridades) [pubn of the Real Academia Español]
- P. Minguet e Irol: Breve tratado de los pasos de danzar a la española que hoy se estilan en seguidillas, fandangos y otros tañidos (Madrid, 1760, 2/1764)
- F. M. López: : Variaciones al Minuet afandangado (late 18th century) E-Mn M.1742), ff. 1–6
- M. L. E. Moreau de Saint-Méry: Danse (Paris, 1798)
- B. Foz: Vida de Pedro Saputo (Zaragoza, 1844/R)
- E. Calderón: Escenas andaluzas (Madrid, 1847)
- E. Ocón y Rivas: Cantos españoles (Málaga, 1874, 2/1906)
- M. de Larramendi: Corografía o descripción general de la muy noble y muy real Provincia de Guipúzcoa (Barcelona, 1882)
- ‘La jota y el fandango’, La correspondencia musical, iv/198 (1884), 2–3
- J. Ribera y Tarragó: La música de la jota aragonesa: ensayo histórico (Madrid, 1928)
- M. N. Hamilton: Music in Eighteenth-Century Spain (Urbana, IL, 1937)
- P. Nettl: The Story of Dance Music (New York, 1947)
- B. Pottier: ‘A propos de fandango’, Les langues néo-latines, xlii (1947), 22–5
- A. Gobin: Le flamenco (Paris, 1975)
- J. Crivillé i Bargalló: El folklore musical (Madrid, 1983)
- M. R. Alvarez Martínez: ‘Dos obras inéditas de Domenico Scarlatti’, RdMc, viii (1985), 51–6
- E. Osorio Bolio de Saldívar: ‘El códice Saldívar: una nueva fuente de música para guitarra’, España en la música de occidente: Salamanca 1985, 87–91
- R. Puyana: ‘Influencias ibéricas y aspectos por investigar en la obra para clave de Domenico Scarlatti’, ibid., 39–49
- J. Blas Vega: ‘Fandango’, Diccionario enciclopédico ilustrado del flamenco (Madrid, 1988), 284–5
- J. Etzion: ‘The Spanish Fandango from Eighteenth-Century “Lasciviousness” to Nineteenth-Century Exoticism’, AnM, xlviii (1993), 229–50
- J.-M. Sellen: ‘Langage du fandango: de la poétique musicale au sens poétique du cante jondo’, AnM, 1 (1995), 245–70
