= Malagueñas (flamenco style) =

Musical form and style of flamenco

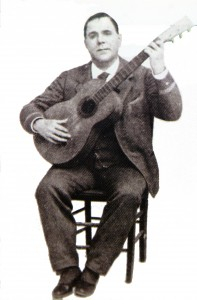
Juan Breva

Malagueñas (Spanish pronunciation: [malaˈɣeɲas]) is one of the traditional styles of Andalusian music (flamenco), derived from earlier types of fandango from the area of Málaga, classified among the Cantes de Levante. Originally a folk-song type, it became a flamenco style in the 19th century. It is not normally used for dance, as it is generally interpreted with no regular rhythmic pattern, as a "cante libre." It has a very rich melody with virtuous flourishes and use of microtones. Its guitar accompaniment is normally played in open position first inversion giving E for the tonic, which can be transposed by using a capo.

== History ==
=== Origins ===
Malagueñas derive from local variety of the Fandangos, a type of dance that, with different regional variations and even different names, became very popular in great part of Spain in the 18th century. Although nowadays malagueñas are a typical instance of "cante libre", performed at libitum and normally not used for the dance, folkloric fandangos were originally sung and played at a fast speed, with a rhythmic pattern in 6/8, to accompany dance. Some of these primitive fandangos from Málaga, called Verdiales are still performed nowadays at folkloric gatherings by large non-professional groups called "Pandas", which use a high number of guitars, "bandurrias" (a sort of mandoline), violins, and tambourines.

=== Malagueña styles ===
Some of the traditional malagueña styles (melodic schemes) more frequently performed are listed below. Many though, have been omitted as they are rarely performed or are just variations of other main styles.

1. Juan Breva. He recorded three of his malagueña styles personally in the early 20th century.

2. Enrique el Mellizo. It is often said that he derived his malagueña from the preface to the catholic mass. After his influence, the rhythmic pattern of the malagueña guitar accompaniment was lost and it became a "cante libre". Among the interpreters of this style who helped to establish it we may mention El Niño de la Isla, Aurelio Sellé, Manolo Caracol and Pericón de Cádiz. Each of them has added personal touches to the Malagueña, so it is difficult to know which one resembles the original model most.

3. José Alberto "El Canario". He created one style of Malagueña.

4. Antonio Chacón. He was the most prolific creator of malagueñas and the styles he created are probably the most frequent in recordings. The number of the malagueñas he created varies, though, as some have been attributed to him only by tradition. Some of these styles can often be seen as simple variations. Most of these styles were already recorded by him between 1909 and 1928.

5. La Trini. Her legacy was preserved by singers like Sebastián el Pena. Antonio Chacón created a personal variation of one of her styles.

== The guitar in the malagueña ==
Originally the guitar was, together with other instruments, already part of the accompaniment of folkloric fandango of Málaga. At that time its function was merely rhythmic and limited to the use of one technique, the strumming pattern called "abandolao". As malagueñas slowed down their tempo and professional guitarists came into place, short solos and ornaments were incorporated. The great revolution of the malagueña guitar playing came together with its transformation into a "cante libre": flamenco virtuosos like Ramón Montoya started introducing classical guitar techniques like arpeggio, scales, tremolo, and enriched it with a wider variety of chord positions. They also started introducing short guitar solos in between verses, called falsetas in the flamenco jargon, following the model of other flamenco songs.

Malagueña is rarely performed as a guitar instrumental piece and very rarely danced.

== Musical analysis ==
The singing develops on a major mode (tonic, subdominant, dominant), resolving in the corresponding Phrygian mode of the same scale. The Phrygian mode is used for the short interludes after of before verses. The usual progression is the typical of all fandangos:

- First line of singing: G7, C Major
- Second line: C Major, C7, F Major
- Third line is just a repetition of the first
- Fourth line: C Major, G7
- Fifth line: G7, C Major
- Sixth line: C Major, C7, F Major, G Major, F Major, E Major

To this typical progression other transition chords can be added. For example, D7 is often used in the transition to G Major. A minor often appears in guitar interludes (or even during the singing, as in the case of the Malagueña del Mellizo). These chords can also be transported by using a capo on the guitar, maintaining the same chord positions.

Its melodies are normally lyric in style and very ornate. Malagueña has traditionally been favoured by mellow voices, but there are many exceptions to this rule. Quite often, flamenco singers, after singing several verses of malagueña in "cante libre" style, link directly with the more vivid styles of Fandangos abandolaos.

== Sources ==
- MARTÍN SALAZAR, Jorge: Los cantes flamencos, Diputación Provincial de Granada, 1987
- ÁLVAREZ CABALLERO: 'El cante flamenco', Alianza Editorial, Madrid, 1998
- ROSSY, Hipólito: 'Teoría del cante jondo', Ayuntamiento de Córdoba, 1998
