= Alegrías =

Spanish musical form and folk music from Cádiz

The alegrías (Spanish pronunciation: [aleˈɣɾi.as]) are one of the varieties of flamenco singing and dancing. They are part of the group of cantiñas, which are the songs of Cádiz par excellence.

== Structure ==
Alegrías belongs to the group of palos called cantiñas and it is usually played in a lively rhythm (120-170 beats per minute). The livelier speeds are chosen for dancing, while quieter rhythms are preferred for the song alone. It is similar to soleares. Its beat emphasis is as follows: 1 2 [3] 4 5 [6] 7 [8] 9 [10] 11 [12]. The copla or stanza of the alegrías usually consists of four octosyllabic verses or is the stanza that receives the same name: alegría. Its melody is of festive character and incites to dance. Its rhythm is conditioned by the meter of the soleá, but it differs from it in that its tempo is much faster.

One of the structurally strictest forms of flamenco, a traditional dance in alegrías must contain each of the following sections: a salida (entrance), paseo (walkaround), silencio (similar to an adagio in ballet), castellana (upbeat section) zapateado (literally "a tap of the foot") and bulerías. This structure though, is not followed when alegrías are sung as a standalone song (with no dancing). In that case, the stanzas are combined freely, sometimes together with other types of cantiñas.

== Origin ==
Alegrías (literally meaning "joys") is one of the cante chico forms of flamenco. The alegría seems to derive from the Aragonese jota, which took root in Cadiz during the French occupation and the celebration of the Cortes de Cadiz. That is why its classic lyrics contain so many references to the Virgen del Pilar, the Ebro River, and Navarre.

It is believed that Enrique Butrón fixed the current flamenco style of alegrías and Ignacio Espeleta introduced the characteristic "tiriti, tran, tran...". Some of the best known interpreters of alegrías are Enrique el Mellizo, Chato de la Isla, Pinini, Pericón de Cádiz, Aurelio Sellés, La Perla de Cádiz, Chano Lobato and El Folli.

In Cadiz, the National Competition of Alegrías is held annually.

== Costumes ==
The dancers wear an ankle-length dress with ruffles at the bottom, adorned with ribbons or lace. The sleeves can be long or short, puffed or ruffled. The dancers wear beautiful mantillas embroidered with flowers and long bangs. They complete their attire with flowers, combs, coral earrings and high heels. The use of a bata de cola is also common.

== Sources ==
ÁLVAREZ CABALLERO, Ángel: La discoteca ideal del flamenco, Editorial Planeta, Barcelona, 1995 ISBN 84-08-01602-4
