= Soleá =

Flamenco musical form and style

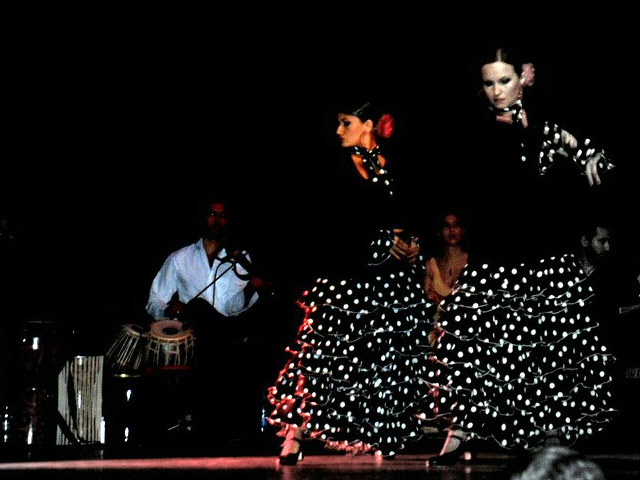
Soleá at concert.

Soleares (plural of soleá, pronounced [soleˈa]) is one of the most basic forms or palos of Flamenco music, probably originating among the Calé Romani people of Cádiz or Seville in Andalusia, the most southern region of Spain. It is usually accompanied by one guitar only, in phrygian mode "por arriba" (fundamental on the 6th string); "Bulerías por soleá" is usually played "por medio" (fundamental on the 5th string). Soleares is sometimes called "mother of palos" although it is not the oldest one (e.g. siguiriyas is older than soleares) and not even related to every other palo (e.g. fandangos family is from a different origin)

== Lyrics ==
When singers sing soleá, as with most palos, they normally choose different "coplas" (stanzas), with different melody, and combine them according to the inspiration of the moment or to a previous plan. Even if the singer has a previous plan, it is often altered on the spur of the moment. These stanzas are independent in subject matter from one another.

The content of the lyrics is generally serious in nature, as appropriate to the solemn air of the music. They often have a sententious tone and convey a feeling of intimate pain. Sometimes despair, more typical of seguiriya, can also appear. However, it is difficult to generalize: sometimes a less serious stanza can turn up in the middle of other serious ones, and irony is frequent.

The stanza of the soleá has three or four lines. In four-line stanzas, the second and fourth line are in assonant rhyme, while the first and third are free. In three-line stanzas, the assonance is between the first and the third. Some examples:

A three-line stanza
No se me daba cuidao
me hago cargo que ha sío un ensueño
y a lo pasaíto pasao.

Translation
I didn't mind
I know it was just a dream
and past things are past.

A four-line stanza
Fui piedra y perdí mi centro
y me arrojaron al mar
y a fuerza de mucho tiempo
mi centro vine a encontrar

Translation
I was a stone and lost my centre
and was thrown into the sea
and after a very long time
I came to find my centre again.

This type of stanza is the cuarteta romanceada, one of the oldest and most frequent in Spanish poetry, and is derived from the medieval "Romance" poetic form, a type of traditional epic poetry that has survived in both learned and popular literature to our days.

The melody of a soleá can demand repeating some lines, altering their logical order, or cutting the lines, sometimes even in the middle of words. For example, as stanza like:

En mis cortas oraciones
le pido a dios llorando
que me quite la salud
y a ti te la vaya dando

Translation
In my short prayers
crying, I ask God
to deprive me of my health
and to give it back to you

Can be rendered in song like:

A Dios llorando yo le pido
le pido a Dios llorando
yo le pido a Dios llorando
que me quite la salud
y a ti te la vaya dando
en mis cortas oraciones
que yo le pido a Dios llorando

== Musical analysis ==
Soleá is one of the flamenco palos with the highest number of traditional songs, and it is particularly appreciated by knowledgeable artists and audiences. It is considered very demanding for singers, as they have to strive to be creative and, at the same time, be respectful of the tradition. They have to succeed in finding a balance between melodic and rhythmic sides, which is said to be extremely difficult. It demands great vocal ability, and the singer is expected to achieve a balance between passion and restraint.

The melody of a soleá stanza usually stays within a limited range (usually not more than a 5th). Its difficulty lies in the use of melisma and microtones, which demand great agility and precision in the voice. It is usual to start a series of soleares with a more restrained stanza in the low register, while continuing to more and more demanding ornaments in a higher register. The series is quite often finished with a stanza in a much more vivid tempo in the relative Major mode.

=== Metre (compás) ===
The metre or "compás" of the soleá is one of the most widely used in Flamenco. Other palos have derived their compás from the soleá, including Bulerías por soleá, the palos in the Cantiñas group, like Alegrías, Romeras, Mirabrás, Caracoles or, to a certain extent, Bulerías. It consists of 12 beats, and could be described as a combination of triple and duple beat bars, so it's a polymetre form, with strong beats at the end of each bar. The basic "skeleton" of the soleá rhythm, thus, follows this pattern:

(Each number represents a beat. Blue squares mean weak beats, while big brown dots are strong beats.)

Nevertheless, this is just an underlying structure, like a foundation, a kind of grid where flamenco artists creatively draw the rhythm by means of subdivisions, articulation, and less commonly, syncopation and accent displacement.

The first example of "palmas" is a very common, simple pattern:

Notice that palmas are often (though by no means always) silent during beats 4 to 6, even if beat number 6 is a "strong one". This is specially true when no dancing takes place: the main interest there is the singing (or playing) and too much percussion can take attention away from the music. Those beats though are often marked when there is dance, or when performing other palos in the same metre like Alegrías or Bulería por soleá. However, these are not to be taken as hard-and-fast rules, but just as general guidelines.

A more complex example.

The small orange squares should be played extremely softly.

The above are just two examples among the variety of variations. When there are two or more people playing palmas, one of them usually plays a base pattern, emphasizing the regular beats, while another plays the upbeats (the "contras", short for "contratiempos").

The soleá can be played rubato, that is, slowing down and speeding up the tempo to enrich its expressive quality. Of course regular tempo is mandatory when it is played and sung to accompany a dancer.

=== Harmonic structure ===
Soléa develops in (altered) Phrygian mode "por arriba" (fundamental on the 6th string), with the III degree of the mode altered to a major 3rd when resolving to I.

To adapt to the singer's vocal range, guitarists can use a "cejilla" (capo) to play in any key while preserving the known chord positions. Modern guitarists often play soleá using other chord positions or even changing the tuning of the guitar to experiment with new sounds, especially in solo instrumental pieces.

The typical flamenco progression iv, III, II, I (an altered Phrygian cadence) is heard several times during the development of the song. In E altered Phrygian, the progression would be Am, G, F, E (the E chord should be Em in a diatonic Phrygian cadence, but its diatonic third – G – is altered to a G♯).

A usual progression with a four-line stanza is the following:

- first line: E^{7}, Am,
- transition to 2nd line: Am, G, (or F, G)
- 2nd line: F, E
- 3rd line: G^{7}, C (or C7)
- 4th line: Am, G, F, E, F, E

And a usual progression with a three-line stanza:

- first line: E^{7}, Am
- 2nd line: G^{7}, C
- 3rd line: Am, G, F, E, F, E

=== Structure of the Soleá form ===
Soleá guitar style is easily identified by its metre and Phrygian mode, but also by a series of characteristic phrases. A guitarist, when playing soleá, will combine:

- "llamadas" (the "call") on the I degree of the Phrygian altered cadence (in E, E major)
- "compas" (the standard accompaniment figure)
- "falseta" (plur. "falsetas"), melodic ideas played between different stanzas.

All sections have an even number of "compas" and are comparable in duration.

== History ==
The origins of this "palo", as with most "palos", is unknown, though has been subject to much speculation. In spite of being one of the most prestigious "palos", the soleá is considered to be relatively new compared to Tonás and Seguiriyas. The earliest known mention of them, referred to as "soledades", is that of Spanish poet Gustavo Adolfo Bécquer, in 1862. The existence of them prior to 1850 is often stated, but has never been proved. Folklorist Demófilo assured, as early as 1879, that they derived from the "coplas de jaleo", a kind festive song style in a very lively rhythm, apparently very popular in the mid 19th century. These facts contradict other views according to which the soleá would be the origin of the rest of flamenco "palos" and was from the beginning a serious and solemn style. In their primitive stages, soléa, as well as jaleo, seem to have been linked to Gypsy environments in several towns of the provinces of Cádiz and Seville.

The golden age of the soleá is considered to be the last quarter of the 19th century, at the time when the "café cantante" (musical café) was the preferential venue for flamenco artists. Most of the soleá melodies we know have been attributed to singers who were active at that time. With the turn of the century, other "palos" like those belonging to the group "cantes libres" like malagueña, tarantas, or Cartageneras took the supremacy. At the times of the "Ópera Flamenca", it was further displaced by Fandangos, popular songs fashioned to the Bulerías rhythm and "cantes de ida y vuelta" like the Guajiras.

During the 1950s to 1970s, at the time of the neo-traditionalism of Antonio Mairena and his school, the style went back into favour, becoming, together with Seguiriyas and Tonás one of the most valued by flamenco artists, critics and public. The soleá went again into disfavour after the birth of New Flamenco. Followers of Camarón de la Isla and his school tend to pay less attention to traditional, "hard" styles, and favour other more festive "palos" like Bulerías or tangos, which are easier to mix with pop and commercial music influences.

== Main soleá styles ==
Soleá "styles" (or rather, we should say "melodies") are traditionally classified under their geographical origin and then by the singer they have been attributed to. These facts are not to be taken as absolute truths. Many times, these attributions rely solely on the oral tradition and the beliefs of singers and the flamenco environment, but rarely on evidence. Even when we know for sure that those singers had an important role in any of these melodies, it cannot be assured that they "created" it. Maybe they just made it popular, or at most developed it.

=== Soleares from Alcalá ===
Although the most recent among the traditional styles, some of the Alcalá ones are the most widely sung. The most famous singer of this area, to whom several styles have been attributed, is Joaquín el de La Paula (1875-1933). His four-line style, sung in the low registers and very restrained, is very often used as an introductory stanza to other more high-pitched ones.

=== Soleares from Triana ===
Triana is a quarter in Seville. They are very difficult to classify, owing to their large number of styles and variations. Most attributions to a particular singer are also doubtful.

- "La Andonda". Very little is known of this Gypsy singer. Some styles of soleá have been attributed to her, but there is no proof that they actually have anything to do with her.
- Styles of El Zurraque. El Zurraque is an area in Triana, where potters used to have their workshops. For this reason, these styles are often called "soleares alfareras" (potters' soleares).
- Soleares from Córdoba. They are supposed to derive from the styles of Ramón El Ollero. They were carried to Córdoba by a singer called Onofre, and are often known as "Soleares de Onofre".

=== Soleares from Cádiz ===
- By Enrique el Mellizo (1848–1906). Several styles have been attributed to this singer, one of the most influential in the evolution of flamenco singing for his contributions to several "palos". Other frequent styles include those of Paquirri.

=== Soleares from Jerez ===
They are considered to be mostly variations from other local styles. However, those by Frijones (probably born in 1846) have original quality.

=== Soleares from Lebrija ===
The most famous are those by singer Juaniquí, of whom there is little reliable information.

=== Soleares from Utrera ===
All styles from Utrera are attributed to La Serneta (1837-1910), a singer born in Jerez, who went to live in Utrera when she was young.

== Sources ==
ÁLVAREZ CABALLERO, Ángel: El cante flamenco, Alianza Editorial, Madrid, 1998

BLAS VEGA, José & RIOS RUIZ, Manuel: Diccionario Enciclopédico Ilustrado del Flamenco, Cinterco, 1988

ÁLVAREZ CABALLERO, Ángel: La discografía ideal del flamenco, Planeta, Barcelona 1995

MARTÍN SALAZAR, Jorge: Los cantes flamencos, Diputación Provincial de Granada
