= Bulerías =

Spanish musical form, Latin musical form

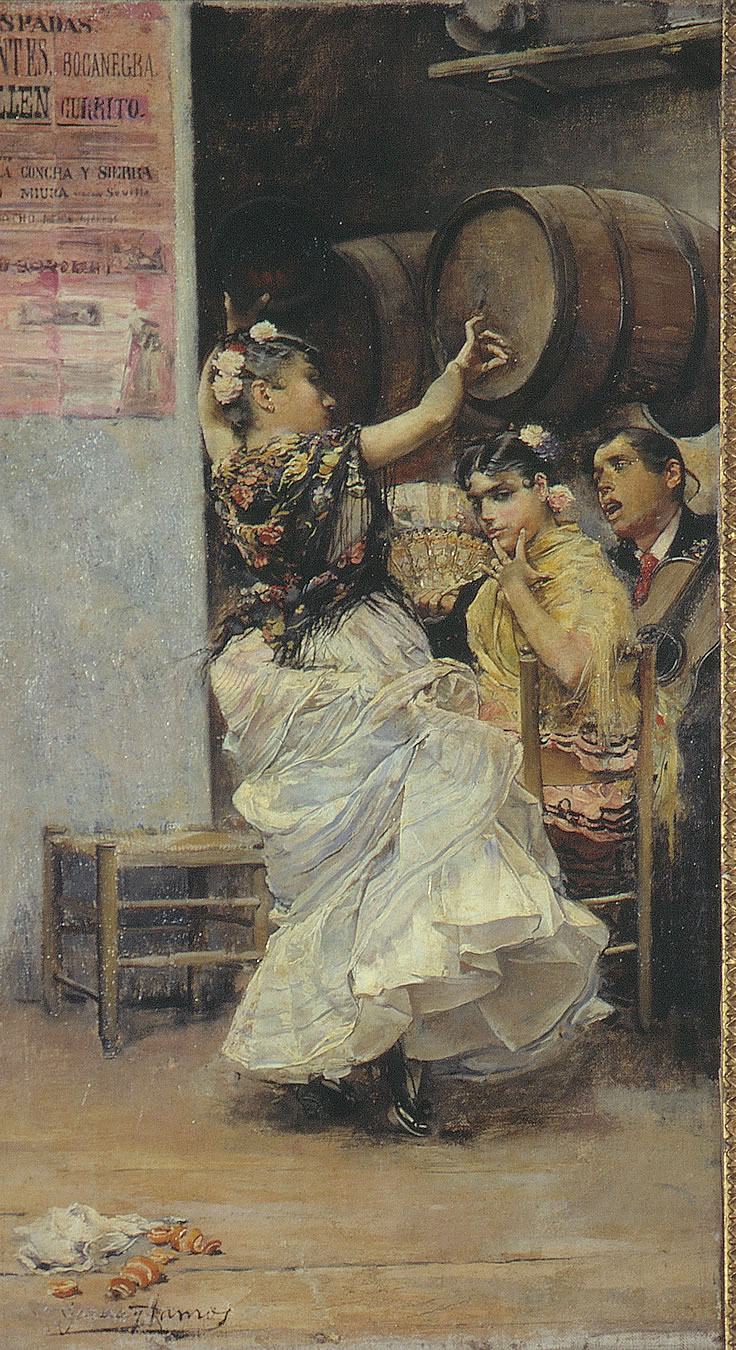
José García Ramos. Baile por Bulerías. 1884

Bulería (Spanish pronunciation: [buleˈɾia]; interchangeable with the plural, bulerías) is a fast flamenco rhythm made up of a 12 beat cycle with emphasis in two general forms as follows:

[12] 1 2 [3] 4 5 [6] 7 [8] 9 [10] 11
or
[12] 1 2 [3] 4 5 6 [7] [8] 9 [10] 11

This may be thought of as a measure of 6/8 followed by a measure of 3/4 (known as hemiola).

For dancers, it is commonly viewed with a compas or bar of 6 counts as opposed to 12.

Flamenco Bulerías with emphasis as [12] 1 2 [3] 4 5 [6] 7 [8] 9 [10] 11

An interesting counting method has been used by Pepe Romero, in his book Classical Guitar Style and Technique, which is 2 measures of 3/4 time followed by 3 measures of 2/4 time. This puts the emphasis on the last beat of each measure:

1 2 [3] 1 2 [3] 1 [2] 1 [2] 1 [2]

When performed, the bulería always starts on beat twelve of the compas, so the accented beat is heard first.

It is normally played at 195-240 beats per minute, most commonly in an A-phrygian mode (por medio) with a sharpened third to make A major the root chord. A typical rasgueado pattern involves only the A and B♭ chords, were golpes are used to accent the chords as follows:

[A] — — [B♭] — — [B♭] —[B♭] —[A]—

Although professional players often intersperse other chords, in more traditional playing variations of chords from the Andalusian cadence are utilised and modern players, influenced by jazz may use a greater variety of chord patterns and variations.

It originated among the Calé Romani people of Jerez during the 19th century, originally as a fast, upbeat ending to soleares or alegrias. It is among the most popular and dramatic of the flamenco forms and often ends any flamenco gathering. The name bulerías comes from the Spanish word burlar, meaning "to mock" or bullería, "racket, shouting, din". It is the style which permits the greatest freedom for improvisation, the metre playing a crucial role in this. Speed and agility are required and total control of rhythm as well as strength in the feet which are used in intricate tapping with toe, heel and the ball of the foot.
(See also tap dance.)

== Cante (singing) ==
When sung, the bulería has three or four octosyllabic lines. It is sometimes subdivided into bulerías al golpe and bulerías ligadas. The former is slower while the latter is frantic.

There are many styles of Buleria depending on the region of Spain from which it originated. For example: Buleria de Lebrija, Buleria de Jerez (possibly the most commonly used style), Buleria de Cadiz, Buleria de Utrera etc.

== Featured performers ==
=== Singers ===
- La Niña de los Peines
- La Paquera de Jerez
- Bernarda de Utrera

Since 1975:

- Camarón de la Isla
- Carmen Linares
- José Mercé

=== Guitarists ===
- Sabicas
- Paco de Lucia
- Paco Cepero
- Paco Peña
- Vicente Amigo
- Moraíto Chico II
- Tomatito

== See also ==
- Premio al Toque por Bulerías
