= Tango (flamenco) =

Flamenco palo

Tango, more commonly called tangos in flamenco usage, is one of the palos of flamenco. It is a lively form in binary or quadruple metre and is considered one of the basic styles of flamenco. Tangos may be sung, played on the guitar, or danced, and are closely related to tientos, which use the same basic compás at a slower tempo.

Although the name is shared with Argentine tango, flamenco tangos are a distinct Andalusian flamenco form. The Instituto Andaluz del Flamenco places the likely early development of the palo between Cádiz and Seville and explicitly rejects a direct relationship with Argentine tango.

Tango_de_triana
Traditional tango de Triana.

== Etymology and terminology ==
In flamenco, the palo is normally referred to in the plural as tangos. Performers commonly say that a singer, guitarist or dancer performs por tangos, meaning in the style or compás of tangos. The singular tango may be used in general description, but the plural is the usual name of the palo in flamenco contexts.

The etymology of the Spanish musical and dance term tango is uncertain. The current Diccionario de la lengua española of the Real Academia Española marks this sense of the word as perhaps onomatopoeic, and distinguishes it from another word tango meaning a game-piece, derived from an old form of tañer. The dictionary gives separate definitions for several musical and dance uses of the word, including the Rioplatense tango and the flamenco palo.

Earlier lexicographic and historical sources show that the word circulated in several musical and dance contexts before the international spread of Argentine tango. Ewa Stała, summarizing earlier etymological scholarship, notes that Corominas regarded an onomatopoeic origin as probable, while other writers have proposed African origins. Stała also notes that the 1869 edition of the RAE dictionary defined tango as a meeting and dance of the Roma, and that nineteenth-century usage could apply tango or tanguillo to a variety of flamenco song from Cádiz as well as to the habanera.

Flamenco writers have also pointed to early Andalusian documentation of the word. José Blas Vega cited an 1814 Cádiz manuscript, Apuntes para la descripción de la ciudad de Cádiz, in which tango appears in connection with popular dances and festivities in Cádiz. This supports treating the flamenco use of tangos as part of a broader nineteenth-century Spanish and transatlantic vocabulary of popular song and dance, rather than as a term derived from Argentine tango.

The word was also used in Argentina before Argentine tango emerged as a distinct genre. Christine Denniston notes that the first piece of music published in Argentina using the description tango, Toma maté, ché in 1857, probably used the term to refer to tango andaluz, or Andalusian tango, a Spanish musical style popular in Buenos Aires in the mid-nineteenth century.

This earlier use of the word tango should not be confused with Argentine tango, which later developed as a distinct Río de la Plata music and dance tradition.

== Form and compás ==
Tangos are usually described as being in 4/4 or binary metre. The Instituto Andaluz del Flamenco describes them as a cante executed in 4/4 and notes that they may be performed in a variety of tonalities. In practical flamenco teaching, tangos are usually counted in four-beat cycles, with a steady and danceable pulse.

A simple count may be represented as:

1 2 3 4

or, in an eight-count pedagogical cycle:

1 2 3 4 5 6 7 8

These counts are teaching devices rather than fixed notation. In performance the compás is shaped by guitar strumming, palmas, footwork, llamadas, remates and the phrasing of the cante.

The rhythmic character of tangos distinguishes them from rumba flamenca. Rumba often has a more flowing, open and syncopated guitar accompaniment, while tangos usually have a more clearly marked flamenco compás. Tangos also differ from tanguillos, despite the similar name; tanguillos have their own rhythmic and historical identity, especially in Cádiz carnival and flamenco traditions.

== Poetic form ==
The poetic form of tangos is commonly a copla of three or four octosyllabic lines. In practice, flamenco singers may repeat individual lines, reorder text, stretch syllables, or insert short refrains and vocables. As with other flamenco palos, the performed structure of the letra is not always identical to the written stanza.

The content of tangos letras is very broad. Some letras are festive, humorous or dance-oriented; others deal with love, jealousy, family, poverty, prison, insult, local pride or sorrow. Because tangos are often used in social and dance contexts, the texts can be direct, compact and rhythmically effective.

A well-known letra associated with Triana is:

Triana, Triana,
qué bonita está Triana,
qué bonita está Triana,
cuando le ponen al puente
la banderita gitana.

This type of letra shows the close connection between tangos and local identity. Many regional tangos preserve references to neighborhoods, towns, artists, occupations or particular performance traditions.

== History and origins ==
The exact origin of flamenco tangos is uncertain. The Instituto Andaluz del Flamenco states that the main theories place the early development of the palo between Cádiz and Seville, and suggests that tangos may derive from older nineteenth-century dance songs that gradually developed into the flamenco form now known by that name.

The same source describes tangos as a cante in 4/4 metre with varied regional and personal modalities, including styles associated with Cádiz, Triana, Jerez, Málaga and Granada. Early interpreters named by the Instituto Andaluz del Flamenco include Enrique el Mellizo and Aurelio Sellés in Cádiz; Pastora Pavón, El Titi and other singers in Seville and Triana; Frijones and El Mojama in Jerez; and La Pirula, La Repompa and El Piyayo in Málaga.

== Relation to Argentine tango ==
Flamenco tangos and Argentine tango share a name and some broad historical vocabulary, but they are different musical and dance traditions. The Instituto Andaluz del Flamenco describes flamenco tangos as a basic flamenco style, probably formed from older nineteenth-century dance songs, performed in 4/4 and associated especially with Cádiz and Seville; it explicitly says that a relationship with Argentine tango is to be discarded.

Musicological writing on Argentine tango has nevertheless discussed the possible role of tango andaluz among the many nineteenth-century forms circulating around the Atlantic. Pablo Kohan criticizes overly simple origin stories in which Argentine tango is imagined as a mixture of "candombe", "milonga", "habanera" and "tango andaluz", arguing that such explanations often lack a clear methodology. Kohan instead summarizes the better-supported view of the Antología del tango rioplatense, according to which the term tango was widely used in the Americas as a synonym for the habanera, an American dance created through the mixture of European, especially contradanza, elements.

For that reason, the relationship between flamenco tangos and Argentine tango is better described as indirect and historical rather than as a direct equivalence. Andalusian tango, habanera, milonga and candombe all appear in discussions of the musical environment from which Argentine tango emerged, but flamenco tangos remained a flamenco palo with its own compás, performance practice and regional styles.

== Tonality and harmony ==
Tangos can be performed in different tonal frameworks. The Instituto Andaluz del Flamenco notes that tangos associated with El Titi de Triana are often sung in minor tonalities, those of Cádiz are accompanied in modal flamenco tonalities, and those of Málaga or El Piyayo tend toward major tonalities.

In guitar accompaniment, tangos often use clear, repeated harmonic patterns that support dance and cante. The exact harmony depends on the regional style, the singer's register, and the guitarist's chosen position. A modal tangos accompaniment may emphasize the Andalusian cadence and the flamenco Phrygian sound, while other tangos may use major or minor tonalities.

For example, a simplified modal framework might move around the flamenco cadence:

iv – III – II – I

while tangos in major or minor tonalities may use more conventional dominant-tonic relationships. These examples are only schematic; flamenco guitarists vary the accompaniment constantly with rasgueados, cierres, llamadas, remates, falsetas and responses to the singer or dancer.

== Guitar accompaniment ==
The guitar accompaniment for tangos is highly rhythmic. It usually marks the compás with rasgueado patterns, golpes, bass accents and short cadential phrases. Because tangos are frequently danced, the guitarist must coordinate closely with the dancer's llamadas, escobillas, remates and tempo changes.

A typical accompaniment may include:

- a short guitar introduction;
- a marked compás pattern;
- llamada material to bring in the singer or dancer;
- accompaniment for one or more letras;
- falsetas between sung lines or dance sections;
- remates and cierres;
- a final acceleration or closing passage.

Tangos are often accessible to students because of their four-beat pulse, but advanced accompaniment requires strong compás control. The guitarist must maintain the groove while leaving space for cante, dance cues and improvisatory variation.

== Cante ==
In cante, tangos combine rhythmic drive with melodic flexibility. The singer must fit the letra into the compás while still giving the lines expressive shape. Compared with slower forms such as soleá or seguiriyas, tangos usually have a more compact phrasing, but they can still carry serious emotional content.

The cante may be performed in several local styles. Cádiz tangos, Triana tangos, Jerez tangos, Málaga tangos and Granada tangos each have different melodic profiles and performance associations. Some styles are strongly dance-oriented, while others are more suited to listening.

Tangos are also an adaptable form. Modern singers often use the tangos compás to interpret newly composed lyrics, popular songs or hybrid material. This adaptability is one reason tangos remain common in contemporary flamenco performances.

== Dance ==
Tangos are one of the most important flamenco dance forms. Their steady compás, moderate-to-fast tempo and clear accents make them suitable for both traditional social dancing and staged choreography. The dance may be festive, sensual, humorous, elegant or forceful, depending on the local style and the dancer's interpretation.

A danced tangos performance may include:

- entrada or salida;
- llamada;
- one or more letras;
- marking steps and body movement during the cante;
- remates at the ends of sung lines;
- escobilla or footwork section;
- subida or acceleration;
- final cierre.

Compared with more solemn forms, tangos often allow a freer and more playful relationship between dancer, singer and guitarist. The dancer may respond to the singer's text, interrupt the compás with remates, or use humorous gestures. In tablao settings, tangos are frequently used near the end of a performance because they create a lively atmosphere and invite direct communication with the audience.

== Palmas and jaleo ==
Palmas are central to tangos. The clapping usually reinforces the four-beat pulse and helps maintain the compás for the singer, guitarist and dancer. Depending on the tempo and atmosphere, palmas may be simple and grounded or more syncopated and playful.

Jaleo, including short cries of encouragement and rhythmic vocal interjections, is also common. In a social or tablao setting, tangos can become highly participatory: singers, dancers, guitarists and bystanders may all contribute palmas, jaleo and short responses.

This participatory quality is one of the reasons tangos are so important in flamenco gatherings. They are structured enough to preserve compás, but flexible enough to allow spontaneous verses, dance interjections and personal expression.

== Regional and personal variants ==
Flamenco tangos are not a single fixed melody, but a family of related forms. The Instituto Andaluz del Flamenco lists important modalities from Cádiz, Triana, Jerez and Málaga, and also mentions a Granadan form performed por arriba at a slower pace. These variants may differ in melody, tempo, tonal centre, dance usage and local association.

=== Tangos de Cádiz ===
Tangos de Cádiz are among the best-known regional styles. The Instituto Andaluz del Flamenco names Enrique El Mellizo and Aurelio Sellés as early interpreters associated with Cádiz tangos. Cádiz styles are commonly linked with a modal flamenco sound, and they often have a lively, direct and danceable character.

Cádiz tangos may be used in both cante and dance. They are often associated with local wit, rhythmic clarity and a strong relationship to the broader Cádiz family of festive palos. Their compás and melodic shape make them suitable for performance in tablaos, theatres and informal gatherings.

=== Tangos de Triana ===
Tangos de Triana are associated with the Triana district of Seville, a historically important flamenco neighbourhood. The Instituto Andaluz del Flamenco associates Triana tangos with Pastora Pavón, La Niña de los Peines, and El Titi.

Triana tangos may be sung in minor tonalities, especially in styles associated with El Titi de Triana. They are often understood as strongly connected with dance. Their performance character can range from solemn and sensual to humorous and festive.

=== Tangos de Jerez ===
Tangos de Jerez are associated with Jerez de la Frontera, one of the central cities of flamenco. The Instituto Andaluz del Flamenco names Frijones and El Mojama as early interpreters connected with Jerez tangos.

Jerez tangos are part of a broader Jerez rhythmic culture that also includes bulerías, soleá and other palos. Their performance often emphasizes strong compás, earthy delivery and close interaction between cante and dance.

=== Tangos de Málaga ===
Tangos de Málaga include styles associated with La Pirula, La Repompa and El Piyayo. The tangos of El Piyayo are especially distinctive and are often linked with major tonalities.

El Piyayo's tangos are sometimes described as having a melodic flavour distinct from other tangos, partly because of their major-mode colour and their association with Málaga. The letras may refer to poverty, prison, travel or personal experience. Tangos associated with La Repompa and La Pirula have a different character and are often valued for their unmistakable Málaga identity.

=== Tangos de Granada ===
Tangos de Granada form another important branch of the palo. The Instituto Andaluz del Flamenco notes a Granada modality performed por arriba and at a slower rhythm. Granada tangos are closely associated with local flamenco practice, especially in the Sacromonte and other performance environments.

Granada tangos may be performed in gatherings, staged shows and dance contexts. Their tempo and character vary, but they often preserve a recognizable local flavour.

=== Tangos extremeños ===
Tangos extremeños are associated with Extremadura and with artists who developed or popularized local ways of singing tangos. Although not listed in the short Instituto Andaluz del Flamenco summary, they are widely recognized in flamenco practice as an important regional branch of the palo. They are often linked with a raw, direct and rhythmically powerful style of singing.

Because the category is broad and not always sharply defined, individual singers and local traditions are especially important in identifying tangos extremeños.

== Relationship to tientos ==
Tangos and tientos are among the clearest examples of related flamenco palos. The Instituto Andaluz del Flamenco defines tientos as having the same compás as tangos but a slower rhythm. Tientos are generally more solemn, slower and more spacious, while tangos are faster and more festive or danceable.

In performance, the two forms are often joined. A singer or dancer may begin with tientos and then accelerate into tangos. This creates a dramatic contrast: the tientos section allows expressive, slower development, while the tangos ending brings rhythmic release and a livelier atmosphere.

This relationship also makes tangos important pedagogically. Students often learn tangos and tientos together because they share a rhythmic basis while requiring different expressive approaches.

== Relationship to rumba flamenca ==
Tangos are sometimes compared with rumba flamenca because both are binary-metre flamenco forms and both can be lively and danceable. However, they are distinct palos. Rumba flamenca generally has a more flowing and syncopated guitar pattern, while tangos more strongly emphasize the marked flamenco compás.

Rumba also has a different historical development, including strong connections with Cuban and Afro-Cuban rhythmic materials and twentieth-century popular flamenco. Tangos, by contrast, are usually treated as one of the basic traditional flamenco styles, with roots in nineteenth-century Andalusian dance songs.

== Relationship to tanguillos ==
Despite the similar name, tanguillos are not simply small tangos. Tanguillos, especially those from Cádiz, have their own rhythm, history and performance conventions. The Instituto Andaluz del Flamenco connects tanguillos de Cádiz with local popular and carnival traditions as well as flamenco performance.

The distinction is important because the terms can be confusing to beginners. Tangos are a basic flamenco palo in 4/4 or binary metre; tanguillos have a more particular Cádiz identity and a different rhythmic feel.

== Relationship to other binary-metre palos ==
Tangos belong to a wider group of flamenco forms in binary or quadruple metre. Other palos often discussed near tangos include farruca, garrotín, rumba flamenca, tientos and tanguillos. These forms may share a broad metrical environment, but each has its own musical identity.

The farruca is usually more solemn, often played in a minor key, and traditionally associated with male dance. The garrotín is often lighter and more theatrical. Rumba flamenca has a more flowing and popular character. Tientos are slower and more serious, while tangos are generally faster and more festive.

== Performance contexts ==
Tangos are performed in many flamenco contexts. In a traditional gathering, they may appear as a social and participatory form, with palmas, jaleo and short dance interventions. In a tablao, they may serve as a lively number near the end of a set. In theatre, they may be choreographed as part of a larger dance work.

Because tangos can support cante, dance and guitar solos, they are highly adaptable. A singer may perform a sequence of regional tangos; a dancer may use tangos for a complete choreography; a guitarist may play a concert piece based on tangos compás and falsetas.

The form is also common in flamenco teaching. Its four-beat pulse makes it easier for beginners to hear than twelve-beat palos such as soleá or bulerías, while its expressive and regional variety makes it rich enough for advanced study.

== Modern use ==
In modern flamenco, tangos remain one of the most flexible palos. They are used by traditional singers, dance companies, guitarists, fusion groups and popular flamenco artists. Their compás can support traditional letras as well as newly written songs.

Some modern performances preserve clearly identifiable regional styles, such as Cádiz, Triana, Jerez, Málaga or Granada tangos. Others use the tangos rhythm more generally as a framework for original material. This adaptability has helped tangos remain central in contemporary flamenco while still preserving links with older local traditions.

== Example lyrics ==
Triana, Triana,
qué bonita está Triana, (Triana, how beautiful it is!)
qué bonita está Triana, qué bonita está Triana
cuando le ponen al puente
la banderita gitana (when we put the gypsy banners on the bridge.)

== See also ==
- Palo (flamenco)
- Tientos (flamenco)
- Tanguillos
- Rumba flamenca
- Farruca
- Garrotín
- Argentine tango
- Flamenco guitar
- Flamenco dance
