= Glossary of flamenco terms =

This is a glossary of terms that relate to flamenco arts.

== A ==
aficionado
one interested in flamenco ('afición' a liking for)
aflamencado
flamencoized
a golpe
A tap, it can refer to a particular footstep by the dancer or a tap on the guitar, but it can also just refer to any tap (i.e. tapping the table in compás)
alboreá
the Gypsy wedding song sung in the soleá compás
alegrías
festive compás of the cantiñas group; one of the cantes chicos
alzapúa
guitar-playing technique that uses solely the thumb
ángel
see duende
a palo seco
without accompaniment
apodo
nickname, which Gypsies receive for life
arranque
spontaneous outbursts of uncontrolled emotion that a performer may emit
a seco
playing the guitar rasgueado, with the fingers of the left hand damping the strings
atravesarse
for the guitarist - cutting corners and rhythm during a falseta, making the dancer's job difficult

== B ==
babeio
repeated meaningless sounds such as 'bababa' in the middle of words
bailaor, bailaora
flamenco dancer (male, female), as opposed to 'bailarin', which is any other dancer.
baile
flamenco dance; other (non-flamenco) types are referred to as 'danza'
baile de mantón
a dance with a shawl
balanceo y vaivén
swaying of the body and hips. Balanceo is gentle; vaiven is violent
bamberas
song form for swings
bata de cola
dress with a train (literally: "gown [of/with] a tail")
bonito
"pretty"; in other words, not good flamenco
braceo
a dancer's use of the arms
bulerías
song form; an evolving rhythm that started about a century ago
bullanguero
festive; adjectival form of bulerias

== C ==
cabal
final version of the siguiriya; literally, honest, exact, complete.
café cantante
prime venue for flamenco in the 19th century
cambio
change of key and lightening of tone to end a song
campanilleras
songs that originally came from a religious brotherhood who would go to prayers to the sound of handbells - hence the name, which means "bellringers"
cantaor, cantaora
flamenco singer (male, female); other singers are often called a 'cantantes'
cante
flamenco song; other (non-flamenco) songs are cantos
cante pa'adelante
literally, "singing from in front"; singing not done for dancers, often with the singer seated [pa = "por"]
cante pa'atras
literally, "singing from behind"; singing for dancers, often with the singer standing [pa = "por"]
cantes de ida y vuelta
songs brought back from Latin America
cantes de levante
songs from the eastern province of Grandada, Jaen, Almeria, and Murcia
caracoles
a song form which started as a street snail-vendor's song in Zarzuela (a popular Spanish form of operetta)
cartageneras
song form derived from the taranta, with a florid vocal line, more "artistic" and decorative than forceful and rough
castañuelas
castanets
cejilla
capotasto or capo, used by guitarists to raise tone of all strings; a mechanical 'barré'
chufla
any festive and frivolous song
cierre
close of a series of steps or a line of song
coba
flattery, often with something false in it
coletilla
a short form of estribillo
compás
a measure or bar; flamencos use the word to mean both (a) the name of the type of twelve-count and (b) the rhythmic skill of a performer
contratiempo
cross-rhythms; including syncopation and rubato
copla
verse of cante flamenco, as against the cuple of a (non-flamenco) canto
coraje
a way of performing that shows impetuosity or daring (lit. "courage")
corrido
ballad, or also a romance
corte
the way the singer ends a musical phrase
crótalo
Phoenician and Roman form of castanets
cuadro
a flamenco troupe

== D ==
debla
a form of toná. It is an old song form, now seldom used
dejes
the way the singer ends a phrase
desgarro
literally "tear, rip"; wilderness, heartbreak
desplante
technically, a point in the dance that marks the end of a section. In fact, a high point, a climax in the dance at which the dancer pauses and the audience applauds
desplazamiento: see marcar
diapasón
the neck or fingerboard of the guitar
ducas, duquelas
Caló (Romany or Gypsi) word for "sorrows"
duende
literally, "spirit" of "demon"; suggesting possession. Flamencos may prefer the word ángel or el age

== E ==
escobilla
literally "broom"; the section of a dance in which the bailaor/a does an extended zapateados
escuela bolera
a graceful and balletic form of the old bolero; dance in 3/4 time popular in the last century
estampa
look, appearance by the stance, positioning, form, and dress
estribillo
short phrases sung repeatedly at the end of a song; the last section of a dance done with singing, where the cantaor/a sings while the baile is danced; see 'coletilla'

== F ==
falsetas
solo passages on the guitar, short melodies played at the start and between verses of a song
fandangos
an old family of song forms; thought to be of Moorish in origin; very popular in the early/mid 20th century
farruca
folk song adopted from northern Spain (Galicia), now above all a dance; once "only performed by men"
figura
a star; a performer who has achieved a name and fame

== G ==
gachó
Caló (Gypsy or Romany) word for non-Gypsy (compare payo)
gancho
literally a "hook"; by extension, anything that gets to you, that "hooks" you
garra
literally "claws"; guts, force
garrotín
song adopted from northern Spain (Asturias)
gesto
tapping the face of the guitar with the second and/or third finger while playing
granaína
form of Fandango in free rhythm that in many ways stands apart, from Granada
guajira
an ida y vuelta song; now meaning "girl", word from Yucateca, a native language of Cuba
guasa
joking in bad taste, rustic trickiness
guitarrero
guitar builder

== I ==
ir con tiento
to move slowly

== J ==
jaberas
form of Fandango from Malaga
jalear
to stimulate a performer, to encourage with words and/or palmas
jaleo
vocal encouragement given to performers, when the audience calls out such phrases as ezo!, arsa!, olé!, toma!, vamo
jarana
"spree" when a group enjoys themselves doing flamenco
jipio
a cry (such as ay) used by the singer to find his pitch or simply put into the middle of a song
jondo
the Gypsy pronunciation on hondo (deep); formerly applied to the song forms, but now used often to describe a manner of singing
juerga
a lively flamenco party, often with only cante a golpe.

== L ==
letra
copla of a song taken at its literary value; section of a dance when the cantaor/a is singing the lyrics, doing the tercios
ligado
in guitar, sounding the note with the fingers of the left hand only
llamada
literally "call"; the opening of a dance

== M ==
macho
usually a three-line verse used as remate to the siguiriya; usually in a major key
malagueñas
song form characterized by its sad, elegiac tone. The city and province of Malaga are considered the home of the flamenco fandango
mutis
the exit made off the stage by the bailaor(a)s
marcar
to mark time, done by bailaor(a)s, usually while the cantaor(a) is singing; 'marcajes'; see desplazamientos
martinetes
songs of the blacksmith, can be performed to the rhythm of hammers beating an anvil; in compás similar to the siguiriya
melisma
series of notes sung on a single syllable of the coplas. To the ear unaccustomed to it, the sound may seem like unmusical wailing
milonga
a type of folk song from the Río de la Plata area of Argentina, where it is still very popular
mineras
best described as watered-down tarantas
mote
see apodo
mudanza
see punteado

== N ==
nanas
lullabyes

== O ==
oposición
refers to the asymmetry of flamenco; e.g., in dance, if the arms are going one way the face will look the other

== P ==
Palillos
flamenco name for castanets
palmas
hand clapping. It is intricate art, requiring skill and knowledge of compas.
palmas altas
percussive effect performed with the fingers of the right hand on the left palm, resulting in a sharp sound; also called palmas claras and palmas agudas
palmas sordas
muted clapping done with cupped hands (often by the singer); also called palmas graves
palmero
performer of palmas
palo
song form; literally, a suit of cards. Palos fall into two main categories: those done in free rhythm (sin compás) and those done in rhythm (con compás)
paso
step or a series of steps
payo
sometimes thought to be the Calo (Romany or Gypsy) word for non-Gypsy, but in fact prison slang for an easy mark, a sucker. The Calo word for non-Gypsy is gachó
pellizco
literally, "nip, pinch"; that quality (usually in a dancer) that turns you on
peña
flamenco club
peteneras
Legendary or real, la Petenera was a girl from Cadiz, notorious for her beauty and hardness of heart. A 19th century writer mentions hearing 'peteneras' sung in a voice that conveyed "inexplicable sadness."
picar
to pluck on a guitar
pitos
finger snapping
playero
lamenting
por arriba
on guitar - in the hand position for the key of E
por medio
on guitar - in the hand position for the key of A
punteando
steps and movements that are not part of the zapateado, including 'paseo' (walking steps) and 'mudanzas' (more complicated movements, lit. "variations")

== R ==
rasgueado
on guitar, a drumroll effect created by using the backs of the fingers, i.e., the fingernails, striking the strings one after another (held back by the thumb)
remate
way of ending a song, either by raising a pitch, changing to the major, or simply speeding up, in a strong decisive manner
roas
Sacromonte form of the alboreá (wedding song)
romances
songs (ballads) in a form of toná, now when done with a guitar, it is usually played in a soleá rhythm
romeras
songs of a girl traveling on a pilgrimage
rumbas
a song form influenced by Cuban rumba

== S ==
Sacromonte
a hillside in Granada with cave dwellings, in which Gypsies used to live. It was one of the heartlands of Gypsy flamenco, with a style all its own
salida
start of the baile (literally, going or coming out)
saeta
a song of passionate devotion to Christ or the Virgin, often aflamencao
sevillanas
non-flamenco song that has been flamencoized in various ways due to its popularity, including the hand and arm movements of the dancers
siguiriyas
heart of cante jondo (deep song). It expresses anguish, lament and despair, and has been described as an outcry against fate and the quintessence of tragic song
soleares
As song, the soleá lies at the heart of flamenco, together with siguiriyas and toná. As dance, it stands alone—at least for women
son
all sound accompanying the flamenco song: guitar, palmas (clapping), pitas (finger snappin), knuckle tapping
sonanta
flamenco slang for guitar
soniquete
literally, "droning"; it is applied to performers being what-jazz-players-call "in the groove"

== T ==
tablao
the venue for a tourist-oriented flamenco show
tablas
literally, "boards"; the stage on which the dance is performed; tiene tablas means "to be an experienced performer"
tangos
probably the oldest flamenco song form in a simple rhythm of 2/4 time, as reflected in the time beaten by the palmeros; not the same as "el tango argentino"
tanguillos
songs of Cadiz; festive, light, sometimes mocking, and always suitable for Carnival
tapa
the face of the guitar
tarantas
a mining song of free rhythm and by far the hardest to sing, demanding tragic intensity as well as unusual control, both vocal and artistic, in the melismas
templar
to tune
temple
tuning or temperament
temporeas
songs of the farm - harvesting and threshing songs
tercio
a short section (musical phrase, line of verse); lit. "third"
tientos
a song form, similar to the tango
tocaor, tocaora
guitarist; from "tocar" (to play)
toná
oldest flamenco, gypsy-Andalusian song, probably from romances or corridas
toque
guitar playing
torsión y convulsión
stages, usually in the soleá, wherein the dancer reaches a more or less ecstatic state
trémolo
on guitar, playing high notes with the fingers (or bass notes with the thumb) in quick succession (back and forth) to make a continuous sound
Triana
the traditional Gypsy quarter of Sevilla, now yuppified

== V ==
vibrato
repeated meaningless sounds uttered during the song, such as jajaja, but unlike babeo, not within a word
vito
Andalucian folk song and dance in fast 3/8 time (non-flamenco)
voz afillá
hoarse voice like that of El Fillo, a 19th-century singer; this quality is also known as rajo

== Z ==
zambra
(a) a form of Sacromonte tangos, (b) a noisy fiesta originally of the Moors
zapateo, zapateado
the form of "tap" dancing peculiar to flamenco; from zapato [shoe]
zorongo
an old song and dance in 2/4 time (not flamenco), revived by Federico Garcia Lorca; also called 'zarongo'

== Bibliography ==
- Andres Batista, Maestros y Estilos. Manual Flamenco (Madrid: Graficas Agenjo 1985); alphabetically arranged.
- Irving Brown, Deep Song (New York: Macmillan 1929); glossary at 337-346.
- Anselmo González Climent, Flamencología (Madrid: Editorial Escelicer 1955, 2d ed. 1964).
- Paul Hecht, The Wind Cried (New York: The Dial Press 1968); glossary at 177-180.
- Julian Pemartin, El Cante Flamenco. Guia alfabetica (Madrid: Edita Afrodisio Aguado 1966); alphabetic guide.
- D. E. Pohren, The Art of Flamenco (Madrid: Society of Spanish Studies 1962, 1990); glossary at 121-124.
- Barbara Thiel-Cramér, Flamenco (Lidingö, Sweden: Remark 1990), English translation 1991; glossary at 147-152.
- Robin Totton, Song of the Outcasts (Portland, Oregon: Amadeus 2003); glossary at 189-199.
