= Merche Esmeralda =

Spanish choreographer and flamenco dancer

- Born: Mercedes Rodríguez Gamero; 1947/50; Seville, Spain
- Education: Adelita Domingo Academy
- Occupations: flamenco dancer; choreographer

Merche Esmeralda (née, Mercedes Rodríguez Gamero; Seville, 1947/50) is a Spanish flamenco dancer (bailaora) and choreographer. In 2007, she was the recipient of the Fundación Cruzcampo "Compás del Cante" Award; this award is always referred to by the Spanish media as the "Flamenco Nobel prize".

== Early life and education ==
Mercedes Rodríguez Gamero was born in Seville, Spain in 1947 or 1950.

While still a child, around 1959, Merche Esmeralda began singing and dancing at the Adelita Domingo academy in Seville. After that, she attended the schools of Enrique el Cojo and Matilde Coral. When her family could no longer raise money for her education, she learned by observing and imitating famous artists such as El Farruco.

== Career ==
=== Early success ===
Eventually, she was ready to move to Madrid and earn some money there so she could finance her further education and even support her family. In 1963, she made her debut at the Teatro San Fernando in a couple of matinees called Galas Juveniles. Immediately afterward, she professionalized as a dancer in classical Spanish dance shows, dancing in the most important tablaos of the time: in Seville at the Cortijo el Guajiro, in Madrid at El Duende, the tablao of Pastora Imperio and at Las Brujas, where she continued until the 1970s, reappearing again and again. She also danced at Los Castaneros, Café de Chinitas, and Venta del Gato before returning to her hometown of Seville to dance at Los Gallos.

In 1966, Merche Esmeralda performed at the Mairena del Alcor Festival. Antonio Mairena saw her dance and joined her as a singer. The joint performance gave her access to the important festivals of the time: the Festival del Cante de las Minas in La Unión, the Gazpacho de Morón, the Caracolá de Lebrija, and the Festival de la Bulería in Jerez de la Frontera. Two years later, she competed at the Concurso Nacional de Arte Flamenco in Córdoba and won the La Argentinita prize. She shared it with Matilde Coral, her former teacher. With Coral, the Spanish television studios opened up for Merche Esmeralda, and with Coral, she had her first appearance abroad. In 1969, she took part in the last performance that took place at the Teatro de San Fernando in Seville before it closed. She surprised audiences with her sophisticated interpretation of Tarantos.

Nevertheless, she strived for further perfection. In 1970, she studied Spanish dance with Mariemma, Victoria Eugenia, and Raquel Lucas, as well as classical ballet with José Granero and Karen Taft, and regional dance with Pedro Azorín.

In 1972, she won the Premio Nacional de Baile of the Cátedras de Flamencología de Jerez. In 1973, she was appointed professor of dance. In 1977, she was awarded the prize for the best foreign dancer in Cremona, Italy. In 1978, she appeared in the television show Horas doradas in a double capacity as a dancer and presenter. In 1979, she finally founded her first company, for which she was able to gain Manolete, El Güito, and Ricardo el Veneno as dancers. She traveled to a number of European countries with her ensemble.

=== 1980–1999 ===
In 1980, Antonio Ruiz Soler hired her as a prima ballerina for the Ballet Nacional. She danced there until 1982 and then moved to the Ballet Nacional de España in Madrid. Her most important performances in those years were in El amor brujo by Manuel de Falla and in numerous flamencos. In 1984, she was hired by the television company Televisión Española as a dancer and choreographer for the series Proceso a Mariana Pineda. In 1986, she returned to the Ballet Nacional as an invited artist and stayed there until 1989. Outstanding performances in those years were her interpretation of Soleá (1986) and her performance in the new production of Medea by José Granero and Manolo Sanlúcar, in the Boléro by Maurice Ravel, in the sombrero de tres picos and in Los Tarantos and Don Juan by José Antonio. In the latter play, she embodied the role of Death. With the Ballet Nacional, she traveled to Moscow, Saint Petersburg, Israel, Australia, Germany and Italy, New York City, and Washington, D.C.

In 1989, the government of the Region of Murcia commissioned her to found a state ballet: the Ballet Región de Murcia. The first performance took place in September, a few months after it was founded. At the Teatro Romeo de Murcia, she herself embodied the title role in Medea. In the further program, the ensemble interpreted Triana by Isaac Albéniz and Sinfonía Española by Édouard Lalo to choreographies by José Granero. The audience celebrated the performance with jubilant applause. In 1991, she directed El cielo protector based on the novella by Paul Bowles. She danced one of the main roles alongside Joaquín Cortés and Antonio Márquez. She resigned from her position as director in 1992 due to conflicts with members of the regional administration. With her departure, the Ballet Región de Murcia also ceased to exist. In the same year, she appeared in Carlos Saura's film Sevillanas. In 1993, she danced as a guest star alongside Joaquin Grilo in Joaquín Cortés' show Cibayí.

1995 was a particularly eventful year for Merche Esmeralda. She toured Spain in the role of the goddess in Antonio Canales' show Venus y Narciso. She also collaborated with Antonio Canales in A cuerda de tacón. In the film Flamenco by Carlos Saura, she danced an outstanding interpretation of the guajira. She had another film appearance in Chus Gutiérrez' work Alma Gitana. She founded a dance school in Madrid and ended the year with a performance in the Teatro de la Zarzuela in front of the Spanish royal couple.

In 1996, Merche Esmeralda founded her own company again. With it, she performed Mujeres at the Teatro Principal in Vitoria. Alongside her, Sara Baras and Eva Yerbabuena performed as the evening's stars, in solos, duos, and together in threes. The three dancers each embody their own dance style, which clearly distinguishes them from the other two. The instrumental accompaniment was a daring break with tradition: in addition to the classical accompaniment with guitar and clapping, drums, violin, and double bass were also played.

In 1997, she was elected to the board of the Asociación de Escuelas de Danza.

Together with Mario Maya, Antonio Canales, and Manuela Carrasco, Merche Esmeralda performed in the Gala de Danza Flamenca in Seville. But her most important performance that year was without a doubt in the Gran Teatro de Córdoba in the play Todas las primaveras. Its director, Ángel Fernández Montesinos called it a symphony of language, music, and dance. In it, Merche Esmeralda embodied love. As such, she persuaded the man, portrayed by Carlos Ballesteros, to recite poems.

A year later, she sang the role of the moon in Francisco Suárez's version of Blood Wedding at the Getafe Autumn Festival. For this performance, she was nominated for the Premios Max of the Sociedad General de Autores y Editores. In 1999, she ventured into one of the most remarkable innovations in the recent history of flamenco: in the show Ciclos at the Valladolid Dance Festival, she danced to the singing of Freddie Mercury. Overall, she combined classic flamenco with contemporary elements in this show without betraying the reputation of the classic palo. Among other things, the critic Juan de la Plata praised her masterful interpretation of the siguiriyas, her stylish soleá and her tangos, danced in the best tradition. A year later, in 1999, she performed at the Seville Biennale in tribute to her former teacher, Matilde Coral. There, she danced a granaína and a levantica, two dances that had not yet found their way into the standard flamenco canon. The play, Tormento de arena, was directed against violence and terror and was dedicated to the victims.

=== 2000-2015 ===
In 2000, she danced at the gala Día internacional de la Danza in Madrid and again in Madrid in 2001 at the Gala de la Danza Española y el Flamenco. In 2002, she appeared in the role of the sorceress in Juan Carlos Santamaría's version of El amor brujo in Madrid. In 2002, she danced as a guest star in Juan Carlos Santamaría's company in their performance Embrujo. At the Festival Internacional del Castillo in Aínsa, she danced in the show Nacida en el sur.

In 2007, she was awarded the Compás del Cante prize and in 2008, she was honored with the Calle de Alcalá prize. She danced in Mujeres in 2008 with Belén Maya and the youthful Rocío Molino.

In 2010, Merche Esmeralda announced her retirement from the stage. She gave her farewell performance with a new performance of Medea, which she had danced with the Ballet Nacional in 1986. She continued her teaching activities. However, she could not resist the poetry of the play Última parada with verses by Miguel Hernández, and so she returned to the stage in 2014 at the Bienal de Flamenco (Seville) and later in Madrid. Also in 2015, she performed in Última parada in Madrid.

=== Teaching activities ===
Since 1997, Merche Esmeralda has taught numerous courses and master classes. She taught in Barcelona, Madrid, Santander, Seville, Jerez de la Frontera, at the University of Alcalá, but also abroad, especially in Germany and Japan. In 1999, she presented her self-developed flamenco teaching method. This was taken over by the Alfonso X El Sabio University in Madrid. In 2006, she was appointed professor at the Conservatorio Superior de Danza de Madrid.

== Awards and honours ==
- 2007, Compás del Cante prize
- 2008, Calle de Alcalá prize
