= Cantes libres =

Cantes libres is a Spanish expression that literally means "free songs". It is applied on any flamenco palos (musical forms) in which there is no recognisable metre (music) or rhythmic pattern. The melody thus flows freely, unconstructed by metre, so singers can shorten or lengthen musical phrases at will, as long as they respect the basic melodic line of the style they are singing.

The meaning of this expression should not be confused with concepts like rubato or ad libitum which usually refer to a relative freedom of the musician in following the time signature. In this type of singing there is no time signature at all, so freedom is absolute, and the only restrictions are those imposed by the traditional basic melody.

== Roles of guitar and dance ==
When these palos are played in the guitar, either as accompaniment or as solo, they are known as toques libres, meaning free guitar playing. The guitar accompaniment used for most of this palos (when they are accompanied) consists in short musical phrases leading to a chord that the singer has previously reached at the end of a line of verse. So the function of the guitar, more than really accompanying the melody throughout, consists in responding to the singer and underlying the harmonic progression of the song, plus adding a chord occasionally to support the singer. Guitar written scores for toques libres do not include any time signature for the totally free sections. However, falsetas (guitar solo interludes between stanzas) can include sections with a definite time signature.

Owing to their lack or regular rhythm, these palos are not normally danced. However, from the 1960s there was a tendency to create choreographies for them, as they provide an opportunity for the dancer to show other aspects of flamenco dance, like braceo (movement of the arms).

== Palos classified as cantes libres ==
The palos traditionally classified as cantes libres are all derived from earlier rhythmic fandangos.

- Fandangos naturales. They are structurally derived from the fandangos de Huelva and can also be referred to as fandangos libres, or simply fandangos (when the word fandango is not qualified, nowadays by default it refers to the free styles). Although the Fandango de Huelva is always played rhythmically, since the beginning of the 20th century some singers started to create personal free styles. At the beginning of the process, the rhythm of the Fandango the Huelva was simply slowed down and played more rubato, with the guitar even stopping occasionally to conclude a line of verse. This is still visible in the fandango style by El Gloria. Finally, any hints of regular rhythm were dropped and singers started creating personal forms or variations from traditional fandangos with no time signature at all. The fashion of personal fandangos produced dozens (or maybe hundreds) of this personal forms, especially in the years 1920-1950. For this reason, the expression fandangos personales (personal fandangos) has come to be identified with any free fandango. Nevertheless, a few personal fandangos do follow regular metre.
- Eastern Andalusian free styles, all derived from older fandangos abandolaos. These were also rhythmic styles, originally played with a lively tempo. They derive their name from their characteristic guitar strums (quite different from the typical in fandangos de Huelva), which resemble the typical strums of the bandola and bandurria (instruments of the mandolin type), used in the folkloric precedents of these styles. These palos followed the same process as the fandangos derived from Huelva: they were first slowed down, and finally the regular metre disappeared. Singers like Enrique el Mellizo and Antonio Chacón and guitarists like Ramón Montoya played a decisive role in freeing these styles from their melodic constraints. The palos that suffered this process were the malagueñas, granaína and media granaína, and the group of the cantes de las minas, including: tarantas, cartageneras, minera, murciana and levantica.

== Other palos with more or less free rhythm ==
Apart from the styles usually called cantes libres, there are other palos to which this term could be applied, even if traditionally it is not. Such is the case of the group of palos known as Cantes a palo seco (that is, Songs a cappella), also known as the toná group. It comprises tonás, martinetes and carceleras, saetas, debla and trilla. Although percussion can be added to them, its function is not to constrain the melody to a rhythm: it is rather added to create ambience. When these styles are sung as a basis for the dance, they are known as martinetes, even when they include other styles of this group.

There is, therefore, a reversible tendency in flamenco: many styles that originally started as rhythmical and dance-oriented were later slowed-down and eventually lost their link to dance and their metre subjection, while other styles, originated as free songs, were later adapted to a rhythm to make them apt for dancing.

== Discography ==
BLAS VEGA, José (compiler) Magna antología del cante flamenco, CD edition, 1982, Vols. I, VII, VIII, IX,

== Sources ==
- GRANADOS, Manuel: Teoría musical de la guitarra flamenca, Ventilador, 1998
- MARTÍN SALAZAR, Jorge: Los cantes flamencos Diputación Provincial de Granada
- ROSSY, Hipólito: Teoría del cante jondo, Second edition, CREDSA, S.A., 1998 (first edition 1966) ISBN 978-84-7056-354-6
