= Palo (flamenco) =

Musical forms in flamenco

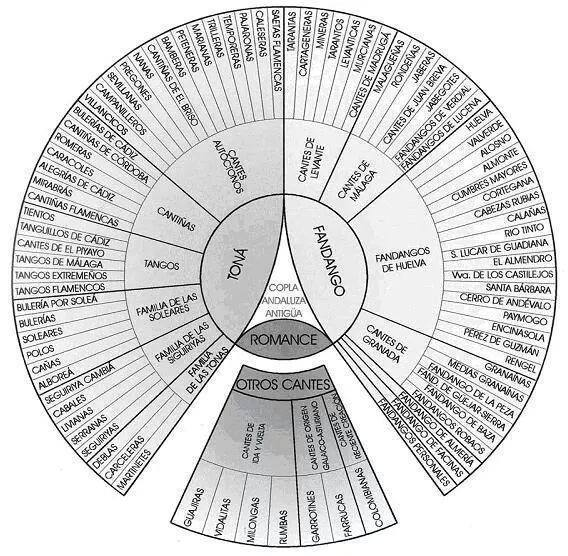
The Palos of Flamenco

A palo (Spanish pronunciation: [ˈpalo]) or cante is any of the different traditional musical forms in flamenco.

The word palo, in Spanish, has several meanings, the main one being "stick", "pole", "rod", "tree" or "branch", but in this case it has the sense of "suit of cards" i.e. category or classification.

== Identifying palos ==
Each palo is identified by a variety of musical features such as its rhythmic pattern, its mode, its characteristic motifs, the type of stanza used for the lyrics, and its origin.

The concept of palo is not straightforward or rigorous. It is a popular, sometimes inconsistent way of classifying songs according to similar characteristics. For example, to determine that a song belongs to the palo called Bulerías, only the rhythm is taken into consideration, no matter its mode or stanza. Fandangos, on the other hand, include a variety of forms in 3/4 or 6/8, but later it developed "free" forms (that is, with no determined rhythm). Most palos include dozens of traditional songs, while others like the serrana include only one song. Another interesting example is that of the polo and the caña: they are almost identical and would be expected to be classified as variations of the same song, but tradition has classified them as different palos.

== Classification of palos ==
Palos have been categorized in different ways. According to their traditionally attributed origin, they are often classified in the shape of a tree, usually in a rather unscientific way.

Another way to categorize the palos is with respect to their musical origin. Palos in the fandango family (including malagueñas, granaínas, tarantas, and the fandango de Huelva) can be seen as stylized forms of genres of Andalusian folk music. Soleares and siguiriyas are more strictly associated with Romani music culture. Because of their solemn character, they are sometimes referred to as cante jondo or “deep song,” as opposed to cantes such as tangos and bulerías, which are fast and festive.

Some palos such as granaínas, malagueñas, and fandango libre, are rendered in free rhythm, whereas most others are metered, that is, in compás. Some of the latter in duple meter (e.g. tangos and tientos) while the majority of others are in a form of triple meter (e.g. soleares, bulerías, etc.).

In 1990, Christof Jung suggested another way to categorize the palos is based on their mood and feel. In this regard, the palos are categorized as such:

1. Cante Grande group: includes bulería por soleá, cabales, caña, carcelera, corríos, debla, liviana, martinete, playera, polo, pregones, saeta (flamenco), serranas, siguiriyas, soléa (soleares) and toña. All of them include singing and dancing, except for toña which is usually not accompanied with dance.
2. Cante Intermedio group: includes granaínas, jabera, malagueñas, medio polo', mineras, petenera, policaña, tarantas/taranto, and tientos. All of them are accompanied with singing.
3. Cante Chico group: includes alboreá, alegrías, bambera, bandolá, boleras, bulerías, calesera, campanilleros, cantifia, caracoles, cartagenera, chuflas, columbianas, fandangos, fandanguillos, farruca, garrotín, guajíra, jaleo, lorqueña, mariana, media granaína, milonga, mirabrtis, murciana, nanas, panadero, rotis, rocieras, romeras, rondeña, rosás, rumba gitana, sevillanas, tangos gitanos, tanguillo, tiranas, trillera, verdiales, villancicos, vito, zambra, and zorongo gitano. Among these, boleras is not accompanied with singing, and milonga and zorongo are not accompanied with dance.

Finally, some classify the palos based on a combination of their origin and compas:

1. Soleá family, which all use 12-beat compás cycles: alboreá, bulerías, caña and polo, cantinas group (alegrías, caracoles, mirabras, romeras), peteneras, romance (palo) and solea.
2. Toná family, also known as palo seco: includes debla, martinetes, carceleras, saetas, trilla, and tonás.
3. Fandango family: includes fandangos de huelva, fandangos orientales, fandangos abandolaos, fandangos libres, verdiales, rondeñas, jaberas, granaínas, media granaína, and malagueñas
4. Tango family, which al use a 4/4 compás cycle: farruca, garrotín, marianas, tarantas/taranto, tientos, tanguillos, and tangos.
5. Seguiriyas family: includes cabales, livianas, serrana and seguiriyas.
6. Ida y vuelta family, also have a tango rhythm and feel, but originate from South America: colombianas, guajiras, rumba and vidalitas.
7. Other palos not belonging to any of the above groups: campanilleros, bambera, serillanas, nanas, zambra and zorongo.

Below, we describe several categories of the latter classification with more detail.

=== Cantes a palo seco (a cappella) ===
Cantes a palo seco (a cappella) are regarded by some theorists like Demófilo or Molina and Mairena as the origin of all flamenco songs and the carceleras, also classified as palos are in fact varieties of the Martinetes. They are traditionally considered to be of Romani origin. The trilla is another form of cante a palo seco, originated in the songs traditionally sung by peasants at work (trilla means threshing). Another important palo of this type is the saetas, reserved to Holy Week processions. Some modern flamenco artists have also performed these styles with instrumental accompaniment, a practice that is spurned by purists. However, it has been frequently stated that some other palos that are now played with accompaniment were also played a cappella in the past. When martinetes are sung as musical support for dance, they are normally accompanied by a siguiriya type percussion, often using a hammer and anvil to evoke their hypothetical origin as cantes de fragua (songs from the smiths).

=== Cantes related to soleá ===
This group comprises all songs played with the soleá rhythm, that is, following this rhythmic pattern:

The group normally includes the following palos: soleá, bulerías por soleá (also called Soleá por bulería), the cantiñas group (including alegrías, romeras, caracoles, mirabrás and other cantiñas), bulerías, caña and polo. Most of them have traditionally been considered of Romani origin.

The bulerías is a special case in this group, as it is not constrained to the typical 12-beat scheme of soleá, but can also incorporate 6-beat and 3-beat sections. The palos caña and polo include only one song each, which is in fact very similar. They are classified in this group owing to their accompaniment, but the melody of the songs is not really related to the soleá songs.

The consideration of bulerías por soleá is problematic. It can be considered as just a way of playing soleá with a regular rhythm (instead of the usual rubato often heard in soleá). For this reason, it is often called "soleá al golpe" (literally, "soleá to the beat"). At other times, it is used to classify a subset of traditional songs in soleá rhythm.

The so-called fandango por soleá is just a regular fandango in which the traditional fandango guitar accompaniment has been replaced by the one typical of soleá (with the necessary adjustments to the rhythm of the song). It is normally classified under the fandangos group.

=== Cantes related to seguiriya ===
The palos under this classification are: seguiriya, cabales, serrana, livianas, and toná liviana. Although martinetes and other tonás are sometimes played with a seguiriya percussion, they are not included in this group. The only palo in this group to have a wide variety of estilos is the seguiriya. The livianas palo comprises only two songs, and the serrana and tona liviana only one song. All these palos follow a 12-beat pattern, with a different distribution of strong beats. However, we could also argue that it is the same rhythm as soléa, starting in a different beat:

In fact, if you start counting the soléa on the eighth beat, you will obtain a seguiriya rhythm.

=== Cantes derived from fandangos ===
The fandangos were immensely popular folkloric dances in large areas of Spain and Ibero-America during the 18th century. They were adopted by several classical musicians like Antonio Soler or Boccherini as a basis for their own compositions. Although they are nowadays often sung as cantes libres, they were originally sung and played to support the dance of the same name. When played with a regular rhythm, they follow a 3/4 or 6/8 time signature. At the end of the 19th century they became a flamenco palo in their own right. The fandangos group is normally subclassified as follows:

- Fandangos from Huelva. The more traditional styles are rhythmic, but since the beginning of the 20th century they have also been interpreted as cantes libres. Most personal creations by singers, called Fandangos personales, are based on these varieties of fandango. The variety of traditional local fandangos in the province of Huelva is enormous, but Huelva city and the town of Alosno have been especially prolific.
- Fandangos orientales (eastern fandangos). Originated in the eastern part of Andalusia and Murcia. This subgroup is further classified as:
  - Fandangos abandolaos. They are played in regular 3/4 time signature. They include verdiales, jaberas, rondeñas, fandangos de lucena, old malagueñas and other palos.
  - Cantes libres (with no regular rhythmic pattern). This category includes modern malagueñas, tarantas, cartageneras, cantes de madrugá, minera, murciana, levantica, granaína and media granaína.
- Fandangos personales. Any fandango which is not traditional by a creation of a more recent singer. Fandangos personales were the predominant flamenco song between the 1930s and 1950s, and were later deprecated by purists.

=== Cantes related to tangos ===
The tangos group comprises most of the flamenco forms in a 4/4 beat. It comprises tangos, tientos, farruca, garrotín and rumba and tanguillos, plus other rare palos such as marianas. The tientos are a slower, more syncopated form of the tangos which recall the rhythm of the habaneras. Many traditional melodies can be sung both in tango and tiento rhythm and, quite often, singers start with a suite of tientos and complete it with one or more stanzas in tango rhythm. The farruca and the garrotín were folkloric songs originated probably in Asturias and Catalonia and brought to Andalusia, where they acquired flamenco characteristics.

=== Cantes de ida y vuelta (related to Ibero-America) ===
The Spanish expression ida y vuelta ("departure and return") refers to a "round trip". These palos are supposed to have been exported from Spain to the New World, where they acquired Native American and African influences, to be reimported again in Andalusia by returned emigrants. These palos include Cuban guajiras, vidalitas, Uruguayan milongas, and Colombianas.

=== Other palos ===
Flamenco singers often sing several types of folkloric songs, lending them flamenco musical features. Most of these songs are often not considered, properly speaking, as flamenco, although they have long been incorporated to the repertoire of flamenco artists. They include palos such as sevillanas, nanas ("lullabies"), bamba, zambras, zorongo or campanilleros and of course the Spanish Rumba.
