= Custodia Romero =

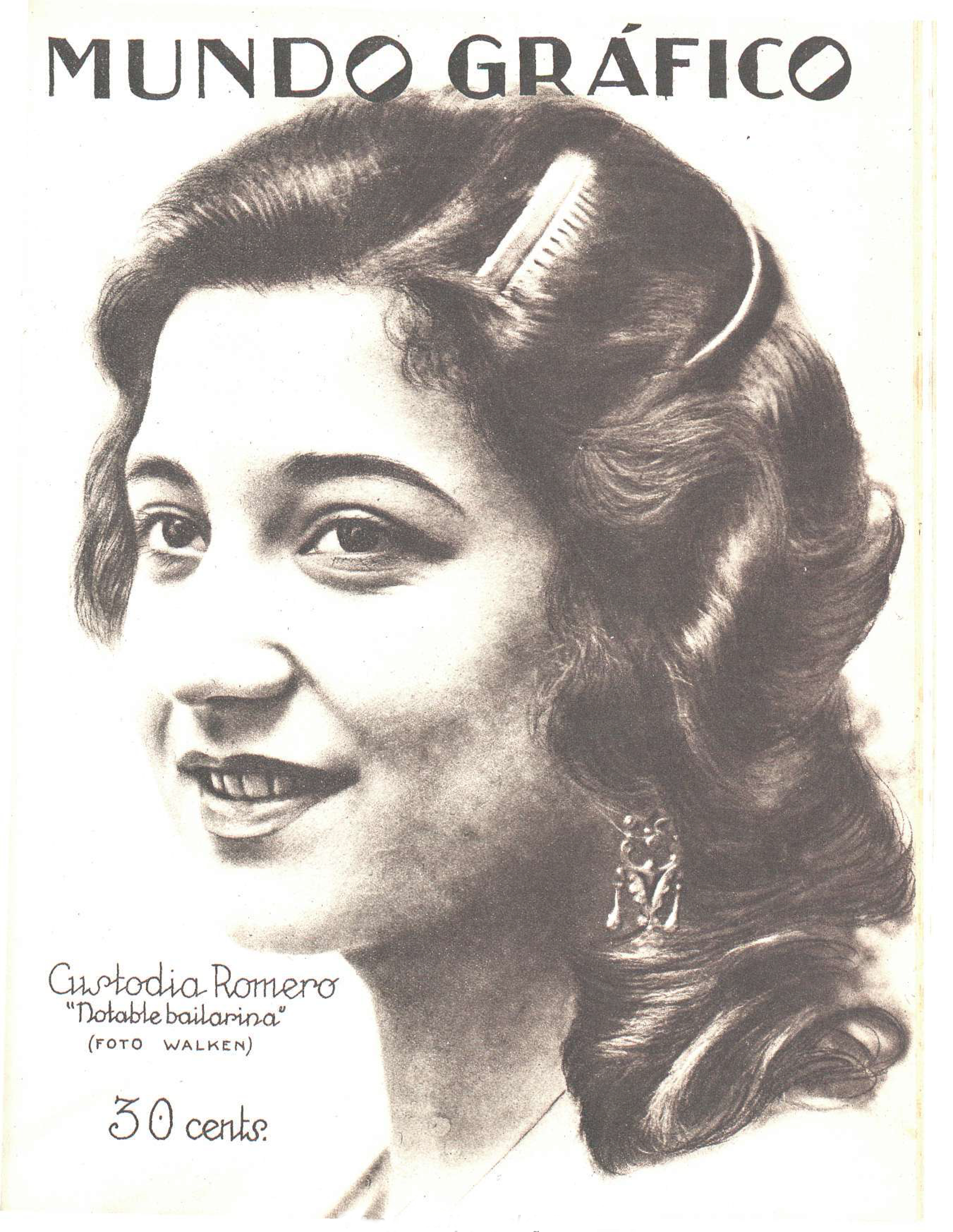
Custodia Romero (1924)

Custodia Cortés Romero (artistically known as La Venus de bronce; La Carolina, 1905 - La Carolina, 6/7 March 1974) was a Spanish flamenco dancer and actress.

== Biography ==
She was born in 1905 in the town of La Carolina, Jaén. Romero was a member of a Roma family. From a very young age, she stood out for her dance. Integrating into a flamenco group, she performed in Paris at the age of thirteen, achieving great success. Her triumph in France led her to tour the world; She recorded an album in New York City. Her farrucas, zambras, and her alegrías, interpreted with a gypsy style, were applauded worldwide. She died in her hometown on 6 or 7 March 1974.

== Filmography ==
- La medalla del torero (1925) directed by José Buchs
- Isabel de Solís, reina de Granada (1931) directed by José Buchs

== Bibliography ==
- Enciclopedia Espasa, Supplement, 1973-74, p. 263 (ISBN 84-239-6951-7)
