= Polo (flamenco palo) =

Polo (Spanish pronunciation: [ˈpolo]) is the name of a flamenco palo or musical form. There is only one known song in this palo, which is extremely similar to another palo called caña, and its guitar accompaniment, like the caña, shares its rhythm and motifs with soleá. Both the caña and polo share the same musical mode. The polo has usually been considered as a derivation of the caña. To complete the singing of the polo, singers usually sing a stanza in the palo of soleá, generally in the style called soleá apolá.

Although nowadays, only one song is known for the polo, known as polo natural, past writers also mention another polo, called polo de Tobalo, which has probably been lost.

== Poetic and musical structure ==
The stanza of the polo is the cuarteta romanceada, typical of most flamenco songs and Spanish folklore: four octosyllabic verses, the second and fourth rhyming in assonance. It is usually sung with the following typical lines:

Carmona tiene una fuente
con catorce o quince caños
con un letrero que dice:
¡Viva el polo sevillano!

Translation:
Carmona has a fountain
With fourteen or fifteen jets
And an inscription that reads
Long live the Sevillan polo!

Often, the last line is replaced by another saying: "Viva el polo de Tobalo" ("Long live the polo de Tobalo"). This is curious, as the melody used is not that of the polo de Tobalo, but that of the polo natural. Some lines are partially repeated, and there are also two series of melismas sung on one vowel in the middle and at the end of the stanza, which separate the song in two sections. The stanza is therefore rendered like this:

Carmona tiene una fuente
con catorce
con catorce o quince caños
oooh oooh oooh etc. (melismas)

con un letrero que dice y que
y viva el polo
viva el polo de Tobalo
oooh ooh ooh etc.

As to the metre and musical mode, they are the same as for the soleá, that is 12-beat metre (or alternating 3/4 and 6/8) and Phrygian mode (for more information, see article on soleá). The guitar accompaniment and falsetas are also inspired by the soleá, although some special arpeggios are included after the second line of each section ("con catorce" and "y viva el polo") and during the singing of the melismas. It is always accompanied in the guitar chord position of E for the tonic. Musicologist Hipólito Rossy stated that the song was in [major mode] and 3-beat metre (Rossy [1966] 1998), but he was not very familiar with this palo, as all recordings show the typical soleá rhythm and Phrygian mode. He might have been influenced by the recording of singer Jacinto Almadén, in which guitarist Perico el del Lunar certainly uses some chords insinuating the major mode.

== Historical notes ==
The first mentions of a "Gypsy polo" can be found in the poem La Quincaida by the Count of Noroña, written in 1779. It is also mentioned in the Cartas Marruecas, by José Cadalso (written around the same years). Some critics argue that this was not yet the current polo, but a primitive folkloric song, which was not yet flamenco:

(...) the Gypsies, in the eve of flamenco, were acting on the Spanish popular rhythms and songs which, still preserving this popular quality, evolved sensibly towards an agitanamiento ("gypsying") which will finally be evident. When this transition time was completed, that song, that rhythm that the Gypsies knew in Andalusia were already a different thing, they were flamenco. In the case of the polo, this did not happen until the beginning of the 19th century, if we are to accept the criteria from Molina and Mairena, and Butler.

Both the caña and the polo seem to have enjoyed great success and were considered the finest type of flamenco song at the beginning of the 19th century. Serafín Estébanez Calderón, in his book from 1847 Escenas andaluzas (Andalusian Scenes), mentioned famous singer El Planeta (the protagonist in one of the scenes), as "King of both polos". He also assured that the polo was difficult to sing and that it was derived from the caña and mentions the polo de Tobalo. The polo is widely mentioned in the literature of the 19th century. Most important singers at the time included it in their repertoire, up to the times of Antonio Chacón, who is reported to be one of the latest great performers of this song.

Although historic sources mention two or more polos, only one variety is known for sure to have survived to our days: the polo natural. Singer Pepe de la Matrona recorded a version of the polo Tobalo at the end of the 1969s, but the authenticity of this recorded version has been put in doubt by several critics on the grounds that he could never explain who he had heard it from (Álvarez Caballero 1998).

The only old recording with the title of polo, prior to its rediscovery in the 1950s, was made by La Rubia and it resembles the caña even more than the usual version of the polo natural. In 1960, at the time of reappraisal of traditional cante, the polo natural was recorded by Jacinto Almadén (also known as "El Niño de Almadén"), in the Antología del cante flamenco compiled by guitarist Perico el del Lunar and flamencologist Tomás Andrade de Silva. At the time, according to the introduction the latter wrote for this anthology, singers who knew this song were extremely rare. Since then, it has been recorded by several famous singers, but it has remained in

== Theories about the polo ==
There are several contradictory theories, that have been suggested regarding the origins of the polo and its varieties.

- Folklorist Demófilo in his Colección de cantes flamencos compiled 37 different lyrics that were sung indistinctly as either polos or cañas. He also added: "the famous singer Tobalo (Cristóbal) excelled in the polos and gave his name to a special air of his, nowadays known as the polo Tobalo. (Quoted by Martín Salazar n.d.) Estébanez Calderón, in his Escenas Andaluzas, also stated that the polo derived from the caña, and mentioned that they
- Andrade de Silva mentions the soleá as the origin of the polo. According to him, singer Curro Durse initiated the custom of singing the polo as appendix to the caña, a custom followed by singers until the polo fell into disuse after Antonio Chacón. The style chosen for this was the polo natural, that is, the original form of the polo, without much variations added by the singers. This flamencologist also states that Tobalo innovated the polo and made it totally different from the caña. At the time this recording was made, it was already customary to sing the polo without the caña, adding instead the soleá apolá at the end (Andrade de Silva [1960] 1988).
- According to José Navarro Rodríguez, the polo never existed. What we know as polo is just a variation, created by 19th century singer Curro Durse, of the caña. Navarro Rodríguez goes on to say that the caña was the creation of a singer from Ronda, called Cristóbal Palmero and known as "Tobalo El Polo", who lived between the end of the 18th century and the beginning of the 19th. As "Tobalo" is a familiar name commonly used in Andalusia for those who are called "Cristóbal", and he inherited his father nickname ("Polo") this caused a false belief that the song he created (the caña) was called Polo de Tobalo (Polo by Tobalo). This theory has been questioned as its author did not sustain it with any verifiable evidence (Álvarez Caballero [1994] 1998).
- In their book Mundo y formas del cante flamenco, published in 1965, poet Ricardo Molina and singer Mairena, quoting musicologist García Matos, affirm that the flamenco polo bears no relationship at all with the folkloric polo of the 18th century and it is not even derived from it: it just borrowed its name. They agree with the usual theory that it derives from the caña. They contradicted previous flamenco historians who defined the polo as a gypsy song, and disregard it as a "really poor and inferior song", "rigid and stererotyped", "a fossile", "a mummy". They assure that:

The supposed quality of the polo and its pretended quality are but an invention of writers who did not know a word about flamenco singing. Many confused the Spanish or Spanish-American polo with the flamenco one, attributing to the latter the popularity of the other (Molina and Mairena [1965] 1979).

It must to be noted that Antonio Mairena tended to deprecate all non-Gypsy palos as inferior in quality. However, even though in this book he despised the polo as non-Gypsy, he had recorded it some years before. When republishing this recording in his Antología del cante flamenco y cante gitano in 1965, he included it among the Gypsy palos.

== Recordings ==
The following recordings are usually recommended for reference:

- Antología del cante flamenco, Hispavox, Second edition, 1988, compiled by Tomás Andrade de Silva and Perico el del Lunar. Contains a polo by "El niño de Almadén" (Jacinto Almadén), and a caña by Rafael Romero.
- Antologia del cante flamenco y cante gitano, compiled by Antonio Mairena. Contains a polo and a caña, sung by Mairena himself
- Magna antología del cante flamenco, Vol. VIII, CD Edition, Hispavox, 1992. It has a caña sung by Enrique Morente, a "Polo de Tobalo" by Pepe de la Matrona. The polo by Jacinto Almadén in the Antología del cante flamenco mentioned above is also there.
- Manolo Caracol recorded a very personal version of the caña in 1958. It has been republished in the collection "Quejío", in a compilation called El genio de Manolo Caracol, Hispavox, 1997.
- Enrique Morente has recorded an innovative version, which he calls Policaña in his album El pequeño reloj, EMI-ODEON, 2003. It has characteristics of both polo and caña. It is not, of course, the original policaña but a personal recreation. In another of his surprising experiments, the CD also contains a caña sung with the accompaniment an old recording of guitarist Manolo de Huelva

== See also ==
- Flamenco
- Palo (flamenco)
- Soleá

== Sources ==
ÁLVAREZ CABALLERO, Ángel: El cante flamenco, Alianza Editorial, Madrid, 1998

ANDRADE DE SILVA, "Sobre los orígenes de trenta y tres cantes", published as an introduction to recording Antología del Cante Flamenco, Hispavox, S.A, Madrid, 1960

CADALSO, José: Cartas marruecas (available in Biblioteca Virtual Cervantes, www.cervantesvirtual.com)

ESTÉBANEZ CALDERÓN, Serafín: "Asamblea general de los caballeros y damas de Triana, y toma de hábito en la orden de cierta rubia bailadora" in Escenas andaluzas, Madrid, 1847 (available in Biblioteca Virtual Cervantes, www.cervantesvirtual.com)

MARTÍN SALAZAR, Jorge: Los cantes flamencos, Diputación General de Granada, n.d.

MAIRENA, Antonio and MOLINA, Ricardo: Mundo y formas del cante flamenco, [Revista de Occidente, Madrid, 1963], Librería Al-Andalus, Granada-Sevilla, 1979

ROSSY, Hipólito: Teoría del cante jondo, Second edition, CREDSA S.A., Barcelona, 1998 ISBN 84-7056-354-8
