= Falseta =

Part of Flamenco music

A Falseta is part of Flamenco music. They are usually short melodies played by the guitarist(s) in between sung verses, or to accompany dancers. In a guitar solo, the artists play already created falsetas or improvise new falsetas which are then put together to form the whole piece. A falseta can be roughly comparable to a lick in jazz or blues music.

== Examples ==
The Soleares, Alegrias and other palos could be explained as one measure of 6/8 time and one measure of 3/4 time, although changes of harmony tend to accent the third and tenth beat, avoiding the Western Classical idea of downbeat, and therefore further obscure the unfamiliar listener's ability to sense the beginning and middle of the cycle. As this musical tendency would be common for them, their sense of rhythmic emphasis would naturally be obscured.

[12] 1 2 [3] 4 5 [6] 7 [8] 9 [10] 11

The Siguiriyas is the same pattern as the Soleares, but shifted:

[12] 1 [2] 3 [4] 5 6 [7] 8 9 [10] 11

Although many performers will count it as follows:

1 and 2 and 3 and a 4 and a 5 and

The farrucas are 2 measures of 4/4 time, the falsetas each having 8 beats:

[1] 2 [3] 4 [5] 6 [7] 8

Most other forms follow these two basic rhythms, though there can be considerable variation, such as in the Granaína.
