= Cantes a palo seco =

The Spanish term Cantes a palo seco refers to a category of flamenco palos (musical forms) traditionally sung a cappella or, in some cases, with some sort of percussion. The category comprises the following palos:

- Tonás
- Martinetes
- Debla
- Carceleras
- Saetas
- Trilla or Trilleras.

In fact, almost any palo can be sung unaccompanied, especially in private juergas (parties), where there is often no guitarist available. Even in professional settings, some palos which are normally accompanied by the guitar, like seguiriya, bulerías, or even soleá, are sometimes heard 'a palo seco'.
