= Saeta (flamenco) =

Revered form of Andalusian religious song

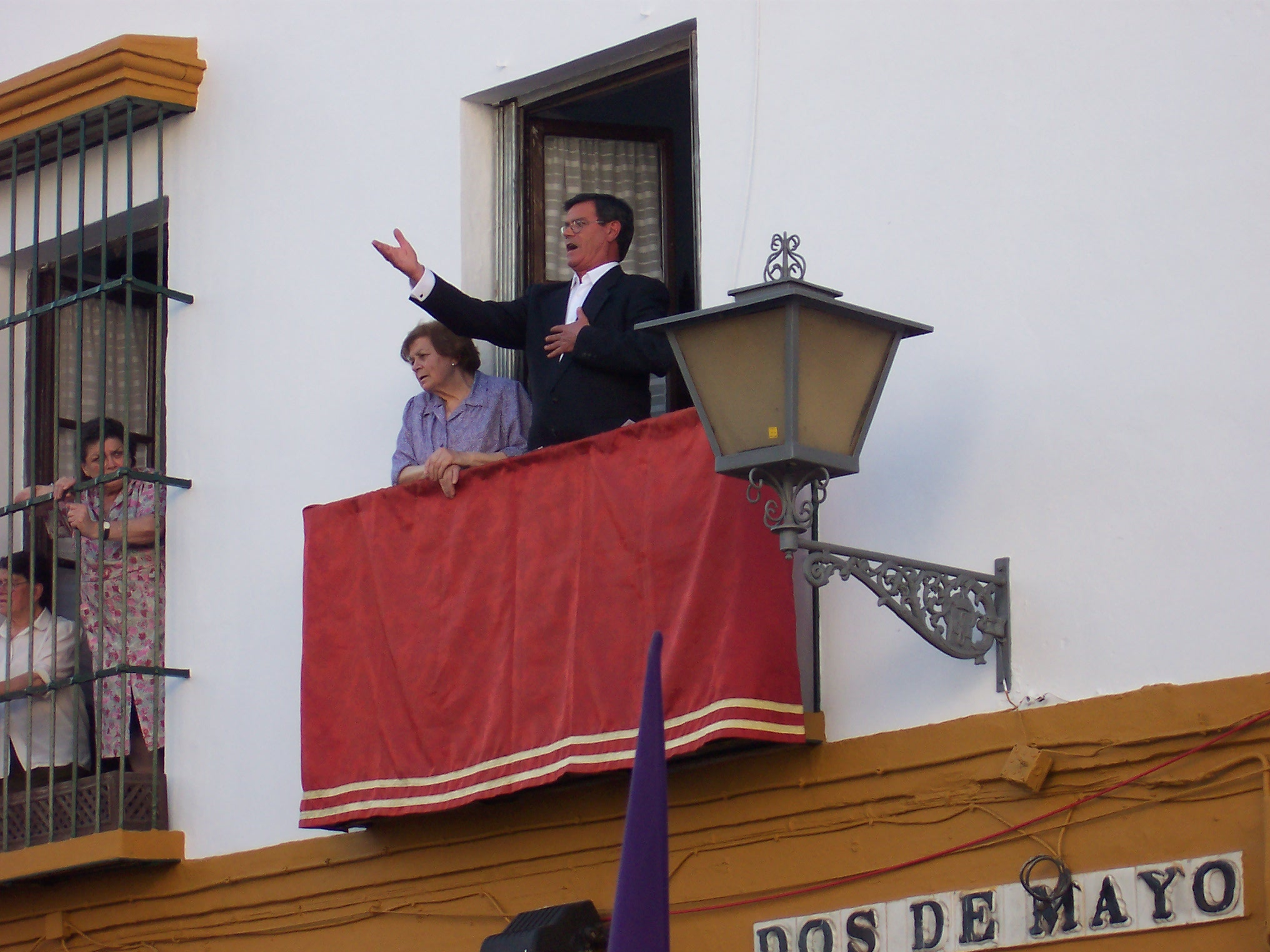
A saetero (saeta singer) in Sevilla, 2006.

The saeta (Spanish pronunciation: [saˈeta]) is a revered form of Andalusian religious song, whose form and style have evolved over many centuries. Saetas evoke strong emotion and are sung most often during public processions. The saeta, an unaccompanied song, is also believed to stem from Jewish religious songs which are believed to date back to the 16th century.

== Performance ==
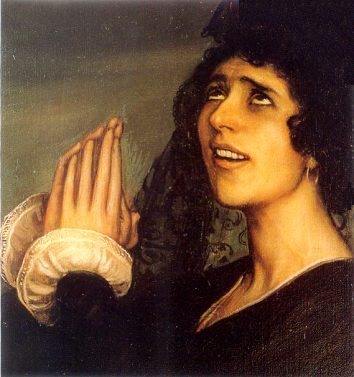
The saeta by Julio Romero de Torres (1918).

The saeta is a song of Catholic Andalusia dating back many centuries. The saeta antigua [old saeta] probably arose from the recitation of psalms under the influence of liturgical music. "Saetas vary greatly in form and style, ranging from simple syllabic melodies to highly ornamented ones." In the older tradition, solemn drums and horns might accompany the singer, or the saetero sang alone. Since the nineteenth century, however, the more favored saetas have incorporated distinct elements associated with Flamenco music, particularly the siguiriyas.

The saeta is best known for its mournful power during Holy Week in Spain. The song is performed during the processions by religious confraternities that move slowly through the streets of cities and towns in southern Spain. Possessing a plaintive emotional intensity, and dramatic charge, the saeta is sung by the saetero, often from a balcony, and may be addressed to the statue of Jesus below, in his agony on the Via Dolorosa, or to that of his suffering mother Mary. These and other crafted statues are mounted on platforms and carried along the streets on the shoulders of several penitents who pass among the assembled public. The immediate emotional response to the saeta, often of intense sorrow, may be the reason for its name, as the Spanish word saeta can mean "arrow or dart". One of the places with the most tradition and variety in the singing of the flamenco saeta in Spain is Jerez de la Frontera.

Saetas are also sung at outdoor devotions throughout Lent, and may be sung during the Christmas season as well. A special form of the saeta (the saeta carcelera) is also sung at prisons during visits there by the confraternities. Several of the cities in Andalusia have their own peculiar styles of the saeta. Four intentions or themes have been distinguished from the religious lyrics, which mark the music of Saeta: descriptive, praising, prayerful, and exhortative.

== The music ==
The saeta is frequently sung a cappella. Taken from flamenco music are the melismas, tercios, and other flourishes. Although the saeta is one of the cantes a palo seco, the singer may also be accompanied, e.g., by beating drums, and horns. Arabic and Hebraic origins have been proposed.

Palos of flamenco adopted by the saeta include especially the siguiriyas and the martinetes. Other forms include the saeta por soleares, the por polos, the por cañas, and the por fandangos. Flamenco guitar accompaniment may be in 2/4 or 6/8 time, or may interchange regularly between 3/4 and 6/8. Commonly the saetero sings in a minor key finishing on the dominant; the meter of different verses will often be variable depending on the interpretation. The cantaor Manuel Torre (1878–1933) was well regarded for his Saeta.

== Its passion ==
Of a diverse heritage, the Saeta has become the emotional artistic fruit of several cultures. The Gypsies "se sienten identificados con los episodios de la Pasión y consideran a Jesús como un hermano en desgracia que sufre persecusión y muerte."

"La saeta, pues, costituye la síntesis antropológica del andaluz (hondura, plástica, señorío, dolor metafísico) coronada en santidad. La saeta exige un máximo de veracidad pasional, por lo mismo que a nadie le es dado encaramarse en la audacia de sus ayes sin la potencia y la certeza que brinda la posesión heroica del dolor."

It is said that Andalusians must talk to God during Holy Week, singing the Saeta during a cofradía procession being a mode of choice.

== Bibliography ==
- Ángel Álvarez Caballero, El cante flamenco (Madrid: Alianza Editorial 1994, 1998).
- Andrés Batista, Maestros y Estilos. Manual Flamenco (Madrid 1985).
- José Carlos de Luna, De cante grande y cante chico (Madrid: Editorial Escelicer [1926] 3d ed. 1942).
- Anselmo González Climent, Flamencologia (Madrid: Editorial Escelicer [1955] 1964).
- Félix Grande, Memoria del Flamenco (Madrid: Espasa-Calpe 1979), 2 volumes.
- Domingo Manfredi Cano, Geografia del cante jondo (Madrid: Editorial Bullón 1963).
- Timothy Mitchell, Passional Culture. Emotion, Religion, and Society in Southern Spain (Philadelphia: University of Pennsylvania 1990).
- Stanley Payne, Spanish Catholicism. An historical overview (University of Wisconsin 1984).
- Julian Pemartin, El cante flamenco. Guia alfabetica (Madrid: Afrodisio Aguado 1966).
- Manuel Ríos Ruiz, Introducción al Cante Flamenco (Madrid: Ediciones Istmo 1972).

== Recordings ==
=== CD & video ===
- Maestros de la Saeta. Semana Santa en Sevilla (CD by Planet Records 1993). Apparently from the 1930s to the 1960s, included are various saeteros with different or no accompaniment, among them the well known Niña de los Peines (1890-1969) and Manuel Vallejo (1891-1960).
- YouTube presents videos of recent Saeta performances, some made during the Holy Week processions.

=== Other idioms ===
- Joaquín Turina, "Jueves Santo a medianoche (Desfile de una cofradía por una callejuela)" in his Sevilla. Suite pintoresca, Opus 2, no. 2 (Sevilla 1908) [Classical].
- Miles Davis, "Saeta" in his album Sketches of Spain (Columbia Records: recorded 1959–1960, released 1960), at band 4 (5:06), written by Gil Evans [Jazz].
- Nico, "Saeta" on her album Drama of Exile (Aura Records, 1981)

== See also ==
- Holy Week in Spain
- Siguiriyas
