= Cartageneras =

Music form and style of flamenco

Cartageneras (Spanish pronunciation: [kaɾtaxeˈneɾas]) are a flamenco palo belonging to the category of the cantes de las minas (in English, songs of the mines) or cantes minero-levantinos (eastern miner songs). As the rest of the songs in this category, it derives from older folkloric fandango styles. The origin of this particular style is attributed to traditional fandango from the miner area of Cartagena in the province of Murcia, in southern Spain.

Although earlier singers like Rojo el Alpargatero contributed to its development, it was Antonio Chacón who determined its definite flamenco form and made it popular in other areas.

The stanza of the Cartagenera is the usual for Fandango. Originally, it was played in the same key and mode as the rest of fandangos. But since Ramón Montoya (Chacón's usual guitarist), all the Cantes de las minas started to be sung in the key of D major, modulating to F# phrygian at the end of the stanza. The chord used for the F# is in fact a rare chord, formed with the notes (from the 6th to the 1st string) F#, D#, F#, G, B, E. It was also at this time that the cantes de las minas started to lose their abandolao rhythmic pattern to become cantes libres (with no defined rhythmic pattern).

This palo contains a short list of cantes. Only two or three (depending on the authors) are classified under this name.

== Sources ==
- Álvarez Caballero, Ángel: La discoteca ideal del flamenco, Planeta, 1995.
- Martín Salazar, Jorge: Los cantes flamencos, Diputación Provincial de Granada.
