= Bandolá =

The bandolá is a type of flamenco singing, considered within the style of the cantes derived from the verdiales.

== Origin ==
Originally from Vélez-Málaga, bandolás appear when the verdiales lose their danceable character and also the accompaniment of the musicians. The interpretation is performed by a solo singer with a slower rhythm and accompanied only by a guitar. Its rhythm corresponds to the Spanish bolero.

Some authors consider that the bandolá is the common trunk of the cantes de Málaga, and that from it derive the rondeñas, the jabegote, the jabera and the malagueña itself, as well as the fandangos abandolaos and cantes personales, such as those of Juan Breva, and the granaínas of Frasquito Yerbagüena.
