= Adelita Domingo =

Spanish pianist, singer and dancer (1930–2012)

- (undated)
- Born: Adela Domingo Carmona; 21 April 1930; Seville, Spain
- Died: 31 July 2012 (aged 82); Seville
- Resting place: Cemetery of San Fernando
- Occupations: dancer; songwriter; concert pianist; teacher
- Awards: Medal of Andalusia

Adela Domingo Carmona (popularly known as Adelita Domingo; Seville, 21 April 1930 – Seville, 31 July 2012), was a Spanish dancer, songwriter, concert pianist, as well as a teacher of dance and tonadilla songs. Students of Copla folk music included Gracia Montes, Isabel Pantoja, Lolita Sevilla, Marifé de Triana, Paquita Rico, and Rocío Jurado. There were singers such as Ana María Bueno, Matilde Coral, Merche Esmeralda, and Milagros Mengíbar. Artists of flamenco, copla, and national pop included Paloma San Basilio and Pastora Soler.

== Biography ==
Adela Domingo Carmona was born in Seville, in city's old Teatro de San Fernando, where her father worked as a janitor. The owner of the theater, Adela Grande Barrau, became the child's godmother and the given name was passed on to the child. Adelita grew up in the theatre and became a performance artist, although she never got to act or dance in public, remaining in the background while teaching young talents.

In addition to studying with Juana la Macarrona, she attended the Ángel Pericet Academy since the age of eight, and studied piano at the Conservatorio de Sevilla when she was only seventeen years old.

Her house and her academy were situation in the Alameda de Hércules, and prominent copla artists passed through it, including Rocío Jurado, Isabel Pantoja, Encarnita Polo and Lolita Arispón, as well as the dancers Cristina Hoyos, Merche Esmeralda, and Milagros Mengíbar, among others.

Adelita Domingo era una maestra a la que iba todo el mundo: era la maestra de las artes escénicas globales.

Adelita Domingo was a teacher that everyone went to: she was the teacher of global performing arts.

— María Pagés

After a long illness, Adelita Domingo died in Seville on 31 July 2012. Burial was in the city's Cemetery of San Fernando.

== Awards and honours ==
She was awarded various distinctions and recognitions during her lifetime, including the medal she received in 2007 from the city of Seville from its then mayor, Alfredo Sánchez Monteseirín, and the Medal of Andalusia that was awarded to her in 2009. In addition, in 2001 she was awarded the 2001 Premio a la Mujer Sevillana.
