= Panadero =

Panadero is a Spanish surname. Notable people with the surname include:

- Gaspar Panadero (born 1997), Spanish footballer
- Carlos Castaño Panadero (born 1979), Spanish cyclist
- Vicente Guaita Panadero (born 1987), Spanish footballer
