= Bambera =

Bambera (Spanish pronunciation: [bamˈbeɾa]) is a cante, one of many traditional song forms associated with flamenco.

== Definition ==
The bambera or bamba derives from the cante de columpio, meaning "song of the swing", which is one of the traditional Andalusian song forms associated with flamenco. These songs were known as bambas or mecederos (from a Spanish word meaning 'to sway'), because they were sung to the rhythm of a swing.

Jose de Bisso in his Chronicle of the Province of Seville (1868) describes it thus:

The Vampas or Bambas is a double swing that is suspended from a heavy tree, the walnut tree, and crossed with a quite resistant plank; the pair that are rocked are placed in it while the group sings and pushes the swing. Each song sung by one of those in the group, is answered by one of those on the swing; but the unique thing about these occasions is that lovers get a chance to hear each other's complaints, jealousies, disdain, tenderness, gallantries, resentments, snubs etc. expressed through an improvised song with lively imagination and perspective and the release of contained passion.

== Origin ==
The origin of the bamba/bambera is ascribed to the flamenco singer known as Niña de los Peines (real name Pastora María Pavón Cruz 1890 – 1969), considered one of the most important voices in the history of the art. This song form was further developed by Naranjito de Triana who imposed the distinctive rhythmic pattern of 12 count soleá.

== Composition ==
The bamba has four octosyllabic lines or alternatively, a first and third line of seven syllables with a second and fourth line of five syllables. The first two lines are generally repeated at the end of each verse, or sometimes only the second line is repeated thus making a five line verse.

== Composers ==
The bamba has been recorded by many singers; among others are La Niña de los Peines, Enrique Morente, Carmen Linares and Rocío Jurado.

== Example of a bamba ==
Péinate tú con mis peines,

que mis peines son de azúcar,

quien con mis peines se peina,

hasta los dedos se chupa.

Péinate tú con mis peines,

mis peines son de canela,

la gachí que se peina con mis peines,

canela lleva de veras.

La Niña de los Peines (Pastora María Pavón Cruz)

La bamba está bien sujeta (The swing is holding well)
con una soga en ca lao (with a rope falling.)
meciéndote se te aprietan (to push you swinging)
mis manos a tu costao (My hands on your hips)

== Sources ==
- Spanish Wikipedia
