= Campanilleros =

A campanillero (Spanish pronunciation: [kampaniˈʝeɾo]) is a flamenco cante or song form. It is in couplets of six verses. It has its origin in sacred songs of Andalusia which were chanted during the early morning procession known as Rosario de la Aurora.

== History ==
The oldest extant examples of this song form are those of Manuel Torre. The most popular of these is La Niña de la Puebla (The Village Child). Other composers were Juan Varea, and El Agujeta. Today, these songs are sung by José Mercé and José Menese, among others.
