= Martinetes =

Spanish musical genre of the Flamenco

Martinetes (Spanish pronunciation: [maɾtiˈnetes], sing. martinete) are a flamenco palo belonging to the group of the tonás or cantes a palo seco. As the rest of the songs in this group, it is sung with no accompaniment. In some dance shows for the stage, though, it is accompanied by percussion played with the compás of siguiriya. The percussion instruments chosen for this are frequently a hammer and anvil, to evocate the origins of this palo, attributed to Gypsy smiths. It is not probable, though, that they were real work songs: they demand too much effort and faculties to be sung while carrying out a heavy task like that of a smith. They were more probably sung in family gatherings.

Although martinetes are often classified under the toná group on the grounds that they share its a cappella nature, the melody types differ strongly from the rest of tonás, so it is now generally considered to be a different palo. A characteristic that differentiates them from the tonás, normally in major mode, is their modulating character, constantly going from major to phrygian mode.

The stanza of the martinete is the cuarteta romanceada: four eight-syllable lines, rhyming in assonance abcb. The subject matters often contain allusions to persecution, prison, and the environment of the forges.

Carceleras are usually considered a subclassification of martinetes, with prison as the subject matter of their lyrics. The debla, a rather rare style, is considered by some flamenco fans as a type of martinete, while other consider it as a palo on its own.

== Sources ==
- Álvarez Caballero, Ángel: La discoteca ideal del flamenco, Planeta, 1995
- Martin Salazar, Jorge: Los cantes flamencos, Diputación Provincial de Granada
- Rossy, Hipólito: Teoría del cante jondo, Credsa, second edition, 1998 (first edition 1966)
