= Tonás =

Tonás (Spanish pronunciation: [toˈnas]) is a palo or type of flamenco songs. It belongs to the wider category of Cantes a palo seco, palos that are sung a cappella. Owing to this feature, they are considered by traditional flamencology to be the oldest surviving musical form of flamenco. This musical form originated in the Calé Romani subculture of Southern Spain. The first known flamenco singer, Tío Luis el de la Juliana, who lived in Jerez de la Frontera in the last third of the 18th century, was said to have excelled in this palo.

Other cantes a palo seco, such as martinetes and debla, are sometimes classified under tonás, while at other times they are referred to as palos on their own.

The tonás were almost in disuse by the end of the 19th century. The reason seems to be that they were considered a difficult style by the general public, and resulted in Tonás on the near verge of disappearing.

During the 1950s the tonás came back into use, with singers like Antonio Mairena, and came to be considered one of the main flamenco styles together with seguiriya and soleá.
