= Alboreá =

Music genre

Alboreá is a singing style whose name comes from alboradas singing which refers to albor ('dawn'). This singing has a Castilian origin.

Alboreá is rarely part of flamenco recitals because there is superstition of bad luck should it be sung for anything that is not a gypsy wedding. It is usually sung in gypsy marriage rites and their lyrics are linked to this topic. For gypsy singers, this style should be kept for weddings and not be sung outside of these ceremonies.

Its lyrics should be accompanied by 4 seven-syllable verses and a refrain. It is often sung with a libre (no beat structure) beginning followed by a 12 count measure, which can also sound like an abandolao rhythm in a 6 count measure, similar to bulerías.

== Discography ==
- Magna antología del cante flamenco, vol. III, CD Edition, compiled by José Blas Vega, Hispavox, 1992

== Sources ==
- https://flamenco.one/en/glossary/alborea/
- ÁLVAREZ CABALLERO, Ángel: La discoteca ideal del flamenco, Editorial Planeta, Barcelona, 1995 ISBN 978-84-08-01602-1
