= Garrotín =

Spanish musical genre and dance

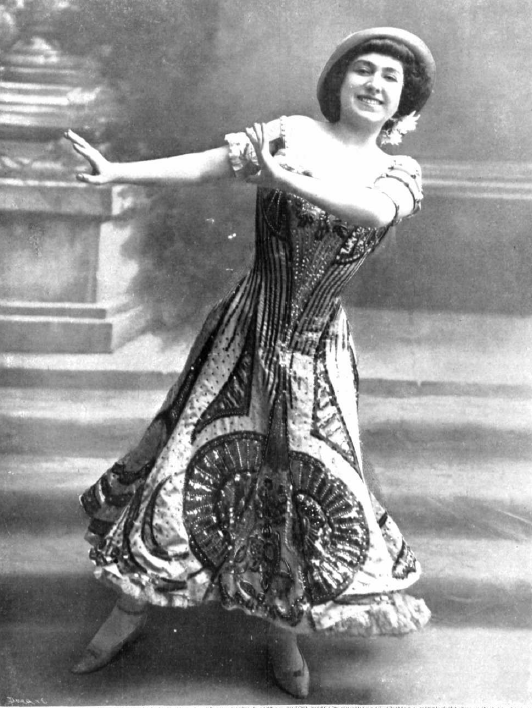
Julia Fons dancing the garrotín at the Teatro Eslava, 1911

Garrotín is a style of improvised song, featuring (palo) flamenco singing, dancing, and guitar playing, which developed near the end of the nineteenth century in Asturias, in northern Spain. It is played or sung in a Major mode, and a simple 2/4 meter, and has a cheerful and festive character. After being introduced into the flamenco repertoire, garrotín was further developed by singer Pastora Pavón ("Niña de los Peines"), and has been recently popularized by dancer, Carmen Amaya.

== Style ==
Garrotín is sung in 2/4 metres, normally with 8 syllables per line. It consists of a fixed chorus with a rhythmic melody, and the stanzas are improvised as they are sung. The content of the stanzas is usually burlesque or ironic, with the sole purpose of amusing the people who listen to it. The chorus, which is sung between each stanza to allow time for the next person to prepare, usually follows this pattern:

Al garrotín, al garrotan,

de la vera vera vera de Sant Joan;

al garrotín, al garrotan,

de la vera vera vera de Sant Joan.

In the verses, it is only the second and fourth lines that rhyme.

== Videos ==
- "Garrotín de LLeida" interpretat pel grup lleidatà La Violeta. Cançó i ball típics recuperats pel grup La Violeta. Cafè del Teatre (LLeida), 2006
- Concurs de garrotins a la taverna de la Fira Mediterrània de Manresa, novembre del 2007 (YouTube.com) Sopar popular celebrat a la Fira Mediterrània of Manresa .
- "Garrotins al Combat de Corrandes" a Santa Pau, la Garrotxa, març del 2009 (YouTube.com)
- Garrotins al concert de Miquel del Roig a Roda de Ter el 2010
