= Sacromonte =

Neighbourhood of Granada, Spain

Coordinates: 37°10′51″N 3°35′34″W

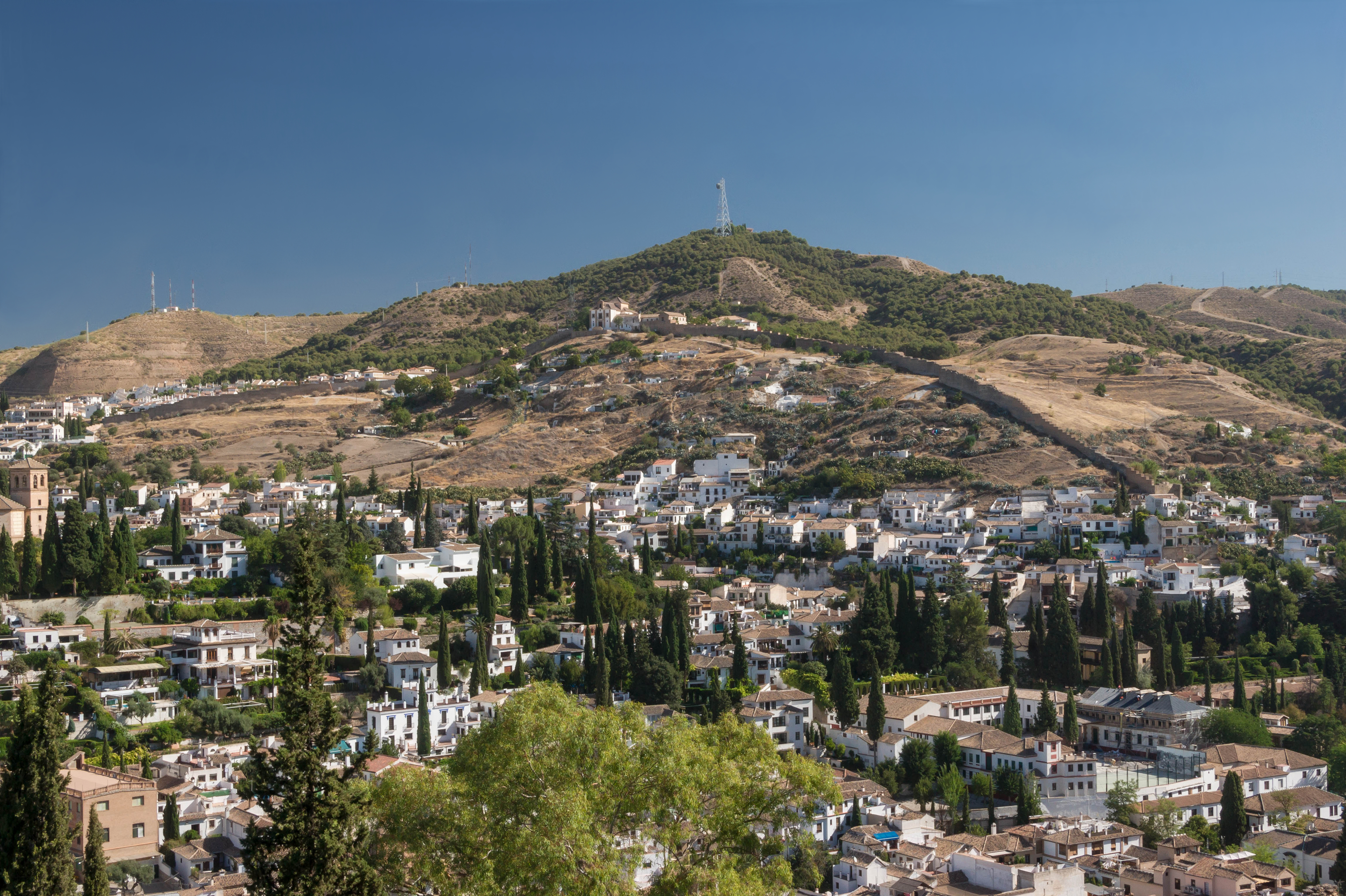
View of the Sacromonte from the Alhambra

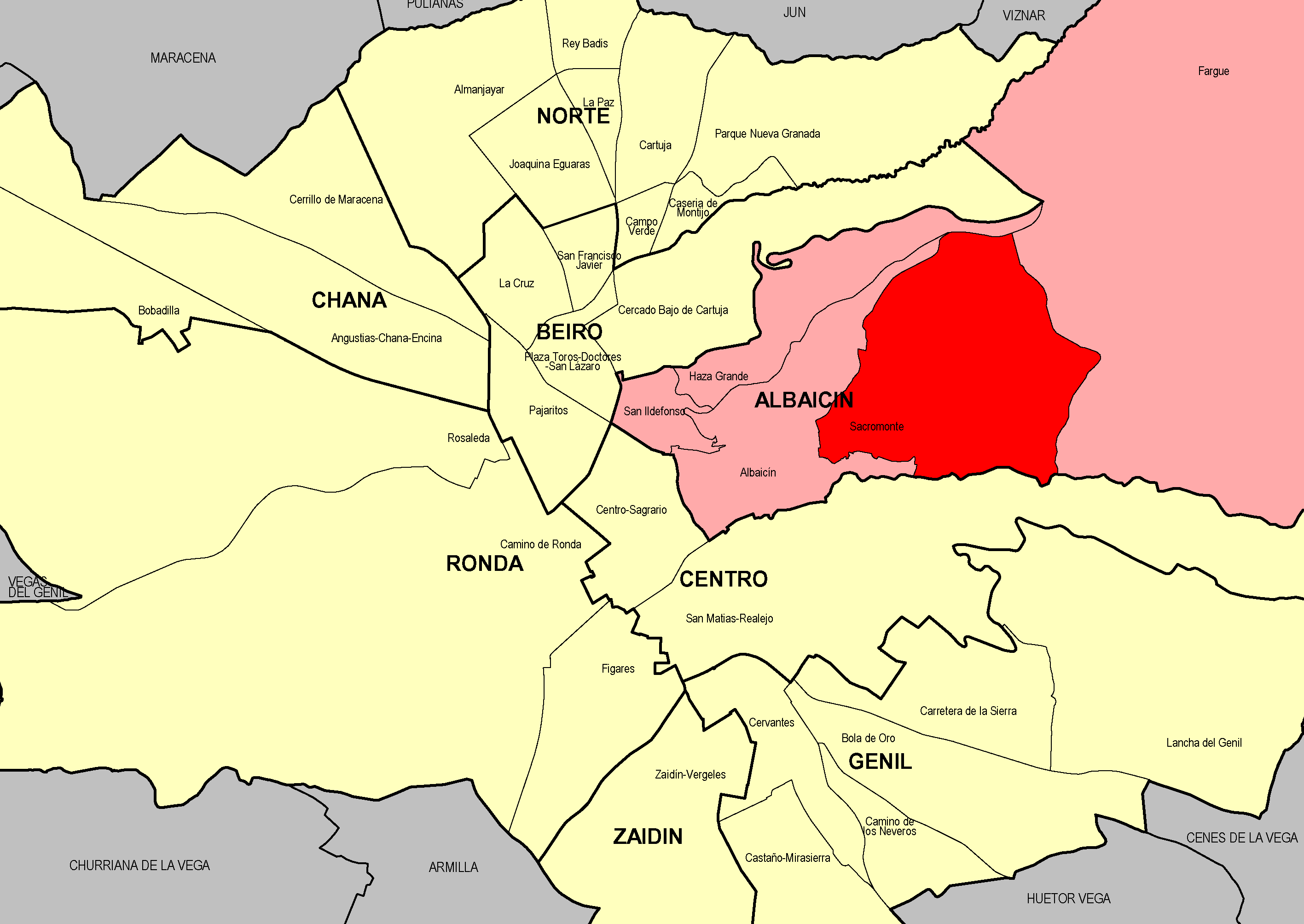
Location of the neighborhood of Sacromonte in Granada

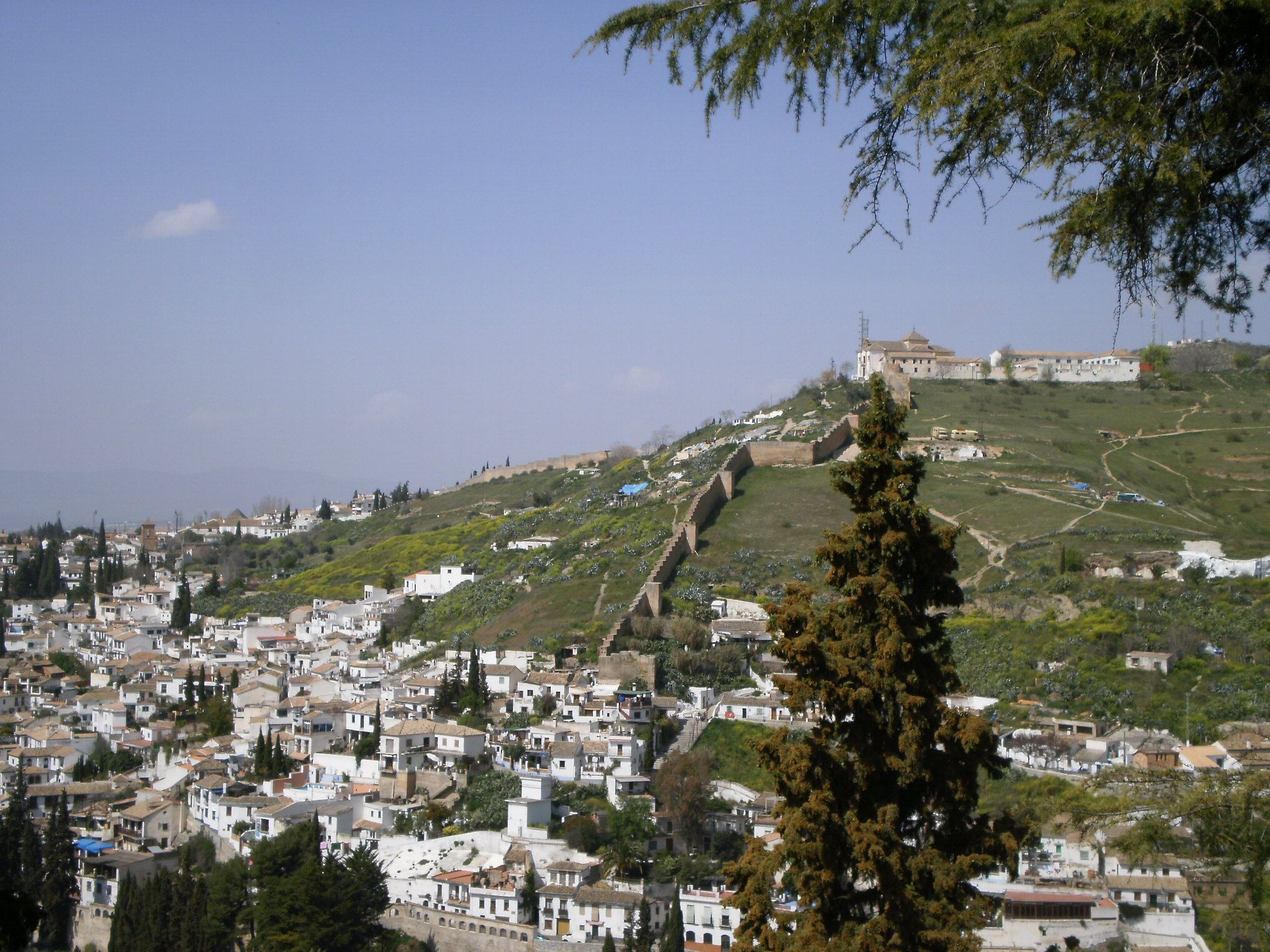
View of Sacromonte

Sacromonte, sometimes also called Sacramonte, is a traditional neighbourhood in the eastern area of the city of Granada in Andalusia, Spain. It is one of the six neighbourhoods that make up the urban district of Albayzín and borders the neighbourhoods of Albayzín, San Pedro, Realejo-San Matías, El Fargue and Haza Grande.

It is located on the hillside and in the valley of Valparaíso, opposite the Alhambra – emblem of Granada. The neighbourhood occupies both banks of the Darro river, whose name seems to be derived from the phrase "d'auro" ("of gold") because of its famous gold-bearing sediments.

Traditionally the neighborhood of the Granadian Romani, who settled in Granada after the Christian conquest of the city in 1492, it is one of the most picturesque neighbourhoods of the city, with cave houses installed in whitewashed caves.

The Romani of Sacromonte have a mixed language known as Caló, which has seen a rapid decline in use over the past century. It is derived from India, where the Romani originated. The Romani of Sacromonte were famously portrayed by the poet Federico García Lorca in his book of poems Romancero Gitano.

== Etymology ==
The neighborhood owes its name to an episode which occurred between 1595 and 1599 on the hill of Valparaíso: the supposed discovery of relics and the so-called "lead books" or "Lead Books of Sacromonte", containing indecipherable drawings and texts in Latin and Arabic characters, which came to be interpreted by some as the fifth gospel. These findings were declared a forgery in the 17th century, but nonetheless led to the construction of the Abbey of Sacromonte, where the supposed relics of Saint Caecilius (co-patron of Granada) and the lead books are now kept.

== Origin of the caves ==
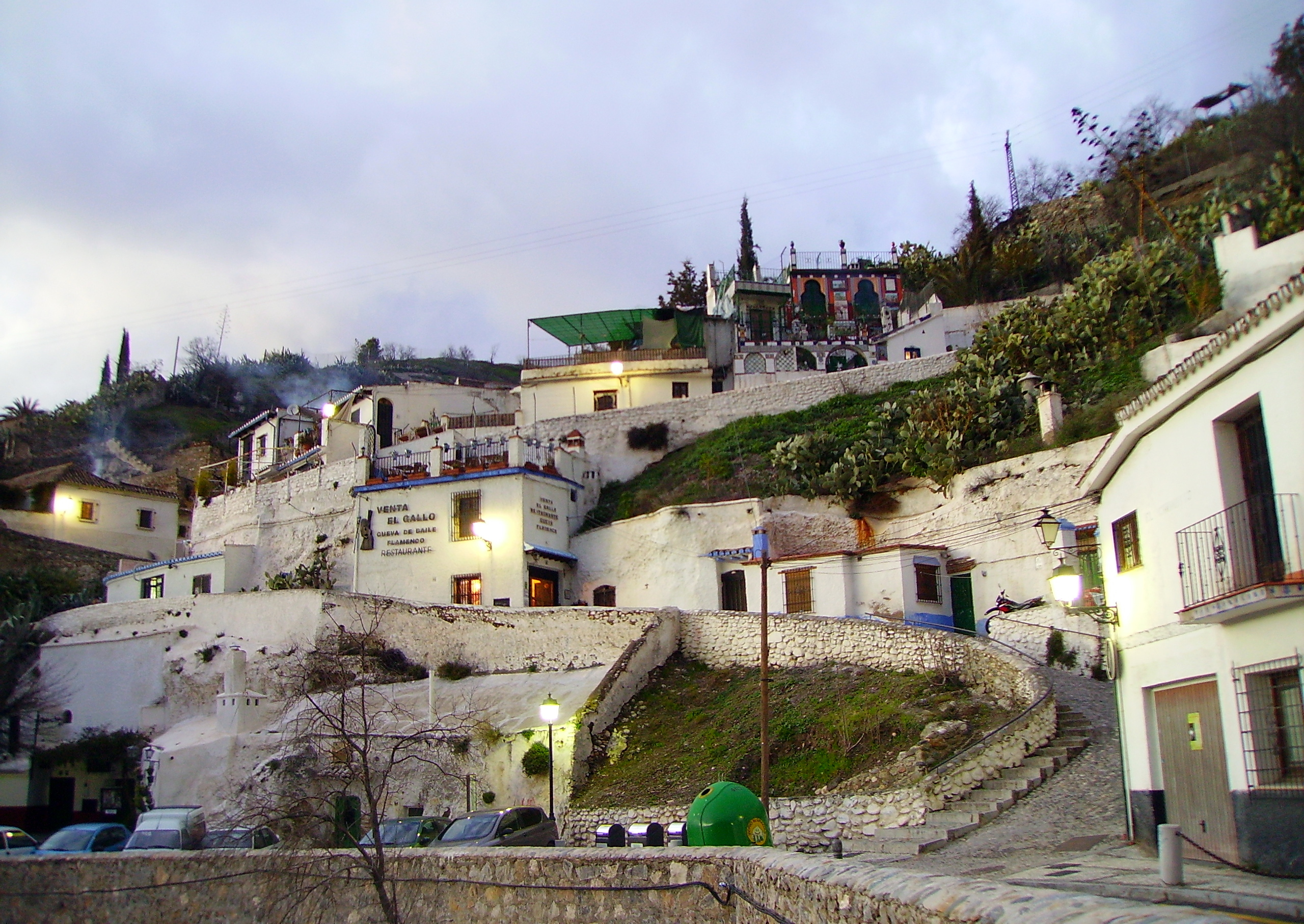
Some of the famous caves (troglodyte houses) of Sacromonte

The origin of the houses excavated on the slopes of Sacromonte, the traditional dwelling type of the neighbourhood, is not very clear. It is assumed that they began to be built from the 16th century, after the Jewish and Muslim populations were expelled from their homes, and intermixed with the nomadic Romani, adopting some of their customs. The caves became housing for the marginalised, located outside the walls of the city, which meant being outside of administrative and ecclesiastical control, particularly the Spanish Inquisition. To dig a cave it was necessary to carve away a part of the face of the hill where they wanted to build, making a vertical cut that served as a facade. The builder then inserted an arch at the midpoint to serve as a door. They then excavated as much space for rooms as the terrain would allow.

The forms and limits of this house type are determined by the terrain, altitude and extent of the hills where the excavation takes place, so there are no two identical caves. These elements, along with the paths, gullies, small squares, whitewashed facades and interiors form a landscape, alongside the customs and crafts of their inhabitants, giving the neighbourhood a distinct character.

In addition to the troglodyte houses, another important feature of the neighbourhood is the legends that relate to all corners and places, one of the most well-known being the Ravine of the Blacks.

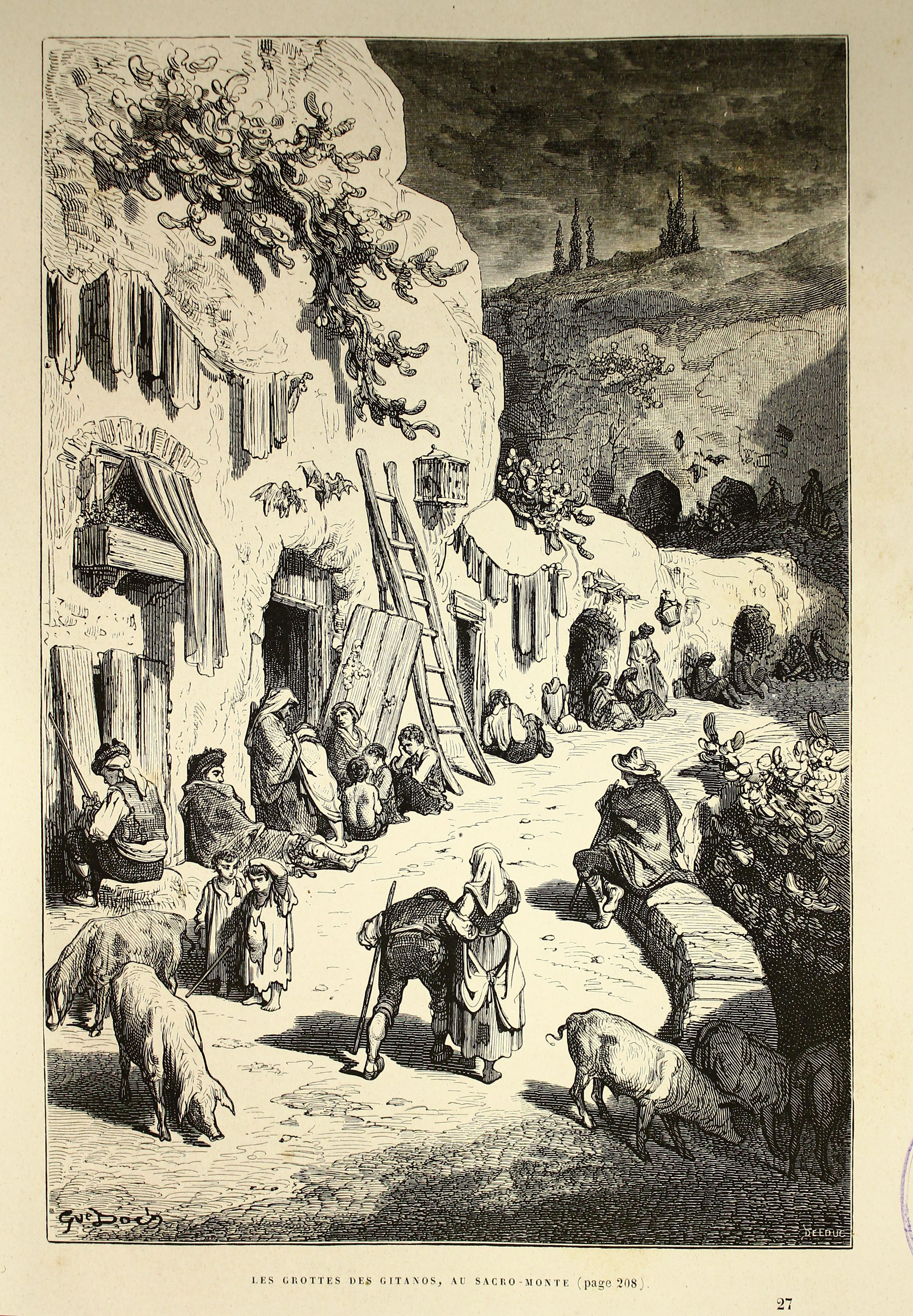
The caves of the Gipsies at Sacromonte by Gustave Doré in L'Espagne

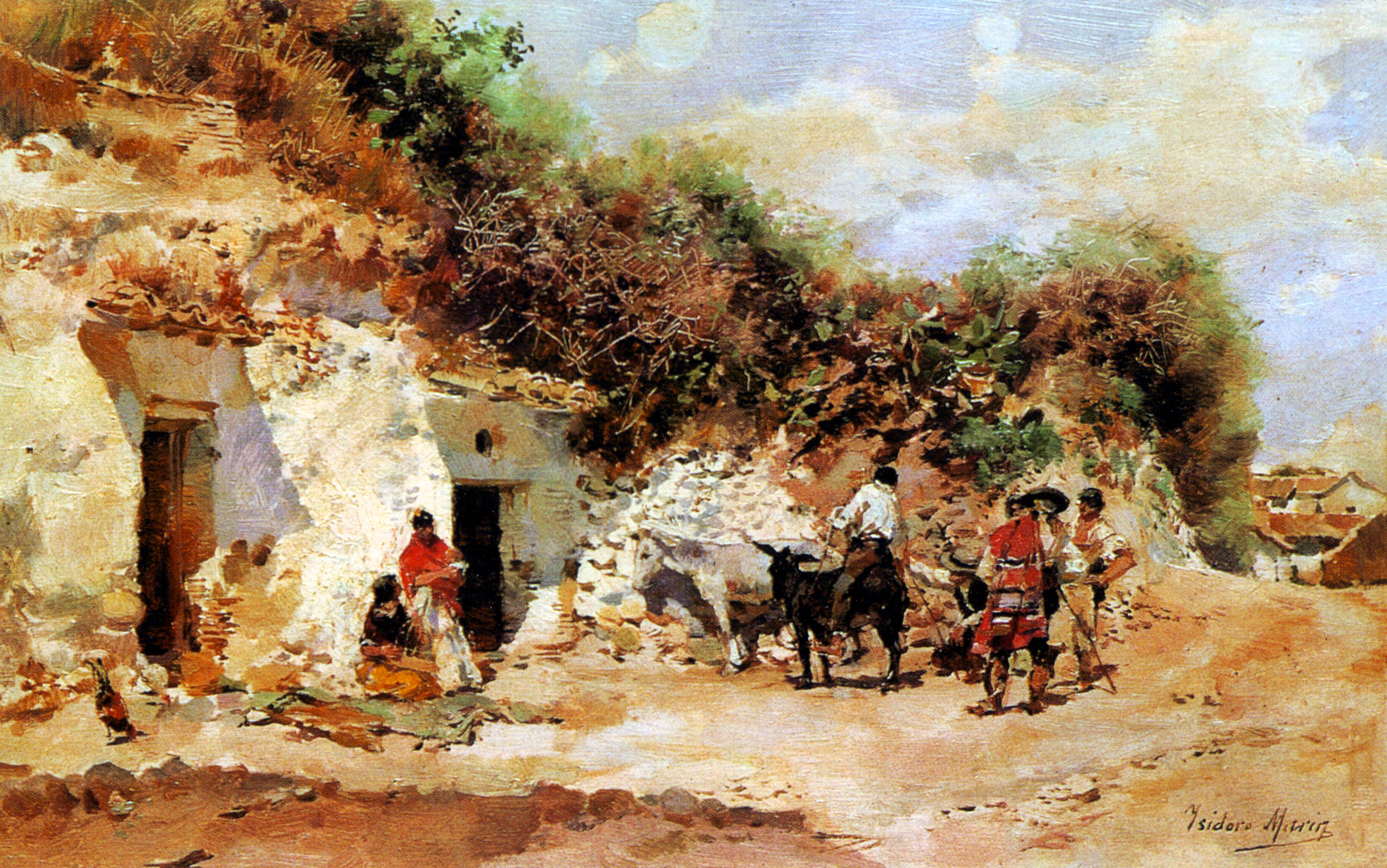
El trato by the Granadan Isidoro Marín Gares (1863 - 1926)

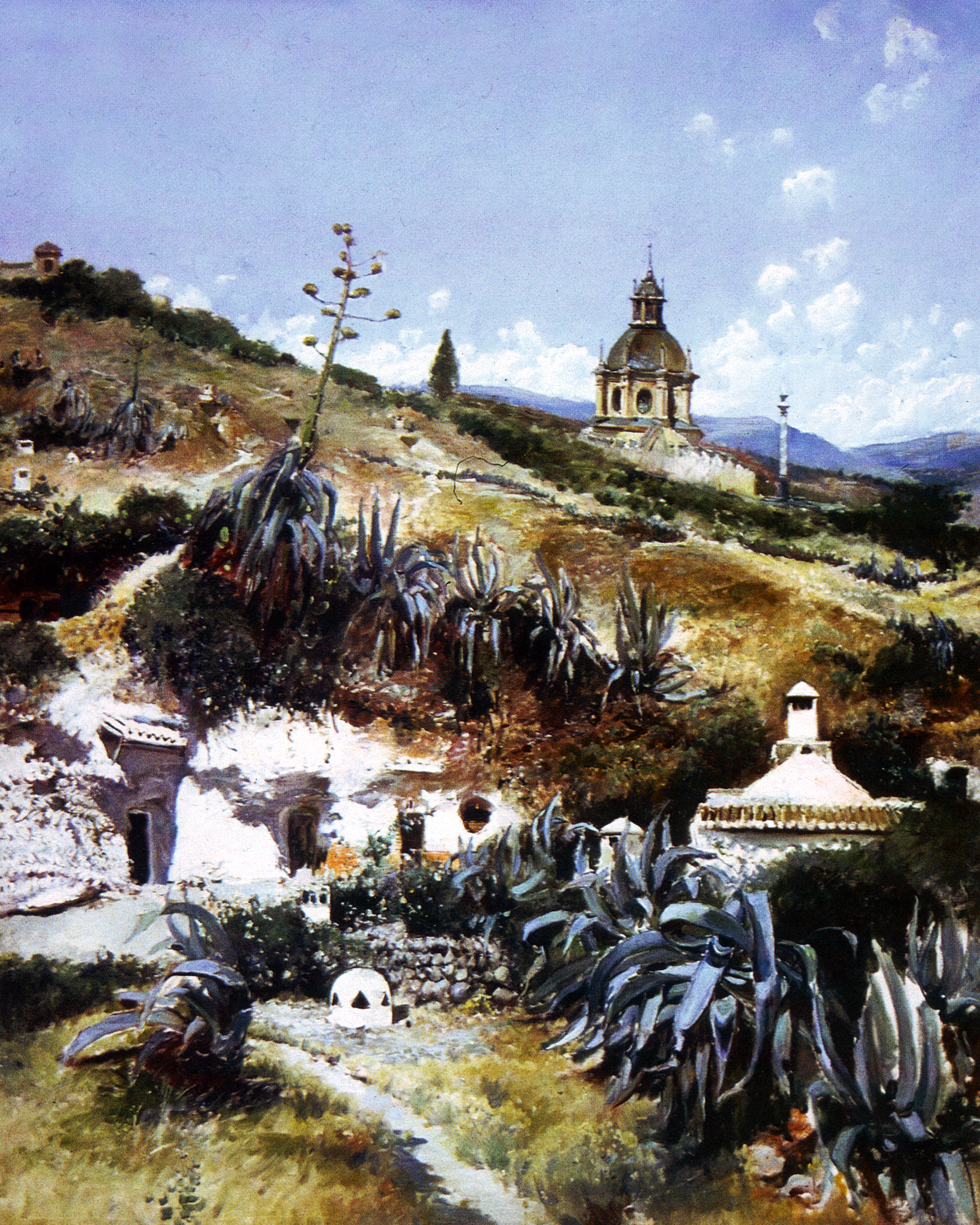
Dome of the Abbey of Sacromonte and caves dwellings by Antonio Gomar y Gomar (1849 - 1911). Currently this dome of the Sacromonte Abbey is derelict.

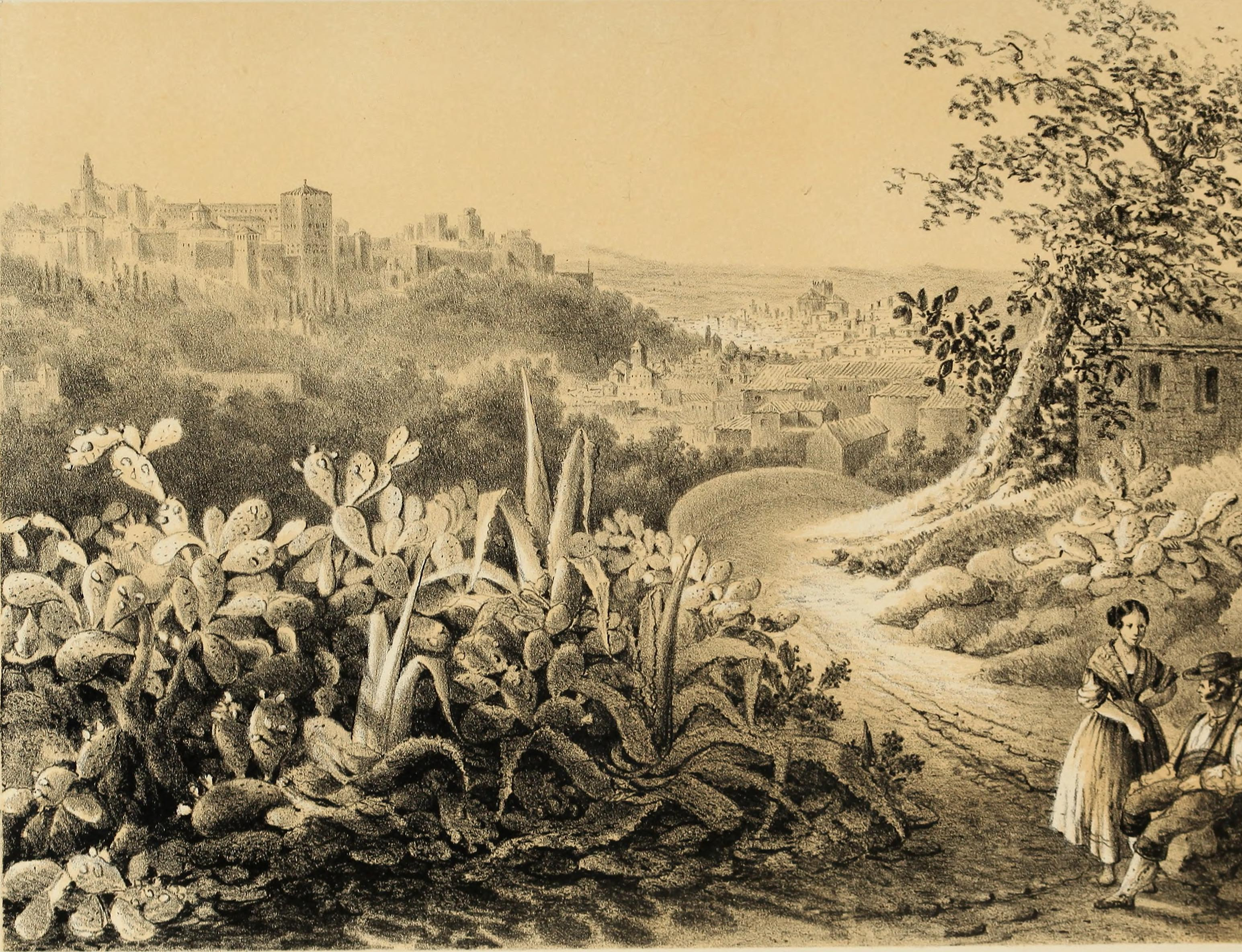
View of the Alhambra from the cactuses of Sacromonte by Francesco Xavier Parcerisa in 1850, in Recuerdos y bellezas de España.

== A neighbourhood legend: Ravine of the Blacks (Barranco de los Negros) ==
Popular legends hold that after the loss of Granada to the Catholic Monarchs in the Granada War, the formerly ruling Arabs – who made their way in exile to African lands – never gave up hope of someday returning to the city of their parents and grandparents, where they and their children were born.

Afraid of being preyed upon by bandits or groups of renegade Christian soldiers on the roads to the ports of Almuñécar or Almería, where they embarked for Africa, they hid great treasures among the olive groves which at the time covered Sacromonte.

At the same time, they granted freedom to the many slaves owned by the noble Arab families, because of the expense and difficulty of performing the journey with a large entourage. Many of these slaves were black, and had noticed the comings and goings of their former owners to Mount Valparaíso (as the area was then called), were aware of their former owners' fears and had overheard many conversations between them regarding burying their possessions. Granted their freedom but without work or belongings, many decided to climb the mountain and recover for themselves the treasures that had once belonged to their former owners.

They dug and dug into the slopes of the ravine reportedly without success, and exhausted by the effort but left with no alternative shelter, decided to condition the resulting caves and make them their homes. This gave the area the name of "Ravine of the Blacks", as these were believed to be the first inhabitants.

In later years, as Roma began to settle in the area, they supposedly attempted to use many spells in search of the exact places where the treasures were hidden. Many older witches, known as ferminibí, were reported to try talking with water and others with fire, or staring unblinkingly into basins of water, trying to get some clues to the locations of the lost treasures. To this day it is unknown whether any were discovered and secretly taken away by treasure seekers, or if the treasures remain hidden in the area.

== Other sights ==
Sacromonte Caves Museum, Darro Valley Interpretation Centre.

This Museum opened its doors in 2002 and occupies a space of 4800 square metres in which up to 11 caves have been recovered for viewing in their original state as maintained by their inhabitants. The aim of the museum is to make known and help understand the culture, history and natural environment of the Darro River Valley (a Site of Cultural Interest since 2016). Through these 11 caves visitors can recognize the cave-house, the stable, the traditional trades (basketry, forge, loom, pottery), a cave exclusively dedicated to the history of flamenco in the Sacromonte and another one specialized in troglodyte architecture in the world.

Escuelas del Ave María. They were founded by Don Andrés Manjón – better known as "Father Manjón" – at the beginning of the 20th century to teach gypsy children and whose pedagogical innovations are still in force.

Abadia del Sacromonte. Another monument of the Sacromonte is Abadía, built by the archbishop Don Pedro de Castro in the 17th century where the supposed relics and other testimonios of what would have been the first Christians of Granada appeared, among them San Cecilio, who was made his first bishop, as early as the first century, and some other apostolic men, companions of Santiago. A very important library, with numerous incunabula and manuscripts, has been preserved and is now closed, as have the forgeries of the so-called "Lead Books", in which Cecilio was presented as a disciple of Santiago and the first bishop of Granada. The abbey is the canonical seat of the gypsy brotherhood. There is a mass every Sunday at 12:00. Next to the abbey are the catacombs or holy caves where various chapels are preserved, one of which tradition says that Santiago el Menor came to officiate. The pilgrimage of San Cecilio takes place there on the first Sunday in February.
Zambras:
Cueva de Curro Albaicín. FRANCISCO GUARDIA CONTRERAS, gypsy singer, known by the artistic name of CURRO ALBAICIN, was born in the Sacromonte neighbourhood, Granada, on 22 January 1948, into a family with a long flamenco tradition, "Los Cabreras", and grew up among the local artists Mario Maya, Manolete, Los Heredias, Los Habichuelas and Los Amayas. Curro Albaicin has also been asked to sing or organize parties for a number of personalities from the world of politics and culture, the kings of Spain on several occasions and those of Syria, the former kings of Greece, Bill Clinton, Antonio Gala, Ian Gibson, Luis Rosales, Pedro Almodovar and Paco Rabal among many others. In 1985, in a personal attempt to recover the almost extinct Zambra of Sacromonte, Curro gathered all the veteran artists of Sacromonte. In 1992, he edited the book Cancionero del Sacromonte. This first book was followed by "Zambra y flamencos del Sacromonte" and he has prepared the edition of another one entitled "La decadencia del Sacromonte". He has written opinion columns for the newspapers Ideal and La Opinión de Granada. In 2002, his book "Cartas de amor y odio" appeared in which he gives his personal vision of politics, feelings and art. He is also the author of a tragicomedy entitled "Los amantes del Fracaso"

Cueva de la Rocío. was one of the first gypsy villages in Sacromonte, a district of Granada. Founded by Andrés Maya Fajardo and Rocío Fernándaz Bustamante in 1951, this cave is still in the hands of the Maya family, one of the most important families in the flamenco world. In Rocio's cave, a show called "Zambra Gitana" is produced every night, a musical and dance genre inspired by Sacromonte's flamenco rituals, such as gypsy weddings.

Fiestas Pilgrimage of San Cecilio In Granada, San Cecilio is celebrated (first Sunday in February) with a pilgrimage to Sacromonte. The carnival – in February – and the Day of Mariana Pineda – in May – acquire more importance every year and the Semana Santa Holy week has reached a spectacular development. The Sacromonte district celebrates its festivals in the first ten days of August.

Popular Festivals of the Sacromonte Organised by the Sacromonte Neighbourhood Association, one of the oldest in the city, they are held on the first weekend in September, and among the festivals and popular meals, the old and famous Pasacalles de Disfraces (Costume Parade) is held on Sunday, where, accompanied by a group, the neighbours parade in costume through the whole neighbourhood, invading the neighbouring Albaicin with music and a lot of cheek.

== Famous Sacromontines ==
- Chorrojumo

== See also ==
- Sacromonte Caves Museum
- Zambra, a dance which originated in this Granadian neighbourhood

== Notes ==
- Translated from the Portuguese and Spanish Wikipedias
