= Farruca =

Flamenco palo

Farruca (Spanish pronunciation: [faˈruka]) is a palo, or musical form, of flamenco. It developed as a flamenco style in the late nineteenth and early twentieth centuries and is usually classified among the lighter or more stylized forms of flamenco, often described as a cante chico. The form is traditionally associated with Galicia or with Galician musical imagery, although its precise geographical origin has not been established with certainty. The Instituto Andaluz del Flamenco defines the farruca as a cante of non-Andalusian folkloric origin that has become aflamencado, that is, adapted into flamenco style.

The modern theatrical and instrumental form of the farruca is closely associated with the guitarist Ramón Montoya and the dancer Faíco, who helped establish it as a dance and guitar piece in the early twentieth century. Since then, farruca has become especially important as a vehicle for flamenco dance and solo guitar. It is often performed in A minor, with a sober and dramatic character, and is traditionally associated with masculine styling, sharply marked footwork and strong stage presence.

Although the farruca was traditionally sung and danced by men, women dancers have also performed and transformed the style. Earlier female interpreters sometimes danced it in male clothing, while later performers such as Carmen Amaya and Sara Baras created well-known versions that expanded the expressive possibilities of the form.

== Name and etymology ==
The word farruca is related to farruco, a term used in Andalusia with several meanings. Some sources state that farruco was used in Andalusia to refer to people from Galicia or Asturias, especially migrants from northern Spain. It has also been used as a familiar form of the name Francisco. Because of this, the title of the palo has usually been connected with northern Spanish, and especially Galician, associations.

A further proposed etymology derives the word from Arabic faruq, meaning "brave" or "valiant". This interpretation is sometimes invoked to explain the bold, austere or defiant character associated with the dance, but it is not universally accepted.

The feminine form farruca may also refer, in the traditional letra, to a Galician woman. One of the best-known farruca verses begins with the image of "una farruca en Galicia" crying bitterly for the death of a farruco who played the bagpipes. This imagery has contributed to the association between the palo and Galicia.

== Origins and development ==
The origin of the farruca is uncertain. The traditional explanation links it to Galicia, and several features have been interpreted as signs of a northern Spanish source: the title, the references to Galicia in the letras, the mention of the Galician bagpipe, and the use of vocables such as tran tran tran treiro. Flamencopolis notes, however, that the geographic origin of the form has not been scientifically proven.

A cautious way to describe the farruca is therefore to say that it is a flamenco form with a non-Andalusian folkloric association, probably connected in memory and imagery with Galicia, but shaped musically and theatrically within flamenco. The Instituto Andaluz del Flamenco places it with other cantes of non-Andalusian folkloric origin that became aflamencados. In this respect it is often discussed alongside the garrotín, another palo usually considered to have non-Andalusian folkloric roots.

The farruca seems to have entered flamenco practice relatively late compared with older palos such as soleá, seguiriyas or tangos. Its modern flamenco form is strongly connected with the stage environment of the early twentieth century, when flamenco dance, theatrical presentation and solo guitar were developing in close contact. Some writers have connected its melodic world with theatrical songs and zarzuela, including José Serrano's Alma de Dios of 1907, which contains a song sometimes compared with the flamenco farruca.

== Ramón Montoya and Faíco ==
The best-known account of the modern farruca credits the flamenco dancer Faíco and the guitarist Ramón Montoya with giving the form its classic dance and guitar shape. Faíco, whose full name was Francisco Mendoza Ríos, was a Sevillian dancer active in the early twentieth century. His name is especially associated with the development of both the farruca and the garrotín as danced flamenco forms.

According to the traditional account, Montoya provided or consolidated the characteristic guitar material for Faíco's dance. The result was highly successful and helped make farruca a standard vehicle for male flamenco dance. The form was then stylized and expanded by other dancers, including Antonio de Bilbao, Manolito la Rosa and El Batato. Later interpreters such as Antonio Gades, El Güito, Mario Maya and Manolete also contributed to the continuing stage image of the farruca as a dramatic male dance.

Montoya's role is also important because the farruca became one of the flamenco forms most closely associated with guitar solo performance. Paco Peña notes that the dance adaptation attributed to Montoya is seldom sung and is commonly played in A minor. This helped give the farruca an identity not only as a cante, but also as a guitar and dance form.

== Musical characteristics ==
The farruca is normally performed in a binary or quadruple metre. In guitar pedagogy it is often counted as two measures of 4/4, with strong accents on the first, third, fifth and seventh beats:

[1] 2 [3] 4 [5] 6 [7] 8

This accent pattern is closely related to the compás used in tangos and tientos, but the farruca has a different melodic and harmonic character. Studio Flamenco describes the basic pulse as a four-count pattern with a strong first beat.

The farruca is commonly played in A minor. In this setting the guitar accompaniment often alternates between E7 and A minor, with characteristic melodic figures and cadences. Pedagogical guitar sources commonly describe a basic accompaniment in the area of:

E7 – A minor

and a common cadential pattern such as:

D minor – A minor – E7 – A minor

These patterns should not be treated as fixed rules. Flamenco guitarists vary the harmony, bass movement, rasgueado patterns and falsetas according to the dancer, the singer, the tempo and the performance context. Nevertheless, the A minor setting and the strong E7–A minor pull are central to the standard modern sound of the farruca.

The mood of the music is often described as austere, serious or sombre. Compared with more festive binary palos such as tangos or rumba, the farruca tends to use sharper pauses, more dramatic contrasts, and a controlled rhythmic drive suited to footwork and theatrical presentation.

== Cante and lyrics ==
Although the farruca can be sung, modern performance often treats it primarily as a guitar or dance form. Paco Peña describes Montoya's dance adaptation as seldom sung. Studio Flamenco similarly notes that for many years the farruca was often performed without singing, especially as a male dance to guitar accompaniment.

Traditional letras, however, are important for understanding the palo's imagery. A common farruca letra is:

Una farruca en Galicia
amargamente lloraba
porque a la farruca
se le había muerto el farruco
que la gaita le tocaba

The verse refers explicitly to Galicia and to the gaita, or bagpipe, reinforcing the northern Spanish association of the form. In performance, singers may vary the text, omit lines, repeat lines, or use vocables as an opening or closing device.

One characteristic feature of farruca cante is the use of nonsensical or semi-nonsensical syllables such as tran tran tran treiro. These vocables are often interpreted as suggesting Galician or northern Spanish color, although they also function musically as rhythmic and melodic material within the flamenco performance.

The melodic line of the cante is sometimes described as having a descending contour at the end of the verse, especially on the vowel a. This descent has been used as another argument for a connection with Galician melodic style, but the connection remains interpretive rather than historically proven.

== Guitar accompaniment ==
The farruca occupies an important place in flamenco guitar because it can be performed as a dance accompaniment, as a cante accompaniment, or as an instrumental solo. The standard A minor setting gives guitarists a clear tonal framework, while the compás allows dramatic tempo changes and extended footwork sections.

A typical accompaniment may include:

- an introduction or falseta;
- a marked compás in A minor;
- llamadas or cadential phrases used to cue the dancer;
- material for the sung letra, if a singer is present;
- an escobilla accompaniment for extended footwork;
- accelerations or tempo changes leading to a closing section.

One commonly cited basic pattern is a bar or phrase centered on E7 followed by A minor. A more extended llamada or cadence often moves through D minor, A minor, E7 and A minor. Guitarists may also use silence, golpes, rasgueado patterns and bass-line movement to emphasize the dancer's stops, turns and remates.

The farruca's role in the concert guitar repertory is connected with Ramón Montoya's broader importance in raising the status of solo flamenco guitar. Later guitarists, including Sabicas, Carlos Montoya, Paco Peña and Manolo Sanlúcar, have performed or recorded farrucas as solo guitar pieces. In guitar contexts the farruca often emphasizes clarity of compás, minor-key lyricism and sharply articulated rhythmic passages.

== Dance ==
The farruca is especially known as a dance form. Traditionally it has been associated with male dancers and with a style emphasizing sobriety, controlled force, fast turns, strong footwork, dramatic poses and abrupt changes of direction. It is often danced with a serious expression and a proud or defiant posture.

The original modern dance version is traditionally attributed to the Sevillian dancer Faíco, accompanied by Ramón Montoya. The success of this version helped establish the farruca as a standard piece in the flamenco dance repertory. Subsequent dancers stylized and expanded it, including El Gato, Antonio de Bilbao, Manolito la Rosa, El Batato and Antonio Gades.

The dance often includes fast footwork, held poses, sudden pauses, turns, changes of level, and bursts of filigrana or ornamental movement. Older descriptions also mention the possibility of dancing farruca with a cape, emphasizing its theatrical and masculine associations. The form's relatively simple four-count compás makes it suitable for long escobillas, while the dramatic minor-key music gives the dancer a wide expressive range.

== Dance structure ==
The exact structure of a farruca varies by performer, but a staged version may include several of the following sections:

- salida or entrance;
- guitar introduction or falseta;
- marked compás;
- llamada;
- letra, if sung;
- remates responding to the singer or guitarist;
- escobilla, or extended footwork section;
- subida, or acceleration;
- final llamada or cierre;
- possible closing section in a related rhythm.

Because the farruca is often dance-centered, the order and length of these sections depend heavily on the choreography. A performance may begin slowly, with the dancer entering in a controlled walk or pose, or it may begin with strong footwork. The llamada is especially important because it signals transitions between sections and coordinates dancer, guitarist and singer.

In many modern performances the farruca builds toward one or more long escobillas. These footwork passages may accelerate gradually, creating a dramatic contrast between the solemn opening and the more virtuosic conclusion. Some dancers end the piece within the farruca compás, while others close with a faster related section.

== Gender and performance tradition ==
The farruca is one of the flamenco palos most strongly associated with masculine dance. Madeleine Claus describes it as traditionally sung and danced by men. Its conventional vocabulary includes upright posture, contained arm movement, forceful zapateado, sharp turns and dramatic pauses, all of which came to be read as masculine within twentieth-century flamenco stage aesthetics.

This association, however, has never meant that only men danced farruca. Claus notes that women dancers also performed the farruca, including Rafaela Valverde "La Tanguera", although some early female dancers adopted male clothing when dancing it. Carmen Amaya famously challenged gender expectations in flamenco through her powerful footwork and stage persona, and her farruca performances became part of that broader transformation. Sara Baras has also created a well-known modern farruca, bringing the form into contemporary large-scale flamenco staging.

The gender history of the farruca is therefore double. On the one hand, the palo preserves a strong association with male dance and with a sober, valiant stage image. On the other hand, women dancers have repeatedly used it to display technical power, authority and alternative forms of flamenco femininity.

== Relationship to other palos ==
The farruca is a binary-metre palo and is often discussed near tangos, tientos, garrotín and rumba flamenca. It shares with tangos and tientos a four-beat rhythmic environment, but its standard minor-key setting, theatrical sobriety and dance vocabulary give it a different character.

The farruca is especially close historically to the garrotín. Both are often classified as cantes of non-Andalusian folkloric origin that became aflamencados. Both also became important in staged flamenco in the early twentieth century and are associated with Faíco in accounts of flamenco dance history.

The farruca is also sometimes contrasted with rumba flamenca. Rumba tends to have a more flowing, festive and open guitar accompaniment, while the farruca is usually more compact, solemn and sharply marked. Unlike free-rhythm cantes, the farruca is strongly compás-based and depends on clear rhythmic coordination among guitar, dance, palmas and, when present, cante.

== Notable interpreters ==
Figures commonly associated with the historical development or performance of farruca include Ramón Montoya and Faíco, whose collaboration is central to the modern form. Other dancers and choreographers associated with the development or stylization of the farruca include Antonio de Bilbao, Manolito la Rosa, El Batato, El Gato, Antonio Gades, El Güito, Mario Maya and Manolete.

Women dancers associated with farruca include Rafaela Valverde "La Tanguera", Carmen Amaya and Sara Baras. In guitar performance, the farruca has been cultivated by concert and flamenco guitarists including Ramón Montoya, Sabicas, Carlos Montoya, Paco Peña and Manolo Sanlúcar.

== See also ==
- Palo (flamenco)
- Tango (flamenco)
- Garrotín
- Flamenco guitar
- Flamenco dance

== Bibliography ==
- Madeleine Claus (1990). Claus Schreiner (ed.). Flamenco: Gypsy Dance and Music from Andalusia. Molly Comerford Peters (trans.). Portland, OR: Amadeus Press. Archived from the original on 2015-07-04 – via Questia.
- Peña, Paco. Toques Flamenco. Music Sales. ISBN 0-7119-9798-5.
- Goldberg, K. Meira; Bennahum, Ninotchka Devorah; Hayes, Michelle Heffner (2015). Flamenco on the Global Stage: Historical, Critical and Theoretical Perspectives. McFarland. ISBN 9780786494705.
