= Tarantas =

Style of Flamenco music

Tarantas and Taranto are two related styles (palos) of Flamenco music, that originated in the Andalusian province of Almería. Each is characterized by a shared modality (F-sharp Phrygian) and harmonic progression (Bm–A7–G–F-sharp), but differ significantly with respect to rhythm and meter. Tarantas is a cante libre (or toque libre, if played as a solo), meaning that it lacks both a regular rhythmic pattern (compás, in flamenco terminology) and a regular rhythmic unit (or beat). It can be sung or played, but not danced. Taranto, conversely, has a regular 2/4-meter, and is danceable. When played on, or accompanied by, the guitar, both palos have a unique and characteristic sound that is created, in part, by dissonances that result from the use of the guitar's first three open strings (E, B, and G, respectively), in combination with harmonies and melodies based on the F-sharp Phrygian mode.
