= Zambra (dance) =

Style of flamenco dance

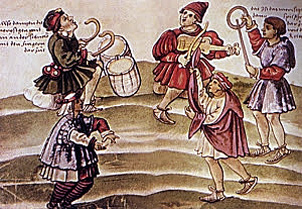
Drawing of zambra

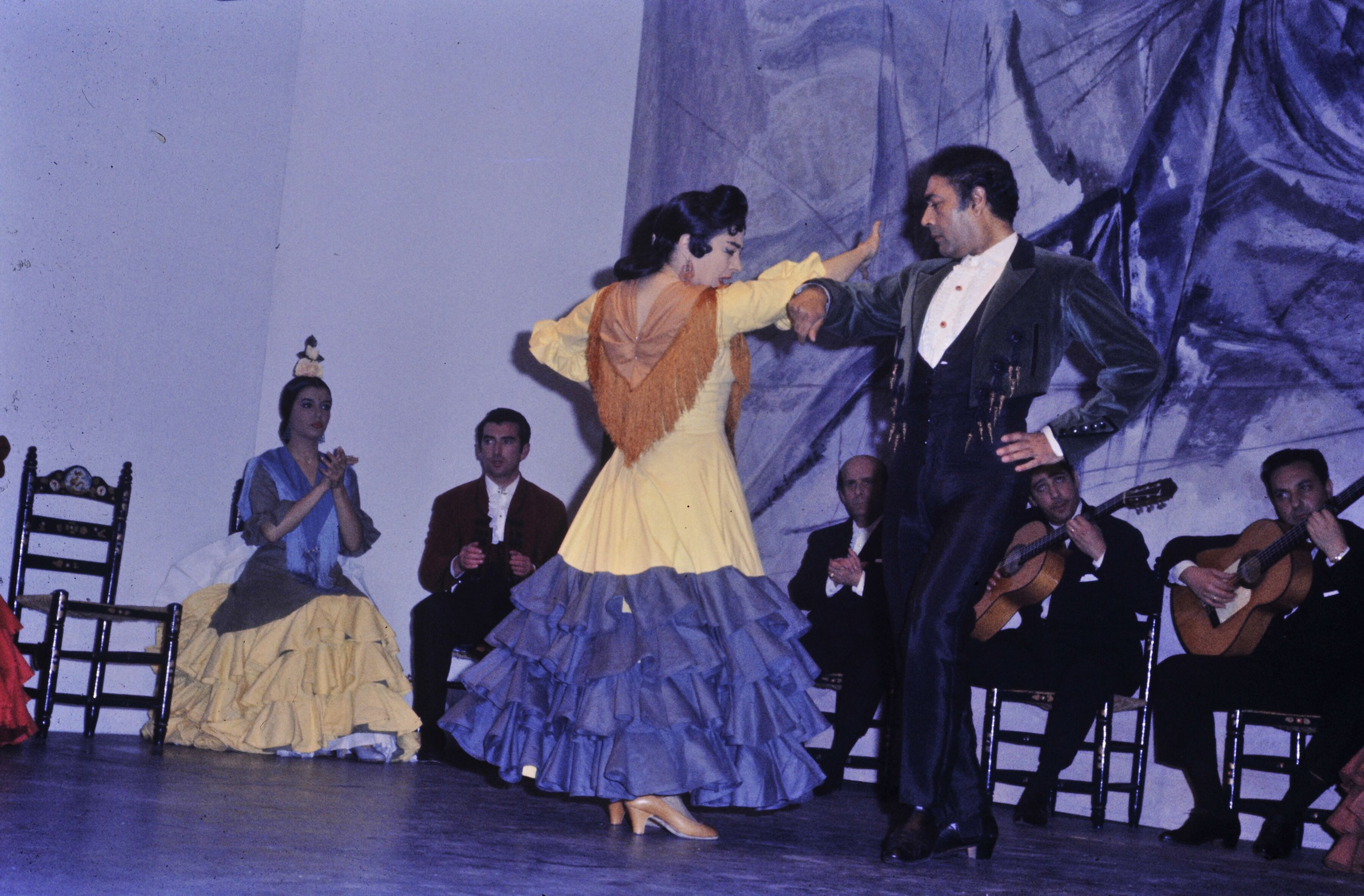
Two people performing zambra in Madrid

Zambra (Spanish pronunciation: [ˈθambɾa]) (from Andalusi Arabic zamra, originally from classical Arabic zamr) is a style of flamenco dance, typical of the Romani people of the provinces of Granada and Almería (Andalusia, Spain).

It is believed that the zambra is a continuation of earlier Morisco styles of dance. It became typical during wedding ceremonies, although nowadays it is particularly commonly danced for tourists in the caves of Sacromonte (Granada) and in the caves of Almería. In modern times, it has been espoused by flamenco dancers Carmen Amaya and Lola Flores. It is danced barefoot with finger cymbals; the blouse is tied under the bust and the skirt is very tight around the hips, then flares out and has a ruffle at the end.
