= Granaína =

Granaína (Spanish pronunciation: [ɡɾanaˈina]) is a flamenco style of singing and guitar playing from Granada. It is a variant of the Granada fandangos. It was originally danceable, but now has lost its rhythm, is much slower, and is usually only sung or played as a guitar solo, reflecting its Arab-Moorish heritage more strongly than other fandangos.

The famous singer Don Antonio Chacón (1869–1929) is attributed with freeing the granaína from its rhythmic ties and making it popular. Singers usually finish their rendering of the granaína with a media granaína, a similar tune but rising to a higher pitch. Manuel Vallejo (1891–1960) was a famous exponent of this latter cante.
