= Siguiriyas =

Style of flamenco music

Siguiriyas (Spanish pronunciation: [seɣiˈɾiʝas]; also seguiriyas, siguerillas, siguirillas, seguidilla gitana, etc.) are a form of flamenco music in the cante jondo category. This deep, expressive style is among the most important in flamenco. Unlike other palos of flamenco, siguiriyas stands out for being purely Romani (Calé) in origin. Siguiriyas are normally played in the key of A Phrygian with each measure (the compás) consisting of 12 counts with emphasis on the 1st, 3rd, 5th, 8th and 11th beats as shown here:

[1] 2 [3] 4 [5] 6 7 [8] 9 10 [11] 12

This rhythm can be contrasted with the rhythmic pattern of the soleares, which also has 12 beats, but the accents fall differently. Taking the unusual accenting into account, it can technically be seen as a measure of 3/4 (counted in eighth notes) starting on "2", then a measure of 6/8 followed by the "1 and" of the 3/4. Every note is evenly spaced apart. For example:

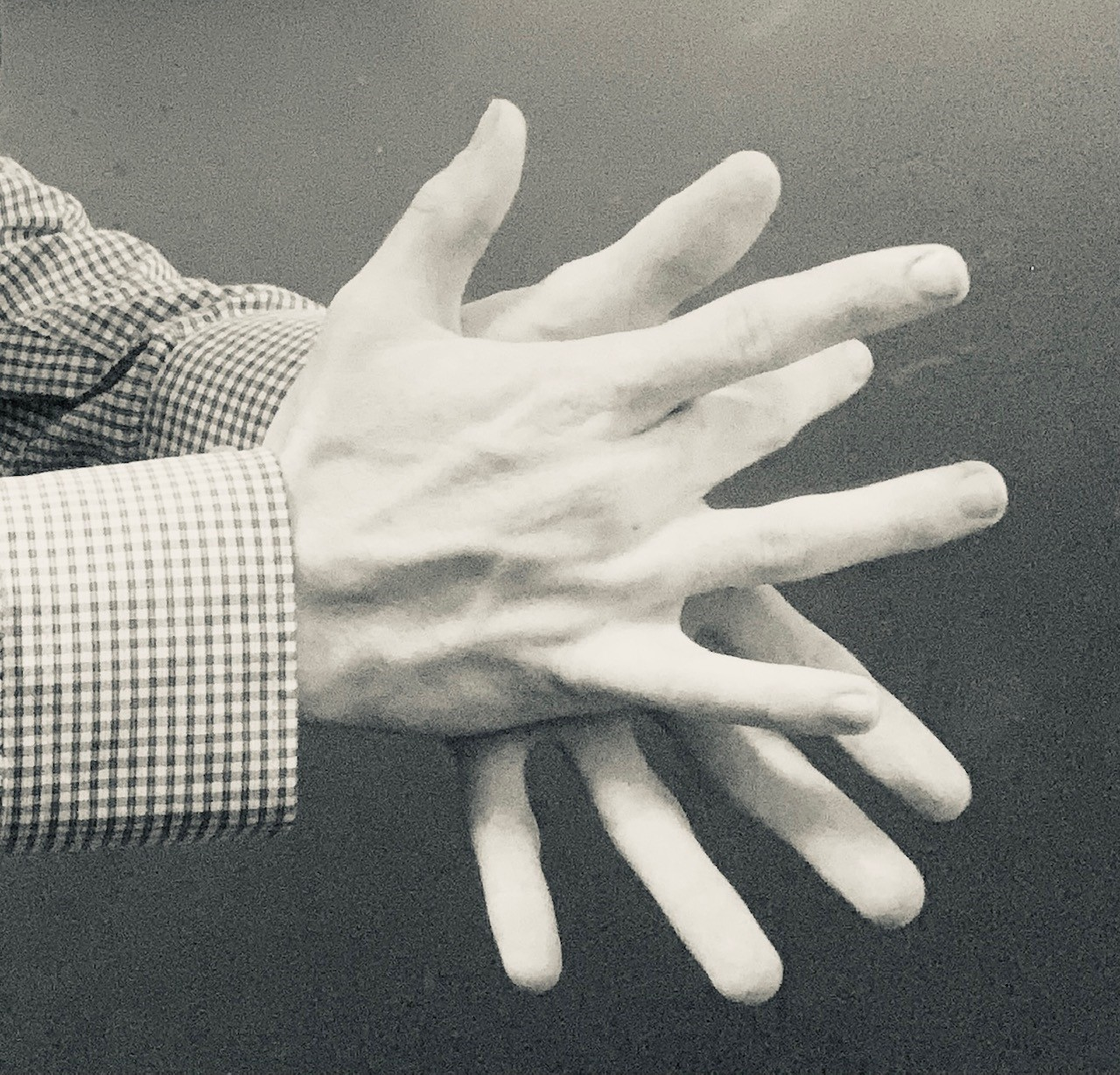
Palmas

[2] and [3] and [1] 2 3 [4] 5 6 [1] and

However, this presents difficulties in counting and is counted more simply in 5 beats, with three "short" and two "long" beats:

[1] and [2] and [3] and uh [4] and uh [5] and

In this case, the 1, 2, and 5 are the short beats and the 3 and 4 are long beats.

Siguiriyas are also often counted as a soleá started on 8, so the accents fall on:

[8] 9 [10] 11 [12] 1 2 [3] 4 5 [6] 7

Siguiriyas are often played with rubato which allow the singer to sing more expressively during a performance. During a performance, singers and dancers will increase and decrease the tempo for dramatic effect.

The compás often includes counter rhythms played by the guitar, palmas or the footwork of the dancers, creating interlocking rhythmic patterns.

== Cante and structure ==
The lyrics of siguiriyas deal with tragic themes such as imprisonment (e.g., Calabosito Oscuro sung by Juanito Valderrama) the death of a loved one and death in general (e.g., Si Acaso Muero sung by Camarón De La Isla), love, and religious ideas.

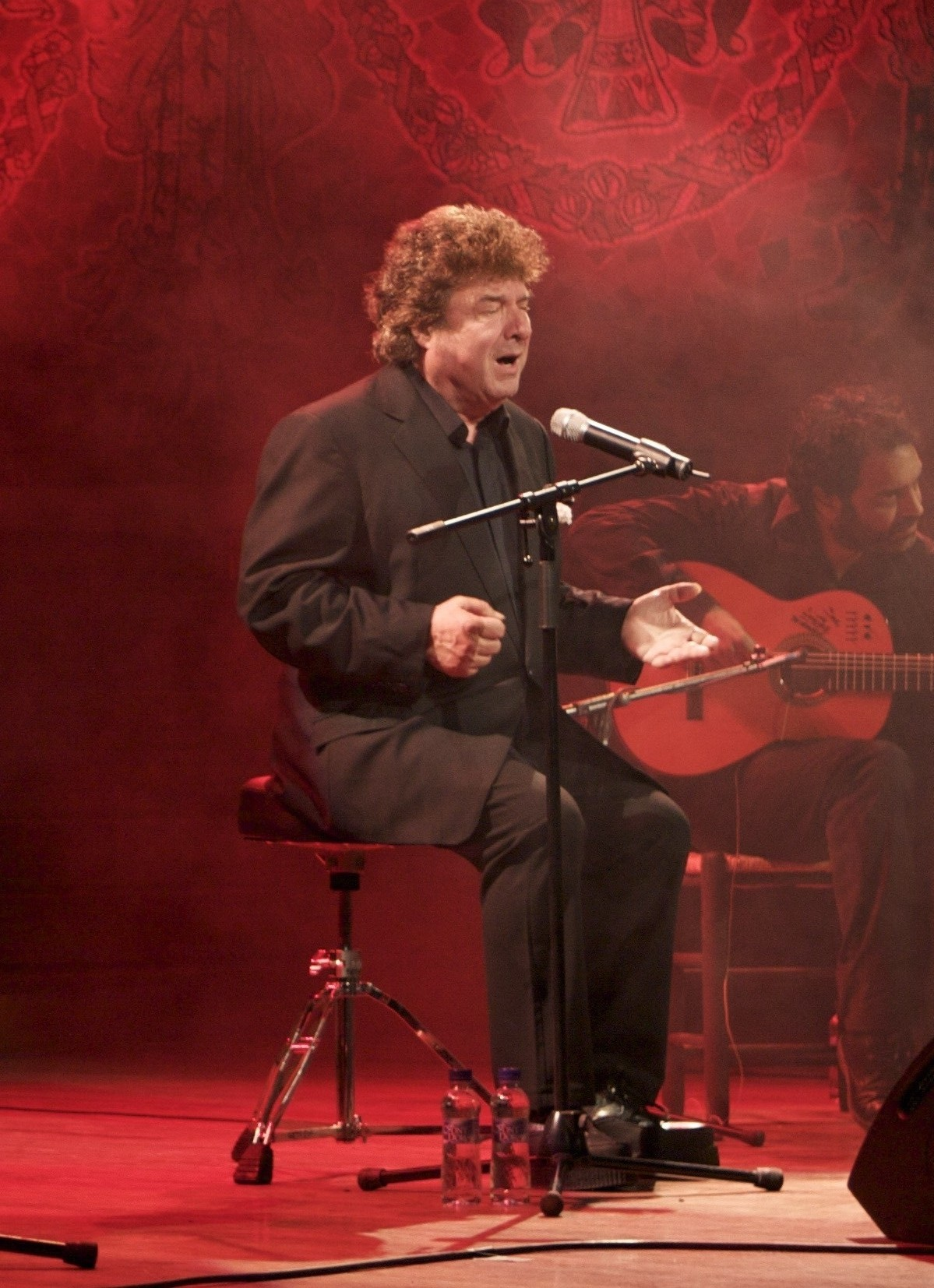
Enrique Morente, flamenco singer.

The oldest forms of siguiriyas were performed without musical accompaniment, akin to tonás. The more modern forms are accompanied by the guitar, where the nuances of the cante make it one of the most difficult styles to accompany and interpret.

Traditionally, the verses of siguiriyas are constructed of two short 6 syllable lines, followed by a longer 11 syllable line, then ending with another 6 syllable line, the rhythm being provided by the syllables of the words.

An example of this is a verse which has been attributed to Tomas El Nitri:

Por aquella Ventana que al campo salía le daba voces a la mare de mi alma y no me respondía	Through that window Looking out onto the fields I called out for the mother of my soul And she did not answer me

This structure is not always strictly adhered to and in practice siguiriyas can be sung in many different syllable counts. This is due to the emotional intensity of siguiriyas where feeling can prevail over form. For this reason, it is not uncommon to find siguiriyas with other metrics, such as 7-7-11-7 and 8-5-11-6. A less widespread form is the 6-11-6 structure, in which the first verse rhymes with the third, and the second is usually repeated when singing.

There are different kinds of siguiriyas associated with the style of a particular singer, each presenting its stylistic variants more or less marked by the personality of the interpreter. For example, in Cádiz the cante por siguiriya from El Planeta is simple and lacks ornamentation; in Triana, that of Frasco el Colorao is very ornate.

In a majority of siguiriyas “Ay” is typically sung to introduce and emphasize the lyrics and is sung as a melisma across many syllables.

== Dance ==
The dance for siguiriyas was first introduced by Vicente Escudero in 1940. The dance is solemn and ceremonious, involving an introduction performed by guitar and singer, followed by an entrada, letra (dictated by the singer), escobilla, 2nd letra, a danced falseta and final escobilla performed by the dancer.
