= List of flamenco guitarists =

List of notable flamenco guitarists:

== A ==
- Ramón de Algeciras
- Vicente Amigo
- Aniya la Gitana
- Juan d'Anyelica
- Gino D'Auri

== B ==
Miguel de la Bastide

- Tonino Baliardo
- Miguel de la Bastide
- Andrés Batista

== C ==
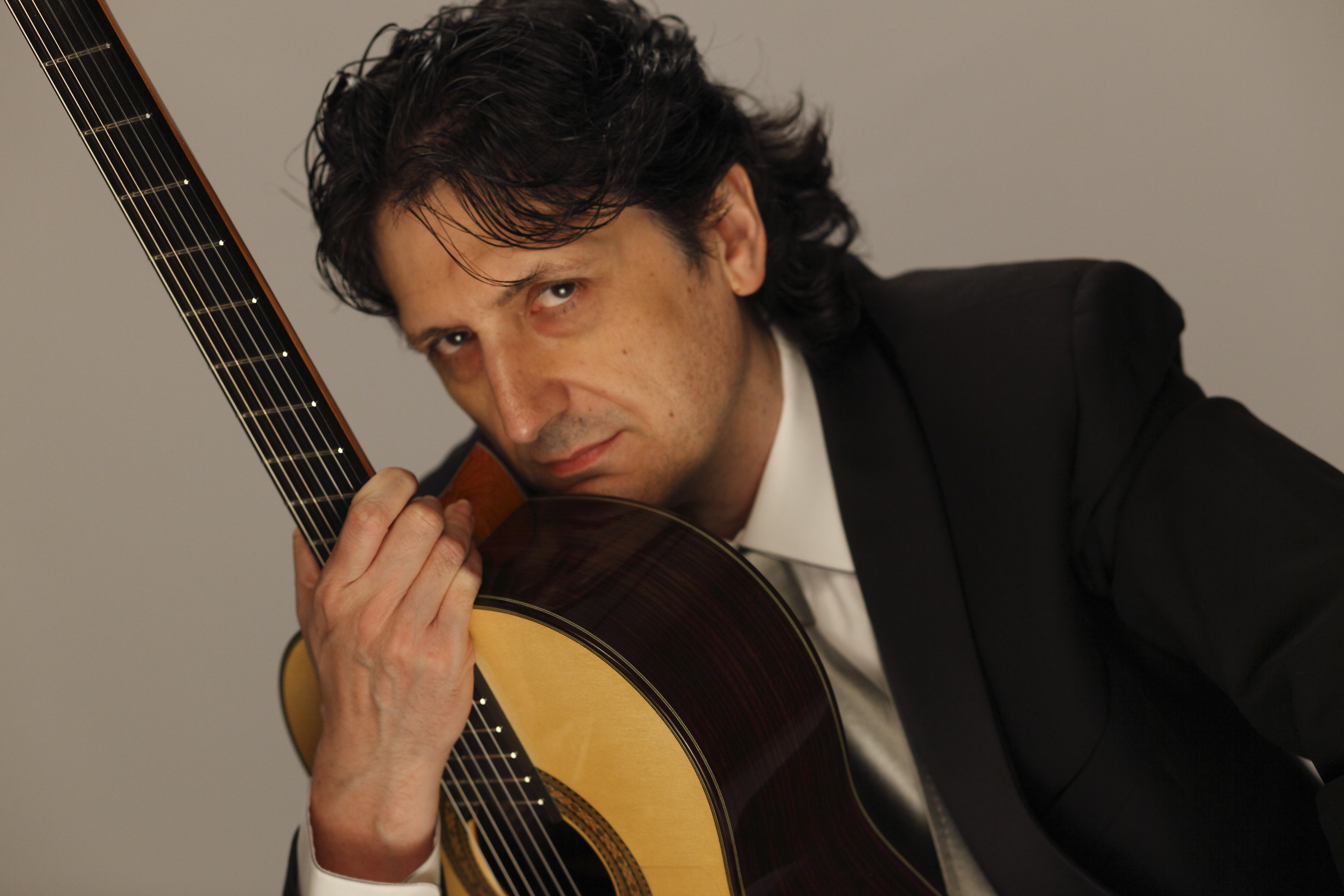
Juan Manuel Cañizares

- Juan Manuel Cañizares
- Agustín Carbonell
- Paco Cepero
- Chuscales
- Charo (María de Rasten)
- Moraíto Chico II
- Jesse Cook
- Juan Raphael Cortés
- Manuel Cano Tamayo

== D ==
- Gino D'Auri
- Diego del Gastor

== E ==
- El Viejín (José Jiménez)
- El Yoni (Jonathan Arenas)
- Mario Escudero

== F ==
- Eddie Freeman

== G ==
- Ricardo Garcia
- Diego del Gastor
- Feliu Gasull
- Juan Gómez "Chicuelo"
- Pedro Javier González
- Grisha Goryachev

== H ==
- Pepe Habichuela
- Juan Habichuela (Juan Carmona)
- Amir-John Haddad
- Oscar Herrero

== J ==
- Antonia Jiménez
- Niño Josele

== K ==
- Robby Krieger
- Andrei Krylov

== L ==
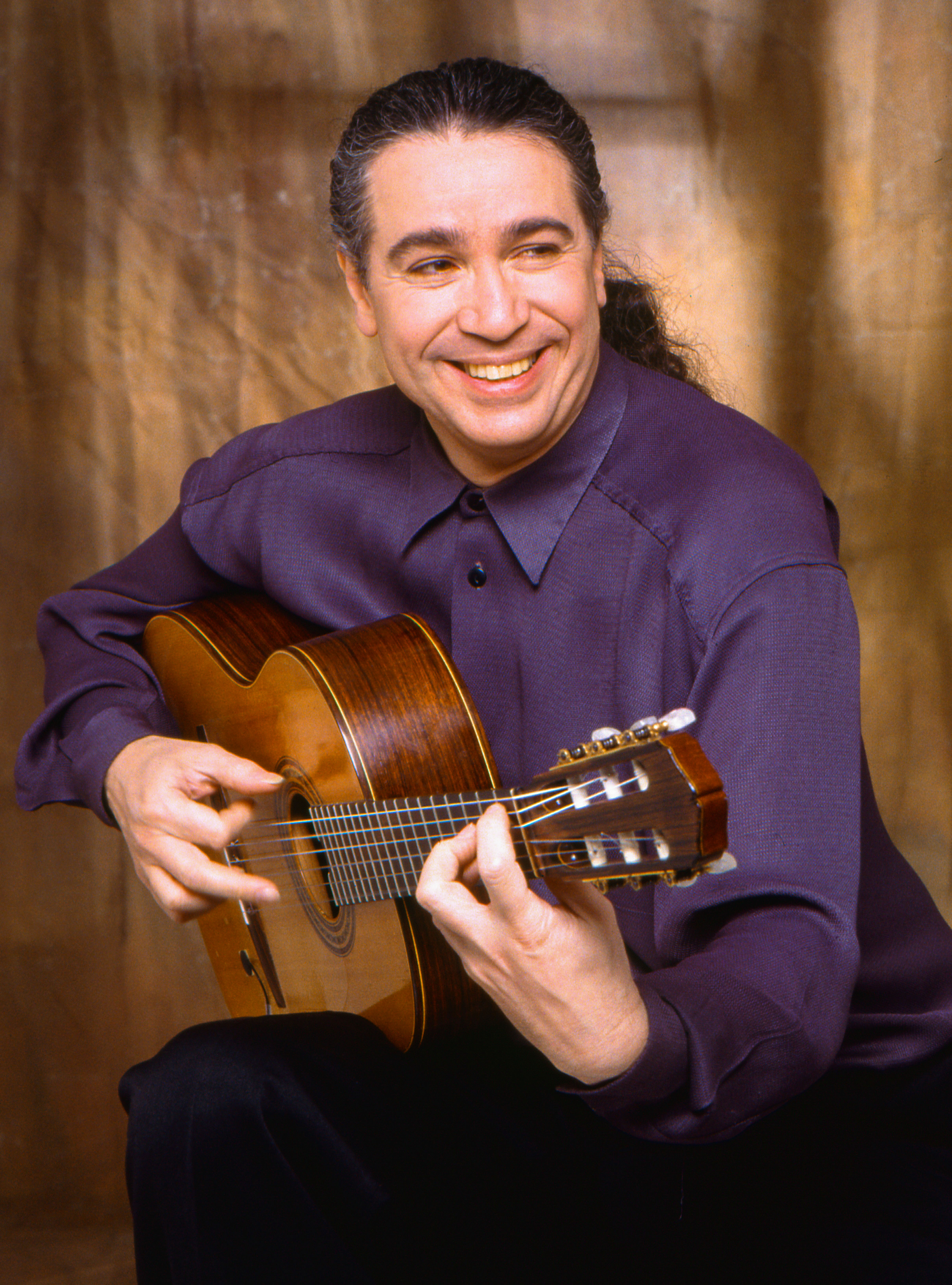
Canadian Michael Laucke in 2011

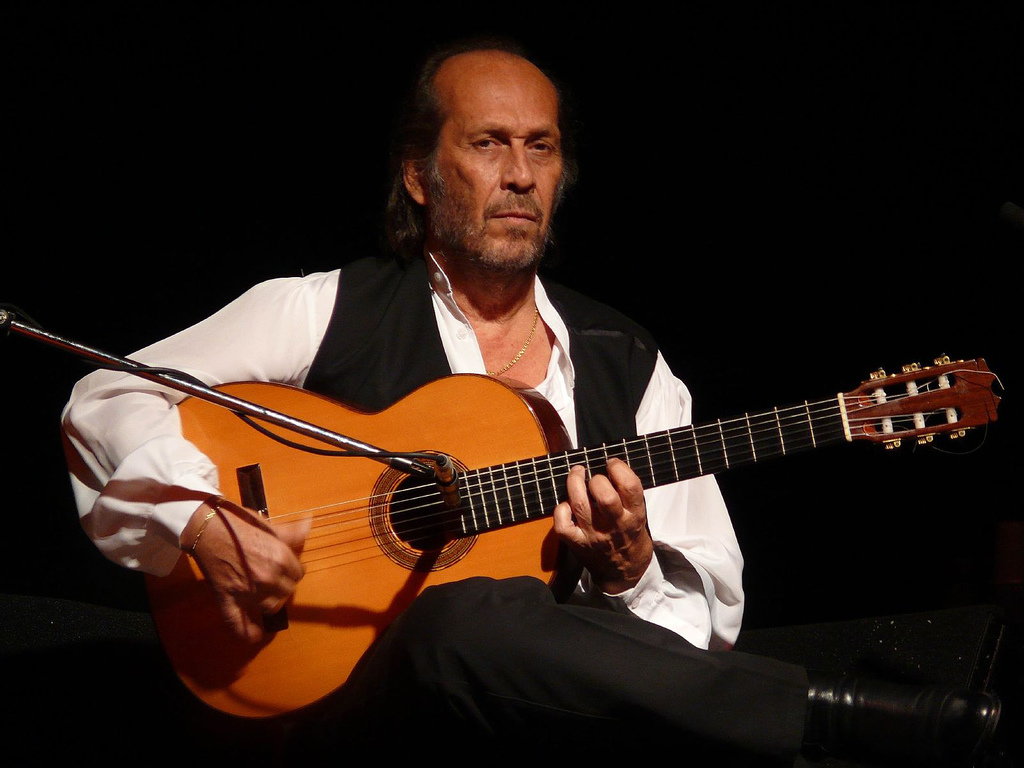
Paco de Lucía

- Michael Laucke
- Javier Limón
- Paco de Lucena
- Ottmar Liebert
- Thomas Lorenzo
- Paco de Lucía

== M ==
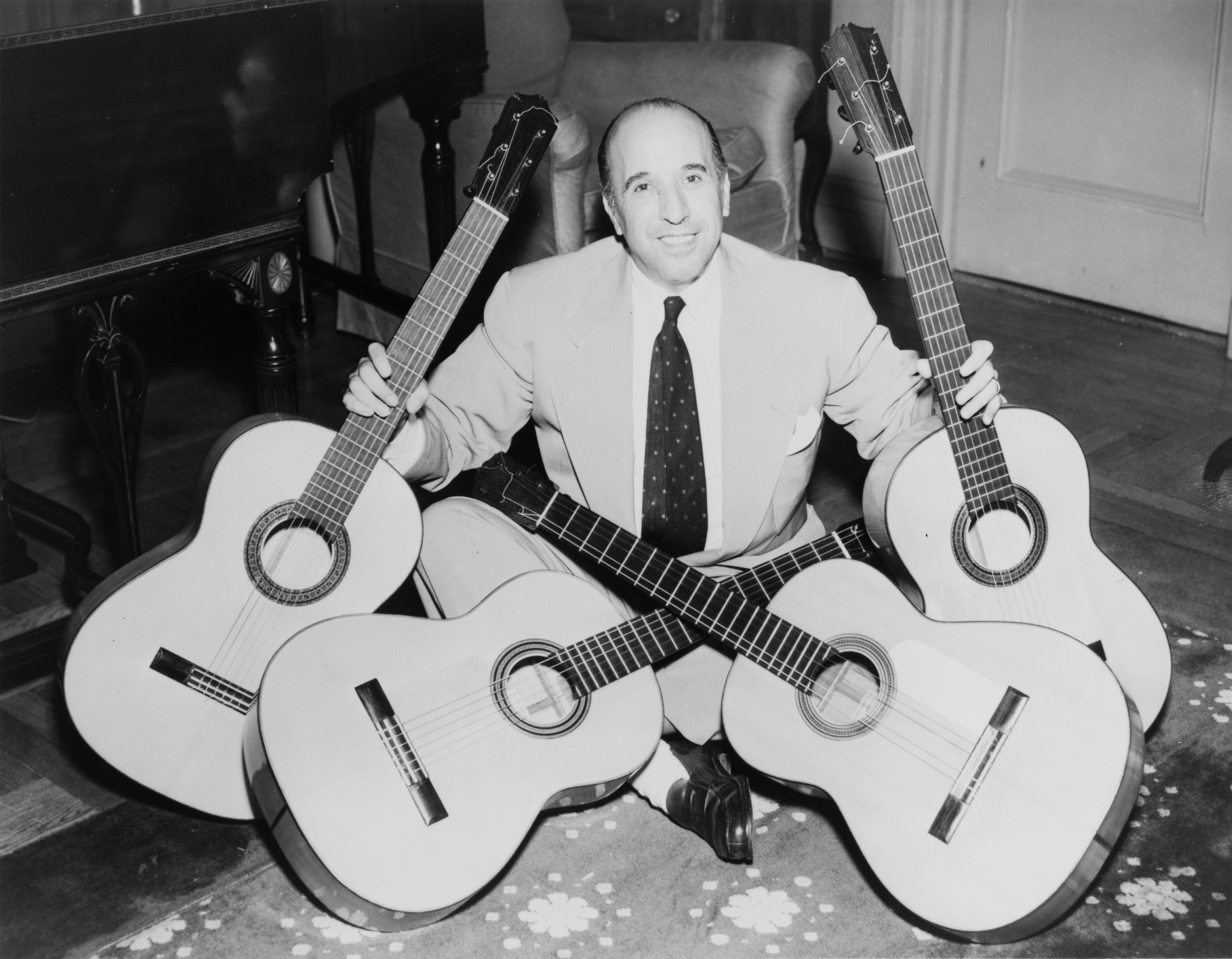
Carlos Montoya

- Luis Maravilla
- Melchor de Marchena
- Juan Martín
- Pepe Martínez
- Robert Michaels
- Ricardo Modrego
- Carlos Montoya
- Ramón Montoya
- Diego Del Morao
- Fred Mulders
- Adam del Monte

== P ==
- Paco Peña
- Manitas de Plata (Ricardo Baliardo)
- Donn Pohren

== R ==
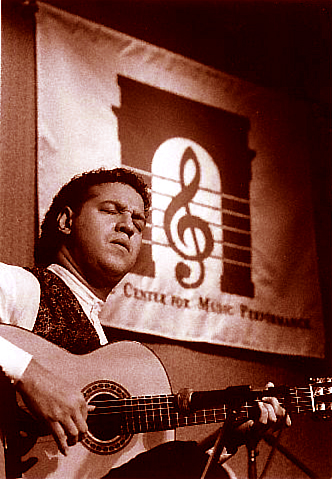
Val Ramos

- Ronald Radford
- Antonio Rey
- Niño Ricardo
- Rafael Riqueni
- Flavio Rodrigues
- José Antonio Rodríguez
- Lawson Rollins
- Pepe Romero
- Mohamed Rouane
- Javier Ruibal

== S ==
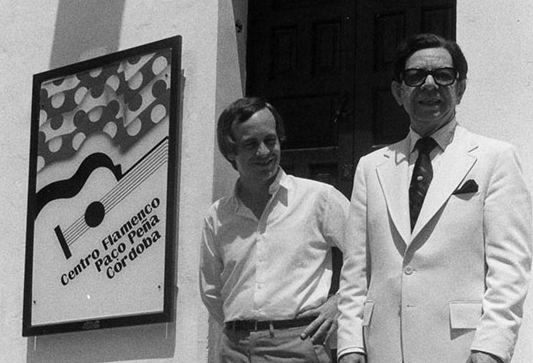
Paco Peña and Sabicas

- Sabicas (Agustín Castellón Campos)
- Esteban de Sanlúcar
- Manolo Sanlúcar
- Roger Scannura
- Juan Serrano
- Paco Serrano
- Marta Soto
- Edward Stephenson

== T ==
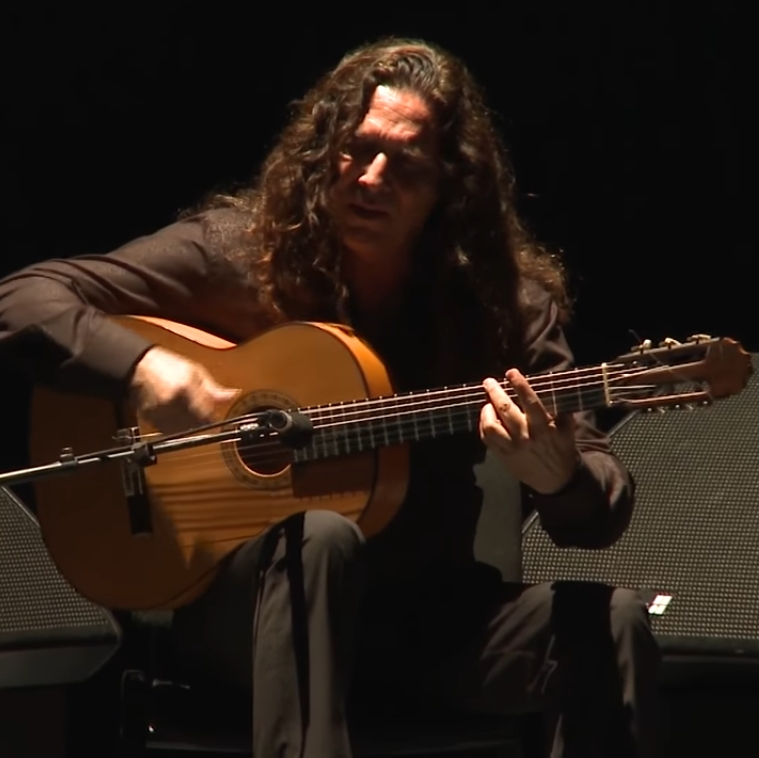
Tomatito

- Teye (Teije Wijnterp)
- Tomatito (José Fernández Torres)

== Y ==
- Narciso Yepes

== See also ==
- List of classical guitarists
