= Detlev Bork =

German guitarist (born 1967)

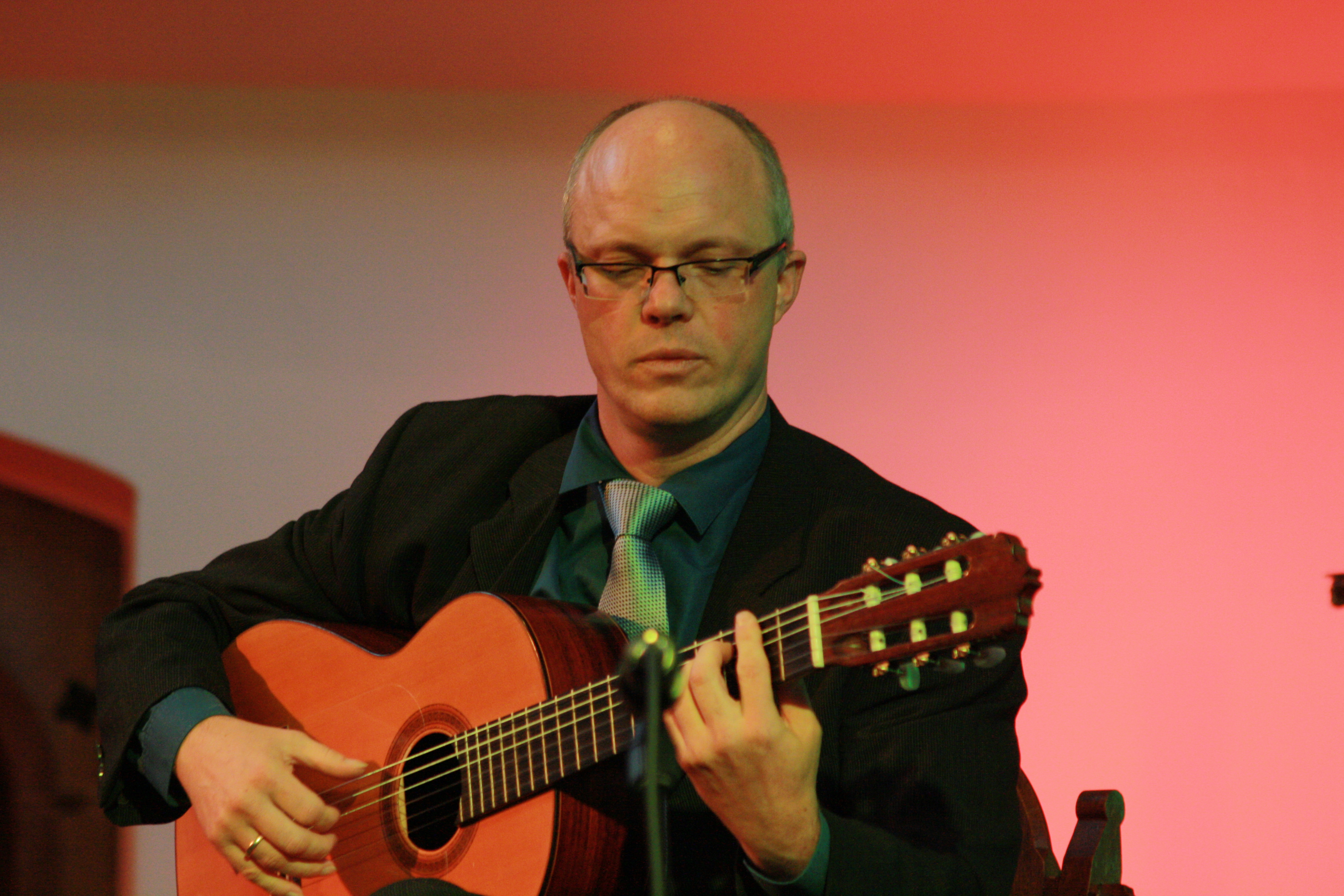
Detlev Bork

Detlev Bork (born 9 April 1967) is a German guitarist specializing in both classical and flamenco music. With his large collection of historical scores and recordings, he has contributed to musicological projects researching classical guitar music.

== Life and career ==
The grandson of a concert pianist, Bork was born in Kiel where he became a member of the Kieler Knabenchor, a boys choir with which he went on international concert tours. He learned the guitar from age 11 and studied at the Musikhochschule Köln (Aachen campus) with Tadashi Sasaki (1988–93) and operatic singing with Margarethe van den Eynden and Klaus Jürgen Küper. During 1992–3 he also studied the guitar in London with Carlos Bonell. He took part in master classes with Abel Carlevaro, Eduardo Fernández, Alberto Ponce, José Tomás, Luise Walker, and others. Further studies during the 1990s took him to Spain, extending his knowledge of the flamenco style with Andrés Batista, Félix de Utrera, Luis Maravilla and José Luis Postigo. During this time he also worked with dancers including Lelita de Cadiz, Antonio Romero and José de la Vega.

He has performed as soloist, chamber musician and with orchestra throughout Europe, Israel, US, Canada, and Mexico, and adjudicated at international guitar competitions. His CD The Other Spanish Guitar was elected ‘Classical Recording of the Month’ in March 2000 (Diamond Multimedia, CA, USA). Bork's strong interest in contemporary music has led to a number of commissions from living composers which he first performed (see below).

Bork lives and works in Heidelberg, Germany. Apart from his artistic and pedagogical work, he is also active as a musicologist. He has been a contributor to journals such as "Stereoplay", "Classical Guitar" or "Ensemble". With almost 8,000 items, he owns one of the largest private collections of recorded classical guitar music in the world and is consulted regularly by various international archives and institutions. He has contributed, with Jörg Jewanski, to numerous biographies of guitarists in the German encyclopedia Die Musik in Geschichte und Gegenwart (MGG) (Kassel: Bärenreiter, 1996–2008). Bork has contributed research papers to guitar symposiums and festivals including the Lake Konstanz Guitar Research Meeting, the El Paso String Series, etc. Since 2013, he is a guest lecturer at Pepperdine University, Malibu.

== Compositions written for Detlev Bork ==
Recent works written for Detlev Bork include:

- Jan Martin Lang: Take Ten (2000)
- Andrés Batista: Generalife y Tartaneras (2004)
- Jens Joneleit: Spur (2008)
- Roland Chadwick: Variations on a Theme of Benjamin Britten (2013)
- Vincent Lindsey-Clark: Centenary Overture (2013)
- Jaume Torrent: Hommage an Benjamin Britten (2013)
- Frank Wallace: A Heavy Sleep (2013)
- Siegfried Steinkogler: Sea Fantasy (2014)
- Sergio Blardony: Todo proximo y intocable (2015)
- Jorge Fernández Guerra: Kedem (2015)
- José María Gallardo Del Rey: Feria de Abril (2015)

== Recordings ==
- Cuerpo y Luz (MAX 894, 1994; re-issued 2014), with flamenco compositions by Detlev Bork
- The Other Spanish Guitar (Innovative Strings Records 0300, 2000; re-issued 2015). Works by José Brocá (1805–1882), Juan Parga (1843–1899), Daniel Fortea (1878–1953), Joaquín Nin-Culmell (1908–2004), Jaume Torrent (born 1953)
- Reflejos (Signum SIG-X 128-00, 2005)
- Contemporary Guitar Music from Iceland (no label, 2006)
- Between Classical and Flamenco (Christophorus CHE 0145–2, 2009). Works by José Viñas (1823–1888), Luis Soria (1851–1935), Daniel Fortea, Joaquín Turina (1882–1949), Pedro Sanjuán (1886–1976), Regino Sainz de la Maza (1896–1981), Andrés Batista (born 1937).
- Música contemporània espanyola per a guitarra / Spanish Contemporary Music for Guitar (La Mà de Guido LMG 2146, 2016). Works by José María Gallardo Del Rey (born 1961), Jaume Torrent (born 1953), Andrés Batista (born 1937), Jorge Fernández Guerra (born 1952), Agustín Castilla-Ávila (born 1974).
- Roland Chadwick: The Beast of Many Colours (NEOS 11916, 2019). Works by Roland Chadwick (born 1957): The Study of pi; Variations on a Theme of Benjamin Britten; Partita No. 2; The Beast of Many Colours; Partita No. 1; Four Abbreviations; Aigburth Variations.

== Musicological publications ==
- "Die Gitarre in der Ära der Schellackplatte", in: Ansorge, Peter & Richter, Helmut (eds.): Die klassische Gitarre im 20. Jahrhundert. Beiträge zu ihrer Entwicklung im deutschsprachigen Raum (Oberhausen: European Guitar Teachers Association Deutschland e.V., 2010), pp. 81–110
- contributions about guitar composers in Die Musik in Geschichte und Gegenwart (MGG) (Kassel: Bärenreiter, 1996–2008)
- discography at Austrian Guitar Archive

== Bibliography ==
- Thérèse Wassily Saba: "Young Guitarists Series", in: Classical Guitar vol. 20, no 7 (March 2002), pp. 24–26
- "'Es gab so viele gute Spieler vor dem Zweiten Weltkrieg, aber alle reden nur von Segovia und Llobet'", in: Gitarre Aktuell no. 89 (II/2005), pp. 52–55
- "Die rechte Hand des Gitarristen", in: ¡Anda! no. 65 (April–May 2006), p. 15
- "Britten in Mind", in: Gitarre Aktuell no. 123 (IV/2013), pp. 12–14
