= Carlos Bonell =

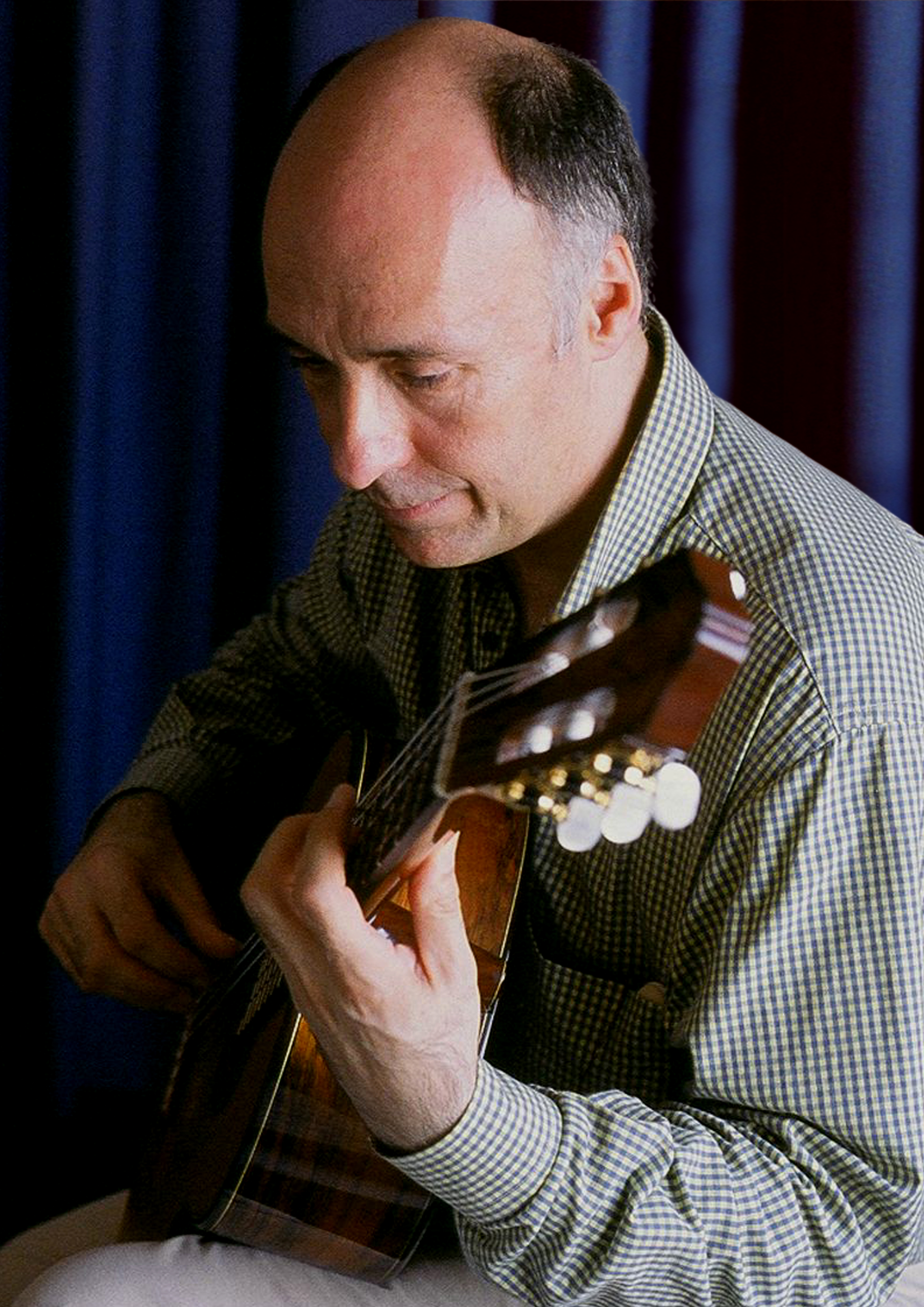
- Carlos Bonell, Spain 2004 (Photo by Roy Stedall-Humphry)

Background information
- Born: 23 July 1949; London, England
- Genres: Classical, instrumental music
- Occupations: Guitarist, arranger, teacher
- Instrument: Guitar
- Years active: 1972–present
- Labels: Decca, EMI, Bonell/Young
- Website: http://www.carlosbonell.com

Carlos Antonio Bonell (born 23 July 1949) is an English classical guitarist of Spanish origin. He has been described by Classical Guitar magazine as "one of the great communicators of the guitar world".

== Career ==
Born in London, Bonell started to play at the age of five, learning to play Spanish folk music on the guitar from his father who was a keen amateur guitarist, while also studying the violin more formally at school. He continued his studies at the Royal College of Music with John Williams, where upon completing his studies in 1972, he was appointed professor.

In 1973, he won the Greater London Arts Association Young Musicians' Scheme award and as a consequence gave more than fifty concerts in the south-east of England between 1973 and 1974. His concerto debut in 1975 was with the Royal Philharmonic Orchestra conducted by Rafael Frühbeck de Burgos at the Royal Festival Hall, London in a performance of the Concierto de Aranjuez by Joaquín Rodrigo. His first solo LP recording, for the Enigma Classics label, recorded in 1975, was "Guitar Music of Spain". The following year he recorded a Grammy nominated album with John Williams and friends for CBS with the instrumentation of two guitars, marimba, xylophone and double bass. The group performed throughout the UK for several years.

His first performance in New York in 1978 was at the Mostly Mozart Festival in the Avery Fisher Hall. The New York Times wrote of his performance: "Carlos Bonell is a player of superb poetic gifts".

== Concierto de Aranjuez ==
In 1981, Bonell made the first of three recordings of Joaquín Rodrigo's Concierto de Aranjuez. Recorded in Canada with the Montreal Symphony Orchestra and Charles Dutoit for the Decca label, it was one of the first digital recordings of the concerto and was described as "a magnificent triumph" by Classical Music magazine. It was awarded a "Rosette" by the Penguin CD Guide and has been frequently singled out as the finest interpretations available.

During 1986, he played Rodrigo's Concierto de Aranjuez five times in London's Royal Festival Hall, with The Royal Philharmonic, The London Symphony Orchestra, The London Philharmonic Orchestra and English Chamber Orchestra.

== Tours and recordings ==
Between 1987 and 1995, he recorded seven albums ranging from music for solo guitar to concertos with the English Chamber and Royal Philharmonic Orchestras. During the 1980s, Carlos Bonell formed an ensemble of three guitars, flute and percussion. It played in more than 20 countries including Australia, Hong Kong, and much of Europe.

In 1995, he gave a benefit concert at London's Wigmore Hall with John Williams to raise awareness of the plight of children caught in acts of war around the world. All proceeds were donated to the organisation War Child. Other artists with whom Bonell has recorded and appeared in concert include guitarists Paco Peña and Martin Taylor, violinists Pinchas Zukerman and Salvatore Accardo, and singers Patricia Rozario, Teresa Berganza and the late Philip Langridge.

He has played at international festivals including The City of London, Aldeburgh, Helsinki, Israel, Tanglewood, Sydney, Istanbul, Hong Kong. In 1997, he visited Australia for the first time, returning several years later in a nationwide tour including all the major cities. After his first visit to Latin America in 2000 he returned every year until 2007 to play with Venezuelan orchestras associated with El Sistema, working closely with some of the younger players prior to performances.

In 2004, Carlos Bonell recorded his first DVD. Classical Guitar Performance includes music ranging from Bach to Albeniz. The same year saw his first book about the guitar: Guitar. An Easy Guide

In 2006, Bonell undertook a tour of the US, which included Fort Worth, Dallas, Atlanta and Las Vegas, presenting his solo programme "Millennium Guitar, the first 1000 years", which included music from Hildegard von Bingen to works by contemporary composers.

His career also includes recordings for television and film. He has recorded sound tracks for the Hollywood films City of Angels and The Honest Courtesan and for the BBC TV productions of Inspector Morse and The Politician's Wife.

In 2010, he returned to Japan and the United States for more tours.

== London International Guitar Festival ==
In 2004, he directed the Latin Quarter Guitar Festival in London in honour of Greg Smallman, the Australian guitar maker, who visited and lectured in England and Spain for the first time. 2005 saw the first London International Guitar Festival, of which he was founder and artistic director. The festival presented events in five major concert venues. It included an 80th birthday tribute to Venezuelan guitarist Alirio Díaz. Performing artists included Alirio Díaz, John Williams (with whom Bonell played duets), Pavel Steidl in his London debut, Elisa Perez-Saponi, Patricia Rozario and others. The festival had two further editions under Carlos Bonell's direction in 2007 and 2008.

In 2010, he devised and inaugurated the Transformations Music Series, presenting guitar-related concerts at London's Bolivar Hall.

== Queen and The Beatles ==
In 2008, he recorded the album Queen Guitar Rhapsodies of new arrangements of music by the group Queen for solo guitar and symphony orchestra. His arrangement for solo guitar of "Love of my Life" was praised by Queen's Brian May.

From 2006, he has been helping with the recording of a concerto for classical guitar and orchestra composed by Sir Paul McCartney. The work was featured in a June 2007 cover article by The New Yorker magazine. His CD album Magical Mystery Guitar Tour, released in 2012, is dedicated to the music of the Beatles in his own arrangements for solo guitar. It went to number one on the UK iTunes Classical charts, and a track from the album reached number four in the Singles' charts.

== Teaching ==
Carlos Bonell conducts international teaching courses in Italy, Spain, the UK and Mexico. He is Senior Professor at London's Royal College of Music, London; Professor Invitado at the University of Guanajuato in Mexico; and directs the Cátedra Internacional de Guitarra Carlos Bonell in Venezuela. His pupils include Alan Banks, Detlev Bork, Nils Klöfver, Jakob Lindberg, Nigel North, Brad Richter, and numerous others.

In 2007, he was awarded the Spanish prize "Premio Trujamán" for his work for the solo guitar.

== Discography ==
- John Williams and Friends: CBS 73487 (LP, 1976); MK 35108 (CD, 1990)
- Guitar Music of Spain: Enigma Classics (1976)
- Guitar Music of the Baroque: Enigma Classics (1977)
- Showpieces: Decca SXL6950 (1981)
- Rodrigo: Concierto de Aranjuez + Fantasía para un Gentilhombre, with Montreal Symphony Orchestra conducted by Charles Dutoit: Decca LP SXDL7525 / CD 4482432 (1981)
- Paganini Trios and Quartets, with Salvatore Accardo (violin and viola), Sylvie Gazeau (violin), Alfonso Ghedin (viola), Rocco Filippini (cello): FonitCetra ITL 70091 (1982)
- Twentieth Century Music for Guitar: EMI CDC 7495122 (1987)
- Rodrigo: Concierto de Aranjuez + Fantasía para un Gentilhombre, with English Chamber Orchestra conducted by Steuart Bedford: Collins Classics 10322 (1989)
- Fandango: ASV Records CD QS 6038 (1990)
- Once Upon a Time in the West, with Xer-Wai (violin): Elite Music EL 5027 (1993)
- William Walton: Anon in Love: Chandos Records CHAN 9292 (1994)
- Rodrigo: Concierto de Aranjuez + Fantasía para un Gentilhombre, with Royal Philharmonic Orchestra conducted by Jacek Kaspszyk: Tring TRP 050 (1994)
- Benjamin Britten. The Folk Songs: Collins Classics 70392 (1995)
- The Sea in Spring, with ensemble: Upbeat Classics URCD 128 (1997)
- The Passion of Morse: Tring 003 (1997)
- The Private Collection: Upbeat Classics URCD 145 (1998)
- Kinkachoo, I love you (Millennium Guitar, the First 1000 Years): Rainbow Classics 993010 (1999)
- Song of the Sea: Spearhead Music SM 100 (2004)
- Classical Guitar Performance: Young/Bonell Production (2005)
- Queen Guitar Rhapsodies: Young/Bonell Production (2008)
- Saints and Fireworks: Spearhead Music SM 200 (2010)
- Magical Mystery Guitar Tour: Young/Bonell Production (2012)

== Film and television ==
- City of Angels
- The Honest Courtesan (released as "Dangerous Beauty" in the US)
- Inspector Morse
- ''The Politician's Wife''

== Publications ==
- Spanish Folk Songs and Dances, Ariel Publications, 1975
- Gaspar Sanz: Airs and Dances, Ariel Publications, 1977
- A Tarrega Collection, Ariel Publications, 1980
- First Pieces for Solo Guitar, Ricordi, 1983
- The Romantic Collection, International Music Publishers, 1983
- The Classical Collection, International Music Publishers, 1983
- Spanish Folk Songs for 3 Guitars, Schott Music, 1984
- Purcell: 3 Pieces, Schott Music, 1984
- Tárrega: Fantasia, Schott Music, 1984
- Technique Builder, Cambridge Music Works, 1998
- Guitar. An Easy Guide, New Holland Publishers Ltd., 2005, ISBN 978-1843303343
- Essential Classics for Guitar, Bonell/Young Publications, 2007
