= Tadashi Sasaki =

Tadashi Sasaki may refer to:

- Tadashi Sasaki (banker) (1907–1988)
- Tadashi Sasaki (engineer) (1915–2018)
- Tadashi Sasaki (musician) (born 1943)
