= Christine Jowers =

American dancer, producer and dance critic

Christine Jowers (born July 30 in Albuquerque, New Mexico) is an American dancer, teacher, producer, and dance critic. She is the founder and editor-in-chief of the leading online dance magazine, The Dance Enthusiast. She is known for her work as an advocate for dance and audience engagement through writing.

== Life and career ==
Jowers was raised in Saint Thomas, U.S. Virgin Islands by her parents Dolores Veronica and John M. Jowers. As the daughter of a museum curator at Fort Christian and the executive director of Virgin Islands Council on the Arts, she was exposed from an early age to a wide range of local and international artists. Through his work with VICA, her father collaborated with the National Endowment for the Arts, National Assembly of State Arts Agencies, and UNESCO to create cultural art expositions and concert performances that toured throughout the Caribbean. Educated as a dancer at St. Thomas School of Dance and Ballet Theatre of the Virgin Islands, upon graduating from Sts. Peter & Paul School, Jowers was inspired by her father to study at Sarah Lawrence College and Goucher College from which she graduated with a degree in Dance History/Criticism and Communications.

After performing as principal dancer with Doris Humphrey Repertory Company, Jowers created Moving Arts Projects in 1997 to present her work as a soloist. During this period she performed to great acclaim across the United States and Europe and collaborated on projects with numerous renowned artists including Margie Gillis, Ann Carlson, Janis Brenner, Larry Keigwin, Kun Yang Lin, Catherine Gallant, and the future artistic director of Martha Graham Dance Company, Janet Eilber. Shifting her focus from performing, Jowers began teaching as a guest artist at the Jose Limón Institute, Laban Centre for Movement and Dance, Danceworks (UK), Islington Arts Factory, Liverpool Institute for Performing Arts, University of Roehampton, Goucher College, and Kean College while also contributing writing to Dance/USA, The Hopkins Review, and The Huffington Post.

In 2007 she founded the Dance Enthusiast to set off "an exuberant revolution in dance communication". Responding to the diminishing presence of dance coverage in the news, Jowers grew and expanded a team of writers out of her home to revitalize the dance field through numerous opportunities offered by operating online, including video coverage and innovative audience engagement platforms that allowed concert attendees to publish their own reflections and reviews. Recently, Jowers launched a highly acclaimed concert series called "Enthusiastic Events" that allows artists to perform and speak with the audience about the artform directly. Acclaimed artists who have participated in these events include the Martha Graham Dance Company, the Broadway choreographer Chet Walker, the director of the Museum at Fashion Institute of Technology Valerie Steele, the flamenco guitarist El Bola, and the Litefeet master Chrybaby Cozie.

To date, the Dance Enthusiast remains a leading outlet for dance journalism, interviews, and artistic advocacy in NYC.

== Personal life ==
Jowers' family is West Indian from Saint Thomas, Puerto Rico, Nevis, and Saint Maarten. She is married to Robert Friedman, with whom she has two sons and a cat. The family lives in New York City.

She is a member of the Dance/USA and serves on the Editorial Board of The Hopkins Review as an Advisory Editor.
