= Agustín Carbonell =

- Also known as: "El Bola"
- Born: Agustín Carbonell Serrano; 1967 (age 58–59); Madrid, Spain
- Genres: Flamenco; jazz flamenco
- Occupation: Flamenco guitarist
- Website: Official website

Agustin "El Bola" Carbonell (born Agustín Carbonell Serrano; Madrid, 1967) is a guitarist and Spanish composer of flamenco and new flamenco music.

Member of a family with wide flamenco roots, including names like Sabicas, El Bola and Paco de Lucía, he began playing at 13 years of age in various "tablaos" (flamenco gatherings) in his hometown. He soon participated in shows like Cumbre Flamenca (Flamenco Summit), which premiered on Broadway and in Hollywood. In the late 1980s, he created his own group, joining the new flamenco and jazz flamenco styles. He recorded his first album Bola on Nuba Records in 1989. He has since collaborated with the Paco de Lucia group, recording three albums with him. He also recorded three albums with the singer Enrique Morente. and with other musicians such as Ramón el Portugués, Jorge Pardo, Chano Dominguez, Carles Benavent, Rubem Dantas, Javier Colina, among others.

In 1996, he recorded his second album, Vuelo Flamenco (Flamenco Flight), and moved to Brazil, where he lived for eight years. On his return he recorded a third disc, Desvaríos with Jorge Pardo (RTV Music, 2007).
