= Ronald Radford (guitarist) =

American guitarist

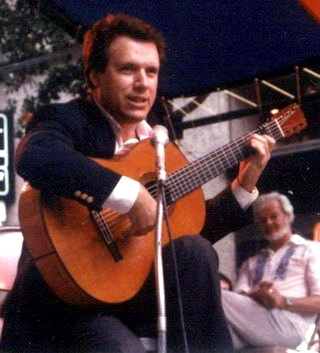
Ronald Radford at Mayfest in Tulsa, Oklahoma (circa 1993)

Ronald Radford is an American Flamenco guitar player. Born in California, he currently resides in the St. Louis, Missouri area. Radford is a protégé of Carlos Montoya, and studied classical guitar with Andrés Segovia. He is the only person awarded a Fulbright Scholarship to study Flamenco in Spain, where he lived and traveled.

His performances have spanned four continents, as well as Carnegie Hall and the Kennedy Center. In addition, he has toured as a music ambassador for the U.S. State Department.
