= Spanish jazz =

Music genre

Jazz in Spain began with an interest in Dixieland or New Orleans jazz. In that time it evolved into other styles, often influenced by visiting Americans. In 1947 Don Byas introduced Tete Montoliu to bebop, and other efforts to combine jazz with flamenco occurred. Catalan and Galician music have influenced some regions.

Jazz in Spain suffered from many difficulties. These included cultural, political, and economic systems that were unsuitable for creativity. Francisco Franco's regime placed restraints on jazz. The return to democracy and the development of the economy allowed jazz to expand. In turn, some musicians took exile in Spain in the mid-20th century. Singer Donna Hightower took exile from the US in the late 1960s, and returned to the US in 1990.

Spain has many outdoor jazz festivals. The Donostia-San Sebastian Jazz Festival began in 1966. In the middle 1970s, the festival attracted Charles Mingus, Tete Montoliu, Ella Fitzgerald, Oscar Peterson, Dizzy Gillespie, Herbie Hancock, Lionel Hampton, John Lee Hooker, Sonny Rollins, B.B. King, Woody Herman, Freddie Hubbard, Weather Report, Gato Barbieri, Art Blakey, Mercer Ellington, McCoy Tyner, Chick Corea, Clark Terry, and Miles Davis. The festival held in Vitoria-Gasteiz, set up in 1977, also attracts musicians.

== Jazz festivals ==
- Festival de Jazz de Barcelona (Barcelona)
- Vitoria-Gasteiz jazz festival (Vitoria-Gasteiz)
- San Sebastian Jazz Festival (Donostia-San Sebastian)
- Festival de Jazz de Terrassa (Terrassa)
- Festival de Jazz de Valencia (Mar-i-jazz)

== Jazz musicians in Spain ==
=== 20th century ===
- Ramón Evaristo - bandleader, violinist
- Pedro Iturralde - saxophonist in jazz and classical
- Tete Montoliu - pianist

=== Late 20th century ===
{Established in late 20th century, and continuing later}

- Alberto Conde - pianist
- Chano Domínguez - pianist
- Jorge Pardo - saxophonist and flautist who worked with Chick Corea
- Mario Rossi- samba and jazz
- Jorge Rossy - drummer who worked 10 years with the first trio of Brad Mehldau
- Perico Sambeat - saxophonist, flamenco nominee in Latin Grammy Awards of 2005
- Ximo Tebar - guitarist
- Ignasi Terraza - pianist
- Tomatito - guitarist and composer blending flamenco and jazz

=== First established in 21st century ===
- Ester Andujar - singer
- Juan d'Anyelica - guitarist in flamenco and jazz.
- Paloma Berganza - singer
- Oscar Peñas - guitarist and composer
- Alberto Porro Carmona - jazz conductor, musicologist, composer, and saxophone player
