= Mak Grgić =

Slovenian guitarist

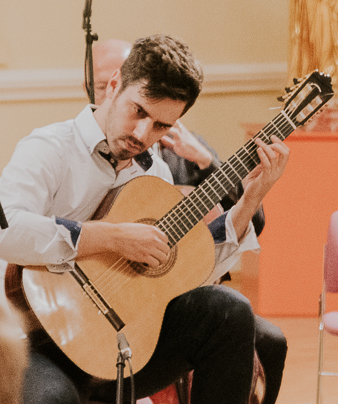
- Grgić with the Slovenian Philharmonic Chamber Ensemble

Background information
- Born: 1987 (age 38–39); Ljubljana, Slovenia
- Genres: Chamber music, classical music, microtonal music
- Occupation: Musician
- Instrument: Guitar
- Labels: Naxos, Marquis Classics, MicroFest
- Website: makgrgic.com

Mak Grgić (pronounced: [mɑk ɡɹɡɪt͡ʃ]; born 7 March 1987) is a Slovenian classical guitarist. He is a four-time Grammy nominee.

== Early life ==
Mak Grgić was born in Ljubljana, Slovenia, back then a part of Yugoslavia. Before embarking on his musical studies, he showed interest in competitive mathematics, earning him no. 1 ranking in the country according to the competition Jurij Vega, and martial arts, winning a title of world champion at the age of 11 according to the Japan Karate Association international regulations. His first appearance on the musical stage was at the age of 12.

== Education ==
Grgić studied with Ante Čagalj at the Elly Bašić Conservatory of Music, Alvaro Pierri at the University for Music and Performing Arts in Vienna, Austria and at USC Thornton School of Music as a student of William Kanengiser, Scott Tennant (Los Angeles Guitar Quartet) and Brian Head, artistic director of Guitar Foundation of America. He was the first guitarist in the history of University of Southern California to be accepted into the artist diploma program. In 2023, Grgić joined the School of Music faculty at the University of South Carolina, becoming the Assistant Professor of Guitar.

== Performance career ==
Grgić has performed at Hotel des Invalides, Paris, France; Teatro alla Scala, Milan, Italy; Koncerthuset, Stockholm, Sweden; Musikverein, Vienna, Austria; Walt Disney Concert Hall, Los Angeles, US; Strathmore Mansion, North Bethesda, Maryland, US; National Gallery of Art, Washington D.C., US; Beloselsky-Belozersky Palace, St. Petersburg, Russia; Accademia Philharmonicorum, Ljubljana, Slovenia among others.

Grgić spent two years in residence at the Da Camera Society of Los Angeles. As a part of this residency, he cofounded a contemporary octet called DC8. This ensemble performed and commissioned new works from Michael Gordon and Nina Šenk. The DC8 ensemble was proclaimed as an "inspiring addition to the contemporary music landscape in Los Angeles" in the Los Angeles Times.

== Collaborations ==
Grgić has collaborated with musicians, such as Jack Quartet, Martin Chalifour (concertmaster, Los Angeles Philharmonic Orchestra), Clive Greensmith (Tokyo String Quartet), and the Assad Brothers guitar duo. He is a founding and active member of Duo Deloro with Adam Del Monte and FretX Duo with Daniel Lippel, guitarist of ICE Ensemble. In September 2018 he toured with Grammy Award-winning singer KD Lang as the opening act on her anniversary Ingenue Tour. In 2020, Grgić began his ongoing collaboration with Billboard Charts-topping pianist Paul Cardall, exploring the meditative and mindful aspects of musical composition. In 2021, he was nominated for a 2022 Grammy Award.

== Other work ==
Grgić has been involved with the Gluck Outreach Program and has done work for Boys and Girls Clubs throughout US. He has fostered a continuous relationship with the Braille Institute in Los Angeles. Grgić also served as a mentor for the Bosana Foundation in Los Angeles and has raised funds for a local orphanage in Zenica, Bosnia and Herzegovina, with which he has personal ties.

In 2017, Grgić along with 13 international guitar festival leaders around Europe initiated EuroStrings, the European Guitar Festival network. EuroStrings has now expanded to a platform of 17 international guitar festivals throughout Europe and globally, working on young artists exchange programs, charity through classical guitar and audience development.

During the COVID-19 pandemic, Grgić founded Virtual Guitar Orchestra, a community-oriented project bringing guitar lovers and guitar super stars together in a virtual musical setting.

== Music ==
Grgić believes in an eclectic approach to classical guitar in order to draw in wider audiences for the instrument. Balkanisms, an album released on Naxos in 2019, encompasses new and ethnic music from the Balkan peninsula. A 2018 album release called Makrotonal binds music of renaissance and baroque with new music influenced by the Middle Eastern traditions on microtonal guitars. Other album releases include flamenco music with flamenco guitarist Adam del Monte and that of cinema music. In 2020, Grgić signed with pianist Paul Cardall's label All Heart Records and released Silent Night, a short album featuring Christmas classics along with "Christmas Dreaming," an original song.
