= Mario Escudero =

Spanish flamenco guitarist (1928–2004)

- Born: October 11, 1928
- Origin: Alicante, Spain
- Died: November 19, 2004 (aged 76)
- Genres: Flamenco
- Instrument: Guitar

Mario Escudero (October 11, 1928 – November 19, 2004), was one of a handful of Spanish flamenco guitar virtuosos who, following on the footsteps of Ramon Montoya, helped spread flamenco beyond their Spanish homeland when they migrated to the United States in the early 1950s. Along with others such as Sabicas, Carlos Montoya and Juan Serrano, Escudero helped forge the viability of solo flamenco guitar as a concert instrument, with lauded performances at New York's Carnegie Hall, Town Hall, and other venues. Invited to perform at the White House for President John F. Kennedy, Escudero was counted among the best in his era; Ramón Montoya called him "the best flamenco guitarist of this new generation."

During the early part of his career, at the age of 15 (1944 - 1954), he began touring extensively with the best known flamenco companies throughout Spain and the rest of Europe (Rosario and Antonio, Vicente Escudero, Estrellita Castro, and Carmen Amaya), playing both as soloist and guitar accompanist. During this time, he made several records with Estrellita Castro, accompanied many of the best flamenco singers of the time, (including Niña de los Peines, Tomas Pavon, José Cepero, Juanito Mohama, Pepe de la Matrona, Jacinto Almadén, Rafael Farina, Pericón de Cadiz, Palanca, Chiquito de Triana, Canalejas de Puerto Real and others. and provided the musical background to several films:

- Brindis a Manolete (1948), with Paquito Rico, Jose Greco, Manolo Badajoz, Rafael Romero "El Gallina", Trio Escudero (Mario performs as one of the guitarists along with his father, mother and one of his aunts, Milagros). This is the first time Escudero would meet Jose Greco, with whom he would perform several years later.
- Jalisco Canta en Sevilla (1949), with Jorge Negrete and Carmen Sevilla
- Cafe Cantante (1951), with Imperio Argentina, Angel Pericet, Rafael Farina, Emilia Escudero. In this film, Mario Escudero is playing is the entire soundtrack.

After completing his obligatory military service in Spain, he toured Central and South America with Carmen Amaya, and in early 1955, the United States with both Vicente Escudero and Jose Greco as soloist and guitar accompanist (from 1950 - 1956).

From 1958 - 1961, he formed his own group "Capricho Español" and performed extensively in Central and South America. From 1961 onward, he settled in the United States to focus on what would become a very successful career as a flamenco concert guitarist. In total, his career as a performer and concert guitarist spanned 47 years, beginning with Vicente Escudero in 1944, and ending in 1991, with his last concert appearances in Spain and the United States. During all of this period, he had a very active concert schedule, performing on a regular basis in the United States and internationally, including several concert tours to Russia (then the Soviet Union), Japan, Hong Kong and Turkey, all as a private citizen; that is, not backed or sponsored by State-financed organizations in any way.

His career as a recording artist, however, was much shorter (17 years, from 1952 - 1969), essentially beginning with his first long play record in 1952 ("El Pili Flamenco", Esoteric-2001, 1952), in which he played guitar duos with Alberto Velez and accompanied the singer "El Pili"), and ending with his last double record album with the Musical Heritage Society in 1969 ("Mario Escudero Plays Classical Flamenco Music", MHS 994/995, 1969). He did not make any more records after 1969, as a result of his long lasting dislike over what he considered to be ongoing unfair commercial practices on the use of his original recordings by some record companies. Nevertheless, during this relatively brief 17 year period, Escudero made over 30 original long play records (both as Mario Escudero and as "El Niño de Alicante").

While he composed more than 250 of his own works, he regularly performed and recorded the works of other notable flamenco and classical guitar masters, like Niño Ricardo ("Almoradí", "Recuerdo a Sevilla"), Esteban de Sanlucar ("Castillo de Xauen", "Mantillas de Feria") or Tarrega ("Recuerdos de la Alhambra"). When he was not performing, he very much enjoyed teaching flamenco guitar to his many students, writing down his own compositions, and furthering his knowledge of harmony and counterpoint, both on his own and studying with other teachers himself. Lastly, he loved listening to and learning from all types of music, including jazz, "soft" rock, all types of folk music and, of course, classical composers like Albeniz, Falla, Granados, Wagner, Beethoven and Bach (the latter of which he always referred to as "el payo Bach", as he regularly listened to Simon Preston´s album of his complete organ works).

He died November, 19th 2004, in Miami, Florida, USA.

== Biography ==
Escudero was born in Alicante, Spain, on October 11, 1928. His mother was Alfonsa Valero Valverde (d. 1947, a/k/a "Josefina", which was her artistic pseudonym). She was a Spanish singer. His father was Jesus Escudero Jiménez (d. 1966), a gypsy. Jesus´s family originally came from Tudela, Navarre, Spain, although they also settled in Huesca and Zaragoza (Aragón). Escudero was an only child.

Settling in the Spanish city of San Sebastian, the family opened and ran a tailor shop. The breakout of the Spanish Civil War forced them to emigrate to southern France. While in France, Jesus formed the "Trio Escudero". The three members of the Trio Escudero were Mario´s father Jesus, his mother, and his aunt Milagros. They performed with artists like Maurice Chevalier and Mistinguette. Escudero's first performance in 1937 at the age of 9 was with Chevalier at the Cinema Galia in Bordeaux, France.

After the war, the family returned to Spain and settled in Madrid, although they always lived between Madrid and San Sebastian, as Escudero would himself recalled in several interviews.

His father, while not a soloist, was a guitar accompanist.

=== Personal life ===
In 1952, Escudero married Maria Amaya, with whom he had a son.

Escudero and Maria separated after a few years, and they both remarried. Escudero eventually married his second wife, Anita Ramos, and the couple had three children.

== Career ==
=== 1944 - 1965 ===
On April 15, 1944, Escudero gave his first performance as a soloist, and accompanied Vicente Escudero and Carmita Garcia at the Palacio de la Musica theater in Barcelona. On June 6, 1944, he debuted with them and his teacher in Madrid at the Teatro Español. For approximately the next 5 years, he frequently performed with Estrellita Castro, and Vicente Escudero. His early solo performances are well received by the public and critics.)

Escudero began to perform frequently with Carmen Amaya in early 1950, when he joined her to tour South America. In September, 1951, he again performed with her at the Teatro Fontalba in Madrid.

In 1952, Escudero made the record "El Pili" Flamenco.

In April 1953, he performed with Carmen Amaya again at the Teatro Quintero in Madrid, and was on tour with her again throughout Spain until September, 1951. He joined Estrellita Castro and her "Romeria" show to perform at La Zarzuela Theater, and remained with her until May 1954.

In 1955, Escudero made two records:

- "Flamenco played by Mario Escudero"
- "Fiesta Flamenca" - with "El Bailete"

Together with his new group "El Bailete", he rejoined Vicente Escudero for Vicente's farewell tour of the United States, starting in February 1955.

In April 1956 he rejoins Vicente Escudero at the Plaza Hotel Persian Room in New York for a 3-week engagement. In one of these performances at the Persian Room, Escudero tripped on someone´s foot, falling on top of his guitar, smashing it beyond repair. Escudero got up, went back stage, got a replacement guitar, and returned to complete the show to a standing ovation.

In 1956, Escudero made four records:

- "Mario Escudero and his flamenco guitar"
- "Guitar Variations - Mario Escudero with Domingo Alvarado"
- "Danzas y Canciones de Andalucia"
- "Luisa Triana, with Mario Escudero - Temas de España"

He performed again at Carnegie Hall, New York, with dancer Luisa Triana, and singer Chinin de Triana on June 9, 1956.

In 1957, Escudero made six records:

- "Vicente Escudero. Flamenco!"
- "Sabicas and Escudero, Flamenco Styles on Two Guitars"
- "Federico Garcia Lorca - Poemas del Cante Jondo", with Enrique Montoya
- Juerga Gitana, Enrique Montoya with Mario Escudero
- "Mario Escudero y su Ballet Flamenco"
- "Flamenco Festival in Hi Fi"

At the end of 1956, Escudero decided not to return to Spain, but remain with his family in the United States. He performed at the Chateau Madrid, New York, with Tere Maya (January 4–28, 1957), Palumbos, Philadelphia (February, 1957), The Orange Gardens of the Everglades Club (March, 1957), while he continued to his regular TV and radio performances as a soloist, appearing on "The Vic Damone Show" (July and November, 1957), "The Ed Sullivan Show" (March, 1957), "The Johnny Carson Show" (June, 1957), "Jack Paar Show" (October, 1957), Channel 5, Baltimore (October 5, 1957), KCBH Radio (October 11, 1957), and others. Again he performed at Carnegie Hall, with Tere Amoros (November, 1957).

In 1958, he made five records:

- Viva Flamenco!
- The Fantastic Guitars of Sabicas and Escudero
- Flamenco Carnival
- Festival Gitana
- Sabicas - Gypsy Flamenco

From early 1959 until the end of 1960, he performed with his own group "El Capricho Español" throughout Central and South America, and also performed with Miguel Molina on various occasions in theaters and television, in both Argentina and Uruguay.

=== 1965 - 1981 ===
On a few occasions, Escudero performed with orchestras. The Spanish composer, Federico Moreno Torroba, based his "Fantasia Flamenca" for guitar and orchestra on his themes, and Escudero premiered it at Carnegie Hall on November 28, 1976, with the American Symphony Orchestra, Antonio Almeida conducting. Upon special request, he also performed Rodrigo´s "Concierto de Aranjuez" on the 17th and the 18th of November, 1977, with the Lexington Philharmonic Orchestra under George Zack.

== List of performances and concerts ==
=== 1944 - 1954 (Spain, Europe and South America) ===
- April 15, 1944, Palacio de la Musica, (Barcelona): Mario Escudero's first performance as a professional guitarist was at the age of 15. Cast: Includes Vicente Escudero, Carmita Garcia, Mario Escudero and Manuel Rivera. Palacio de la Musica.
- June 6, 1944, Teatro Español (Madrid): Mario Escudero debuts with Vicente Escudero and Carmita Garcia in Madrid. Cast: Includes Vicente Escudero, Carmita Garcia, Ramon Montoya ("...a la guitarra de concierto). A repeat concert was scheduled for June 9th, but had to be suspended due to sickness of Carmita Garcia.
- July 20, 1945, Plaza de Toros Arenas (Barcelona): Espectaculo "Grandioso Espectaculo Andaluz". Cast: Mario Escudero (as soloist), but also accompanies Canalejas, Palanca, Niño Leon and Chiquito de Triana.
- In 1945, in San Sebastian, Mario records with Estrellita Castro, "Los Marismeños" (Bulerias) and "Niña Caracola" (Tanguillos) - (78 RPM, Columbia R 14333).
- September 27, 28, 1946, Teatro Romea (Barcelona): Cast: Includes Pepe Blanco, Carmen Morell, Mario Escudero and Rosario Escudero. Critic comments "Mario Escudero...notable concertista ...".
- January 8 and 9, 1947, Teatro Cómico de Madrid (Madrid): Show "Yo Soy un Señorito". Cast: Includes Pericon de Cadiz, Lola Ramos, Mario Escudero, Ricardo Alpuente, Rosita Cadenas and Charito Sainz de Mirras.
- September 6, 1947, Teatro de La Zarzuela (Madrid): Vicente Escudero and Carmita Garcia. The reviewer says "hubo aplausos para todos...y para Mario Escudero en sus interpretaciones como solista", making it clear that, since the beginning, Mario´s interest was to follow in the footsteps of his mentor, Ramon Montoya, and not only be a guitar accompanist.
- January 17–24, 1948, Sala de Fiestas Madrigal (Madrid). The advertisement only mentions Mario Escudero "...el gran guitarrista"
- Marzo 5, 1952, Teatro Alcazar (Madrid): Cast: Includes Rosario y Antonio, El Pili, Mario Escudero, Alberto Velez, Juan de la Mata, Angel Currás, Julian Perera
- Marzo, 14, 1952 - April 6, 1952, Teatro Español (Madrid): Cast: Includes Rosario y Antonio, El Pili, Mario Escudero, Alberto Velez, Juan de la Mata, Angel Currás, Julian Perera.
- June 16, 17, 1952, Plaza de los Aljibes de La Alhambra (Granada): Cast: Includes Rosario y Antonio, El Pili, Mario Escudero, Alberto Velez, Juan de la Mata, Angel Currás, Julian Perera
- Julio 1 - 6, 1952, Teatro Maravillas (Madrid): Cast: Includes Rosario y Antonio, El Pili, Mario Escudero, Alberto Velez, Juan de la Mata, Angel Currás, Julian Perera.
- September 11, 1952, Theatre des Champs-Elysses (Paris): Cast: Includes Rosario y Antonio, El Pili, Mario Escudero, Alberto Velez, Juan de la Mata, Angel Currás, Julian Perera
- September 24, 1953, Teatro de la Zarzuela (Madrid): Estrellita Castro."Romeria". Cast: Includes Estrellita Castro, Mario Escudero, El Granaino, Laura Alonso, Esperanza Ortiz, Laura Roman, Estrella Lopez, among others. In May, 1953, Estrellita Castro announces her return to Spain after 5 years in South America .
- October 7, 11, 1953, Teatro de la Zarzuela (Madrid): Estrellita Castro."Romeria". Cast: Includes Estrellita Castro, Mario Escudero, El Granaino, Laura Alonso, Esperanza Ortiz, Laura Roman, Estrella Lopez, among others.
- December 23, 1953 - 7/1/1954, Teatro Calderon (Madrid): Estrellita Castro."Romeria". Cast: Includes Estrellita Castro, Mario Escudero, El Granaino, Laura Alonso, Esperanza Ortiz, Laura Roman, Estrella Lopez, among others
- In 1954, in Barcelona, Mario records with Estrellita Castro, "Gitanos Falsificaos" and "La Salinera" - (78 RPM, Odeon 204523). Also with guitarist Antonio Serra.
- In 1954, in Barcelona, Mario records with Estrellita Castro, "Tanguillos del Campo de Gibraltar" - (78 RPM, Odeon 204522). Also with guitarist Antonio Serra.
- April 17, 1954, Teatro de la Zarzuela (Madrid): Estrellita Castro "Romeria". Cast: Includes Estrellita Castro, Mario Escudero, El Granaino, Maria Amaya, Amalia Roman, Esperanza Ortiz, Josele, Paco Sanchez. This is an entirely new group, and Mario´s wife, Maria Amaya, joins the group.
- May 5, 1954, Teatro Maravillas (Madrid): Estrellita Castro "Romeria". Cast: Includes Estrellita Castro, Mario Escudero, El Granaino, Maria Amaya, Amalia Roman, Esperanza Ortiz, Josele, Paco Sanchez.

=== 1955 - 1961 (United States, Central and South America) ===
- January 25, 1955. Mario Escudero, together with his wife Maria Amaya, his cousin Rosario Escudero, and other members of his "Bailete", as well as members of Vicente Escudero´s own dance company, arrived in New York City on January 25, 1955 on board the USS Constitution.

== Recordings ==
Escudero's first recordings date from 1945 when he was 16 years old, as an accompanist to Estrellita Castro.

He recorded three albums of guitar duets with Sabicas:

- 1957: "Sabicas and Escudero, Flamenco Styles on Two Guitars"
- 1958: "The Fantastic Guitars of Sabicas and Escudero"
- 1959: "The Romantic Guitars of Sabicas and Escudero"

Shortly before he died, a reporter asked Sabicas: "Which, of the many records you have made during your long career, is your favorite?" He did not have to wait too long for his reply: "Of all, I only like the one I made with the guitarist Mario Escudero." Be it as it may, the fact is that both Sabicas and Escudero listened to these records, especially the first two "Flamenco Styles on Two Guitars" and " The Fantastic Guitars of Sabicas and Escudero", practically in every family reunion.

Escudero liked the same two records he made with Sabicas. He was also fond of the ones he had made with ABC Paramount, and of the last double album he recorded with the Musical Heritage Society in 1969.
