= Ester Andujar =

Spanish jazz singer (born 1976)

Ester Andújar
- Born: 29th June, 1976; Valencia, Spain
- Genre: Jazz
- Occupation: Singer
- Years active: 1996–present

Ester Andujar (in Spanish, Andújar), born 1976 in Valencia, is a Spanish jazz singer notable among the younger generation of Spanish jazz musicians.

She began singing professionally in 1996 and went on to receive the Valencian Jazz Awards 'Promusics' Best vocalist in 2001 and 2002. She has toured in Latin America and Branford Marsalis invited her to sing during his tour of Spain. Her most recent CD is Celebrating Cole Porter (2006).

Also this year, she has presented her album in Argentina, starting her tour in Buenos Aires, within the Jazzology Cycle (Centro Cultural General San Martín) and continuing in La Plata and Mar del Plata Jazz Festival.

She has filled the Teatro "El Musical" in Valencia with the presentation of her album and received numerous applause from critics and audiences with her album and live show. She has been selected as a semi-finalist for the second consecutive year in the "Montreux Jazz Voice Competition" and chosen as a representative of her generation by the magazine "Interviú" for its celebration of 30 years, under the heading "Triunfadores a los 30".

In 2007, she has collaborated in the albums of Ricardo Belda (El Principio) and Jerez Texas (Patchwork), and has been invited by the Europa Jazz Festival, in Bucharest, where he has toured presenting Celebrating Cole Porter. In May 2007, she attended the Europa Jazz Festival in Bucharest, where she was invited for the second consecutive year, this year to play with her trio format, "Tres por el Jazz".

In December 2008, she released her third album, ¨Páginas Preciosas¨, based on her own compositions sung in Spanish and Valencian, where all her musical influences converge, from Brazilian music to jazz, soul or funk, along with Donald Edwards (drums), César Giner (bass), Ximo Tébar (guitars), Edmundo Carneiro (percussion) and Stephan Braun (cello). She studied for a semester at Berklee School of Music in Boston between 2009-2010, with a scholarship from this institution and the SGAE. She has presented her latest album in Spain, Lebanon, Jordan, Morocco and other parts of the world, invited by the Cervantes Institute to present ¨Páginas Preciosas¨.

In the last years, she has made two new projects: De Cançons i de Llunes (with her own compositions and jazz standards and Valencian popular music in jazz key), and Suite Nivola, a tribute to the novel Niebla by Unamuno, based on original compositions that deal with the existentialist themes addressed in the novel.

She is currently preparing the mixing and mastering of her new album, ”Inner songs”, recorded in April 2024 with Albert Palau on piano, Miquel Àlvarez on double bass, Tico Porcar on drums, Iván Cebrián on guitar and the saxophone player Javier Vercher as a guest artist.

In this album, Ester goes a little deeper in the path opened by her previous work. "Páginas preciosas", and seeks, through the composition of lyrics and music, to express in jazz key issues such as loneliness, love, heartbreak, violence and the Spanish republic. She sings in Valencian, Spanish English and Portuguese.

Some press and media reviews:

- https://jazzeseruido.blogspot.com/2009/01/ester-andjar.html

-http://lamusicaquenosonoenlos40principales.blogspot.com/2009/08/ester-andujar.html

- http://www.distritojazz.com/home/web.php?seccion=4&idAlbum=631

- http://jazzeseruido.blogspot.com/2009/01/ester-andjar.html

-https://www.lasprovincias.es/valencia/20091024/vida-ocio/valenciana-berklee-20091024.html

Extracts from other reviews:

Ester Andújar doctors her jazz in New York.

"Ester Andújar (...) starts the year as she ended it: adding to the international jazz scene. After winning second prize at the VIIth Monaco Jazz Soloists Competition and receiving the Jury Prize at the Shure Montreux Voice Jazz Competition from its president, soprano Barbara Hendricks, the young Valencian singer continues with her musical incursions beyond our borders (...) Her refined technique and expressive capacity contrast with a rigorous knowledge of the language and a surprising mastery of the stage (...).”

Pablo Sanz, El Mundo, January 14, 2006.

Tribute

"Ester Andujar recalls in this work the songs of the late Cole Porter with a great voice, jazz rhythm and some modern arrangements (...) The singer interprets with a voice that is sometimes tender, sometimes seductive (...).”

Interviú, January 9, 2006.

"With first-class material, extracted from the repertoire of one of the best authors of all times; with the soft, sensual and deep voice of the Valencian Ester Andujar and with the collaboration of a handful of first line musicians, only an exceptional result can be obtained. This is what happens in this tribute to Cole Porter, which recovers some of his best-known songs as well as others that are not so well known, and passes them through the filter of a singer on the rise, to achieve a highly recommended album."

(Score: ****) . Cartelera del Levante. June 2005.

"Despite her youth, this Valencian singer is already a leading voice in our jazz. Her tribute to Cole Porter, recorded in New Jersey, is one more step in her ascending career, another sample of her portentous vocal and artistic capacity."(Score: ***)

Pablo Sanz. La Luna de Metrópoli. El Mundo. July 2005.

"A beautiful and well-educated voice that takes advantage of the colorful pop but deploys jazz knowledge and does not forget to improvise, as she proved in the two series of sparkling scat that she traced at the end of his performance".

Juanma Játiva, El País, VI UPV Jazz Week.

"Precisely courage is what singer Ester Andújar squanders to face a repertoire of classic and modern jazz with her voice that has attracted the attention of the most refined interpreters. She does so in Tristeza de mar."

Jorge Alcalde, Muy Interesante, May 03.

Pablo Sanz, Scherzo. No. 244, September 2009
