= Nils Klöfver =

Swedish classical guitarist

Nils Klöfver (born 13 November 1982 in Stockholm) is classical guitarist who plays the 11-string alto guitar as well as the standard 6-string instrument. With a strong focus on chamber music he has performed and recorded in ensembles with violin, flute, string quartet and singers.

Nils Klöfver graduated from the Bachelor of Music (Hons) course at the Royal College of Music in 2006 with a first class degree. In the same year he also won first prize in the yearly Royal College of Music Guitar Competition, made his debut at the Wigmore Hall and appeared as a finalist in the distinguished Jörgen Rörby competition in Sweden.

During his college years he studied with Carlos Bonell and Gary Ryan and also participated in master classes with John Williams, David Russell, Roland Dyens and Marco Socias among others. He has received scholarships from the Swedish Royal Academy of Music (Kungl. Musikaliska Akademien), The Cultural Board of the Council of Borlänge and Sparbanksstiftelsen.

== Recordings ==
Guitar & Alto Guitar is Nils Klöfver's first album with music for classical guitar and 11-string alto guitar. Works by J.S. Bach, J. Dowland, F. Tarrega, R. Dyens among others.
Variety Lights is an album with violin and guitar ensemble Kleiman Klöfver Duo. Works by G.F. Händel, T. Aulin, M. de Falla among others. Romance d'Amour

== Publications ==
Nils Klöfver has published a number of chamber music arrangements with guitar with different publishers, e.g. Gehrmans Music Publishing and Ernesto Musikverlag.
