= Brad Richter =

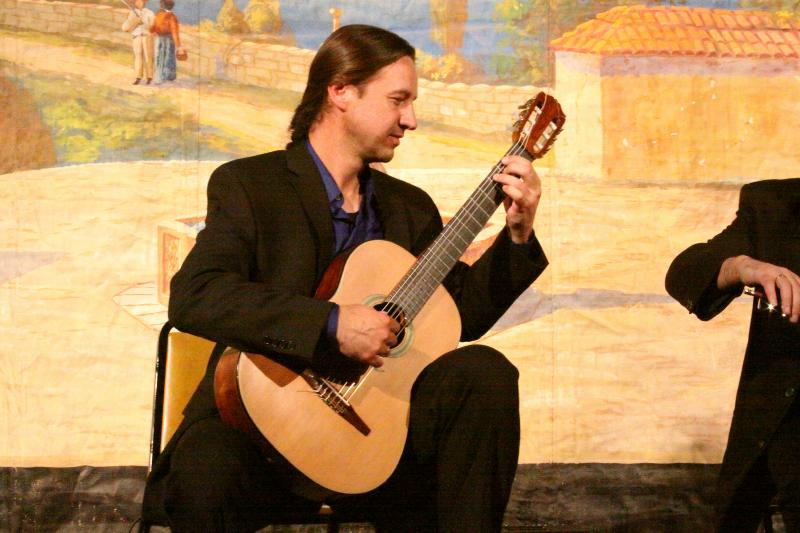
- At the Poncan Theatre in Ponca City, Oklahoma (2011)

Background information
- Born: Bradley Nathan Richter; August 9, 1969 (age 57)
- Website: bradrichter-guitar.com

Bradley Nathan Richter (born August 9, 1969) is an American classical guitarist.

== Education and background ==
Richter was born in Enid, Oklahoma in 1969. At the age of 18, Richter was awarded the Presidential Scholarship to the American Conservatory of Music in Chicago where he began performing, composing, and eventually teaching professionally. After completing his undergraduate degrees in performance and composition, Richter accepted a scholarship to the Royal College of Music in London where he studied with guitarist Carlos Bonell.

== Career highlights ==
After completing his master's degree at the Royal College of Music in London, Richter has performed throughout North America and Europe as a soloist and in duos with artists such as Grammy-winner David Finckel of the Emerson String Quartet, Royal College of Music Professor Carlos Bonell, and Viktor Uzur (cello) as the Richter Uzur Duo. Festival appearances have included The Aspen Music Festival, The London International Guitar Festival and the Walnut Valley Festival, where he won the National Finger-picking Championship in 1999.

Richter is also an accomplished composer. In addition to his collections of concert music for solo guitar (published by Mel Bay and GSP), Richter is an avid composer of chamber music. He is a winner of the International Composers Guild Competition, and he wrote and performed a score for the Emmy award-winning PBS television series, The Desert Speaks. Richter is regularly featured on NPR's Performance Today as a soloist and with the Richter Uzur Duo.

== Residency and outreach ==
Richter has taught at the Sherwood Conservatory of Music in Chicago and the University of Arizona and given workshops around the United States since 1995. Most notably he is the co-founder and Executive Director of Lead Guitar, a nonprofit organization that establishes guitar programs in schools with large populations of at-risk kids. In 2013 Lead Guitar became part of the University of Arizona where Richter is now the Director of Arts Outreach for the College of Fine Arts.

== Selected works ==
Year	Title	Type	Publisher/Record Company
1994	Dance of the Harvest Fires	CD	Harmon E Records
1996	Fractal Reflections	Sheet Music, Solo Guitar	Guitar Solo Publications
1996	The Harvest	Sheet Music, Solo Guitar	Guitar Solo Publications
1996	Eight Preludes	Sheet Music, Solo Guitar	Guitar Solo Publications
1997	Fractal Reflections	CD	Harmon E Records
1998	Four Native Tales	Sheet Music, Solo Guitar	Guitar Solo Publications
2000	When the Caged Bird Sings	Sheet Music, Flute/Guitar	Lathkill Music Publishers, England
2001	Frost Songs	Sheet Music, Sop./Guitar	Lathkill Music Publishers, England
2003	A Whisper in the Desert	CD	Acoustic Music Records, Germany
2004	Master Fingerstyle Guitar Anthology	Book/CD set	Mel Bay Publications
2004	Nouveau Classic Guitar	Anthology Book/CD set co-authors include: Sergio Assad, Andrew York	Mel Bay Publications
2005	The Brad Richter Solo Collection	Book/CD set	Mel Bay Publications
2007	Song of the Wild	Book/CD set	Acoustic Music Books
2007	Arranging for Guitar	Instruction Book/CD	Mel Bay
2007	Navigating Lake Bonneville	Book with CD	Weber State University Press
