= Gino D'Auri =

- Born: December 3, 1937; Rome, Kingdom of Italy
- Died: January 26, 2007 (aged 69) Los Angeles, California, U.S.
- Genres: Classical; Flamenco; New flamenco
- Occupation: Instrumentalist (guitar)
- Instruments: Flamenco guitar; classical guitar

Gino D'Auri (December 3, 1937 – January 26, 2007) was an Italian flamenco, fusion and classical guitarist of Romani origin.

D'Auri was born in Rome. He moved to Los Angeles in 1967, where he began playing in flamenco clubs. In 1976, he recorded with fusion group Caldera, releasing an album of the same name. In 1980, he met Stephen Hill, who produced his first album Nuevos Caminos, re-released in 1984 as Passion Play. He collaborated with Japanese fusion artist Keiko Matsui in the late 1980s, and features on two of her albums. Later album releases include Flamenco Mystico (1992) and Flamenco: Passion & Soul (1997). He gained a reputation performing in restaurants and clubs in Los Angeles. He died from cancer at the age of 69.

== Biography ==
Gino D'Auri was born in Rome on December 3, 1937, with a Romani heritage. As a teenager he showed promise as a classical guitarist and began performing in recitals around Italy and won some local guitar competitions. He had a change of musical direction however when he saw the movie Sombrero which featured the famous flamenco dancer José Greco. D'Auri reported to have been "traumatized by his dancing and the music of flamenco guitarist Gerónimo Villarino". He saw the movie several times in order to absorb the music and replicate what he had heard. In the following years he began studying flamenco music in Italy and Spain and began touring with several dance companies.

In 1967, at the age of 30, he moved to Los Angeles and began playing regularly in Los Angeles and Santa Monica flamenco clubs like the Matador. In the late 1960s his idol, Greco, approached him after a performance and asked him to join the José Greco Dance company. They performed together during the early 1970s and Greco became a mentor to D'Auri. During the late 1970s D'Auri was performing at the Lares and El Cid and was said to be on stage nearly every night of the week. In 1976, he recorded with Caldera, a Latin band that combined jazz, funk, rock and Latin music on their self-titled debut album.

In 1980 Stephen Hill, presenter for the radio show Hearts of Space, met D'Auri and was asked to produce D'Auri's first album Nuevos Caminos (translated as New Paths) on harpist Georgia Kelly's label Heru Records. In 1984, the album was remastered and re-released as Passion Play under the record label Sonic Atmosphere. In the late 1980s, D'Auri also played guitar on two albums by Japanese new age world fusion artist Keiko Matsui. In the 1990s D'Auri recorded two further solo albums Flamenco Mystico and Flamenco: Passion & Soul with some tracks accompanied by cello and percussion. His last recorded solo album was Flamenco Passion in 2003. D'Auri died of cancer at the age of 70 at his Los Angeles home on 26 January 2007. D'Auri, who was married twice, is survived by wife Dahad of 30 years. He has been reported playing music on the stage of El Cid in Southern California even after his death.

== Musical influences and style ==
While D'Auri was primarily a flamenco guitarist he was also influenced by other styles such as classical, Latin and various world music. Some of his songs contain middle eastern and Indian musical textures with dark droning bass overtones and hypnotic percussion. His albums were released under record labels usually associated with new age and ambient music. On his first album Passion Play, D'Auri created a unique sound by amplifying a Japanese Takamine guitar with a built in pick up and shaping the sound through a digital reverb unit. D'Auri also utilized improvisation in his playing and valued emotional expression over the striving for perfection. "Striving for perfection gets in the way of the feeling," he says. "When you improvise you can't allow yourself to think about anything but the feeling of the moment. That's where great music comes from". Many of the tracks on his albums are recorded in one take without overdubs. D'Auri likens his style of playing flamenco to the blues where the rules of rhythm are strict, but there is much melodic freedom. In an interview promoting his album Flamenco: Passion & Soul, D'Auri states:

These days, many people think that flamenco is about playing sixty thousand notes as quickly as possible. My flamenco is slower, very traditional and down to earth. I may use cello and percussion, but it's done in a traditional way, without a lot of notes. For me the music is about feeling and improvisation. I like to take chances, the communication is better that way. Like the blues, the rules of rhythm are strict, but there is much melodic freedom, the possibility of limitless improvisation, and a need to express the feelings that arise from a unique way of life.

== Discography ==
=== Self ===
- Nuevos Caminos (new Paths, 1980) reissued as Passion Play (Sonic Atmospheres, 1984)
- Flamenco Mystico (Hearts of Space, 1992)
- New Land (Impressions, 1996)
- Flamenco: Passion & Soul (20 May 1997)
- Flamenco Passion (2003)

=== Guest artist ===
- Caldera self-titled debut album 1976
- Keiko Matsui (1984 Under Northern Lights & 1991 Night Waltz)
