= El Viejín =

- Born: José Jiménez; 1962 (age 63–64); Madrid
- Genres: Flamenco
- Instrument: Flamenco guitar

El Viejín (born José Jiménez in 1962 in Madrid, in Caño Roto, the Gypsy part of Carabanchel, an old neighborhood of the capital) is a Spanish flamenco guitarist. He is often billed as José Jiménez 'El Viejín'. El viejín means "the little old man". He acquired this nickname when very young because listeners were amazed at his talent—thus, the nickname indicated that he played like a much older player. Influenced by Sabicas like many of his contemporaries, he rose to fame as a flamenco guitarist in the late 1970s and 1980s and is one of the best-known Madrid-based flamenco guitarists. Transcriptions to his works have been created by a Madrid-based guitarist and musicologist Enrique Vargas and published by VG Ediciones In 2008 he was reported to be "in the process of founding the Caño Roto school of flamenco guitar with his long-time friend Enrique Vargas."

== Discography ==
Algo Que Decir ("Something to Say", Nuevos Medios S.A., 1999)
