= Diego del Gastor =

Spanish flamenco guitarist (1908–1973)

del Gastor, 1969

Diego del Gastor (March 15, 1908 in Arriate Málaga, Spain – July 7, 1973 in Morón de la Frontera, Sevilla) was a Spanish flamenco guitarist. He was the creator and exponent of the guitar playing tradition of Morón de la Frontera. This tradition was continued by his nephews, grandnephews and nieces.

== Discography ==
=== Soloist ===
- Misterios de la guitarra flamenca (Ariola 10521-A, 1972)
- Evocaciones (Pasarela, 1990)
- El eco de unos toques (book + CD, El Flamenco Vive, 2007), incl. Misterios de la guitarra flamenca y Evocaciones.
- Flamenco y Universidad Vol. IV (Marita, 2009)

=== Accompanist ===
- Los cantes inéditos de Juan Talega (Coliseum, 1991)
- Fernanda y Bernarda de Utrera: cantes inéditos (book + CD, Diputación de Sevilla, 1999)
- Alcalá de Guadaíra en la historia del flamenco (Marita, 2007)
