= Aniya la Gitana =

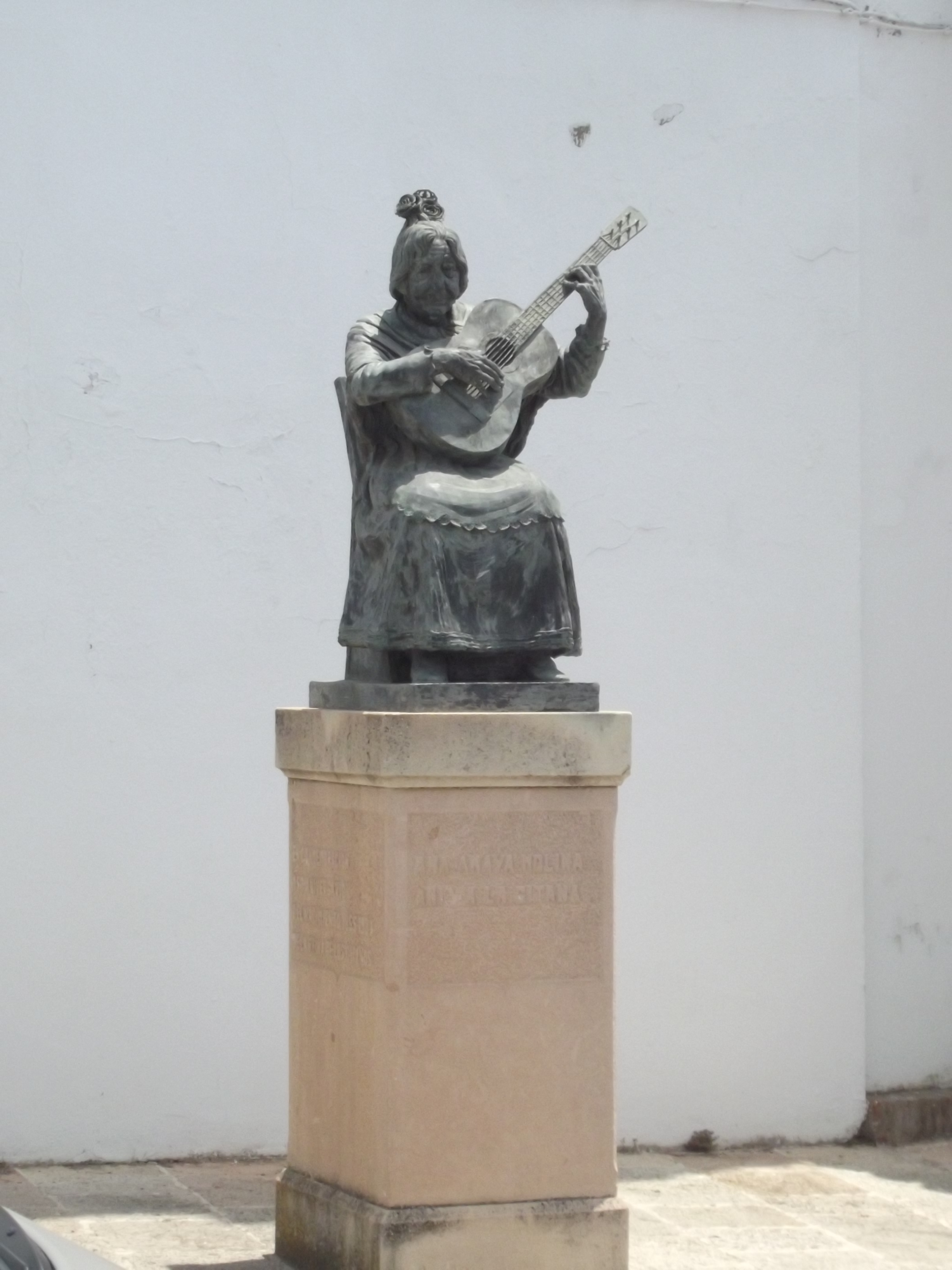
- Statue of Aniya la Gitana in Ronda, Spain.
- Born: Ana Amaya Molina; 1855; Ronda, Spain
- Died: 1933 (aged 77–78); Barcelona, Spain
- Other name: Anilla la de Ronda
- Occupations: Flamenco guitarist, singer, dancer

Aniya la Gitana (Aniya the Gypsy) was the stage name used by Ana Amaya Molina also known as Anilla la de Ronda (1855–1933). She was a Spanish flamenco guitarist, singer and dancer.

== Biography ==
Molina was born in 1855 in Ronda, in southern Spain. She began her artistic career playing in cafes in her home region of southern Spain, where she used to sing and accompany herself with her guitar.

She met the singer Antonio Chacón and the singer Paca Aguilera, another gypsy from Ronda, Spain, with whom she performed in 1890 at Café Chinitas in Málaga, Spain, which at that time was a hot spot for flamenco.

Anecdotes testify to her notoriety.

- The Sevillian flamenco dancer Pastora Imperio insisted on meeting her and on doing so, offered her a flounced flamenco dance costume;
- Queen Victoria Eugenia, on the occasion of an intimate party for the royal family, gave her a Manila shawl;
- Federico García Lorca quoted her, along with other singers, at a conference entitled "Historical and artistic importance of the unspoiled primitive Andalusian song called Cante Jondo," read in Granada, Spain in 1922.
- José Carlos de Luna dedicated a poem to her in his book El Cristo de los Gitanos (The Christ of the Gypsies).

In 1930, then aged 75, she was one of the main attractions of Andalusian Week at the Barcelona Exhibition. She sang and danced there, accompanied on guitar by Ramón Montoya.

=== Accolades ===
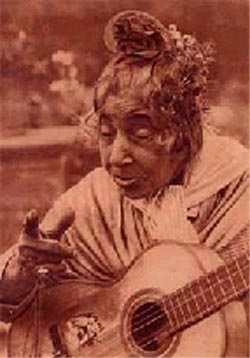
Flamenco guitarist, singer, dancer Aniya la Gitana.

Gaspar Núñez de Prado in his work Cantaores Andaluces dedicated a chapter to her. Among the comments he published about Aniya's flamenco personality, these stand out:

"She feels art as the heart that feels it the most; she conceives beauty as the brain constituted to conceive it better; she feels the generosities of that art, as the soul that can feel it most intensely; but her heart, her brain and her soul absolutely human, in every meaning of the word; they only see in their art a vehicle to send from their bowels to infinity all the expression of their exquisite tenderness...” "That is what has made her more sympathetic, even more than her own qualities for cante (song), and that is due, in the first place, to the artistic triumphs she has achieved and the applause she has obtained." (Núñez de Prado, 1904)

In a 24 June 1930 article by D. José Benavides that appeared in Estampa, he called Aniya "the queen of the gypsies" and said:

“The house where Anita Amaya lives in Ronda is a place of pilgrimage. The judge, the mayor, the pharmacist, the notary, the ladies of high and low condition, all parade in front of her home, archive of popular knowledge. Daily, from Barcelona, a telegram is sent to the town hall secretary in Ronda, to say that the old gypsy woman eats well, sleeps little and drinks a lot. Telegrams are also sent to the gypsies who, already impatient, are demanding her return. But she does not want to leave."

=== Death ===
She died in 1933 in Barcelona at about 78 years of age. In her memory, the City of Ronda dedicates an annual flamenco song contest to her.
