= Vincent Lindsey-Clark =

British musician

Vincent Lindsey-Clark (born 1956) is a British performer, teacher, and composer of music for classical guitar.

== Studies ==
Vincent Lindsey-Clark attended the Royal College of Music. At 16, he won the prestigious Lanchester International Guitar Competition.

== Teaching ==
Vincent Lindsey-Clark has taught classical guitar at Eton, at London's Centre for Young Musicians, as well as at West Dean College, the Taranaki Guitar Summer School in 2016, and workshops at the Saffron Centre for Young Musicians.

== Notable compositions and recordings ==
As a composer, Lindsey-Clark's works have featured on radio, television and films. He has also composed music specifically for guitar students. These include the pieces Steely Blue and Mississippi Ditty from his Simply Swing collection, and Cycles In The Avenue from his collection Five Pictures of Sark (inspired by a visit to the island on his honeymoon), which have variously featured in intermediate guitar syllabuses from ABRSM and Trinity examination boards.

Lindsey-Clark's work Salsa Roja features on a Berta Rojas album which went on to be nominated for a Latin Grammy Award in 2014.

Lindsey-Clark's recordings include Theo's Brother, an album on which he performs, among other compositions, Five Pictures of Sark in its entirety.

Lindsey-Clark's piece Shadow of The Moon is also a favourite for solo musicians, and has been performed by notable guitarists including David Russell. Lindsey-Clark himself performs the piece on Theo's Brother, noting in the sleeve notes that it was in part inspired by his insights and discoveries as an amateur astronomer.

Pulsar, a modern piece originally written for The Beatty Classical Guitar Competition in 2009, similarly appears in soloists' repertoires.

=== Segovia Trio ===
Lindsey-Clark is a member of the Segovia Trio, together with Roland Gallery and Alexander MacDonald. The trio have released four CDs.

== Critical acclaim ==
Tim Panting of Classical Guitar magazine has said of Lindsey-Clark that he "has an extensive knowledge of repertoire to fuel a very inventive compositional engine. Lindsey-Clark seems to revel in the guitar’s most vital qualities. He uses dissonance only when needed and as with greats such as Maurice Ravel the form of these miniatures is always concise..."
