= Patricia Rozario =

British opera singer

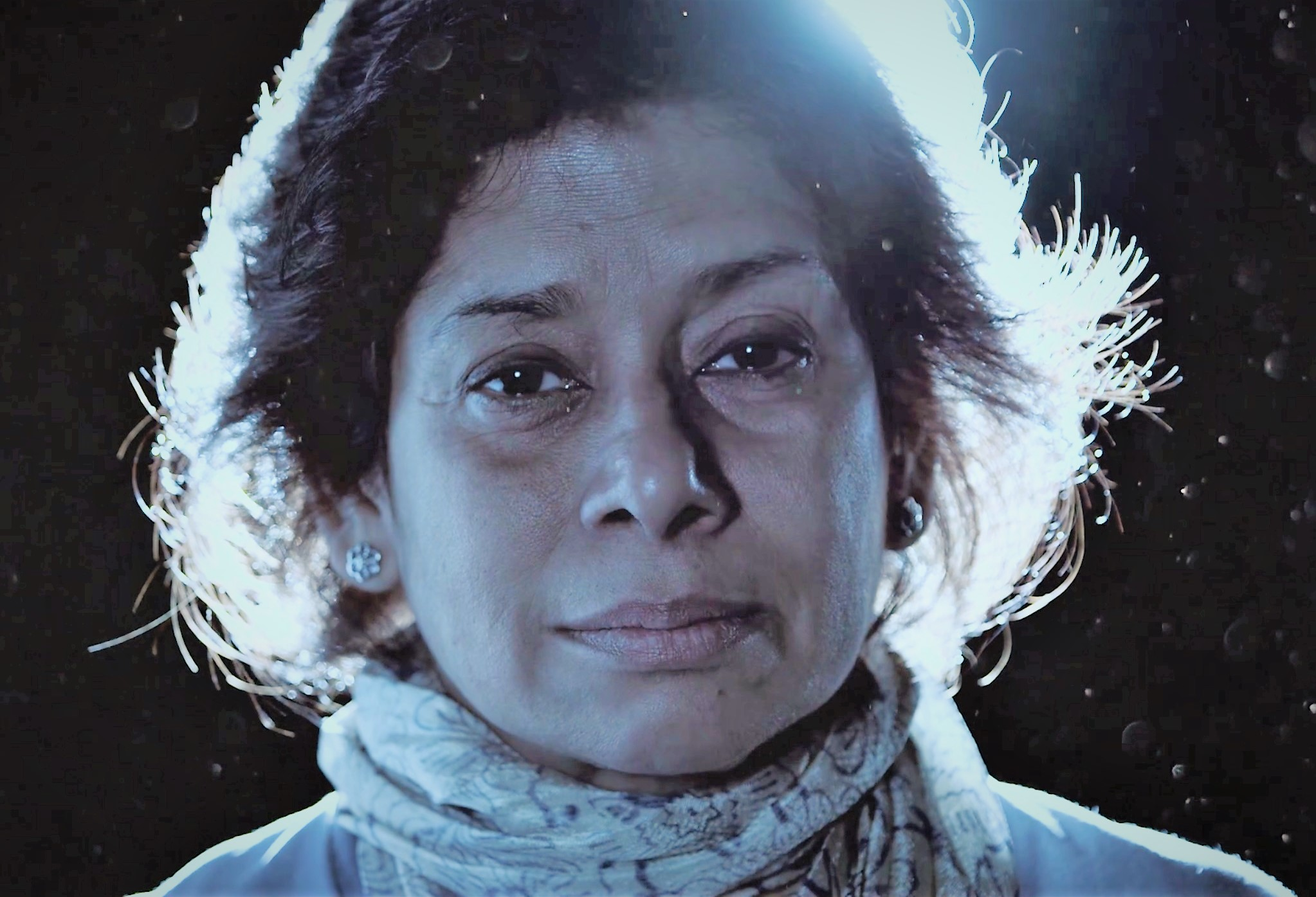
- Rozario in trailer for Opera for the Unknown Woman, 2016

Background information
- Born: 1960 (age 65–66); Bombay, Bombay State, India
- Origin: India
- Genres: Classical, Opera
- Occupation: Opera Singer
- Instrument: Voice
- Label: Hyperion

Patricia Maria Rozario OBE (born 1960) is a British soprano.

== Early life ==
Patricia Maria Rozario was born in Bombay, India in 1960. After initial training in her native city she relocated to London to study at the Guildhall School of Music and Drama.

== Career ==
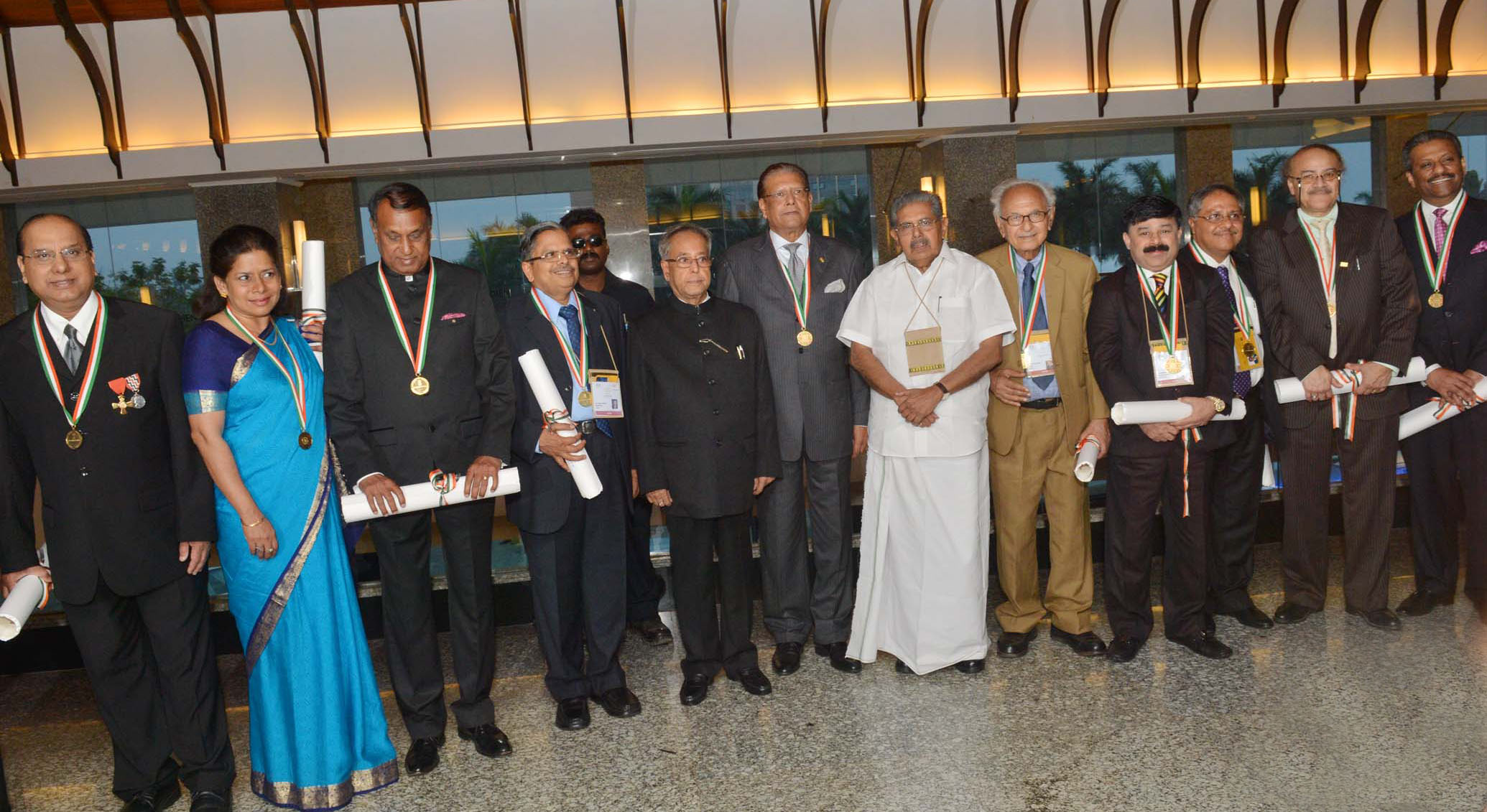
Rozario, other awardees stand with President of India at 11th Pravasi Bharatiya Divas at Kochi in 2013

She has performed at the English National Opera, Opera North, Glyndebourne Festival Opera, and the Garsington Opera in England, and has performed on stage across Europe in Aix-en-Provence, Brussels, Frankfurt, Ghent, Innsbruck, Lyon and Stuttgart.

One of her most notable appearances was across Europe in The Marriage of Figaro, conducted by Sir Georg Solti. She has also given concerts in the Royal Opera House, Covent Garden, and as part of The Proms in England, and abroad in Amsterdam, Athens, Berlin, Halle, Helsinki, Hong Kong, Cologne, Leipzig, Madrid, New York City, Paris, Riga, Rouen, Strasbourg, Vienna, Winterthur and Zürich. She performed in a production of Elvis Costello's Meltdown.

Rozario has made numerous recordings of the works of the composer John Tavener. She was awarded the Order of the British Empire in 2001. Rozario is currently a professor at the Royal College of Music and Trinity Laban where she is a member of the Vocal Faculty.

== Honours ==
In 2013, she was awarded the Pravasi Bharatiya Samman by the President of India, Pranab Mukherjee, in recognition of her "outstanding achievements".
