= Adam del Monte =

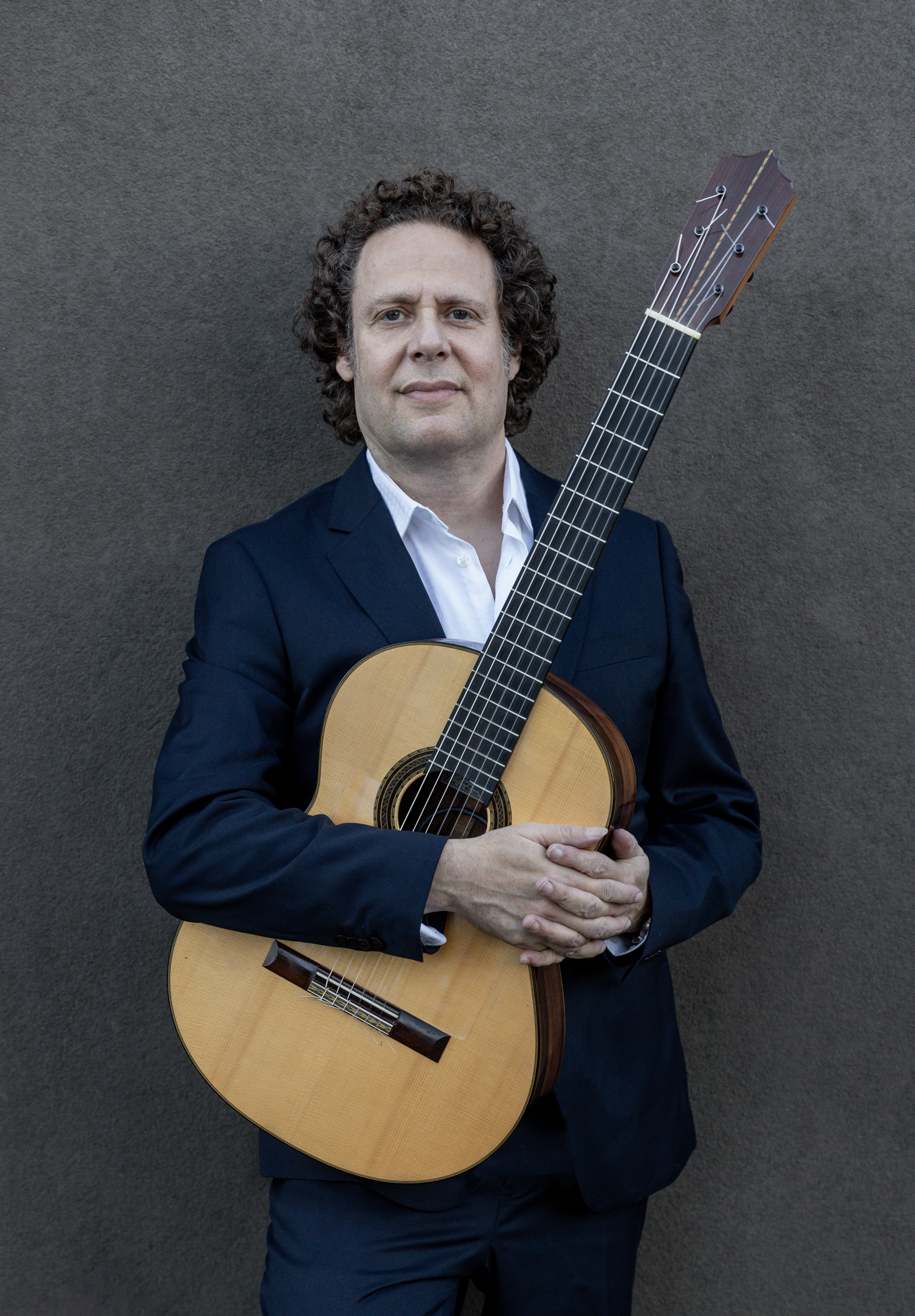
- Adam del Monte

Background information
- Born: 23 September 1966 (age 59); Rehovot, Israel
- Genres: Flamenco, classical music
- Occupations: guitarist, composer, composer and educator
- Instrument: Guitarist

Adam del Monte, born as Adam Kofler, is a guitarist, composer, and educator known for his contributions to flamenco and classical music.

== Biography ==
He was born in Rehovot, near Tel Aviv, Israel, on September 23, 1966. Growing up in Granada, Spain, he had the opportunity to learn the art of flamenco from some of the true maestros of Spain: Pepe Habichuela, Gerardo Núñez and Paco Cortés. He studied flamenco and classical guitar in Spain, Israel and England.

At the age of nineteen, he performed with the flamenco singer Enrique Morente and the Madrid Symphony Orchestra at the Teatro Real in Madrid and the Teatro Manuel de Falla in Granada. In 1997, he won the First Prize at the Stotsenberg International Classical Guitar Competition. The following year, he released his debut CD Viaje a Un Nuevo Mundo, which was highly praised by music critics.

His first flamenco concert called Ensueño Flamenco was premiered on February 12, 1999, at the Jordan Hall in Boston. In February 2000 he performed the Concierto de Aranjuez with the LA Philharmonic. In June 2000, he performed at the Hollywood Bowl, once with his flamenco ensemble and once with the Los Angeles Philharmonic and classical Spanish dancer Lola Greco.

In 2005, he performed Astor Piazzolla's Histoire du Tango with violinist Mark Kashper as part of the Los Angeles Philharmonic Chamber Music Series at Disney Hall. Next year, he performed his concerto for flamenco guitar and the Concierto de Aranjuez in Israel, conducted by Nir Kabaretti.

He has recorded for Deutsche Grammophon, playing the featured flamenco guitar part in the double Grammy Award-winning opera Ainadamar (2006) by Osvaldo Golijov. In this production, he performed alongside soprano Dawn Upshaw and the Atlanta Symphony Orchestra, conducted by Robert Spano. Adam was a member of the Falla Guitar Trio from 2007 to 2012. He performed Ainadamar in the 60th anniversary of the Festival de Granada at the Alhambra Palace with the Granada Symphony Orchestra.

Adam del Monte composed his second flamenco guitar concerto, titled "Paisajes", which was both commissioned and debuted by the St. Monica Symphony. Following its premiere, del Monte has performed the concerto with the Moscow State Symphony at Tchaikovsky Hall and with the Simón Bolívar Symphony Orchestra in Caracas, Venezuela.

He wrote the opera Llantos 1492 as a tribute to his childhood spent in Spain. The flamenco opera Lantos 1492 was performed at the Tucson Desert Song Festival in Tucson on January 30, 2019. During the pandemic, del Monte composed and co-produced a piece for the Virtual Guitar Orchestra titled Relampinos. It involved 117 guitarists from around the world, including Ángel Romero and Eliot Fisk, creating the largest collaboration between flamenco and classical guitarists to date. He had 9 performances of Ainadamar at the Metropolitan Opera House in New York. Together with Slovenian guitarist Mak Grgić, he held numerous concerts in Texas, California, Maryland, Las Vegas and other locations.

Del Monte performed at prestigious venues such as Carnegie Hall and Lincoln Center in New York City, the Barbican Centre in London, the Colorado Music Festival in Boulder, and with the Chicago Symphony Orchestra, among many others. He performed the Concierto de Aranjuez at Disney Hall with the California Philharmonic.

He has a unique style that blends traditional flamenco with contemporary influences, and he often performs both as a solo artist and with various ensembles. In addition to his performing career, del Monte is recognized for his teaching, sharing his expertise in guitar techniques and musical expression. His work has garnered praise in the classical guitar community and beyond. Since 2000, he has been teaching classical and flamenco guitar at the University of Southern California. As a composer and performer, Del Monte has been involved in several film productions.

Del Monte has published his first book on technique and scales development with Mel Bay Publications. The book is called Flamenco Scalathon.

== Discography ==
- Viaja a un Nuevo Mundo (1996)
- Ezordio (1998)
- Ainadamar (2006)
- Excursions (2011)
- Así lo Siento Yo (2010)
- La Buena Vida (2017)
- Transcendence, Kabbalistic Meditation Music by Adam del Monte (2022)

== Composition and film music ==
- Independent Film Soledad, winner of the Hollywood Film Festival Award – Composer and soloist (1998)
- Mr and Mrs. Smith, music by John Powell – Soloist (2005)
- Munich, music by John Williams – Soloist (2005)
- Knight and Day, music by John Powell – Soloist (2010)
- Savages, music by Adam Peters – Sololist (2012)
- Ferdinand the Bull, music by John Powel – Sololist (2017)
