= Andrés Batista =

Spanish flamenco guitarist

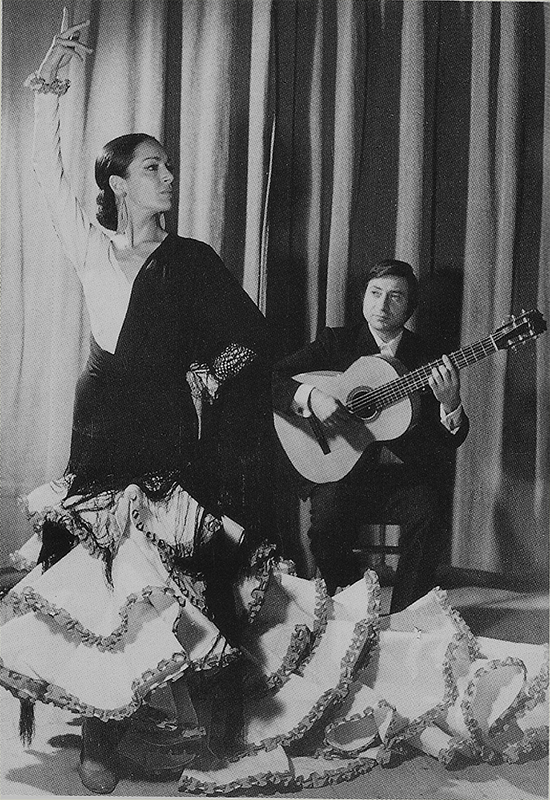
Ana-Mercedes-Andres-Batista.jpg

Andrés Batista Francisco (born 12 October 1937) is a Spanish flamenco guitarist, trained in both classical and flamenco styles.

Batista was born in Barcelona, where he also made his debut. He is widely considered to have both a solid musical and technical background, and a personal style in his interpretations and composition. He is a pioneer in the field of flamenco teaching and has published several books on the subject as well as given courses internationally. His books include Metodo de Guitarra Flamenca (1979), now in its ninth edition, APUNTES FLAMENCOS N. 2 (1982), APUNTES FLAMENCOS N. 3 (1982), Maestros y Estilos. Manuel Flamenco (1985), El flamenco y su vibrante mundo (2003) and Arte flamenco: toque, cante y baile (2008).

Andrés went on a two-year tour of Asia with dancer Queti Clavijo. He established a flamenco academy in Madrid. In 1993 he released the album Paisajes y trilogia. and has played at numerous prestigious venues around the world including Carnegie Hall in May 1977.
