= Juan d'Anyelica =

Spanish jazz flamenco guitarist

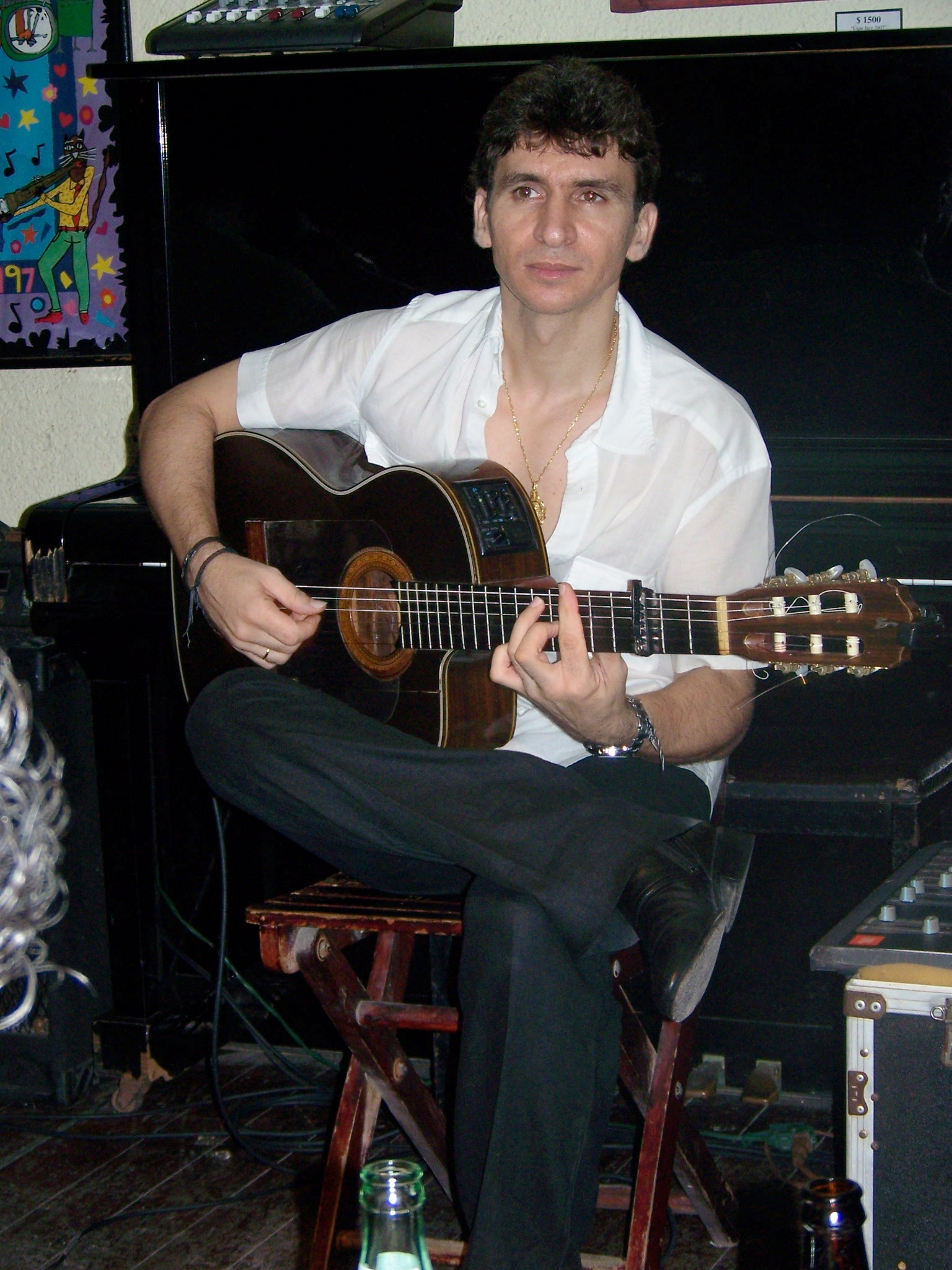
Juan d'Anyelica at Roots Jazz Club in downtown Cancun, March 2008

Juan D Anyelica (born Juan Carmona; Madrid, Spain) is a prominent jazz flamenco guitarist from Spain who plays extensively throughout Mexico. composer, and concert performer who has been based in Cancún and the Riviera Maya since the early 1990s. Descended from the legendary Habichuela dynasty—a seminal family originally from Granada and established in Madrid—he is widely recognized in the Mexican Caribbean scene for his profound mastery of traditional flamenco guitar and his close ties to Paco de Lucía. He is widely considered to be the finest guitarist in Cancun and the state of Quintana Roo. He has played live shows at several locations in Cancun such as Roots Jazz Club, the Grand Oasis and Melia Resorts. He worked with Paco de Lucia on his album Cositas Buenas. And he has won a Latin Grammy Award. He has appeared at the Cancun Jazz Festival.

*Origins, Training, and Artistic Lineage

Early Training and Debut: He grew up steeped in the secrets and foundations of the Habichuela tradition. He began his formal studies in flamenco guitar at age nine and made his professional debut very early, at age twelve, at the Teatro Monumental in Madrid.

First Major Collaborations in Europe: During his formative years and as he established himself in Europe, he shared top-tier stages with historic pillars of the genre such as Fosforito, Paco Cepero, Manolo Sanlúcar, and Lola Flores. He also took part in international tours accompanying renowned cantaores such as Juanito Valderrama and Rafael Farina.

Career in Mexico and Relationship with Paco de Lucía

After traveling to the country to give various performances and go on international tours, he decided to move to Mexico to make it his permanent home in 1992, settling in Cancún, Quintana Roo, and becoming a leading figure in the promotion, performance, and teaching of flamenco in the region.

Beginning in 1996, he developed a close friendship and creative partnership with Paco de Lucía, who also chose Cancún as his personal retreat and place of residence. This closeness extended to the professional and creative spheres:

He played a direct role in Paco de Lucía’s acclaimed album Cositas buenas (2004), collaborating closely on the arrangements and co-composing and performing the iconic rumba “El dengue.”

His exceptional skill as a performer and arranger has earned him solid international recognition, including his participation in Latin Grammy-winning recordings (such as Pepe de Lucía’s album *Un nuevo universo*).

Over the years, he has also collaborated with other major figures in Spanish music, such as Alejandro Sanz.

Recent Projects and Collaboration with Antonio Rey

In 2020, in one of his most notable recording collaborations in recent years, he was invited by the prestigious guitarist Antonio Rey to record one of Rey’s original compositions titled “Frente al mar” on the acclaimed album *Sin Fronteras*, an album conceived as a tribute and homage to the memory of Paco de Lucía.

Style, Legacy, and the Next Generation

Juan D Anyelica’s playing stands out for its finesse, rhythm, elegance, and purity—traits inherited from the Habichuela tradition—masterfully fused with the harmonic openness of the modern school pioneered by Paco de Lucía. Through his concerts, studio recordings, and original compositions, he keeps the heartbeat of classical flamenco alive in Mexico, paying constant homage to his roots and to his dear friend and mentor.

Juan D Anyelica’s performances and original compositions showcase his virtuosity on the guitar and the profound influence of the traditional flamenco school

In addition to his personal projects, he currently plays a key role as a mentor and teacher to his son, Pakito Anyelica:

His Son’s Notable Debut: In 2024, Pakito made his concert debut at the age of 10 at the tenth edition of the Cancún International Music Festival (FIM Cancún), sharing the stage with his father and eight other established guitarists from the region. Current Prospects: At age 12, Pakito is developing tremendous technical skill that amazes even the most established figures in flamenco, masterfully performing complex compositions by Paco de Lucía.
