= Luis Maravilla =

Luis Maravilla (Luis López Tejera) (1 June 1914 – 10 July 2000) was a Flamenco composer. He was born in Seville, Spain.

Maravilla studied guitar under Marcelo Molina and Pepe de Badajoz, and debuted professionally at the age of 12 in the Pavon Theatre of Seville. In the 1930s he toured much of North and South America. The Spanish Civil War brought him to France. Returning to Spain in 1940, he performed with such troupes as Gracia de Triana and Estrellita Castro. Maravilla retired in 1957 to begin teaching.
