= Tadashi Sasaki (musician) =

Classical guitarist

Tadashi Sasaki (born 3 March 1943) is a classical guitarist born in Tokyo, Japan. Today he lives in Germany, where he is a professor at "Hochschule für Musik Köln - Standort Aachen" in Aachen.

In 1968, Tadashi Sasaki was the first Japanese to win the international guitar competition in Paris. He served as a juror in the Heinsberg International Guitar Festival and Competition in 2005.
