= Sabicas =

Spanish Romani flamenco musician (1912–1990)

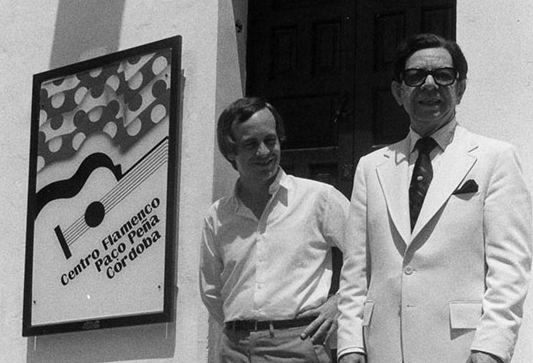
- Paco Peña (left) and Sabicas (right)

Background information
- Born: 16 March 1912
- Origin: Pamplona, Spain
- Died: 14 April 1990 (aged 78)
- Genre: Flamenco rock
- Occupations: Composer; Guitarist
- Instrument: Guitar
- Labels: Elektra Records; MGM Records

Sabicas (proper name: Agustín Castellón Campos) (16 March 1912 – 14 April 1990) was a Spanish flamenco guitarist of Romani origin.

== Biography ==
Sabicas was born in Pamplona, Navarre, Spain. He began playing guitar at the age of five and made his performing debut two years later. His early style was influenced by Ramón Montoya, to whom he was related on his mother's side of the family. Extensive collaboration with important cantaores (male flamenco singers) of the period helped him develop his personal style.

Leaving Spain in 1936 during the Spanish Civil War, he went into exile in Latin America with bailaora (dancer) Carmen Amaya. He lived in Mexico City, married Esperanza González Erazo and had four children of the marriage: Maricruz 1944, Carlos 1946, Agustine 1952 and Margaret 1956. Agustine and Margaret live in New York City, Maricruz is deceased, and Carlos is deceased. Amaya and Sabicas toured together several times. Sabicas later settled in New York City in the United States where he formed a life-long friendship and business association with classical guitarist Rolando Valdés-Blain. He did not return to his native Spain until 1967.

Sabicas was instrumental in the introduction of flamenco to audiences outside of Spain and the Spanish-speaking world. He was probably best known for his technical skills: blazingly fast picados (scales), fast arpeggios, quality composition for the many forms of flamenco, and infallible rhythm, which was critical when playing with a dancer. He was also considered to have perfect pitch. "The finest technique around has got to be Sabicas, the flamenco player," Chet Atkins told Guitar Player in March 1972.

Modern players such as Paco de Lucía, Paco Pena, Tomatito, Serranito, René Heredia, Juan Manuel Cañizares, El Viejín, Vicente Amigo, Gerardo Núñez, Javier Conde and many more acknowledge the influence of Sabicas's music.

Sabicas died at the age of 78 at a hospital in New York, New York, of complications from pneumonia and multiple strokes.

== Discography ==
The following is a partial list of LPs recorded by Sabicas. Some but not all have been reissued on CD or MP3, many under different titles. Some dates are tentative, since many LPs (Decca in particular) did not carry a date (or carried the date of reissue). The many anthologies are not listed.

- 1949 Flamencan Guitar Solos
- 1957 Sabicas Vol. 1 (CD = La Guitarra Flamenca)
- 1957 Sabicas Vol. 2 (CD = La Guitarra Flamenca)
- 1958 Sabicas Vol. 3
- 1958 Gypsy Flamenco
- 1958 The Day of the Bullfight
- 1958 Romantic Guitars (with Mario Escudero. CD = Masters of the Spanish Guitar)
- 1959 Flamenco! (with Carmen Amaya)
- 1959 Queen of the Gypsies (with Carmen Amaya. MP3 = The Best of Carmen Amaya)
- 1959 Flamenco Puro
- 1959 Serenata Andaluza (with group)
- 1959 Solo Flamenco
- 1959 Fantastic Guitars (with Mario Escudero)
- 1960 Festival Gitana (with Los Trianeros)
- 1960 Flamenco Fantasy (CD = Adios a la guitarra. MP3 also available under the original title)
- 1960 Furioso (with Dolores Vargas)
- 1960 Soul of Flamenco
- 1960 Flamenco Variations on Three Guitars
- 1961 Flamenco Virtuoso
- 1961 Rhythms of Spain (with group)
- 1961 Flamenco Styles (with Mario Escudero)
- 1961 El Terremoto Gitano (with Dolores Vargas)
- 1962 Concierto en Flamenco (with orchestra)
- 1963 Flamenco Reflections
- 1963 Flaming Flamenco Guitar
- 1965 El Rey del Flamenco
- 1967 Flamenco Fever
- 1967 Guitars of Passion
- 1968 Artistry in Flamenco
- 1969 3 Guitarras Tiene Sabicas
- 1969 Arte Gitano
- 1969 La Historia del Flamenco (with many singers. CD = Sabicas, RCA ND 74612)
- 1969 La Guitarra de Sabicas
- 1970 Rock Encounter (with Joe Beck) (recorded in 1966)
- 1971 The Soul of Flamenco and the Essence of Rock
- 1972 Flamenco!!
- 1972 ¡¡Olé!! (with Adela la Chaqueta)
- 1972 Sabicas in Concert (CD = Concierto Vol. 2)
- 1972 Fiesta Flamenca (with various old-time singers)
- 1976 The Art of the Guitar
- 1990 Nueva York-Granada (with Enrique Morente)
- 2014 Al compás de mi guitarra (compilation from pre-WWII 78s, with the top singers of the day)
