= Carlos Montoya =

Spanish flamenco musician (1903–1993)

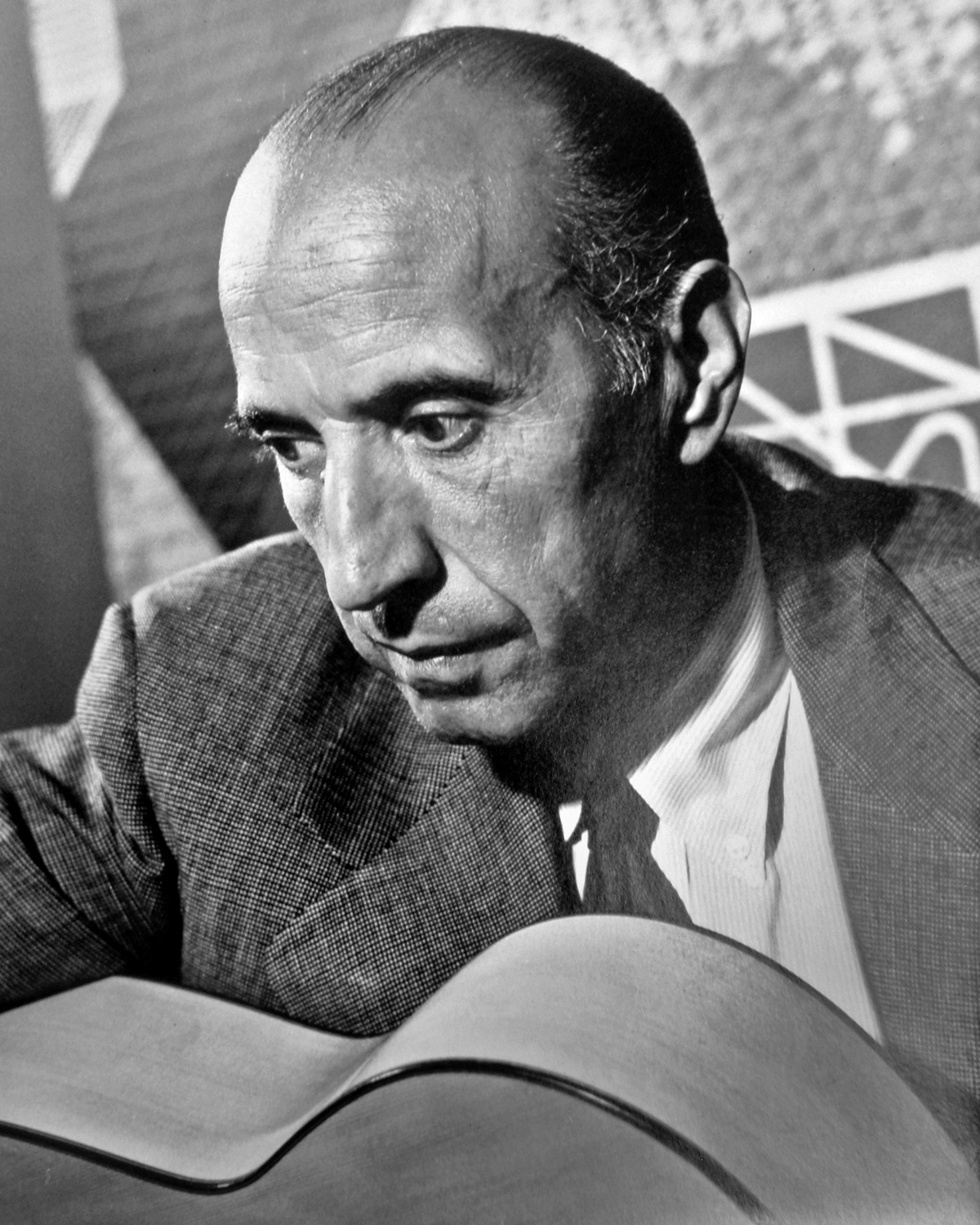
- Montoya circa 1950s

Background information
- Born: Carlos García Montoya; 13 December 1903; Madrid, Spain
- Died: 3 March 1993 (aged 89) Wainscott, New York, U.S.
- Genre: Flamenco music
- Occupations: Composer; Guitarist
- Instrument: Guitar

Carlos García Montoya (13 December 1903 – 3 March 1993) was a flamenco guitarist.

== Early life ==
He was the nephew of flamenco guitarist Ramón Montoya. He first learned from his mother, "la Tula", and then from a neighboring barber, Pepe el Barbero ('Pepe the Barber'). After one year Montoya had completed what Pepe was able to teach him. Carlos left to learn what he could from other flamenco guitarists of the time. At fourteen he was playing in the "cafes cantantes," in the heyday of flamenco singing and dancing, for such artists as Antonio de Bilbao, Juan el Estampío, La Macarrona and La Camisona in Madrid, Spain.

== Career ==
In the 1920s and the 1930s, he performed extensively in Europe, North America, and Asia with the likes of La Teresina. The outbreak of World War II brought him to the United States where he began his most successful days as a musician, bringing his fiery style to concert halls and universities. He also accompanied orchestras. During this period he made a few recordings for several major and independent labels including RCA Victor, ABC-Paramount, Everest and Folkways, performing traditional flamenco music such as Farruca., Malaga and Hokie.

When World War II broke out in Europe in 1939, he was on tour in the United States, and decided to settle in New York City, eventually becoming a U.S. citizen. By the end of the war in 1945, his repertoire had broadened to include blues, jazz and folk music. He again toured internationally, and was the first flamenco guitarist to tour the world with symphonies and orchestras, and dominated the field of flamenco in the U.S. During his career he also performed on television and recorded over forty albums, including Suite Flamenco, a concerto he performed with the Saint Louis Symphony Orchestra in 1966. His performances helped popularize flamenco guitar music worldwide.

Montoya is credited with having transformed flamenco guitar music into a separate music style, beyond being a traditional dance accompaniment. He adapted flamenco to other genres of music to create his own recognizable style, becoming an international star. However, his style was not particularly appreciated by some serious flamenco students, who considered it less traditional than many others. That he was unpopular among aficionados was possibly because he abandoned the compás that had evolved within flamenco over hundreds of years. Many of his works do not even keep perfect tempo, increasing and decreasing in speed almost whimsically. He was admired for the speed of his picados and found popularity on the international stage as a result of this technically impressive pace.

== Death and legacy ==
Montoya died on 3 March 1993 at the age of 89 of heart failure in Wainscott, New York, on Long Island. His niece, Rosa Montoya, is noted for introducing flamenco dance to most of California with her studio based in San Francisco.

== Discography ==
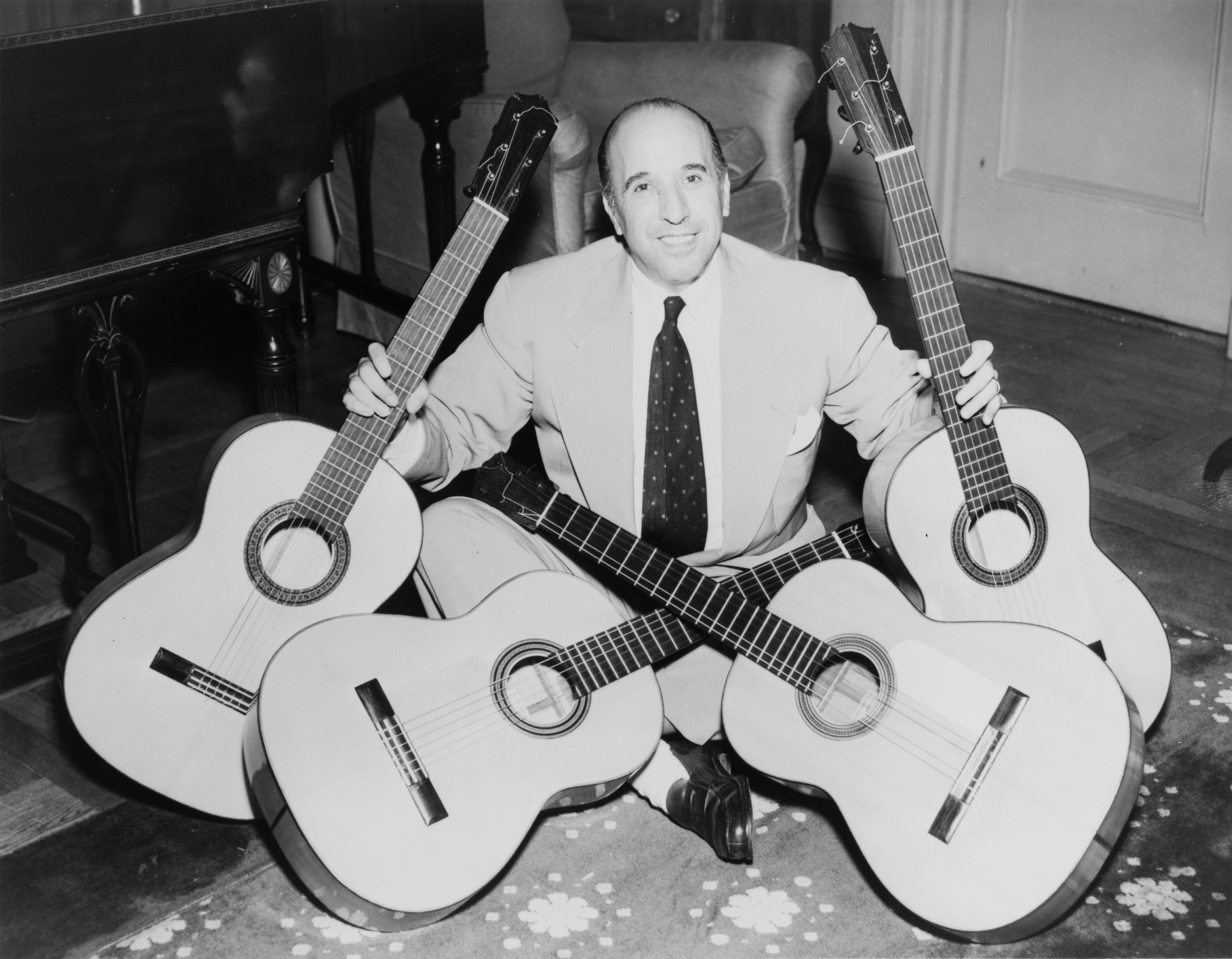

| Year | Album title |
|---|---|
| 1950 | Spanish Guitar Solos |
| 1957 | Flamenco Guitar |
| 1958 | Carlos Montoya and His Flamenco Guitar |
| 1958 | Carlos Montoya Guitar Recital |
| 1958 | Flamenco Fire |
| 1959 | From St. Louis to Seville |
| .1960. | Carlos Montoya |
| 1961 | Malagueña |
| 1963 | Flamenco Antiguo |
| 1964 | Flamenco Concert |
| 1967 | The Artistry Of Carlos Montoya |
| 1996 | Flamenco! |
| 2004 | Guitar & Flamenco |

== Filmography ==
- Carmen, la de Triana (1938)
