= Paco Peña =

Spanish flamenco composer and guitarist (born 1942)

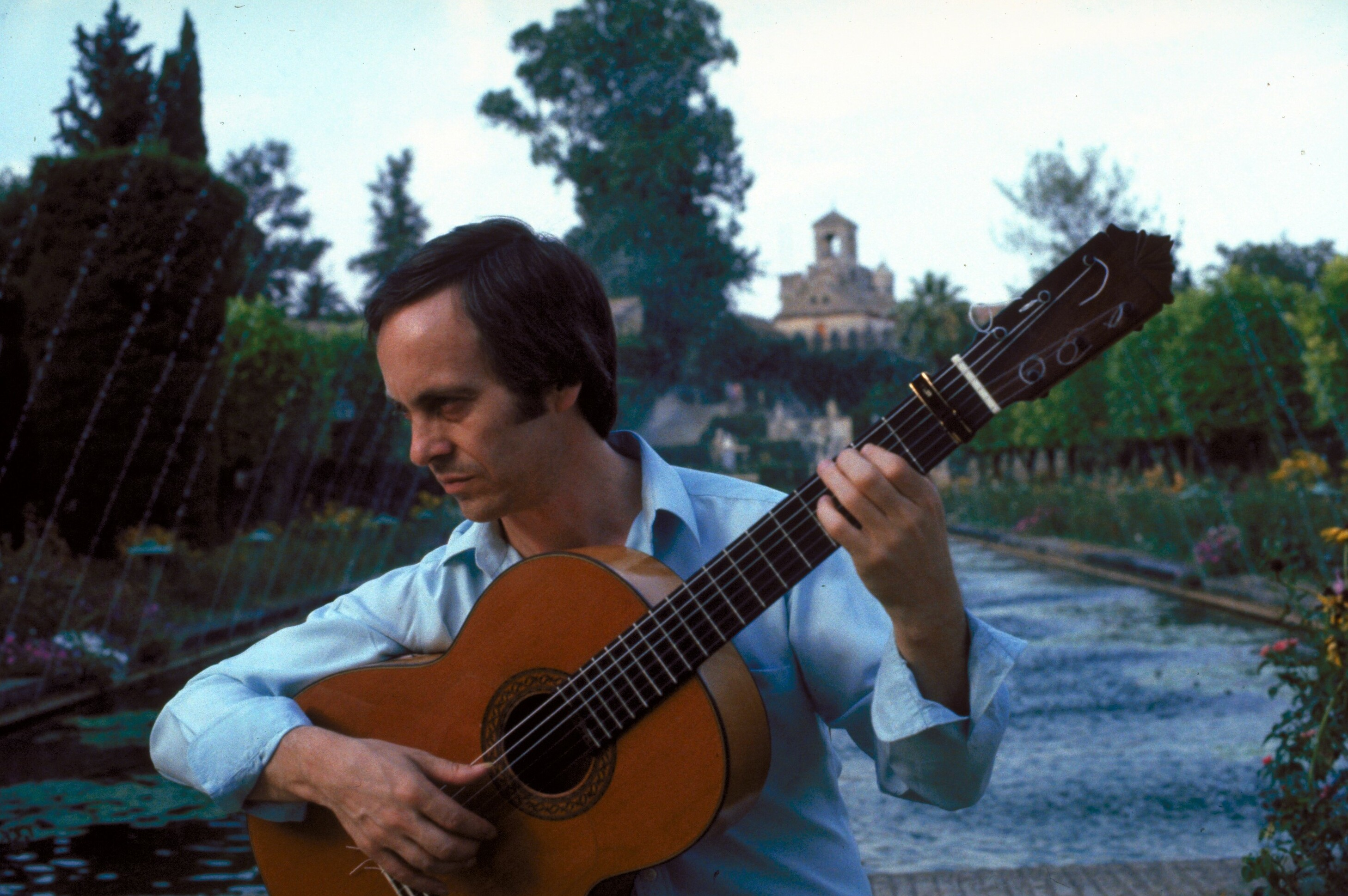
- Peña in the Alcázar de los Reyes Cristianos, Córdoba

Background information
- Born: Francisco Peña Pérez; 1 June 1942 (age 84); Córdoba, Spain
- Genres: Flamenco; Instrumental music
- Occupations: Composer; Guitarist
- Instrument: Guitar
- Years active: 1967–present
- Label: Nimbus Records
- Website: PacoPena.net

Francisco Peña Pérez (born 1 June 1942), known as Paco Peña, is a Spanish flamenco composer and guitarist. He is regarded as one of the world's foremost traditional flamenco players.

== Biography ==
Born on 1 June 1942 in Córdoba, Spain, as Francisco Peña Pérez, Paco Peña began learning to play the guitar from his brother at the age of six and made his first professional appearance aged 12. Encouraged by his family, he left home and began performing throughout Spain as part of a government-sponsored folk music and dance program. This led to calls from professional flamenco companies in Madrid and the Costa Brava, where Peña established himself as a highly regarded accompanist to flamenco dance and singing. However, dissatisfied with life on the coast and seeking a new challenge, he moved to London in the late 1960s to become a soloist.

Initially the star attraction at the Restaurante Antonio in Covent Garden, Peña generated so much interest among the British public previously uninitiated in flamenco that he soon found himself sharing concerts with artists such as Jimi Hendrix, and made his solo debut at Wigmore Hall in 1967. It was not long before Peña was touring the world, both as a soloist and an accompanist with performances at Carnegie Hall in New York City, the Royal Albert Hall in London and the Concertgebouw in Amsterdam. He later founded the world's first university course on flamenco guitar, at the Rotterdam conservatory of music. In 1984, Peña was interviewed by Julian Bream for the Channel 4 television series Guitarra!, which traces the development of the guitar in Spain.

Peña also created the Centro Flamenco Paco Peña in Córdoba, and was responsible for the founding of the now-celebrated annual Córdoba Guitar Festival, which has seen appearances by other flamenco greats such as Manolo Sanlúcar and Paco de Lucía.

In 1997, Peña was named Oficial de la Cruz de la Orden del Mérito Civil by King Juan Carlos of Spain.

His most famous compositions include his Misa Flamenca (a flamenco Mass), and Requiem for the Earth, both of which have received great critical acclaim.

He has also had a number of notable collaborations, significantly with the Argentinian guitarist Eduardo Falú and the Chilean group Inti-Illimani.

Peña has homes in London and Córdoba. Recent shows include Flamenco Sin Fronteras, which explores the relationship between Venezuelan music and flamenco; and Quimeras, which features the Paco Peña Flamenco Dance Company performing a story about immigrants from Africa arriving in Andalusia.

Peña has collaborated with the classical guitarist John Williams. Peña also provided the chapter on flamenco guitar for the book The Guitar (A Guide For Students And Teachers).

== Discography ==
CD

- 1987: Fragments of a Dream (Inti-Illimani with John Williams)
- 1987: Flamenco Guitar Music of Ramón Montoya and Niño Ricardo
- 1988: Azahara
- 1990: Leyenda (live in Cologne Inti-Illimani with John Williams)
- 1991: Misa Flamenca
- 1992: Encuentro (with Eduardo Falú)
- 1995: The Art of Paco Peña (anthology)
- 1999: Arte y Pasión (live, with Company)
- 2000: Flamenco Guitar (Montoya/Ricardo & Azahara)
- 2003: Flamenco Master: Essential flamenco recordings (anthology)
- 2004: Fabulous Flamenco / La Gitarra Flamenca (remastered)
- 2007: His Essential Recordings (anthology)
- 2007: A Flamenco Guitar Recital (live)
- 2007: Requiem for the Earth
- 2008: A Compás! (Live, with Company)
- 2014: Duo Recital (with Eliot Fisk)
- 2015: En estado de gracia
- 2018: Con la Verdad por Delante

LP

- 1966: Flamenco! (El Sali & his Ballet Espagnol)
- 1968: The Incredible Paco Peña
- 1969: Carnival (with Los Marachuchos)
- 1970: Flamenco
- 1970: The Art of Flamenco (with Company)
- 1972: Flamenco Puro Live (with Company)
- 1973: The Art of the Flamenco Guitar
- 1975: Fabulous Flamenco!
- 1976: Toques Flamencos (Student pieces, with book)
- 1977: La Gitarra Flamenca [sic]
- 1978: The Flamenco World of Paco Peña
- 1979: Live in London
- 1980: Live at Sadler's Wells (with Company)
- 1985: Flamenco Vivo (live)

DVD

- 1985: Guitarra! (Julian Bream) [guest appearance]
- 1991: Misa Flamenca
