= Screen Time (TV series) =

Australian television series

Screen Time was a 30-minute Australian television panel show which screened from October to December 2017 on the ABC Television network, a total of 10 episodes.

== Overview ==
Screen Time commenced screening on the ABC TV on 17 October 2017 at 8:00pm. It was hosted by Chris Taylor and featured a panel of rotating guests who discussed film, television, and online content. Panellists included: Sophie Black, Marc Fennell, Benjamin Law, Judith Lucy, Nakkiah Lui, Zan Rowe, Sami Shah, Michael Williams , and Susie Youssef.

Ten episodes were screened in a single series, the last one showing on 18 December 2017.

== Episode 1: Tuesday 17 Oct 2017 ==
- Panellists (r to l): Sami Shah, Sophie Black, Chris Taylor (host), Zan Rowe, Benjamin Law

=== Topics ===
- Content is King: Cinema movies, Netflix, Stan, Amazon, ABC iview, SBS On Demand, Foxtel, Tenplay, Freeview, YouTube, Vimeo, Facebook, Snapchat
- Denis Villeneuve's (Dennis Newtown's) Bladerunner 2049, Bechdel test
- Addiction to making sequels
- Sophie Monk 'Jane Austen' parody
- Females in Broad City / Girls / Sex and the City / Golden Girls / Seinfeld
- Take 5 Countdown segment: Weirdest Sex scenes

=== Recommendations ===
- Sami Shah: The Expanse on Netflix
- Benjamin Law: Ali's Wedding in cinemas
- Zan Rowe: Japanese reality show Terrace House on Netflix
- Sophie Black: Tiny Kitchen on YouTube

== Episode 2: Tuesday 24 Oct 2017 ==
- Panellists (r to l): Sami Shah, Sophie Black, Chris Taylor (host), Judith Lucy, Michael Williams

=== Topics ===
- Harvey Weinstein sexual abuse allegations
- Good Time (film) starring Robert Pattinson
- Prolonging a teen idol's career - Viggo Mortensen, Orlando Bloom
- Not On My Watch segment: Channel Seven's Cosmetic Coffee
- David Simon's The Deuce starring James Franco and Maggie Gyllenhaal on Foxtel
- The Wire, Treme, Homicide: Life on the Street
- Take 5 Countdown segment: Double Trouble, actors who shouldn't take on more than one role in a scene

=== Recommendations ===
- Michael Williams: SBS's drama Sunshine
- Sami Shah: Patton Oswalt's comedy special 'Annihilation'
- Sophie Black: ABC's Get Krack!n with Kate McLennan and Kate McCartney
- Judith Lucy: I Love Dick series created by Joey Soloway and Sarah Gubbins

== Episode 3: Tuesday 31 Oct 2017 ==
- Panellists (r to l): Sami Shah, Sophie Black, Chris Taylor (host), Judith Lucy, Marc Fennell

=== Topics ===
- The Bachelorette with Sophie Monk
- Thor: Ragnarok directed by Taika Waititi and starring Chris Hemsworth
- Growth of Marvel Universe franchise
- Take 5 Countdown segment: Marvel's least convincing superheroes
- Larry David's Curb Your Enthusiasm and its music theme

=== Recommendations ===
- Marc Fennell: The Good Place on Netflix
- Sami Shah: 'Active Shooter' on Stan
- Judith Lucy: Anne Edmond's 'Edge of the Bush' on ABC iView
- Sophie Black: British comedy Chewing Gum on Netflix
- Chris Taylor: classic Spartacus (film)

== Episode 4: Tuesday 07 Nov 2017 ==
- Panellists (r to l): Michael Williams, Susie Youssef, Chris Taylor (host), Nakkiah Lui, Marc Fennell

=== Topics ===
- Sci-Fi horror series Stranger Things 2 on Netflix
- Not On My Watch segment: Channel Seven's The Wall
- Australian romcom movie Three Summers directed by Ben Elton
- Australian ockers in film since 1970s
- Take 5 Countdown segment: Worst musical moments in movies

=== Recommendations ===
- Susie Youssef: Master of None (season 2) on Netflix
- Michael Williams: British series Back on ABC iView
- Nakkiah Liu: Mindhunter (season 1) on Netflix
- Marc Fennell: 'Borders' on vox.com

== Episode 5: Tuesday 14 Nov 2017 ==
- Panellists (r to l): Sami Shah, Zan Rowe, Chris Taylor (host), Judith Lucy, Benjamin Law

=== Topics ===
- Kathryn Bigelow's new civil rights drama Detroit, police brutality & racism in the USA
- Katryn Bigelow's career: The Hurt Locker
- Not on My Watch: Instant Hotel reality show on Seven
- Norwegian phenomenon 'Slow TV'

=== Recommendations ===
- Judith Lucy: Quarry on iTunes
- Sami Shah: Binging with Babish (making movie recipes) on YouTube
- Zan Rowe: Joan Didion: The Center Will Not Hold on Netflix
- Benjamin Law: 2017 Thai film Bad Genius in selected cinema
- Chris Taylor: Slow TV suggestions

== Episode 6: Tuesday 21 Nov 2017 ==
- Panellists: Chris Taylor (host), Judith Lucy, Sami Shah, Sophie Black, Benjamin Law

=== Topics ===
- Nicole Kidman's career, The Killing of a Sacred Deer
- Transparent

== Episode 7: Tuesday 28 Nov 2017 ==
- Panellists (r to l): Benjamin Law, Zan Rowe, Chris Taylor (host), Nakkiah Lui, Marc Fennell

=== Topics ===
- Buses blocking Demolition videos
- Murder on the Orient Express (2017 film) directed by Kenneth Branagh
- Gogglebox (season 6), raising social issues & diversity
- Imaginary 'Googlebox' review of 'Screen Time'

=== Recommendations ===
- Marc Fennell: Star Trek: Discovery on Netflix
- Zan Rowe: Brisbane Band 'The Go-Betweens: Right Here' documentary on ABC iView
- Benjamin Law: Will & Grace relaunched on Stan
- 2017 She's Gotta Have It (TV series) directed by Spike Lee on Netflix

== Episode 8: Tuesday 5 Dec 2017 ==
- Panellists (r to l): Susie Youssef, Sophie Black, Chris Taylor (host), Zan Rowe, Marc Fennell

=== Topics ===
- Replacing Kevin Spacey with Christopher Plummer in All the Money in the World directed by Ridley Scott
- Friday on my Mind about The Easybeats on ABC iView, importance of good casting
- Popularity of Australian biopics: The Dismissal (miniseries), Bodyline (miniseries), Paper Giants, Howzat! Kerry Packer's War, Peter Allen: Not the Boy Next Door, INXS: Never Tear Us Apart, Schapelle (TV film), House of Hancock, Molly (miniseries), Hoges: The Paul Hogan Story, The Queen
- The Meyerowitz Stories directed by Noah Baubach, starring Dustin Hoffman on Netflix
- Adam Sandler's career, Ben Stiller

=== Recommendations ===
- Susie Youssef: The Crown (TV series) (season 1) on Netflix
- Sophie Black: You Can't Ask That on ABC iView
- Zan Rowe: Veep (season 6) on Foxtel Now
- Marc Fennell: Crazy Ex-Girlfriend (TV series) on Netflix
