= Kobold (disambiguation) =

In Germanic folklore, the kobold is a sprite.

Kobold may also refer to:

== Arts and entertainment ==
- Kobold (Dungeons & Dragons), a fictional reptilian humanoid species
- Kobold Quarterly, an American roleplaying magazine (2007–2012)
- Kobold, an elven character in the Shannara novels (1977–2020)

== Other uses ==
- Kobold (vacuum cleaner), a German brand (since 1930)
- Hermann Kobold (1858–1942), German astronomer

== See also ==
- Kobolds Ate My Baby!, a role-playing game (first published 1999)
- Kobald (disambiguation)
