= Entre dos aguas =

Entre dos aguas may refer to:

- Entre dos aguas (album), an album by Paco de Lucía
- "Entre dos aguas" (song), an instrumental by Paco de Lucía
- Entre dos aguas (film), a film by Isaki Lacuesta
