= Screen time (disambiguation) =

Screen time is the amount of time electronic devices are used.

Screen time, Screentime or Screen Time may also refer to:

- Screen Time, an iOS and macOS feature that tracks how long devices are used
- Screentime, an Australian-based television production company
- Screen Time (TV series), an Australian TV series
- Screen Time (album), an instrumental album by Thurston Moore
