= Kit Denton Fellowship =

Australian literary award

The Kit Denton Fellowship, later Kit Denton Disfellowship, is an Australian literary award presented at the AWGIE Awards by the Australian Writers' Guild (AWG) between 2007 and 2012.

The award was named after Kit Denton, a lifetime member of the AWG, well known as a scriptwriter, author, poet and lyricist. He wrote the international best selling novel, The Breaker, about the life and death of Breaker Morant. Kit Denton was the father of TV personality, Andrew Denton.

The Kit Denton Fellowship was presented to a writer who shows courage and excellence in performance writing. The award was worth A$25,000, to support the recipient in their writing work and assist them in developing a marketable script.

In 2011, the fellowship was relaunched as the Kit Denton Disfellowship, funded by the Australian Writers Foundation and Andrew Denton's company Zapruder's Other Films to the tune of $30,000.

== Award winners ==
- 2007 – Ian David, script writer
- 2008 – Suzie Miller, playwright
- 2009 – Back to Back Theatre, a theatre company from Geelong, Victoria
- 2010 – George Catsi, writer / performer
- 2011 – Kate McLennan and Kate McCartney for their project, Bleak
- 2012 – Angela Betzien for her script War Games
