= Sami Shah =

Pakistan-born Australian comedian

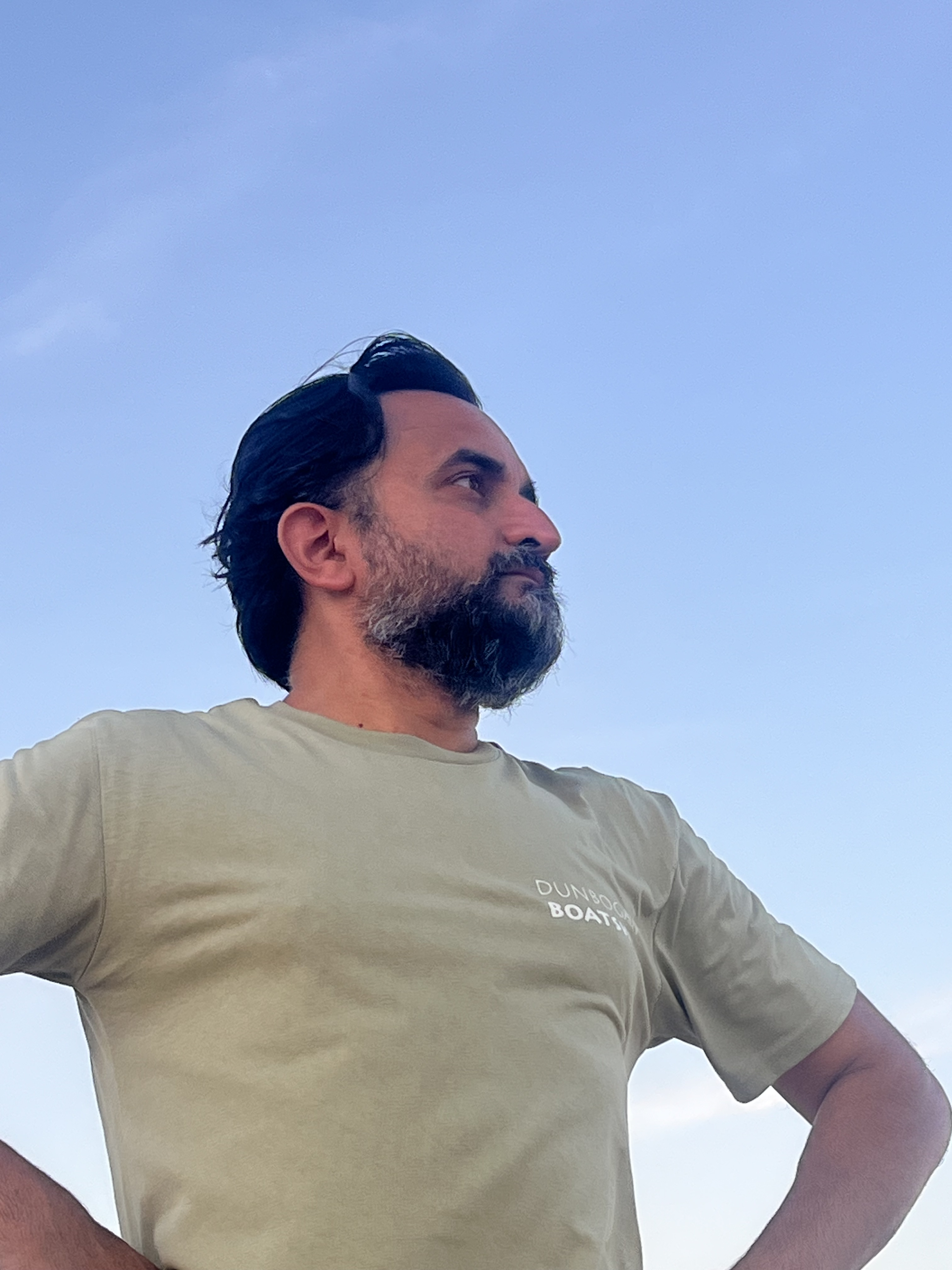
- Born: Pakistan
- Education: University of Virginia
- Employer: Australian Broadcasting Corporation
- Notable work: Laughing Dead (2016 podcast); I, Migrant (2014 memoir); The Islamic Republic of Australia (2016–7 book & radio series)

Comedy career
- Years active: 2003–present
- Medium: Stand-up, radio, television, and written comedy; serious podcasts
- Genres: Improvisational, satire, observational comedy
- Subjects: Racism, religion, Islam, culture, comedy

Sami Shah is a Pakistani-Australian stand-up comedian, writer, improvisational actor, and radio presenter. Shah was a member of the improvisational comedy group "BlackFish" created by Saad Haroon in 2002, and later performed the first solo English-language comedy show in Pakistan. He had several tours across Pakistan. He moved to Australia in 2012, and has since hosted several podcasts and shows on ABC radio as well as written several books, performed in comedy festivals and created podcasts. He has appeared on television in Australia, Pakistan, and the United Kingdom.

== Early life and education ==
Sami Shah was born in Pakistan to a moderate Shia family.

He studied English at the University of Virginia in the United States.

== Career in Pakistan ==
=== Stand-up ===
Shah joined BlackFish, a comedy troupe created by Saad Haroon, in 2003. The group of eight comics employed improvisational theatre as well as scripts, using a repertoire of characters created by each of them and performing 50 times in 2003. In 2004 they performed in the UK, representing Pakistan as part of a British Council "Connecting Futures Project". Shah co-wrote We’ve Made Contact, a half-improvised half-scripted original format play for the performance in Manchester. He remained an active member until the troupe disbanded in 2006.

Shah performed his first solo show in Karachi on 13 November 2005. Entitled "Nobody Moves, Nobody Gets Hurt", it raised funds for victims of the 2005 earthquake. In 2006, he toured Pakistan with fellow comics Haroon and Danish Ali, in what came to be called the 3-4-5 Tour. His 2007 solo Karachi show spared nobody, aiming at mullahs, Pakistani culture, advertising agencies, local and international politics and various groups of people.

In 2008, Shah hosted, wrote, produced and directed a news satire television show, News Weakly. It ran for two seasons on the 24-hour news channel Dawn News and won acclaim both locally and internationally.

He later said that the government's strict blasphemy laws, under which the death penalty could be imposed, affected the content of his performances. Having been accused of blasphemy by an audience member after his first stand-up gig, he never again mentioned religion while performing in Pakistan.

=== Writing ===
Shah wrote for Pakistani magazines and was a columnist for The Express Tribune in 2012. His regular contributions as a music critic resulted in him being a judge for the prestigious Lux Style Awards in 2006.

== Career in Australia ==
=== Stand-up ===
When in Western Australia, Shah travelled around the state doing comedy gigs, and he later made a name for himself poking fun at his adopted town at the biggest comedy festivals in the country.

In 2013, he won Best Local Act at the Perth International Comedy Festival; in 2016, he won Best Comedy WA 2016 Fringe World. He appeared at the 2019 Melbourne International Comedy Festival.

=== Writing ===
In July 2014, he published an autobiography entitled I, Migrant: A Comedian's Journey from Karachi to the Outback, which was shortlisted for the 2015 New South Wales Premier's Literary Awards NSW Multicultural Award as well as the Russell Prize for Humour Writing.

In 2016, he published his first foray into young adult fiction, Fire Boy. Its sequel, Earth Boy, was released in 2017.

In July 2017, The Islamic Republic of Australia was published. It seeks to dispel the myth that there is a single monolithic entity representing a typical Muslim in Australia, and attempts to describe the many types of Muslims, who differ in nationality of origin, the type of Islam they practise and individual personalities. He talked to academics, Islamic leaders and public figures when researching the book. Written in a humorous style, it has chapters named "How to blaspheme" and "Apostates are people too".

=== Radio / podcast ===
In 2015, Shah wrote and presented a two-episode series for BBC Radio 4, entitled "Sami Shah's Beginner's Guide to Pakistan", examining Pakistan's political history.

In July–August 2016, Shah wrote and presented a five-part series for ABC Radio National (RN) called "The Islamic Republic of Australia", examining the role of Islam in contemporary Australia. In it, he discussed topics like radicalisation, free speech and the hijab with moderate Muslims, Islamic preachers, ex-Muslims, and Islamophobes. In 2017, Richard Fidler presented a four-part "bonus" series on his Conversations program.

In July 2016, Shah became the ABC Radio Melbourne field and social media reporter.

As part of the ABC "First Run" initiative to produce comedy podcast programs, Shah was commissioned to host a new show called Laughing Dead, in which he invited comedians to talk about their worst performance experience. Notable guests on the show included Maz Jobrani, Andy Kindler, Claire Hooper, Alexei Sayle, and Luke McGregor. The program was produced and edited by Courtney Carthy and broadcast from 5 October 2016.

In December 2017, Shah was announced as a co-host of Breakfast with Jacinta Parsons on ABC Radio Melbourne, replacing Red Symons.

In April 2019, as part of ABC RN's Earshot program, Shah presented the series Shutup: A free speech investigation, in which he investigates the concept and practice of all aspects of free speech in Australia and explores the nature of a double standard. In one episode, he speaks of the fear he felt of a possible fatwa being issued against him as an apostate, or being pursued by extremist ISIS supporters, likening it to fear felt by certain individuals in minority groups in Australia who have been hounded in the media by right-wing commentators and politicians and on social media by internet trolls, or even persecuted by death threats. Citing the case of Yassmin Abdel-Magied, he says that most people of colour and Muslims in the public eye have either had experience of, or a fear of "getting Yassmined", and that women in general experience this more than men. In two bonus episodes, he talks to conservative commentator Andrew Bolt and lawyer and anti-racism advocate Nyadol Nyuon.

The Audible original crime noir podcast The Missed, written by Shah, was released in August 2022. Starring Indian Australian Bollywood star Pallavi Sharda along with Igor Sas, Della Rae Morrison, and Summer Williams, the story follows a refugee family from Pakistan move to a quiet town in Western Australia, whose daughter goes missing.

=== TV ===
In 2015, Shah appeared on the BBC Two TV panel show QI, in episode 3 (M-places) and in the compilation episode 18.

In September 2017, he appeared in season 1, episode 2 of Australian comedy show Get Krack!n on ABC TV.

From October 2017, Shah was a regular panellist on the Australian TV show Screen Time on ABC TV, discussing film, television and online content.

== Other activities ==
Shah was on the jury for music nominations on the Pakistan Lux Style Awards Television Special in 2006 and 2007, and as host in 2010.

In January 2014, Shah gave a talk at TedX in Melbourne entitled "The Unseen Laugh", in which he talks about some of his experiences in Pakistan and Western Australia, Australian attitudes towards asylum seekers, and using comedy to change people's perspectives.

In November 2019, Shah was a presenter and participant in panel discussions at "JLF in Adelaide", the first time that the Jaipur Literature Festival had been presented in Australia. It was part of OzAsia, a cultural festival held in Adelaide. In 2025, Shah hosted the new literary and ideas component of OzAsia, called Weekend of Words, held from 7 to 9 November..

== Personal life ==
Living in the US after studying there, after the September 11 attacks in 2001 Shah was drawn into Islam, partly as a reaction to its persecution and also because of his opposition to the invasion of Iraq. He moved back to Pakistan in 2002 and gradually rejected all religion and openly embraced atheism.

Shah and his wife, psychologist Ishma Alvi, moved to Australia with their young daughter in 2012, partly because of the lack of freedom allowed to women and girls in Pakistan. After spending some years in the small town of Northam, Western Australia they moved to Melbourne in 2015. They became Australian citizens in January 2017. The couple divorced in 2017.

In 2019, Shah remarried, although the second marriage only lasted a few months.

In 2023, Shah and his partner, Kylie Moore-Gilbert, had a daughter, Leah. In October 2023, the family was the subject of an episode of the ABC Television program Australian Story.

Although an atheist, Shah has self-identified as a "cultural Muslim", saying that it's part of his background and he loves it. He also describes himself as a "serial blasphemer", and embraces the freedom he has in Australia "to talk openly about the major issues that need to be addressed in Islam".

== Works ==
- I, Migrant: A comedian's journey from Karachi to the outback. Allen & Unwin. 1 August 2014. ISBN 9781743437322.
- Fire Boy. Xoum Publishing (Fantastica). 2016. ISBN 9781925143102. OCLC 948669994.
- Earth Boy. Xoum Publishing (Fantastica). 2017. ISBN 9781925143591. OCLC 981711070.
- The Islamic Republic of Australia. Harper Collins (ABC Books). 19 June 2017. ISBN 9781460708071.

== See also ==
- List of Lollywood actors

== Further reading & viewing ==
- Hasan, Ayesha (11 January 2019). "Sami Shah opens up about being an atheist Pakistani-Australian comedian" (audio). SBS. (15 min.)
- Sami Shah on YouTube
