= The Katering Show =

2015 Australian TV series

- Genre: Cooking show; Comedy
- Created by: Kate McCartney; Kate McLennan
- Written by: Kate McCartney; Kate McLennan
- Directed by: Kate McCartney; Kate McLennan; Cameron Ford
- Starring: Kate McCartney; Kate McLennan
- Country of origin: Australia
- Original language: English
- No. of seasons: 2
- No. of episodes: 14

Production
- Executive producers: Kate McCartney; Kate McLennan; Rick Kalowski; Brett Sleigh; Kevin Whyte
- Running time: 7–12 minutes

Original release
- Release: 10 February 2015 – 2016

Related
- Get Krack!n

The Katering Show is an Australian comedy series. It is a parody of cooking shows and current food trends. It stars Australian comedians Kate McCartney and Kate McLennan. It is "the journey of a food intolerant (McCartney) and an intolerable foodie (McLennan)".

== Episodes ==
=== Season 1 ===
Season 1 was released direct to YouTube via the Lead Balloon TV channel commencing in February 2015. Episode 4, which parodies the Thermomix kitchen implement, has had over 3.35 million views (as of October 2026).

- Episode 1 – Mexicana Festiana
- Episode 2 – Ethical Eating
- Episode 3 – We Quit Sugar
- Episode 4 – Thermomix
- Episode 5 – Food Porn
- Episode 6 – Christmas

=== Season 2 ===
Season 2 (marketed as Seasoning 2) was picked up by the Australian Broadcasting Corporation (ABC) and a season of 8 episodes was developed to be released through the ABC iview video on demand platform in April 2016. ABC half-funded production for season 2. The episodes were broadcast on free-to-air television.

- Episode 1 – Red Ramen
- Episode 2 – Yummy Mummies
- Episode 3 – It Gets Feta
- Episode 4 – The Body Issue
- Episode 5 – The Cook and The Kates
- Episode 6 – Tying the Not
- Episode 7 – Chienging Flavours (guest starring Ronny Chieng)
- Episode 8 – End of Days

== See also ==
- Get Krack!n, a later series by the pair.
