= Dreaming Award =

Australian art awards

- Awarded for: supporting an inspirational young artist aged 18-26 years in creating a major body of work through mentoring and partnerships
- Country: Australia
- Presented by: Australia Council for the Arts
- Reward: $20,000
- First award: 2012; 14 years ago
- Website: National Indigenous Arts Awards

The Dreaming Awards are Australian art awards for emerging Indigenous Australian artists, as part of the National Indigenous Arts Awards awarded annually.

== Background and description ==
The Dreaming Award was established in 2012 by the Australia Council for the Arts "to support an inspirational young artist aged 18-26 years to create a major body of work through mentoring and partnerships. The mentor/partner will be another established professional artist or arts institution nominated by the artist".

As of 2022 the Dreaming Award is one of four categories awarded at the First Nations Arts Awards (formerly National Indigenous Arts Awards) on 27 May each year, on the anniversary of the 1967 referendum. The major award is the Red Ochre Award for lifetime achievement.

== Recipients ==
- Phoebe Grainer (2023)
- Naarah Barnes (2023)
- Brittanie Shipway (2022)
- Jazz Money (2022)
- Tasman Keith (2021)
- Thea Anamara Perkins (2020)
- Jena Lee (2019)
- Thomas E.S. Kelly (2018)
- Teila Watson (2017)
- Corey ‘Nooky’ Webster (2016)
- Kahl Wallis (2015)
- Tyrone Sheather (2014)
- Rhonda Unrupa Dick (2013)
- Nakkiah Lui (2012)
