= Michelle Davidson (actress) =

Australian actress (born 1987)

- Born: Michelle Lim; July 23, 1987 (age 38); South Korea
- Occupation: Actress
- Years active: 2011–present
- Known for: Play School; The Newsreader

Michelle Lim Davidson (born 23 July 1987) is an Australian actress. She got her break in television starring on the skit show Ben Elton Live from Planet Earth in 2011. From 2012, she was a presenter on Play School, a long running Australian TV show and its spin off, Big Ted's Big Adventure. She also played the role of Amy in two seasons of the critically acclaimed comedy series Utopia. Davidson has also had roles in television series Doctor Doctor, Get Krack!n, The Newsreader and Top of the Lake China Girl. In 2022, she appeared in After the Verdict.

Davidson made her stage writing debut with Koreaboo, a Griffin Theatre Company play about Korean-Australian adoptee Hannah travelling to Korea to reconnect with her birth mother that ran from 14 June to 20 July at the Belvoir St Theatre in 2025. Davidson starred as Hannah in Koreaboo alongside Heather Jeong (as Umma). Griffin Theatre Company says the play takes "inspiration from real events of Michelle Lim Davidson‘s life".

Born in South Korea, Davidson was adopted by Australian parents when she was four months old and grew up in Newcastle. She attended the Hunter School of Performing Arts and the Western Australian Academy of Performing Arts.

== Filmography ==
Year	Title	Role	Notes	Ref.
2025	Return to Paradise	Susie Huen	Guest: TV series	
2021–25	The Newsreader	Noelene Kim	18 episodes	
2022	After the Verdict	Clara	6 episodes	
2021	Harrow	Izzy Young	1 episode	
2020	The Secrets She Keeps	Rani	1 episode	
2017–19	Get Krack!n	Penny Kwan	5 episodes	
2017	Beyond the Bubble	Sarah	Short	
2017	Top of the Lake	Linda	1 episode	
2016	Doctor Doctor	Becky	2 episodes	
2016	Goldstone	May		
2014–15	Utopia	Amy	16 episodes	
2011	Ben Elton Live	Ensemble	3 episodes	

Writer
Year	Title	Role	Notes	Ref.
2021	Born to Spy	Writer	1 episode	
2021	The Wonder Gang	Writer	1 episode	

== Accolades ==
Year	Show	Category	Result
2021	The Newsreader	AACTA Award (Best Supporting Actress)	Nominated
2024	The Newsreader	AACTA Award (Best Supporting Actress)	Nominated
