= Pepe Ébano =

Peruvian-Spanish percussionist (1935–2022)

- Birth name: José Luis Ganoza Barrionuevo
- Born: December 12, 1935; Lima, Peru
- Died: July 8, 2022 (aged 86); Madrid, Spain
- Genres: Flamenco
- Occupation(s): Musician, Percussionist
- Instrument(s): Bongo drum, Cajón

José Luis Ganoza Barrionuevo (December 12, 1935 – July 8, 2022), known as Pepe Ébano, was a Peruvian-Spanish percussionist who accompanied the main figures of Spanish music. He was the lead percussionist, playing the Bongo on the single Entre dos aguas, a flamenco rumba created by guitarist Paco de Lucía and considered a flamenco masterpiece. He was one of the introducers of the Cajón in flamenco music.

== Biography ==
José Luis Ganoza Barrionuevo, known as Pepe Ébano, was born in Lima, Peru on December 12, 1935, son of Valentina Barrionuevo, owner of "La Peña Valentina", in Lima, where he promoted Peruvian Creole music, and in his honor the dance contest "La Valentina de Oro" was organized.

Pepe Ébano arrived in Spain in 1956 with singer Alberto Cortez 'El Original', who has played in the TVE orchestra and with the most important Spanish and Latin American musicians. He is mistakenly identified as 'José Sánchez' and is sometimes attributed with Cuban or Puerto Rican nationality.

He died in Madrid on July 8, 2022, aged 86.

== Discography ==
- Alfonso Santisteban & Rafael Ferro - Flamenco Pop (album), 1969.
- Paco de Lucía - Entre dos aguas (single), 1973.
- Paco de Lucía - Fuente y caudal (album), 1973.
- Vainica Doble - Heliotropo (album), 1973.
- Juan Camacho - Juan Camacho (album), 1974.
- Juan Camacho - A ti, mujer (album), 1975
- Manzanita - Poco ruido y mucho duende (album), 1978.
- Manzanita - Verde (album), 1978.
- Camarón de la Isla - La leyenda del tiempo (album), 1979.
- Paloma San Basilio - Vuela Alto (album), 1986.
- Mecano - Entre el cielo y el suelo (album), 1986.
- Mecano - Cruz de navajas (single), 1986.
- Mecano - Descanso dominical (album), 1988.
- Mecano - Figlio della luna (album), 1989.
- Cántores de Híspalis - Por la paz (album), 1988.
- Plácido Domingo - Soñadores de España (album), 1989.
- María Dolores Pradera - Por derecho (album), 1992.
- María Dolores Pradera - Toda una vida (album), 1994.
- Tito Duarte - La herencia del viejo sabor (album), 2004.
- Rosendo Mercado - El endémico embustero y el incauto pertinaz (La triste cagalera), 2007.
