= Thomas Lorenzo =

Australian guitarist (born 1964)

- Lorenzo performing Frankston Performance Center 2014

Background information
- Born: 11 January 1964 (age 62); Wollongong, New South Wales, Australia
- Genres: Jazz, World Music, Latin Jazz, Flamenco
- Occupations: Musician, composer, Music Producer
- Instrument: Guitar
- Years active: 1989–present
- Labels: Barcelona, Ottomani, TL Music
- Website: www.thomaslorenzo.com

Thomas Lorenzo (born 11 January 1964) is a guitarist, composer, record producer, and music theorist.

== Biography ==
=== Early years and education ===
He is the son of Spanish immigrants that left behind fascism in the 1950s to start a new life in Australian democracy. He started playing the classical guitar at the age of ten in a musical environment based on traditional Spanish music and the Australian rock and pop scene of the 1970s. Lorenzo's interest in guitar increased around 1970 when he saw the Beatles perform on TV. When Francisco Franco, the Spanish dictator, died and democracy was reinstalled in Spain, the family returned to Barcelona.

For his 18th birthday, his parents allowed him to buy his first electric guitar, which was a Ibanez AS 200. In Barcelona he studied at the L'Aula de Musica del Conservatori Superior de Música del Liceu. As a composer he has received the commission by the UK national arts lottery in 1997 to compose the suite called The Immigrant, which premiered at the Paul McCartney Auditorium in Liverpool, England.

Lorenzo's life changed after hearing the album Wired (Jeff Beck album), Blue Benson by George Benson, Four & More by Miles Davis. Soon after, he was captivated by Wes Montgomery's album Smokin' at the Half Note which was released in 1965 and by Paco de Lucia's Entre dos aguas (album). He cites Jeff Beck, George Benson, the Beatles, Miles Davis, and Wes Montgomery, Paco De Lucia as having the biggest impact on his music.

When he was 18 he was selected as National Jazz Solista Finalist: Ibiza Jazz Festival (1989). He then decided to further pursue his studies and went to Boston, USA. In 1992 he graduated from Berklee College of Music in Boston, having studied commercial arranging under the supervision of Grammy Award winner Robert Freedman.

== Music Educator ==
Thomas was part time lecturer at the Liverpool Institute for Performing Arts from 1995 to 1999. He provided class music tuition in guitar, arranging and ensembles including planning and implementing lessons in accordance with University outcome statements.

Thomas was also music professor at L'Aula de Musica Moderna y Jazz del Conservatori Superior de Música del Liceu from 1993 to 1998 where he implemented music courses that enabled graduates to pursue a career in music by developing extensive skills in relation to music business, management and production.

In 1997 facilitated Courses at the Menéndez Pelayo International University.

In 2012 he founded in Melbourne, Australia, the Creative Guitar School and developed a core curriculum that combines creative learning with music tuition to encourage students to tap into their natural potential and swiftly reach their musical goals.

In 2020 he founded the online Creative Guitar Academy with specific guitar courses for songwriting and music production on the guitar.

== Books ==
He is the author of a textbook ‘El Arreglo Un Puzzle de Expresión Musical’* El Arreglo Un Puzzle de Expresión Musical (TL Productions, 2005). on arranging and orchestration commissioned by the SGAE in 1997 and published in 2005 by Bosch Música, Barcelona

He successfully completed an eight-year project focussed on studying arranging and orchestration in Spanish, using contemporary approach to modern trends and styles as well as impact voicing, linear writing, Latin music, making small bands sound big, string writing, vocal arranging, enhancing backgrounds and studio recordings versus live recordings.

He established the concept of applying plain listening to music production which enabled instruments, melodies and harmonies to be heard in a manner that would not occur in a natural projection of the vibrant source.

== Guitars ==
=== Hermanos Conde ===
Lorenzo plays an Hermanos Conde Media Luna as his choice of nylon string guitar. He commented "I love this sound because of its sharp attack and extreme sweetness in all registers. He plays this guitar on tracks as * Ducura con Rabia (Barcelona Music, 2009) from his album Spanish Breeze (Barcelona Music, 2009).

=== Stratocaster SRV ===
Lorenzo Plays SRV Strat

Lorenzo plays the Stratocaster SRV model as his choice of electric guitar sound. He plays this guitar on the track You're Cute (Barcelona Music, 2009), recorded in Westlake Recording Studios, in Los Angeles in 2009 with Bruce Sugar as sound engineer for the album Spanish Breeze (Barcelona Music, 2009).

=== Paul Reed Smith 1989 ===
Thomas commented "Whenever I need a sustained electric guitar sound I choose my Paul Reed Smith 1989 single coil model". He plays this guitar on the tracks Blue Secrets (Barcelona Music, 2009) from his album Spanish Breeze (Barcelona Music, 2009).

== Discography ==
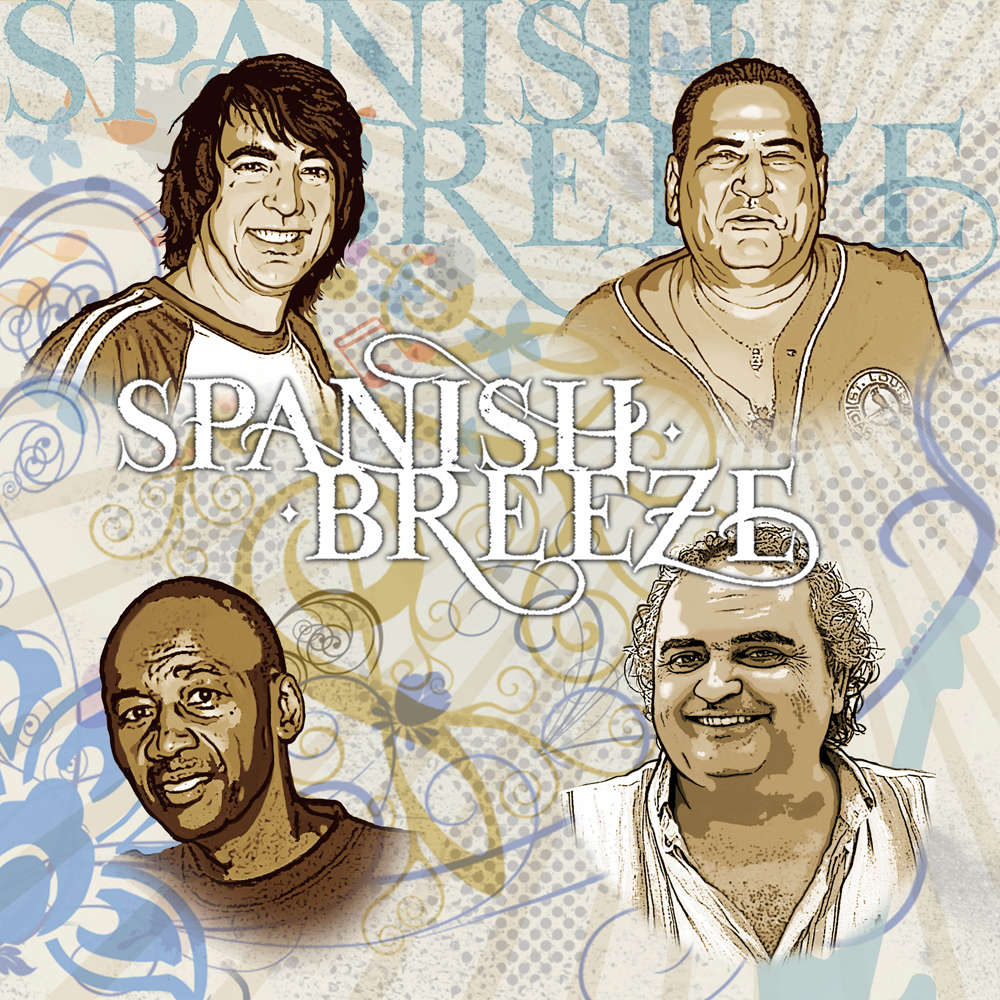
Cover art of Spanish Breeze

- El Deseo (Ottomani, 2000)
- Espacio, (Ottomani, 2001)
- Juego de Almas (Ottomani, 2003)
- Spanish Breeze (Barcelona Music, 2009) with Alphonso Johnson on bass, Walfredo Reyes, Jr. on drums, Dave Garfield on piano, and engineered by Bruce Sugar.
- A Gentle Touch (TL Productions, 2020).
- Caminando (TL Productions, 2019).
- Libertad (TL Productions, 2018).
- Nostalgia (TL Productions, 2018).
- Friends (TL Productions, 2018).
- Dos Gardenias (TL Productions, 2017).
- Australia Flamenjazz Guitar (TL Productions, 2017).
- Triste (TL Productions, 2016).
- Yesterday (TL Productions, 2016).
- Tico Tico no Fubá (TL Productions, 2016).
