= Deadloch =

Australian television series

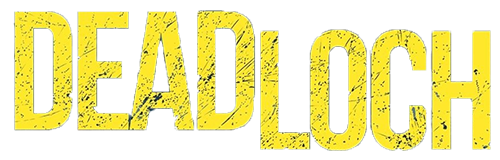
- Genre: Black comedy; Crime; Mystery
- Created by: Kate McCartney; Kate McLennan
- Directed by: Ben Chessell; Gracie Otto; Beck Cole
- Starring: Kate Box; Madeleine Sami; Alicia Gardiner; Nina Oyama
- Composer: Amanda Brown
- Country of origin: Australia
- Original language: English
- No. of series: 2
- No. of episodes: 14

Production
- Executive producers: Kate McCartney; Kate McLennan; Kevin Whyte; Tanya Phegan
- Producer: Andy Walker
- Cinematography: Andy Walker; Katie Milwright; Simon Ozlins
- Editors: Annabelle Johnson; Julie-Ann De Rico; Angie Higgins
- Production companies: Amazon Studios; OK Great Productions; Guesswork Television

Original release
- Network: Amazon Prime Video
- Release: 2 June 2023 – present

Deadloch is an Australian black comedy crime mystery television series that premiered on Amazon Prime Video on 2 June 2023. Created by Kate McCartney and Kate McLennan, the story is set in Deadloch, a fictional town in Tasmania, and stars Kate Box, Madeleine Sami, Alicia Gardiner, and Nina Oyama. Deadloch was produced by Amazon Studios. The second series premiered on Prime Video on 20 March 2026.

== Synopsis ==
In season one, the beguilingly sleepy settlement of Deadloch, on Tasmania's coastline, is shaken when the body of a local man turns up dead on the beach. Two female detectives reluctantly take charge of the investigation together: the fastidious Senior Sergeant Dulcie Collins, and the brash and reckless Detective Eddie Redcliffe from Darwin, aided by overeager Constable Abby Matsuda and ditsy Officer Sven Alderman. The murder coincides with the town's annual "Winter Feastival" — a celebration of local arts, cuisine and culture. The investigation forces Dulcie and Eddie to cope with each other's drastically opposite investigation styles, as they discover secrets being hidden in a town struggling to disguise the deep rift that's slowly splitting it and the lives of its residents.

In season two, returning home to Darwin to investigate Bushy's death Eddie and Dulcie are thrown into a murder case of a local icon.

== Cast and characters ==
=== Main ===
- Kate Box as Dulcie Collins, Senior Sergeant in Deadloch's police force, a former detective who demoted herself at the wishes of her wife, Cath.
- Madeleine Sami as Eddie Redcliffe, a detective originally from Darwin, with an unconventional, and at times gratingly obnoxious but sometimes subvertingly inspired, take on police work.
- Alicia Gardiner as Cath York, the possessive wife of Dulcie Collins, with deep relationships with most of the women of the town.
- Nina Oyama as Abby Matsuda, an excitable and enthusiastic, yet diffident, constable.

=== Recurring (series 1) ===
- Holly Austin as Skye O'Dwyer, the lesbian daughter of Victoria and Sam O'Dwyer, who recently returned to Deadloch to open a restaurant.
- Tom Ballard as Sven Alderman, a gay officer usually handed the less important tasks that allows him to slack on the job.
- Astrid Wells Cooper as Claire Connelly, a therapist and artist residing in Deadloch, and choir leader of the town's women's chorus.
- Duncan Fellows as Ray McLintock, a peculiar town resident, working at Vic's cafe, has a pet donkey, and becomes romantically involved with Eddie.
- Kris McQuade as Victoria O'Dwyer, the wife of long-missing Sam O'Dwyer, who runs a local cafe.
- Shaun Martindale as Phil McGangus, a surly, homophobic entrepreneur and the spokesperson for residents of the town who feel pushed out by its changes in recent years.
- Kartanya Maynard as Miranda Hoskins, an Aboriginal girl who feels less-than-comfortable in Margaret Carruthers pressuring her into a funded scholarship.
- Mia Morrissey as Nadiyah Zammit, Skye's wife.
- Naarah as Sharelle Muir, a barmaid with an antagonistic attitude towards police.
- Pamela Rabe as Margaret Carruthers, Deadloch's de facto matriarch, descended from the family that colonised the area, with a complicated relationship with the Aboriginal people her ancestors displaced.
- Katie Robertson as Vanessa Latham, the self-assured yet ditzy wife of Trent Latham.
- Nick Simpson-Deeks as James King, Deadloch's arrogant and misogynistic forensic examiner, who is engaged to Abby.
- Hayden Spencer as Commissioner Shane Hastings, the sexist and brash Chief of Police for Tasmania.
- Leonie Whyman as Tammy Hampson, an Aboriginal teenage girl determined to become a pro footballer, and best friend of Miranda Hoskins.
- Susie Youssef as Aleyna Rahme, the town's mayor, who is often in Phil McGangus' crosshairs.
- Harvey Zielinski as Gez Rahme, Aleyna Rahme's skittish husband.
- Harry Radbone as Tom O'Dwyer, the son of Skye and Nadiyah, who is bullied by the local boys for his non-traditional family and tries to adopt homophobic and sexist attitudes in order to join the football team.
- Yulan Jack (credited as Stephanie Jack) as Megan Lang, a pushy local journalist.
- Matt Burton as Jimmy Cook, a down-and-out with a track record of performing lewd acts in public.
- Ned Ward as Hunter Patterson, a loud mouthed, local boy and keen footballer. Hunter frequently makes homophobic and sexist remarks about others in the community.

=== Recurring (series 2) ===
- Luke Hemsworth as Jason Wade, a celebrity wildlife presenter who owns the crocodile tour company Land of Crocs in Barra Creek.
- Jean Tong as Leo Lee, a non-binary journalist who assists Eddie and Dulcie with the murder investigation
- Genevieve Morris as Pat Heffernan
- Steve Bisley as Frank McCallister, Eddie's loud father
- Shari Sebbens as Miki Evans
- Damien Garvey as Superintendent Col Culkin
- Anthony J Sharpe as DJ Darrell
- Nikki Britton as Amber Darrell
- Ling Cooper Tang as Lynn
- Bev Killich as Colleen Darrell
- Talijah Blackman-Corowa as Allira
- Ines English as Roisin, a teacher from Dublin working at Land of Crocs.

== Episodes ==
Season	Episodes	Originally released	
Season	Episodes	First released	Last released
1	8	June 2, 2023	July 7, 2023
2	6	March 20, 2026	

=== Season 1 (2023) ===
No. overall	No. in season	Title	Directed by	Written by	Original release date
1	1	"Episode 1"	Ben Chessell	Kate McLennan	2 June 2023
When the body of Trent Latham washes up on the shores of Deadloch, Senior Sergeant Dulcie Collins is thrust back into detective work after deliberately stepping back to forge a more quiet life with her highly-strung wife Cath. Her initial resistance turns into a strong motivation, but is soon impeded by the arrival of Eddie Radcliffe, a radical, unorthodox detective dispatched from Darwin. Her disorganised, lackadaisical approach to the investigation severely grates, both with Dulcie and the victim's family and associates, but a strong conviction about the case that Dulcie rebuffs as nonsense, and an attempt by Eddie to order to wrap the case up quickly, turns out to potentially be plausible, especially when a notable detail about the victim's body comes into play.
2	2	"Episode 2"	Ben Chessell	Kate McLennan & Kim Wilson	2 June 2023
With both Latham brothers now dead, both their bodies without tongues, Dulcie is convinced that there is a link between them, and also the circumstances surrounding the death of the town's previous mayor, Rod Dixon, several years ago, who also washed up on the town's shores. However, Eddie is vocally displeased about following Dulcie's theory, and instead interrogates Phil McGangus, a surly local entrepreneur, and drags along people-pleasing constable Abby on a stakeout. Dulcie takes matters into her own hands and oversees a dramatically-flawed exhumation of the mayor's body, while Eddie's behaviour grows more erratic with her next theory about the possible return of a long-disappeared town heavyweight being behind the Lathams' demise... with Dulcie's night out and Eddie's first night temporarily setting up home in his former hideaway both ending in high drama.
3	3	"Episode 3"	Beck Cole	Kate McCartney, Kate McLennan & Christian White	2 June 2023
The body of Sam O'Dwyer - missing for five years - appears on the lake shoreline, with the revelation that O'Dwyer's - and the other victims' - tongue was excised prior to death by strangulation throwing Dulcie, who aims to find a criminal profiler, while her frustration grows with Eddie's refusal to acknowledge her serial killer theory. The discovery of blood on the remnants of O'Dwyer's boat sends Eddie's intense obsession with Phil McGangus - and her apparent desperation to ensure the case is closed as soon as possible - into overdrive, ordering mass DNA testing of all male townsfolk. Abby's determination to delve further into the links between all four victims leads to a revelation that completely alters the direction of the case.
4	4	"Episode 4"	Beck Cole	Kate McCartney & Kate McLennan	9 June 2023
With Eddie now open to cooperation with Dulcie, and entertaining the serial killer theory, the two begin looking into the family and associates of Rod Dixon, the first victim. Their investigations are upended by the news Sam O'Dwyer was not killed in the same fashion as the other three men, Cath's clinginess and annoyance at Dulcie's reluctance to impart case details that goes beyond police procedure, the relentless probing of a local journalist, the mayor panicking her authority and the respect for her position is being undermined, Abby's disquiet at having to keep information that could prove vital to the case secret, and a discovery that results in the case being reset, its increasingly scattergun focus disturbing Eddie, with dangerous consequences.
5	5	"Episode 5"	Gracie Otto	Kate McCartney, Kate McLennan & Madeleine Sami	16 June 2023
The sight of Jimmy Cook's body in a crucifixion-like state on the beach warps the investigation, and puts Dulcie and Eddie firmly in the Commissioner's firing line - ordering them to find a suspect by nightfall, lest they be replaced as the investigating officers. Their sights become set on Mike - the last person to see Jimmy alive, and former officer within Deadloch Police at the time of the botched investigation into Rod Dixon's death - through an interrogation of whom they uncover a secret the town has made him hide for decades, and also the clues to what could be their next suspect, to Dulcie's dismay at even contemplating such a person, as it places her already fraying relationship with an increasingly clingy Cath under strain. Abby's relationship with James also becomes fraught when his hubris begins to harm the investigation, and forces her to perform forensic testing herself.
6	6	"Episode 6"	Gracie Otto	Kate McCartney, Kate McLennan & Anchuli Felicia King	23 June 2023
Dulcie becomes torn between her job and her life outside of it, with friend Skye O'Dwyer now firmly the prime suspect. Abby's intuition - despite some gaslighting from fiancé James - helps lead the team to realise any vessel that may have been used to kill Jimmy and then set up his body on the beach could not have been moored on Deadloch's shoreline, with the private Carruthers Island the likely location... with Dulcie's greatest fears confirmed after finding evidence implicating Skye in Jimmy's death - on top of a lack of an alibi for the night of her father's death. Dulcie's conflicts step up a notch when she learns those closest to her have been secluding vital information, and the investigation becomes hugely more complicated when a protest at a Feastival event surfaces more than just simmering town tensions. Meanwhile, Eddie is finally convinced to let her guard down and not let her past haunt her forever, Miranda rebuffs Margaret's offer of a scholarship, and Tom betrays a friendship in order to win favour with the homophobic football team.
7	7	"Episode 7"	Ben Chessell	Kate McCartney, Kate McLennan & Kirsty Fisher	30 June 2023
With six more victims recovered from the lake, Dulcie and Eddie are initially puzzled by the lack of a link between these latest victims and the previous, until Abby leads them to believe the killings are motivated by all the victims' past record of violence against women, and questioning dutifully begins on the O'Dwyers, their friends and associates. Their queries uncover a family secret hidden for years, but don't believe they are implicated, bailing them shortly before a car almost kills a group of protesting men, led by Phil McGangus, who then takes charge in ordering an evacuation of all remaining men in Deadloch. Commissioner Hastings, irate at the decision to let the clear suspect in his eyes go - Skye O'Dwyer - takes charge of the investigation, orders the arrest of the questioned women, and presents evidence ostensibly proving they are behind the killings. However, new forensics convinces Dulcie and Eddie that the killer is not a woman - and there's a fox amongst the chickens on the bus full of men speeding out of town...
8	8	"Episode 8"	Ben Chessell	Kate McCartney & Kate McLennan	7 July 2023
Dulcie and Eddie are shut out of the case, but together with Abby and Sven secretly continue their investigations outside of Hastings' purview. A naked, bloody, and tongue-less Phil McGangus' arrival back in Deadloch sparks Hastings to concoct a theory that Skye is currently in charge of the bus full of men, and has kidnapped them, taking them to the mainland. Dulcie and Eddie's own work results in the bus being found - crashed over a cliff; evidence, though, proves it was empty at the time, and that one of the men aboard instead hijacked the bus, and has taken the men somewhere secluded, sending the team up into the mountains. There, Eddie is informed something about her past that reshapes her entire outlook on life, while back in Deadloch, the women, locked up all day, receive some home truths about each other. Meanwhile, Miranda and Tammy learn Margaret has not been entirely truthful about who in the family was to blame for the refusal to return Carruthers Island to their Aboriginal tribe.

=== Season 2 (2026) ===
No. overall	No. in season	Title	Directed by	Written by	Original release date
9	1	"Croc Justice"	Beck Cole	Kate McCartney & Kate McLennan	20 March 2026
Dulcie, Cath and Eddie arrive in Darwin to investigate Bushy's death, but are quickly thrown onto a new case in Barra Creek.
10	2	"None of Your Business"	Beck Cole	Kate McCartney & Kate McLennan	20 March 2026
More body parts are found in the river as Dulcie and Eddie begin questioning the Darrell family and pay an unexpected visit to Land of Crocs.
11	3	"The Boys"	Beck Cole	Kate McCartney & Kate McLennan	20 March 2026
At the Big Barra Bashnanza, Dulcie and Eddie question Jason Wade and his boys, while the river is searched for a weapon.
12	4	"Ladies Day Night Day Night"	Gracie Otto	Kate McCartney & Kate McLennan	20 March 2026
With Frank in custody, Dulcie and Eddie are out gathering evidence - but when they veer off track and abandon their car, they risk getting lost.
13	5	"Amigos Para Siempre"	Gracie Otto	Kate McCartney & Kate McLennan	20 March 2026
Internal Investigators are in town to speak with the detectives, and Dulcie ends up in the middle of a very dangerous situation.
14	6	"Curlew's Call"	Gracie Otto	Kate McCartney & Kate McLennan	20 March 2026
Dulcie finds herself in the centre of an illegal operation, and inches closer to the truth at the heart of the case. While at Don's funeral, tensions in the Darrell family erupt as the rains begin to fall.

== Production ==
=== Series 1 ===
Kate McCartney and Kate McLennan are the show runners and producers of the series. "The Kates", as they are nicknamed, were inspired to write a comedy from a set-up similar to that of the UK series Broadchurch after they both watched the series, so much so the working title of the project was "Funny Broadchurch". Actress Nina Oyama told the Sydney Morning Herald: "The show is first and foremost a crime show, because of the way it’s laid out, and the way people will keep returning to it will be for the crime-based and mystery-based reasons ... But it's also very funny.” There was also an intention in the production to subvert some of the typical genre tropes, and reverse who are usually considered the victims in society. There is a sub-plot of a First Nations storyline around local teenagers played by Leonie Whyman and Kartanya Maynard.

Deadloch was written by McCartney and McLennan along with Kim Wilson, Christian White, Anchuli Felicia King, Kirsty Fisher, and Madeleine Sami. Production on the series got underway in February 2022. Directors on the series included Ben Chessell, Gracie Otto, and Beck Cole. Production is by Andy Walker for Prime Video, Guesswork Television, and OK Great Productions, with Fiona McConaghy as co-producer. McCartney, McLennan, Kevin Whyte, and Tanya Phegan were executive producers. The score was written by Amanda Brown.

Filming took place in southern Tasmania, outside Hobart, around Cygnet, Snug and Kingston.

=== Series 2 ===
Deadloch was renewed for a second series on 8 July 2024.

The second series is also written by the Kates, directed by Beck Cole with Gracie Otto, and produced by Andrew Walker. Cinematography is by Rob Marsh and Drew English, and original music was composed by Amanda Brown. Angie Higgins and Julie-Anne De Ruvo were editors on the series.

Continuing from the series one finale, detectives Dulcie Collins and Eddie Redcliffe are in the Top End investigating the death of Eddie's ex-partner, Bushy. The Kates' writing was informed by Aboriginal advisers, including writer Jada Alberts and former police officer and writer Veronica Gorrie. The story includes several Aboriginal characters, including Miki played by Shari Sebbens, and makes reference to issues encountered by Aboriginal people in the Territory.

Filming took place in Darwin and the Top End, in the Northern Territory of Australia. The Kates visited the small town of Bynoe (population 98) during their scouting, and saw a huge crocodile in captivity behind a pub. They spoke of their fascination with crocodiles, after seeing them close-up during filming. They deliberately chose locations that the audience would recognise in Darwin, including the wave pool and sunset from the beach, and made frequent references to the humid weather there. Filming began on location in September 2024, mostly around Batchelor (population 371), afterwards moving production to a studio in Brisbane.

== Broadcast ==
Deadloch premiered on Amazon Prime Video on 2 June 2023 with three episodes, followed by new episodes weekly up to 7 July 2023.

Series two premiered on Prime Video on 20 March 2026.

== Reception ==
Series 1 of Deadloch was received positively. On the review aggregator website Rotten Tomatoes, 100% of 23 critics' reviews are positive, with an average rating of 8.0/10. The website's consensus reads: "An irreverent twist on the crime procedural, Deadloch's addictive mixture of mystery and mordant humor makes most of its corpse-strewn competition look comparably stiff."

In a favourable response from Luke Buckmaster of The Guardian, he gave the series four out of five stars, and praised creators Kate McCartney and Kate McLennan – "They are moving into the next phase of their career, with Deadloch, a narratively richer series that’s dark and dramatic, and often also very funny." In a positive review from Pemi Bakshi of Grazia magazine said that "the eight-part series blends humour and commentary to bring us a wickedly entertaining take on the detective show genre." In a somewhat more mixed review for website Screen Hub, Stephen A. Russell gave a rating of three stars out of five and commented that "While Deadloch's far from dead on arrival, its enervating lack of structural ambition did kill a lot of the buzz I had going in." The series was a worldwide hit, reaching the top 10 on Prime in over 165 countries, including the UK and the US.

Luke Buckmaster also gave the second series four out of five stars, calling it "every bit as wonky, devilish and potty-mouthed as the first".

== Accolades ==
Year	Award	Category	Nominee(s)	Result	Ref.
2024	AACTA Awards	Best Narrative Comedy Series	Kate McCartney, Kate McLennan, Andrew Walker, Kevin Whyte – Guesswork Television, OK Great Productions and Amazon Studios (Amazon Prime Video)	Nominated	
2024	AACTA Awards	Best Acting in a Comedy	Kate Box	Won	
2024	AACTA Awards	Best Acting in a Comedy	Nina Oyama	Nominated	
2024	AACTA Awards	Best Direction in a Comedy Series	Ben Chessell (Episode 1)	Nominated	
2024	AACTA Awards	Best Screenplay in Television	Kate McCartney, Kate McLennan (Episode 1)	Won	
2024	AACTA Awards	Best Cinematography in Television	Katie Milwright (Episode 1)	Nominated	
2024	AACTA Awards	Best Editing in Television	Angie Higgins (Episode 1)	Won	
2024	AACTA Awards	Best Original Score in Television	Amanda Brown (Episode 1)	Won	
2024	AACTA Awards	Best Production Design in Television	Emma Fletcher (Episode 1)	Nominated	
2024	AACTA Awards	Best Casting in Television	Alison Telford, Kate Leonard	Won	
2024	Screen Producers Australia	Comedy Program or Series Production of the Year	Guesswork Television and OK Great Productions	Won	
2024	TV Tonight Awards	Best Australian Comedy	Deadloch	Nominated	
2024	TV Tonight Awards	Best New Australian Show	Deadloch	Won	
2024	Equity Ensemble Awards	Outstanding Performance by an Ensemble in a Comedy Series	Holly Austin, Tom Ballard, Kate Box, Duncan Fellows, Alicia Gardiner, Shaun Martindale, Kartanya Maynard, Kris McQuade, Mia Morrissey, Naarah, Nina Oyama, Pamela Rabe, Katie Robertson, Madeleine Sami, Nick Simpson-Deeks, Leonie Whyman, Susie Youssef, Harvey Zielinski	Won	
2024	Logie Awards	Best Lead Actress in a Comedy	Kate Box	Nominated	
2024	Logie Awards	Best Lead Actress in a Comedy	Madeleine Sami	Nominated	
2024	Logie Awards	Best Scripted Comedy Program	Deadloch	Nominated	
2024	International Emmy Awards	Best Comedy Series	Deadloch	Nominated	
