= Kiki and Kitty =

- Genre: Comedy
- Created by: Nakkiah Lui
- Written by: Nakkiah Lui
- Directed by: Catriona McKenzie
- Starring: Nakkiah Lui; Elaine Crombie
- Composer: Chiara Constanza
- Country of origin: Australia
- Original language: English
- No. of seasons: 1
- No. of episodes: 6

Production
- Executive producer: Kelrick Martin
- Producers: Liz Watts; Sylvia Warmer
- Editor: Gabriel Dowrick
- Running time: 13 minutes
- Production company: Porchlight Films

Original release
- Network: ABC iview
- Release: 17 December 2017

Kiki and Kitty is an Australian comedy series released through ABC Television's streaming service, iview, in 2017 and then screened on ABC Comedy.

== Production ==
The series is created and written by Nakkiah Lui, produced by Liz Watts and Sylvia Warmer for Porchlight Films, and directed by Catriona McKenzie.

== Cast ==
- Nakkiah Lui as Kiki
- Elaine Crombie as Kitty
- Christine Anu as Maria, Kiki's mum
- Tessa Rose as Nan
- Charlie Garber as Jack
- Harriet Dyer as Cherise
- Ryan Johnson as Brandon
- Rob Carlton as Bryce
- Lisa Flanagan as Nan's Kitty
- Dave Eastgate as Jack Junior
- Steve Rodgers as Merryweather

== Episodes ==
Episode information retrieved from Australian Television Archive.

No.	Title	Directed by	Written by	Original release date
1	"Kiki Comes to Town"	Catriona McKenzie	Nakkiah Lui	17 December 2017
2	"A Blessing in Disguise"	Catriona McKenzie	Nakkiah Lui	17 December 2017
3	"Live Fast, Die Young"	Catriona McKenzie	Nakkiah Lui	17 December 2017
4	"Big Trouble in Little 'Gina"	Catriona McKenzie	Nakkiah Lui	17 December 2017
5	"Revenge Is a Dish Best Served Moist"	Catriona McKenzie	Nakkiah Lui	17 December 2017
6	"Ice, Ice Baby"	Catriona McKenzie	Nakkiah Lui	17 December 2017
