= Sally Rugg =

Australian activist (born 1988)

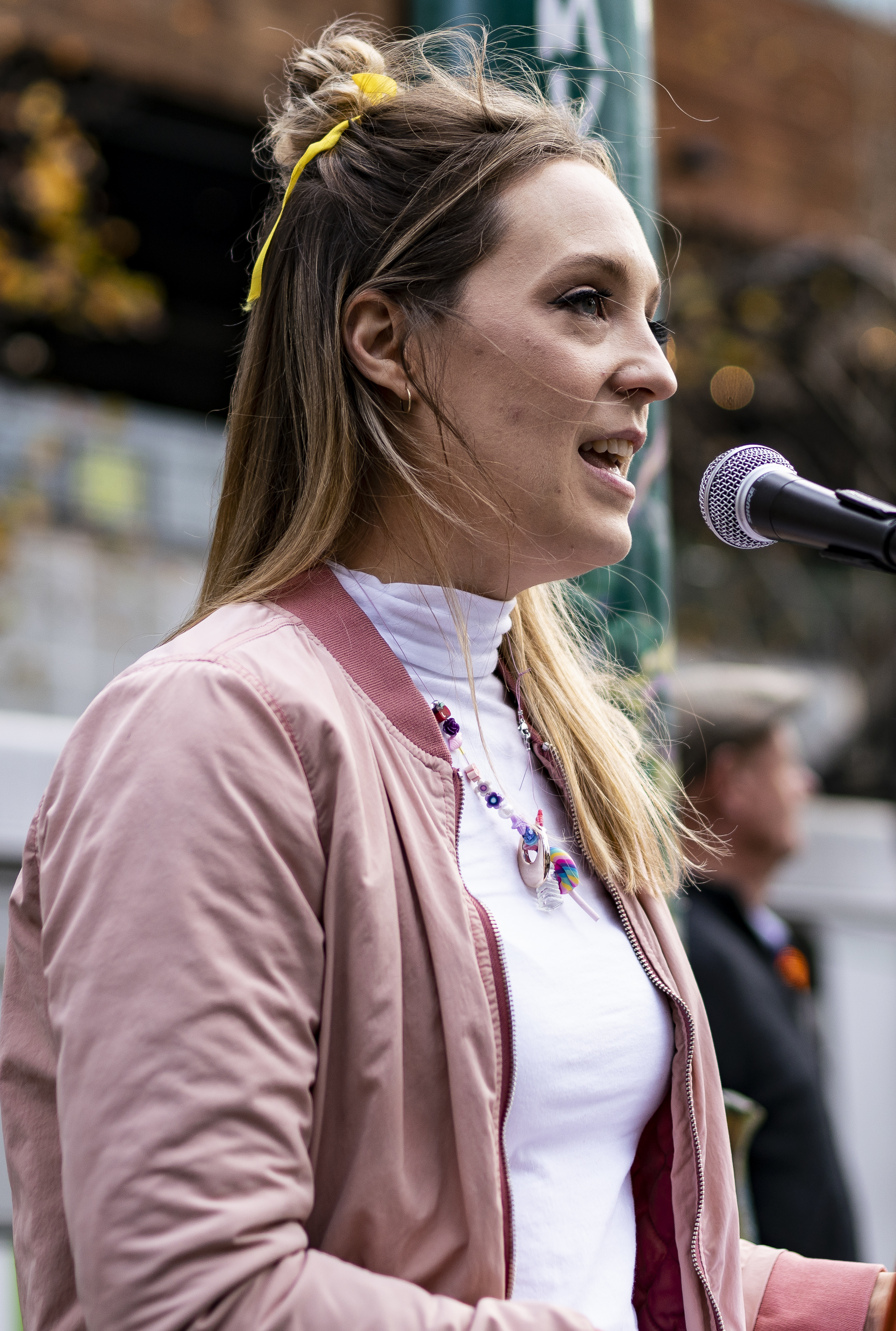
- Rugg at a Melbourne rally in 2021
- Born: 2 October 1988 (age 37) Australia
- Occupation: Activist, writer.
- Period: 2013–present
- Partner: Kate McCartney (2022–present; engaged)

Website
- speakingout.com.au/speaker/sally-rugg/

Sally Rugg is an Australian LGBTIQ activist, feminist and political staffer. Rugg was the GetUp creative and campaigns director between 2013 and 2018. Rugg was one of the many public faces of the "YES" campaign in the Australian Marriage Law Postal Survey and also campaigns for Safe Schools. Until her highly publicised dismissal in 2022, Rugg served as the Chief of Staff for Independent Member of Parliament, Monique Ryan.

== Early life ==
During her early years, Rugg volunteered to work with disadvantaged youth. She then started working at the organisation GetUp, while doing her master's degree in arts. She attended events in the Australian Capital Territory when same-sex marriage was made legal for six days, which she says informed her views.

== Awards and recognition ==
Rugg has won numerous awards due to her campaigning for the YES same-sex marriage vote. There is a room named after Rugg in Oxford Street, Sydney named "The Sally Rugg LGBTIQ Pride Room". In 2018, Rugg was awarded the FBi Radio SMAC of the Year award for her work on the YES same-sex marriage campaign and Strayan of the Year by Pedestrian.tv, for her efforts in the YES campaign. and was a finalist for Hero of the Year at the Australian LGBTI Awards. In 2017, Sally was named among Harper’s Bazaar’s 5 Women of The Year, by Cosmopolitan magazine as one of Australia’s Most Influential LGBTIQ people, ranked first in Mammamia’s Most Powerful LGBTIQ Women list, by Amnesty International’s Top 15 Women Championing Human Rights In Australia. Sally was awarded the Young Achiever Award at the 2016 Honour Awards.

Rugg was a finalist for the Honour Awards Young Achiever Award in 2015, was named among the 23 LGBT Australians to Watch in 2016 by SX Magazine and the Top 40 Under Forty by TimeOut, and won the New South Wales Honour Awards Young Achiever Award in 2016.

== Personal life ==
Rugg is gay. She lives in Melbourne and is engaged to comedian Kate McCartney.

== Writing ==
Rugg writes regularly on activism and feminism, as well as LGBTIQ and human rights. Rugg's work has been published in media including The Sydney Morning Herald, The Guardian, Vice, Pedestrian as well as Junkee. Rugg was a contributing author for books including The Full Catastrophe, (2019) as well as Growing Up Queer in Australia, (2019).

Her first book, How Powerful We Are: Behind the scenes with one of Australia's leading activists, is her narrative about legalizing same-sex marriage.

== Dispute with Monique Ryan ==
After winning the seat of Kooyong at the 2022 election, Monique Ryan hired Rugg as chief of staff. Rugg was formerly an executive director of Change.org, and was a key voice in the marriage equality debate as campaign director of left-wing activist group GetUp! from 2013 to 2018. Whilst initially things were positive, disagreements emerged regarding Rugg's work hours and responsibilities. Further incidents then arose in November 2022 that which Rugg alleged amounted to hostile conduct in the workplace.

On January 21, six months after Rugg's employment, Rugg resigned as chief of staff, and on January 25, Rugg lodged a court application alleging Ryan and the Commonwealth breached general protections under the Fair Work Act. Rugg claimed to have been forced to work 70–80 hours per week, including weekends, early morning and late nights, 12-hour days on sitting weeks and 8–9 hours in her office on non-sitting days. Ryan disagrees "with any suggestion that I required or expected Ms Rugg to work that number of hours".

After failures at mediation and dispute resolution the case proceeded to trial. Rugg lost an injunction on 7 March 2023 to stop her termination as Ryan's chief of staff. The case management hearing was heard by Justice Debra Mortimer. Part of the reasoning included the fact that Nina O'Connor had already been "seconded" from Climate 200 to replace Rugg.

On 8 May 2023, Rugg accepted a settlement of approximately $100,000 with no admission of fault by Ryan or the government, with all parties paying their own costs.
