= Vorwerk (company) =

German corporate group

Coordinates: 51°16′26″N 7°12′01″E

Vorwerk SE & Co. KG

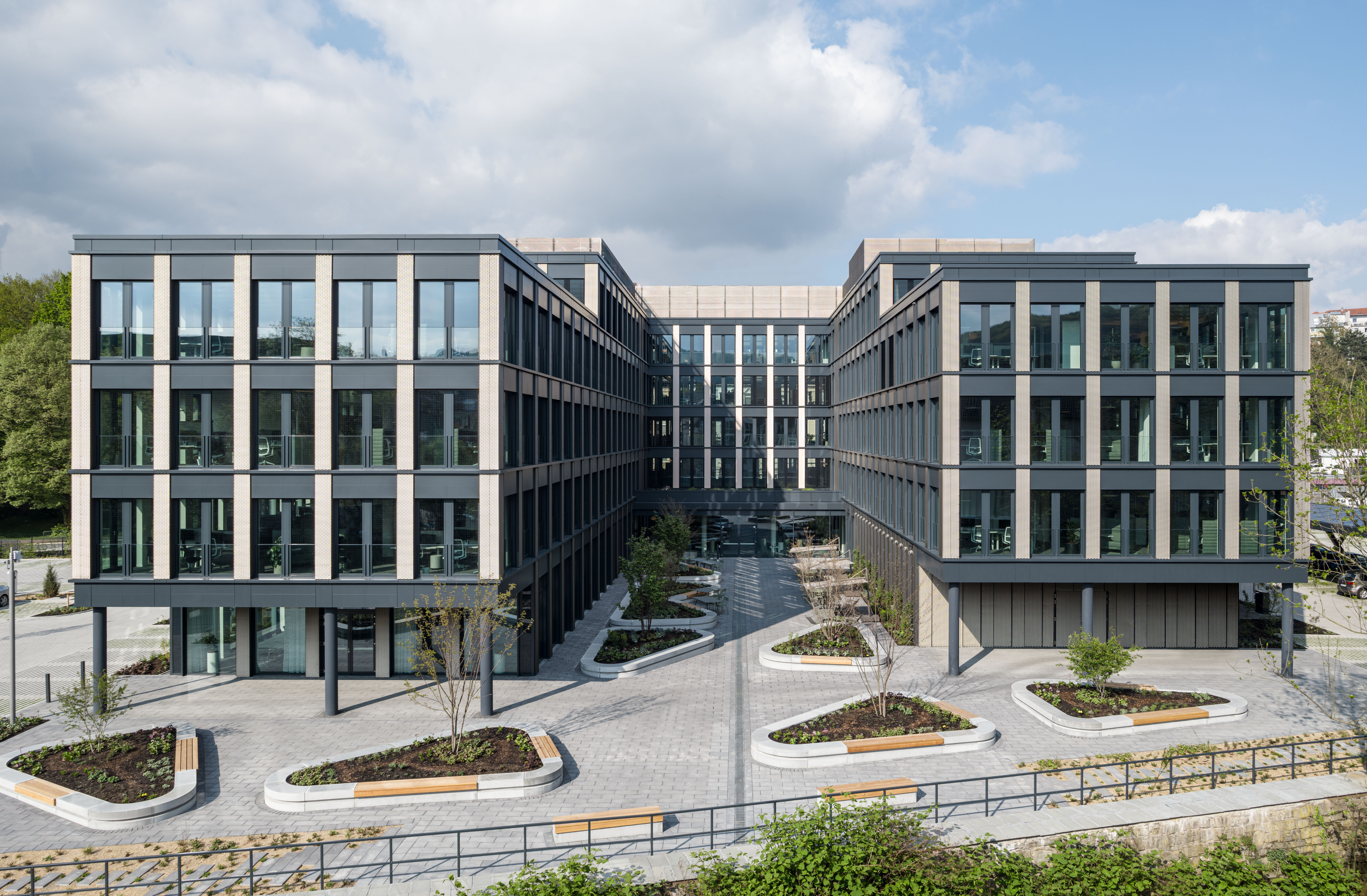
- Group headquarters in Wuppertal-Rauental (2025)
- Type: Kommanditgesellschaft
- Industry: Retail, electronics
- Founded: Wuppertal, Germany (1883)
- Founder: Adolf Vorwerk; Carl Vorwerk
- Headquarters: Wuppertal
- Key people: Thomas Stoffmehl (speaker of the executive board); Hauke Paasch (member of the executive board); Thomas Rodemann (member of the executive board)
- Products: Household appliances, financial services, electronics
- Revenue: €3.2 billion (2024 group sales)
- Total assets: 5,705,000,000 euro (2025)
- Number of employees: 9,307 (2024)
- Website: vorwerk-group.com

Vorwerk SE & Co. KG, trading as Vorwerk (German pronunciation: [ˈfoːɐ̯ˌvɛʁk]), is an international diversified corporate group headquartered in Wuppertal, Germany. Vorwerk was founded in 1883. The core business is the production and the sale of two household products (Thermomix, a kitchen appliance; Kobold, a vacuum cleaner) mainly via direct sales.

Akf Bank, founded in 1968, is a subsidiary of the company and is a financing partner for medium-sized companies.

The company, which is family-owned and operated as a limited partnership, reported having 9,307 employees as of 2024. The company posted a revenue of €3.2 billion in 2024.

== History ==
=== The beginnings – Barmer Teppichfabrik Vorwerk & Co ===
In 1883, the Barmer Teppichfabrik Vorwerk & Co was founded by the brothers Carl (1847–1907) and Adolf Vorwerk. That very same year, the brothers parted ways again and Carl Vorwerk continued to run the company. The firm initially manufactured high-quality carpets and upholstery fabrics, and later also the looms used to make them – first under an English patent, and then under an improved proprietary patent.

Carl Vorwerk's son, Carl Jr. (1878–1904), was to be his successor as company director, but he died just a few months after taking the helm in 1903. Thus, upon the death of the company founder in 1907, his son-in-law, August Mittelsten Scheid (1871–1955), became sole managing partner. Under his leadership, the company diversified following the First World War, taking up the production of laundry and dyeing machines, gear units, and electric motors for gramophones as its military research efforts halted.

=== Kobold and direct sales ===
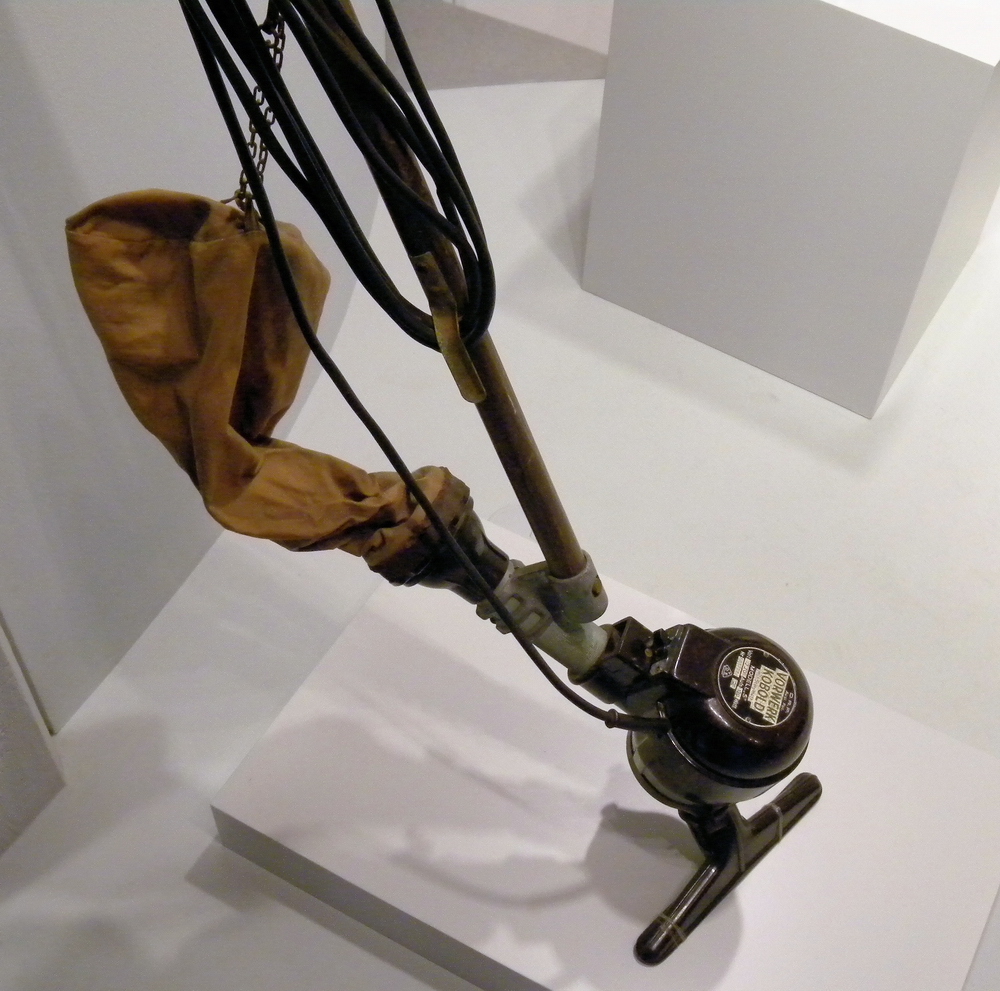
Early vacuum cleaner Vorwerk Kobold, c. 1950

As radio grew in popularity in the 1920s, gramophone sales dropped precipitously. This dire situation gave rise to the birth of the “Vorwerk Kobold” in 1929: chief engineer Engelbert Gorissen developed out of a gramophone motor a high-performance electric upright vacuum cleaner. On 25 May 1930, a patent was granted for the Kobold “Model 30”. At first, sales of what was at the time a completely unknown appliance in Germany were very poor, despite the relatively modest price of 20 Reichsmarks. Only when direct sales were launched in 1930 – the brainchild of Werner Mittelsten Scheid (1904–1953), a son of the company founder – did the product meet with success. By 1935, 100,000 “Kobolds” had been sold, by 1937 half a million and by 1953 one million. Already before the Second World War, in 1938, the first foreign sales organization was established: Vorwerk Folletto in Italy.

During World War II, the main plant in Wuppertal-Barmen was severely damaged in a May 1943 bombing, after which August Mittelsten Scheid's sons, Werner and Erich Mittelsten Scheid, jointly took over management of the firm. The sales organization, which had held the company above water during the war years by selling various products, discontinued operations that year.

After the war was over, production and sales were rebuilt, first in Germany, and then in Europe and overseas. By 1955, 2,000 Vorwerk sales representatives were once again underway. Sole managing partner – following the death of his brother in 1953 – was Erich Mittelsten Scheid.

=== Era of Jörg Mittelsten Scheid ===
In 1969, Dr. Jörg Mittelsten Scheid, Werner's son, succeeded his uncle as head of the family business. Three years later, Günter Busch and Bernd Balders became the first managing partners who were not members of the founding family.

In the 1950s, refrigerators, washing machines, spin dryers and carpet brushes were added to the product range. Until the end of the 1960s, however, the company concentrated mainly on the production and sale of vacuum cleaners, carpets and upholstery fabrics. The company then began to diversify, initially into the service sector. Vorwerk was co-founder of the akf bank in 1968; in 1970 the in-house data processing department brought forth the ZEDA Gesellschaft für Datenverarbeitung und EDV-Beratung and the founding of Hygienic Service Gebäudereinigung und Umweltpflege GmbH in 1974 led to the Hectas Facility Services division. At the same time, the company was also expanding its range of household products. This included the launch of the Thermomix food processor in 1971, followed by Vorwerk fitted kitchens in 1974.

The company kicked off the 21st century with a number of new acquisitions and restructuring projects. In 2001, Vorwerk purchased the Lux Asia Pacific direct sales organization from the Swedish Electrolux group. The next year saw the introduction of the “Feelina” ironing system, and the year after that the spin-off of the company's data processing services: ZEDA was sold to T-Systems in 2003. The final coup was the acquisition of American cosmetic manufacturer Jafra Cosmetics in May 2004. By the end of 2005, Jörg Mittelsten Scheid left the board.

=== Developments since 2005 ===
Vorwerk changed its sales strategy in 2011: the first flagship store opened in Hamburg in December, followed by many more stores. At the end of 2011, Vorwerk also expanded its concept with an online store. Sales of the Kobold were also switched from rotation to fixed areas in 2010. In 2014, Thermomix sales exceeded those of the Kobold for the first time. In 2017, Vorwerk acquired robotic vacuum manufacturer Neato Robotics, a US-based company known for its robot vacuum cleaners. In 2019, Vorwerk was in the forefront amongst the German companies that signed up for the Made in Germany - Made by Vielfalt initiative.

In the late summer of 2020, the Flooring division was separated through a management buy-out. In the following year, the company changed its name: Vorwerk & Co. KG became Vorwerk SE & Co. KG. Since 2022, the board of directors at Vorwerk has been in the hands of Thomas Stoffmehl (speaker of the executive board), Hauke Paasch (member of the executive board) and Thomas Rodemann (member of the executive board). The same year, Vorwerk sold Jafra Cosmetics to the Mexican direct sales company Betterware for US$255 million. In May 2023, Neato Robotics ceased operations, but Vorwerk committed to keeping the cloud services active for at least another five years. In 2025, Vorwerk announced the immediate shutdown of all Neato cloud services effectively bricking all cloud connected Neato robots. This led to an uproar in the user community, including a petition against this decision.

== Company overview ==
=== Company structure ===
Vorwerk is active in more than 60 countries with its own sales companies or via trading partners – known as distributors (as of December 2024).

The consolidated Vorwerk group encompasses over 20 companies worldwide, which are divided into five main fields of business.

==== Main fields of business ====
- Thermomix
- Kobold
- akf-Gruppe
- Vorwerk Ventures
- Nexaro

==== Important companies and locations ====
===== Vorwerk =====
- Vorwerk SE & Co. KG, Wuppertal (Holding)

as well as sales companies in Australia, Austria, Belgium, Canada, China, the Czech Republic, Germany, France, Great Britain and Northern Ireland, Greece, Italy, Luxembourg, Malaysia, Mexico, the Netherlands, New Zealand, Poland, Portugal, Singapore, Spain, Switzerland, Taiwan, Turkey and the United States.

===== Vorwerk production sites =====
- Vorwerk Elektrowerke GmbH & Co. KG, Wuppertal (research, development and production)
- Vorwerk Semco S.A.S., Cloyes-sur-le-Loir, France (Thermomix production)
- Vorwerk Semco S.A.S., Donnemain-Saint-Mamès, France (Thermomix production)
- Vorwerk Household Appliances Co., Inc. Shanghai, China (production and sales)

===== akf =====
- akf bank GmbH & Co. KG, Wuppertal

===== Nexaro =====
- Nexaro GmbH, Wuppertal

=== Key figures ===
In 2024, Vorwerk Group reported revenue of €3.2 billion. Direct sales were the main driver, accounting for 70.8% of sales outside Germany. The share of business volume outside of Germany was 56.7%.

=== Products ===
Vorwerk is primarily known for its production and sales of household appliances, such as Kobold and Thermomix, with the latter being the company's biggest revenue contributor.
