= Made in Germany - Made by Vielfalt =

2024 campaign by German companies

Made in Germany - Made by Vielfalt (Vielfalt = Diversity) is a campaign by more than 135 German companies, promoting tolerance and openness, engaging against xenophobia and political populism. It was created in response to the growth of Germany's far-right political party, the Alternative for Germany, by initially 40 companies, led by Vorwerk's manager Timm Mittelsten Scheid. Among the participating companies are Oetker, Miele, Deichmann, Sartorius and Stihl.

In an interview, Michael Weber of Initiating Vorwerk company said that "we are convinced that Diversity and Inclusion are essential for our economic success", adding that "It is our shared responsibility to ensure that our country's prosperity remains secure in the future in the interests of all people. Without the necessary diversity of ideas and expertise, innovation will be hampered and competitiveness jeopardised in the long term." In a discussion with the Welt am Sonntag, Weber said that, while the initiative is political engagement, it will not give a specific voting recommendation.

== Reactions by far-right politicians ==
On an election rally in Sömmerda, Leader of the Thuringian AfD Björn Höcke, who often presents himself as a speaker of the middle class, called the campaign hypocrisy and said that he hoped that the companies behind the campaign would face “severe, severe economic turbulence”.

On 24 August 2024 shortly after the Solingen stabbing, AfD politician Maximilian Krah tweeted an image of the stabbing's site overlaid with the campaign's logo, titled "Fest der Vielfalt, #Solingen." lit. 'Festival of diversity, #Solingen.'

Responding to attacks by AfD politicians, Andreas Sennheiser, vice-CEO of Sennheiser said that "I find all these curses from the AfD revealing in more ways than one. And we will certainly not “shut up”: What they have in mind politically is anti-business".
