= Kate McLennan =

Australian comedian, writer, & actor (born c.1980)

- Born: Katherine McLennan; 1980 (age 45–46); Mortlake, Victoria, Australia
- Notable work: The Katering Show; Get Krack!n; Deadloch
- Children: 1

Comedy career
- Medium: Stand-up comedian, writer, actor
- Genres: observational comedy, character comedy, parody and satire

Kate McLennan (born c. 1980) is an Australian comedian, writer and actor. McLennan has performed in Australia and internationally, including at the Edinburgh Festival Fringe. She is known in Australia for her work on television and web series such as The Katering Show, Get Krack!n, The Mansion, and Deadloch (2023). She produces most of her work with Kate McCartney, which has led to their being dubbed the Kates.

== Early life ==
McLennan was born around 1980. She moved to Geelong at the age of ten, and a decade later she moved to Melbourne.

== Career ==
McLennan performed in her first sketch comedy show at the age of 21 at the 2001 Melbourne Fringe Festival, and appeared in the Fringe parade.

She rose to fame writing and performing her solo comedy show The Debutante Diaries, which won her the Best Comedy Award and Best Emerging Artist Award at the Melbourne Fringe in 2006.

McLennan co-created the web series Bleak with Kate McCartney in 2010, which in won the Kit Denton Disfellowship for Courage and Excellence in Performance Writing at the 2011 AWGIE Awards, worth A$30,000.

Since then, "the two Kates" have worked together a lot. McLennan and McCartney formed their production company called Lead Balloon TV. They wrote, produced and starred as an intolerable foodie (McLennan) and a food intolerant (McCartney) in a cooking-based web series called The Katering Show which screened on their YouTube channel in 2014. A second season of The Katering Show was screened on the ABC TV and then on ABC iview in 2016.

In 2017, McLennan and McCartney collaborated on an ABC Television comedy called Get Krack!n, playing exaggerated versions of themselves as breakfast show TV hosts, which screened on ABC iview and in the U.S. Get Krack!n ran for two seasons of eight episodes each, with the final episode going to air in April 2019, with Aboriginal actors and writers Miranda Tapsell and Nakkiah Lui given the stage to make strong statements about racism in Australia.

In June 2023 an eight-part crime comedy McLennan worked on with McCartney entitled Deadloch and starring Kate Box premiered on Amazon Prime Video. The series was a worldwide hit, reaching the top 10 on Prime in over 165 countries, including the UK and the US. The second series, set in the Top End, premiered on Amazon on 20 March 2026.

== Personal life ==
McLennan has a daughter.

== Awards and nominations ==
=== Screenwriting ===
Year	Award	Category	Work	Result	Role	Ref.
2011	Kit Denton Disfellowship	For Courage and Excellence in Performance Writing	Bleak (web-series)	Won	Shared with Kate McCartney	

=== Stand-up Comedy ===
Year	Award	Category	Work	Result	Role	Ref.
2006	Melbourne Fringe Festival	Best Comedy Award	The Debutante Diaries	Won	Writer, performer	
2006	Melbourne Fringe Festival	Best Emerging Artist Award	The Debutante Diaries	Won	Writer, performer	
2007	SA Theatre Guide	Best Comedy Award	The Debutante Diaries	Nominated	Writer, performer	
2007	Short+Sweet Festival	Best Actress	All The Way to the Top	Nominated	Writer, performer	
2007	Melbourne International Comedy Festival	Barry Award for Best Show	The Debutante Diaries	Nominated	Writer, performer	
2011	The Age	M-IE Award for Rising Comedy Star	The Debutante Diaries	Won	Writer, performer	
2013	Melbourne International Comedy Festival	Golden Gibbo Award for Best Show	Standard Double	Nominated	Writer, performer	
2024	13th AACTA Awards	Best Screenplay in Television	Deadloch (Episode 1)	Won	Co-writer	

== Stand-up comedy tours ==
Year	Title	Notes	Role
2002	The Hindsight Prophecies	Melbourne International Comedy Festival	Writer / performer
2002	The Six	Melbourne International Comedy Festival	Writer / performer
2002	The 666	Melbourne International Comedy Festival	Writer / performer
2003	Total Entertainments	Melbourne Fringe Festival	Writer / performer
2005	Henpecked	Melbourne International Comedy Festival	Writer / performer
2006	The Wrong Night	Melbourne International Comedy Festival	Writer / performer
2006; 2007	The Debutante Diaries	Melbourne Fringe Festival / Edinburgh Festival Fringe	Writer / performer
2007	The Enthusiasts	Melbourne International Comedy Festival	Writer / performer
2008	Beaconsfield: the Musical	Melbourne International Comedy Festival	Writer / performer
2010	I Coulda Been a Sailor	Melbourne International Comedy Festival	Writer / performer
2011	Homeward Bound	Melbourne Fringe Festival	Writer / performer
2012	Comedy Festival Roadshow	Melbourne International Comedy Festival	Writer / performer
2013	Standard Double	Melbourne International Comedy Festival	Writer / performer

== Filmography ==
=== Film ===
Year	Title	Role	Notes
2007	All The Way to the Top	Hayley	Actor
2009	Four Minutes of Fame	Karla Tutt	Actor
2010	Kwik Fix	Samara	Actor

=== Television ===
Year	Title	Role	Notes
2003	Stingers	Melissa	1 episode
2003	MDA	Fan	1 episode
2005	Let Loose Live	Writer / actor	2 episodes
2007–2011	Dogstar	Simone (voice)	52 episodes
2008	The Mansion	Writer / actor	13 episodes
2010	Offspring	Café girl	1 episode
2011	Ben Elton Live from Planet Earth	Actor	3 episodes
2012	Exchange Student Zero	Charity (voice)	1 episode
2012	Live on Bowen	Herself	1 episode
2013	It's a Date	Jessica	1 episode
2013	SlideShow	Herself	1 episode
2013	You're Skitting Me	Writer	13 episodes
2013–2014	Comedy Up Late	Herself	2 episodes
2014	House Husbands	Skye	1 episode
2014–2015	The Flamin' Thongs	Narelle Thong	26 episodes
2014–2015	Winners and Losers	Kathryn Piper	3 episodes
2015	Little Lunch	Writer	2 episodes
2015	Sammy J & Randy in Ricketts Lane	Megan	1 episode
2015	Comedy Showroom – Bleak	Anna O’Brien / writer	1 episode
2015	Slumber Party	Writer	1 episode
2015	In The Zone IV	Herself	1 episode
2016	The Katering Show	Herself / writer / producer	Season 2, 8 episodes
2016	Dogstar: Christmas in Space	Simone Clark / Celeste Sharp (voices)	1 episode
2017	Have You Been Paying Attention?	Herself / Guest Quiz Master	1 episode
2017	Shaun Micallef's Mad as Hell	Herself	1 episode
2017–2019	Get Krack!n	Herself / writer / producer	16 episodes
2010	Wakkaville	Missy (voice)	26 episodes
2018	Sando	Writer	6 episodes
2018	Talkin' 'Bout Your Generation	Herself	1 episode
2019	Hughesy, We Have a Problem	Herself	1 episode
2019	Celebrity Name Game	Herself	1 episode
2023–	Deadloch	Creator / writer	16 episodes (as of March 2025)

=== Web series ===
Year	Title	Role	Notes
2014	Bleak – The Web Series	Writer / Actor (Anna)	4 episodes
2015	The Katering Show	Writer / Producer / Herself	Season 1, 6 episodes
