= Kobald =

Kobald may refer to:

- Kobald (wrestler), American professional wrestler
- Christoph Kobald (born 1997), Austrian professional footballer

== See also ==
- Kobold, sprite from Germanic folklore
- Cobalt, chemical element
