= Nakkiah Lui =

Australian actor, writer and comedian

- Born: Australia
- Occupations: Actor, writer, comedian
- Notable work: Black Comedy, Kill The Messenger, Black Is The New White

Nakkiah Lui is an Indigenous Australian (Gamilaroi/Torres Strait Islander) actor, writer, and comedian. She is known for her work on television in Black Comedy, Kiki and Kitty (2017); Get Krack!n (2017–2019); and Preppers (2021). She has also appeared on radio, been a regular columnist for Australian Women's Weekly, and acted on stage in numerous plays, including Black is the New White, which was written by her, in 2017.

== Career ==
Lui is co-writer and star of Black Comedy, a sketch comedy television program on the ABC.

From 2012 to 2014 she was playwright-in-residence for Sydney's Belvoir Theatre and in 2013 she was the artist-in-residence for the Griffin Theatre. Her work includes: This Heaven (2013), I Should Have Told You Before We Made Love (That I’m Black) (2012), Blackie Blackie Brown: The Traditional Owner of Death (2013), Kill the Messenger (2015) and Power Plays (2016).

Lui has been a columnist for Australian Women's Weekly and has also hosted ABC Radio National's Awaye, and NAIDOC Evenings for ABC Local Radio. She has appeared on Q+A, The Drum and Screen Time on ABC.

In 2017, Lui was on the program to appear in four events at the 2017 Brisbane Writers Festival in Brisbane, Queensland. The same year, Lui wrote and starred in Kiki and Kitty (2017) a comedy series on ABC iview and ABC Comedy.

Teaming up with Indigenous Australian actress Miranda Tapsell, Lui and Tapsell hosted the BuzzFeed podcast Pretty for an Aboriginal (2017).

Lui's play Black is the new White, was staged in 2017 at the Sydney Theatre Company. The play was extended to a second season in 2018. Blackie Blackie Brown: The Traditional Owner of Death is Lui's second play in the 2018 season at the Sydney Theatre Company and in co-production with Malthouse Theatre. The play contains illustrations by Barkindjii, Birri-Gubba artist Emily Johnson, visual animation by Oh Yeah Wow and directed by Declan Greene. This production was awarded a $40,000 grant from the Australia Council production grant in 2014.

In 2019, Lui co-wrote, and appeared in, along with Miranda Tapsell, the last episode of the second series of Get Krack!n. It trended on Twitter, and was widely lauded as hilarious, ground-breaking, hard-hitting satire. It drew an angry response from right-wing commentator Andrew Bolt.

In 2021, she co-wrote and starred (as Charlie) and Preppers (2021).

== Recognition and awards ==
Lui has been regarded as a young leader in the Aboriginal Australian community.

In 2012, Lui was the first recipient of the Dreaming Award by The Aboriginal and Torres Strait Island Arts Board of the Australia Council and was the inaugural recipient of the Balnaves Foundation Indigenous Playwright Award.

In 2014, Lui was awarded the Malcolm Robertson Prize and a Green Room Award for Best Independent Production.

In 2015 she was joint winner of the NSW Philip Parsons Fellowship for Emerging Playwrights, for Kill the Messenger.

Lui received the Nick Enright Prize for playwriting in the 2018 New South Wales Premier's Literary Awards for Black is the New White. She won the 2021 Russell Prize for humour writing for the same work.

In 2019, Lui was the subject of a painted portrait by Sydney-based artist Laura Jones, which was a finalist for the Archibald Prize that year.

Preppers was nominated for Best Narrative Comedy Series, and Lui for Best Comedy Performer, at the 2021 AACTA Awards.

== Personal life ==
Lui is a Gamilaroi/Torres Strait Islander woman and was living in Sydney in 2018.

== Works ==
=== Plays ===
- I Should Have Told You Before We Made Love (That I’m Black) (2012)
- This Heaven (2013)
- Blackie Blackie Brown: The Traditional Owners of Death (2013)
- Kill the Messenger (2015)
- Power Plays (2016)
- Black is the New White (2017)
- How to Rule the World (2019)
- My Dreaming, Our Awakening (first radio play on ABC's AWAYE program)

=== TV shows ===
- Black Comedy (co-writer and star)
- Kiki and Kitty (2017)
- Get Krack!n (2017–2019)
- Preppers (2021)

=== Films ===
- From Drag King to Law Queen
- BabyGirl
