= Kobold (vacuum cleaner) =

German vacuum cleaner brand

- Product type: Cleaning equipment and accessories
- Current owner: Vorwerk
- Produced by: Vorwerk
- Country: Germany
- Introduced: 25 May 1930; 96 years ago
- Website: vorwerk.com

Kobold is the German brand of the Wuppertal-based company Vorwerk for its cleaning appliances, specifically for floor, hand and cordless vacuum cleaners, robotic vacuum cleaners and window vacuum cleaners.

== Product range, sales and markets ==
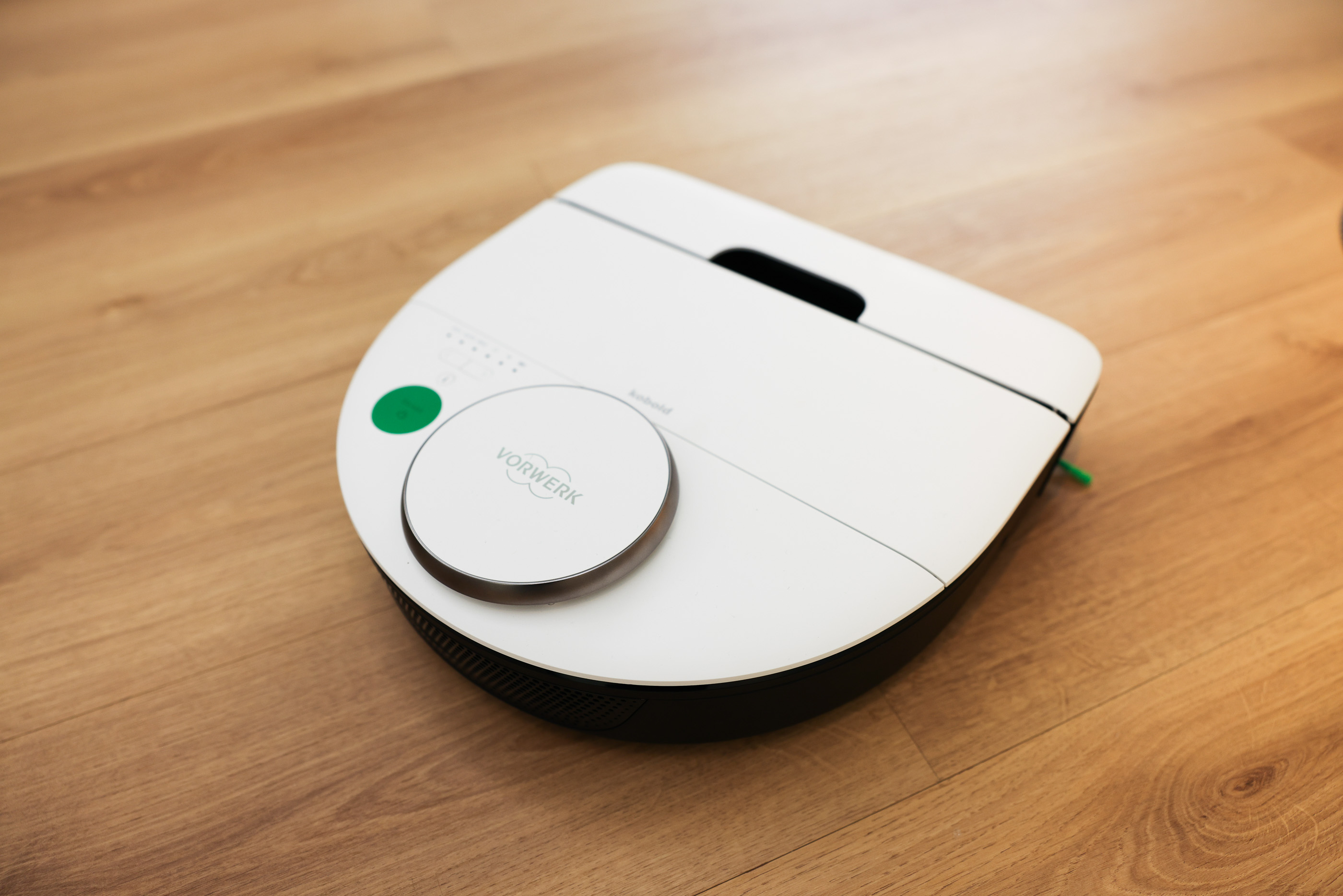
Robot vacuum cleaner (2023 model)

Under the Kobold brand, Vorwerk offers four types of cleaning appliances that are primarily used in households:

- corded vacuum cleaners.
- cordless vacuum cleaners
- robotic vacuum cleaners
- mini or handheld vacuum cleaners and window vacuums cleaners

For decades, Vorwerk offered Kobold products exclusively through direct sales. Since 2011 there have also been dedicated online stores, special online demonstrations and stores. Kobold is represented in some European and Asian countries with its own national companies; in other countries, contractual partners, so-called distributors, are responsible for sales. Italy is considered the most important foreign market. There, where the products are called Folletto (from the name with which Vorwerk established itself the first subsidiary in the country in 1938), Vorwerk sells the most appliances, in 2023 it was almost one in two.

== History ==
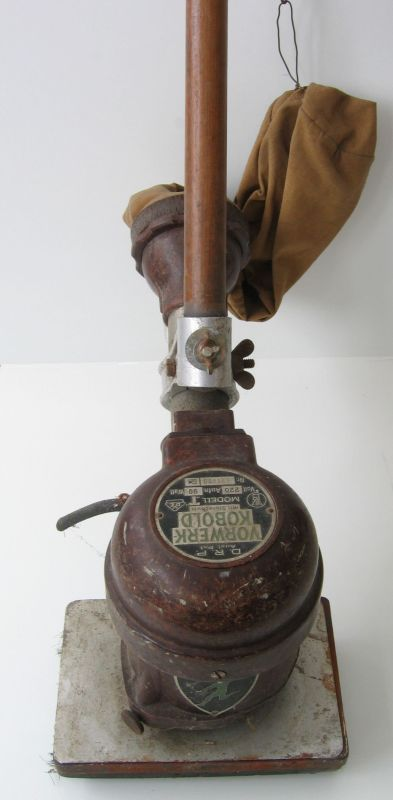
Model of 1935

The spread of radio stations and broadcast radio receivers in the 1920s led to a slump in sales of gramophones, which also affected Vorwerk as a manufacturer of gramophone motors. Vorwerk's chief engineer turned the gramophone motor into an electric hand vacuum cleaner, the Kobold. The appliance was reduced to the essentials: Motor, dust bag and handle. The patent for the Kobold "Model 30" was granted on 25 May 1930.

Sales initially remained unsatisfactory, as the relatively low price of the appliance did not particularly motivate retailers to explain and demonstrate the use of the new appliance, which required explanation. It was only the introduction of direct sales that ensured a breakthrough on the German market. From 1930 to 1935, 100,000 Kobold appliances were sold, and by 1937 the figure had risen to half a million. Even before the start of World War II, Vorwerk founded its first foreign subsidiary in Italy. In the 1930s, Vorwerk added accessories to the Kobold, for example devices for drying hair or grooming horses' coats.

The range of accessories was expanded extensively after the war. From the 1950s onwards, Vorwerk set up subsidiaries, agencies and sales offices abroad, for example in the United States, South America and Japan. In 1953, the threshold of one million Kobold appliances produced was exceeded. In 1953, the Kobold was also given the typical green and white colors of the time. In 1973, the 10 million mark was reached, in 1989 the 50 million mark. In 2011, Vorwerk launched the Kobold robot vacuum cleaner, three years later the window vacuum cleaner, and in 2018 the cordless vacuum cleaner.

From 2016 to 2019, Vorwerk was the main sponsor and shirt sponsor of the Italian Serie A soccer club ACF Fiorentina. The team also wore shirts with the Folletto logo.

== Bibliography ==
- Battenfeld, Beate (1998). von Oppeln, Detlev (ed.). Kultstaubsauger Kobold: Der mit der Trockenhaube (in German). Berlin: Trescher Verlag. ISBN 3-928409-74-3. Includes examples and photos.
