= Get Krack!n =

2017–2019 Australian TV series

- Genre: Morning show; Comedy
- Created by: Kate McCartney; Kate McLennan
- Written by: Kate McCartney; Kate McLennan
- Directed by: Hayden Guppy
- Starring: Kate McCartney; Kate McLennan
- Country of origin: Australia
- Original language: English
- No. of series: 2
- No. of episodes: 16

Production
- Production locations: Melbourne, Victoria

Original release
- Release: 30 August 2017 – 27 March 2019

Related
- The Katering Show

Get Krack!n is an Australian comedy series which was created by and stars comedians Kate McCartney and Kate McLennan. The series is a satire of breakfast television and features McCartney and McLennan playing versions of themselves hosting Get Krack!n, a low-budget early-morning television programme.

The series premiered on ABC TV on 30 August 2017 in Australia, with the second following on 27 March 2019. Season 1 had its international release on YouTube on 14 November 2024, with the second season following in August 2026.

== Premise ==
Get Krack!n is a satirical comedy show that pokes fun at breakfast television shows. Kate McCartney and Kate McLennan play fictional versions of themselves hosting early-morning television show "Get Krack!n". McLennan is upbeat to the point of being irritating and unprofessional while McCartney is more realistic, but frequently tactless and socially awkward. The show is run on a shoestring budget, funded by commercial sponsors who manufacture and market questionable products. The production crew are either under-trained or employed as part of a prison work release programme, the show is constantly beset by technical problems, and the guests are unqualified "experts". McCartney and McLennan attempt to remain enthusiastic, but inadvertently reveal dysfunctional and sociopathic behaviour as things go wrong.

== Cast ==
=== Main / regular ===
- Kate McCartney as Kate
- Kate McLennan as Kate
- Bec Petraitis as Anne
- Kate Dehnert as Deanne / Kash Kock / Stork
- Andrea Powell as Show Announcer / Female Expert / Jacqui
- Charlotte Nicdao as Scarlett Nicdao
- Anne Edmonds as Helen Bidou
- Greg Larsen as various characters
- Tiama Martina as Sabrina
- Adam Briggs as Bekjut
- Matt Stewart as Ben
- Alistair Baldwin as Matthew
- Gillian Cosgriff as Breaker Woman
- Michelle Lim Davidson as Penny Kwan

=== Guests ===
- Aaron Chen as Beach Man
- Adam Hills as Joe Bigot
- Alicia Gardiner as Kirshen / Kirsten / Kristen
- Amy Lehpamer as Jane / Rachel
- Annabel Crabb as Reporter 1
- Anthony ‘Lehmo’ Lehmann as The Nut
- Celia Pacquola as Regan Jones
- Christie Whelan Browne as Jasmine Ray
- Darren Gilshenan as Harry Buttle
- Dave Lawson as Tommy
- Dave Thornton as Diggsy
- Deborah Mailman as Prime Minister Burney
- Debra Lawrance as Tikki Cheeseman
- Denise Scott as Margaret
- Elaine Crombie as Eloise Kroombe, businesswoman
- Emily Taheny as Rebecca Slaw / series vocalist
- Fiona O'Loughlin as Robyn
- Frank Woodley as Bike Delivery Guy
- Genevieve Morris as Marie Nash
- Hannah Gadsby as Self
- Isaiah Firebrace as Self
- Jean Kittson as Wendy
- John Howard as Bill Langham
- Jordan Raskopoulos as Self
- Judith Lucy as Self
- Justine Clarke as Self
- Kat Stewart as JoJo Balls
- Kate Jenkinson as Catherine McLeod
- Kate Mulvany as Skye
- Laura Wheelwright as Isla Bedford
- Lucy Durack as Self
- Madeleine West as Trudy Lane
- Marg Downey as McCartney's mum
- Matt Day as Brendan O'Hara
- Merrick Watts as Mark
- Meshel Laurie as Felicity Hogg
- Michala Banas as Rose Bailey
- Miranda Tapsell as Self
- Nakkiah Lui as Self
- Nazeem Hussain as Egg Bro
- Paul Kelly as Self
- Reg Gorman as Pete Stark
- Robyn Butler as Dr Malorie Naylor
- Roslyn Oades as Shopper's Corner Announcer
- Rove McManus as Michael O'Beefe
- Sam Neill as Self
- Sam Campell as Connor Bidou
- Shaun Micallef as Male Voiceover
- Susie Youssef as Dr Haddad / Egg Woman
- Toby Truslove as Hunter Jack
- Urzila Carlson as Cath

== Production ==
The comedy series Get Krack!n is a successor to the hit web series The Katering Show, both of which were created by and star "The Kates" (Kate McCartney and Kate McLennan). It was shot at 3am Australian Eastern Standard Time, to reach the United States in the middle of the morning the day before. McLennan said that it was intended to have a "mid-morning American talk-show vibe about it", and they wrote it to be accessible to both Australian and American audiences.

Both series were directed by Hayden Guppy.

== Release ==
Series One was broadcast at 9:30 pm each Wednesday on ABC TV in Australia, premiering on 30 August 2017. It was scheduled to screen on the streaming comedy platform Seeso in the US, but Seeso closed before it could be aired. It was also released on Apple TV.

Series Two premiered on ABC TV on 6 February 2019, with the series finale airing on 27 March 2019.

The first season had its international release on YouTube on 14 November 2024, with the second season following in August 2026.

== Reception ==
The series was well-received by critics. Craig Mathieson of The Age wrote of the first series: "The brilliant, brutal Get Krack!n is the finest satire ever put to air on Australian television... Co-creators, comedic actors and bickering hosts Kate McLennan and Kate McCartney have concocted a modern classic". Luke Buckmaster, in The Guardian, gave the show 4 stars out of 5, writing "Kate McCartney and Kate McLennan walk the line between lighthearted mockery and gallows humour in eye-wateringly funny morning show satire... Get Krack!n is a show of – and for – the times... They constantly mock privilege, with a clear understanding that they're pissing from inside the tent". The Guardian's Lauren Harris listed the show as one of the best shows on all streaming platforms in October 2017.

Helen Razer, writing in The Saturday Paper ("Nothing this persuasively funny will soon recur"), attempts to analyse "why one particular comedy is so damn funny", and looks at how they effectively satirise "the white knowledge class" - their own class, charting its decline.

Larissa Dubecki, in a review of the second series in The Sydney Morning Herald in January 2019, called the show "a deadly satire dressed in the fluff, glitter and improbable colour combinations of the pre-midday timeslot: acerbic and angry at times but sharp enough in its comedic aim to be snort-out-loud funny... It's about as funny as television gets".

The second series was similarly well reviewed. Allison Whittaker wrote in The Guardian: "At last, a comedy to suit our mutual panic that does more than placate or distract!... With season two, the terms have shifted".

The last episode of the second series of Get Krack!n, featuring Miranda Tapsell and Nakkiah Lui and co-written by Lui, trended on Twitter, and was widely lauded as hilarious, ground-breaking, hard-hitting satire. It drew an angry response from right-wing commentator Andrew Bolt. Marie Claire called it a "must-watch for all Austrlians". Allison Whittaker wrote in The Guardian: "Get Krack!n's season finale was the most nourishing despair I have felt in a long time... And in its finale, Get Krack!n showed us the grit-teeth, half-chortling nihilism of the colonised that has long governed the lives of Indigenous women like me, driven expertly by Miranda Tapsell and Nakkiah Lui, with Lui as co-writer".

== Episodes ==
Series	Episodes	Originally released	
Series	Episodes	First released	Last released
1	8	30 August 2017	18 October 2017
2	8	6 February 2019	27 March 2019

=== Season 1 (2017) ===
No. overall	No. in season	Title	Guest stars	Original release date	AUS. viewers (millions)
1	1	"Episode 1"	Sam Neill, Candy Bowers, Emily Taheny, Nazeem Hussain, Susie Youssef & Katie Robinson	30 August 2017	0.616
2	2	"Episode 2"	Anne Edmonds, Charlotte Nicdao, Emily Taylor, Adam Briggs, Michelle Lim Davidson, John Leary & Danielle Walker	6 September 2017	0.413
3	3	"Episode 3"	Adam Briggs, Madeleine Jevic, Rove McManus, Greg Larsen, Trevor Ashley & Beth Stelling	13 September 2017	0.521
4	4	"Episode 4"	Aunty Donna, Kat Stewart, Michelle Lim Davidson, Wes Snelling & Molly Daniels	20 September 2017	0.453
5	5	"Episode 5"	Jean Kittson, Adam Briggs, Bjorn Stewart, Anne Edmonds, Thomas Lorenzo & Greg Larsen	27 September 2017	0.447
6	6	"Episode 6"	Deborah Mailman, Charlotte Nicdao, Madeleine West, Anne Edmonds, Susan Carland & Robyn Butler	4 October 2017	0.354
7	7	"Episode 7"	Nakkiah Lui, Miranda Tapsell, Madison Torres-Davy, Urzila Carlson, Greg Larsen, Ming-Zhu Hii & Toby Truslove	11 October 2017	0.348
8	8	"Episode 8"	Christie Whelan Browne, Reg Gorman, Celia Pacquola, Katie Robinson & Paul F. Tompkins	18 October 2017	0.388

=== Season 2 (2019) ===
No. overall	No. in season	Title	Guest stars	Original release date	AUS. viewers (millions)
9	1	"Episode 1"	Justine Clarke, Isaiah Firebrace, Anne Edmonds & Fiona O'Loughlin	6 February 2019	0.261
10	2	"Episode 2"	Paul Kelly, Merrick Watts, Denis Moore & Genevieve Morris	13 February 2019	N/A
11	3	"Episode 3"	Adam Hills, Christie Dawes & Sisters Of Invention	20 February 2019	N/A
12	4	"Episode 4"	Anne Edmonds & Judith Lucy	27 February 2019	N/A
13	5	"Episode 5"	John Howard, Debra Lawrance & Darren Gilshenan	6 March 2019	N/A
14	6	"Episode 6"	Matt Day, Dave Thornton & Lehmo	13 March 2019	N/A
15	7	"Episode 7"	Anne Edmonds & Frank Woodley	20 March 2019	N/A
16	8	"Episode 8"	Miranda Tapsell & Nakkiah Lui	27 March 2019	N/A

== See also ==
- The Katering Show, an earlier series by the pair
