= Thermomix =

Kitchen appliance by Vorwerk

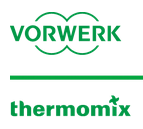
- Logo
- Inventor: Carl Vorwerk
- Inception: 1971
- Manufacturer: Vorwerk
- Current supplier: varies by country
- Website: thermomix.vorwerk.com

The Thermomix is a multi-purpose kitchen appliance of the Multicooker type made by Vorwerk. The current Thermomix has a heating element, a motor for fast or slow blending and stirring, and a weighing scale. The functions can be accessed simultaneously to carry out steaming, emulsifying, blending, precise heating, mixing, milling, whipping, kneading, chopping, weighing, grinding and stirring. The 2014 Thermomix TM5 also has a touchscreen with a guided mode which allows the user to follow recipes step by step.

Thermomix is a hybrid word derived from thermo- ('heating', from Greek θερμός thermós 'hot') and mix. In Italy and Portugal, it is sold under the trademark Bimby.

== History ==
The Thermomix was derived from a mixer series from Vorwerk originally called "VKM5", in 1961. It had seven functions: stirring, kneading, chopping, grating, mixing, milling and juicing. The justification for the development of the heating element comes from the managing director of Vorwerk France, who, around 1970, came up with the idea of designing a machine that could simultaneously blend and cook, to make thickened soups and baby food, popular in France. In 1971, the original Thermomix VM 2000 was launched on the market – first in France, later in Spain and Italy.

The bright orange VM 2200 followed, with the ability to keep dishes hot or cold. The TM3300, the first version named "Thermomix", was released in 1985, with a white finish and having the mixing bowl lower than the previous model.

The next model, the Thermomix TM21, was released in 1996, with a bigger bowl, integrated weighing scale and a more modern appearance. TM5 incorporates digital technologies, and allows "guided cooking" using proprietary memory chips to provide settings and cooking instructions, and a touch screen instead of the buttons and knobs of previous models.

The chronology of Thermomix models is as follows:

The two models of Thermomix produced by Vorwerk in the 2010s
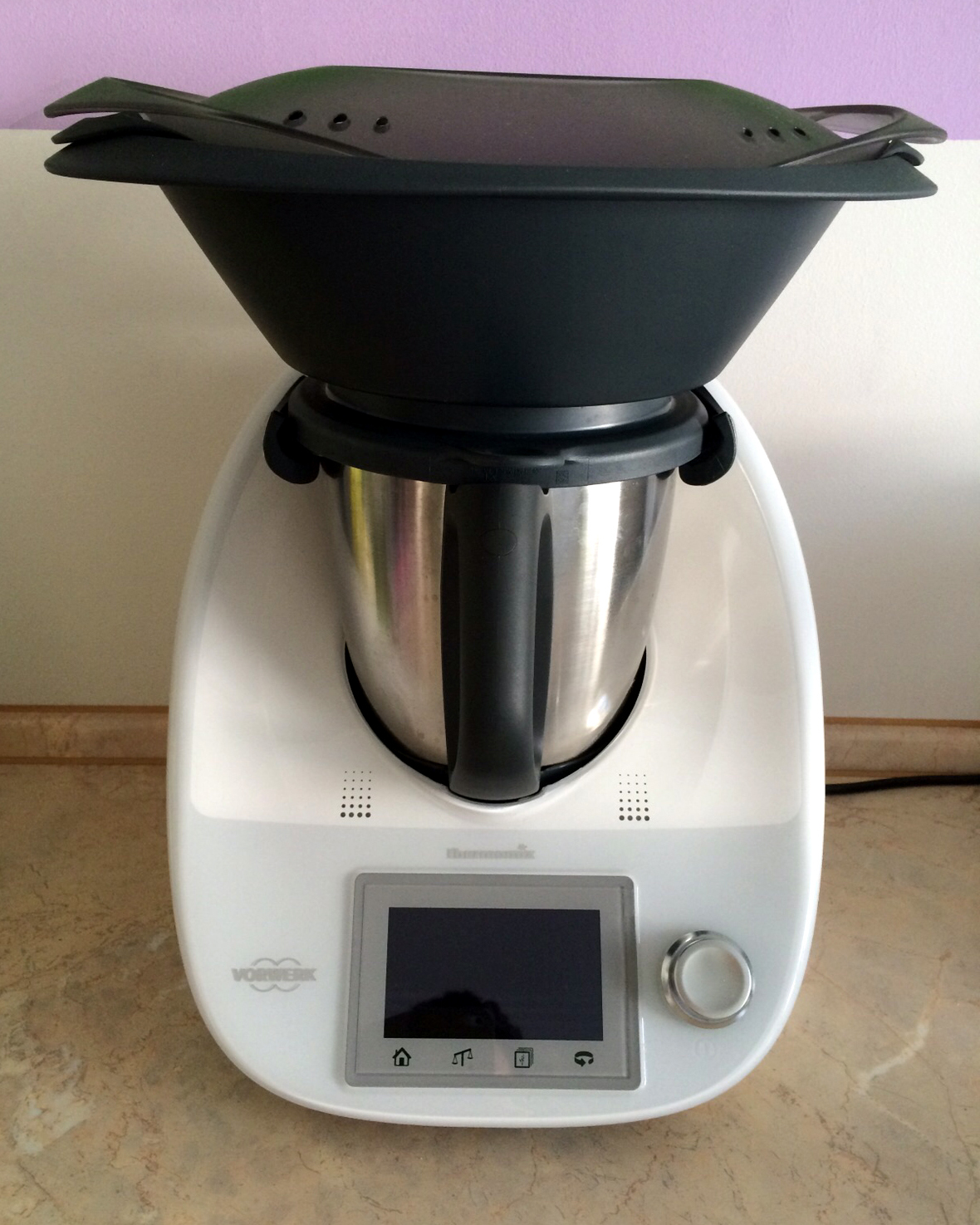
Thermomix TM5 (2014)

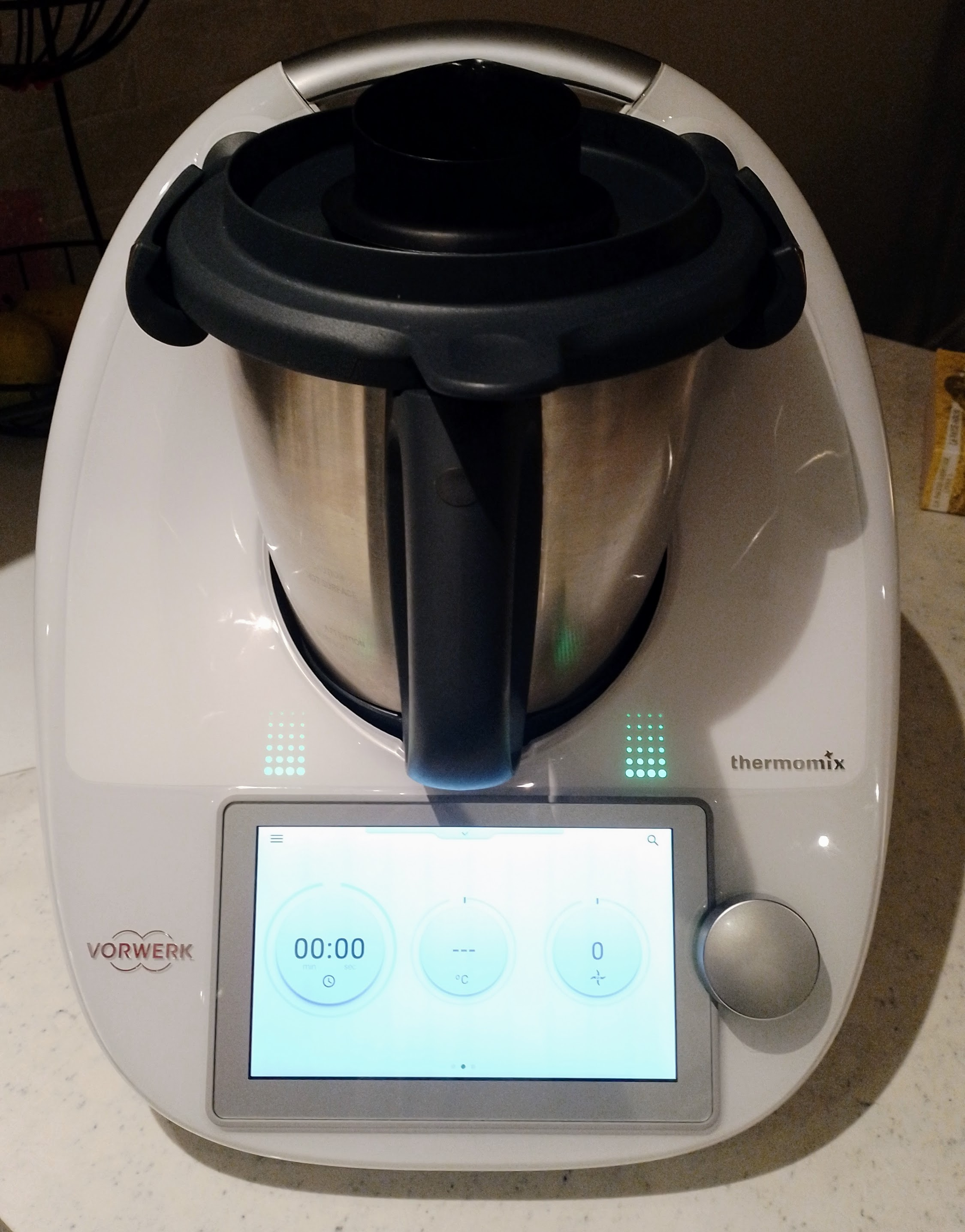
Thermomix TM6 (2019)
1. VKM5 (1961)
2. VM 10 (1960s)
3. VM 2000 (1971)
4. VM 2200 (1977)
5. Thermomix TM 3000 (1980)
6. Thermomix TM 3300 (1982)
7. Thermomix TM 21 (1996)
8. Thermomix TM 31 (2004)
9. Thermomix TM 5 (2014)
10. Thermomix TM 6 (2019)
11. Thermomix TM 7 (2025)

75% of the machines sold are made in Cloyes-sur-le-Loir, France, and the rest in Wuppertal-Laaken, Germany. Both factories have been expanded.

== Features ==
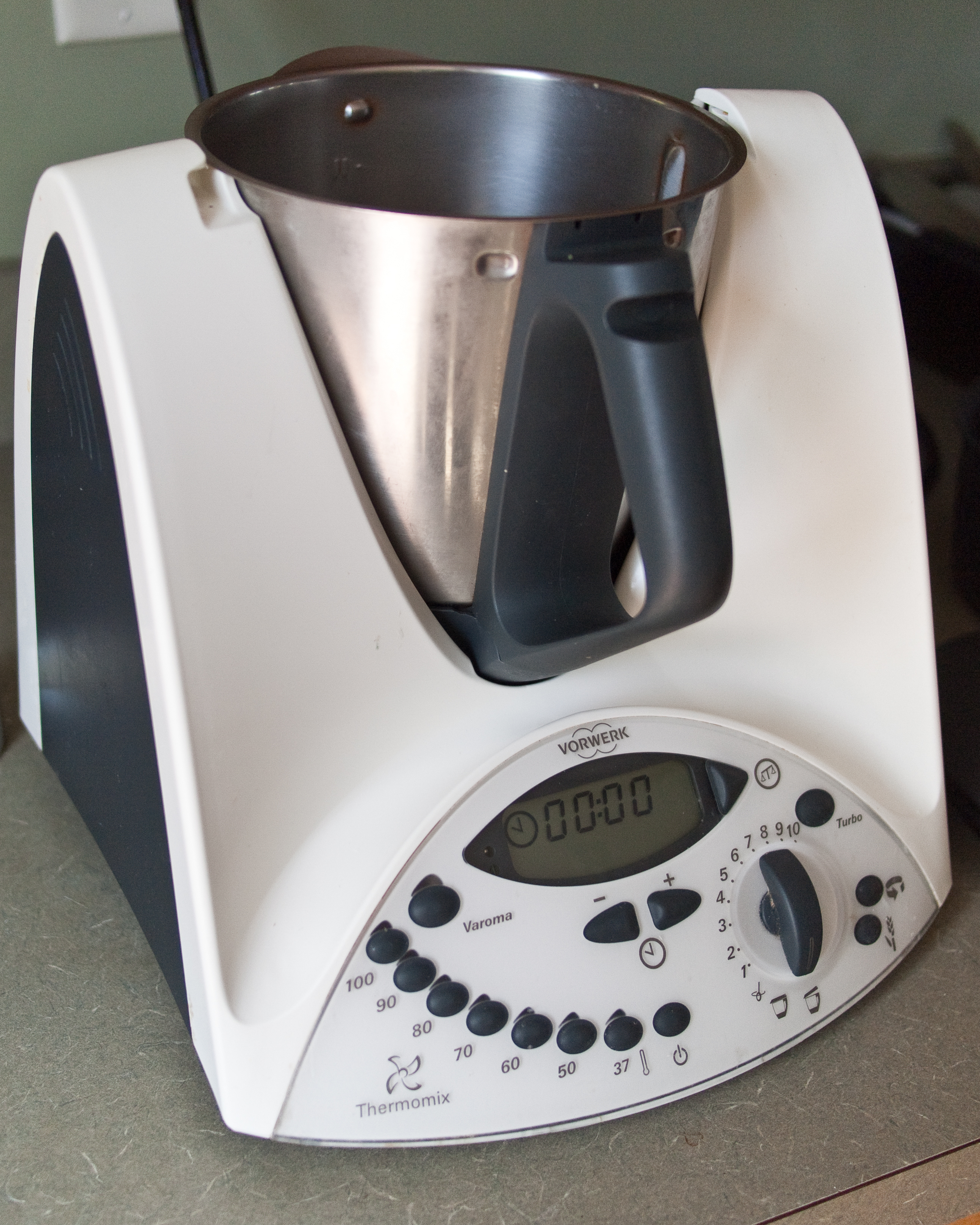
Thermomix TM 31 (2004)

The Thermomix differs from ordinary blenders and food processors in having a thermostatically controlled heating element with a range of 37 °C (99 °F) to 120 °C (248 °F) in the TM5 model (and 100 °C (212 °F) in the TM31, and previous models), a timer, and a built-in scale for weighing directly into the appliance.

The price at launch in its home country was €1,139.

== Marketing and distribution ==
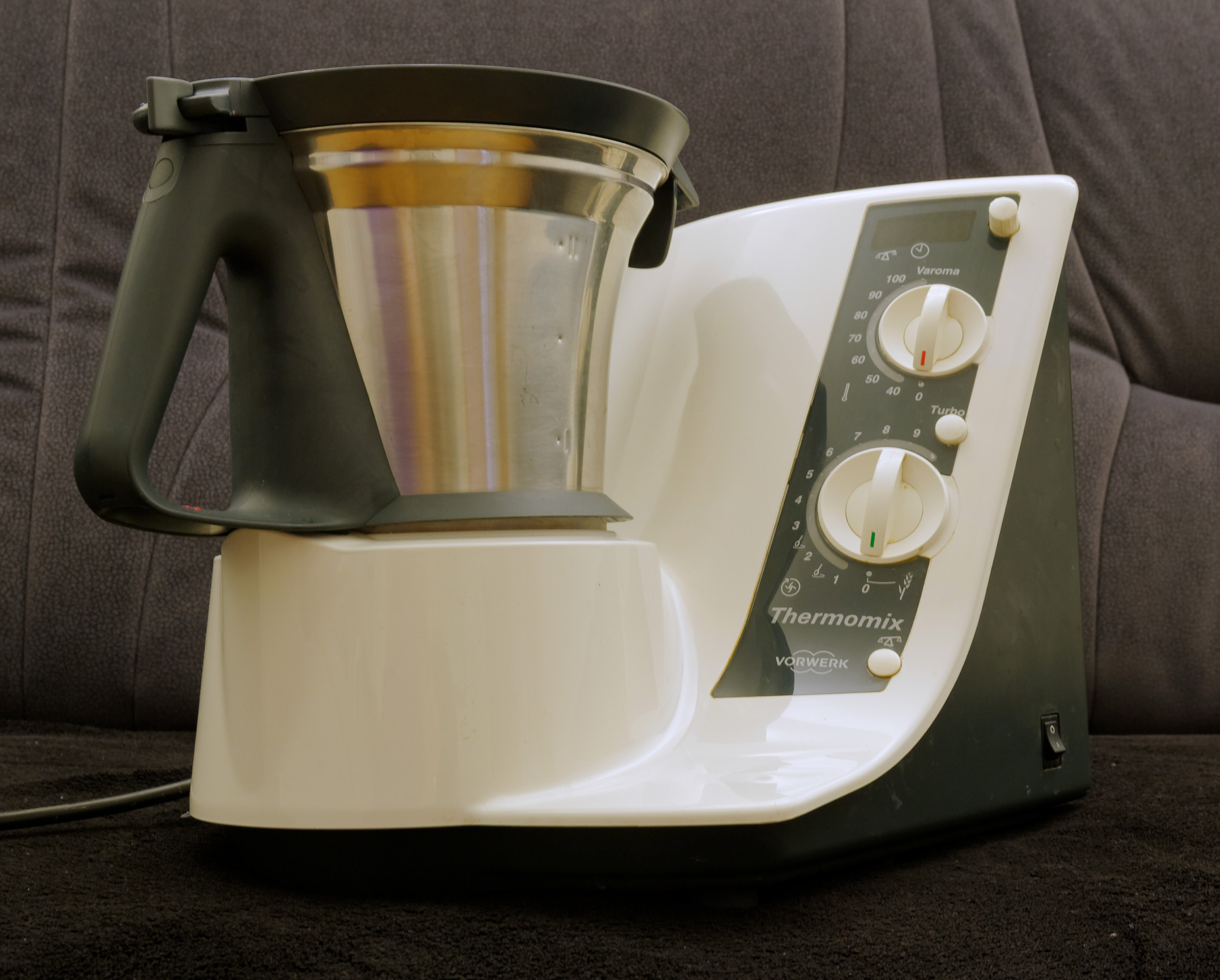
Thermomix TM 21 (1996)

The Thermomix is sold through direct sales by a sales force of "Thermomix consultants", who are encouraged to recruit other consultants to work under them. The Guardian said the approach "resembles multilevel marketing".

Vorwerk claims that the appliance may be used to prepare complete meals with no need for advanced culinary knowledge.

== Models ==
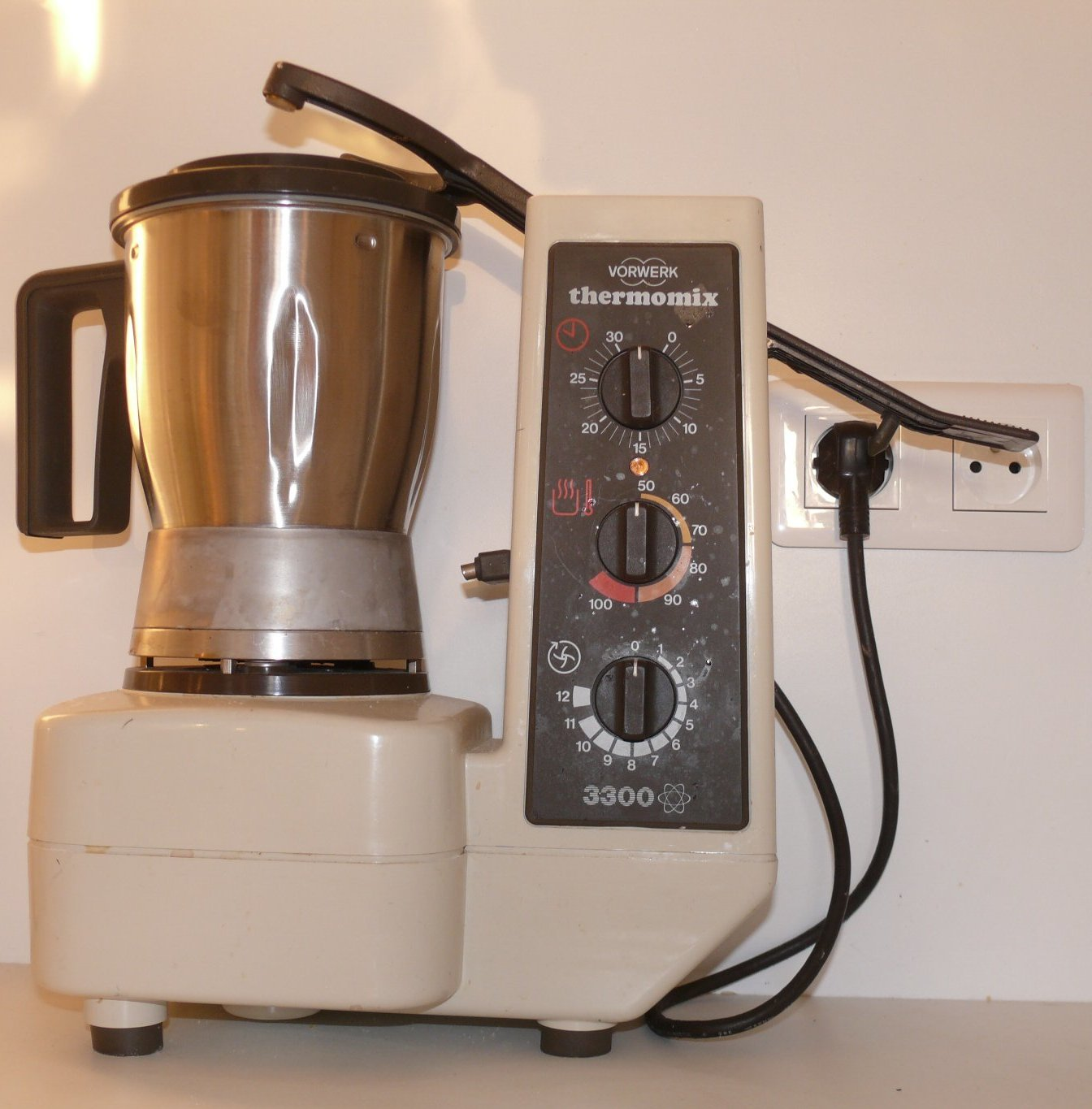
Thermomix TM 3300 (1982)

The TM6 was announced in March 2019 and has a number of new features including slow cooking, fermentation and sous vide.

The TM5 is a digital machine. It can be purchased with an optional ‘Cook-Key’ WiFi add-on, which allows access to a subscription-based online recipe catalogue. The TM5 is equipped with guided cooking. The user interface is accessed through a touch screen, as opposed to the previous model’s buttons. According to the producer, the TM5 also has a less noisy motor, a larger mixing bowl, a new steamer, a higher maximum temperature of 120 °C (248 °F), and support for online recipes.

In the TM31, recipes can only be followed manually by operating the machine with push buttons, without the guided recipe feature of the newer model. However, it can do many of the same things as the TM5.

== Reviews ==
In 2010, Stiftung Warentest rated the model TM 31 with mark 3.2 (satisfactory). The price of 985 euro, the high noise level, and the lack of grating and slicing functionality was criticised. The successor model TM 5 was rated in 2015 with mark 2.9 (satisfactory). The noise level (measured at 91 decibel) was again criticised, and the testers said that this was the reason why it was rated down.

In 2014, Vorwerk was awarded a critical "Shonky Award" by the Australian consumer advocate Choice, for the "flawed launch of its new model".

In 2016, the TM5 was rated 4 out of 5 stars in C|Net and had a positive review on Wired.

In 2018, iFixit published a teardown of the Thermomix TM5. Without giving a repairability score, they praised the modular conception and criticized the poor accessibility of some connections.

== Safety ==
There have been numerous accounts of a Thermomix machine "exploding" and scalding people with hot liquids. In October 2014, the model was recalled over claims that hot liquid or food may splash out of the mixing bowl. The Australian consumer organisation Choice called for an Australian Competition & Consumer Commission (ACCC) investigation. In June 2017, the ACCC started court proceedings against the Australian Thermomix distributor, alleging that it breached Australian Consumer Law, failed to comply with mandatory reporting requirements for injuries, asked consumers to sign non-disclosure agreements, and made false and misleading statements about its 2014 recall.

Choice told the Australian Broadcasting Corporation (ABC) that it was aware of 87 cases where Thermomix consumers had been burned. The ABC understood that 18 of those required several weeks of treatment in hospital burns units.

In April 2018, Thermomix in Australia was handed a $4.6 million fine because they had violated consumer law by failing to report dangerous defects.

In 2014, Thermomix TM31 (12423100 to 14323199) was recalled in Australia. The ACCC issued recall notice 2014/14361 in October 2014. The sealing ring was identified as a point of possible failure in circumstances where the machine was operated at high speed and then switched to the lid open position. Vorwerk shipped all affected owners a replacement sealing ring in November 2014.
