= Entre dos aguas (album) =

Compilation album by Paco de Lucía

- 1981 reissue cover

Compilation album by Paco de Lucía
- Released: 1975
- Label: Phonogram

Paco de Lucía chronology
En vivo desde el teatro real	Entre dos aguas	Almoraima

Professional ratings
Review scores
Source	Rating
AllMusic	link

Entre dos aguas is the first compilation album by the Spanish guitarist and composer Paco de Lucía. It was originally published in 1975 by Phonogram Records on LP. It was reissued in 1981 by Universal Music Spain, with a substantially different track listing.

Original 1975 track listing

1. "Entre dos aguas"
2. "Los pinares"
3. "Jerezana"
4. "En la caleta"
5. "Punta del Faro"
6. "Fandangos"
7. "Malagueña de Lecuona"
8. "Zarda de Monty"
9. "Serrania de Málaga"
10. "Andalucía de Lecuona"
11. "Rumba improvisada"
12. "Plazuela"

1981 reissue track listing

1. "Entre dos aguas" (1973)
2. "Zorongo gitano" (1972)
3. "Río ancho" (1976)
4. "En la caleta" (1972)
5. "Convite" (1981)
6. "Monasterio de sal" (1981)
7. "Panaderos flamencos" (1969)
8. "Punta umbría" (1967)
9. "Chanela" (1981)
10. "La niña de Puerta Oscura" (1972)
11. "Castro marín" (1981)
12. "Gua'iras de Lucía" (1972)
13. "Mantilla de feria" (1969)
14. "El vito" (1972)

== Additional musicians ==
=== Original LP musicians ===
- Ramón de Algeciras – guitar on 1, 2, 6, 7, 8, 9, 10, 11, 12
- Jose Torregrosa – musical director on 5, 6
- Enrique Jimenez – guitar on 7, 8, 9, 10, 11, 12
- Cepero Isidro de Sanlucar – guitar on 7, 8, 9, 10, 11, 12
- Julio Vallejo – guitar on 7, 8, 9, 10, 11, 12

=== 1981 version musicians ===
- Ramón de Algeciras – guitar on 1, 3, 9, 10, 14
- Ricardo Modrego – guitar on 2
- Larry Coryell – acoustic guitar on 5
- Carles Benavent - bass on 6
