= Kate McCartney =

Australian comedian, writer, & actor

- Born: 1979 or 1980 (age 46–47); Perth, Western Australia
- Notable work: The Katering Show; Get Krack!n; Deadloch
- Partner(s): Sally Rugg (2022–present; engaged)
- Children: 1

Comedy career
- Medium: Stand-up comedian, writer, actor, illustrator
- Genres: observational comedy, character comedy, parody and satire

Kate McCartney (born 1979 or 1980) is an Australian comedian, writer, actor and illustrator. She is a frequent collaborator with Kate McLennan, which has led to their being dubbed the Kates.

== Early life ==
Kate McCartney was born in 1979 or 1980 in Perth, Western Australia, and moved to Melbourne with her family at the age of 10, where she grew up in Camberwell.

== Career ==
McCartney worked as a comedian and also worked in animation. Her television writing credits have included Big Bite, Hamish & Andy, Adam Hills Tonight, and Spicks and Specks.

She met Kate McLennan in 2011 after McLennan voiced a character in an animation for her. Due to the number of subsequent collaborations with McLennan, the pair have been dubbed "the Kates" in the media.

McCartney co-created the web series Bleak with McLennan in 2010, about being a single 30-something, which won the Kit Denton Disfellowship for Courage and Excellence in Performance Writing at the 2011 AWGIE Awards, worth A$30,000.

With McLennan, she created a cooking-based web series called The Katering Show which screened initially on their YouTube channel in 2014. A second season of The Katering Show was screened on the ABC TV and then on ABC iview in 2016.

In 2017, McCartney collaborated with McLennan for ABC Television to create the comedy Get Krack!n, in which they played breakfast show television presenters.

In 2021, they created Slushy, a workplace comedy set in the Australian Antarctic research base, that was available as a podcast on Audible.

McCartney and McLennan wrote the 2023 Amazon Prime Video series Deadloch starring Kate Box, which garnered positive reviews, and won McCartney a Best Television Script Writing Award and Box a Best Actress Award, at the AACTA Awards in February 2024. The series was a worldwide hit, reaching the top 10 on Prime in over 165 countries, including the UK and the US. The second series, set in the Top End, premiered on Amazon on 20 March 2026.

== Personal life ==
McCartney had a daughter, Millie, in early 2015.

In 2022, she became engaged to Sally Rugg. As of May 2023 McCartney was living in the Melbourne suburb of Preston.
