= Entre dos aguas (song) =

Composition by Paco de Lucía

- by Paco de Lucía
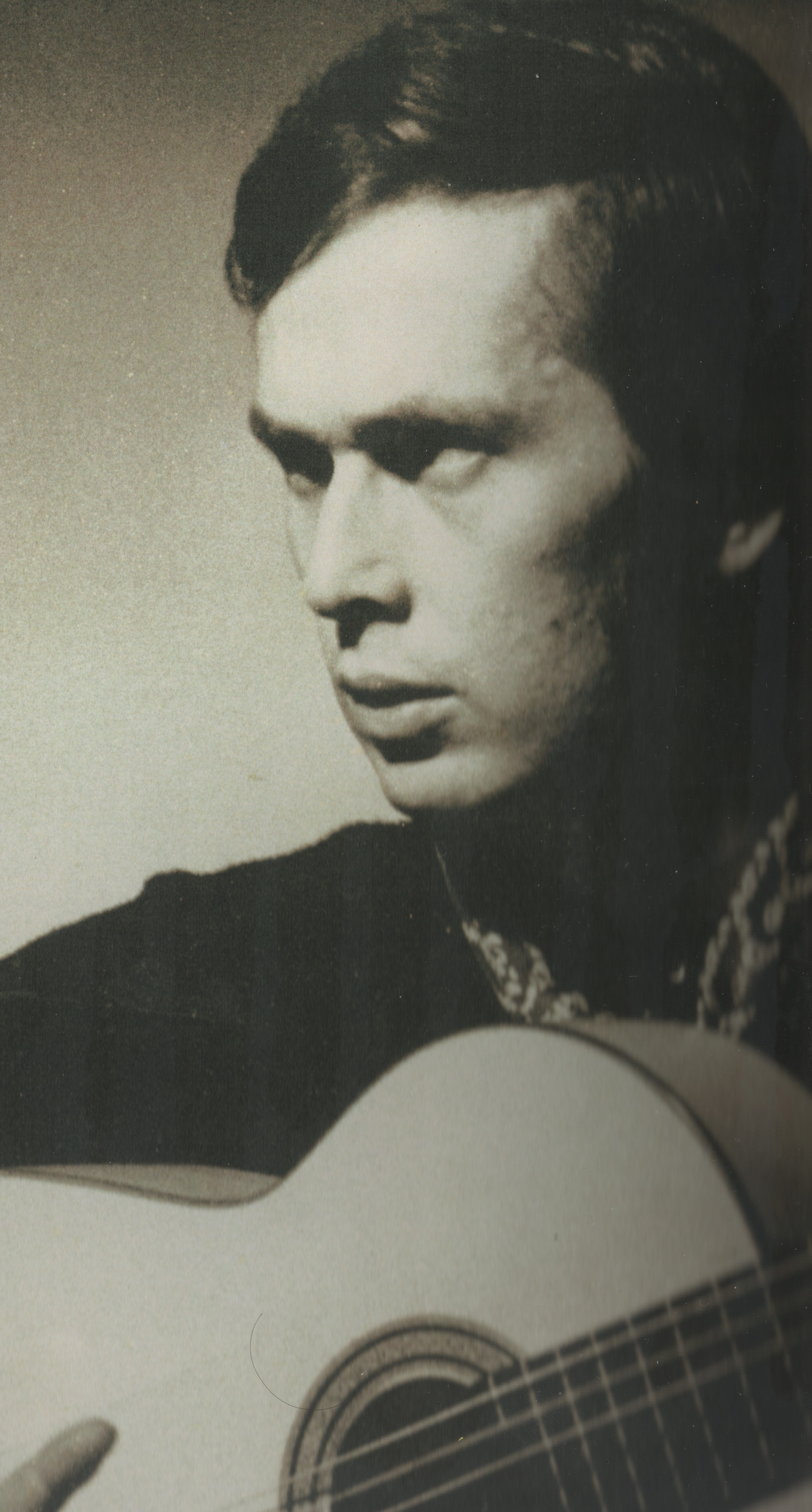
- Paco de Lucía around the year he composed "Entre dos Aguas"
- Genre: Flamenco
- Published: 1973

Sample of "Entre dos Aguas" played by Michael Laucke

"Entre dos Aguas" is an instrumental flamenco rumba created by the Spanish guitarist Paco de Lucía, included as the first single on the album Fuente y caudal (1973). It was recorded with two guitars (the second played by his brother Ramón de Algeciras), with a bass and a bongo played by Pepe Ébano instead of the traditional palmas played on the rumbas.

At first the album did not have much commercial success, being practically discontinued in a few months. But Jesús Quintero, de Lucía's representative at that time, and several other journalists were determined that "Entre dos Aguas" should be heard on the radio. They convinced the record company to edit it as a single, going on sale in 1974. As a single, "Entre dos Aguas" sold more than 300,000 copies, being certified Gold in 1976, and spent 22 weeks at the top of the sales charts, catapulting de Lucía's career. After the success of the song as a single, the label reedited the album Fuente y caudal in 1975, and it was released in cassette format in 1981 and in CD format in 1987. Likewise, the song was included in several compilations.

"Entre dos Aguas" was not a song written over time, but an improvisation that de Lucía was asked by producer José Torregrosa to perform at the time of recording, since he considered the album to be incomplete. Apparently, de Lucía used other references to improvise the song, such as the song "Te estoy amando locamente" by Las Grecas, as well as "Caramba, carambita" by Los Marismeños (which de Lucía co-wrote), where the similarity with the latter to "Entre dos aguas" can be seen more clearly.

A cover version was recorded by Armik in his 1995 Rain Dancer album.
