= Paco de Lucía discography =

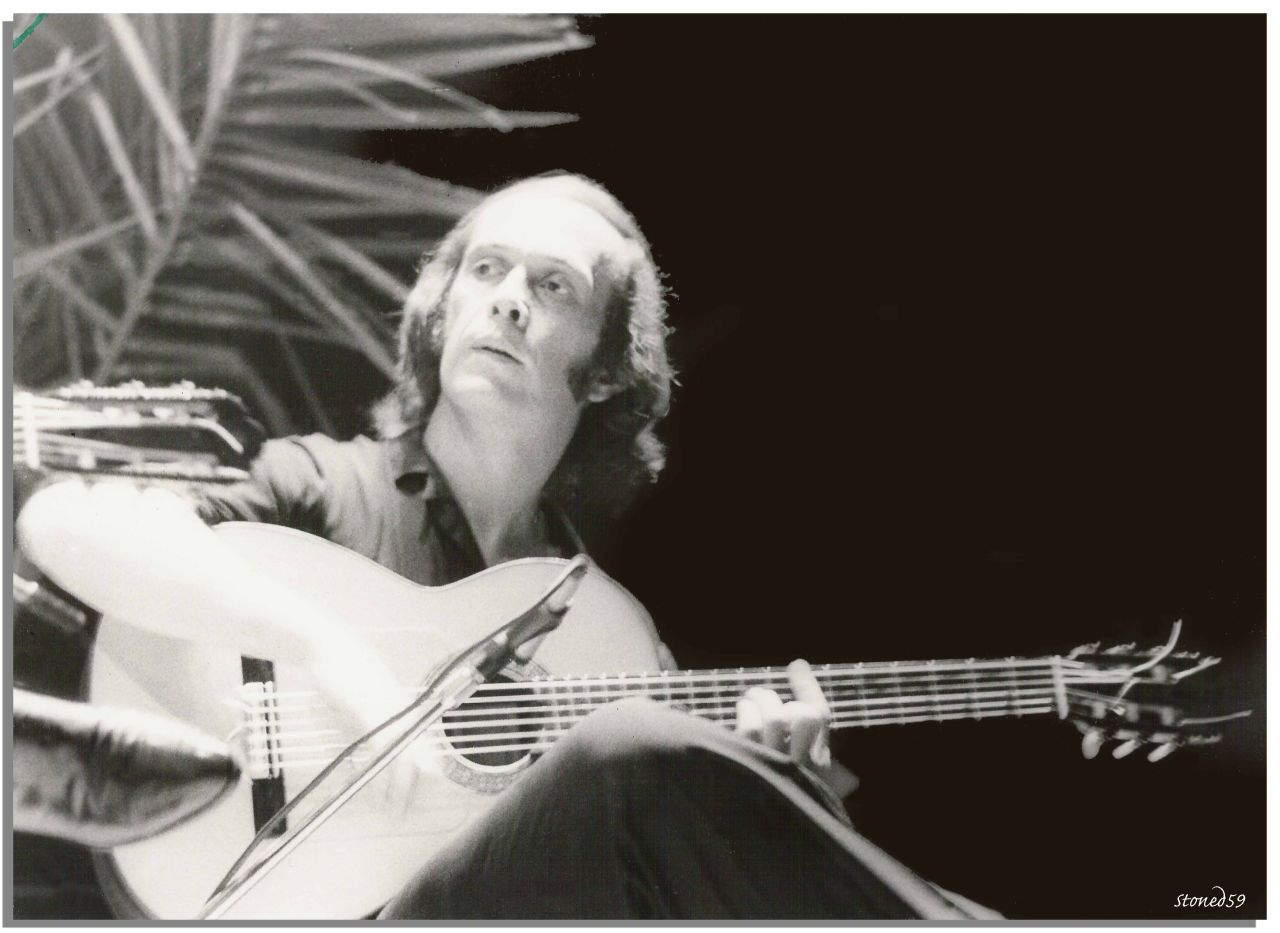
Paco de Lucía

The following is the discography of Spanish flamenco guitarist Paco de Lucía.

== Albums ==
=== Studio albums ===
Title	Album details	Peak chart positions			
Title	Album details	US World	SPA	BEL	FRA
La fabulosa guitarra de Paco de Lucía	Released: 1967; Label: Polygram Iberica; Formats: LP, CD	—	—	—	—
Fantasía flamenca de Paco de Lucía	Released: 1969; Label: Universal Music Spain; Formats: LP, CD	—	—	—	—
El mundo del flamenco	Released: 1971; Label: Polygram Iberica; Formats: LP, CD	—	—	—	—
Recital de guitarra de Paco de Lucía	Released: 1971; Label: Universal Music Spain; Formats: LP, CD	—	—	—	—
El duende flamenco de Paco de Lucía	Released: 1972; Label: Polygram Iberica; Formats: LP, CD	—	—	—	—
Fuente y caudal	Released: 1973; Label: Polygram Iberica; Formats: LP, CD	—	—	—	—
Almoraima	Released: 1976; Label: Polygram Iberica; Formats: LP, CD	—	—	—	—
Interpreta a Manuel de Falla	Released: 1978; Label: Polygram Iberica; Formats: LP, CD	—	—	—	—
Sólo quiero caminar with the Paco de Lucía Sextet	Released: 1981; Label: Phonogram; Formats: LP, CD, digital download	—	—	—	—
Siroco	Released: 2 April 1987; Label: Polydor; Formats: LP, CD, digital download	—	—	—	—
Zyryab	Released: 17 September 1990; Label: Polygram Ibérica; Formats: LP, CD, digital download	11	—	—	—
Concierto de Aranjuez	Released: 28 October 1991; Label: Polygram Iberica; Formats: LP, CD, digital download	—	39	—	—
Luzia	Released: 10 November 1998; Label: Polygram Iberica; Formats: LP, CD, digital download	15	—	—	—
Cositas buenas	Released: 26 January 2003; Label: Blue Thumb Records; Formats: LP, CD, digital download	—	37	53	77
Canción Andaluza	Released: 29 April 2014; Label: Universal Music Spain; Formats: LP, CD, digital download	—	1	—	—
"—" denotes a recording that did not chart or was not released in that territory.

=== Collaborative albums ===
Title	Album details	Peak chart positions				
Title	Album details	US	US Jazz	GER	AUT	FRA
Dos guitarras flamencas en stereo with Ricardo Modrego	Released: 1964; Label: Polygram Iberica; Formats: LP, CD, digital download	—	—	—	—	—
12 canciones de García Lorca para guitarra with Ricardo Modrego	Released: 1965; Label: Polygram Iberica; Formats: LP, CD, digital download	—	—	—	—	—
12 éxitos para 2 guitarras flamencas with Ricardo Modrego	Released: 1965; Label: Universal Music Spain; Formats: LP, CD, digital download	—	—	—	—	—
Canciones andaluzas para 2 guitarras with Ramón de Algeciras	Released: 1967; Label: Universal Music Spain; Formats: LP, CD, digital download	—	—	—	—	—
Dos guitarras flamencas en América Latina with Ramón de Algeciras	Released: 1967; Label: Universal Music Spain; Formats: LP, CD, digital download	—	—	—	—	—
Paco de Lucía y Ramón de Algeciras en Hispanoamérica with Ramón de Algeciras	Released: 1969; Label: Polygram Iberica; Formats: LP, CD, digital download	—	—	—	—	—
12 Hits para 2 guitarras flamencas y orquesta de cuerda with Ramón de Algeciras	Released: 1969; Label: Polygram Iberica; Formats: LP, CD, digital download	—	—	—	—	—
Castro Marín with Larry Coryell and John McLaughlin	Released: 1981; Label: Phonogram; Formats: LP, CD, digital download	—	—	—	—	—
Passion, Grace and Fire with Al Di Meola and John McLaughlin	Released: 1983; Label: Philips; Formats: LP, CD, digital download	171	9	35	—	—
The Guitar Trio with Al Di Meola and John McLaughlin	Released: 15 October 1996; Label: Verve Records; Formats: LP, CD, digital download	—	1	55	27	21
Paco and John Live at Montreux 1987 with John McLaughlin	Released: 24 June 2016; Label: Verycords; Format: LP, CD	—	—	—	—	—
"—" denotes a recording that did not chart or was not released in that territory.

=== Compilation albums ===
Title	Album details	Peak chart positions	
Title	Album details	POR	SPA
Entre dos aguas	Released: 1975; Label: Phonogram; Formats: LP, CD, digital download	—	3
Antología	Released: 1995; Label: Mercury Records; Formats: CD, digital download	24	—
Integral	Released: August 18, 2003; Label: Universal Music Spain; Formats: CD	—	—
Por Descubrir	Released: 18 August 2003; Label: Universal Music Spain; Formats: CD, digital download	—	—
"—" denotes a recording that did not chart or was not released in that territory.

=== Live albums ===
Title	Album details	Peak chart positions							
Title	Album details	SPA	US	US Jazz	GER	NLD	AUT	NZL	FRA
En vivo desde el Teatro Real	Released: 1975; Label: Polygram Iberica; Formats: LP, CD, digital download	—	—	—	—	—	—	—	—
Friday Night in San Francisco with Al Di Meola and John McLaughlin	Released: 10 August 1981; Label: Philips; Formats: CD, digital download	—	97	6	22	66	5	48	154
Live... One Summer Night The Paco de Lucía Sextet	Released: 1984; Label: Universal Music Spain; Formats: CD, digital download	—	—	—	—	—	—	—	—
Live in América The Paco de Lucía Sextet	Released: 1993; Label: Polygram Iberica; Formats: CD, digital download	—	—	—	—	—	—	—	—
En Vivo - Conciertos Live In Spain 2010	Released: 26 March 2012; Label: Universal Music Spain; Formats: CD, digital download	40	—	—	—	—	—	—	—
Paco and John Live at Montreux 1987 with John McLaughlin	Released: 24 June 2016; Label: Verycords; Format: LP, CD	—	—	—	—	—	—	—	—
Paco De Lucia – The Montreux Years	Released: 24 February 2023; Label: BMG; Format: LP, CD, download	—	—	—	—	—	—	—	—
"—" denotes a recording that did not chart or was not released in that territory.

=== Albums accompanying singers ===
Paco de Lucía was the lead guitarist accompanying singers on their albums, often with his name noted in the album's title.

- Flamenco Festival Gitano recorded 1966–1971
  - Volume 3 (L&R records L&R 44.015) (in cuadro) released 1986
  - Volume 4 (L& R Records L&R 12L0101 recorded 1969, released 1981
- El Chato de La Isla
  - (Polydor EP 334 FEP) 1966
  - Canta El Chato de la Isla 1967 (Fontana 701 968 WPY)
- Manuel Soto "El Sordera"
  - 1967 (Polydor 342 FEP)
- Gaspar de Utrera
  - 1967 (Polydor 341 FEP)
- El Sevillano
  - six Polydor EPs, 1967
  - El Sevillano con Paco de Lucía (1972 LP)
- El Lebrijano
  - EL Lebrijano: De Sevilla a Cádiz 1969 (Columbia LP CS 8002)
  - El Lebrijano con la Collaboración Especial de Paco de Lucía 1970 (Polydor 23 85 006)
- Juan de la Vara
  - 1970 (Hispavox EP 16/748)
- Enrique Montoya
  - 1971 (Discophon 3024)
- Niño de Barbate
  - Niño de Barbate con la Collaboración Especial de Paco de Lucía 1971 (TIP 24 56 016 and 24 56 017)
- Naranjito de Triana
  - Naranjito de Triana: A Triana 1971 (RCA Victor LPM 10 416)
- Pepe de Lucía
  - Pepe de Algeciras (Polydor 343), 1966 (malagueña "De Mi Larga Enfermedad", bulerías "Desterrado Me Fui Para El Sur", tientos "Pesaba Este Cuerpo Mío", soleá "La Muerte Pedía Yo")
  - El Mundo Flamenco de Paco de Lucia (Philips 63 28 025), 1971
  - Pepe de Lucia y Paco de Lucia (Triumph S 249 6202), 1972
  - Caminando (Polydor 813 488-1), 1983
  - El Orgullo De Mi Padre (Nuevos Medios NM 15 686 CD), 1995
- Fosforito 1968–1972
  - EPs: Belter 52 190, 52 275, 52 361, 52 365
  - LPs: Belter 22 219, 22 360, 22 362, 22 587, 22 588
  - Fosforito: Selección Antológica (Belter 75.012, 75.013, 75.014, 75.015, re-released on 2-CD set as Fosforito con Paco de Lucía, Selección Antológica del Cante Flamenco, Iris Music France B00005MH91)
- Antonio Mairena
  - Antonio Mairena: Cantes en Londres ye en La Union Pasarela PRD-107 (Live performance with Manuel Morao in London in 1954 and with Paco at La Union, February 16, 1974, released 1984)
- Camarón de la Isla
  - Officially, the simple descriptive title for five of the first six collaborative albums by these two performers, excluding Canastera, was El Camarón de la Isla con la colaboración especial de Paco de Lucía, but each of the five came to be identified by the title of their first track.
  - Al Verte las Flores Lloran (1969)
  - Cada Vez que Nos Miramos (1970)
  - Son Tus Ojos Dos Estrellas (1971)
  - Canastera (1972)
  - Una Noche en Torres Bermejas (1972, but recorded in 1969), Philips 63 28 033), live with Camarón and Pepa de Utrera.
  - Caminito de Totana (1973)
  - Soy Caminante (1974)
  - Arte y Majestad (1975)
  - Rosa María (1976)
  - Castillo de Arena (1977)
  - Camarón en la Venta de Vargas (2006)
- Camarón de la Isla (also with Tomatito)
  - Como el Agua (1981)
  - Calle Real (1983)
  - Viviré (1984)
  - Potro de Rabia y Miel (1992)

== Other contributions ==
- Poets in New York (Poetas en Nueva York) (contributor, Federico García Lorca tribute album, 1986)
- accompanied two songs on Jazz Flamenco: Pedro Iturralde (Hispavox HH S 11'28)
- Composed or contributed to the soundtracks for
  - La Sabina
  - The Hit by Stephen Frears
  - Flamenco, Flamenco (2011), Carmen and Sevillanas by Carlos Saura
  - Montoyas y Tarantos
  - Soñadores de España(1992), Plácido Domingo & Manuel Alejandro
  - Vicky Cristina Barcelona
- One song contributed to Life Aquatic With Steve Zissou Soundtrack (La Nina de Puerta Oscura) (2004)
- Elegant Gypsy by Al Di Meola (1977) - de Lucía plays a duet with Di Meola on the track "Mediterranean Sundance".
- Shpongle sampled his track "Introduccion y Pantomima" in their song "Around the World in a Tea Daze" from the album Tales of the Inexpressible.

== Further information ==
A tentatively complete discography of Lucía, including cover-photos and listing all his appearances, both in his own right and with other artists whomsoever, has been compiled by the flamenco guitarist Mark Shurey "Pimientito", and was presented by him on the flamenco forum www.foroflamenco.com.
