= Integral (album) =

Box set by Paco de Lucía
- Released: August 18, 2003
- Genre: Flamenco
- Length: 1018:09
- Label: Universal Music Spain

Integral is a limited edition, 26-CD box set of the works of renowned flamenco guitarist Paco de Lucía. All works have been remastered from the original source tapes.

In addition, it includes a 60-page biography, a 115-page guide to each and every track, several albums that had been discontinued and out of print as well as a special bonus compilation disc exclusive to this box set called Por Descubrir which contains rare material including de Lucía's first solo EP that he recorded when he was only 16 years old.

Integral features the following albums:

1. Dos guitarras flamencas – 46:40
2. 12 canciones de García Lorca para guitarra – 37:17
3. 12 éxitos para 2 guitarras flamencas – 34:05
4. La fabulosa guitarra de Paco de Lucía – 34:34
5. Canciones andaluzas para 2 guitarras – 32:55
6. Dos guitarras flamencas en América Latina – 29:53
7. Fantasía flamenca de Paco de Lucía – 37:22
8. En Hispanoamérica – 31:38
9. 12 Hits para 2 guitarras flamencas y orquesta de cuerda – 33:35
10. El mundo del flamenco – 36:35
11. Recital de guitarra – 38:46
12. El duende flamenco de Paco de Lucía – 40:01
13. Fuente y caudal – 38:07
14. En vivo desde el Teatro Real – 45:27
15. Almoraima – 37:25
16. Interpreta a Manuel de Falla – 29:46
17. Sólo quiero caminar – 36:55
18. Castro Marín – 35:52
19. Live... One Summer Night – 41:14
20. Siroco – 35:52
21. Zyryab – 42:02
22. Concierto de Aranjuez – 39:08
23. Live in América – 60:19
24. The Guitar Trio – 53:01
25. Luzia – 45:56
26. Por Descubrir – 44:44
