= Ramón de Algeciras =

Spanish flamenco guitarist, composer (1938–2009)

- Born: 5 February 1938; Algeciras, Spain
- Died: 2009 (aged 70–71) Madrid, Spain
- Genres: flamenco
- Instruments: guitar

Ramón Sánchez Gómez, better known by his stage name Ramón de Algeciras, (5 February 1938 – 20 January 2009) was a Spanish flamenco guitarist, composer and lyricist. He was the most prolific collaborator of Paco de Lucía, his younger brother, recording with him on most of his albums from the 1960s to 1980s and performing with him throughout much of his life as a rhythm guitarist, including the Paco de Lucía Sextet, formed in 1981, which also included his other brother Pepe de Lucía.

== Biography ==
Born in Algeciras in 1938, he was a brother of Paco de Lucía, flamenco guitarist and composer, and Pepe de Lucía, flamenco singer and songwriter. He was one of five children of flamenco guitarist Antonio Sánchez Pecino and Portuguese mother Lúcia Gomes. His father Antonio received guitar lessons from a cousin of Melchor de Marchena, Manuel Fernandez "Titi de Marchena", a guitarist who arrived in Algeciras in the 1920s and established a school there. Like Paco, Antonio introduced Ramón to the guitar at a very young age and by his teens he was quite an accomplished player. He idolized Niño Ricardo, and taught his complex falsetas to his young brother Paco, who would learn them with relative ease and change them to his own liking and embellish them. This angered Ramón initially who considered Ricardo's works to be sacred and thought his brother was showing off, but he soon came to respect his brother immensely and came to realize that he was a prodigious talent and a "fuera de serie", a special person. De Algeciras began his career in 1953 under the tutelage of his father, Antonio Sánchez Pecino, spending more than a decade with the company of Juanito Valderrama.

In the early 1960s, he toured with Paco in the flamenco troupe of dancer José Greco. In New York City in 1963, they had an encounter with Sabicas and their first encounter with Mario Escudero, both of whom became mentors to him and Paco and later close friends. He toured again with José Greco in 1966. The brothers appeared at the 1967 Berlin Jazz Festival. In the late 1960s, they toured Europe with a group called Festival Flamenco Gitano and encountered other new talents in the flamenco world including singer Camarón de la Isla, with whom they enjoyed a fruitful collaboration between 1968 and 1977. He recorded many albums with his brother, including Canciones andaluzas para 2 guitarras (1967), Dos guitarras flamencas en América Latina (1967), Fantasía flamenca de Paco de Lucía (1969), and 12 Hits para 2 guitarras flamencas y orquesta de cuerda (1969), El duende flamenco de Paco de Lucía (1972), Fuente y caudal (1973) and the classical Interpreta a Manuel de Falla (1978). They met Esteban Sanlúcar in Buenos Aires and Juan Serrano in Detroit and in 1970 spent considerable time in New York City where they grew close to Sabicas and Mario Escudero and would play together into the night.

De Algeciras also worked with Antonio Mairena, Pepe Marchena, and La Niña de los Peines. He and his brother Paco were the first two flamenco guitarists that played at the Teatro Real in Madrid in 1975. Before his death in Madrid in 2009, he had composed over 140 works.

== Selected discography ==
=== With de Lucía ===
- Canciones andaluzas para 2 guitarras (1967)
- Dos guitarras flamencas en América Latina (1967)
- Paco de Lucía y Ramón de Algeciras en Hispanoamérica (1969)
- 12 Hits para 2 guitarras flamencas y orquesta de cuerda (1969)
- El mundo del flamenco (1971)
- Recital de guitarra de Paco de Lucía (1971)
- El duende flamenco de Paco de Lucía (1972)
- Fuente y caudal (1973)
- Almoraima (1976)
- Interpreta a Manuel de Falla (1978)
- Sólo quiero caminar (1981) The Paco de Lucía Sextet
- Live... One Summer Night (1984)

=== With de Lucía and Camarón de la Isla ===
- Al Verte las Flores Lloran (1969)
- Cada Vez que Nos Miramos (1970)
- Son Tus Ojos Dos Estrellas (1971)
- Canastera (1972)
- Caminito de Totana (1973)
- Soy Caminante (1974)
- Arte y Majestad (1975)
- Rosa María (1976)
- Castillo de Arena (1977)

== Bibliography ==
- Custodio, Diana Pérez (November 2005), Paco de Lucía: La evolución del flamenco a través de sus rumbas, Servicio Publicaciones UCA, ISBN 978-84-96274-75-4
- Pohren, D. E. (1992), Paco de Lucía and Family: The Master Plan, Society of Spanish Studies, ISBN 978-0-933224-62-9
- Woodall, James (2007), "Lucía, Paco de", Grove Music Online, Oxford University Press
