= Golpe =

Golpe has multiple meanings, as described below:

- In music, golpe can mean
  - golpe (guitar technique), a Flamenco guitar technique where one uses the fingers to tap on the soundboard of the guitar, from the Spanish golpe, meaning to strike;
  - guitarra de golpe, a five string guitar used in mariachi music.
- In politics, golpe can mean a coup d'état, from the Spanish term golpe de estado.
- In heraldry, golpe is a purple (purpure) roundel.
