= Recital de guitarra =

Recital de guitarra de Paco de Lucía

Studio album by Paco de Lucía
- Released: 1971
- Genre: Flamenco
- Length: 38:46
- Label: Universal Music Spain

Paco de Lucía chronology
El mundo del flamenco (1971)	Recital de guitarra de Paco de Lucía (1971)	El duende flamenco de Paco de Lucía (1972)

Recital de guitarra de Paco de Lucía (Paco de Lucía's Guitar Concert) is the 4th solo and 11th overall album by Paco de Lucía.

== Track listing ==
1. "El Vito" – 3:25
2. "Mi Inspiración" – 3:17
3. "Malagueña de Lecuona” – 4:32
4. "Serranía de Ronda" – 4:11
5. "Rumba Improvisada" – 4:05
6. "Temas del Pueblo" – 4:39
7. "Plazuela" – 3:52
8. "Zarda de Monty" – 2:59
9. "Andalucía de Lecuona" – 4:18
10. "Fuente Nueva" – 3:28

== Musicians ==
Paco de Lucía – Flamenco guitar
Ramón de Algeciras – Flamenco guitar
Enrique Jimenez
Paco Cepero
Isidro Sanlucar
Julio Vallejo
