= Mediterranean Sundance =

Song by Al Di Meola

from the album Elegant Gypsy
- Released: 1977
- Genre: Jazz fusion; New Flamenco
- Length: 5:13
- Label: Columbia
- Composer: Al Di Meola

"Mediterranean Sundance" is the third track on Elegant Gypsy (1977), the second album by Al Di Meola. This piece and "Lady Of Rome, Sister Of Brazil", are the only two entirely acoustic tracks on the album. However, unlike "Lady Of Rome, Sister Of Brazil" which is an acoustic solo by Di Meola, "Mediterranean Sundance" consists of an acoustic guitar duet with flamenco guitarist Paco de Lucía. With a duration of 5' 13", the song is a complex blend of jazz and flamenco influences.

== Composition ==
Set in 4/4 time and in the key of E minor, the song begins with a duet between Di Meola and de Lucía and then progresses to feature each guitar player taking turns playing rhythm and soloing, and occasionally soloing together.

The song consists of a relatively simple lyrical harmonic progression, adorned by a flamenco rhythm. It poses extreme difficulties to the performers, however, because of the speed and precision required of Di Meola's picking on the steel-stringed guitar, playing extremely long melodic phrases, and to Paco de Lucia's complex fingerpicking on the flamenco guitar, as well as the exact matching of Di Meola and de Lucía's solos which frequently consist of their both playing a rapid set of matching or corresponding notes. They make use of many guitar performance techniques and fingerstyles, such as drumming guitar tops, strumming (both solo and together), bare thumb plucking, palm muting, tremolo picking, hammer-ons and pull-offs, sweep picking, shredding, vibratos and glissandos. The song was a success.

== Live performances ==
Perhaps the most famous version of "Mediterranean Sundance" is the one included in the 1981 live album Friday Night in San Francisco, a jam session performed in San Francisco on the night of 5 December 1980 by The Guitar Trio, then consisting of Di Meola (who had replaced Larry Coryell earlier in the year), de Lucía and John McLaughlin. Like the studio version, this one too is a Di Meola-de Lucía duet, but also includes a rendition of de Lucía's flamenco piece "Río Ancho".

A three-guitars live version – featuring Di Meola, de Lucía and for the first time McLaughlin – was performed by the Trio (reunited after thirteen years) on November 1996 and released in the live album Pavarotti & Friends for War Child.

== Additional releases ==
In 1999, the Hungarian guitarists "Agócsi-Tüske Duo" recorded the song which was included as the first track of their "Nostalgia Tour '99 LIVE" album.
