= Paco de Lucía interpreta a Manuel de Falla =

Studio album by Paco de Lucía
- Released: 1978
- Genre: Flamenco
- Length: 29:46
- Label: Polygram Iberica

Paco de Lucía chronology
Almoraima	Paco de Lucía interpreta a Manuel de Falla	Castro Marín

Paco de Lucía interpreta a Manuel de Falla is the twelfth studio album by the Spanish composer and guitarist Paco de Lucía. All the pieces were written by Manuel de Falla.

De Falla was a composer who wrote very little music for the guitar. Although there is no doubt that de Falla was influenced by cante jondo, his music has to be arranged for guitar. In this respect, he can be compared to another Spanish composer, Isaac Albéniz whose piano music has entered the guitar repertory.

The three dances from The Three-Cornered Hat (1911) were originally written for orchestra. They take the form of seguidillas ("Danza de los Vecinos") and farrucas (the dances of the miller and his wife).

El Amor Brujo was written to feature a flamenco dancer plus actors and musicians. It was originally scored for a small band and a singer, a vocal part intended for a cantaora.

== Track listing ==
1. "Danza de los Vecinos" from The Three-Cornered Hat (El Sombrero de Tres Picos) – 3:09
2. "Danza ritual del fuego" (from El Amor Brujo) – 4:24
3. "Introducción y pantomima" (from El Amor Brujo) – 2:59
4. "El Paño Moruno" (from Siete Canciones Populares) – 1:27
5. "Danza del Molinero" (from El Sombrero de Tres Picos) – 3:04
6. "Danza" (from La Vida Breve) – 3:24
7. "Escena" (from El Amor Brujo) – 1:25
8. "Canción del fuego fatuo" (from El Amor Brujo) – 4:05
9. "Danza del terror" (from El Amor Brujo) – 1:48
10. "Danza de la Molinera" (from El Sombrero de Tres Picos) – 4:01

== Musicians ==
- Paco de Lucía - Flamenco guitar
- Ramón de Algeciras - Flamenco Guitar
- Pepe de Lucía - Vocal
- Alvaro Yebenes - Bass guitar
- Rubem Dantas - Percussion
- Jorge Pardo - Flute
- Pedro Ruy-Blas - Drums
