= Siroco (album) =

Studio album by Paco de Lucía
- Released: 1987
- Genre: Flamenco
- Length: 35:52
- Label: Polydor

Paco de Lucía chronology
Entre Dos Aguas (1986)	Siroco (1987)	Zyryab (1990)

Professional ratings
Review scores
Source	Rating
Allmusic	link

Siroco is a 1987 album by flamenco guitarist Paco de Lucía. There is a "clean" version of Mi Niño Curro (rondeña) offered by iTunes and Amazon.

== Track listing ==
1. La Cañada (tangos) – 5:15
2. Mi Niño Curro (rondeña) – 3:28
3. La Barrosa (alegrías) – 4:36
4. Caña de Azúcar (rumba) – 4:19
5. El Pañuelo (bulerías) – 5:27
6. Callejón del Muro (minera) – 3:55
7. Casilda (tanguillos) – 3:45
8. Gloria al Niño Ricardo (soleá) – 5:07

== Personnel ==
- Paco de Lucía - Guitar
- Rubem Dantas - Cajón, Guitar (tracks 1, 7)
- Jose Maria Bandera - Guitar (track 4)
- Pepe de Lucía - Talegon claps (track 4)
- Ramón de Algeciras - Guitar (track 7)
- Juan Ramírez- Dancer (track 3)
