= Panaderos Flamencos =

Panaderos Flamencos, also known as Panaderos, is a flamenco piece by Esteban de Sanlúcar. A crisp bright sound, it is played in the key of C major, usually with a capo on the third fret. It has been performed by Paco de Lucía.
