= La Barrosa =

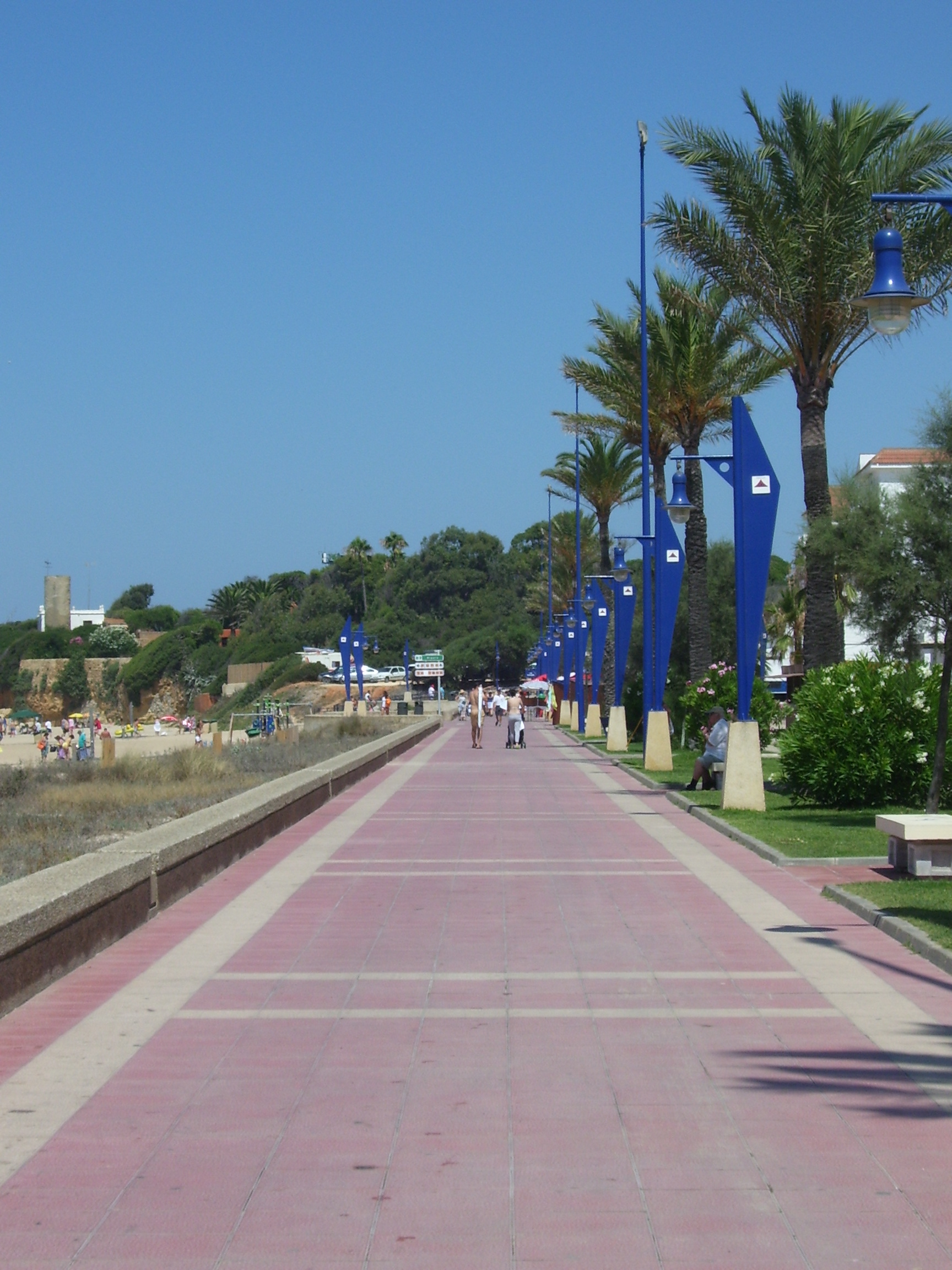
Playa de la Barrosa

La Barrosa (meaning 'mud coloured') is a flamenco piece by Spanish virtuoso guitarist Paco de Lucía. An alegrías, it featured on his 1987 album Siroco and is one of his best known and acclaimed works. The piece is named after Playa la Barrosa, a 6 km long beach in Chiclana de la Frontera, Cádiz. He has performed it all across the world including a performance in front of the Plaza Mayor in Madrid in 1996 and televised nationally on TVE1. It is played in the key of B major with a capo on the second fret. Eric Clapton and Richard Chapman described the piece as "full of effortless delicacy with cascading phrases".
