= Cepa Andaluza =

Song performed by Paco de Lucía

"Cepa Andaluza" is a 1972 composition by virtuoso Spanish flamenco guitarist Paco de Lucia. It featured on his 1973 album, Fuente y caudal. A Bulería, it is generally played in C phrygian, with a capo on the third fret, based on the C 7 flat 9 chord. It has been played by Grisha Goryachev.

== Reception ==
Jazz Forum cite "Cepa Andaluza" and "Entre dos Aguas" as among his most popular compositions, both appearing on his 1973 album Fuente y caudal. Mel Bay Publications describe it as a "magnificent bulerías", and said to "compare the palmas patterns on it to those on any bulerías from the CD "Cositas Buenas" (2004)." Richard Chapman and Eric Clapton describe Cepa Andaluza as "exciting", and note that the track was originally an afterthought, and was "set to change Paco's career." Guitar International noted that the recording of Cepa Andaluza has "the aire of a juerga", with Paco "swinging to the jaleo and palmas on a track."
