= Concierto de Aranjuez (disambiguation) =

Concierto de Aranjuez is a composition for classical guitar and orchestra by Joaquín Rodrigo.

Concierto de Aranjuez may also refer to:

- Concierto de Aranjuez, an album by the German band Cusco
- Concierto de Aranjuez (Paco de Lucía album), 1991
- Concerto d'Aranjuez / Sounds of Spain, a 1967 album released by the Paris-based Swingle Singers (released as Spanish Masters in the U.S.)
- Concierto de Aranjuez, a 1984 album by Dorothy Ashby

== See also ==
- Miles Davis's interpretation of the Adagio from Concierto de Aranjuez is included in his 1960 album Sketches of Spain.
