= Río Ancho (disambiguation) =

Río Ancho may refer to:

- Río Ancho (song), a classic flamenco track by Paco de Lucia
- Río Ancho, Cuba, village in Sancti Spíritus, Cuba
- Río Ancho, Colombia, a corregemiento in Dibulla, La Guajira, Colombia
- Río Ancho (river), a creek in the Sierra Nevada de Santa Marta range
