= Fuente y caudal =

Album by Paco de Lucía

Studio album by Paco de Lucía
- Released: 1973
- Genre: Flamenco
- Length: 35:43
- Label: Polygram Iberica

Paco de Lucía chronology
| El duende flamenco de Paco de Lucía (1972) | Fuente y caudal (1973) | En vivo desde el Teatro Real (1975) |

Fuente y caudal (translated in English as Source and Flow) is the ninth studio album by the Spanish composer and guitarist Paco de Lucía.

== Track listing ==
All pieces are credited to Paco de Lucía and José Torregrosa.

1. "Entre dos aguas" (Rumba) – 5:59
2. "Aires choqueros" (Fandangos de Huelva) – 4:14
3. "Reflejo de luna" (Granaína) – 3:53
4. "Solera" (Bulerías por Soleá) – 3:41
5. "Fuente y caudal" (Taranta) – 5:13
6. "Cepa Andaluza" (Bulería) – 5:46
7. "Los Pinares" (Tangos) – 3:33
8. "Plaza de San Juan" (Alegrías) – 3:12

== Personnel ==
- Paco de Lucía - Flamenco guitar
- Ramón de Algeciras - Flamenco guitar
