= Ricardo Modrego =

Spanish flamenco guitarist (1934–2017)

- Born: October 19, 1934; Madrid, Spain
- Died: January 17, 2017 (aged 82); Pozuelo de Alarcón, Community of Madrid, Spain
- Occupation: Guitarist
- Spouse: Teo Santelmo
- Children: 2

Ricardo Modrego (19 October 1934 – 17 January 2017) was a Spanish flamenco guitarist from Madrid. He was the brother of Spanish-Flamenco dancer Nana Lorca. They both started their careers in Madrid in the early 1950s.

By 1953, the well-known brother and sister duo were under contract to tour South America with Spanish dancer Hurtado de Cordoba. In October 1954 the Cordoba Company debut at the 48th Street Theatre in New York to good reviews and poor ticket sales. The four-week contract played out for only two weeks. The brother and sister team found temporary work in the US but soon returned to Spain. In Madrid they auditioned for Pilar Lopez and joined her company touring in Spain and internationally. Ricardo recorded three albums with a young Paco de Lucia, his first albums, Dos guitarras flamencas (1964), 12 canciones de García Lorca para guitarra, and 12 éxitos para 2 guitarras flamencas (1965). In between the records the brother and sister team toured with the Jose Greco Spanish Dance Company. Nana later married Jose Greco and both of them toured the world as famous Spanish-Flamenco dancers. Ricardo also toured with Mariemma and Antonio Ruiz and joined the Greco's on tour from time to time. Jose and Nana had one son Paolo Greco, a film music composer. The Greco's divorced leaving both Nana Lorca and Paolo Greco to live in Madrid.

Ricardo Modrego, married dancer Teo Santelmo in 1969, they had two sons. In his later years Ricardo was teaching guitar in Madrid. He died in Madrid on January 17, 2017, of lung cancer, he was 82 years old.
