= Río Ancho =

Spanish flamenco guitar piece

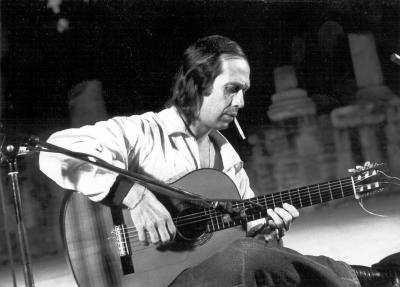
Paco de Lucia

"Río Ancho" is a Spanish flamenco guitar piece that combines flamenco and gypsy jazz influences. The piece is in the key of E minor and progresses to A minor, D, G, C and B7. The original performances of the song had notable flute solos towards the end of the piece, reminiscent of classic Spanish gypsy music with trumpets. The track first featured on Paco de Lucia's 1976 album Almoraima.

In 1980, Paco de Lucia and Al Di Meola collaborated and produced an ensemble track composed of Di Meola's "Mediterranean Sundance" from his 1977 album Elegant Gypsy with "Río Ancho". It was performed live in San Francisco on December 5, 1980, and the set was released by Columbia as Friday Night in San Francisco.

The collaborative version of the song consists of a relatively simple lyrical harmonic progression adorned by a flamenco rhythm. However, it poses technical difficulties due to the speed and precision required of Di Meola's picking on the steel-stringed guitar, playing melodic phrases, and to Paco de Lucia's fingerpicking on the flamenco guitar, as well as the exact matching of Di Meola and de Lucía's solos which frequently consist of them both playing a rapid set of matching or corresponding notes. They resort to many guitar performance techniques and fingerstyles, such as drumming guitar tops, strumming, bare thumb plucking, palm muting, tremolo picking, hammer-ons and pull-offs, sweep picking, vibratos, and glissandos. The collaboration was an instant success.

A shorter version was included in the November 1996 album Pavarotti & Friends for War Child.

The 1980 version proved more successful, and the Mediterranean Sundance and Río Ancho track has been performed by Marco Porcu, Seis Cuerdas, Jorge Martinez and La Peña Flamenca.
