= Por Descubrir =

Compilation album by Paco de Lucía
- Released: August 18, 2003
- Genre: Flamenco
- Length: 44:44
- Label: Universal Music Spain

Por Descubrir is a compilation album by flamenco guitarist Paco de Lucía that was released exclusively as part of the limited edition Integral box set.

The first four tracks are from de Lucía's first solo recording, an EP called La guitarra de Paco de Lucía that was released in 1964 when de Lucía was only 16 years old. In addition, there are other rare, unreleased recordings from various points in his career.

== Track listing ==
1. "Rondeñas (1964)" – 4:15
2. "Aires andaluces (1964)" – 2:10
3. "Piropo Gaditano (1964)" – 4:10
4. "Cielo Sevillano (1964)" – 2:10
5. "Esencia gitana (1972)" – 3:36
6. "¿Por dónde caminas? (1978)" – 5:14
7. "Tema de amor (1979)" – 2:34
8. "Tema de Celos (1979)" – 1:22
9. "Tema andaluz (1979)" – 1:48
10. "Sevillanas (1992)" – 3:10
11. "Gabarre (1999)" – 4:52
12. "Plaza Real (2000)" – 4:21
13. "Niquelao (2000)" – 5:02

== Musicians ==
Paco de Lucía – Flamenco guitar
