= Concierto de Aranjuez (Paco de Lucía album) =

Studio album by Paco de Lucía
- Released: 1991
- Genres: Flamenco, classical
- Length: 39:08
- Label: Polygram Iberica
- Producer: Richard Hardly

Paco de Lucía chronology
Zyryab (1990)	Concierto de Aranjuez (1991)	Luzia (1998)

Concierto de Aranjuez is a 1991 album by Paco de Lucía. The first 3 tracks are his interpretation of Joaquín Rodrigo's Concierto de Aranjuez while tracks 4–6 are his interpretation of Isaac Albéniz's Iberia.

== Track listing ==
1. "Allegro con spirito" – 5:49
2. "Adagio" – 11:35
3. "Allegro gentile" – 5:29
4. "Triana" – 5:02
5. "El Albaicín" – 7:30
6. "El Puerto" – 3:44

== Musicians ==
- Paco de Lucía - Flamenco guitar
- José María Bandera - Flamenco guitar (Albéniz only)
- Juan Manuel Cañizares - Flamenco guitar (Albéniz only)
- Orquesta de Cadaqués (Rodrigo only)
- Edmon Colomer - Conductor (Rodrigo only)
