= Castillo de Arena =

1977 album by Camarón de la Isla and Paco de Lucía

Studio album by Paco de Lucía and Camarón de la Isla
- Released: 1977
- Genre: Flamenco

Paco de Lucía and Camarón de la Isla chronology
Son Tus Ojos Dos Estrellas (1971)	Castillo de Arena (1977)	Calle Real (1983)

Castillo de Arena is a 1977 album, the last in a series of nine albums featuring flamenco guitarist Paco de Lucía and singer Camarón de la Isla. Paco de Lucia's brother Ramón de Algeciras also contributes guitar to the proceedings. The lyrics were written by Antonio Sánchez, with the exception of the bulerías "Samara" which was penned by both Sánchez and de la Isla. After this album, de Lucía turned his attentions to instrumental collaborations with jazz guitarists Larry Coryell, Al Di Meola and John McLaughlin, only returning to record again with Camarón on 1981's Como el Agua.

== Track listing ==
No.	Title	Length
1.	"Samara"	3:24
2.	"Donde Se Divisa El Mar"	3:20
3.	"Y Mira Que Mira Y Mira"	3:17
4.	"De Tus Ojos Soy Cautivo"	3:11
5.	"Dos Estrellas Relucientes/De La Alegre Primavera"	2:17
6.	"Como Castillo De Arena"	3:54
7.	"Vivo Pa Quererte"	3:48
8.	"De Lo Que Yo Soy Pa Ti/Por Culpa De Tu Cariño"	2:44
9.	"Que He Dejao De Quererte"	1:58
10.	"Por Cositas Malas"	2:51
