= En Hispanoamérica =

Paco de Lucía y Ramón de Algeciras en Hispanoamérica

Studio album by Paco de Lucía & Ramón de Algeciras
- Released: 1969
- Genre: Flamenco
- Length: 31:38
- Label: Polygram Iberica

Paco de Lucía & Ramón de Algeciras chronology
Dos guitarras flamencas en América Latina (1967)	Paco de Lucía y Ramón de Algeciras en Hispanoamérica (1969)	12 Hits para 2 guitarras flamencas y orquesta de cuerda (1969)

Paco de Lucía y Ramón de Algeciras en Hispanoamérica (Paco de Lucía and Ramón de Algeciras in Latin America) is the third of four collaboration albums by Paco de Lucía and his brother Ramón de Algeciras.

== Track listing ==
1. "Amapola" – 2:55
2. "Pájaro chogüí" – 2:36
3. "Yo vendo unos ojos negros” – 2:01
4. "Guadalajara" – 2:35
5. "Limeña" – 2:30
6. "Las mañanitas" – 2:40
7. "Alma, corazón y vida" – 3:05
8. "Quizás, Quizás, Quizás" – 3:14
9. "Tico, tico" – 2:17
10. "Lamento Borincano" – 2:28
11. "Y todo a media luz" – 3:00
12. "La paloma" – 2:17

== Musicians ==
Paco de Lucía – Flamenco guitar
Ramón de Algeciras – Flamenco guitar
