= Canastera =

1972 album by Camarón de la Isla and Paco de Lucía

Canastera is a 1972 flamenco album by Camarón de la Isla and Paco de Lucía.

== Tracks ==
1	Canastera (Canastera)	3:49
2	No Dudes De La Nobleza (Fandangos De Antonio De La Calzá)	3:41
3	Que A Mí Me Vio De Nacer (Alegrías)	2:17
4	Calabosito Oscuro (Seguiriyas De La Isla Y De Manuel Molina)	3:26
5	No Quisiera Que Te Fueras (Bulerías)	3:24
6	Las Campanas También Lloran (Tientos)	3:23
7	Una Gitana Morena (Bulerías)	3:28
8	La Vi Por Primera Vez (Fandangos Del Rubio)	3:12
9	Estás Ciego Pa No Ver (Bulerías Por Soleá)	3:35
10	Soñaba Siempre Contigo (Cartagenera De Chacón)	1:41
11	Y Me Gustan Las Mujeres (Tangos)	3:47
12	Dios Te Dará A Ti La Gloria (Verdiales)	1:54
