= Antonio Sánchez Pecino =

Antonio Sánchez Pecino (5 February 1908 – 23 June 1994) was the father of famed flamenco guitarists Paco de Lucía, Ramón de Algeciras, and flamenco singer/songwriter Pepe de Lucía. He was also a well-known flamenco guitarist and songwriter in his own right, producing and writing most of the songs that appeared on the early albums by Camarón de la Isla and Paco de Lucía.

Antonio Sánchez Pecino was born on 5 February 1908. He died in Madrid on 23 June 1994 at 86 years of age.
