= Gloria al Niño Ricardo =

"Gloria al Niño Ricardo" is a flamenco guitar composition composed by Paco de Lucía which features on his 1987 album Siroco. The piece is dedicated to Niño Ricardo who was de Lucia's "first hero" of the guitar. The piece is a soleá and is known for its technically demanding passages. It is played in the key of C major, but a significant part of the composition features the phrygian E and a E 7 flat 9 chord and it features elaborate tremolo picking at the beginning. However, when performing it live, Lucia often played it in the key of D flat major with a capo on the first fret.
