= Son Tus Ojos Dos Estrellas =

Studio album by Camarón de la Isla and Paco de Lucía
- Released: 1971
- Genre: Flamenco
- Label: Philips

Camarón de la Isla and Paco de Lucía chronology
Cada Vez que Nos Miramos (1970)	Son Tus Ojos Dos Estrellas (1971)	Castillo de Arena (1977)

Son Tus Ojos Dos Estrellas is a 1971 flamenco album by Camarón de la Isla and Paco de Lucía. It features Paco de Lucía on guitar and Antonio Sánchez, Paco's father, as composer together with his son.

== Track listing ==
No.	Title	Style	Length
1.	"Son Tus Ojos Dos Estrellas"	Bulerías	3:30
2.	"La Mujer Con Ser Mujer"	Malagueñas	2:00
3.	"Por Mala Lengua Que Tienes"	Soleá de Alcalá	4:11
4.	"Sin Motivos Ni Razón"	Fandangos	2:43
5.	"En La Provincia de Cádiz"	Petenera	3:01
6.	"De Una Mina de La Unión"	Minera	2:32
7.	"El Espejo En Que Te Miras"	Soleá	3:05
8.	"Me La Tienes Controlá"	Fandangos	2:37
9.	"Al Padre Santo de Roma"	Tangos	3:18
10.	"Estoy Cumpliendo Condena"	Polo	4:26
11.	"Se Murió Mi Madre"	Seguiriyas	3:10
12.	"Me Voy Por La Calle Abajo"	Bulerías	2:31
