= Ímpetu =

"Ímpetu" is a flamenco guitar composition, a bulerias. It was composed by Mario Escudero. It was recorded by Paco de Lucía on his 1967 album La fabulosa guitarra de Paco de Lucía.
