= La fabulosa guitarra de Paco de Lucía =

Studio album by Paco de Lucía
- Released: 1967
- Genre: Flamenco
- Length: 34:34
- Label: Polygram Iberica

La fabulosa guitarra de Paco de Lucía (The Fabulous Guitar of Paco de Lucía) is the first solo studio album by Paco de Lucía.

== Track listing ==
1. "Gitanos Trianeros" – 3:42
2. "Llanto a Cádiz" – 3:27
3. "Recuerdo a Patiño” – 3:08
4. "Punta Umbría" – 3:24
5. "Jerezana" – 3:02
6. "Viva La Unión" – 4:42
7. "Llora la siguiriya" – 3:16
8. "En la caleta" – 3:23
9. "Impetu" by Mario Escudero – 2:57
10. "El Tajo" – 3:33

== Musicians ==
Paco de Lucía – Flamenco guitar
