= 12 canciones de García Lorca para guitarra =

12 Canciones de García Lorca Para Guitarra

Studio album by Paco de Lucía and Ricardo Modrego
- Released: 1965
- Genre: Flamenco
- Length: 37:17
- Label: Polygram Iberica

Paco de Lucía and Ricardo Modrego chronology
Dos guitarras flamencas en stereo (1964)	12 Canciones de García Lorca Para Guitarra (1965)	12 éxitos para 2 guitarras flamencas (1965)

12 canciones de García Lorca para guitarra (12 Songs by García Lorca for Guitar) is an album by Paco de Lucía and Ricardo Modrego. It is the second of three collaboration albums between the duo.

== Track listing ==
No.	Title	Length
1.	"Zorongo Gitano"	2:56
2.	"Sevillanas del Siglo XVIII"	3:09
3.	"Las Morillas de Jaén"	2:53
4.	"Anda Jaleo"	4:00
5.	"Los Mozos de Monleón"	3:00
6.	"Los Reyes de la Baraja"	2:50
7.	"Los Cuatro Muleros"	2:48
8.	"Nana de Sevilla"	3:08
9.	"Café de Chinitas"	3:46
10.	"El Vito"	2:51
11.	"Los Peregrinitos"	3:30
12.	"Las Tres Hojas"	2:26

== Musicians ==
Paco de Lucía – Flamenco guitar
Ricardo Modrego – Flamenco guitar
