= El mundo del flamenco =

Studio album by Paco de Lucía
- Released: 1971
- Genre: Flamenco
- Length: 36:35
- Label: Polygram Iberica

El mundo del flamenco (The World of Flamenco) is an album by Paco de Lucía.

== Track listing ==
1. "Guajiras de Lucía" – 3:13
2. "Con el pensamiento" – 4:39
3. "Al Tempul" – 3:38
4. "Al Puerto" – 4:48
5. "María de los Dolores" – 3:25
6. "Taconeo gitano" – 3:00
7. "Callecita que subes" – 4:56
8. "Recuerdos" – 3:06
9. "El Impetu" (Mario Escudero) – 2:59
10. "El Rinconcillo" – 2:51

== Musicians ==
Paco de Lucía – Flamenco guitar
Ramón de Algeciras – Flamenco guitar
Pepe de Lucía – Vocals
Raúl – Zapateado
