= 12 Hits para 2 guitarras flamencas y orquesta de cuerda =

Studio album by Paco de Lucía and Ramón de Algeciras
- Released: 1969
- Genre: Flamenco
- Length: 33:35
- Label: Polygram Iberica

Paco de Lucía and Ramón de Algeciras chronology
Paco de Lucía y Ramón de Algeciras en Hispanoamérica (1969)	12 Hits para 2 guitarras flamencas y orquesta de cuerda (1969)

12 Hits para 2 guitarras flamencas y orquesta de cuerda (12 Hits for 2 Flamenco Guitars and a String Orchestra) is the fourth of four collaboration albums by Paco de Lucía and Ramón de Algeciras.

== Track listing ==
No.	Title	Length
1.	"Los Pescadores de Perlas"	2:49
2.	"Tango de la rosa"	3:08
3.	"Si no me more"	3:10
4.	"El amor de Laura"	2:18
5.	"La luna sobre las ruinas del castillo"	2:36
6.	"Celos"	2:30
7.	"La virgen de la Macarena"	3:59
8.	"Que será será"	2:27
9.	"Yo que no vivo sin tí"	2:23
10.	"Reserva el último baile para mí"	2:22
11.	"Bésame mucho"	3:13
12.	"Perfidia"	2:41

== Personnel ==
- Paco de Lucía – Flamenco guitar
- Ramón de Algeciras – Flamenco guitar
