= 12 éxitos para 2 guitarras flamencas =

Studio album by Paco de Lucía and Ricardo Modrego
- Released: 1965
- Genre: Flamenco
- Length: 34:05
- Label: Universal Music Spain

Paco de Lucía and Ricardo Modrego chronology
12 canciones de García Lorca para guitarra (1965)	12 éxitos para 2 guitarras flamencas (1965)

12 éxitos para 2 guitarras flamencas (12 Hits for 2 Flamenco Guitars) is the third of three collaboration albums between Paco de Lucía & Ricardo Modrego.

== Track listing ==
No.	Title	Length
1.	"Malagueña"	3:30
2.	"A tu vera"	3:05
3.	"María de la O."	2:20
4.	"Moliendo café"	2:28
5.	"Tangos de la Vieja Rica"	3:09
6.	"Sevillanas populares"	2:43
7.	"Ojos verdes"	2:47
8.	"La luna y el toro"	2:50
9.	"La niña de Puerta oscura"	3:05
10.	"La cárcel de oro"	2:00
11.	"No me digas que no"	3:00
12.	"El emigrante"	3:08

== Personnel ==
Paco de Lucía – Flamenco guitar
Ricardo Modrego – Flamenco guitar
