= Al Verte las Flores Lloran =

Studio album by Camarón de la Isla and Paco de Lucía
- Released: 1969
- Studio: Estudios Fonogram
- Genre: Flamenco
- Length: 41:13
- Label: Philips
- Producer: Antonio Sanchez Pecino

Camarón de la Isla and Paco de Lucía chronology
Al Verte las Flores Lloran (1969)	Cada Vez que Nos Miramos (1970)

Al Verte las Flores Lloran is a 1969 flamenco album by Camarón de la Isla and Paco de Lucía.

Officially, the simple descriptive title for five of the first six collaborative albums by these two performers, including this one, was El Camarón de la Isla con la colaboración especial de Paco de Lucía, but each of the five came to be identified by the title of their first track.

== Track listing ==
1. "Al verte las flores lloran" (Bulerías) 2:40
2. "Que un toro bravo en su muerte" (Tientos) 3:46
3. "Si acaso muero" (Seguiriyas) 4:08
4. "En una piedra me acosté" (Fandangos) – José Blas Vega – 3:26
5. "Anda y no presumas más" (Bulerías por soleá) 3:29
6. "Camina y dime" (Tarantos) 4:51
7. "Detrás del tuyo se va" (Tangos) – Francisco Almagro / Manuel Villacañas – 4:20
8. "Y tú no me respondías" (Soleares) 3:58
9. "Llorando me lo pedía" (Fandangos de Huelva) 2:56
10. "Una estrella chiquitita" (Bulerías) 4:17
11. "Con la varita en la mano" (Fandangos) – José Blas Vega – 3:31
12. "Barrio de Santa María" (Alegrías) 2:31

== Credits ==
- Vocals – Camarón De La Isla
- Guitar – Paco De Lucía
- Guitar [Second] – Ramón De Algeciras
