= Dos guitarras flamencas =

Dos guitarras flamencas en stereo

Studio album by Paco de Lucía & Ricardo Modrego
- Released: 1964
- Genre: Flamenco
- Length: 46:40
- Label: Polygram Iberica

Paco de Lucía & Ricardo Modrego chronology
Dos guitarras flamencas en stereo (1964)	12 canciones de García Lorca para guitarra (1965)

Dos guitarras flamencas en stereo (Two Flamenco Guitars in Stereo) is the first of three collaborative albums between Paco de Lucía & Ricardo Modrego.

The two had met while working for José Greco, a talent agent and flamenco dancer, and had composed most of the pieces while touring around the world with him. When they finally returned to Madrid, they proceeded to pitch their work to local record companies with no success. Modrego's father, however, happened to know Ricardo Fernández de Latorre at Philips Music and got them in the door.

They had been unable to secure studio time and all they had was a poor recording they had made in Modrego's home, but they pitched it anyway. Six hours after dropping off the tape they received a call to come in the next day, on February 11, 1964, and sign a two-year contract that would mark the beginning of De Lucía's illustrious career.

Recording was done over two days, six pieces per day, and on only two tracks. Due to the limitations in the recording studio at the time, there were also no cuts, meaning a mistake or a problem with the recording equipment meant having to start over completely from scratch.

In addition, as stereo equipment was still a relatively new phenomenon, they didn't have any when the record was released and were quite angry at how bad the album sounded on their mono record player. Modrego actually had to rent a stereo record player so they could hear it properly.

== Track listing ==
1. "Jerez en fiestas" – 3:53
2. "En la Alcazaba" – 4:58
3. "Gaditanas” – 3:43
4. "Tientos del amanecer" – 4:12
5. "Guajira flamenca" – 3:50
6. "Real de la feria" – 2:49
7. "Taconeo gitano" – 3:01
8. "Sortilegio" – 4:18
9. "Seguiriya tradicional" – 4:09
10. "Entre arrayanes" – 3:47
11. "Fuente de Carmona" – 4:18
12. "La caleta" – 3:42

== Musicians ==
- Paco de Lucía – Flamenco guitar
- Ricardo Modrego – Flamenco guitar
