= Canciones andaluzas para 2 guitarras =

Studio album by Paco de Lucía and Ramón de Algeciras
- Released: 1967
- Genre: Flamenco
- Length: 32:55
- Label: Universal Music Spain

Paco de Lucía and Ramón de Algeciras chronology
Canciones andaluzas para 2 guitarras (1967)	Dos guitarras flamencas en América Latina (1967)

Canciones andaluzas para 2 guitarras (Andalusian Songs for 2 Guitars) is the first of four collaboration albums by Paco de Lucía and Ramón de Algeciras.

== Track listing ==
1. Guajira "Que viene el coco" – 2:47
2. Bulería "La Zarzamora" – 2:18
3. Tientos "Canción del río” – 3:20
4. Fandangos de Huelva "Al Conquero" – 2:28
5. Jaleo "Los piconeros" – 2:35
6. Bulería "Roja de celos" – 3:00
7. Tanguillo "Pepa Banderas" – 2:27
8. Rumba "El Inclusero" – 3:06
9. Farruca "Limosna de amores" – 2:40
10. Bulería "Romance gitano" – 2:55
11. Bulería "Te lo juro yo" – 2:36
12. Sevillanas "Abril en Sevilla" – 2:43

== Musicians ==
Paco de Lucía – Flamenco guitar
Ramón de Algeciras – Flamenco guitar
Antonio Valdepeñas – Zapateado
Antoñita Imperio – Palillos
Pilar La Cubanita – Palmas
