= Dos guitarras flamencas en América Latina =

Studio album by Paco de Lucía & Ramón de Algeciras
- Released: 1967
- Genre: Flamenco
- Length: 29:53
- Label: Universal Music Spain

Paco de Lucía & Ramón de Algeciras chronology
Canciones andaluzas para 2 guitarras (1967)	Dos guitarras flamencas en América Latina (1967)	Paco de Lucía y Ramón de Algeciras en Hispanoamérica (1969)

Dos guitarras flamencas en América Latina (Two Flamenco Guitars in Latin America) is the second of four collaboration albums by Paco de Lucía and Ramón de Algeciras.

== Track listing ==
1. "Cielito lindo" – 2:39
2. "Alma llanera" – 2:57
3. "Mañana de carnaval” – 2:45
4. "El jarabe tapatío" – 2:23
5. "La flor de la canela" – 2:32
6. "A pesar de todo" – 2:24
7. "Siboney" – 2:44
8. "Granada" – 2:44
9. "Fina estampa" – 1:45
10. "Virgen de amor" – 2:23
11. "Malagueña salerosa" – 2:28
12. "Tomo y obligo" – 2:09

== Musicians ==
Paco de Lucía – Flamenco guitar
Ramón de Algeciras – Flamenco guitar
