= Donn Pohren =

American guitarist and musical historian

- Born: 1929
- Origin: Minneapolis, Minnesota, United States
- Died: 2007 (aged 77–78)
- Genre: Flamenco
- Occupations: Guitarist, historian
- Instrument: Guitar

Donn E. Pohren (1929–2007) was an American guitarist and historian. He is known for his three major texts on flamenco: The Art of Flamenco (1962), Lives and Legends of Flamenco: A Biographical History (1964), and A Way of Life (1980). He is the only non-Spaniard to receive the title of flamencologist by the Catedra de Flamencologia. Hailing from Minneapolis, he moved to Seville, married the dancer Luisa Maravilla, had a daughter, and completed a university degree in Madrid. He states that "in the beginning I used to say my mother was Spanish, and call myself Daniel Maravilla, which did help in getting accepted."
