= En vivo desde el Teatro Real =

Live album by Paco de Lucía
- Released: 1975
- Recorded: February 18, 1975
- Genre: Flamenco
- Length: 45:27
- Label: Polygram Iberica

En vivo desde el Teatro Real (translated to Live from the Royal Theater in English) is a live album by Paco de Lucía recorded on February 18, 1975 at the Teatro Real in Madrid, Spain. He was accompanied by his brother Ramón de Algeciras on stage.

== Track listing ==
1. "Alegrías" – 5:15
2. "Tarantas" – 6:04
3. "Granaínas" – 6:22
4. "Zapateado" – 4:19
5. "Soleá" – 5:20
6. "Fandangos" – 4:17
7. "Guajiras" – 4:56
8. "Rumba" – 8:54

== Musicians ==
- Paco de Lucía - Flamenco guitar
- Ramón de Algeciras - Flamenco guitar
