= Castro Marín =

Studio album by Paco de Lucía
- Released: 1981
- Genre: Flamenco, jazz
- Length: 35:52
- Label: Phonogram
- Producer: Kiyoshi Koyama

Paco de Lucía chronology
Interpreta a Manuel de Falla	Castro Marín	Friday Night in San Francisco

Professional ratings
Review scores
Source	Rating
Allmusic	3/5 stars

Castro Marín is the thirteenth studio album by the Spanish composer and guitarist Paco de Lucía. All songs were written by Paco de Lucía.

The title was a tribute to his mother, a Portuguese woman from Castro Marim, in the Algarve region of southern Portugal.

== Track listing ==
1. "Monasterio de Sal" (Colombiana) – 4:43
2. "Gitanos Andaluces" (Bulerías) – 4:55
3. "Castro Marín" (Fandangos) – 4:11
4. "Herencia" (Soleá) – 5:35
5. "Convite" (Rumba) [featuring Larry Coryell] – 5:08
6. "Palenque" [featuring Larry Coryell & John McLaughlin] – 7:22
7. "Huida" – 3:58

== Musicians ==
- Paco de Lucía - Flamenco guitar
- Larry Coryell - Acoustic guitar
- John McLaughlin - Acoustic guitar, 12 string guitar
- Carles Benavent - Bass guitar
