= Golpe (guitar technique) =

Golpe is mostly used in flamenco guitar. It is a finger tap on the golpeador ("pick guard").

== Technique ==
A guitarist usually performs golpe with the middle or annular (ring) finger, either simultaneously with a down-stroke by another finger (e.g., simultaneous down-stroke with index finger and golpe with annular finger), or independently to accent off beats. The technique requires that the strumming finger and golpe finger move in opposite directions at the same time.
