= Esteban de Sanlúcar =

Spanish flamenco guitarist and composer

Esteban Delgado Bernal (1910 in Sanlúcar de Barrameda – 1989 in Buenos Aires), stage name Esteban de Sanlúcar, was a Spanish flamenco guitarist and composer.

He began his musical career in private meetings and cabarets, later participating in theater companies with Pepe Marchena and Angelillo, among others. The last forty years of his life were spent in Latin America, Venezuela and Argentina, where he alternated his work as guitarist between teaching and composition. One of his early pupils in Spain was Manolo Yglesias. His works include Perfil Flamenco, El Castillo de Xauén, Aromas del Puerto, Primavera andaluza, Horizonte de Málaga, Mantilla de Feria and Panaderos Flamencos and Panaderos Flamencos II. Panaderos Flamencos and Perfil Flamenco in particular are perhaps his best-known compositions, and have become a part of the Flamenco guitar repertoire.
