= El duende flamenco de Paco de Lucía =

Album by Paco de Lucía

Studio album by Paco de Lucía
- Released: 1972
- Genre: Flamenco
- Length: 40:01
- Label: Polygram Iberica

Paco de Lucía chronology
Recital de guitarra de Paco de Lucía (1971)	El duende flamenco de Paco de Lucía (1972)	Fuente y caudal (1973)

El duende flamenco de Paco de Lucía (The Flamenco Soul of Paco de Lucía) is the eighth studio album by the Spanish composer and guitarist Paco de Lucía. All songs were written by Paco de Lucía.

== Track listing ==
1. "Percusión Flamenca" – 3:41
2. "Barrio la Viña" – 3:25
3. "Doblan Campanas" – 5:44
4. "Farruca de Lucía" – 4:35
5. "Tientos del Mentidero" – 3:27
6. "Farolillo de Feria" – 4:05
7. "De Madrugada" – 3:10
8. "Cuando Canta el Gallo" – 3:48
9. "Punta del Faro" – 3:57
10. "Canastera" – 4:09

== Personnel ==
- Paco de Lucía - Flamenco guitar
