= Almoraima =

Studio album by Paco de Lucía
- Released: 1976
- Genre: Flamenco, jazz
- Length: 37:38
- Label: Philips

Paco de Lucía chronology
Guitarras Flamengas Apasionadas (1975)	Almoraima (1976)	Interpreta A Manuel De Falla (1978)

Almoraima is a studio album by Paco de Lucía.

When Paco de Lucía made the groundbreaking Almoraima, he was just 28 years old. Already established as a prodigious talent, he used the opportunity to expand the possibilities of the flamenco music he loved so much. It wasn't so much the addition of bass and congas (he'd employed them before) as his entire rethinking of what constituted flamenco. The title cut, which opened the album, emphasized the Moorish influence, not only in the presence of the lute-like oud, but in its melody, which borrows from Arab maqams, or modes. "Rio Ancho" transports the rhumba rhythm to Brazil, melding it to a feel taken from bossa nova, which makes it all the more sinuous and sensual. More revolutionary is "Cobre," which virtually demolishes the flamenco form of sevillanas and rebuilds it in de Lucía's vision, giving it far more gravity. He never uses the record as a vehicle for his huge technical ability; instead, he focuses on serving the music, whether that's on the sad "Llanos de Real" or using a choir on "Perla de Cadiz" (which is dedicated to the singer of that name). This remains a landmark recording, not only in de Lucía's career, but in the annals of flamenco.

== Track listing ==
All tracks by Paco de Lucía.

1. "Almoraima" – 5:25
2. "Cueva del gato" – 5:43
3. "El cobre" – 3:10
4. "A la Perla de Cádiz" – 4:27
5. "Ole" – 4:19
6. "Plaza Alta" – 6:13
7. "Río Ancho" – 4:29
8. "Llanos del Real" – 3:39

== Musicians ==
- Paco de Lucía – guitar, oud
- Ramón de Algeciras – guitar
- Álvaro Yebenes – bass guitar
- Pedro Ruy-Blas – percussion
