= Luzia (album) =

Studio album by Paco de Lucía
- Released: 1998
- Genre: Flamenco-jazz
- Length: 45:56
- Label: Polygram Iberica

Luzia is a studio album by Paco de Lucía. It was made as a dedication to his Portuguese mother (hence the Portuguese spelling) when she died.

== Track listing ==
1. "Río de la miel" (Bulerías) – 5:08
2. "La Villa vieja" (Soleares) – 6:52
3. "Calle Munición" (Alegrías) – 5:37
4. "Me regalé" (Tangos) – 5:36
5. "Luzia" (Siguiriya) – 5:40
6. "Manteca colorá" (Rumba) – 4:58
7. "El chorruelo" (Bulerías) – 5:58
8. "Camarón" (Rondeñas) – 6:07

== Musicians ==
- Paco de Lucía – Flamenco guitar, vocals
- Tino Di Geraldo – Tabla, Percussion
- Carles Benavent – Bajo (Bass), Mandola
- Duquende – Vocals
- Josemi Carmona – Mandola
- Luis Dulzaides – Congas
