= Fantasía flamenca de Paco de Lucía =

Studio album by Paco de Lucía
- Released: 1969
- Genre: Flamenco
- Length: 37:22
- Label: Universal Music Spain

Fantasía flamenca de Paco de Lucía (Paco de Lucía's Flamenco Fantasy) is the second solo studio album by Paco de Lucía.

== Track listing ==
1. "Aires de Linares" – 6:04
2. "Mi inspiración" – 3:09
3. "Guajiras de Lucía” – 3:21
4. "Mantilla de feria" – 3:17
5. "El tempul" – 3:28
6. "Panaderos flamencos" (Esteban Sanlúcar) – 2:37
7. "Generalife bajo la luna" – 4:41
8. "Fiesta en Moguer" – 3:16
9. "Lamento minero" – 4:21
10. "Celosa" – 3:08

== Musicians ==
Paco de Lucía – Flamenco guitar
