= Camarón de la Isla =

Spanish Gypsy flamenco singer (1950–1992)

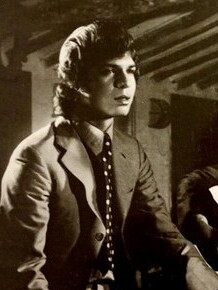
- Camarón de la Isla in 1969

Background information
- Born: José Monje Cruz; 5 December 1950; San Fernando, Province of Cádiz, Spain
- Died: 2 July 1992 (aged 41) Badalona, Barcelona, Spain
- Genres: Flamenco; nuevo flamenco
- Occupations: Singer; musician
- Instruments: Vocals; classical guitar
- Years active: 1969–1992
- Formerly of: Paco de Lucía; Tomatito
- Website: www.camarondelaisla.com

José Monje Cruz (5 December 1950 – 2 July 1992), better known by his stage name Camarón de la Isla, was a Spanish flamenco singer. Considered one of the all-time greatest flamenco singers, he was noted for his collaborations with Paco de Lucía and Tomatito, and the three of them were of major importance to the revival of flamenco in the second half of the 20th century.

== Early life ==
He was born in San Fernando, Province of Cádiz, into a Spanish Gypsy family, the seventh of eight children. His mother was Juana Cruz Castro, a "Canastera", literally a basket weaver, a term used to describe wandering gypsy families, and whose gift of singing was a strong early influence.

His father, Juan Luis Monje, was also a singer as well as a blacksmith, and had a forge where Camarón worked as a boy. His uncle José nicknamed him Camarón (Spanish for "Shrimp") because he was blonde and fair skinned.

When his father died of asthma, while still very young, the family went through financial hardship. At the age of eight he began to sing at inns and bus stops with Rancapino to earn money. At sixteen, he won first prize at the Festival del Cante Jondo in Mairena del Alcor. Camarón then went to Madrid with Miguel de los Reyes and in 1968 became a resident artist at the Tablao Torres Bermejas, where he remained for twelve years.

== Musical career ==
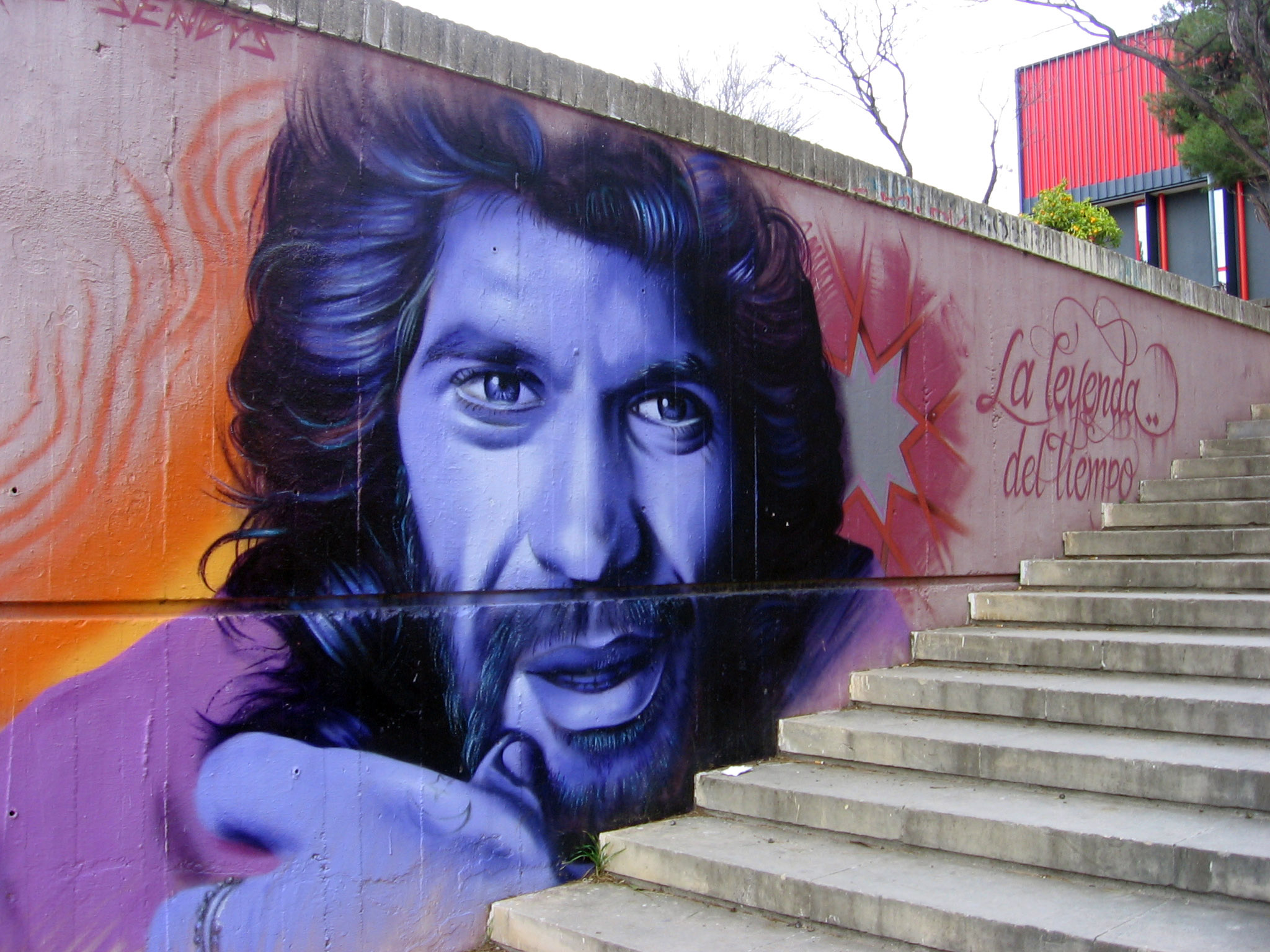
Mural of Camarón de la Isla in Barcelona in 2014

During his time at Tablao Torres Bermejas, he met Paco de Lucía, with whom he recorded nine albums between 1969 and 1977. The two toured extensively together during this period. As Paco de Lucía became more occupied with solo concert commitments, Camarón worked with the flamenco guitarist Tomatito.

In 1976, at the age of 25, Camarón married Dolores Montoya, a Romani girl from La Línea de la Concepción whom he nicknamed "La Chispa" (The Spark). At the time La Chispa was 16. The couple had four children.

Many consider Camarón to be the single most popular and influential flamenco cantaor (singer) of the modern period. In his recordings and collaborations, he sought to incorporate contemporary elements and expand the appeal of flamenco, for example by recording with the Royal Philharmonic Orchestra, whilst staying true to the genre's roots. Although his work was criticized by some traditionalists, he was one of the first to feature an electric bass in his songs. This was a turning point in the history of Flamenco music that helped distinguish Nuevo Flamenco.

When Camarón was already a recognised artist, internationally acclaimed for his authenticity and depth, he received an offer from the Rolling Stones. Mick Jagger personally wanted them to play together. According to his biographer Alfonso Rodríguez, Camarón said: "If they don't know anything about flamenco, what am I going to sing for them?" Mick Jagger called him several times and offered him a lot of money, but Camaron preferred to stay in Andalusia and not complicate his life.

He also turned down an offer from the Gipsy Kings to be part of their tour of Latin America. According to his wife, Dolores Montoya, La Chispa, they offered him "a Mercedes convertible, 50 million pesetas and insurance for what could happen" and he turned it down. For him, his family was the main priority.

== Health issues and death ==
In later years, his health deteriorated due to heavy smoking and some level of drug abuse.

In 1992, Camarón de la Isla died of lung cancer in Badalona, Spain. He was buried in a Catholic ceremony at the cemetery of San Fernando as he wanted. It was estimated that 100,000 people attended his funeral.

== Posthumous awards and recognitions ==
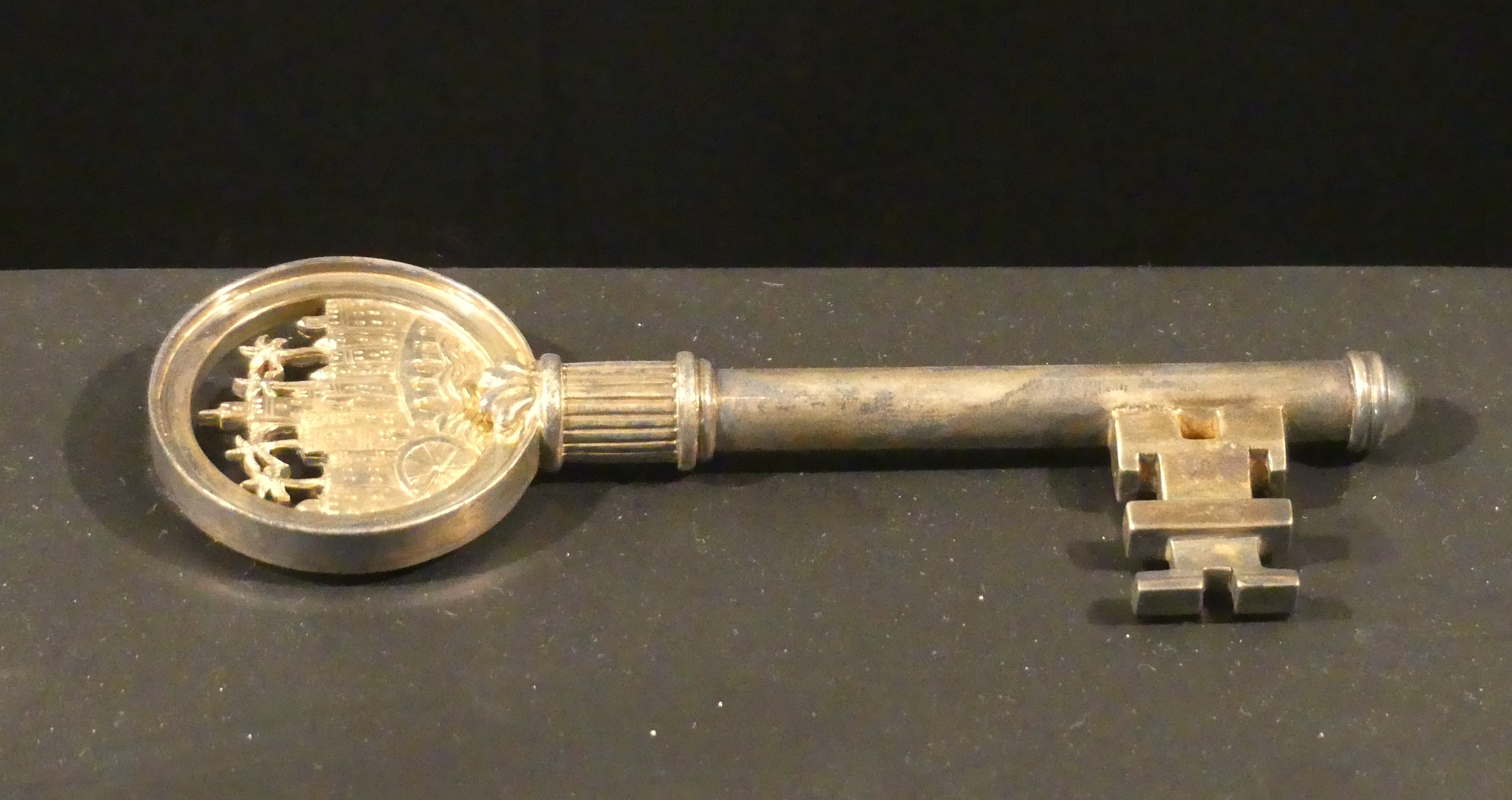
Llave de Oro del Cante received by Camaron

On 5 December 2000 the Ministry of Culture of the Junta de Andalucía posthumously awarded to Camaron the 'Llave de Oro del Cante', the Golden Key of Flamenco. This was only the fourth key awarded since 1862.

In 2005, film director Jaime Chávarri released the biopic Camarón in Spain starring Óscar Jaenada as Camarón and Verónica Sánchez as La Chispa. The film, produced in consultation with Camarón's widow, was subsequently nominated for several Goya Awards.

In 2006, Isaki Lacuesta directed La Leyenda del Tiempo (The Legend of Time), in which a Japanese woman visits Camarón's birthplace to learn to sing exactly like him.

In 2018, the documentary film Camarón: Flamenco y Revolución (Camarón: The Film), from the Spanish director Alexis Morante, was released through Netflix. In an interview, the director would say that one of his goals with the film was "to explain how the myth was built".

In 2021 a museum devoted to the singer was opened in San Fernando.

== Partial discography ==
Cover for a Camarón de la Isla and Paco de Lucía album.

With Paco de Lucía:

- Al Verte las Flores Lloran (1969)
- Cada Vez que Nos Miramos (1970)
- Son Tus Ojos Dos Estrellas (1971)
- Canastera (1972)
- Caminito de Totana (1973)
- Soy Caminante (1974)
- Arte y Majestad (1975)
- Rosa María (1976)
- Castillo de Arena (1977)
- Camaron en la Venta de Vargas (2004)

With Paco de Lucía and Tomatito:

- Como el Agua (1981)
- Calle Real (1983)
- Viviré (1984)
- Potro de Rabia y Miel (1992)

With Tomatito:

- Te lo Dice Camarón (1986)
- Flamenco Vivo (1987)
- Soy Gitano (1991)
- Camarón Nuestro (1994)
- Paris 1987 (1999)

Other:

- La Leyenda del Tiempo (1979) (Released as a solo album)
- Como El Agua (1981)
- Soy Gitano (1989) (Released with the Royal Philharmonic Orchestra, with guest appearances by Tomatito)
- Camarón: Reencuentro (2008)

Contributing artist:

- The Rough Guide to Flamenco (1997, World Music Network)

The titles given for the first five albums with Paco de Lucía are those in popular usage, being the titles of the first tracks. Formally, all of them are entitled El Camarón de la Isla con la colaboración especial de Paco de Lucía, as shown in the album cover image included above, with the exception of Canastera.
