= Richard Chapman (musician) =

British guitarist, composer and author

- Born: 9 May 1956 (age 69); Pembury, Kent, England
- Genres: Jazz, Arabic music, English folk music
- Occupations: Musician, author
- Instrument: Guitar
- Years active: 1974–present
- Label: British World Music

Richard Chapman (born 9 May 1956 in Pembury, Kent, England) is a British guitarist, composer and author. He is a self-taught musician who has developed a personal style which is inspired by a lifelong interest in landscapes and Celtic mythology and English folklore.

== Early life ==
He grew up with a diverse range of influences including jazz, classical and rock music and started playing on both acoustic and electric guitars at the age of 11. He moved to London when he was 18 and performed mainly on the jazz and improvised music scene with leading figures including John Stevens. During this time he became increasingly interested in 20th century classical composition, English folk music and Arabic music. He took up private teaching, specialising in harmony, improvisation and technique for intermediate and advanced players. After moving to Oxfordshire in 1984 he explored new approaches to traditional English folk material with concertina player Dave Townsend.

== Career ==
He returned to live in London in 1988 and in 1991 was approached by the publishers Dorling Kindersley to write a book on guitar playing. The Complete Guitarist (1993) went on to sell over a million copies worldwide. He also wrote Guitar: Music History Players (2000) The New Complete Guitarist (2003) and Guitar (Eyewitness Companions) (2005).

From 1991 until 2000 he was a part-time consultant to the auction house Christie's, advising on the Charlie Parker sale (1994) and writing the catalogue for the Eric Clapton guitar sale (1999). In 2004 he was invited by Paul McCartney to compile an archive of his instruments and their musical history.

In 2000 Richard Chapman returned to full-time playing and composing. He designed a new type of nylon string guitar in collaboration with classical guitar maker David Whiteman in 2004. In 2007 he returned to performing, leading his own group featuring harp, double bass and percussion. In 2008 he founded the label British World Music and in 2010 released Lost Places, a CD featuring his own compositions.

== Discography ==
- Lost Places (2010)
