= Pepe de Lucía =

Spanish flamenco singer and songwriter

- Born: 25 September 1945 (age 80); Algeciras, Cádiz, Spain
- Genres: flamenco
- Awards: Latin Grammy Award for Best Flamenco Album (2021)

Pepe de Lucía (born José Sánchez Gómez; 25 September 1945 in Algeciras, Cádiz, Spain) is a Spanish flamenco singer and songwriter.

The son of flamenco guitarist Antonio Sánchez Pecino, and the brother of flamenco guitarists Paco de Lucía and Ramón de Algeciras, he adopted the stage name Pepe de Lucía in honor of his Portuguese mother, Lúcia Gomes. He is the father of Spanish pop singer Malú. He released his debut recording, Los Chiquitos de Algeciras, with his brother Paco de Lucía in 1961. He continued to sing on his brother's albums until 1988, when he was replaced by Duquende. His son, José de Lucía, is also a flamenco musician, like his uncles, father and grandfather.

He is noted to have written many of the lyrics performed by Camarón de la Isla on his albums with Paco de Lucía and Tomatito. An example of one of these songs is Sentao en el Valle on the album Como el Agua.
