= Paco de Lucía =

Spanish flamenco, classical, jazz guitarist and musician (1947–2014)

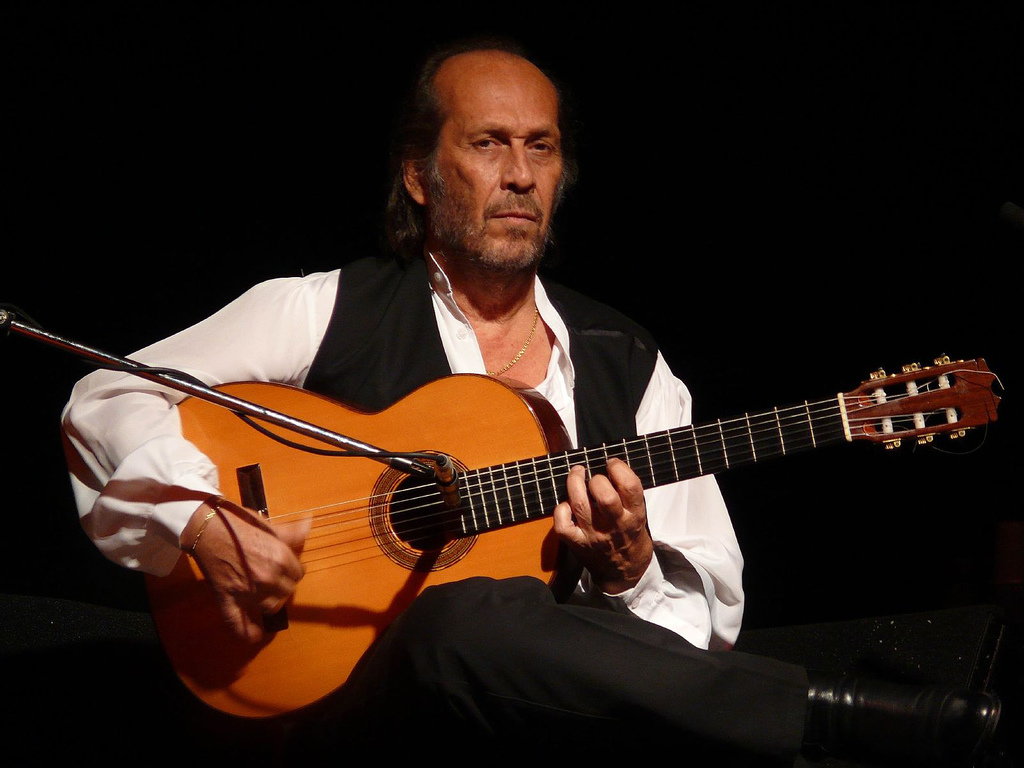
- De Lucía performing in 2007

Background information
- Born: Francisco Gustavo Sánchez Gómez; 21 December 1947; Algeciras, Andalusia, Spain
- Died: 25 February 2014 (aged 66) Playa del Carmen, Mexico
- Genres: Flamenco; classical
- Occupations: Guitarist; composer
- Instrument: Flamenco guitar
- Years active: 1958–2014
- Formerly of: Paco de Lucía Sextet
- Website: fundacionpacodelucia.com
- Awards: Prince of Asturias Award; Latin Grammy Award

Francisco Gustavo Sánchez Gómez (Spanish: [fɾanˈθisko ɡusˈt̪a.β̞o ˈsantʃeθ ˈɣomeθ]; 21 December 1947 – 25 February 2014), known as Paco de Lucía (Spanish: [ˈpako ðe luˈθi.a]), was a Spanish virtuoso flamenco guitarist, composer, and record producer. A leading proponent of the new flamenco style, he was one of the first flamenco guitarists to branch into classical and jazz. Richard Chapman and Eric Clapton, authors of Guitar: Music, History, Players, describe de Lucía as a "titanic figure in the world of flamenco guitar", and Dennis Koster, author of Guitar Atlas, Flamenco, has referred to de Lucía as "one of history's greatest guitarists".

De Lucía was noted for his fast and fluent picados (fingerstyle runs). A master of contrast, he often juxtaposed picados and rasgueados (flamenco strumming) with more sensitive playing and was known for adding abstract chords and scale tones to his compositions with jazz influences. These innovations played a key role in the development of traditional flamenco and the evolution of new flamenco and Latin jazz fusion from the 1970s. He received acclaim for his recordings with flamenco singer Camarón de la Isla in the 1970s, recording ten albums which are considered some of the most important and influential in flamenco history.

Some of de Lucía's best known recordings include "Río Ancho" (later fused with Al Di Meola's "Mediterranean Sundance"), "Entre dos aguas", "La Barrosa", "Ímpetu", "Cepa Andaluza" and "Gloria al Niño Ricardo". His collaborations with guitarists John McLaughlin, Al Di Meola and Larry Coryell in the late 1970s gained him wider popularity outside his native Spain. De Lucía formed the Paco de Lucía Sextet in 1981 with his brothers, singer Pepe de Lucía and guitarist Ramón de Algeciras, and collaborated with jazz pianist Chick Corea on their 1990 album, Zyryab. In 1992, he performed live at Expo '92 in Seville and a year later on the Plaza Mayor in Madrid. He also collaborated with guitarist Juan d'Anyelica on his album Cositas Buenas. After 2004 he greatly reduced his public performances, retiring from full touring, and typically only gave several concerts a year, usually in Spain and Germany and at European festivals during the summer months.

== Biography ==
=== Early life ===
Paco de Lucía was born on 21 December 1947 as Francisco Gustavo Sánchez Gómez in Algeciras, province of Cádiz, in southern Spain. He was the youngest of the five children of flamenco guitarist Antonio Sánchez Pecino and Portuguese mother Lúcia Gomes; his brothers include flamenco singer Pepe de Lucía and flamenco guitarist Ramón de Algeciras (now deceased).

Playing in the streets as a young boy, there were many Pacos and Pablos in Algeciras. In Spain and Latin America, any of these children with common first names would be referred to as follows: '"Name of Child", (son or daughter) of "Name of Mother"', or "Paco (son) of Lucía" in his case, instead of using the child's last name. Later, after learning to play the guitar and tasked with figuring out a way to bill himself, wanting to honor his Portuguese mother Lucía Gomes, he adopted the stage name Paco de Lucía.

His father Antonio received guitar lessons from a cousin of Melchor de Marchena: Manuel Fernández (aka Titi de Marchena), a guitarist who arrived in Algeciras in the 1920s and established a school there. Antonio introduced Paco to the guitar at a young age and was extremely strict in his upbringing from the age of 5, forcing him to practice up to 12 hours a day, every day, to ensure that he could find success as a professional musician. At one point, his father took him out of school to concentrate solely on his guitar development. In a 2012 interview de Lucía stated that, "I learned the guitar like a child learns to speak."

Flamenco guitarist and biographer Donn Pohren and record producer José Torregrosa compared Paco's relationship with his father to the relationship of Wolfgang Amadeus Mozart and Leopold Mozart in the way both fathers "moulded their sons" into becoming world-class musicians, and both continued to dictate even after the latter became famous.

Paco's brother Ramón idolized Niño Ricardo, and taught his complex falsetas to his young brother, who would learn them with relative ease and change them to his own liking and embellish them. This initially angered Ramón, who considered Ricardo's works to be sacred and thought his brother was showing off; but he soon began to respect his brother immensely, and came to realize that he was a prodigious talent, fuera de serie (out of the ordinary).

As also with Ramón, Ricardo was Paco's most important influence, and his first guitar hero; Paco said "all of us youngsters would look up to him, trying to learn from him and copy him." In 1958, at age 11, Paco made his first public appearance on Radio Algeciras. That year, he met Sabicas for the first time in Málaga. A year later, he was awarded a special prize at the Festival Concurso International Flamenco de Jerez de la Frontera flamenco competition.

=== 1960s ===
At the age of 14 he made his first record with his brother Pepe, Los Chiquitos de Algeciras (The little ones from Algeciras). In the early 1960s, de Lucía toured with the flamenco troupe of dancer José Greco. In New York City in 1963, at the age of 15, he had his second encounter with Sabicas and his first encounter with Mario Escudero, both of whom became de Lucía's mentors and later close friends. They urged him to start writing his own material, advice he took to heart. In 1964, he met Madrileño guitarist Ricardo Modrego with whom he recorded three albums: Dos guitarras flamencas (1964), 12 canciones de García Lorca para guitarra and 12 éxitos para 2 guitarras flamencas (1965).

His early albums were traditional flamenco recordings and he recorded classics such as Malagueña on the 12 éxitos para 2 guitarras flamencas album. He toured again with José Greco in 1966 and recorded "Ímpetu", a bulerías composed by Mario Escudero, for his debut solo album, La fabulosa guitarra de Paco de Lucía (1967). He appeared at the 1967 Berlin Jazz Festival. According to Gerhard Klingenstein, top jazz musicians who appeared at the festival (i.e. Miles Davis, Thelonious Monk), profoundly influenced de Lucía, and sparked a fascination for jazz that remained with him throughout his life.

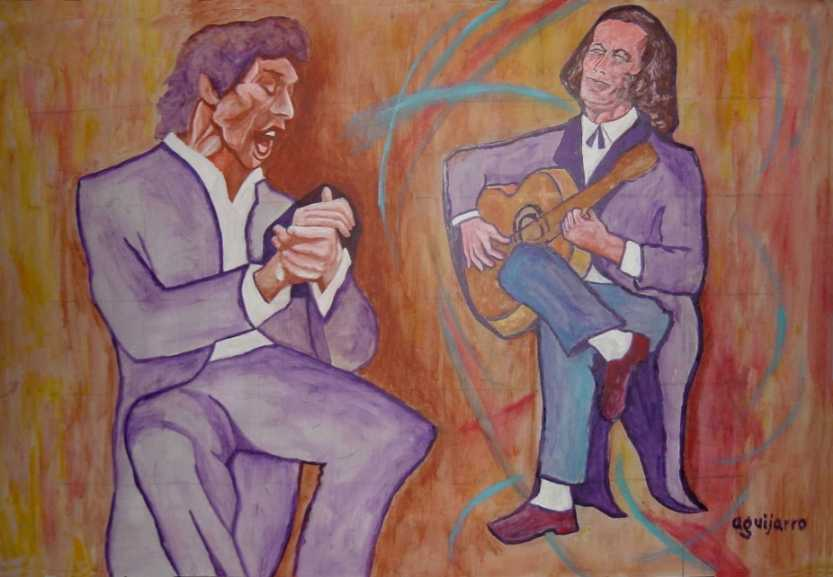
With Camarón de la Isla in a painting by Antonio Guijarro Morales

In the late 1960s, de Lucía toured Europe with a group called Festival Flamenco Gitano and encountered other new talents in the flamenco world including singer Camarón de la Isla, with whom he enjoyed a fruitful collaboration between 1968 and 1977. They recorded ten albums together and received considerable acclaim. Richard Nidel said that their partnership was "central to the history of flamenco in the last quarter of the twentieth century."

Organizers began offering de Lucía lucrative contracts for concert tours in 1967, which he declined as he preferred to tour in company, which he did with his brother Ramón, de la Isla and other musicians. De Lucía recorded many albums with his brother, including Canciones andaluzas para 2 guitarras (1967), Dos guitarras flamencas en América Latina (1967), Fantasía flamenca de Paco de Lucía (1969), and 12 Hits para 2 guitarras flamencas y orquesta de cuerda (1969). They met Esteban Sanlucar in Buenos Aires and Juan Serrano in Detroit, and during 1970 spent considerable time in New York City where they grew close to Sabicas and Mario Escudero, playing together into the night.

=== 1970s ===
De Lucía made a cameo appearance, dressed as a Mexican guitarist, in the 1971 western Hannie Caulder, playing the melody of Ken Thorne's main theme over a string section. That year, he released the album El mundo del flamenco, which included a version of Mario Escudero's "Ímpetu", a bulerías. Guitar International mentioned his "very aggressive" approach to playing "Ímpetu". Escudero was a major influence on de Lucía during this period, inspiring him to explore new possibilities for flamenco. He began working with record producer José Torregrosa.

De Lucía's 1972 release El duende flamenco de Paco de Lucía was considered a groundbreaking album in the flamenco community. As the 1970s progressed, de Lucía continued to produce groundbreaking albums and ventured into an increasingly unconventional and innovative style of flamenco with jazz influences. His next release, Fuente y caudal, acclaimed particularly for his "Entre dos aguas", which has become arguably his best-known composition, and also for "Solera" and "Cepa Andaluza". "Entre dos aguas", a rumba featuring bongos with an electric bass, means "Between two waters", referring to his home town of Algeciras, where the Mediterranean meets the Atlantic. Biographer Pohren describes "Cepa Andaluza" as a "phenomenal" bulerías, which is "accompanied by palmas, shouts of encouragement and general jaleo, and makes one want to leap up and dance." The album also features several other tracks named after Andalusian landmarks, a theme de Lucía continued in his later albums.

The Fuente y caudal album was one of the best-selling Spanish records for several months and de Lucía and Torregrosa found that the additional instruments and approach away from traditional flamenco proved more popular with the general public. The early influences of the traditional players became increasingly less apparent as de Lucía embraced jazz and other influences, creating his own voice and distinct style, yet never venturing too far from his roots.

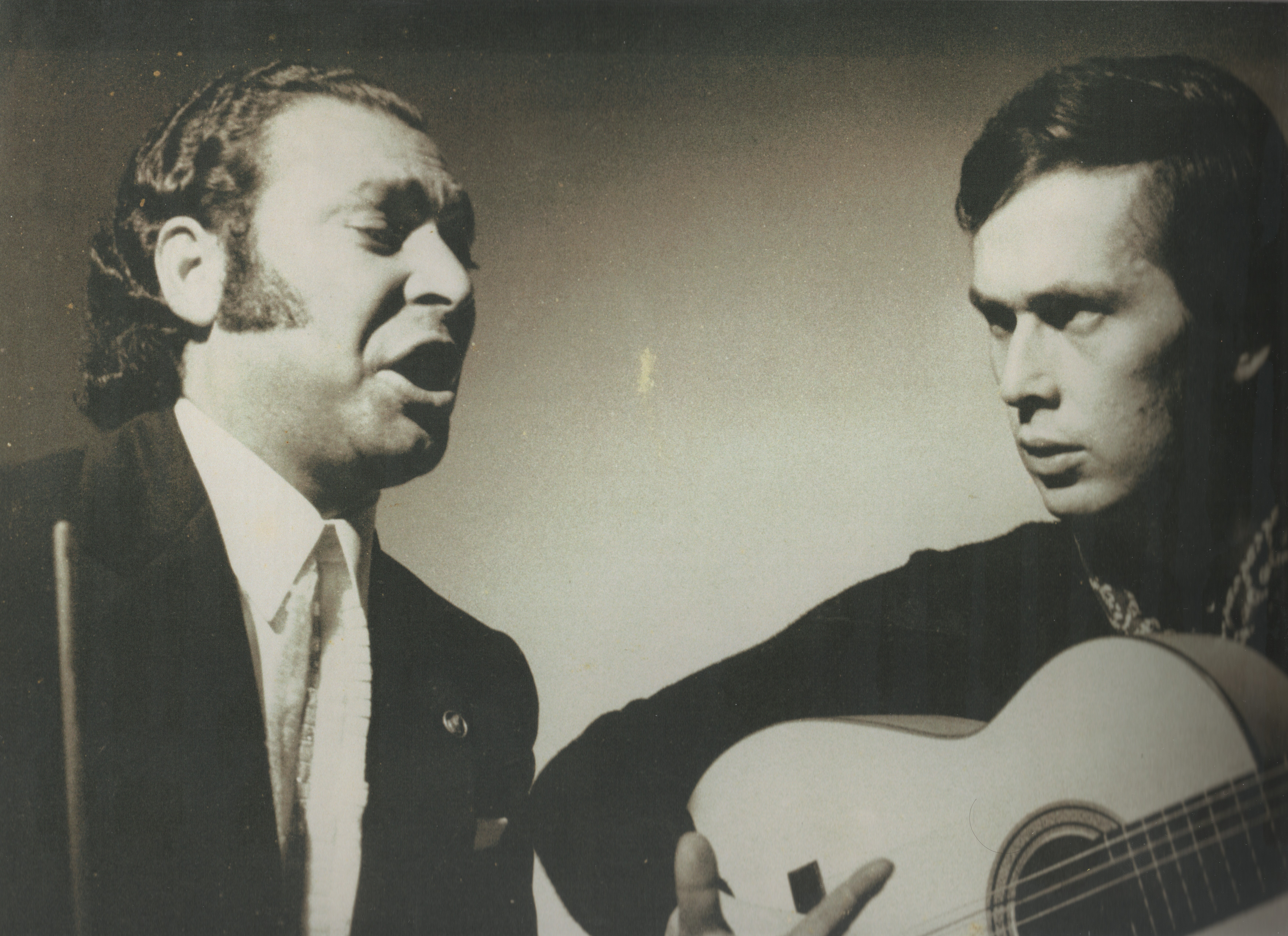
With Juan el de la Vara

On 18 February 1975, de Lucía became the first-ever flamenco performer to perform at the Teatro Real of Madrid. He played a set with his brother Ramón, in front of a relatively young audience without the use of effects. Pohren said that de Lucía's performance "was brilliant technically, and played a meaningful, moving, traditional brand of flamenco that did not betray what Paco had in store for the flamenco guitar in the future." The recording was released as En vivo desde el Teatro Real.

His 1976 album, Almoraima, was a wider success and featured "Almoraima" and "Río Ancho". The album was named after a former convent of the same name located about 21 kilometres (13 mi) from Algeciras on the road to Jimena de la Frontera, which had recently been converted into a hotel complex. The album featured significant Arabic and jazz influences especially in the bulerías composition of the same name; the name Almoraima is of Arabic origin from the Moorish period. De Lucía performed on an episode of Parkinson on BBC in the UK, in which Michael Parkinson said "a marvelous young musician who is making his very first appearance on British television. His unconventional and modern approach to playing flamenco has already made him a big star in Europe, particularly in his native Spain."

In 1977, de Lucía married Casilda Varela, the daughter of General Varela and descendant to a powerful Basque industrialist Ampuero family; they had three children. He released his final album, Castillo de Arena with Camarón de la Isla, The lyrics were written by Antonio Sánchez, with the exception of the bulerías Samara, which Sánchez and de la Isla wrote together. This would be his last LP with a singer for at least 15 years. He reportedly said that the human voice is "naturally too limited" and that he prefers the exploration of different instrumentalists; he also said a busy schedule was the reason for lack of recordings with singers.

He performed extensively across the US and Europe during this period, increasing his popularity outside Spain and the flamenco community in Europe, and met many jazz, Latin and other musicians who continued to influence de Lucía's evolution as a "Nuevo flamenco" player. He began to show a very keen interest in jazz fusion and rock, and in 1977 performed with Carlos Santana in the Plaza de toros de las Arenas bullring in Barcelona. He was invited by Al Di Meola to record on his "Mediterranean Sundance" piece for his album Elegant Gypsy. Despite considerable new interest in flamenco and de Lucía's playing generated by the album, traditionalist flamenco critics did not approve of the piece and hated that many people considered Mediterranean Sundance flamenco music and frowned upon de Lucía. Di Meola informed the critics not to worry and that "Paco is not leaving flamenco, but expanding it." In 1978, Paco and his brothers recorded Interpreta a Manuel de Falla, a classical effort of compositions by Manuel de Falla.

In 1979, de Lucía, John McLaughlin, and Larry Coryell formed The Guitar Trio and together made a tour of Europe and released a video recorded at London's Royal Albert Hall entitled Meeting of the Spirits. Pohren said that de Lucía's decision to work with musicians like McLaughlin, Di Meola, Coryell, and Chick Corea must have been an "exciting and stimulating" experience for him, given their technical musical knowledge and ability to improvise and said that they carried him "so far afield that at times he must have been profoundly confused, a man running the risk of losing his musical identity." This concerned de Lucía, who said in a late 1990s interview, "I have never lost the roots in my music, because I would lose myself. What I have tried to do is have a hand holding onto tradition and the other scratching, digging in other places, trying to find new things I can bring into flamenco."

=== 1980s ===
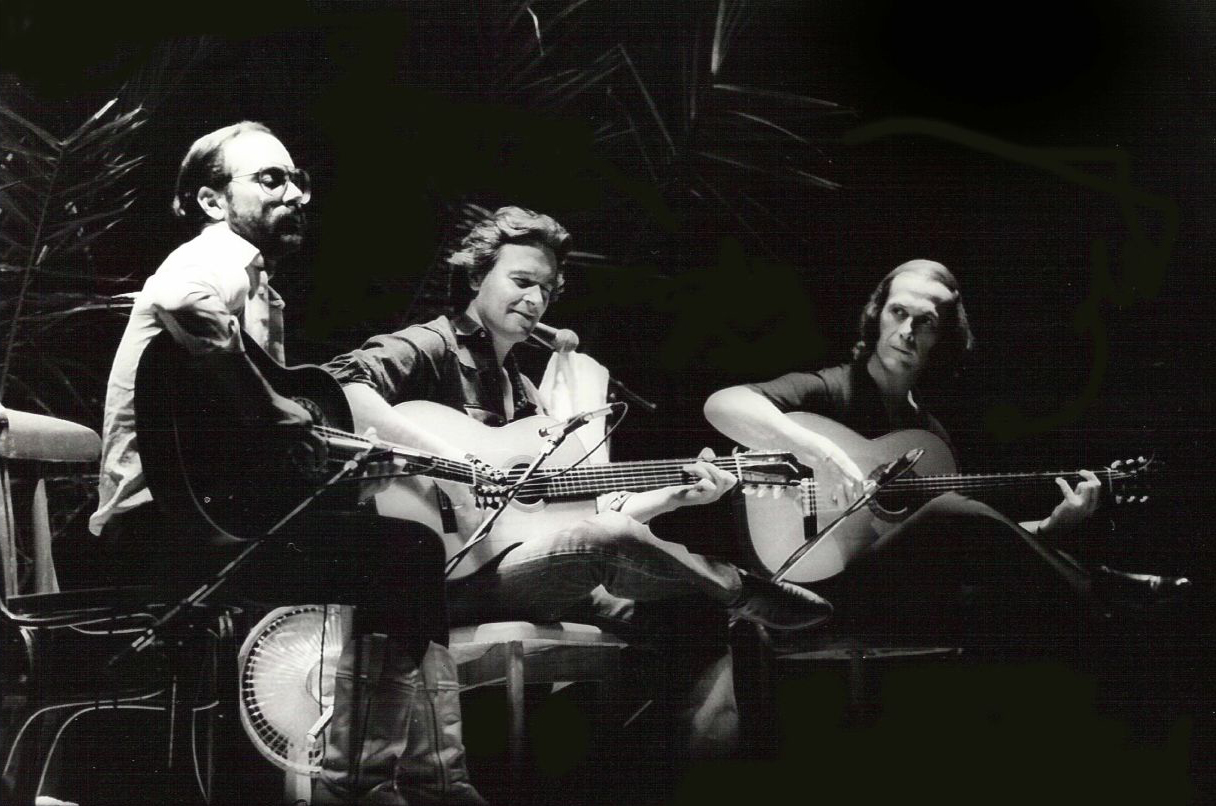
Left to right: Al Di Meola, John McLaughlin, and de Lucía performing in Barcelona, Spain in the 1980s

The Guitar Trio continued touring in 1980, with Larry Coryell being replaced by Al Di Meola in 1981. De Lucía reportedly suffered from headaches and backaches while performing because he found it difficult to improvise and follow McLaughlin and Coryell's advanced knowledge of jazz improvisation. Paco professed, "Some people assume that they were learning from me, but I can tell you it was me learning from them. I have never studied music, I am incapable of studying harmony—I don't have the discipline, playing with McLaughlin and Di Meola was about learning these things."

Also in 1981, The Guitar Trio released one of their most successful records, Friday Night in San Francisco, which sold over 1 million copies and generated a significant interest in flamenco music in America and Europe. It featured an extended combination of "Mediterranean Sundance" and "Río Ancho"; this became arguably the piece most associated with the musicians. De Lucía also formed the Paco de Lucía Sextet in 1981 (which included his brothers Ramón and Pepe), and released the first of its three albums that same year. On 30 August 1981, de Lucía performed a solo set at St. Goarshausen in Germany, where he performed "Monasterio de Sal" and "Montino" among others and later performed with The Guitar Trio. The event was broadcast on national WDR television.

Larry Coryell and John McLaughlin took part on the making of Paco de Lucía's Castro Marín (1981). It was named after the hometown of Paco's Portuguese mother, Luzia. Recorded at Tokyo in December 1980, Castro Marín remains one of the most obscure titles in his catalogue. Coryell and Paco played as duo on the fifth track, "Convite (Rumba)", and as a trio on the next track "Palenque".

After Castro Marín came Paco's revolutionary Sólo quiero caminar (1981). It was the very first to be recorded with Paco's sextet, a group that brought into being a new way to play flamenco. One of the sextet's major contributions was introducing the Peruvian cajón within a flamenco context. Percussionist Rubem Dantas came up with an original style of playing the instrument, one that became unique to flamenco. Largely due to Sólo quiero caminar, the cajón crossed over to other latin music styles, such as the tango and rumba.

In 1982, de Lucía put on a series of concerts with jazz pianist Chick Corea. Corea was a considerable influence on him in the 1980s and he and McLaughlin adapted a version of his piece "Spain", performing it live together several times in the mid to late 1980s. He released a "Golden" double compilation album in 1982, La Guitarra de Oro de Paco de Lucía, covering de Lucía's earliest recordings with Ricardo Modrego of Federico García Lorca songs to date, and featured two siguiriyas, a flamenco form in which he had not indulged in his recordings since 1972.

John McLaughlin, Al Di Meola and Paco de Lucía reconvened to record a studio album, Passion, Grace & Fire (1983). In the Spanish remaster of the album, flamenco scholars José Manuel Gamboa and Faustino Nuñez weigh in their impressions on the liner notes. Though somewhat lacking the "warmth" of the live setting of their debut, Passion, Grace & Fire is a more balanced effort. The three performers contributed with two compositions each.

Paco de Lucía had an acting role in Carlos Saura's highly acclaimed film Carmen, for which he was also nominated for a BAFTA Film Award for Best Score. De Lucía composed original film scores for several films in the 1980s, including The Hit, a 1984 film in which he provided the soundtrack with Eric Clapton, with a minor contribution by Roger Waters.

On his 1984 album, Live... One Summer Night, de Lucía not only played guitar, but also filled the role of producer. Paco de Lucía has also appeared as himself on television in documentaries and TV shows and accepted a position as a judge at Seville's 1984 Bienal de Flamenco.

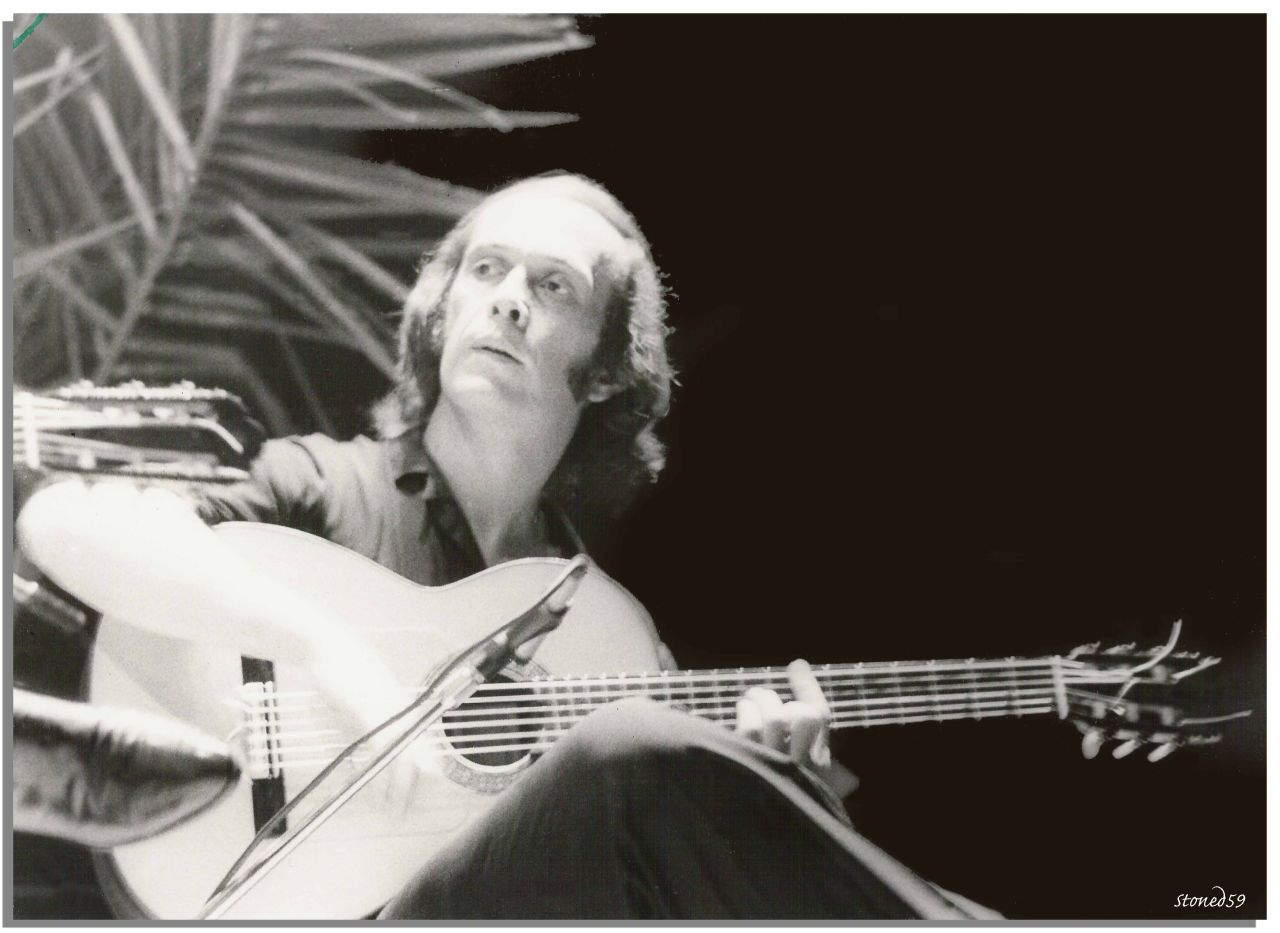
1983

By the mid-1980s, both the Sextet and the Guitar Trio had reached its plateau and stopped performing together, although de Lucía would continue to perform with McLaughlin as a duo across Europe in 1986 and later. In a 1986 interview with DownBeat magazine, Di Meola said that the reason for the breakdown was that their performances were designed to "drive the audience berserk" with a display of astonishing virtuosity and that they had run out of new spectacular fast runs to impress the audiences. Di Meola remarked that the music had become too "wild and crazy" and that he preferred to explore the quieter side of music, something Paco also felt, saying that he preferred "controlled expression to velocity." In May 1986, he performed at the Centro de Bellas Artes Rock music festival alongside the likes of Earl Klugh, Spyro Gyra, and Dave Valentin.

In 1987, de Lucía performed for the first time in the Soviet Union, and went back to his roots with his highly successful release, Siroco. Siroco is often cited as his best album and one of the greatest flamenco albums of all time.

His compositions "La Cañada", the opening track, "La Barrosa", an alegrías named after the Playa la Barrosa in the province of Cadiz, and "Gloria al Niño Ricardo", a soléa, received considerable attention and are considered modern flamenco classics. Eric Clapton and Richard Chapman described "La Barrosa", a sweet alegrías played in B major, as, "full of effortless delicacy with cascading phrases." "Gloria al Niño Ricardo" is dedicated to Niño Ricardo who was de Lucía's "first hero" of the guitar. Several of his compositions from Siroco formed the staple of de Lucía's later concert performances, and he often began his concerts with "La Cañada".

In 1989, de Lucía refused to perform at the bullring in Seville with Plácido Domingo and Julio Iglesias.

=== 1990s ===
Although the sextet had declined after 1986, in 1990 they got together to record Zyryab, a groundbreaking Arabic flamenco/jazz album with jazz pianist Chick Corea and fellow virtuoso flamenco guitarist Manolo Sanlúcar. The album is named after Ziryab, an 8th–9th century Shiraz-born poet/musician at the Umayyad court in Córdoba, credited with introducing to Spain the Persian lute, which evolved into the Spanish guitar—and according to some, established flamenco itself. One track on the album, a tarantas, is dedicated to Sabicas. The album was critically well-received; JazzTimes praised the passion and rhythm of the musicians featuring on the album.

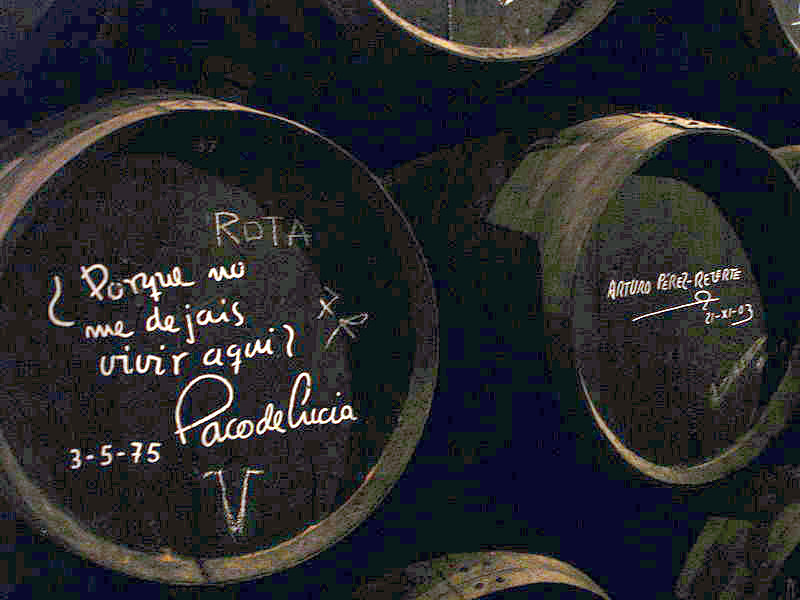
Sherry barrel signed by de Lucía

Until asked to perform and interpret Joaquín Rodrigo's Concierto de Aranjuez in 1991, de Lucía was not proficient at reading musical notation. Biographer Pohren, however, at the time of writing his biography in 1992, said that he was still not proficient and had found a bizarre way of learning the piece, locking himself away.

His performance with the orchestra under Edmon Colomer was highly acclaimed, a sensitive, atmospheric rendition that composer Rodrigo himself praised, describing it as "pretty, exotic, inspired ... I might add that Paco plays it with a great deal of feeling, far more than is normally heard. And that goes for the orchestra that backs him up." In 1992, he performed live at the bullring at Seville Expo '92, and a year later on the Plaza Mayor in Madrid, playing "La Barrosa". In 1995, he and Bryan Adams recorded the hit song and video "Have You Ever Really Loved a Woman?" on the soundtrack for the American film Don Juan DeMarco.

In 1996, his first "golden hits" album, Antología, was in the top 20 in Spain for at least 16 weeks, selling over 65,000 copies. In 1997, de Lucía performed in a tribute show to the assassinated Spanish politician Miguel Ángel Blanco, alongside Julio Iglesias, Los del Rio, and other musicians. In 1998 he released and produced Luzia, dedicated to his dying mother (hence the Portuguese spelling of her name). It is considered to be one of de Lucía's most complete and mature artistic statements.

=== 2000–14 ===
De Lucía lived for five years in Quintana Roo, Mexico, but returned to his native Spain in 2003 after professing to have become really tired with spending his whole life touring for six to eight months a year, getting up at the crack of dawn and living in hotels. He continued to keep a holiday home in Mexico though and regularly visited with his family.

In 2004 he toured the United States and Canada with Seville flamenco singer La Tana, but subsequently greatly reduced his live performances in public. He retired from full touring, and would only give a few concerts a year, usually in Spain and Germany and at European festivals during the summer months. Pohren described de Lucía as "extremely timid and retiring", saying that, "Being a very private person, [he] was dismayed at the ensuing popularity and lionization, and the increased pressure fame placed upon his shoulders, demanding that he constantly innovate and work harder to achieve technical and revolutionary perfection."

In 2003, de Lucía released Integral (2003), a 26 CD Limited Edition Box Set, and Por Descubrir, a compilation album. In 2004, de Lucía released Cositas Buenas with Javier Limón. It was released on Blue Thumb Records by Universal Music Spain S.L., and features four bulerías, two rumba tracks, a tangos and a tientos. It won the Latin Grammy Award for Best Flamenco Album in 2004 and the Billboard Latin Music Award for Latin Jazz Album of the Year in 2005.

In 2005, he was nominated for producer of the year by the Latin Grammy for La Tana's "Tu, Ven a Mi", which was de Lucía's first recording where he directed another artist since working on Camarón de la Isla's Potro de rabia y miel.

In 2004, he won the Prince of Asturias Awards in Arts, and on 23 March 2007, the University of Cadiz recognized de Lucía's musical and cultural contributions by conferring on him the title of Doctor Honoris Causa. In 2010, he was awarded an honorary doctorate by Berklee College of Music in Boston, and performed at the Montreux Festival. He was also known for some years to select countries where he did not usually perform, and played at the Arena in Pula, Croatia in 2006 and 2010, and in Turkey, Morocco and Tunisia in 2013. He appeared at the 49th Carthage International Festival on 31 July, playing at the Roman Theatre.

=== Death ===
De Lucía died of a heart attack on 25 February 2014, while on holiday with his family in Playa del Carmen, Quintana Roo, Mexico. While playing soccer with his son on the beach, he asked his wife to take him to the hospital because he felt a "strange coolness in his throat." He was taken to a hospital and was able to enter the emergency room on his own, but had to be helped into a gurney. Soon after, he lost consciousness and died.

His brother Pepe commented that de Lucía had quit a two-pack a day smoking habit 20 days earlier, and vowed to take up more sports activity after the death of his friend Félix Grande. His remains are buried at the municipal cemetery of his hometown Algeciras, Andalucía. De Lucía posthumously won the Latin Grammy Award for Album of the Year for his album Canción Andaluza at the 2014 awards ceremony. Shortly after his passing, the regional government of the Community of Madrid announced that the new northern terminus of Line 9 of the city's Metro system would be named after him as a tribute.

== Legacy ==
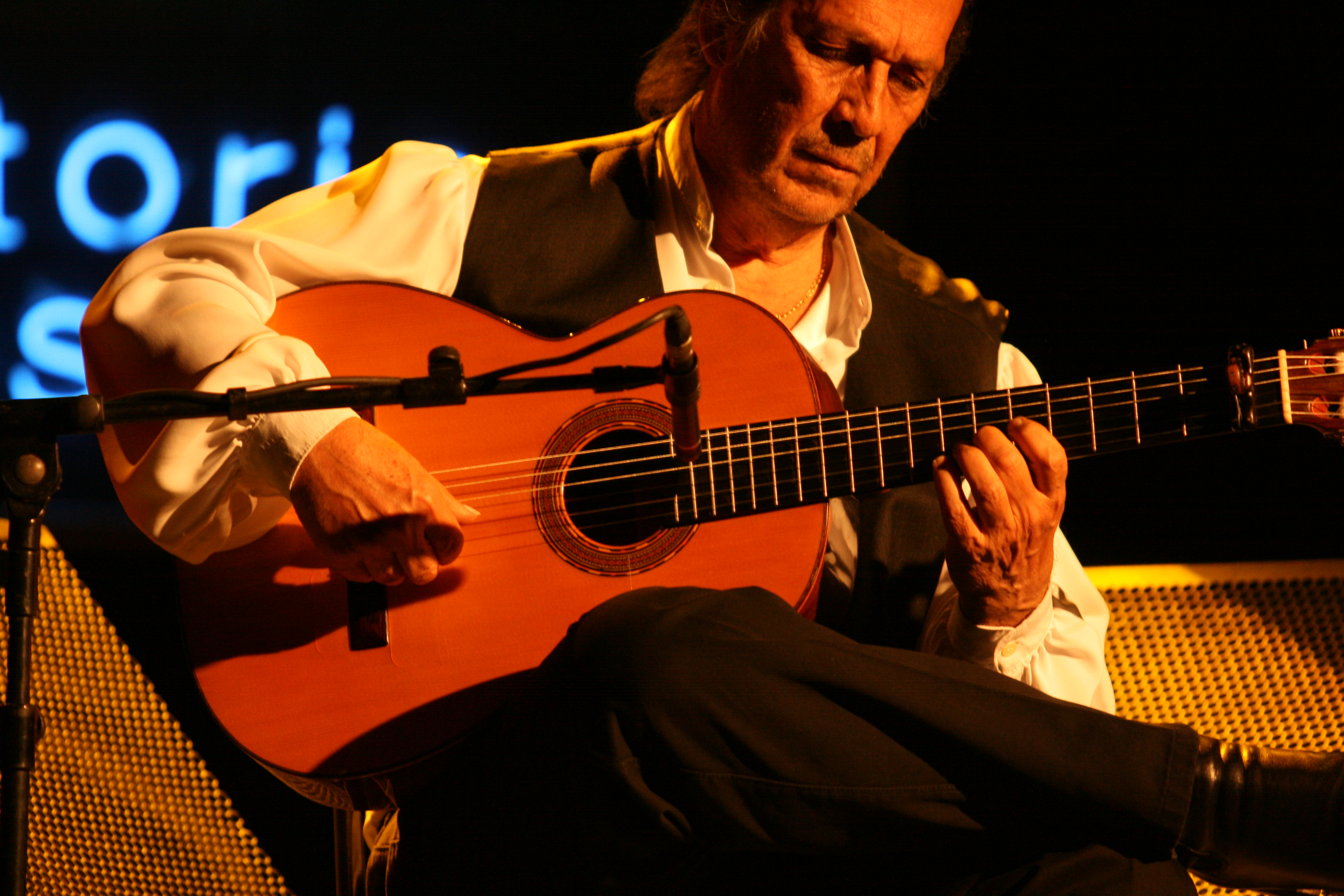
At the San Vito Jazz Festival in July 2010

De Lucía was widely considered to be the world's premier flamenco guitarist and by many to be Spain's greatest musical export. He had a revolutionary influence on flamenco music both as a composer and otherwise. His influence on flamenco guitar has been compared with that of Andrés Segovia's on classical guitar.

His album Fuente y caudal (Fountain and Flow) has been cited by many to have changed the world of flamenco guitar beyond traditional flamenco culture. Along with Enrique Morente and Camarón de la Isla, de Lucía was the first artist to break away from traditional flamenco and form what is now known as nuevo flamenco. As a composer, de Lucía was the first Spanish artist to mix jazz with Andalusian music in a more or less systematic way. This includes, but is not limited to, his collaborations with Di Meola, McLaughlin, and Pedro Iturralde.

Esteban de Sanlúcar and Mario Escudero were also major influences on him and sources of inspiration. According to biographer Pohren, de Lucía was "fascinated with jazz" and held a deep respect for high-tech jazz musicians, regarding Di Meola, McLaughlin, Coryell and Corea as highly as musicians as he did his flamenco mentors. Despite these influences, according to the Jazz Times, "Most flamenco fans can trace the music's history to either Before Paco or After Paco." In 2004 interview with El País he said "I have always found that the more technique you have the easier it is to express yourself. If you lack technique you lose the freedom to create." Like many other flamenco guitarists he often played a Hermanos Conde guitar and had his own signature model, but had a range of guitars in his collection.

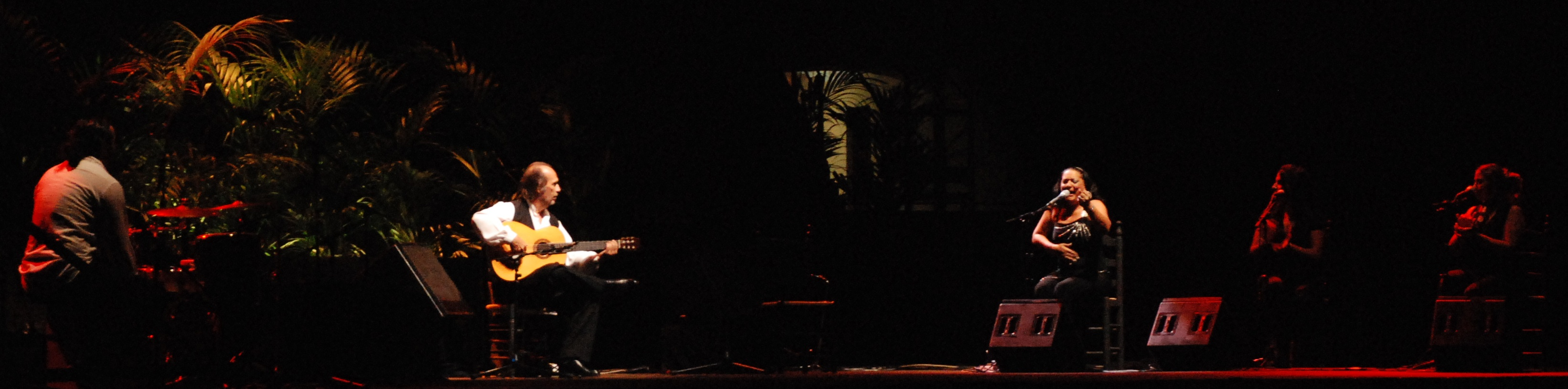
De Lucía at Gibralfaro, Málaga in 2007

Richard Chapman and Eric Clapton describe de Lucía as a "titanic figure in the world of flamenco guitar", highlighting his "astounding technique and inventiveness" and his broad range of musical ideas from other styles, such as Brazilian music and jazz. He is noted for his innovation and colour in harmony and his remarkable dexterity, technique, strength and fluidity in his right hand, capable of executing extremely fast and fluent picados. A master of contrast, he often juxtaposes picados with rasgueados and other techniques and often adds abstract chords and scale tones to his compositions with jazz influences.

Bill Milkowski of DownBeat described him as "the portrait of studied concentration and pristine perfection: stiff backed and stern faced, with a distinguished air about him that some might misread as haughtiness. He's proud and majestic, like a regal Arabian steed prancing with grace and elegance, yet able to reveal great power." Craig Harris of AllMusic noted his "deeply personal melodic statements and modern instrumentation." Atlanta magazine said, "The guitar, when used properly, can be one of the most haunting and beautiful instruments to create sound ... when he brushes his fingers across the strings, [he] can create some of the most incredible music. It's almost like a lullaby."

José Luis Acosta, president of the Spanish Artists and Editors Society stated that "Paco was and will be a universal artist, who took the guitar and flamenco sentiment to the heart of the whole world." In 2015, Billboard magazine named de Lucía as one of The 30 Most Influential Latin Artists of All Time, an editor writes: "The virtuoso instrumentalist popularized flamenco worldwide, and brought the Spanish sound to the forefront of avant-garde jazz.". In the same year, he was posthumously inducted into the Latin Songwriters Hall of Fame for his contributions to flamenco music. On 21 December 2016, Google commemorated the anniversary of de Lucía's birth with a Google Doodle created by Google artist Sophie Diao that was shown in Spain, Mexico, and several South American nations.

Another of Paco de Lucía's contributions was the inclusion of the cajón, an Afro-Peruvian instrument Caitro Soto exposed to him during his visit to Peru in the late 1970s. He understood this instrument, which he saw as a permanent solution to the need for percussion in flamenco. Along with Rubem Dantas, he added its percussive elements and it became an essential tool of contemporary flamenco and later, other international musical trends.

A statue is dedicated to his memory in his native city of Algeciras, overlooking the harbour.

== Filmography ==
A post-mortem documentary based on his life, titled Paco de Lucía: La búsqueda, was released on 24 October 2014.

== Notes ==
=== Sources ===
- Chapman, Richard; Clapton, Eric (2000). Guitar: music, history, players. Dorling Kindersley Pub. p. 41. ISBN 978-0-7894-5963-3.
- Custodio, Diana Pérez (November 2005). Paco de Lucía: La evolución del flamenco a través de sus rumbas. Servicio Publicaciones UCA. ISBN 978-84-96274-75-4.
- Newman, Paul Jared (15 September 2009). A New Anthology of Falsetas for Flamenco Guitar. Bold Strummer, Ltd. ISBN 978-1-57784-072-5.
- Pohren, D. E. (1992). Paco de Lucía and Family: The Master Plan. Society of Spanish Studies. ISBN 978-0-933224-62-9.
- Woodall, James (2001). "Lucía, Paco de". Grove Music Online (8th ed.). Oxford University Press. doi:10.1093/gmo/9781561592630.article.43211. ISBN 978-1-56159-263-0. (subscription, Wikilibrary access, or UK public library membership required)
