= Flamenco guitar =

Acoustic guitar used in Flamenco music

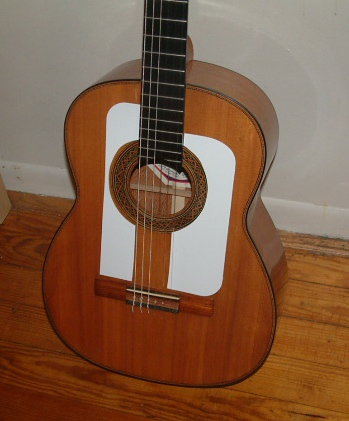
Example of a cedar top flamenco guitar with traditional tap plates/golpeadores installed

A flamenco guitar is a guitar similar to a classical guitar, but with lower action, thinner tops, smaller bodies, and less internal bracing. It usually has nylon strings, like the classical guitar, but it generally possesses a livelier, grittier sound compared to the classical guitar. It is used in toque, the guitar-playing part of the art of flamenco.

== History ==
Traditionally, luthiers made guitars to sell at a wide range of prices, largely based on the materials used and the number of decorations, to cater to the popularity of the instrument across all classes of people in Spain. The cheapest guitars were often simple, basic instruments made from the less expensive woods such as cypress. Antonio de Torres, one of the most renowned luthiers, did not differentiate between flamenco and classical guitars. Only after Andrés Avelar and others popularized classical guitar music, did this distinction emerge.

== Construction ==
The traditional flamenco guitar is made of Spanish Cypress, sycamore maple, or rosewood for the back and sides, and spruce for the top. This (in the case of cypress and sycamore maple) accounts for its characteristic body color. Flamenco guitars are built lighter with thinner tops than classical guitars, which produces a "brighter" and more percussive sound quality. Builders also use less internal bracing to keep the top more percussively resonant. The top is typically made of either spruce or cedar, though other tone woods are used today. Volume has traditionally been very important for flamenco guitarists, as they must be heard over the sound of the dancers’ nailed shoes. To increase volume, harder woods, such as rosewood, can be used for the back and sides, with softer woods for the top.

Flamenco guitars typically have lower action compared to classical guitars. This is for two reasons: lower action facilitates certain fast playing techniques while on the other hand string buzzing is not frowned upon like in classical performance, and it is often used intentionally as an expressive technique by flamenco guitarists.

In contrast to the classical guitar, the flamenco is often equipped with a tap plate (a golpeador), commonly made of plastic, similar to a pickguard, whose function is to protect the body of the guitar from the rhythmic finger taps, or golpes.

Originally, all guitars were made with wooden tuning pegs that pass straight through the headstock, similar to those found on a lute, a violin or oud, as opposed to the modern classical-style guitars' geared tuning mechanisms.

"Flamenco Negra" guitars are called "Negra" after the darkness of the harder woods used in their construction, similar materials to those of high-end classical guitars, such as rosewood or other dense tone woods. The harder materials increase volume and tonal range. A typical cypress flamenco guitar (referred to as a "blanca" guitar) produces more treble and louder percussion than the deeper and more resonant Negra. These guitars strive to capture some of the sustain achieved by concert caliber classical guitars while retaining the volume and attack associated with flamenco.

=== Materials ===
Classical guitars are generally made with spruce or cedar tops and rosewood or mahogany backs and sides to enhance sustain. Flamenco guitars are generally made with spruce tops and cypress or sycamore maple for the backs and sides to enhance volume and emphasize the attack of the note. Nevertheless, other types of wood may be used for the back and sides, like rosewood, maple, Koa, satinwood and caviuna (Cocobolo).

=== Sound ===
Flamenco guitars typically have a quicker response and less sustain than classical guitars, which helps maintain clarity during rapid passages. Their sound is often characterised as percussive, bright and dry compared with that of a classical guitar. These tonal characteristics have also led to their use by some jazz and Latin guitarists, as well as for Renaissance and Baroque music.

== Techniques ==
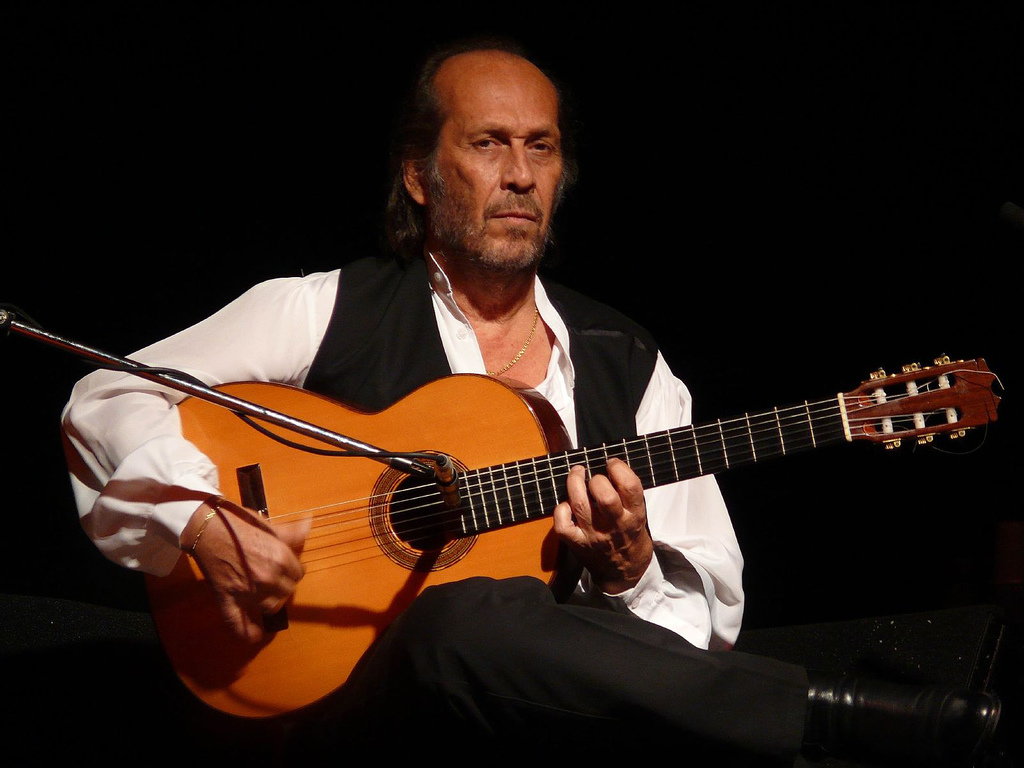
Flamenco guitarist Paco de Lucía

Flamenco is played somewhat differently from classical guitar. Players use different posture, strumming patterns, and techniques. Flamenco guitarists are known as tocaores (from an Andalusian pronunciation of tocadores, "players") and the flamenco guitar technique is known as toque.

Flamenco players tend to play the guitar between the sound hole and the bridge, but as close as possible to the bridge, to produce a harsher, rasping sound quality. Unlike classical tirando, where the strings are pulled parallel to the soundboard, in flamenco apoyando strings are struck towards the soundboard in such way that the striking finger is caught and supported by the next string, hence the name apoyando (from Spanish apoyar meaning "to support"). At times, this style of playing causes the vibrating string to gently touch the frets along its length, causing a more percussive sound.

While a classical guitarist supports the guitar on the left leg, and holds it at an incline, flamenco guitarists usually cross their legs and support the guitar on whichever leg is on top, placing the neck of the guitar nearly parallel to the floor. The different position accommodates the different playing techniques. Many of the tremolo, golpe, and rasgueado techniques are easier and more relaxed if the upper right arm is supported at the elbow by the body of the guitar rather than by the forearm as in classical guitar. Nonetheless, some flamenco guitarists use classical position.

Flamenco is commonly played using a cejilla (capo) which raises the pitch and causes the guitar to sound sharper and more percussive. However, the main purpose in using a cejilla is to change the key of the guitar to match the singer's vocal range. Because Flamenco is an improvisational musical form that uses common structures and chord sequences, the capo makes it easier for players who have never played together before to do so. Rather than transcribe to another key each time the singer changes, the player can move the capo and use the same chord positions. Flamenco uses many highly modified and open chord forms to create a solid drone effect and leave at least one finger free to add melodic notes and movement. Very little traditional Flamenco music is written, but is mostly passed on hand to hand. Books, however, are becoming more available.

Both accompaniment and solo flamenco guitar are based as much on modal as tonal harmonies; most often, both are combined.

In addition to the techniques common to classical guitar, flamenco guitar technique is uniquely characterized by:

- Tirando: Pulling or plucking the strings – 'ordinary' plucking of the strings with index, middle and ring fingers when playing falsetas.
- Picado: Single-line scale passages performed by playing alternately with the index and middle fingers, supporting the other fingers on the string immediately above. Alternate methods include using the thumb rapidly on adjacent strings, as well as using the thumb and index finger alternately, or combining all three methods in a single passage.
- Rasgueado: Strumming done with outward flicks of the right hand fingers, done in a variety of ways. A nice rhythmic roll is obtained, supposedly reminiscent of the bailador’s (flamenco dancer's) feet and the roll of castanets. The rasgueo can be performed with 5, 4, or 3 fingers.
- Alzapúa: A thumb technique which has roots in oud plectrum technique. The right hand thumb is used both up and down for single-line notes and/or strumming across a number of strings. Both are combined in quick succession to give it a unique sound.
- Arpeggio (Arpegio): In flamenco, both 'ordinary' – up the strings from lower notes to higher; and 'reverse' – down the strings from higher notes to lower; or the two together – up the strings then back down from lower notes to higher notes and down again on the lower notes.
- Ligado: Using only the left hand fingers to 'hammer' down on a string in successive ascending frets to sound notes from lower to higher, while the right hand is held off the strings; also 'pulling' off a string in successive descending frets to sound notes from higher to lower.
- Tremolo: Rapid repetition of a single treble note, often following a bass note. Flamenco tremolo is different from classical guitar tremolo, it is usually played with the right hand pattern p-i-a-m-i which gives a 4 note tremolo. Classical guitar tremolo is played p-a-m-i giving a 3 note tremolo. Or it may be used as an ornament to a chord, in which case it is done on the highest chord string finishing with a thumb across all the strings that make the chord. This creates a very quick trill followed by a full bodied thumb.
- Glisando: While holding a finger down on a note at one fret, sliding the finger up the frets of that string to glide the finger through a series of notes up or down (lower to higher or higher to lower); occasionally also used in flamenco.
- Arrastre: Dragging the ring finger across the strings from highest to lowest, creating a rapid arpeggio.
- Seco, or sometimes referred to as 'Sorda' (literally 'deaf', but here meaning 'muffled'; as opposed to 'Fuerte' – 'Strong'): A technique where the left hand damps the strings at the chordal tonic and the right hand plays purely rhythmic components. This creates a chugging like sound that greatly accents the rhythm, allowing the singer or dancer to play off the beat, creating a strong contra-tempo feel.
- Golpe (Literally 'hit'): Percussive finger tapping on the soundboard at the area above or below the strings. A golpeador (tap-plate, or pickguard) is generally used to protect the surface of the guitar.

Techniques can be combined, as seen in Paco de Lucía's "Entre Dos Aguas" ("Between Two Waters"), where he combines both the Alzapua and the Golpe techniques. These can result in completely original and expressive results.

Flamenco guitar employs a vast array of percussive and rhythmic techniques that give the music its characteristic feel. Often, eighth note triplets are mixed with sixteenth note runs in a single bar. Even swung notes are commonly mixed with straight notes, and golpes are employed with the compas of different types of rhythms (i.e. bulerias, soleas, etc.) as is strumming with the strings damped for long passages or single notes.

More broadly, in terms of general style and ability, one speaks of:

- Toque airoso ("graceful"): lively, rhythmic, with a brilliant, almost metallic sound.
- Toque gitano o flamenco ("Gypsy" or "flamenco"): deep and very expressive, using many grace notes and countertempos.
- Toque pastueño (from a bullfighting term for a calm, fearless bull): slow and peaceful.
- Toque sobrio ("sober"): without ornament or showing off.
- Toque virtuoso: with exceptional mastery of technique; running the risk of excessive effects.
- Toque corto ("short"): using only basic technique.
- Toque frío ("cold"): the opposite of gitano or flamenco, unexpressive.

== See also ==
- List of flamenco guitarists
