= Rissi (surname) =

Rissi is a surname which originates from Riss and Risse. Notable people with the name include:

- Anica Mrose Rissi, American author
- Claudio Rissi (1956–2024), Argentine actor and stage director
- Evan Rissi, Canadian actor
- Gustavo Rissi (born 1998), Brazilian footballer
- Mathias Rissi (1920–2006), Swiss New Testament scholar

== See also ==
- Rissi Palmer (born 1981), American country music artist
