= Torre Bermeja =

Torre Bermeja may refer to:

- Torre Bermeja (tower), a tower on the Playa de la Barrosa in the Province of Cadiz
- Torre Bermeja (Albéniz), a composition by Isaac Albéniz
