= Risso (surname) =

Risso is a surname, and may refer to:

- Albert Risso (died before 2008), Gibraltarian politician
- Alejandro Risso (born 1988), Argentine footballer
- Antoine Risso (1777–1845), Niçard naturalist
- Eduardo Risso (born 1959), Argentine comics artist
- Eduardo Risso (rower) (1925–1986), Uruguayan rower
- Francesco Risso, Italian fashion designer
- Gabriel Risso Patrón (born 1995), Argentine footballer
- Ignacio Risso (born 1977), Uruguayan footballer and manager
- Juan Risso (born 1942), Argentine footballer
- Mario Risso (born 1988), Uruguayan footballer
- Roberto Risso (1925–2010), Italian actor

== See also ==
- Riss (surname)
