= Museo Municipal Taurino Francisco Montes =

Museum in Chiclana de la Frontera, Andalusia, Spain

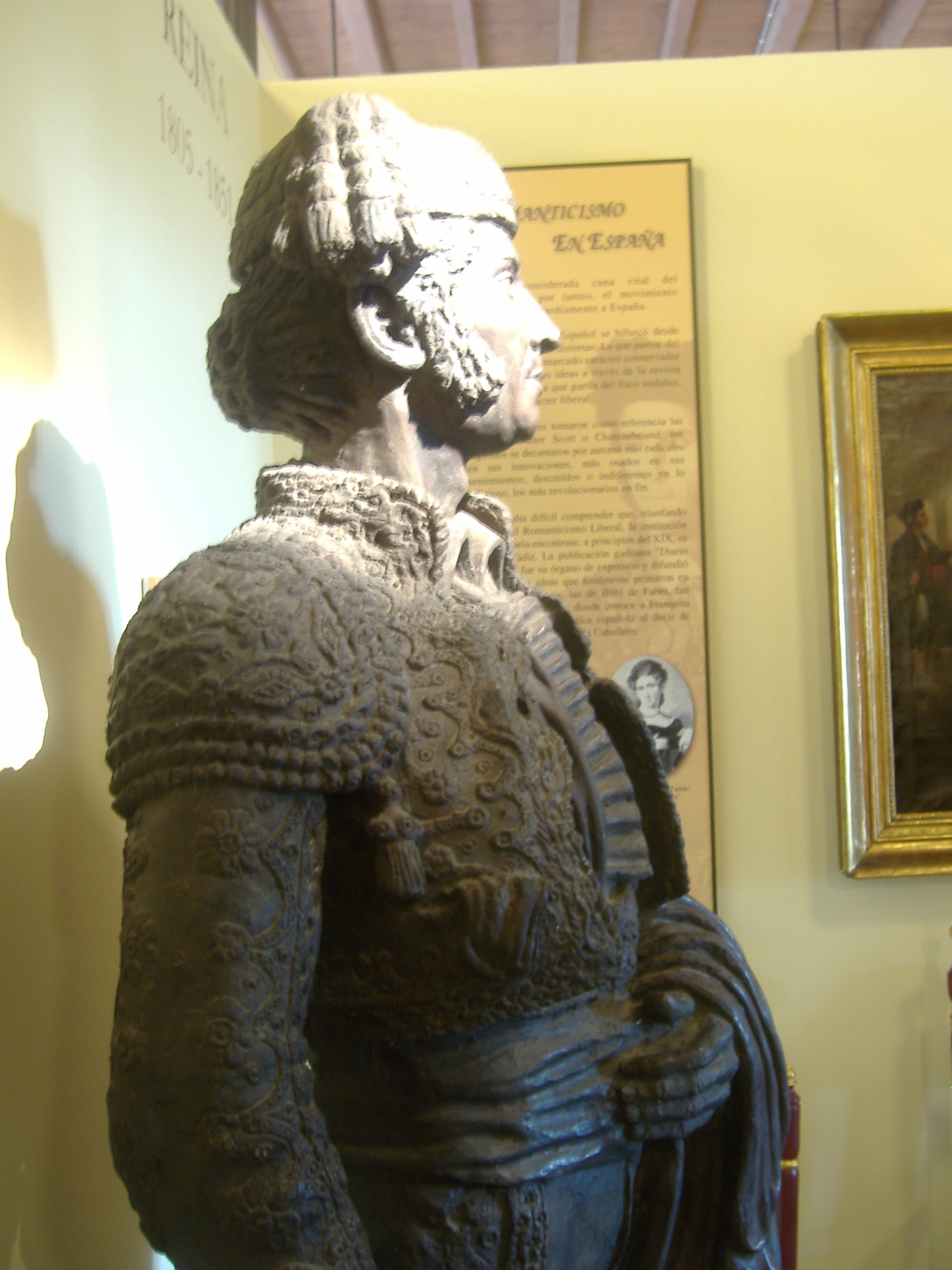
- Location: Chiclana de la Frontera, Spain
- Coordinates: 36°25′20″N 6°08′50″W
- Location of Museo Municipal Taurino Francisco Montes

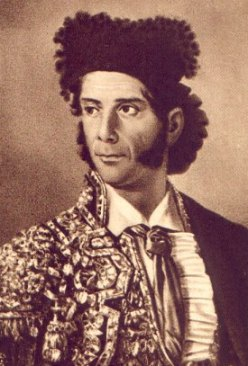
The matador, Francisco Montes Reina.

Museo Municipal Taurino Francisco Montes is located in Chiclana de la Frontera, in the province of Cádiz, Andalusia, southwestern Spain. Situated on San Agustín Street, the bullfighting museum is dedicated to the matador Francisco Montes Reina (1805–1851), nicknamed "Paquiro", who was born in this town. He is considered the most important 19th-century bullfighter, because of his skill at the sport, on foot or on horseback. The bullfighting displays include pieces of great historical and artistic value. It was inaugurated in 2003 and founded by Pedro Leal Aragon who for seven years collected objects, souvenirs and bullfighting implements. One of its first events was a group show of the artists Antonio Vela, Carlos Quevedo, and Paloma Garcia. After a renovation, it re-opened in June 2005 with miniature models of the bullring in Ronda, a head bust of Paquiro, and an original painting by Antonio Cavanna.The expansion also housed Spain's most important bullfighting collection, Collection Sagnier, which was acquired by the city to improve the historical and artistic quality of the municipal bullfighting museum.

There are four rooms: bullfighting origins, Paquiro and his time, contemporary bullfighting, and the bull and the arts. The museum's garden is used for book presentations, press conferences, weddings and small concerts. It is closed on Sundays.
