= Biss =

Biss, BISS, or BiSS may refer to

- Basic Interoperable Scrambling System, satellite signal scrambling system
- BiSS interface, software communications protocol
- Beijing BISS International School
- River Biss
- Biodiversity Information Science and Standards, scientific journal
- Radju Malta 2, Maltese radio station formerly known as Maltin Biss
- Sandskeið, a glider airport in Iceland with ICAO code BISS

== People ==
- Biss (surname)

== See also ==
- Bisse (disambiguation)
