= Chiclana de la Frontera =

- Municipality
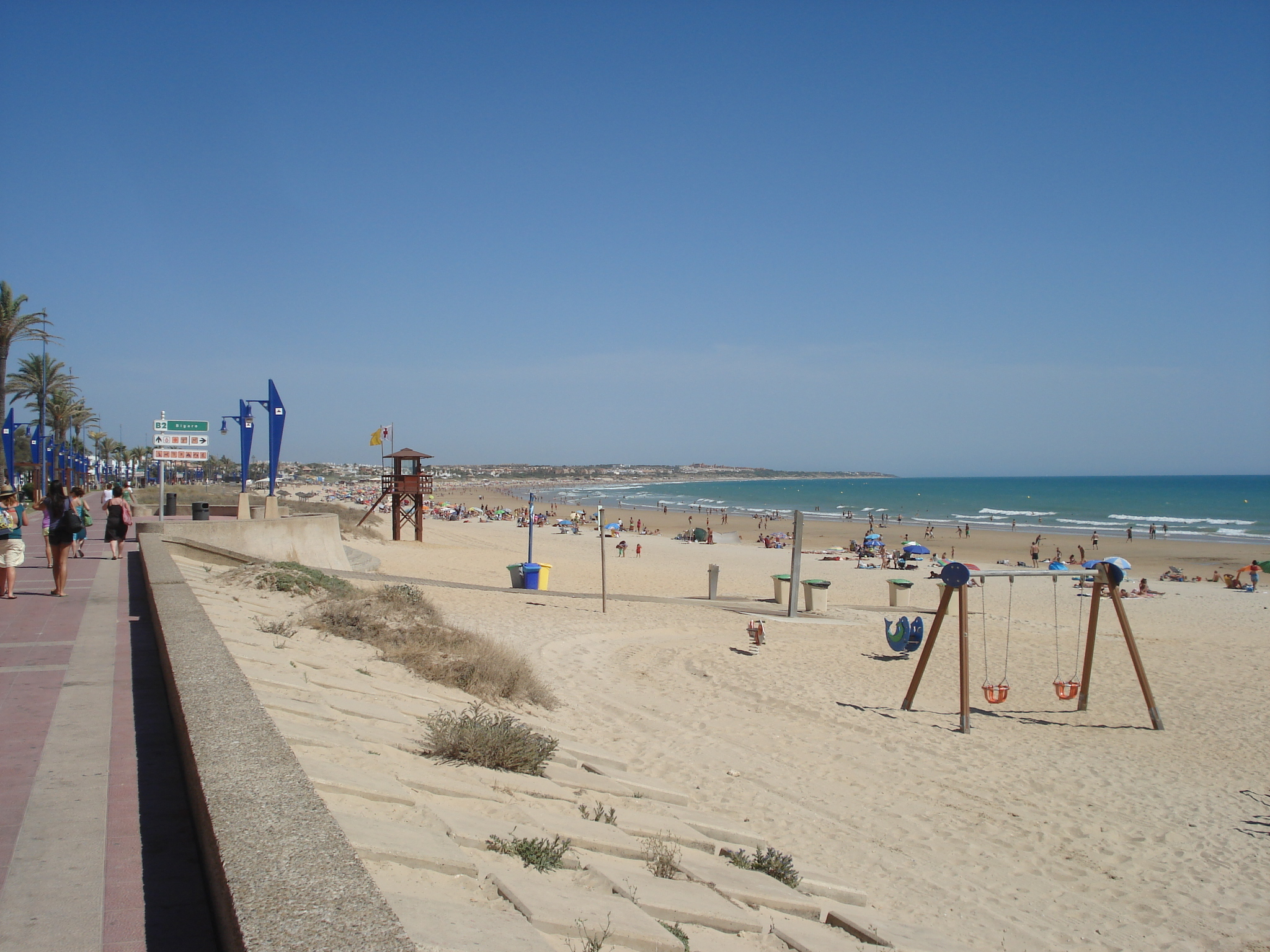
- Playa de la Barrosa

- Flag Coat of arms

- Location in the Province of Cádiz Location in Andalusia Location in Spain
- Coordinates: 36°25′N 6°9′W
- Country: Spain
- Autonomous community: Andalusia
- Province: Cádiz
- Comarca: Bay of Cádiz
- Commonwealth: Municipios de la Bahía de Cádiz

Government
  - Mayor: José María Román Guerrero (PSOE)

Area
  - Total: 205.45 km^{2} (79.32 sq mi)
- Elevation: 11 m (36 ft)

Population (2025)
  - Total: 90,864
  - Density: 442.27/km^{2} (1,145.5/sq mi)
- Demonym: Chiclaneros
- Time zone: UTC+1 (CET)
  - Summer (DST): UTC+2 (CEST)
- Postal code: 11130
- Dialing code: 956
- Website: Official website

Chiclana de la Frontera (Spanish pronunciation: [tʃiˈklana ðe la fɾonˈteɾa]) is a town and municipality in southwest Spain, in the province of Cádiz, Andalucía, near the Gulf of Cádiz. It belongs to the association of municipalities of the Bay of Cádiz (Bahía de Cádiz), the provincial capital of Cádiz, Jerez de la Frontera, San Fernando, El Puerto de Santa María, Puerto Real and Rota which form the third largest metropolitan area in Andalusia, behind Seville and Málaga, and the twelfth largest in Spain. It is located 20 kilometres (12 miles) south-east of Cádiz, and borders the municipalities of San Fernando and Puerto Real to the north and Conil de la Frontera to the south. In 1877, the municipality's population was 11,677; in 2012, it was 81,473. It has a surface area is 203 square kilometres (78 sq mi) and a population density of 401 inhabitants / km^{2}. The average elevation is 11 metres (36 ft) above sea level. The economy depends largely upon modern industry, especially salt processing, and tourism, and the municipality is known for its beaches such as the 6 kilometres (3.7 mi) long Playa de la Barrosa, hotels and golf courses in the resort of Novo Sancti Petri. The municipality contains the largest number of hotel beds in the Province of Cádiz and the Costa de la Luz. The town's newspaper, Viva Chiclana is distributed on Thursday mornings.

== History ==
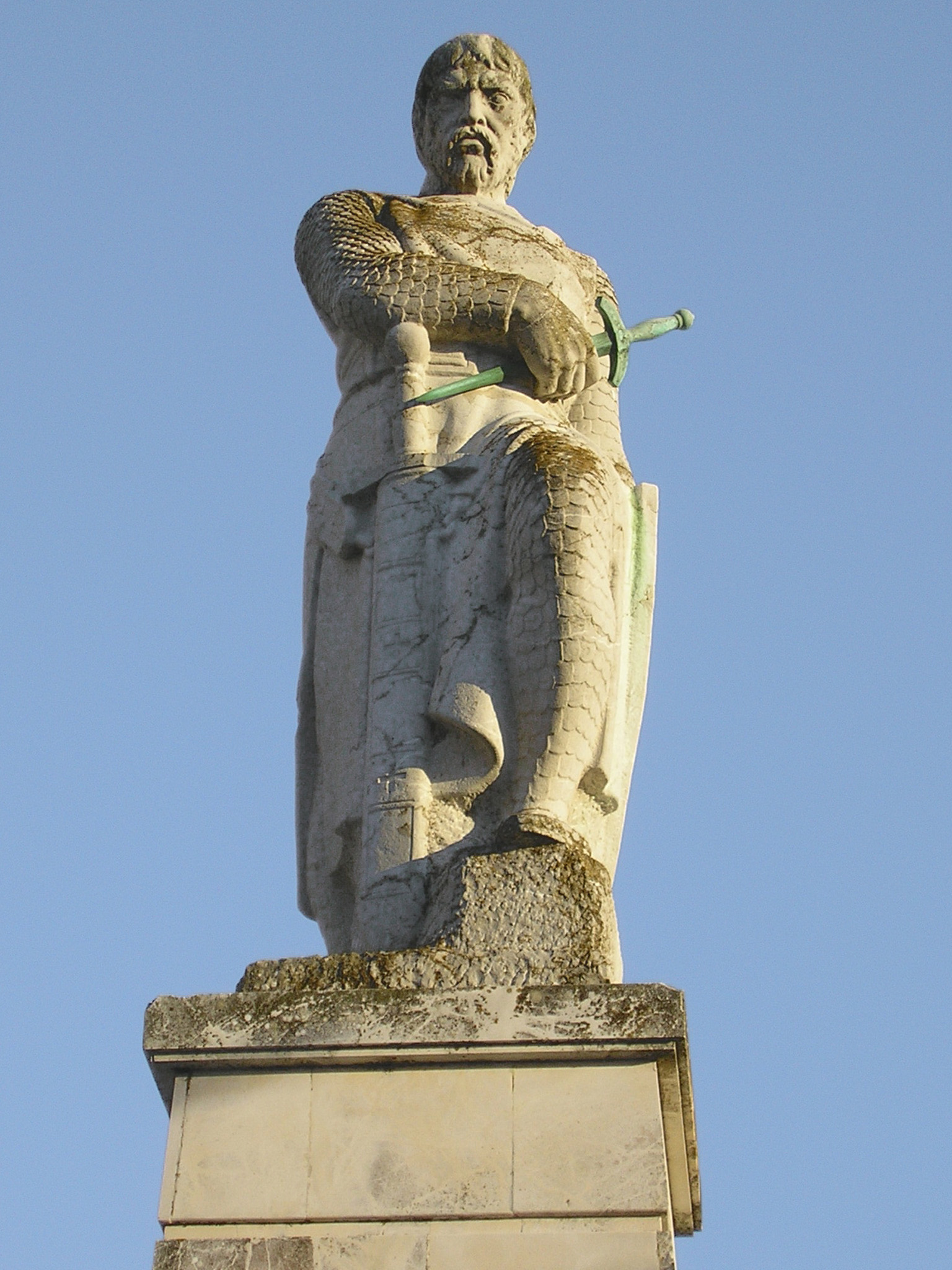
Statue of Alonso Pérez de Guzmán (Tarifa, Cádiz)

Human presence in the area dates back to Paleolithic times. Several Neolithic villages have been discovered, including that of La Mesa a few miles east of the town. The early history of the area is marked by the Phoenician and Punic presence. In 2006 preliminary building work was halted by the discovery of the remains of buildings, walls, cisterns, silos, pavements and ovens on the hill overlooking the river; El Cerro del Castillo. Subsequent excavations suggested that the site had been inhabited from the Late Bronze onwards. It was prized for its strategic position guarding the route up-river to Gerion's Castle at Medina Sidonia, overlooking an access to the bay of Cadiz, and its wharfs or docks. Much of the site was irretrievably lost to aggressive quarrying for sand and stone, but the traces of the medieval streets and cemetery can still be discerned on the hill's slopes. In 2023 an interpretation centre "La Nueva Gadeira" opened to the public on the site. It offers explanations and displays the excavation of a portion of the site under an impressive glass floor. Archeological finds from the area are displayed in the local Museum and in the Museum of Cadiz. A mention should be made of the tiny temple island at Santi Petri, in which Hannibal Barca prayed before his famous invasion of Italy. When the Romans took over, the temples were rebuilt and used by them.The names change but the rituals remain the same.Several bronzes and a roman marble statue of the 2nd century have been found in the waters off Sancti Petri.

Alonso Pérez de Guzmán (1256–1309) entered the town in 1303, having been granted it as a reward for services rendered to the crown of Castille, and his possessions in Southern Spain eventually led to the foundation of the dukedom of Medina-Sidonia. The Battle of Barrosa, an unsuccessful attempt to raise the siege of Cadiz took place 5 miles (8.0 km) south of Chiclana on 5 March 1811. During the Spanish War of Independence came the Battle of Chiclana, which took place in the town between the French and an Anglo-Spanish alliance. In 1900, tenders were invited by the municipal authorities of Chiclana de la Frontera, for an electric lighting concession of the town. The castle of Sancti Petri was visited in 1930 by the composer Manuel de Falla.

== Geography and climate ==
Chiclana de la Frontera is located on the Costa de la Luz in Andalusia, on the southwest coast of the province of Cádiz. The municipality borders Puerto Real to the north, San Fernando to the north-northwest and Conil de la Frontera to the south-southeast. The town itself is located about 20 kilometres (12 mi) southwest of the city of Cádiz and is about 95 kilometres (59 mi) northwest of Algeciras.Medina-Sidonia lies about 24 kilometres (15 mi) east of the town of Chiclana. Villages in the municipality include La Coquina, Los Gallos Cerromolinos, Pinar de los Guisos, Llano de las Maravillas, La Barrosa, Novo Sancti Petri, Melilla, Campano, El Olivar, Torre del Puerco, El Colorado, Barrio Nuevo, Hozanejos and Pago del Humo and Las Veguetas, although it is difficult to distinguish the exact boundaries of many of the settlements as many of the villages are joined.

The coastline is characterised by long sandy beaches, including those at Sancti Petri, the 6 kilometres (3.7 mi) long La Barrosa and La Loma del Puerco. Chiclana has an average elevation of 11 metres (36 ft) , the highest point being Cerro del Aguila at 52.3 metres (172 ft) above sea level. Another high point and landmark is Cerro de Santa Ana, located at 49.8 metres (163 ft). There are numerous hills to the northeast of the municipality. The municipality and town of Chiclana is crossed by the mineral rich River Iro which rises in the east near Medina Sidonia and runs into the sea at Sancti Petri. The relief of the land in the municipality is irregular but smooth, with slight undulations.

Chiclana's climate, as in the Bay of Cádiz, is typical of the southern Atlantic coast of Spain. The town is humid with an average temperature around 19 °C (66 °F), approaching the maximum 30 °C (86 °F) in August, with minimum temperatures of 2 °C (36 °F) in January. The town has approximately 3,000 hours of sunshine a year. The average rainfall is about 600 mm (24 in), with December the wettest month and the summer months the driest, but at times the municipality can receive heavy rainfall and adverse weather conditions, making the town vulnerable to flooding. The wind ranges between 10 and 15 km/h (6 and 9 mph). The strongest winds usually rises in the east or southwest during the summer and late autumn and spring. The municipality has a number of pine, olive, oak and chaparral trees growing within it and contains the Parque Forestal Municipal "Pinar del Hierro y de la Espartosa"; the park is popular with hikers and mountain bikers.

== Economy ==
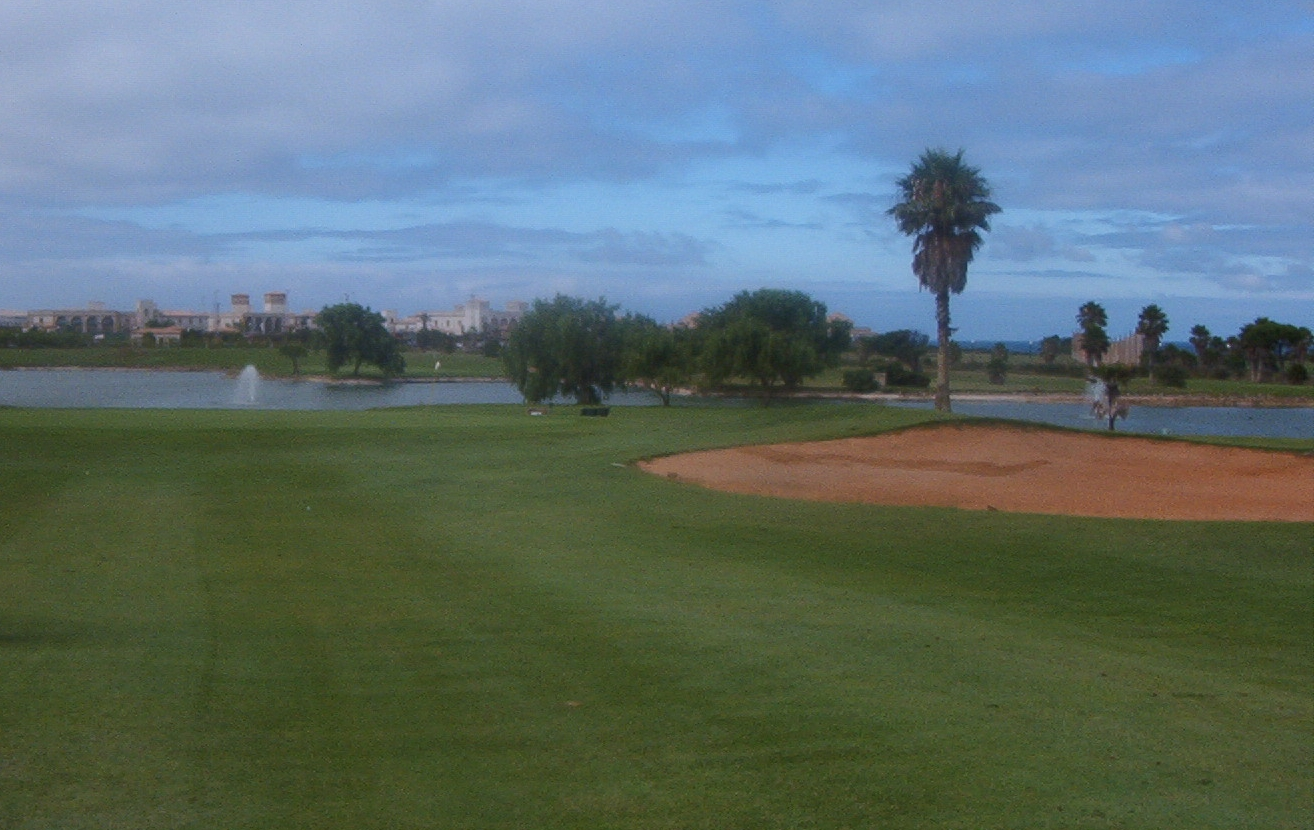
Golfo Novo Sancti Petri

La Fontanar was a pottery producing center in Chiclana de la Frontera which manufactured amphoras and other ceramics, possibly dating to before the reign of Augustus. In the 19th century Chiclana still manufactured linen and earthenware, and produced Sherry, while tourists visited the mineral baths. Today's economy depends largely upon modern industry, especially salt processing and tourism. The municipality is known for its beaches such as the 6 kilometres (3.7 mi) long sandy Playa de la Barrosa, and the many hotels and golf courses in the resort of Novo Sancti Petri. The Rough guide to Andalucía describes Novo Sancti Petri as "a complex of hundreds of identical avenues lined with featureless tile-roofed dwellings, ugly lamp standards, over-manicured gardens and a golf course designed by Severiano Ballesteros." The municipality contains the largest number of hotel beds in the province of Cádiz and the Costa de la Luz and has about 20 luxury hotels which have either four or five stars. Notable golf courses include the 36-hole Club de Golf Novo Sancti Petri, the 18-hole Club de golf Melia Sancti Petri, the 9-hole Club de Golf Campano, European Golfes Academy, Escuela de golf Practeegolf and Campo de golf Lomas de Sancti Petri. The Playa de la Barrosa beach stretching south from the point of Sancti Petri also has many restaurants, bars, and shops. The town centre of Chiclana itself is located around the town hall square and has a busy market where fruit and vegetables are sold, as well as fish and meat stalls; retailers from rural parts come to the town to sell items such as wild asparagus, snails and herbs. The Tuesday and Sunday markets are held near the blue bridge over the River Iro. Aside from the town's salt processing reputation, it is also a centre for furniture manufacturing and contains many furniture stores along the Avenida de los Descubrimientos.

The area is a fertile region, with much agriculture, including vineyards. Grapes have been grown in the area for many centuries and this area is recognised as having had considerable significance in the field of winemaking, especially in the 16th century with the rise of trade and the new discoveries in the Americas, when land was increasingly converted to produce wine for export to America, Flanders, England, France and Portugal. The industry reached its peak during the 19th century, which was when it had the most land devoted to the growing of grapes and the largest number of wineries. Currently, Chiclana has many different wineries, where fine wines both fragrant and muscatel are grown, and the wineries are visited by many tourists. The town is noted for its sherry, and Chiclana de la Frontera has been cited as one of the world's finest wine-producing areas. La Bodega Cooperativa Unión de Viticultores Chiclaneros, incorporated as a cooperative in 1992, is one of several local wineries currently in operation.

== Main sights ==
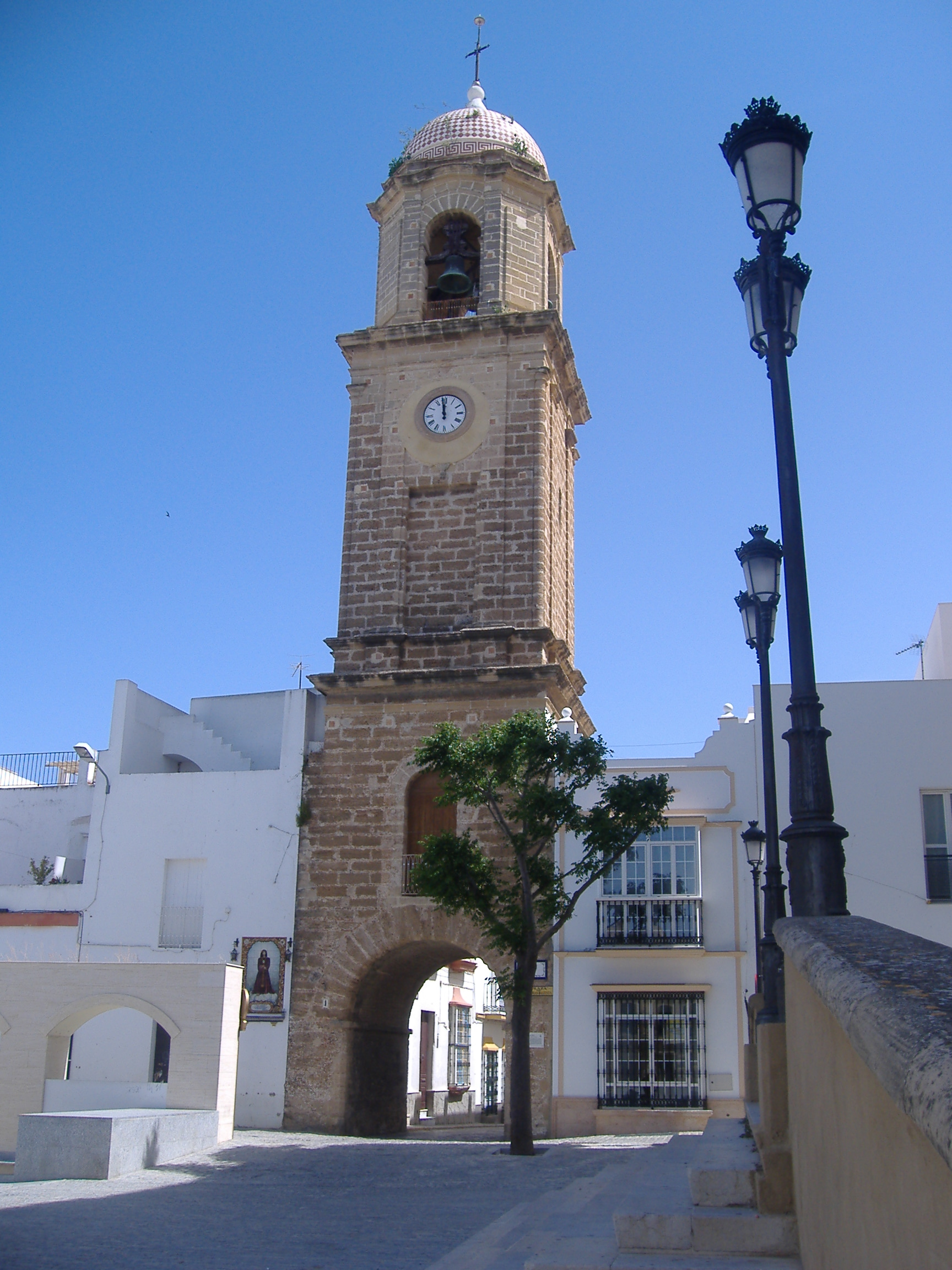
Torre del Reloj (plaza mayor).

=== Towers ===
There are three significant towers in the area. The Torre del Puerco (36.331186°N 6.161276°W) dates to the 16th century, but later was used as a defensive post during the Battle of Barrosa in 1811. The Torre Bermeja (36.374989°N 6.191318°W) is a defensive tower located on the Playa de la Barrosa. The Torre del Reloj (36.418191°N 6.146216°W) is the clock tower, popularly known as Arquillo del Reloj, and is one of the most emblematic buildings of Chiclana, located on the Plaza Mayor. It was built in the 18th century on one of the ancient gates of the town, and was originally part of the old Town Hall. It consists of four sections, with an octagonal bell tower and dome topped with a Latin cross.

=== Civic buildings ===
The historic city center is home to several examples of neoclassical architecture and Elizabethan houses that belonged to the nobility and gentry of Cádiz, built to enrichment of the area thanks to trades with America. The Plaza Mayor is the oldest public space and historic interest of Chiclana. It was the center of the village during the 15th to the 18th centuries, containing the only parish jail. Casa Briones, located on the Plaza Mayor is one of the finest examples of 18th-century buildings in the city and is attributed to the neoclassical architect Torcuato Cayon; it currently houses the Museo de Chiclana. The town hall, Casa Consistorial, was originally built on the palatial residence of Alejandro Risso in the 18th century. In 2011, a new building was inaugurated by the President of the Junta de Andalucía, José Antonio Griñan. Built on the former, the latter has an area of about 5,000 square metres, divided over four floors. It is a large, modern building, adapted to the needs of local administration in Chiclana in the 21st century. The original building had no architectural interest, so only the main façade of the old building was preserved, along with the first bay, and the imperial staircase.

=== Castles and palaces ===
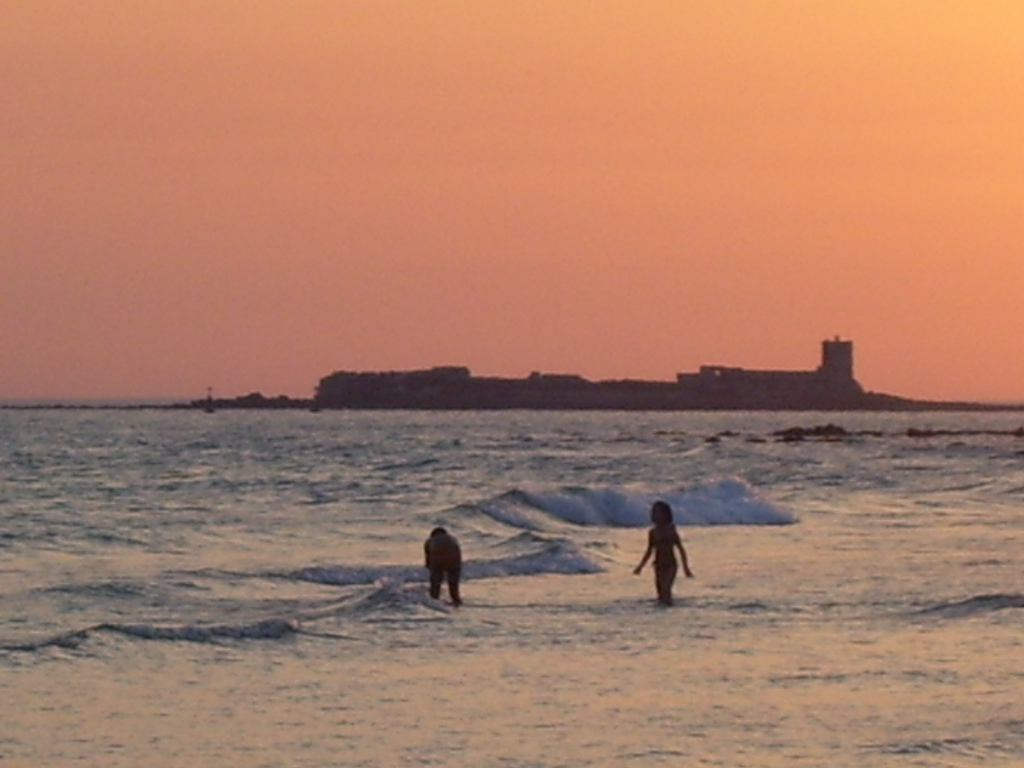
Castillo de Sancti Petri from the beach of La Barrosa.

The Castillo de Sancti Petri was reconstructed during the 13th century and is now in a ruined state. The Casa-palacio del Conde de Torres is located in the Plaza del Retortillo of this city, named in honor of José de Retortillo who was awarded a knighthood in 1738 by the then reigning monarch Philip IV. It is a mansion of two stories with stylistic influences of the neoclassical period, but also featuring decorative elements of the baroque. Today the house has ceded part of its private garden to the city, which maintains it as a green area for public use.

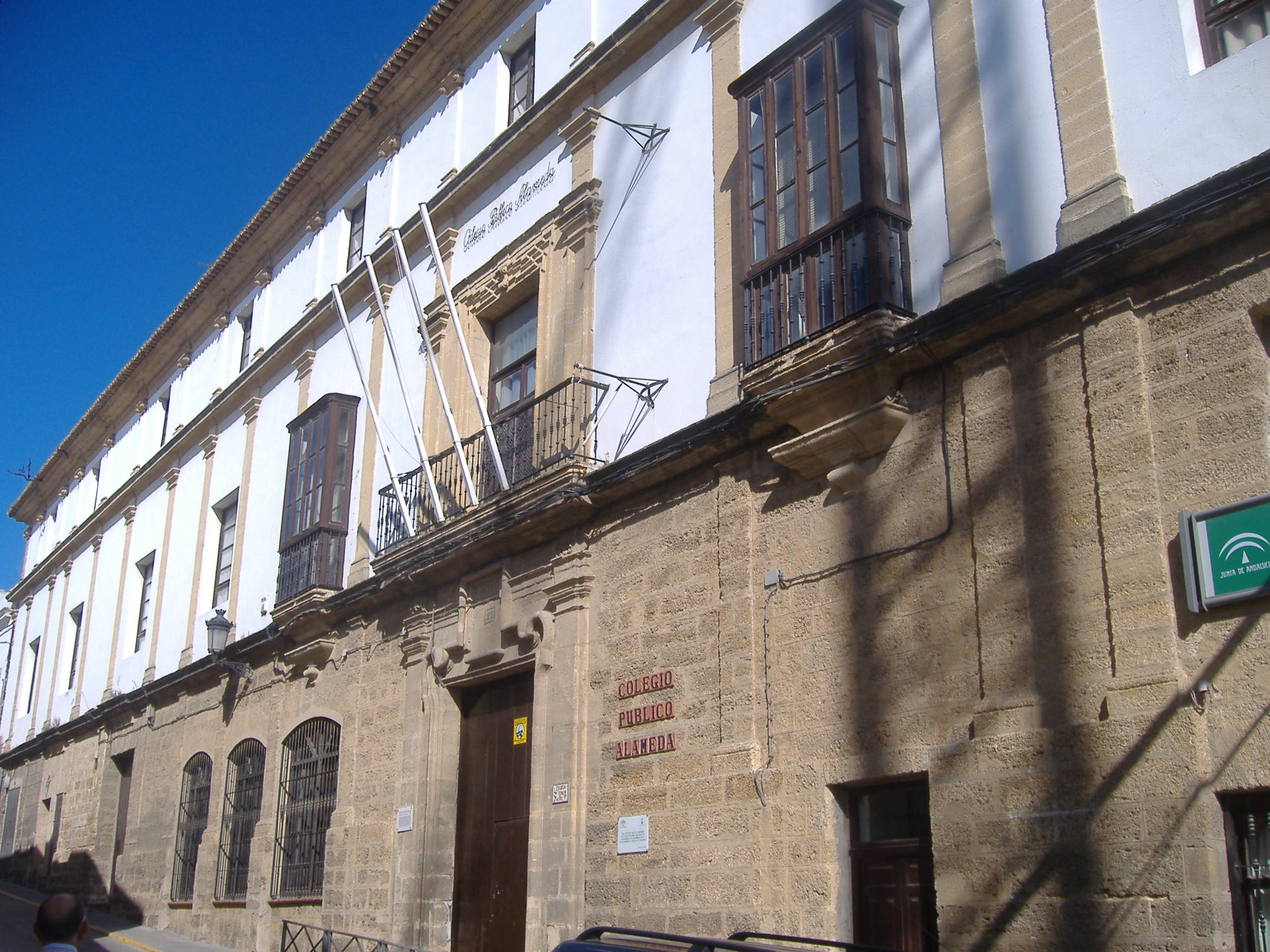
Chiclana Casa del Conde del Pinar.

Casa-palacio del Conde del Pinar is located in the central Calle Fierro. It is named after Conde del Pinar, an important character of French origin who arrived in the city of Cádiz, who like many others was attracted by economic expansion as a result of their trade with America. Built during the 18th century, it shows the evolution of the neoclassical baroque, mixing elements of both styles. It has a high façade exterior with three floors and is structured with stone pillars. Inside is a square courtyard with columns and marble floors and the original staircase. Currently it is used for cultural activities, including a school. The Casa-palacio del Conde de las Cinco Torres is located in the centre of the city on the Calle García Gutiérrez, and as far as the mid-19th century dominated the neighborhood of San Alejandro. The house is perhaps the best example of a neo-classical mansion in the city, built during the 18th century at the time of greatest economic boom in Cádiz. The exterior has a stone façade, two stories high and with six pilastres.

=== Churches ===
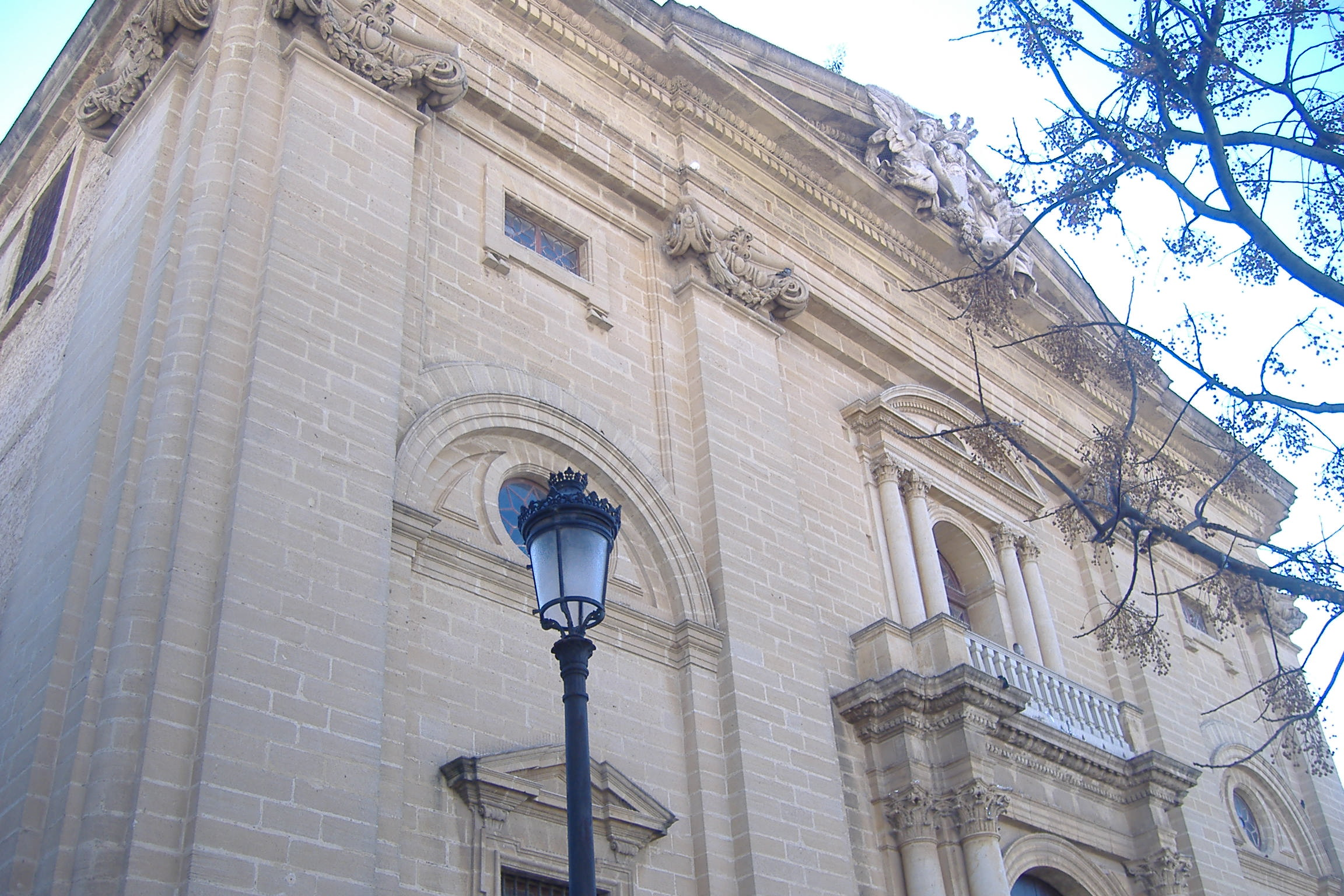
Iglesia Mayor de San Juan Bautista.

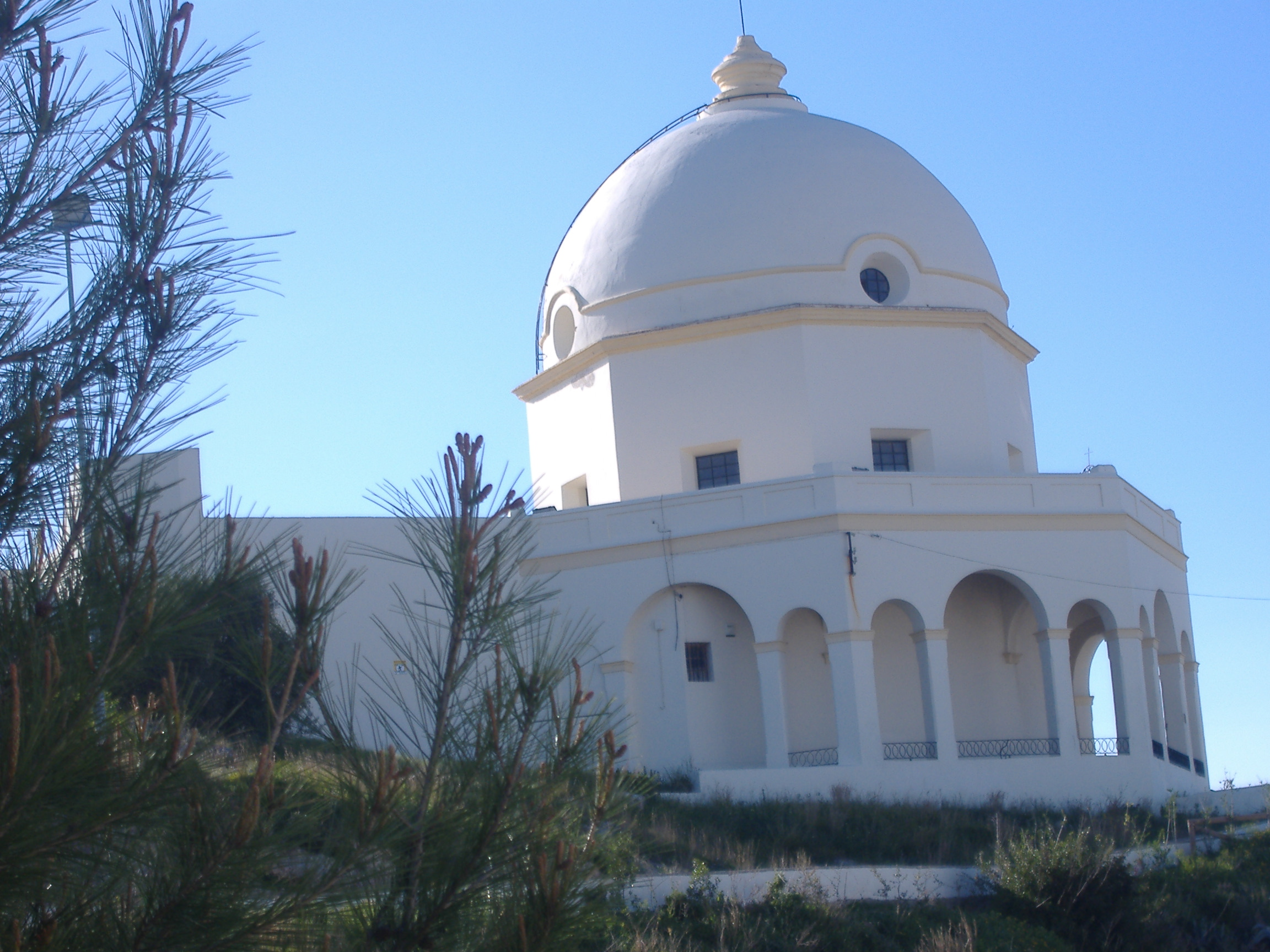
Ermita de Santa Ana.

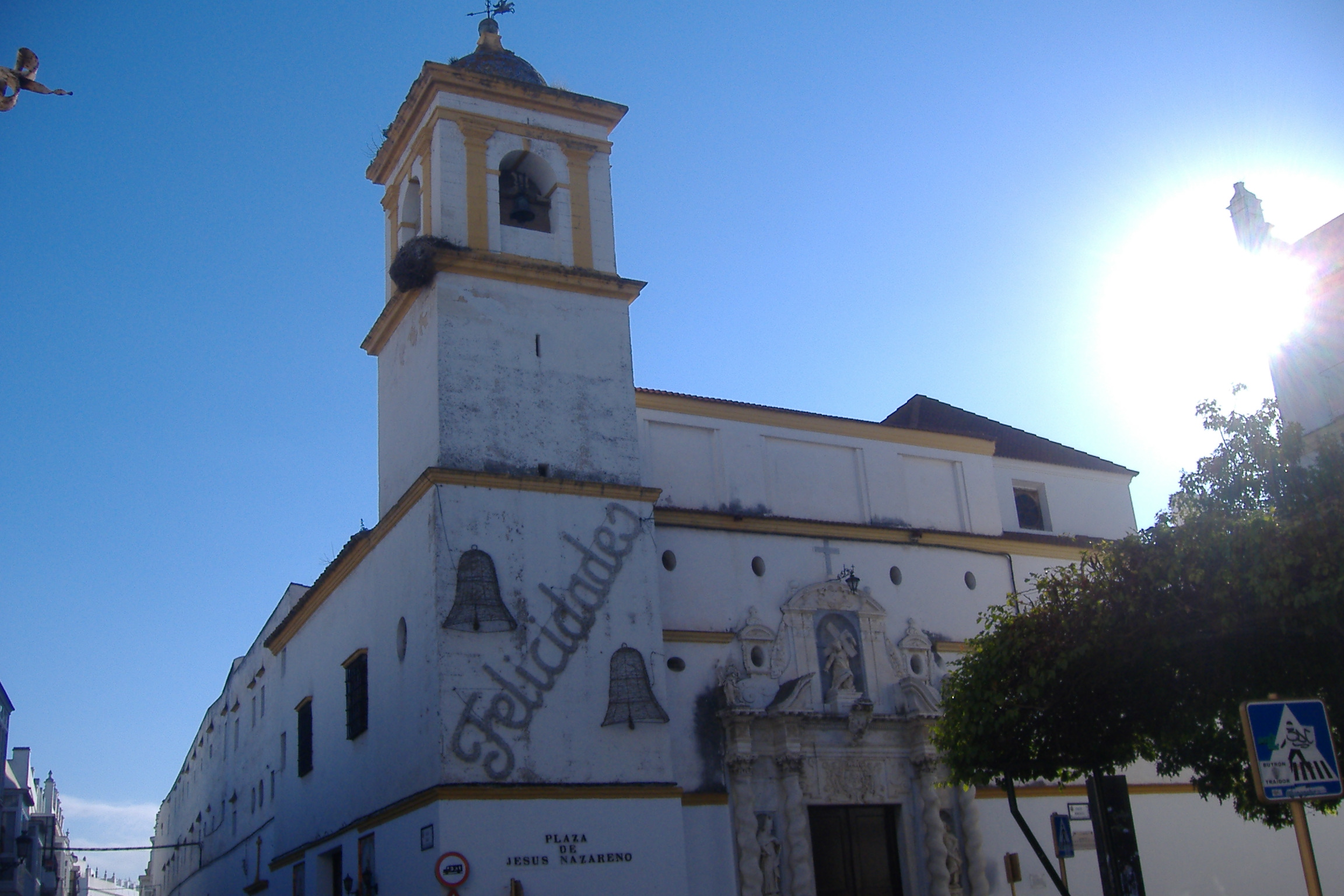
Convento de Jesús Nazareno.

The Capilla del Santo Cristo (Chapel of the Holy Christ), dating from the late 15th century, is the oldest religious building in the city. In it is situated the confraternity of the Vera Cruz, one of the oldest existing penitential brotherhoods in Andalusia. The current façade of the church is a result of the many restorations that the building has experienced. The chapel contains a huge atrium.

There are two religious buildings from the 16th century. The Iglesia de San Sebastián (36.420611°N 6.144232°W), which is located next to the bridge of Remedios. This church has undergone several renovations throughout its history. In the courtyard stands a monument to Antonio Cabrera, a speaker, scientist and botanist and son of the town. The Hospital de San Martín (36.419063°N 6.147276°W) is now part of the "Niño Jesús" college. Although it has undergone several reforms, this old building remained inside the Capilla del Sagrado Corazón, with several Baroque altarpieces. 17th century religious buildings include the Convento de Jesús Nazareno (36.418813°N 6.149395°W), a baroque church founded by Mother Antonia de Jesús in the year 1666; as well as the Iglesia de la Santísima Trinidad (San Telmo) (36.420962°N 6.148624°W) which has a high Baroque style altar and has a belfry with a unique angular design.

The 18th century Iglesia de San Juan Bautista (Iglesia Mayor) (36.418034°N 6.146211°W) is a neoclassical masterpiece. Designed by Torcuato Cayón, it was finished by his godson and pupil Torcuato Benjumeda. It is built over an earlier church, which retains one of its original chapels and a fine 16th-century Flemish altarpiece. It possesses carvings of great value and several paintings from the Zurbarán school. The church has been listed as a Cultural Monument since 1975. The Ermita de Santa Ana (36.414846°N 6.150965°W) was built by Cayón in 1771. It is a visual icon of the city and its highest point, offering a panorama for miles around. An octagonal chapel, it is surrounded by an octagonal arcaded portico. The building houses the icon of Santa Ana, carved by the Genoan Domingo Giscardi in the 18th century.

== Culture ==
=== Museums ===
The Museo de Chiclana is located in the Casa Briones near the Plaza Mayor. In different rooms, the public can learn about the prehistoric periods and antiquity of the city, its formation, the Battle of Chiclana and up to the present day. It has sections dedicated to the local wine industry, horticulture, salt industry and fishing. All of the displays are labelled and an audiovisual exhibition provides an overview of the history and traditions of Chiclana in an entertaining, accessible and understandable manner. In addition, the museum has several rooms where many interesting temporary exhibitions are mounted. The bullfighter Francisco de Paula Montes y Reina, better known as by his nickname, Paquiro, was born in Chiclana in 1805, and the Museo Municipal Taurino Francisco Montes is dedicated to him. On November 3, 2016, the new " Salt and Sherry Museum" opened opposite the market hall in a renovated bodega. Founded in 1928, the Marín Dolls Museum-Factory was a factory and museum which created and exhibited traditional Marín dolls, but it is now closed. Many of the dolls are now on permanent display in the Salt and Sherry Museum .

=== Festivals ===
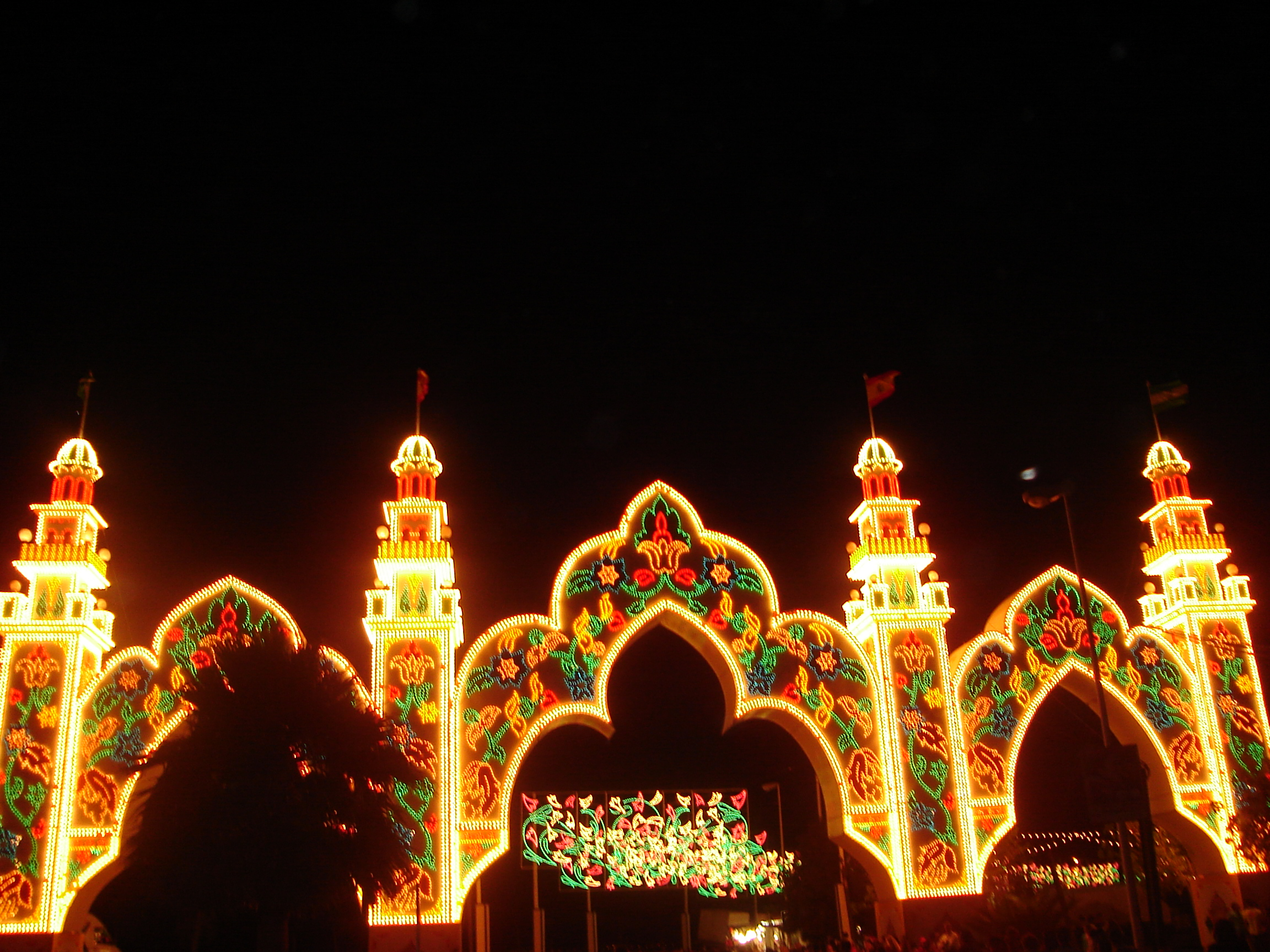
San Antonio Fair

Chiclana de la Frontera celebrates many festivals and feast days. Carnaval is held at the beginning of Lent the festival includes a parade and performances. The San Antonio Fair is held in mid June. There is a parade and dancing in the stands, and an opportunity for people to wear local costumes. The celebration of Corpus Christi includes streets decorated with rosemary, incense and floral altars; there is also a religious procession. The Festival of El Pilar celebrates the Virgen del Pilar, patron of the State Security Forces; the icon is located in the Church of San Juan Bautista. Las Cruces de Mayo Chiclaneras festival occurs in May with a procession. Typically, courtyards are decorated with flowers and religious symbols. The Festival of Parpuja occurs in August and consists of a gala attended by the leading national figures of flamenco such as José Mercé, Rancapino, and others. Traditional foods are accompanied by wines from Chiclana.

Feast days are celebrated as rites of the Catholic religion. These include the Feast of San Juan Bautista, held on 23–24 June, in which a procession is accompanied by brass bands in the Plaza Mayor. A typical dish at this time of year are snails. The Feast of Our Lady of Mount Carmel, held on July 16, venerates the Virgin del Carmen Barrosa, an icon of which is carried in the procession. The Feast of Santa Ana, held on July 26, includes a procession-pilgrimage featuring Santa Ana through the center of the city and the Santa Ana neighborhood. There are festivities around the shrine of this saint. A typical dish at this time are the sweets "Campanas de Santa Ana". The Feast of Our Lady of Remedies, held on September 8, includes a procession featuring the icon of the Virgen de los Remedios, patron saint of the city. Another tribute to the patron features horse riders competing in front of the Parish of the Holy Trinity (San Telmo). There is also a traditional pressing of the grapes, which symbolizes the beginning of the harvest. In recent years, this day also celebrates the Feast of Pescao of Estero, a fish tasting event at the Alameda del Rio. The Feast of All Saints Tosantos is celebrated on November 1.

== In fiction ==
- Cornwell, Bernard, Sharpe's Fury: Richard Sharpe and the Battle of Barrosa, March 1811, HarperCollins, 2006, ISBN 978-0-06-053048-8
- "The Girl at the Inn" (Spanish: La niña de la venta): a 1951 Spanish musical comedy film directed by Ramón Torrado and starring Lola Flores, Manolo Caracol and Manuel Requena that takes place in Cadiz. It was shot in the fishing village of Sancti Petri, in Chiclana de la Frontera.

== Notable people ==
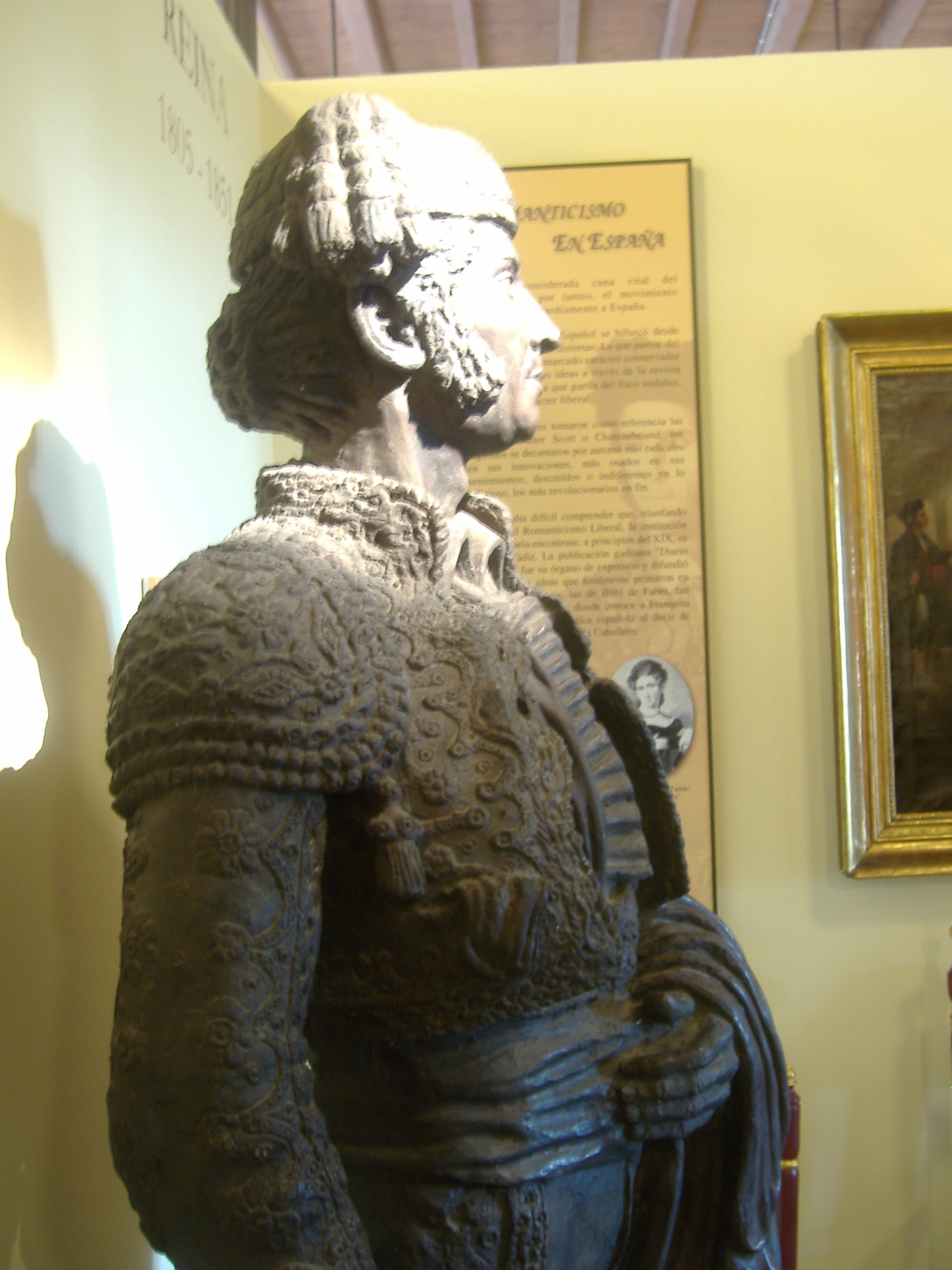
Detailed bronze of Francisco Montes Reina (Paquiro) by the sculptor Ignacio Falgueras Cano, 1978, Museo Taurino de Chiclana.

- Antonio Alemania, singer, songwriter
- Antonio García Gutiérrez, poet, playwright and librettist
- Sebastián Gessa y Arias (1840–1920), painter
- Fernando Quiñones, writer
- Enrique Montero Ruiz, musician
- Antonio Cabrera y Curro, priest, philosopher and botanist
- Juan Álvarez Mendizábal, Minister of Finance and former Prime Minister
- Enrique de las Morenas y Fossi, Captain of "Los Últimos de Filipinas" during the Spanish War of Independence
- José Marín Verdugo, artist and entrepreneur
- La Prohibida
- José Moreno, actor
- Pepa Rus, actress
- El Granaíno (Juan José Jiménez Ramos)
- Rancapino, singer
- José Manuel Moreno (cyclist), cyclist, Olympic champion in 1992
- José Antonio Butrón, Motocross champion
- Jesús Ruiz "Jesuli", volleyball player and Mediterranean Games gold medalist
- Manuel Muñoz Ramírez, footballer known as Manolito
- Fernando Casas, physician of King Fernando VII
- Francisco Montes Reina, bullfighter

== Twin towns ==
Chiclana de la Frontera is twinned with:

- El Astillero, Spain
- Béziers, France

== See also ==
- List of municipalities in Cádiz
