= Bisse (surname) =

Bisse is a surname. Notable people with the surname include:

- James Bisse (c. 1552–1607), English politician
- Johannes Bisse (1935–1984), Cuban botanist
- Kevin Bisse (born 1995), Swedish footballer
- Philip Bisse (1667–1721), English bishop

== See also ==
- Bisse (disambiguation)
- Biss (surname)
- Risse
