= Novo Sancti Petri =

- Resort town
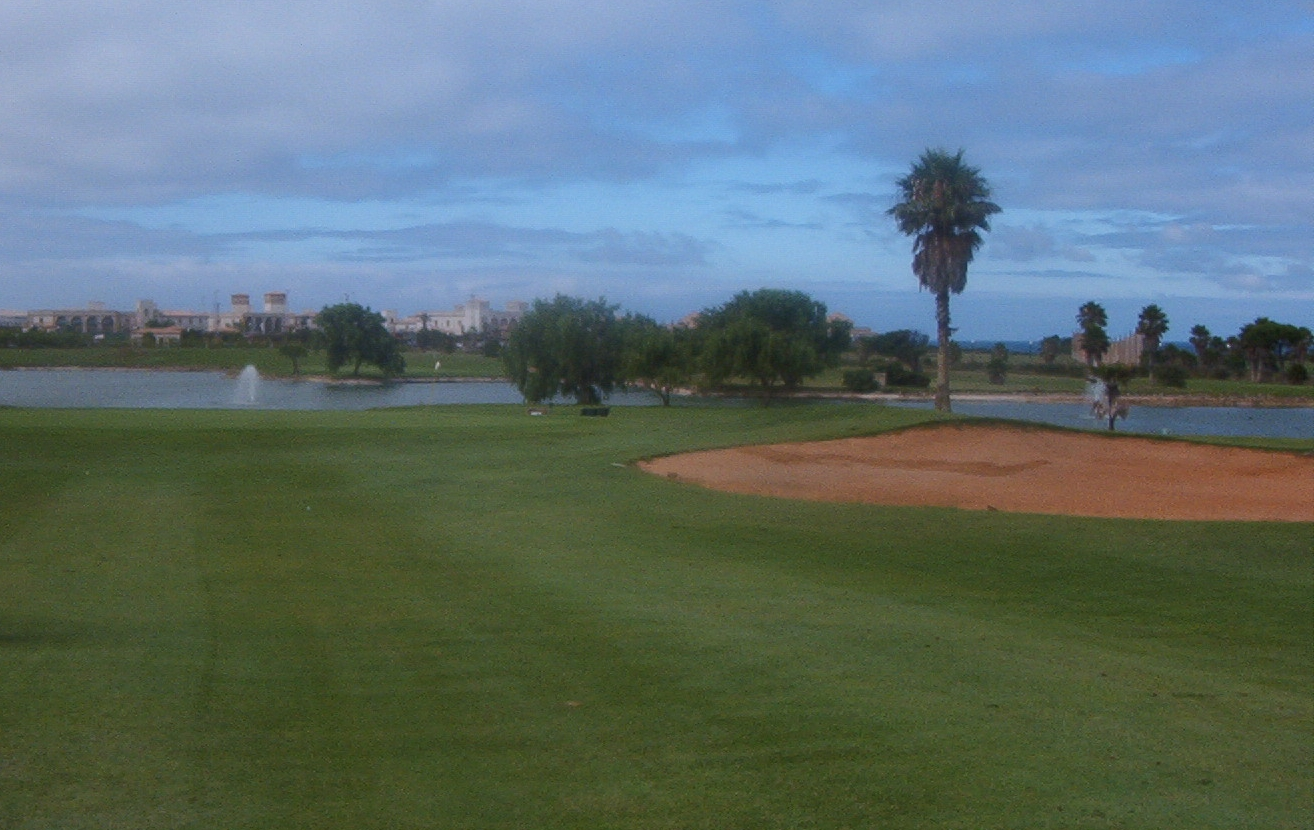

- Flag Coat of arms

- Location in Andalusia Novo Sancti Petri (Andalusia) Novo Sancti Petri (Spain)
- Coordinates: 36°20′48″N 6°9′56″W
- Country: Spain
- Autonomous community: Andalusia
- Province: Cádiz
- Comarca: Bay of Cádiz
- Commonwealth: Municipios de la Bahía de Cádiz
- Municipality: Chiclana de la Frontera

Government
  - Mayor: José María Román (PSOE)
- Time zone: UTC+1 (CET)
  - Summer (DST): UTC+2 (CEST)
- Postal code: 11130
- Dialing code: 956

Novo Sancti Petri is a resort town in the municipality of Chiclana de la Frontera in the province of Cádiz, Andalusia, southwestern Spain. It lies along the Playa de la Barrosa to the south of the main town of Chiclana. It is known for its high number of golf courses and hotels, covering an area of about 4000 hectares. The municipality contains the largest number of hotel beds in the province of Cadiz and the Costa de la Luz and has about 20 luxury hotels which are 4 or 5 star. Notable golf courses include the 36-hole Club de Golf Novo Sancti Petri, the 18-hole Club de Golf Melia Sancti Petri, the 9-hole Club de Golf Campano, European Golfes Academy, Escuela de golf Practeegolf and Campo de golf Lomas de Sancti Petri. It also includes the Barceló Sancti Petri Spa Resort.

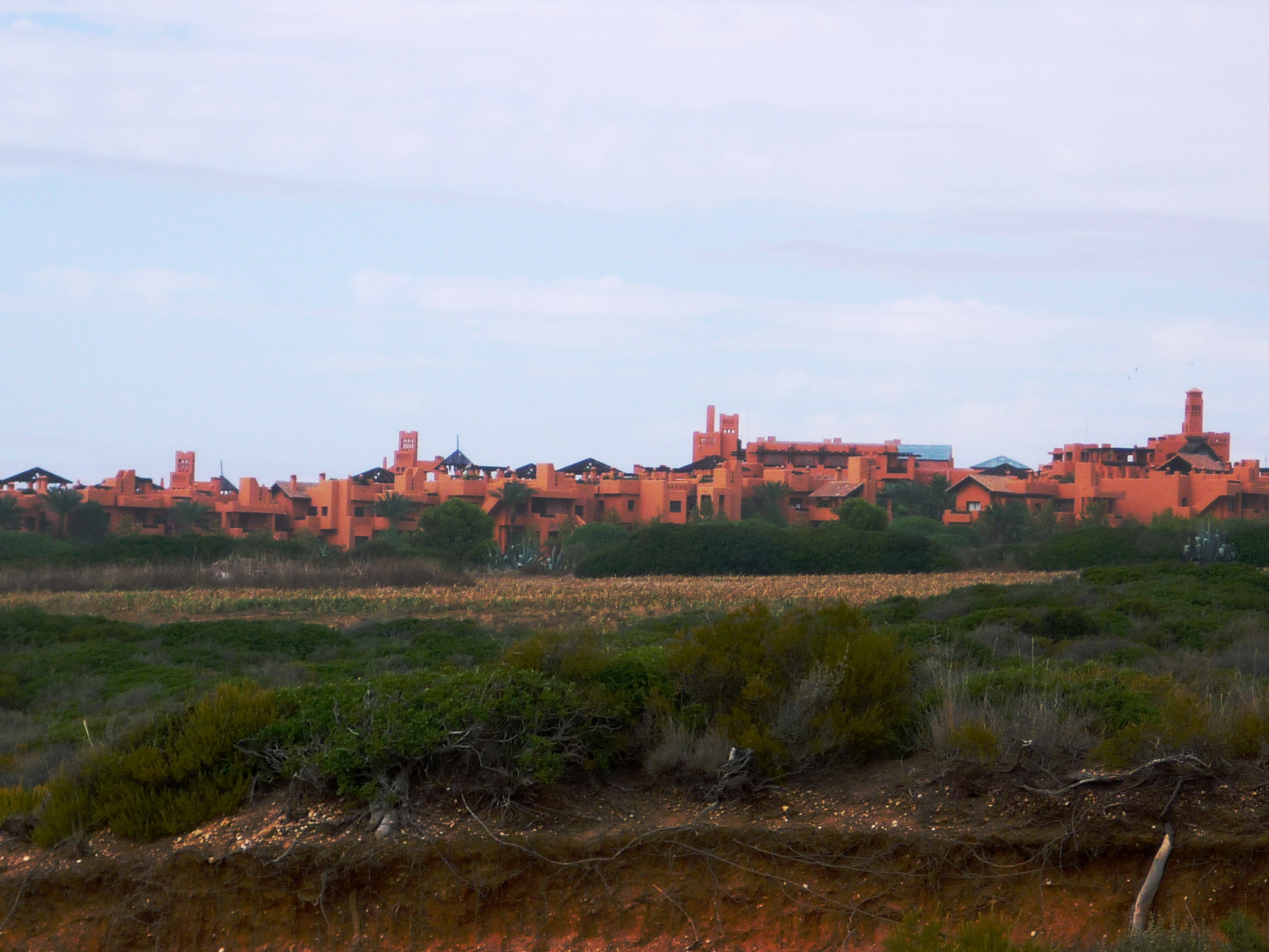
Novo Sancti Petri

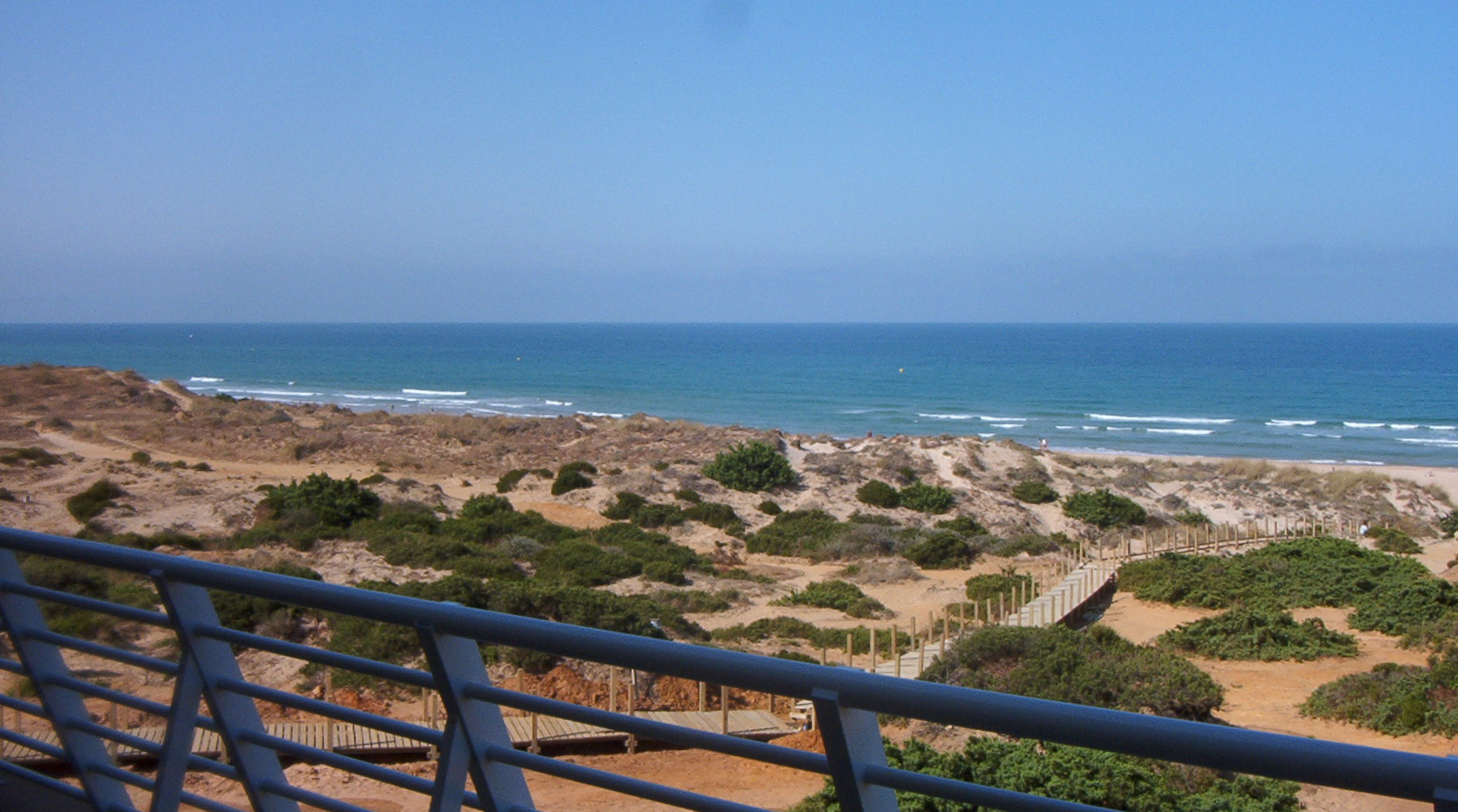
Coastline
