= Bay of Cadiz =

Bay of Cadiz may refer to:

- Bay of Cádiz, a body of water off the province of Cadiz, Spain
- Bay of Cádiz (comarca), a comarca (county) in the province of Cadiz, Spain
- Gulf of Cádiz, the arm of the Atlantic Ocean stretching from the waters south of Portugal
