= Ermita de Santa Ana =

Chapel in Chiclana de la Frontera, Spain

Coordinates: 36.414°N 6.150°W

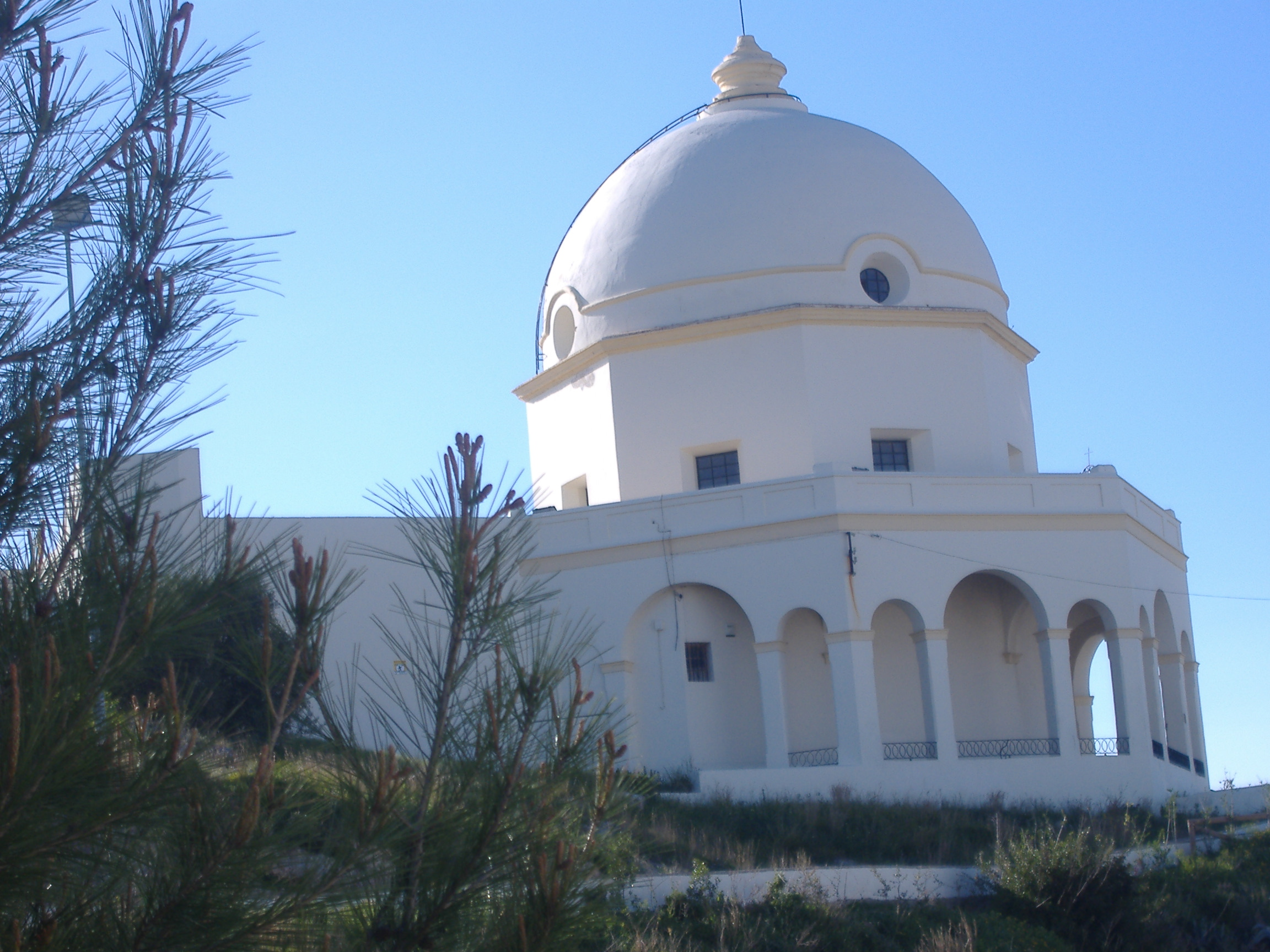
Ermita de Santa Ana

The Ermita de Santa Ana (lit. 'chapel of Santa Ana') is a chapel in Chiclana de la Frontera, in the province of Cádiz, Andalusia, southwestern Spain. It is situated on the highest part of the city on the hill of the same name. It was designed by the Cádiz architect Torcuato Cayón de la Vega at the initiative of the brothers Francisco de Paula and José Manjón. After gaining permission from the military as the site was a strategic vantage point, construction occurred between 1772 and 1774. The a porch is a polygon shape with three semicircular holes on pilasters. It is covered with a hemispherical dome with four circular holes to the interior which light the chapel. The entryway opens to the main town of Chiclana and Bay of Cádiz. It has Byzantine, Mozarabic, and Neoclassical features. Inside, it houses a small shrine. A sculpture representing Saint Anne with the Virgin sits within a niche, the work of the Genoese sculptor, Domingo Giscardi, who was based in Cadiz. The chapel is open to the public every Tuesday and July 26, the feast day of Santa Ana.
