= Bisse =

Bisse may refer to:

- Bisse, Hungary, a village in Baranya county
- Bisse (canal), a small wooden canal or channel used in traditional irrigation systems of European alpine regions, including in Valais, Switzerland
- Bisse (singer), Danish musician who performed at the 2017 NorthSide Festival in Denmark

== See also ==
- Bisse (surname)
- Biss (disambiguation)
