= Rancapino =

Spanish Romani flamenco singer (born 1945)

Rancapino (born Alonso Núñez Núñez, in 1945) is a Spanish Romani flamenco singer.

Born in Chiclana de la Frontera in 1945, he was grandson of "La Obispa" and son of "Manuel Orillito". He is brother of another flamenco singer "Orillo del Puerto". His stage name "Rancapino" arose from his childhood. He was always running naked from side to side and his gipsy neighbour “El Mono” used to call him “Rancapino” because he looked like a burning pine.

Rancapino began as a singer during his childhood, acting at family and neighborhood parties. Friend and mate of Camaron de la Isla from his childhood they sang together in taverns and tablaos of the Bay of Cadiz, as the "Venta de Vargas" in San Fernando. He won the Premio de Mairena del Alcor and the Concurso Nacional de Córdoba in 1977. He performed in Madrid and went on a tour of France and Japan and performed at numerous festivals. He is noted for his characteristic deep hoarse voice, which makes him one of the greatest exponents of the "Cante Jondo". He has been cited as one of the best singers from the Province of Cadiz.
