= Marín Dolls Museum-Factory =

Museum in Spain

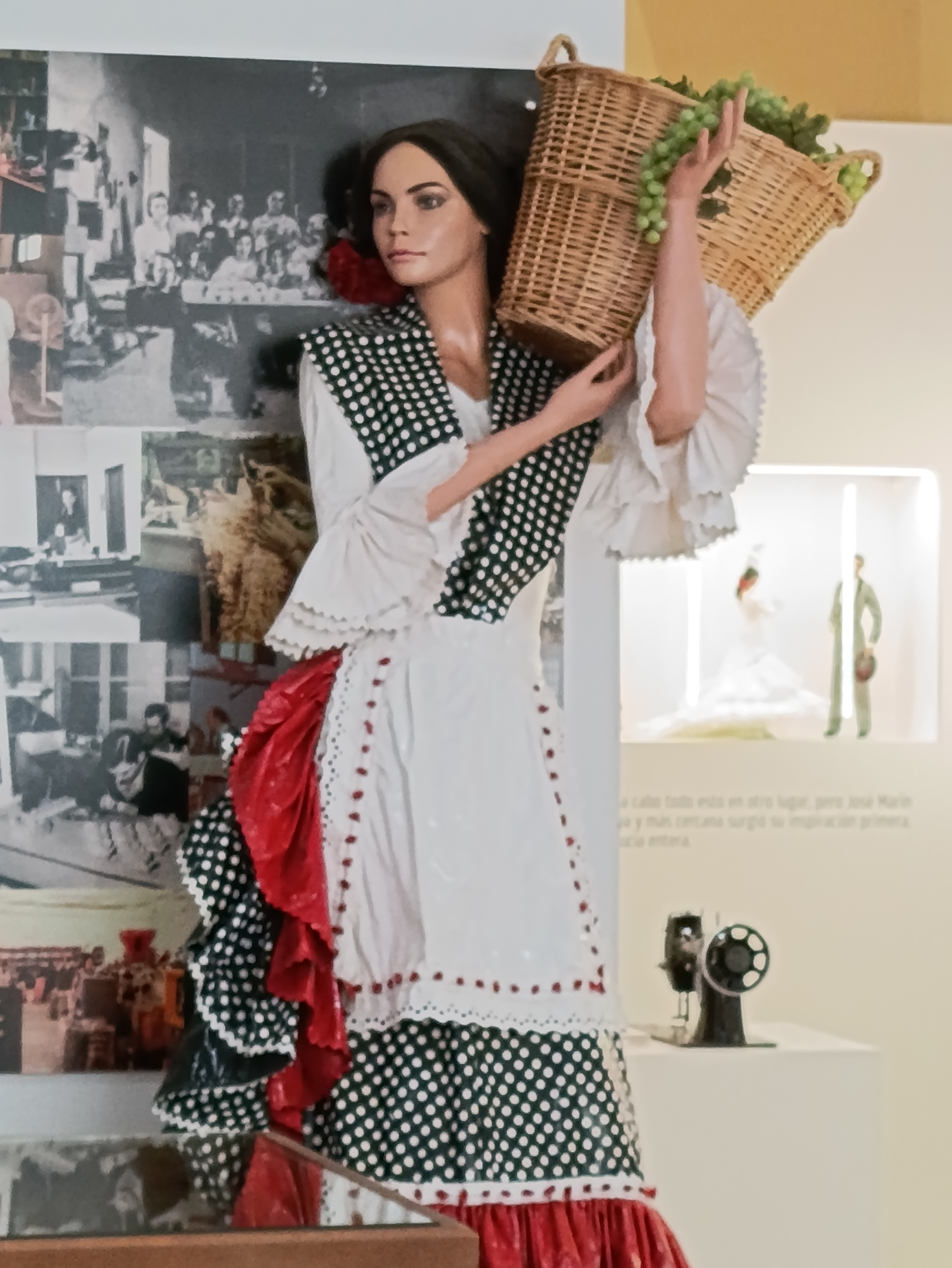
- Location: Chiclana de la Frontera, Spain
- Type: factory toy museum
- Website: Official website

The Marín Dolls Museum-Factory (Fábrica-Museo Muñecas Marín) was located in Chiclana de la Frontera, in the province of Cádiz, Andalusia, southwestern Spain. The doll museum was located within the doll factory. The factory was established in 1928, by José Marín Verdugo (1903-1984). By the mid 20th century, the dolls were being sold not only in Spain, but also in other European countries. In 1976, the Spanish government granted the Medal of Merit of Labor to José Marín Verdugo's factory. Kraków in Poland honored it with the First World Dollmaking Award. Following José Maria's death it was run by Ana Marín, daughter of the founder and Ernesto, his son until its closure in 2014.

== Museum ==
The museum provided information on the factory building and its traditional Marín dolls, which had been awarded the first prize in World Doll-Making. Opened in 1997, the museum's goal was to showcase the various types of doll created by the factory. It had a large collection of handmade dolls, moulds, antique designs and original models. The museum closed when the factory was demolished. In 1999 an agreement was signed with the town hall concerning the collection, leading in 2022 to the opening of a permanent exhibition in the centre of town.

== Factory ==
Doll making gave work to thousands of women and children on a piece work basis, using artisanal methods to assemble the dolls at home. Originally, the dolls were dressed in typical Andalusian flamenco attire, but later others were produced to depict costumes from other regions and countries. From the beginning, it demonstrated traditional doll making techniques, such as clothing, hair, accessories and facial expressions. Unable to compete with a changing marketplace and China, the factory closed and was demolished in. It was a reference point for the local economy and its closure was a great loss felt by many.
