= Biss (surname) =

Biss is a surname. Notable people with the surname include:

- Hubert E. J. Biss (1871–1909), British physician and medical writer
- Edwin Gerald Jones Biss (1876–1922), English motoring journalist and author
- Stan Biss (1892–1952), English greyhound trainer
- Józef Biss (1913–1977), Polish war criminal
- Harry Biss (1919–1997), American jazz pianist
- Earl Biss (1947–1998), Apsáalooke painter
- Daniel Biss (born 1977), American mathematician and politician
- Eula Biss (born 1977), American non-fiction writer
- Jonathan Biss (born 1980), American pianist
- Emma Biss (born 1990), Australian cricketer
- Tom Biss (born 1993), New Zealand footballer
- Benjamin Biss, musician

== See also ==
- Bisse (surname)
