= Francisco Montes Reina =

Spanish bullfighter (1805–1851)

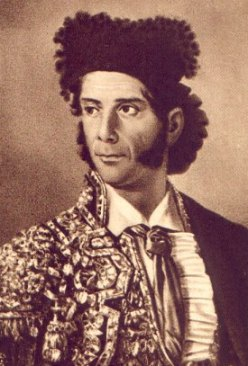
- Born: Francisco Montes Reina; 13 January 1804
- Died: 4 April 1851 (aged 47)

Francisco Montes Reina (January 13, 1804 – April 4, 1851), nicknamed Paquiro, was a matador and celebrity. He was born in Chiclana de la Frontera, Cádiz Province, Spain.

Intending to become a surgeon, Reina abandoned the plan after losing the sponsorship of a marquis left his father in financial difficulty. Forsaking the family business (masonry), Reina took up bullfighting.

Reina remains one of the most famous names in bullfighting history, having codified rules for bullfighting and contriving an order for fights. He also introduced the "Traje de Luz" - the suit that the bullfighters wear to this day.

Circa 1840 in Madrid, Reina was paid 6,000 Spanish reals for killing five bulls. Two years later, he earned 2,000 per bull. Until retirement in 1848, he was by far the most important bullfighter in Spain. He attempted to return to the ring after retirement, but could not attain his former grandeur. His last fight was with the bull "Rumbón", July 21, 1850, in Madrid. He died at age forty-seven in his hometown.

There is a museum dedicated to him in his home town of Chiclana de la Frontera, in Cádiz province.
