= Torre Bermeja (Albéniz) =

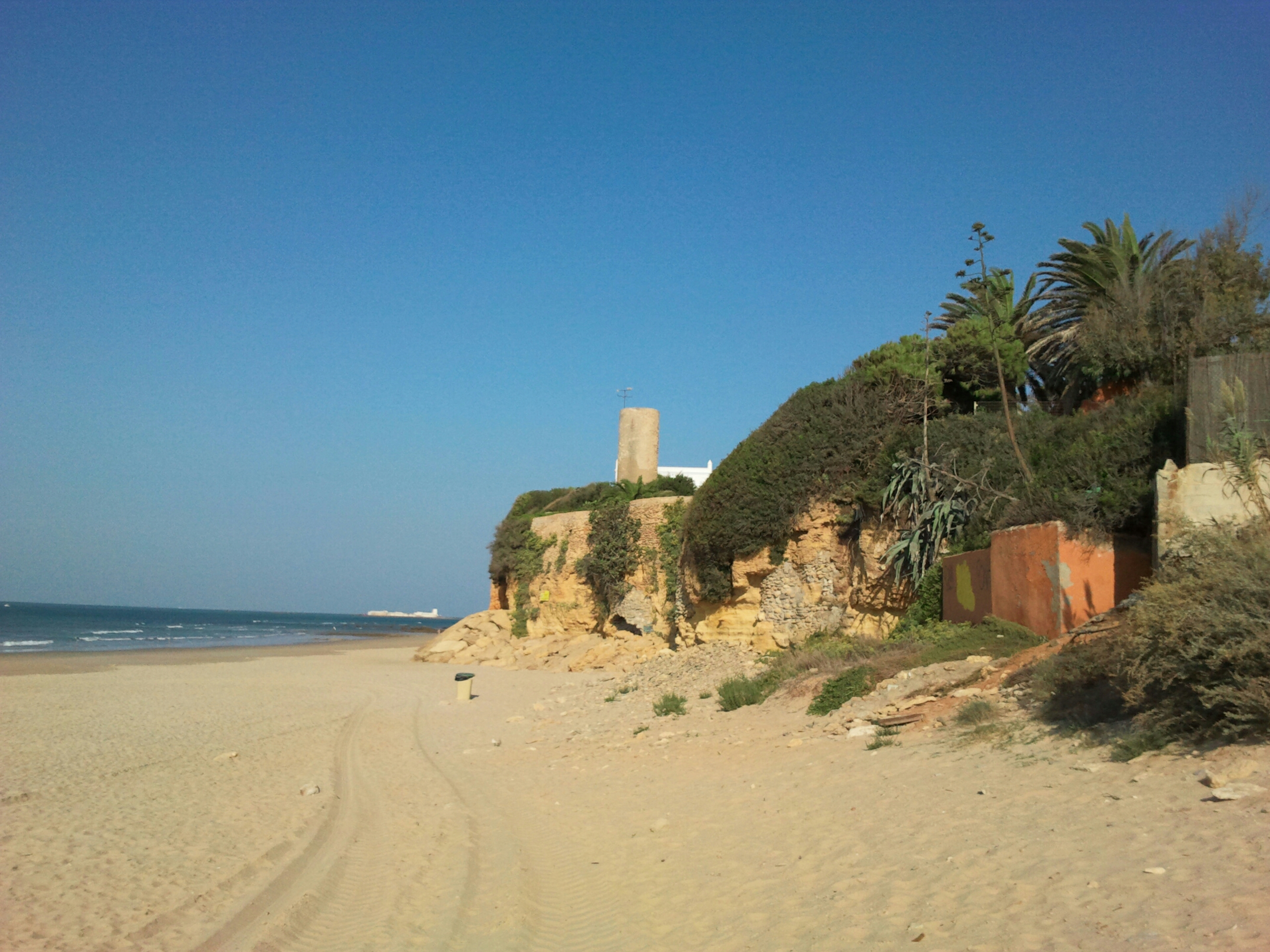
Torre Bermeja

Torre Bermeja is a musical work by the Spanish composer Isaac Albéniz. It was published in a set of piano pieces, his 12 Piezas características, Op.92. The title means "vermilion tower". There are towers of this name at the Alhambra, but Albeniz's piece is believed to be named after the Torre Bermeja, a defensive structure on the Playa de la Barrosa in the Province of Cadiz.

Originally written for piano, since it has been transcribed for classical guitar by Miguel Llobet it has become an important work for classical guitar. It has been played and recorded by guitarists such as Andrés Segovia, Julian Bream, John Williams and many others. The piece is most distinctive for its rapid D Major and A7 arpeggios at the beginning before going into the key of D minor. Records in Review said about the piece, "The Albeniz Torre bermeja, a piano work nowadays heard more frequently on the guitar, makes much of pizzicato, chordal runs, quick arpeggio passages, and harmonics.
