= Mathias Rissi =

Swiss New Testament scholar (1920–2006)

Mathias Rissi (1920–2006) was a Swiss New Testament scholar and teacher, the Walter H. Robertson Professor of New Testament at Union Theological Seminary, Richmond. He was a specialist in the Book of Revelation and the Gospel of John.

== Life ==
He was born in Wienacht, Appenzell, Switzerland, on September 29, 1920, and grew up in his native land. His university studies were at Zurich and at Basel under professors Karl Barth, Oscar Cullmann, Eduard Thurneysen, and Emil Brunner. Under Karl Barth he received his doctorate in 1951.

When Rissi joined the faculty of the Union Theological Seminary in Richmond in 1963, he brought wide pastoral experience gained through work in five parishes of the Reformed Church of Switzerland. He also had substantial experience as a teacher; for nine years he had been a lecturer at the Theological Faculty of the University of Basel under his mentor Karl Barth. In 1966, three years after joining the faculty in Richmond, Va, Rissi was elected Walter H. Robertson Professor of New Testament.

Though his responsibilities have ranged more widely, his teaching, research, and writing have focused especially on the Johannine literature. In the 1970s and 80s, Rissi and his wife Veronica Rissi Truedinger both taught ecumenical summer courses at the University of Vienna, Austria. Her area of expertise included the art and history of the region. Rissi retired after 24 years on the faculty in 1987 and moved with his wife to Stonington, Maine where he continued to publish books and articles. He died in Charlotte, North Carolina, on 1 March 2006.

== Bibliography ==
- 1952 Zeit und Geschichte in der Offenbarung des Johannes (Zwingli Verlag, 1952); 6 editions published in 1952 in German and held by 116 WorldCat libraries
  - translated as Time and history: a study on the Revelation (John Knox Press, 1966); 19 editions published between 1965 and 1966 in German and English and held by 434 WorldCat libraries
- 1952 Die Zeit- und Geschichtsauffassung der Johannesapokalypse (Zwingli Verlag, 1952);7 editions published between 1950 and 1952 in German and held by 13 WorldCat libraries
- 1962 Die Taufe für die Toten : ein Beitrag zur paulinischen Tauflehre (Zwingli Verlag, 1962); 12 editions published between 1962 and 1969 in German and held by 165 WorldCat libraries 1
- 1965 Was ist und was geschehen soll danach: Die Zeit-und Geschichtsauffassung der Offenbarung des Johannes (Zwingli Verlag, 1965)
- 1966 Alpha und Omega; eine Deutung der Johannesoffenbarung (Friedrich Reinhardt Verlag, Berlin, 1966);6 editions published in 1966 in German and held by 70 WorldCat libraries
- 1969 Studien zum zweiten Korintherbrief : Der alte Bund, Der Prediger, Der Tod (Zwingli Verlag, 1969);12 editions published in 1969 in German and held by 184 WorldCat libraries
- 1972 The future of the world : an exegetical study of Revelation (Study in Biblical Theology, 2/22/72, pages 19.11–22.15, SCM Press, London, 1972); 29 editions published between 1966 and 1972 in English and German and held by 559 WorldCat libraries
- 1987 Die Theologie des Hebräerbriefs : ihre Verankerung in der Situation des Verfassers und seiner Leser (Mohr Siebeck Verlag, 1987); 9 editions published in 1987 in German and held by 190 WorldCat member libraries worldwide
- 1995 Die Hure Babylon und die Verführung der Heiligen : eine Studie zur Apokalypse des Johannes (Kohlhammer Verlag, 1995); 8 editions published between 1995 and 2011 in German and held by 151 WorldCat member libraries worldwide
