= Riss (surname) =

Riss is a surname, and may refer to:

- Dan Riss (1910–1970), American actor
- Erik Riss (born 1995), German speedway and grasstrack rider, son of Gerd and brother of Mark Riss
- Gerd Riss (born 1965), German former motorcycle speedway rider, father of Erik and Mark Riss
- Hermine Riss (1903–1980), Austrian honored as Righteous among the Nations for saving Jews from the Holocaust
- Juan Carlos Riss (born 1955), Bolivian politician and economist
- Mark Riss (born 1994), German speedway racer, son of Gerd and brother of Erik Riss

== See also ==
- Risse, surname
