= Playa de la Barrosa =

Beach in Spain

Coordinates: 36°22′07″N 6°10′55″W

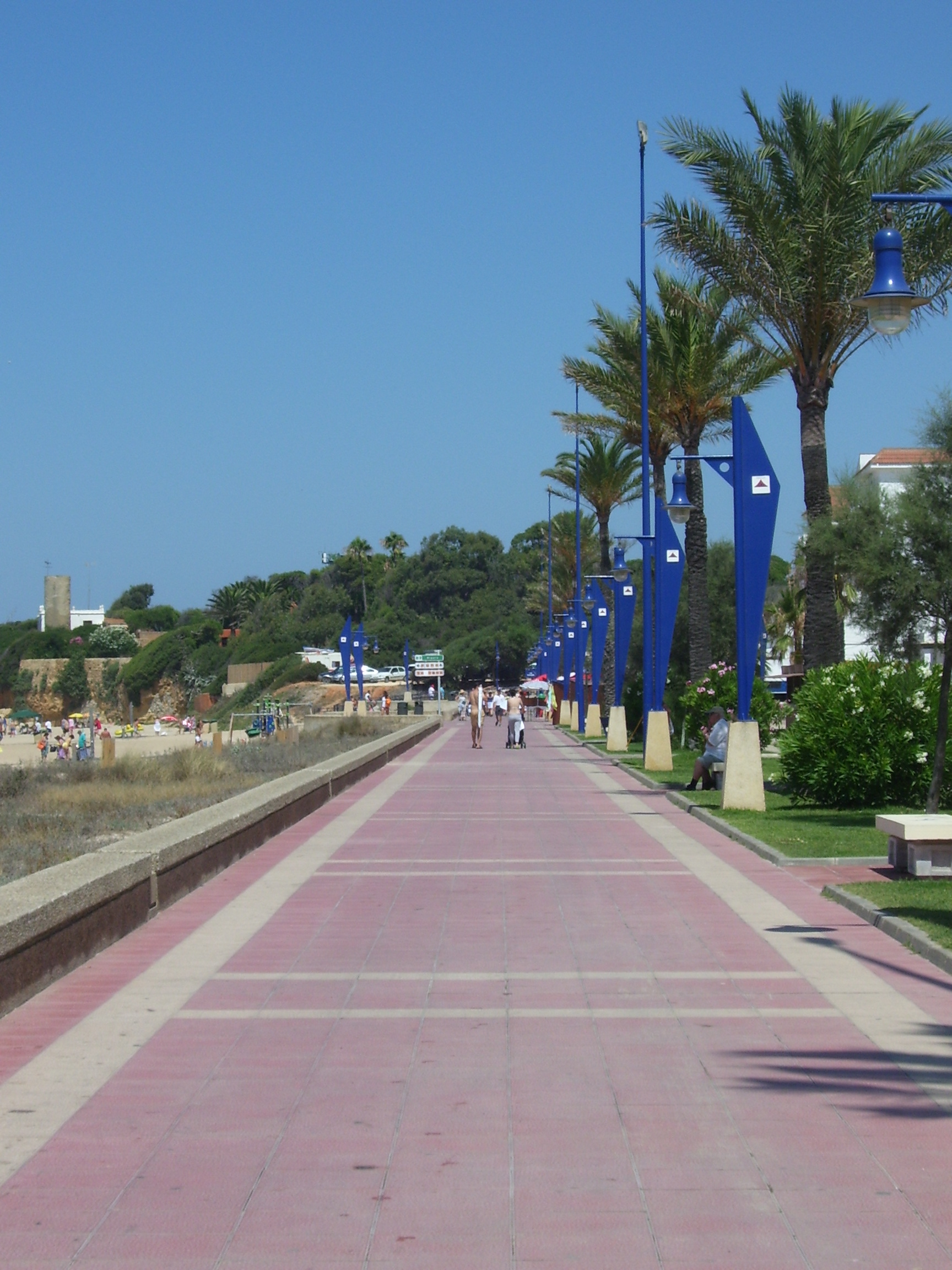

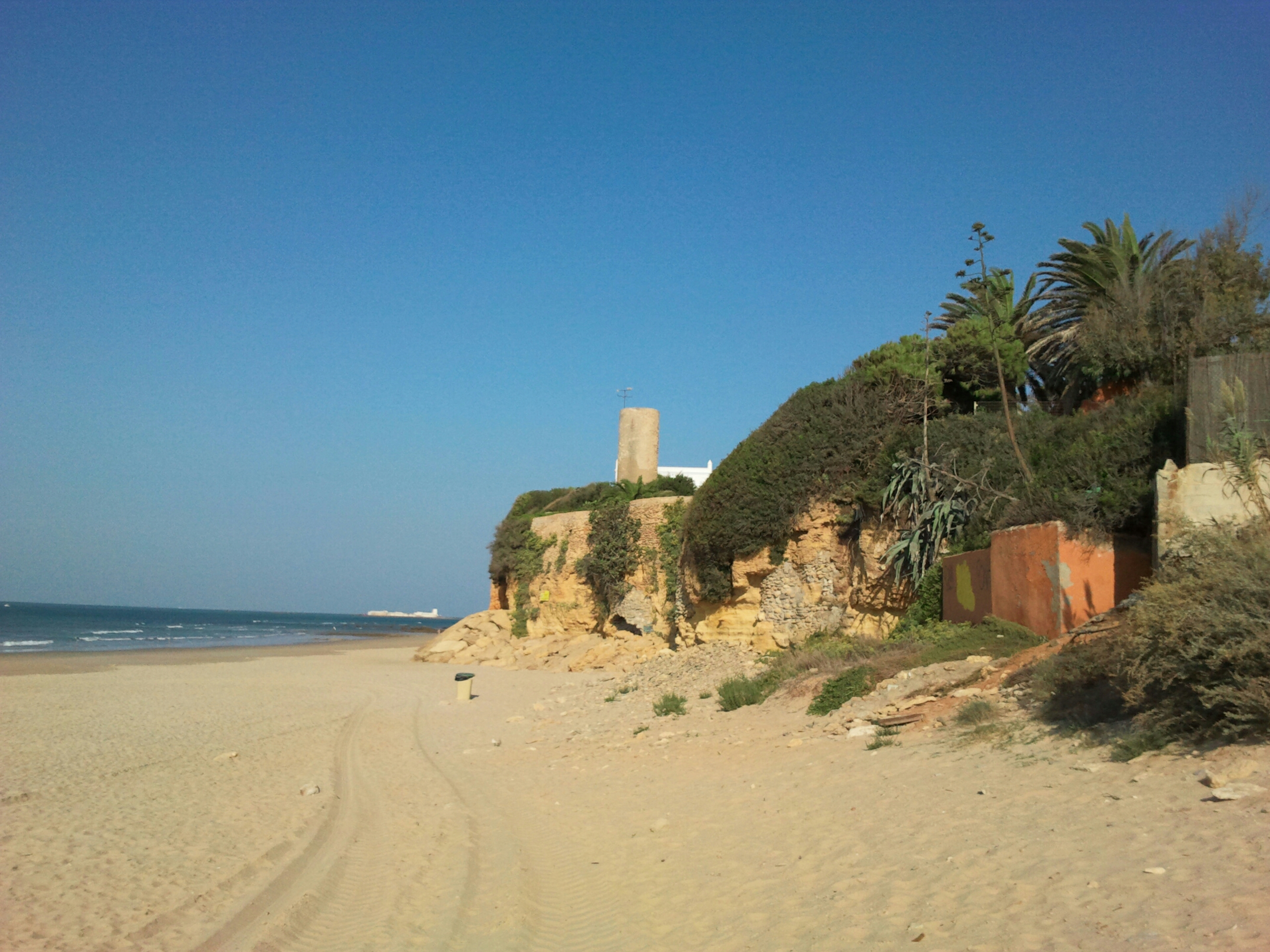
Torre Bermeja

Playa de la Barrosa is an 6-kilometre-long (3.7 mi) beach in the municipality of Chiclana de la Frontera, Province of Cádiz, Spain. It was the site of the Battle of Barrosa in 1811. It is separated from the Playa de Sancti Petri by cliffs. At the north end of the Barrosa beach is a tower called Torre Bermeja. The resort of Novo Sancti Petri lies at the south end of Playa de la Barrosa and contains a defensive tower structure called Torre del Puerco. Several pieces of music have been composed about the beach, including Isaac Albéniz's Torre Bermeja and Paco de Lucía's "La Barrosa".

== History ==
The Battle of Chiclana and La Barrosa is said to have occurred on the Playa de la Barrosa, marking an important milestone in the Spanish War of Independence.
