= Bay of Cádiz (comarca) =

Coordinates: 36.5271°N 6.2886°W

Bay of Cádiz Comarca de la Bahía de Cádiz
- Comarca
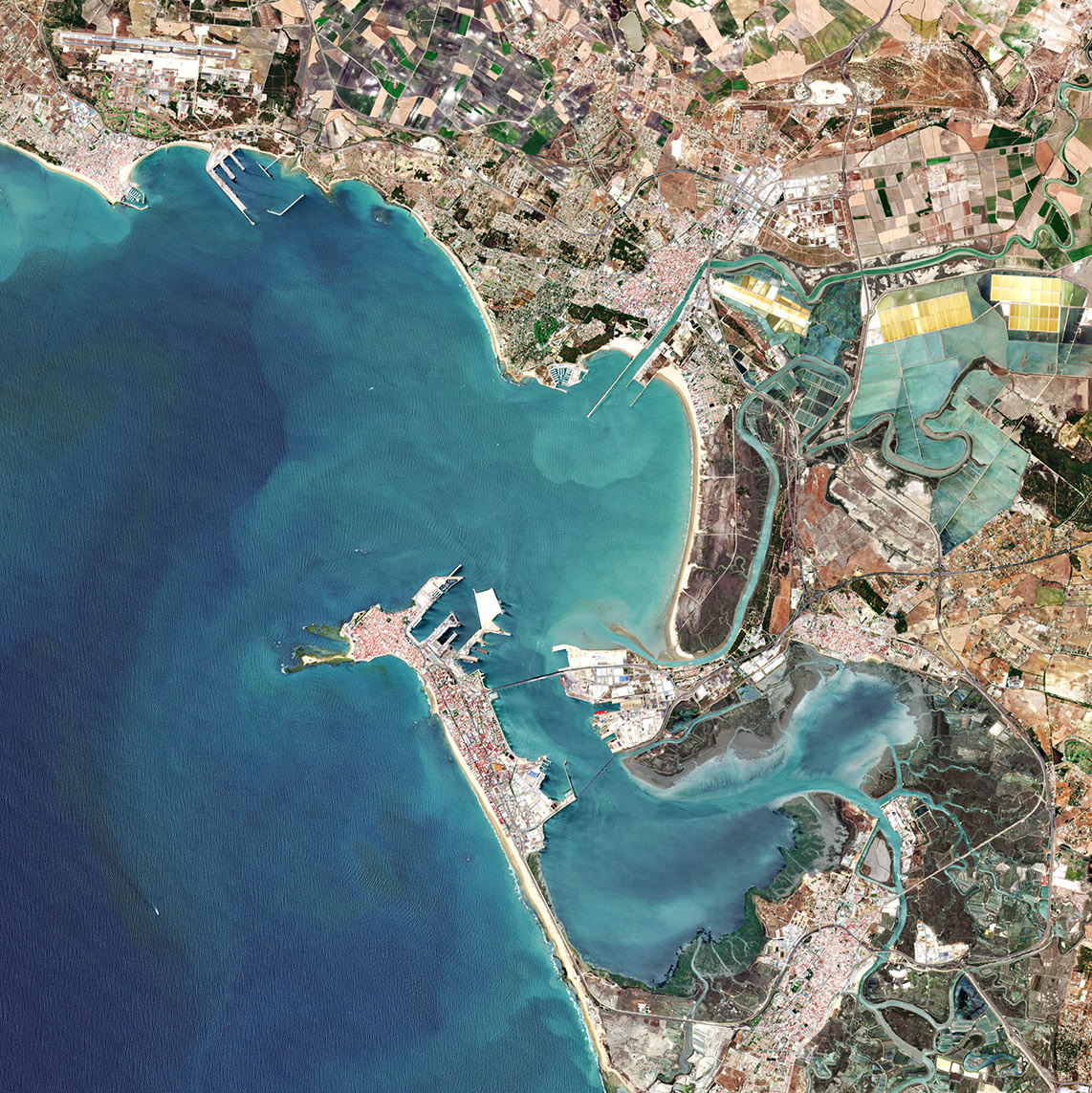
- Satellite view of the Bay of Cádiz, taken by Sentinel-2 of Copernicus Programme.

- Location of Bay of Cádiz in Andalusia, Spain

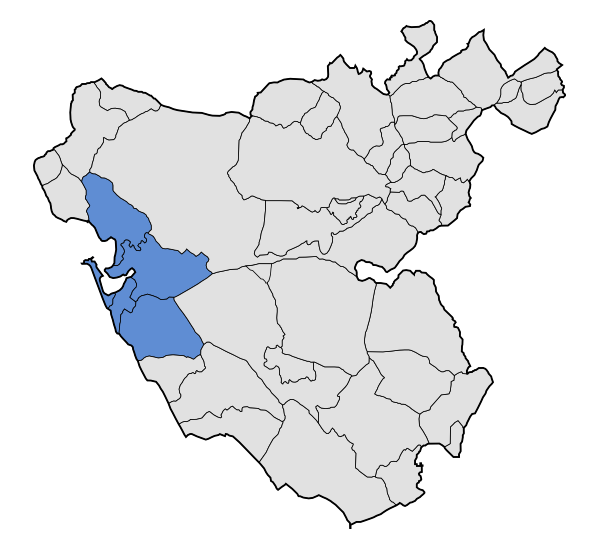
- Location of Bay of Cádiz in the province of Cádiz
- Country: Spain
- Autonomous community: Andalusia
- Province: Cádiz
- Capital: Cádiz
- Municipalities: List: Cádiz, Chiclana de la Frontera, El Puerto de Santa María, Puerto Real, San Fernando

Area
  - Total: 603.7 km^{2} (233.1 sq mi)

Population (2023) (Note: Census at 1 January 2023: Instituto Nacional de Estadística, Madrid.)
  - Total: 426,329
  - Density: 13,369.9/km^{2} (34,628/sq mi)
- Time zone: UTC+1 (CET)
  - Summer (DST): UTC+2 (CEST)
- Largest municipality: Cádiz

The Bay of Cádiz (Spanish: Comarca de la Bahía de Cádiz) is one of the six comarcas (county, but with no administrative role) in the province of Cádiz, Andalusia, southern Spain.

The present-day comarca was established in 2003 by the Government of Andalusia.

== Municipalities ==
The Bahia de Cádiz comarca includes five municipalities:

Arms	Municipality	Area (km^{2})	Population 2023 (Note: Census at 1 January 2023: Instituto Nacional de Estadística, Madrid.)	Density(/km^{2})
	Cádiz	12.3	111,811	9,090.3
	Chiclana de la Frontera	205.5	88,709	431.7
	El Puerto de Santa María	159.3	89,813	563.8
	Puerto Real	196.0	42,069	214.6
	San Fernando	30.6	93,927	3,069.5
	Total	603.7	426,329	13,369.9

== Gallery ==
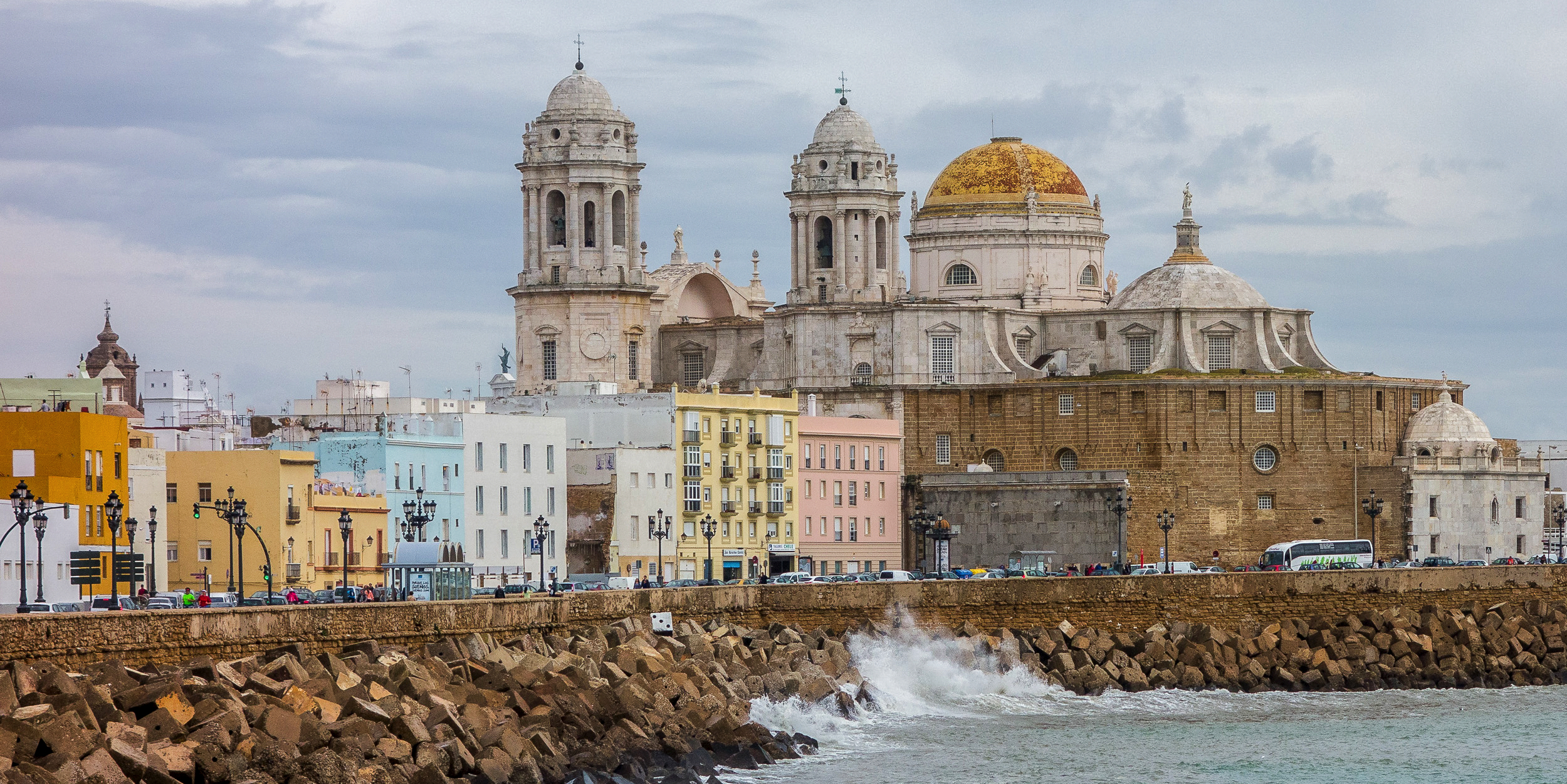
Cádiz Cathedral

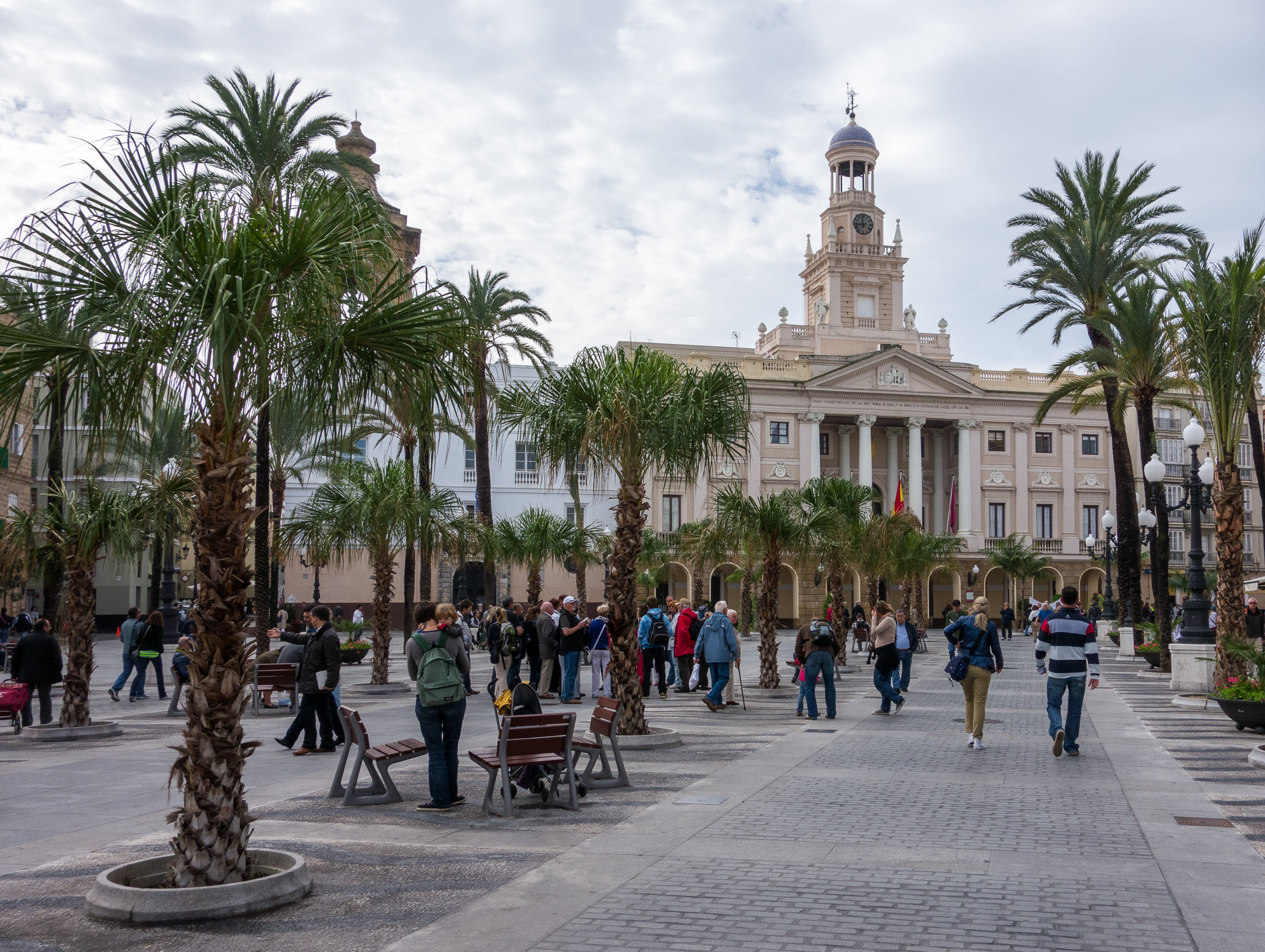
Cádiz Old Town Hall

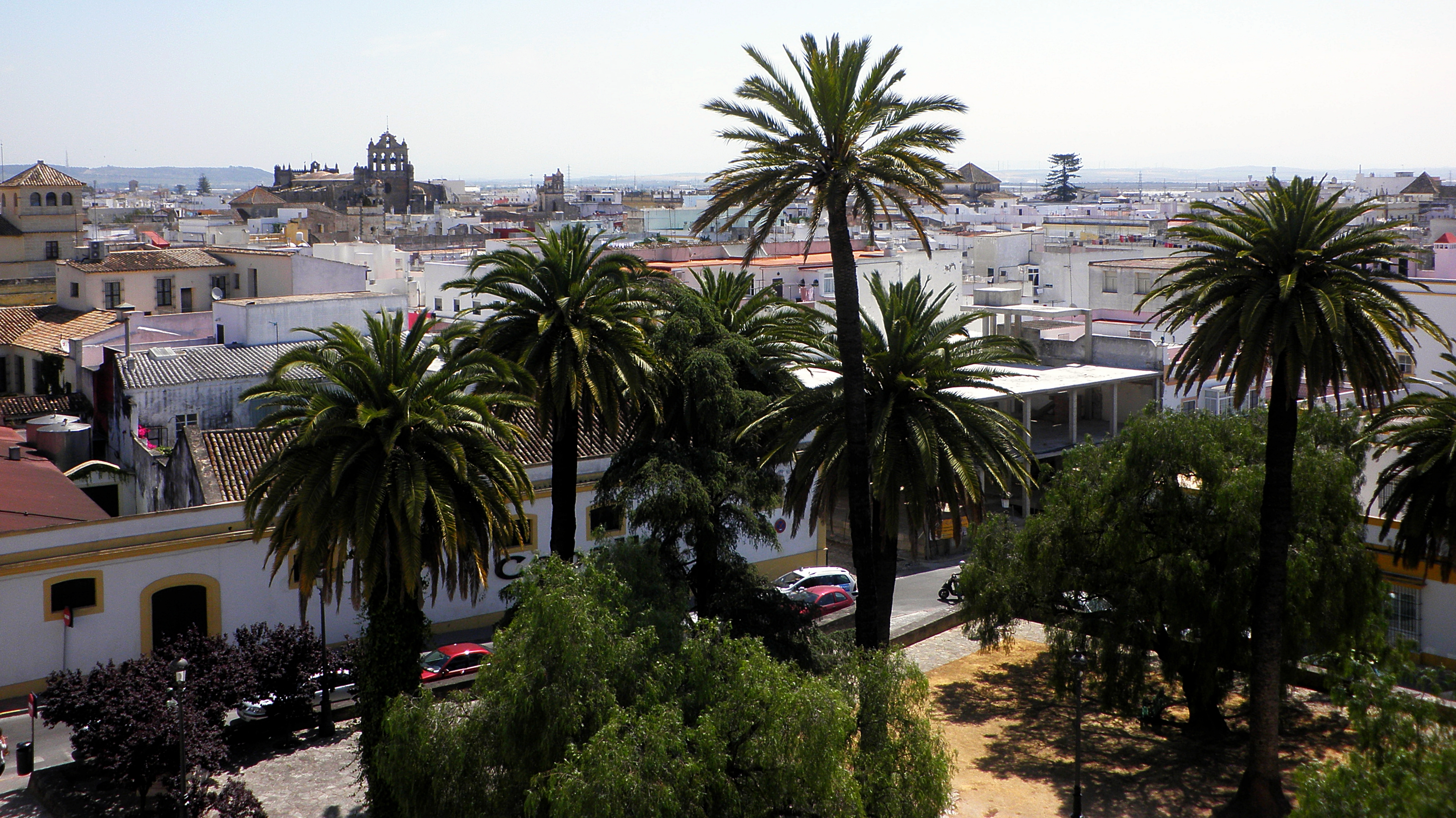
Puerto de Santa María

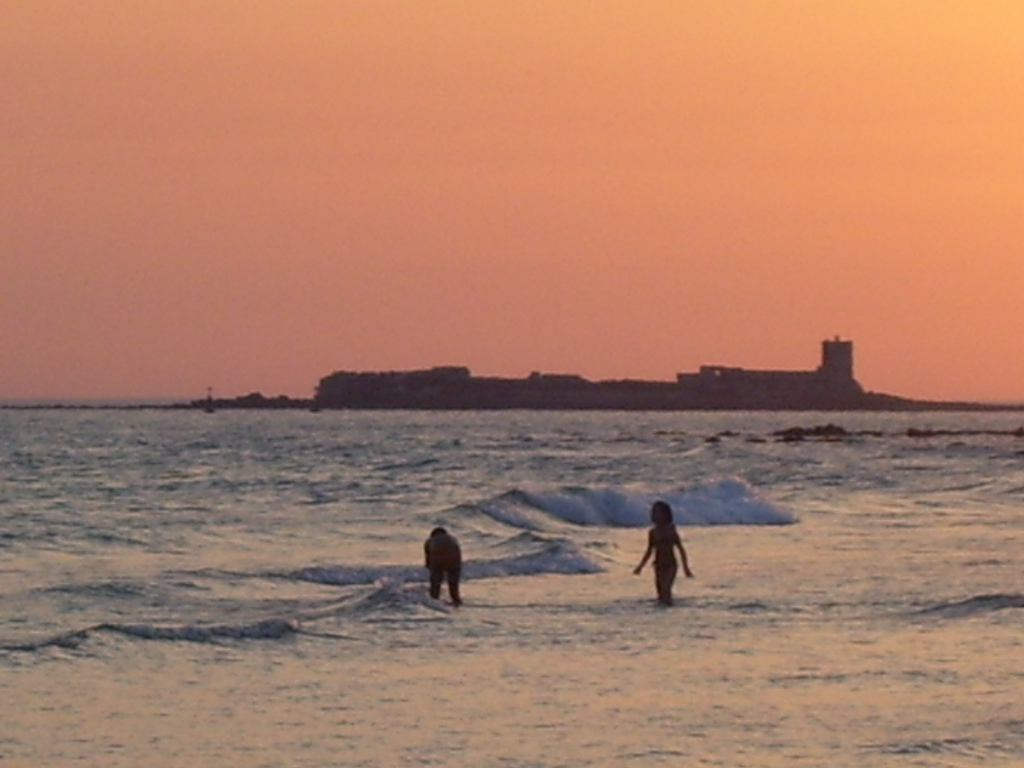
Sancti Petri Island and Castle

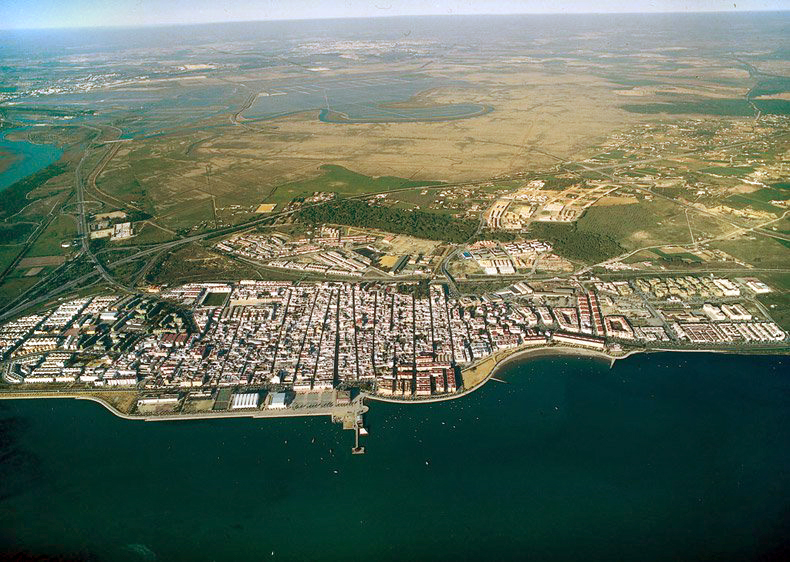
Puerto Real

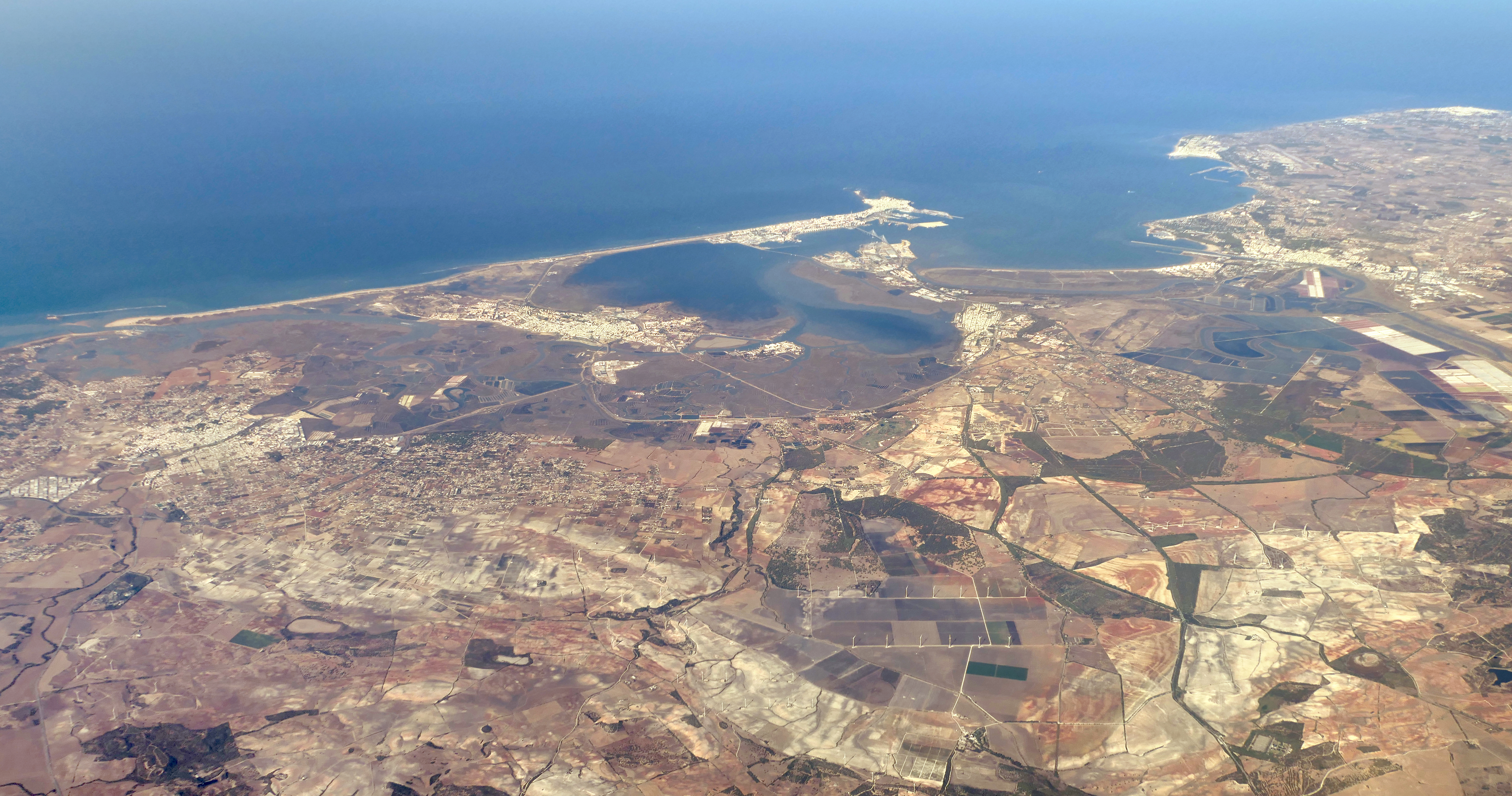
Aerial view of the bay
