= Risse =

Risse is a surname. Its variants are Riss and Rissi. Notable people with the surname include:

- Guenter B. Risse (born 1932), American medical historian
- Marcel Risse (born 1989), German footballer
- Thomas Risse (born 1955), German international relations scholar
- Walter Risse (1893–1969), German footballer
- Walther Risse (1892–1965), German general
