= Alejandro Risso =

Argentine footballer (born 1988)

Personal information
- Full name: Claudio Alejandro Risso
- Date of birth: March 16, 1988 (age 38)
- Place of birth: Luján (BA), Argentina
- Height: 1.70 m (5 ft 7 in)
- Position: Striker

Senior career*
Years	Team	Apps	(Gls)
2006–2008	Flandria	22	(0)
2008–2012	Unión San Felipe	28	(2)
2009	→ Luján (loan)	18	(1)
2010–2011	→ Unión La Calera (loan)	48	(2)
2012	→ Deportes Puerto Montt (loan)	8	(0)
2012–2014	Alumni de Villa María	–	(–)
2014–2015	Midland	8	(1)
2015	Fénix	1	(0)
- * Club domestic league appearances and goals

Claudio Alejandro Risso (born 16 March 1988), known as Alejandro Risso, is an Argentine former footballer who played as a striker.

== Career ==
Besides Argentina, Risso played in Chile for Unión San Felipe, Unión La Calera (loan) and Deportes Puerto Montt (loan).
