= Pedro Javier González =

Spanish guitarist, composer, and record producer

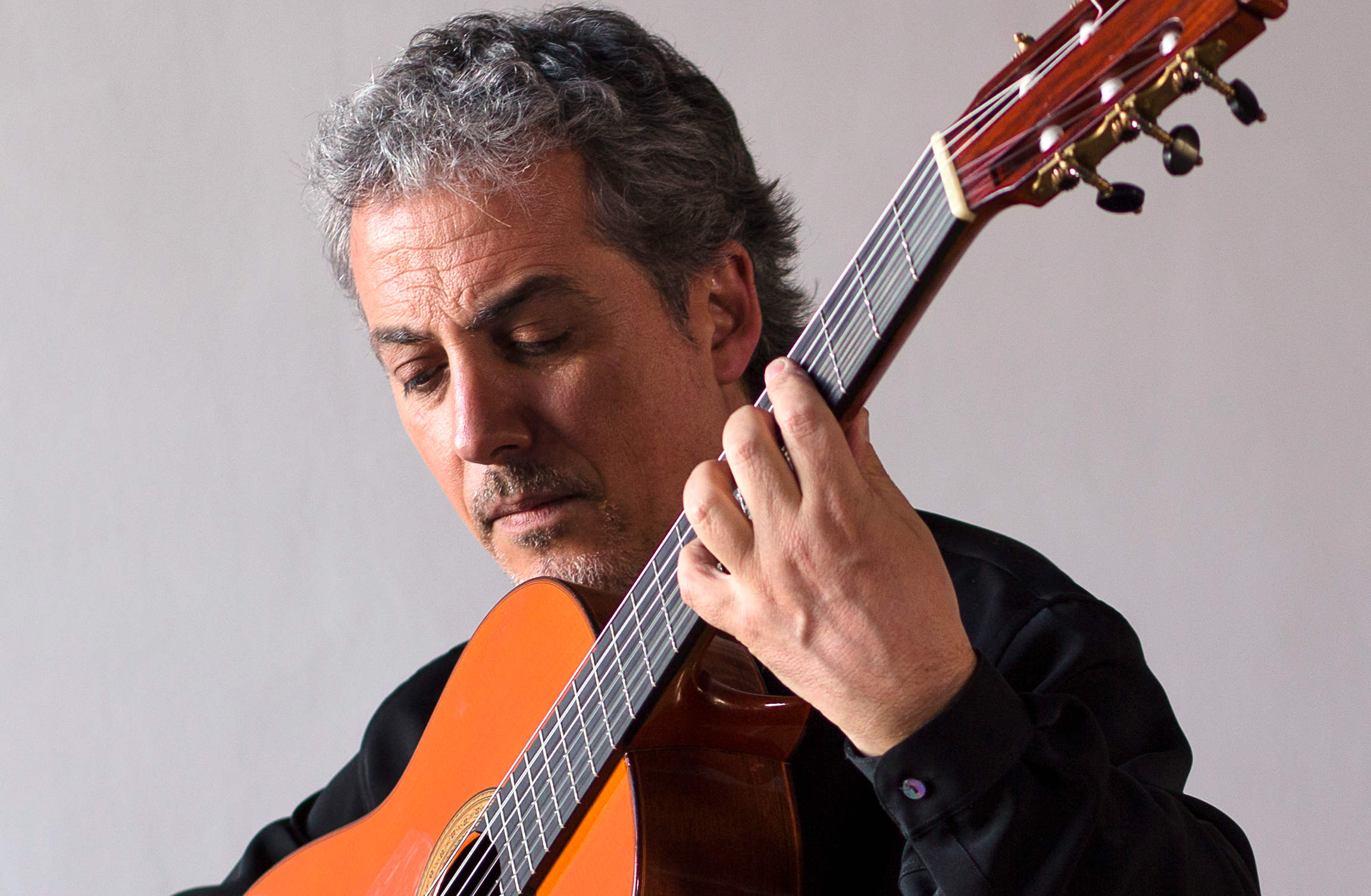

Background information
- Born: Pedro Javier González García; Barcelona, Spain
- Genres: Flamenco rock, classical, jazz, pop rock, world
- Occupations: Musician, composer, record producer
- Instrument: Guitar
- Years active: 1980s–present
- Website: www.pedrojaviergonzalez.com

Pedro Javier González García (born 1962) is a Spanish guitarist, composer, and record producer. He has produced and collaborated with El Último de la Fila, Joan Manuel Serrat, Manolo García and María del Mar Bonet, Victoria de los Ángeles, and Angelo Branduardi. He has also performed at festivals with others such as B.B. King, John McLaughlin, Pat Metheny, Paco de Lucía, John Williams, Tommy Emmanuel, and Tomatito. He is noted for his ability to perform popular standards in a flamenco jazz style.

== Biography ==
=== Early work ===
González was born in Barcelona. In the 1980s he studied with A. F. Serra and Juan Trilla and won the Premio al Toque por Bulerías and first prize in the Certamen de Guitarra flamenca. His first steps as a professional guitarist were supporting Toti Soler, Feliu Gasull, and Ovidi Montllor. He then played in a group with classical guitarists Yoshimi Otani, Alex Garrobé, and Xavier Coll.

=== 1990s ===
In 1990 he began working with El Último de la Fila, playing Spanish guitar for the album Nuevo pequeño catálogo de seres y estares. From there he would begin an important relationship with the band, accompanying them on their next albums and most of their concerts.

In 1992 he formed the band Arrebato with flamenco singer Rafael Maya and released the album Rumba canalla (EMI). The style is close to the nuevo flamenco that appeared in the early 1990s. He then recorded on the albums Astronomía razonable and La rebelión de los hombres rana with El Último de la Fila. On both, Gonzalez played electric and Spanish guitars and accompanied the group on tour. The group was the top-selling act in Spain. Astronomía razonable sold 600,000 copies during its 64-week chart run, and La rebelión de los hombres rana sold 228,000 copies.

During the second half of the 1990s, Gonzalez released three albums featured cover versions of songs by the Eagles, John Lennon, Dire Straits, Supertramp, Simon and Garfunkel, and Eric Clapton, the Police, Bob Dylan, Queen, the Beatles and others.

In early 1997, he recorded the album Callejón del gato. The album contains thirteen instrumental songs, featuring sevillanas, tangos, and bulerías. Before returning to record another album with original compositions, González made several collaborations, playing the Spanish guitar on Arena en los bolsillos (1998) with Manolo García and Cansiones (2000) with Joan Manuel Serrat. He also produced the debut albums of Tomasito and Zalamera.

As a session musician has worked in hundreds of albums for artists such as Toti Soler, Feliu Gasull, Victoria de los Ángeles, El último de la fila, Joan Manuel Serrat, Lluís Llach, Maria del Mar Bonet, Manolo García, Paco Ortega, Mónica Molina, Angelo Branduardi, Roberto Alagna, Charles Aznavour.

=== 2000s–present ===
In 2001, González returned to record a studio album, Árboles nuevos. In parallel, co-produced and played the Spanish guitar in Nunca el Tiempo es Perdido (2001) and Para que no se duerman mis sentidos (2004) with Manolo García. The latter album earned him the nomination of the Premios de la Música for "Best Music Arranger", shared with Manolo and Nacho Lesko. He collaborated with Serrat in Versos en la boca (2003), in which he performed as a flamenco guitarist.

In 2005 he re-recorded and reinterpreted the themes of his first solo album, Callejón del gato under the Alia Records label, and in 2007 published a new album of original compositions called Verdades ocultas y medias mentiras, this time under the GTK label, with 10 instrumental tracks including a cover of Camarón de la Isla's La leyenda del tiempo. González, with Roger Blavia (drums) and Toni Terré (bass) then performed under the name Trío for a series of concerts in Europe. They released a DVD with the live recording in Vicenza, on October 28, 2006. There performances included traditional Spanish flamenco and classical and Spanish versions of classic international pop and rock. The trio performed at the International Kaunas Jazz Festival in Lithuania in October 2011.

Recently he has performed with the double-bass player Horacio Fumero, formed Transversal, with Raúl Rodriguez (Cuban tres), Trilok Gurtu (percussionist) and Guillem Aguilar (bass) and appeared on the French tenor Roberto Alagna’s new album. González performed "Concierto de Aranjuez" as a soloist with the Russian Philharmonic Orchestra in Moscow. He has also recorded guitar for commercials by BMW, Canal+, and Seat Ibiza.
