= Cathy Claret =

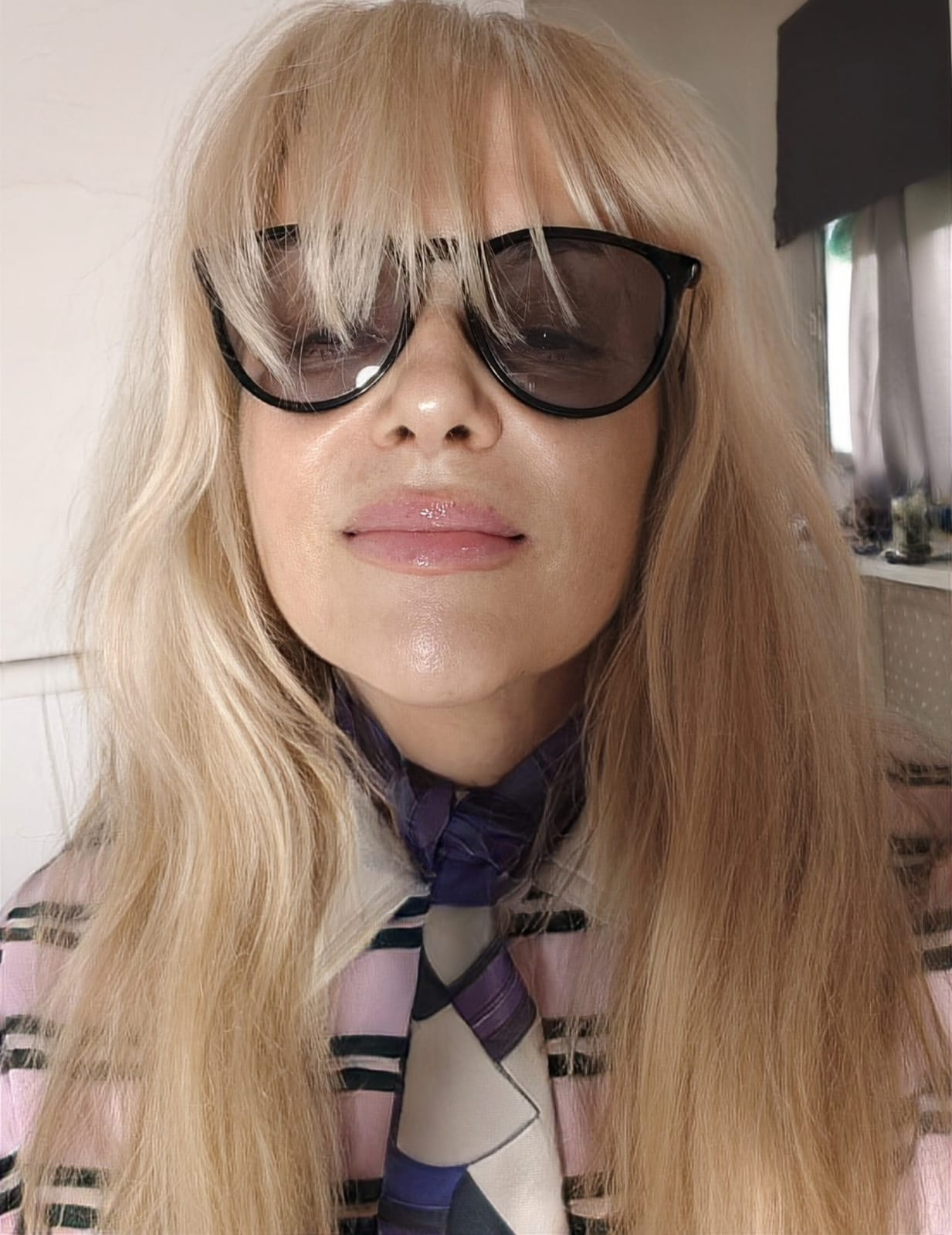
- Cathy Claret

Background information
- Born: 1963 (age 62–63); Nîmes, France
- Origin: Seville, Spain
- Genres: Pop; flamenco; chanson; rumba; bossa nova
- Occupations: Singer; songwriter; composer; producer; multi-instrumentalist
- Instruments: Vocals; guitar; bass; flute; percussion
- Years active: 1983–present
- Labels: Virgin; Crépuscule; Subterfuge; Warner; Respect Record

Cathy Claret (born 1963 in Nîmes, France) is a French singer-songwriter, composer, producer and multi-instrumentalist based in Spain since the 1980s. Her work blends flamenco with pop, chanson, bossa nova and rumba, and Spanish music press has described her as one of the pioneers in the integration of flamenco into pop songwriting. Despite a modest commercial profile in Spain, she has developed a long-standing audience in Japan, a contrast that Late Motiv's host Andreu Buenafuente compared to the documentary Searching for Sugar Man.

== Early life and beginnings ==
Cathy Claret was born in Nîmes, in the south of France, in 1963. According to an interview with El Salto, she worked in the grape harvest in the south of France for several years starting at the age of sixteen, where she came into contact with Gitano families and developed an interest in flamenco through artists such as Camarón de la Isla, Lole y Manuel, Manzanita and Pata Negra. She has stated that the Amador family of Pata Negra became a kind of adoptive family for her.

In the early 1980s she was a founding member of the Bel Canto Orquestra, alongside Pascal Comelade and Pierre Bastien, playing electric bass, transverse flute, percussion and maracas.

== Career ==
=== Virgin France and early singles (1987–1991) ===
Cathy Claret was signed by Emmanuel de Buretel for Virgin Records in France — the same A&R who later signed Manu Chao and Les Rita Mitsouko. Her debut single, "¿Por qué? ¿Por qué?" (Virgin, 1987), featured "El Color" on the B-side, included contributions from Pata Negra and was produced by Ben Rogan, known for his work with Sade. She has stated in interviews that her initial work at Virgin France included writing songs and recording demo vocals for other singers, having been recruited because her voice resembled that of Jeanette. In 1987 she toured France with Pata Negra.

On 27 June 1987, the French television channel TF1 broadcast a report featuring Claret in Barcelona as part of the programme Mini Mag; the report, in which she performs "Por que porque", is preserved by the Institut national de l'audiovisuel. That August, the French music magazine Top 50 devoted a two-page interview to Claret titled "Allo... Cathy Claret" in its issue No. 76 (17–23 August 1987), alongside artists such as Johnny Hallyday and Whitney Houston. The French counter-culture magazine Actuel also profiled her that year in a section titled "Cathy Claret la Gitane" within its feature "Les musiciens qui grandissent la France (sono mondiale…)". The French counter-culture magazine Actuel also profiled her that year in a section titled "Cathy Claret la Gitane" within its feature "Les musiciens qui grandissent la France (sono mondiale…)". The single also received coverage in the European music trade press Music & Media in 1988.

Her debut studio album, Cathy Claret, was released by the Belgian label Les Disques du Crépuscule in 1990, followed by Soleil y locura (Crépuscule, 1991). According to LTM Recordings' historical documentation of the Crépuscule catalogue, both albums were reviewed in the international music press of the period, including Paris Match, Les Inrockuptibles, NME (by Paul Lester) and Melody Maker. Les Inrockuptibles also published an in-depth interview with Claret titled "Parisien tête de chien", written by Bates with photography by Renaud Monfourny. Soleil y locura was licensed for Japanese release by Victor JVC and completed in connection with Claret's first Japanese tour that same year. The album included the song "Bolloré" (later re-titled "Bolleré"), which was subsequently recorded by Raimundo Amador and B. B. King and included on King's compilation His Definitive Greatest Hits. In 1991 she performed at the Shibuya Club Quattro in Tokyo as part of a showcase of artists from Les Disques du Crépuscule. In Spain, the alternative culture magazine Ajoblanco covered Claret in its "Ecos" section in December 1990. The album received a favourable review by Paul Lester in Melody Maker in March 1990, in which he described it as "a nonchalant breath of Andorran mountain air, 12 carelessly whispered ear-massages". In April 1990, Billboard listed her song "Toi" at No. 32 in the "Hot Hits in Tokyo" chart, compiled from the Pioneer Tokyo Hot 100 broadcast by J-Wave 81.3 FM.

=== 2000s ===
El País covered Claret's return to recording in 2000, describing La chica del viento (Zanfonia, 2000) — co-produced by Cathy Claret and Kiko Veneno — as a new stage after her early-1990s work. She subsequently signed with Subterfuge Records, releasing Sussurrando (2003), Sambisarane (2005) — an electronic reinterpretation of her catalogue by Henrik Takkenberg — and Gypsy Flower (2007), which featured collaborations with Finley Quaye, Hook Herrera and Jerónimo Maya. Gypsy Flower was the subject of a cover story titled "Arte gitano, seducción francesa" and an extended interview in the Spanish music magazine Efe Eme in early 2007. In 2005, El País Semanal had also profiled Claret in an extended article by Diego A. Manrique, discussing her musical career, her connection with the Spanish Roma community and her international reception. The article was subsequently translated and reproduced in the French weekly Courrier international as "Adoptée par les Gitans, choyée par les Espagnols". Her performances during this period included concerts at venues such as Casa de América in Madrid.

=== 2010s ===
In 2011, El País published a positive review of her work, and she toured with Raimundo Amador. She released the single "Chocolat" (Chesapik, 2013) and was profiled by RTVE's Mapa Sonoro in 2014. In May 2016, RTVE's Los conciertos de Radio 3 broadcast a live concert by Claret.

In 2015 she released Solita por el mundo under licence to Warner Music, featuring collaborations with Pascal Comelade, Nouvelle Vague, Rossy de Palma and Bebe. In a 2016 interview with 20 minutos, she discussed the album and the Spanish media's portrayal of Romani people.

In 2018 she signed with the Tokyo-based label Respect Record and released Primavera, which received positive reviews in Spanish music press including an 8/10 rating from Mondo Sonoro. The album was also reviewed by the Japanese music publication Mikiki, associated with Tower Records Japan. In Japan, the Tokyo radio station J-Wave included Primavera among its highlighted releases on the programme SAUDE! SAUDADE... hosted by Yasunobu Chujo. That year she also appeared on Late Motiv, the Movistar+ late-night show hosted by Andreu Buenafuente, where her career was framed as a Spanish parallel to Searching for Sugar Man, the documentary about Sixto Rodriguez. Also in 2018, El País reported on Alegrías y penas, a short film directed by Isabel Coixet featuring Claret. RTVE's Gitanos programme dedicated an episode to Claret's Japanese success in December 2018.

=== 2020s ===
She released the album Así soy yo through Respect Record in October 2022, recorded between 2019 and 2022 in the La Mina district of Barcelona with producer Che and flamenco guitarist Eugenio Santiago, and featuring guest vocals from Soleá Morente, Lin Cortés and Raimundo Amador. RTVE's Gitanos programme covered the release in October 2022, discussing the album's Japanese connection and the collaborations with Soleá Morente and Lin Cortés. A digital single from the project, "Agua Cola Cola, Fregasuelo Verde", was released in December 2022; its lyrics reference Romani neighbourhoods including La Mina, Sant Roc, Can Tunis and Las Tres Mil Viviendas. The album was also covered by Mikiki, which discussed the increased presence of Romani influences in her work. In August 2024 she was profiled by Xavier Valiño in an extended feature titled "Cathy Claret, una ciudadana del mundo" on RNE's Las tardes de RNE. In March 2026 she was interviewed by Víctor Fernández in the Personas Curvas segment of Hoy Empieza Todo on RTVE Radio 3.

== Awards and nominations ==
In 1999, Claret was nominated at the third edition of the Premios de la Música in the category of Best Flamenco Author, for the song "Bollere" (as performed by Raimundo Amador), alongside Enrique Morente and Diego el Cigala.

== Museo Flamenco Pop ==
In addition to her musical career, Claret has developed the Museo Flamenco Pop, a documentary and cultural project dedicated to the memory of Roma flamenco-pop and contemporary Romani musical culture. RTVE's Gitanos programme dedicated an episode to the project in April 2023, discussing its archive of records, photographs and documents related to the history of flamenco-pop and its international connections.

== Film music ==
Claret's compositions and performances have also appeared in several films. She contributed the songs "Tango" and "Los picaros tarraneros" to the soundtrack of the French film Sam suffit (1992), directed by Virginie Thévenet. Her composition "Bolleré", in the version by Raimundo Amador and B. B. King, was later included in the soundtrack of the Argentine film Cenizas del paraíso (1997) and in the Spanish documentary Dame veneno (2007). She is also credited with the song "Somos libres" on the soundtrack of the Spanish film Otros días vendrán (2005).

== Style and influence ==
Spanish music press has described her as a "queen of the whispering voice" and the inventor of "pop canastero", and has highlighted her integration of flamenco, rumba, chanson, bossa nova and electronic textures. El Huffington Post has characterised her trajectory as that of a "mainstream artist in Japan, ignored in Spain". According to the Spanish music programme Los Sonidos del Planeta Azul, her flamenco-fusion style anticipated similar projects in Barcelona by a decade, and she has been cited as an influence by artists including Benjamin Biolay, Nouvelle Vague, Finley Quaye, Sly and Robbie and Kahimi Karie.

== Reception in Japan ==
Cathy Claret has had a sustained audience in Japan, where, according to El Salto, she has had imitators since the 1990s. Japanese coverage of her work has linked her vocal style to artists associated with the Shibuya-kei scene, such as Kahimi Karie and Takako Minekawa, and songs of hers have been covered by Japanese singer Yukako Hayase — whose 1989 album Roses' Tails includes a version of Claret's "IL (ベッドの中では)". Mikiki, the editorial site of Tower Records Japan, has discussed the influence of "¿Por qué? ¿Por qué?" on Japanese music later associated with the Shibuya-kei scene. Her recent recording career has been carried out through the Tokyo label Respect Record.

== Discography ==
=== Singles ===
- "¿Por qué? ¿Por qué?" / "El color" (Virgin France, 90314, 1987) — 7"
- "¿Por qué? ¿Por qué?" / "Si ya no hay nada que soñar" (Virgin France, 80377, 1988) — Maxi 12"
- "Loli-Lolita" (Les Disques du Crépuscule, TWI 885-7, 1990) — 7"
- "Le Lundi au Soleil" / "Les Roitelets" (Les Disques du Crépuscule, TWI 931-7, 1990) — 7"
- "Pomme de Pin" / "Los Pícaros Tartaneros" (Les Disques du Crépuscule, TWI 959-7, 1991) — 7"
- "La Chabola" / "Tcheke, Tchike, Tchak" (Crépuscule au Japon / Victor JVC, VIDP-31, 1991) — CD single 3"
- "Chocolat" (Chesapik, 2013)
- "Agua Cola Cola, Fregasuelo Verde" (Respect Record, 2022)

=== Studio albums ===
- Cathy Claret (Les Disques du Crépuscule, 1990)
- Soleil y locura (Les Disques du Crépuscule, 1991)
- La chica del viento (Zanfonia, 2000)
- Sussurrando (Subterfuge Records, 2003)
- Sambisarane (Subterfuge Records, 2005)
- Gypsy Flower (Subterfuge Records, 2007)
- Solita por el mundo (Warner Music, 2015)
- Primavera (Respect Record, 2018)
- Así soy yo (Respect Record, 2022)

=== Compilations ===
- 1987–1991
