= Rock en español =

Spanish-language rock

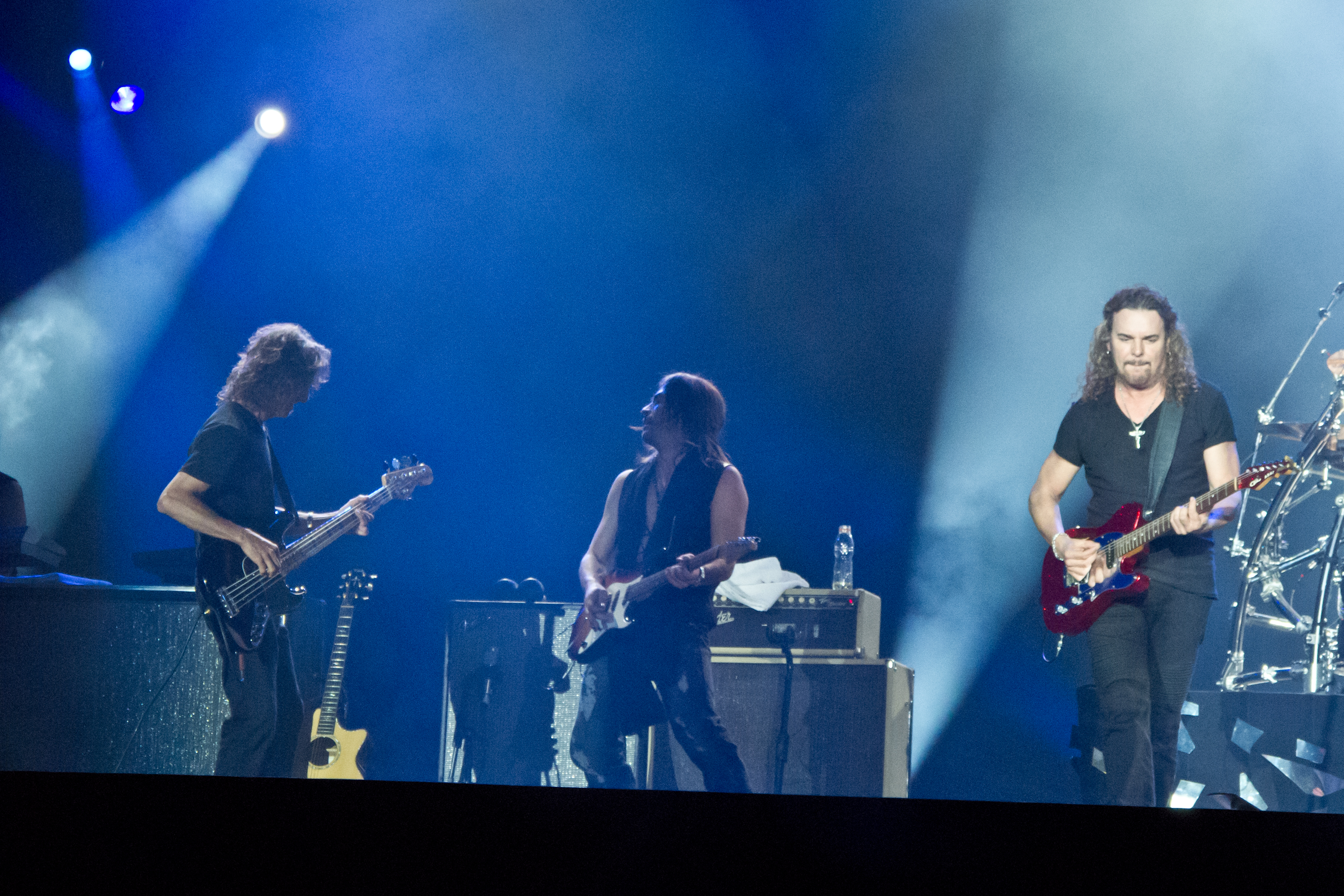
Maná

Rock en español (Spanish for 'Spanish-language rock') is a term used to refer to any kind of rock music featuring Spanish vocals. Compared to English-speaking bands, very few acts reached worldwide success or between Spanish-speaking countries due to a lack of promotion. Despite rock en español's origins in the late 1950s, many rock acts achieved at best nationwide fame until the Internet consolidated the listeners. However, some rock en español artists did become internationally popular with the help of a promotional campaign from the mid-1980s to the mid-1990s called "Rock en tu idioma" ("Rock in your language"). Some specific rock-based styles influenced by folkloric rhythms have also developed in these regions. Some of the more prominent styles are Latin rock (a fusion of rock music with Latin American and Caribbean folkloric sounds developed in Latino communities); Latin alternative, an alternative rock scene that blended a Latin sound with other genres like Caribbean ska, reggae, and soca; or Andalusian rock, a flamenco-influenced style that emerged in Spain.

== History ==
=== Beginnings (1956–1964) ===
Rock and roll is a musical style created by the Afro-descendant community in the United States following the end of World War II in 1945. In the 1950s, musicians such as Little Richard, Chuck Berry, along with white artists like Elvis Presley and Bill Haley, helped popularize the genre, which evolved into a global culture. Spanish-language rock production began in the second half of the 1950s, with musical bands that mostly performed American rock and roll hits translated into Spanish. Although it's difficult to pinpoint exactly when it began to develop, it's true that the first rock recordings featuring Spanish vocals were released around 1956. However, the first major international hit came from saxophonist Danny Flores with the band The Champs, achieving great popularity in the United States (and much of the world) by reaching number one on the Billboard charts in March 1958 with the hit «Tequila». Shortly afterward, also in 1958, «La Bamba», a regional Mexican song performed in a rock rhythm and sung in Spanish by Ritchie Valens, entered the U.S. charts.

The early years of rock en español were generally based on the emergence of groups that tended to cover Anglo-American rock hits by translating them into Spanish. During the transition to the new decade, bands like Los Llopis—who were actually focused on melodic songs and more standardized genres— or Los Teen Tops—who found success both in Latin America and Spain—adapted several early rock and roll songs into Spanish.

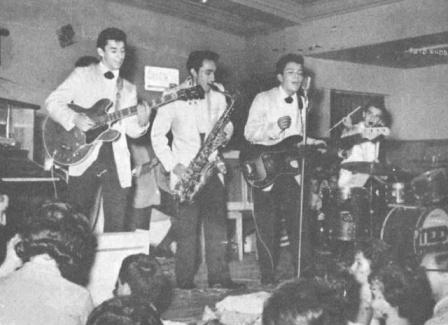
Los Teen Tops performing in Argentina in 1962.

During the early 1960s, rock began to spread widely, and the media started giving it increasing coverage across Spanish-speaking regions. Given its enormous appeal among young audiences, entertainment venues and music promoters began systematically organizing rock concerts; in a short time, the genre became a true mass phenomenon. However, as rock gained more attention, various groups and solo artists gradually emerged who performed original songs in Spanish, moving away from covering American hits and establishing themselves as songwriters, as Dúo Dinámico did. Also notable was the influence of other non-English-speaking European countries, with the arrival of the yé-yé phenomenon. Additionally, in some South American countries, the term Nueva ola (new wave) was coined to encompass artists who adopted the musical influence of rock from the United States and the pop culture patterns of Europe. This pop style, mixed with twist, beat, and rock, gained great popularity in Ibero-America. However, the explosion that came with the arrival of the British Invasion in the mid-decade would be decisive for the development of Spanish-language rock.

=== British invasion effect (1964–1970) ===
After the popularization of The Beatles and the world success of the British Invasion, the Hispanophone world adapted new styles like Beat music, rhythm and blues, psychedelia, soul, folk-rock and pop music. The Beatles and other British beat groups and American rock bands were greatly influenced by American musicians

The influences of beat music and psychedelic pop were noticeable in some acts such as Los Brincos, El Kinto, Los Gatos or The Speakers, while other successful bands featured mostly English and few Spanish vocals like Los Bravos or Los Shakers. Success outside of the native and Spanish-speaking scene proved difficult to attain though, and the few hits these bands achieved worldwide were sung in English, as Miguel Ríos and Los Bravos did for example. Los Saicos were one of the very oldest proto-punk bands in the world. By mid-decade the Mexican (later US citizen) Carlos Santana moved north to California and soon joined the burgeoning San Francisco rock scene. Forming the band Santana towards the end of the sixties, he would gather a shifting group of musicians from mixed Anglo-Saxon and Hispanic backgrounds; the band would become one of the more popular acts of the 1970s in the U.S., Mexico, and Europe and brought together elements of rock, blues and jazz with Latin percussion and harmonics (as evidenced, for example, on Santana (1969), Abraxas (1970) and Santana III (1971)). The band would consistently alternate lyrics in Spanish and English; they were arguably the most successful crossover Latin/Anglo rock band to date, and were important in spreading interest in Latin percussion and drumming around the world.

Although he is not a rock en español musician, Carlos Santana's background is that of a traditional Latin musician who has fused rock guitar (and jazz and salsa rhythms) with classic Latin American songs and a sizeable body of compositions by himself and his band. Their hit song "Oye Como Va" is an example of Santana's latin rock version, being originally composed by famous Latin jazz and mambo musician Tito Puente. From the late 1960s on, concurrently with the success of Santana, there was a growing interest in Latin-American folk music and dancing as well as a worldwide cultural boom for Latin-American literature and its colourful, sometimes surrealist and magic realist storytelling, which sustained an interest in Latin music in general, though not always in Latin rock music as such. There was a noticeable Latin influence in 1970s jazz (e.g. Herbie Hancock, Return to Forever) and some acts like Malo, Sapo, El Chicano were performing Latin Rock during the same decade.

However, styles like blues, acid rock, hard rock, and prog rock would be very influential around the next decade. Almendra, led by Luis Alberto Spinetta, was one of the most important prog bands of the late 1960s and later, Spinetta would become one of the most important artists of the 1970s rock en español scene,

=== Prog rock domain, hard rock origins and Repression (1970–1979) ===
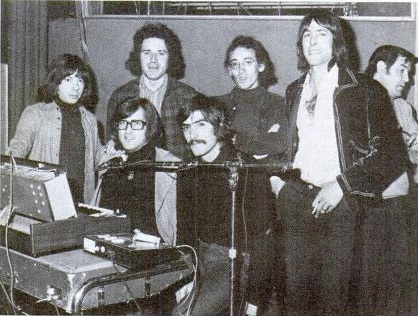
Triana in the recording studio in 1974.

Influenced by the new trends of the 60's, psychedelic acts like Los Dug Dug's, Pescado Rabioso (heavy psych)— or La Revolución de Emiliano Zapata (although rarely they featured Spanish vocals during these years); blues acts like Manal and progressive rock bands like Invisible, Sui Generis (folk prog), Témpano, Los Jaivas (Andean rock), Vox Dei (which style would turn harder sounding) or Triana (heavily influenced by flamenco) and Crack (more British prog-rock influenced) appeared. Triana were pioneers of the Andalusian rock scene, a new style which emerged in Spain that combined prog rock with flamenco.

The first hard rock acts appeared in the early 1970s with bands like Pappo's Blues. Also, a new hard rock movement influenced by prog, blues and punk called Spanish Rock urbano lead the harder scene of the late 1970s with bands like Leño.

But in these days appeared some repression of rock music in Mexico. The government forced artists, labels and radio stations to go "underground" as they associated the music with the breakdown of societal standards. The main pushing edge that created tension with the government was due to the Avándaro Rock Festival in 1971. Also the dictatorship established in Argentina in 1976 made some Argentine artists leave the country for greener pastures in Europe, mostly Spain. They joined the Spanish rock scene and sometimes Hispano-Argentine bands Tequila get formed and achieved success. Tequila joined a rock and roll, glam and rhythm & blues scene along with other Spanish acts Burning or La Orquesta Mondragón.

=== Internationalization (1980s) ===
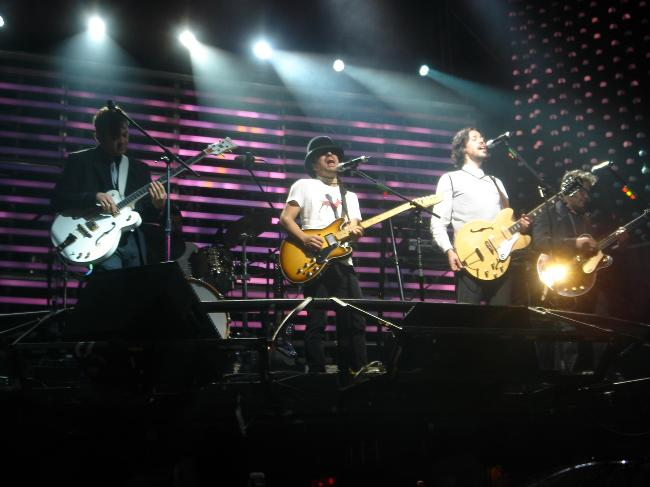
Café Tacuba

The most prominent punk bands appeared along the 1980s with La Polla Records, Siniestro Total or Los Violadores. Subgenres derived from punk like New Wave and Post punk were also important during the 1980s. La Movida Madrileña was an important movement of these styles among others. In the mid-1980s, a promotional campaign called "Rock en tu idioma" (Rock in your language) started helping to internationalize some bands. Soda Stereo is largely credited as the first Spanish-language rock band to gain widespread popularity across Latin America. However, there was equal transnational success in the mid to late 1980s from Virus, Radio Futura, Enanitos Verdes, Caifanes, Hombres G, Los Prisioneros and Océano among others during the same time period.

Though mainly a teen-pop band, Puerto Rican band Menudo at times also dabbled into rock en español during this decade; examples of their rock music work include their albums "Quiero Ser" (alternatively named "Rock Chiquillo" in some markets), "A Todo Rock" and "Hijos del Rock" as well as songs such as "Quiero Rock", "Rock en la TV", "Mi Banda Toca Rock", "Sube a mi Motora" and "Jovenes". Similarly, Los Chicos de Puerto Rico a band that was similar to Menudo, had a song named "Rock Solido" which was released during 1983.

=== Recent times (1990s onward) ===
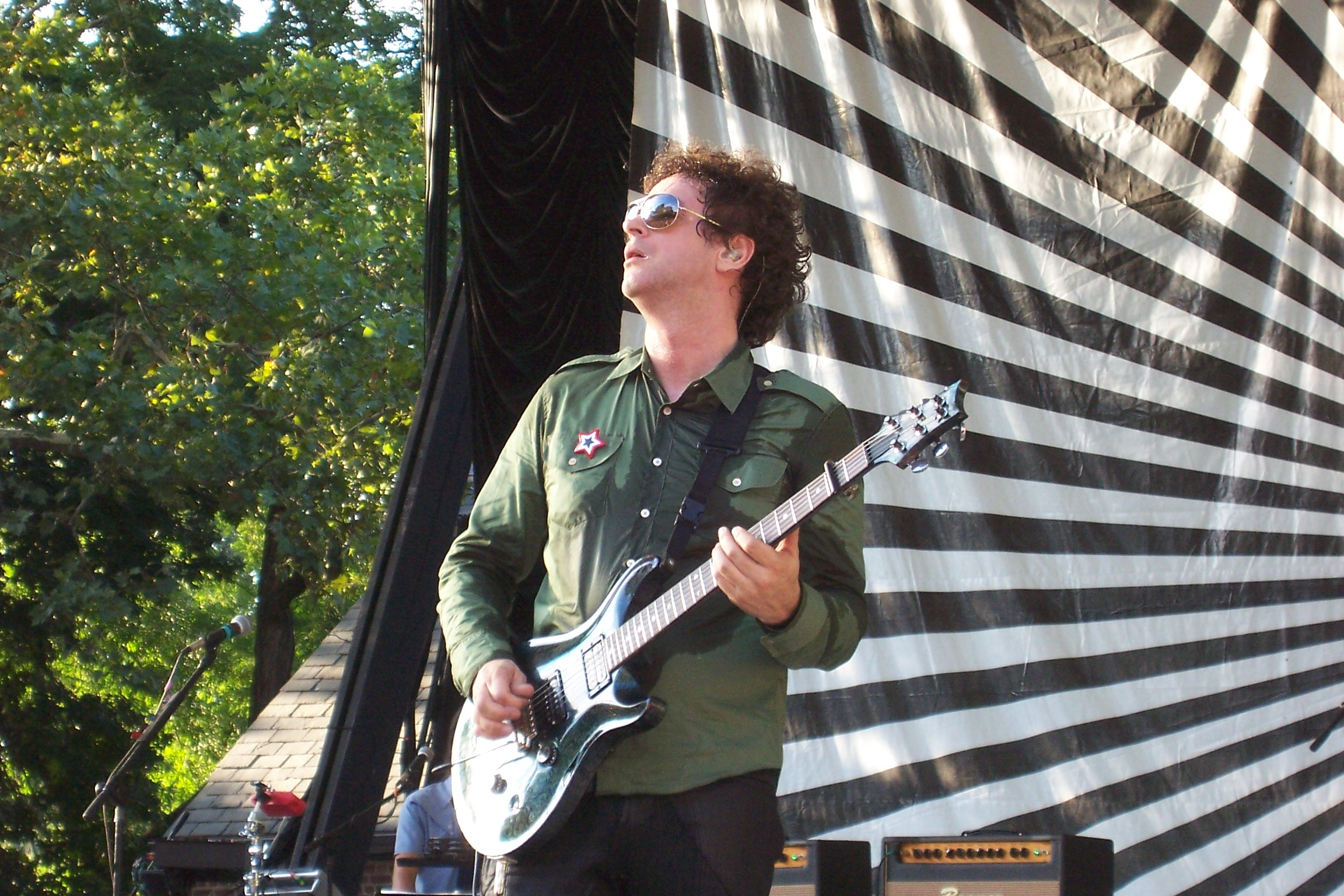
Gustavo Cerati in New York City 2006.

The final amalgamation into a coherent international scene was helped by the introduction of MTV Latin America in 1993, where the first video shown, "We are sudamerican rockers" by Chilean band Los Prisioneros, reflected its aims to create a Latin American scene. In the late 1990s, MTV created the Latino Award in the MTV Video Music Awards and Premios MTV Latinoamérica in 2002, awards that recognize the talented bands and achievements of the genre. However, MTV Latin America was criticized for focusing primarily on rock bands from Argentina and Mexico, with the occasional band from Chile or Colombia. For example, bands on MTV Latino that received very regular airplay were Soda Stereo, Los Fabulosos Cadillacs, Los Amigos Invisibles, Mano Negra, Café Tacuba, Los Tres, Aterciopelados, Maldita Vecindad, Babasónicos, Los Rodríguez and Héroes del Silencio. On the other hand, some hard rock bands like La Renga, Cuca or Extremoduro achieved success.

During the success of Alternative rock in the 1990s, many bands performed alt rock and Latin Alternative (style that combined alt rock with ska, reggae and Latin folkloric elements) like Caifanes, Café Tacuba, Robi Draco Rosa, and La Ley initiated a new stage of Latin rock by broadening its international appeal. Since then, successful bands and musicians include Maná, Libido, Jaguares, Caramelos de Cianuro, Aterciopelados, Bersuit Vergarabat, Jorge Drexler and Los Tres among others. The new bands were able to be successful through the development of the music video in the 1990s.

== Rock en español in the United States ==
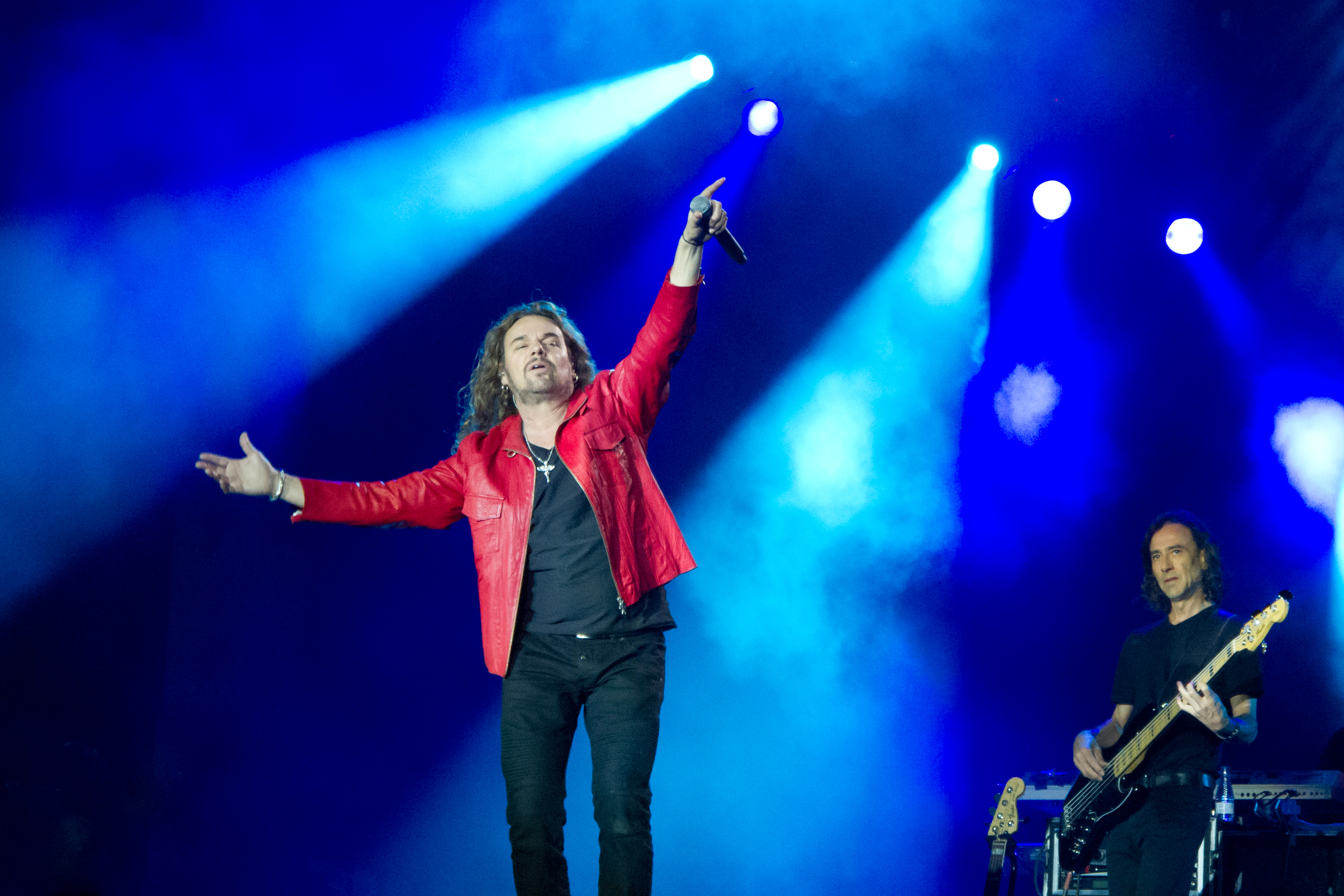
Maná has earned four Grammy Awards.

Rock en español borrows heavily from rock and roll music and traditional and popular music of Spanish-speaking countries such as cumbia, ranchera, rumba, and tango. In its 50-year history, it has evolved from having a cult-like following to being a more well established music scene.

== Local scenes ==
- Argentine rock
- Chilean rock
- Colombian rock
- Costa Rican rock
- Cuban rock
- Dominican rock
- Ecuadorian rock
- Guatemalan rock
- Mexican rock
- Peruvian rock
- Puerto Rican rock
- Spanish rock
- Uruguayan rock
- Venezuelan rock

== See also ==
- Brown-eyed soul
- Latin alternative
- Latin American music
- Flamenco rock
- Latin Grammy Award for Best Rock Album
- Tejano music
- La Movida Madrileña
- Rock en tu idioma
- Latino punk
