= Tino di Geraldo =

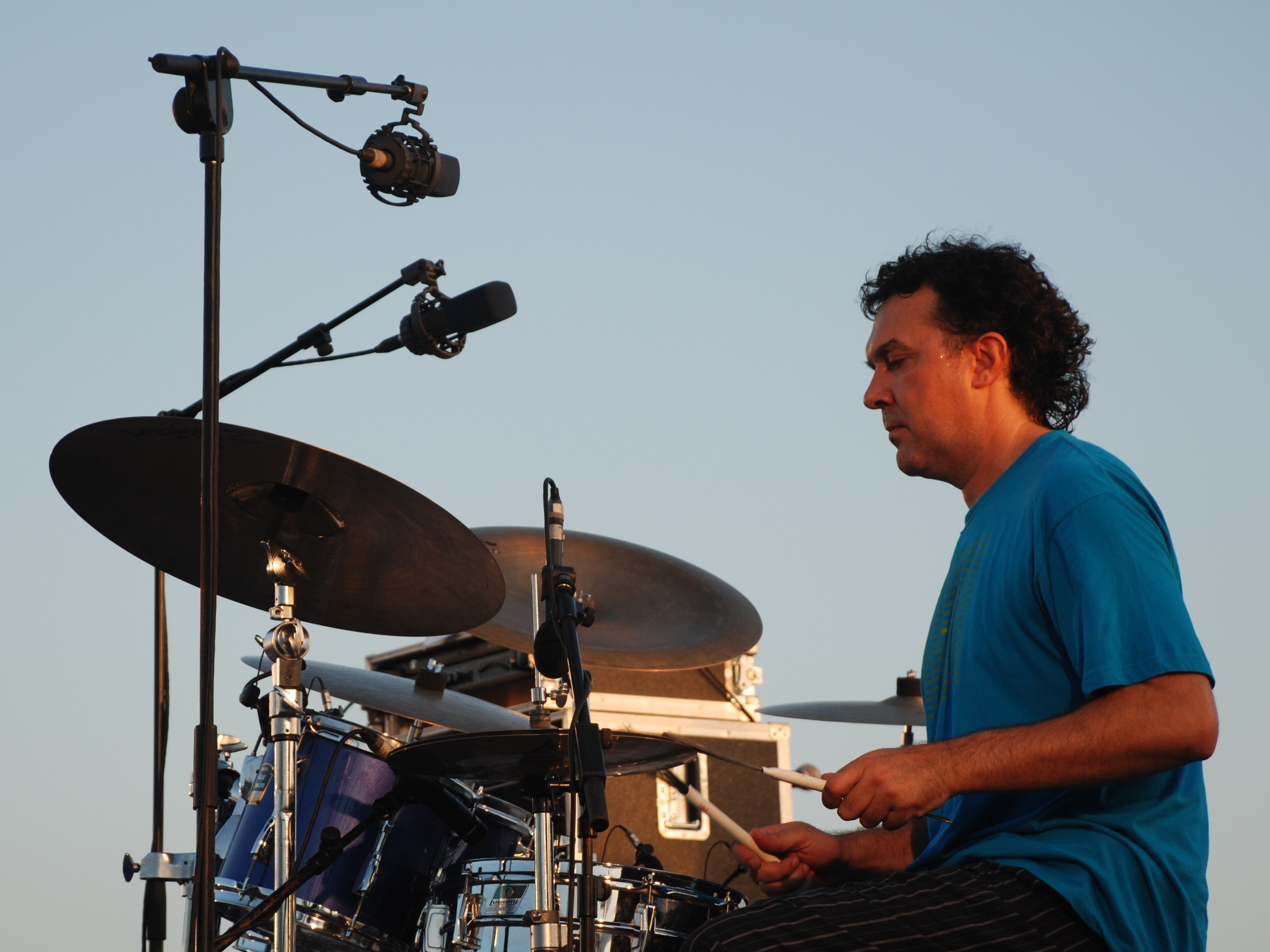
Tino di Geraldo

Tino di Geraldo (born Faustino Fernández Fernández in 1960) is a French-Spanish percussionist, tabla player, drummer, and producer. He is one of Spain's leading flamenco and jazz percussionists, bringing classical and jazz influences to flamenco, with a punk-rock background. Billboard cited him as an "eminent flamenco musician".

== Biography ==
The son of an Asturian couple, Geraldo was born in Toulouse and spent his childhood in France. He gained a background in classical and jazz percussion before he got his start in flamenco as a young man in Madrid, having met Diego Carrasco who needed a percussionist. He has worked with some of the biggest names in flamenco and Latin music including Paco de Lucía, Tomatito, Chano Domínguez, Carlos Núñez, Raimundo Amador, Javier Álvarez, Niña Pastori, and Manolo Sanlúcar. He has also worked with musicians outside Spain, and has worked with French/Vietnamese jazz guitarist Nguyen Le and American folk musician Jackson Browne, featuring on and producing for his fourth live album Love Is Strange: En Vivo Con Tino and on the song "These Days", touring with him since 2006. He featured on Paco de Lucia's 1998 album Luzia.

Geraldo formed a group with Carles Benavent and Jorge Pardo, both of which also performed with Paco de Lucia and toured in 1998 and again in 2007–8. Geraldo played percussion on Pardo's 2332 album, and Moraíto's Aire album. Geraldo's 2003 album Tino, took three years to complete and had only one flamenco track. Billboard cited him in 1996 as an "eminent flamenco musician". He has produced albums for Luz Casal, Carrasco, Elbicho, Jazzpaña, and Tomasito.
