= El Patio =

Studio album by Triana
- Released: 14 April 1975
- Studio: Estudios Kirios, Madrid
- Genre: Andalusian rock
- Length: 39:09
- Language: Spanish
- Label: Movieplay; Fonomusic (CD release)
- Producer: Triana

Triana chronology
El Patio (1975)	Hijos del agobio (1977)

The untitled first studio album by the Spanish rock band Triana, commonly known as El patio, was released on 14 April 1975. At first it was a commercial failure but as the band became popular the album sales increased.

The first CD issue dates from 1988, released under the Fonomusic label; the album was also released in the US by Warner Music in 2003.

== Track listing ==
Side one
No.	Title	Writer(s)	Length
1.	"Abre la puerta"	Jesús de la Rosa	9:49
2.	"Luminosa mañana"	Jesús de la Rosa	4:01
3.	"Recuerdos de una noche"	Jesús de la Rosa	4:40

Side two
No.	Title	Writer(s)	Length
4.	"Sé de un lugar"	Jesús de la Rosa	7:11
5.	"Diálogo"	Jesús de la Rosa	4:32
6.	"En el lago"	Jesús de la Rosa	6:38
7.	"Todo es de color"	(M. Molina/J. J. Palacios)	2:08

On some CD reissues, the track order is 1-4-7-2-5-6-3.

== Reception ==
El Patio is one of the most acclaimed Spanish rock albums of all time, for both critics and the public.

Albums reviews

- Top 100 Spanish albums of the 20th century according to Rockdelux magazine. (#15)
- "Los 250: Essential Albums of All Time Latin Alternative - Rock Iberoamericano," (#43)
- Top 50 Spanish rock albums according to Rolling Stone. (#23)
- Top 100 Spanish pop albums ever according to Efe Eme. (#25)

== Staff ==
- Jesús de la Rosa Luque – vocals, keyboards
- J. J. Palacios "Tele" – drums, percussion
- Eduardo Rodríguez – guitar

Additional personnel

- Manolo Rosa – bass
- Antonio García de Diego – electric guitar
- Máximo Moreno - artwork
