= La Leyenda del Tiempo =

La leyenda del tiempo

Studio album by Camarón
- Released: 1979
- Genre: New flamenco
- Label: PolyGram
- Producer: Ricardo Pachón

Camarón chronology
Castillo de Arena (1977)	La leyenda del tiempo (1979)	Como el Agua (1981)

La leyenda del tiempo is the tenth album by Spanish flamenco singer Camarón de la Isla, and the first one not to feature his long-time collaborator, guitarist Paco de Lucía. It is regarded as a turning point in the history of flamenco, contributing to the popularization of nuevo flamenco (new flamenco). A commercial failure due to its departure from traditional flamenco, which "scandalised purists", the album has received widespread critical acclaim.

== Reception ==
Professional ratings
Review scores
Source	Rating
Allmusic	4/5 stars

Upon release, the album divided the public "between partisans and critics of Camarón's new flamenco schemes". By the time of Camarón's death, the album began to garner universal critical acclaim. In his review for AllMusic, Don Snowden praised the album describing it as "a bona fide before/after landmark in the flamenco world". Both the title track and especially "Volando voy", a rumba composed by Kiko Veneno, are among Camarón's most popular songs.

The album was included in Tom Moon's 1,000 Recordings to Hear Before You Die.

== Track listing ==
1. "La Leyenda del Tiempo" (Federico García Lorca/Ricardo Pachón) – (Jaleos) 3:41
2. "Romance del Amargo" (García Lorca/Pachón) – (Bulerías por soleá) 3:47
3. "Homenaje a Federico" (García Lorca/Pachón/Kiko Veneno) – (Bulerías) 4:10
4. "Mi Niña se Fue a la Mar" (García Lorca/Pachón/Veneno) – (Cantiñas de Pinini) 3:05
5. "La Tarara" (Trad. Arr. Ricardo Pachón) – (Canción) 3:46
6. "Volando Voy" (Veneno) – (Rumba) 3:25
7. "Bahía de Cádiz" (Pachón/Fernando Villalón) – (Alegrías de baile) 2:56
8. "Viejo Mundo" (Omar Khayyám/Veneno) – (Bulerías) 2:45
9. "Tangos de la Sultana" (Antonio Casas/Pachón/Francisco Velázquez) – (Tangos) 4:29
10. "Nana del Caballo Grande" (García Lorca/Pachón) – (Nana) 4:58

== Personnel ==
- Camarón - vocals
- Tomatito - flamenco guitar
- Raimundo Amador - flamenco guitar
- Jorge Pardo - flute
- Manolo Marinelli - keyboards
- Rafael Marinelli - piano
- Pepe Roca - electric guitar
- Gualberto García - sitar
- Rubem Dantas - percussion
- Tito Duarte - percussion
- José Antonio Galicia - drums
- Antonio Moreno "Tacita" - drums
- Pepe Ébano - bongo
- Manolo Rosa: bass guitar
