= Smash (Spanish band) =

Spanish psychedelic rock band

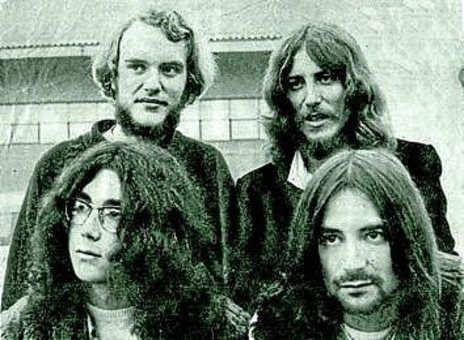
- Clockwise, from top left: Henrik Liebgott, Julio Matito, Gualberto García, Antonio Rodríguez

Background information
- Origin: Seville, Andalusia, Spain
- Genres: Psychedelic rock; blues rock; progressive rock
- Years active: 1967–1973
- Labels: PolyGram, Philips, Bocaccio
- Members: Gualberto García; Julio Matito; Antonio Rodríguez; Henrik Liebgott; Manuel Molina

Smash were a Spanish psychedelic rock band formed by the sitar and guitar player Gualberto García and singer and bassist Julio Matito (1946-1979) in 1967, which was active up to 1973. Flamenco singer Manuel Molina joined the band in 1971 and they introduced flamenco elements in their last compositions pioneering the Andalusian rock. The band reunited in 1979, but Julio Matito died in a car accident a few days later.

== Discography ==
=== Studio albums ===
- Glorieta de los lotos, Polygram Ibérica (1970).
- We come to smash this time, Polygram Ibérica (1971).

=== Compilation albums ===
- Vanguardia y pureza del flamenco (cara A) (1978).
- Todas sus grabaciones (1969-1978).

=== Singles ===
- Scouting / Sonetto, Diábolo (1969).
- Scouting / Ensayo nº1, Diábolo (1970).
- I Left You / One Hopeless Whisper, Philips (1970).
- Decision / Look At The Rainbow, Philips (1970).
- Decision / I Left You, Pérgola (1970).
- Well, you know / Love Millionaire, Philips (1970).
- We come to smash this time/ My funny girl, Philips (1971).
- El garrotín / Tangos de Ketama, Bocaccio (1971).
- Ni recuerdo ni olvido (parte 1/ parte 2), Bocaccio (1971).
- Ni Recuerdo ni Olvido (parte 1/ parte 2), Chapa (1978).
