= List of number-one hits of 1962 (Peru) =

This is a list of the songs that reached number one in Peru in 1962, according to Billboard magazine with data provided by the Peruvian newspaper, La Prensa.

Issue date	Song	Artist(s)	Ref
January 6	"Escándalo"	Javier Solís	
January 13	"Escándalo"	Javier Solís	
January 27	"La del vestido rojo"	Fernando Borges/Sensación Caney/Lucho Macedo/Gustavo "Hit" Moreno/Tony Vilar/Hermanos Ponce	
February 3	"La del vestido rojo"	Fernando Borges/Sensación Caney/Lucho Macedo/Gustavo "Hit" Moreno/Tony Vilar/Hermanos Ponce	
February 10	"La del vestido rojo"	Fernando Borges/Sensación Caney/Lucho Macedo/Gustavo "Hit" Moreno/Tony Vilar/Hermanos Ponce	
February 17	"La del vestido rojo"	Fernando Borges/Sensación Caney/Lucho Macedo/Gustavo "Hit" Moreno/Tony Vilar/Hermanos Ponce	
February 24	"La del vestido rojo"	Fernando Borges/Sensación Caney/Lucho Macedo/Gustavo "Hit" Moreno/Tony Vilar/Hermanos Ponce	
March 3	"La del vestido rojo"	Fernando Borges/Sensación Caney/Lucho Macedo/Gustavo "Hit" Moreno/Tony Vilar/Hermanos Ponce	
March 10	"Poquita fe"	Los Panchos/Olga Guillot	
March 17	"Poquita fe"	Los Panchos/Olga Guillot	
March 24	"Poquita fe"	Los Panchos/Olga Guillot	
March 31	"Poquita fe"	Los Panchos/Olga Guillot	
April 28	"Town Without Pity"	Gene Pitney	
May 5	"Town Without Pity"	Gene Pitney	
May 12	"Norma"	Gustavo "Hit" Moreno	
May 19	"Norma"	Gustavo "Hit" Moreno	
May 26	"Norma"	Gustavo "Hit" Moreno	
June 2	"Norma"	Gustavo "Hit" Moreno	
June 9	"Norma"	Gustavo "Hit" Moreno	
June 16	"Norma"	Gustavo "Hit" Moreno	
June 23	"Norma"	Gustavo "Hit" Moreno	
June 30	"Norma"	Gustavo "Hit" Moreno	
July 28	"Única"	Eduardo Farrell	
August 4	"Única"	Eduardo Farrell	
August 11	"Única"	Eduardo Farrell	
August 18	"Única"	Eduardo Farrell	
August 25	"Uh-Huh"	Paul Anka	
September 1	"Uh-Huh"	Paul Anka	
September 8	"La gorda"	Los Llopis	
September 15	"La gorda"	Los Llopis	
September 22	"La gorda"	Los Llopis	
September 29	"La gorda"	Los Llopis	
October 6	"Ligados"	Fausto Papetti/Ricardo Roda/Eulogio Molina/Orlando Ferrari	
October 13	"Ligados"	Fausto Papetti/Ricardo Roda/Eulogio Molina/Orlando Ferrari	
November 10	"Hava Nagela"	Chubby Checker	
November 17	"Hava Nagela"	Chubby Checker	
November 24	"The Wah-Watusi"	The Orlons/Jorge Conty/Joe Danova/Los Harmonics	
December 1	"The Wah-Watusi"	The Orlons/Jorge Conty/Joe Danova/Los Harmonics	
December 8	"The Wah-Watusi"	The Orlons/Jorge Conty/Joe Danova/Los Harmonics	
December 15	"Speedy Gonzales"	Pat Boone/Manolo Muñoz/Jorge Conty/Los Gorrioncitos/Los Campeones	
December 22	"Speedy Gonzales"	Pat Boone/Manolo Muñoz/Jorge Conty/Los Gorrioncitos/Los Campeones	
December 29	"Speedy Gonzales"	Pat Boone/Manolo Muñoz/Jorge Conty/Los Gorrioncitos/Los Campeones	

== See also ==
- 1962 in music
