= Bolívar el héroe =

- Directed by: Guillermo Rincón
- Written by: Ricardo Pachón
- Produced by: Guillermo Rincón
- Music by: Sebastián Bernal
- Release date: December 25, 2003
- Running time: 75 minutes
- Country: Colombia
- Language: Spanish
- Budget: $70,000

Bolívar el héroe (Bolivar the Hero) is a Colombian animated film released in 2003. It is a biographical film that focuses the life of Simón Bolívar, a Venezuelan man who led the fight for independence across much of South America from Spain. Though it takes inspiration from anime, the film was negatively received by audiences, with the art style becoming a major point of criticism.

== Plot ==
It tells the story of the Liberator Simón Bolívar through characters and situations of fiction. For example, attempts were made to simplify the conflict against Spain by creating the composite character "Tiránico", symbolizing Spanish evil and oppression. His counterpart is "Américo", who represents the slavery and the craving for freedom of the people. These characters feature throughout Bolívar's life, respectively being a very personal enemy and ally to him.

== Production ==
The producers never directly documented the film's production cost. However, thanks to information given by Míquel Diaz Ramajo, it is known that through personal messages, one of the producers of the film (Miguel Angel Vasquez Aguirre) gave director Guillermo del Rincon a budget of US$70,000 to produce the film.

== Release ==
The film premiered on December 25, 2003, running for over 4 weeks. It was shown at a series of film festivals, including the Havana Film Festival in December of 2004, the 7th Cartagena Film Festival in October of 2005, and the Guadalajara International Book Fair (FIL) in November 2007.

== Reception ==
The movie received overwhelmingly negative reception, mostly attributed to its poor animation quality. It became infamous among anime fans for its attempt at emulating the distinct anime art style, comparing it unfavorably to Jojo's Bizarre Adventure.

== See also ==
- Simón Bolívar (1942 film)
- Simón Bolívar (1969 film)
- The Liberator (film)
