= Medina Azahara (band) =

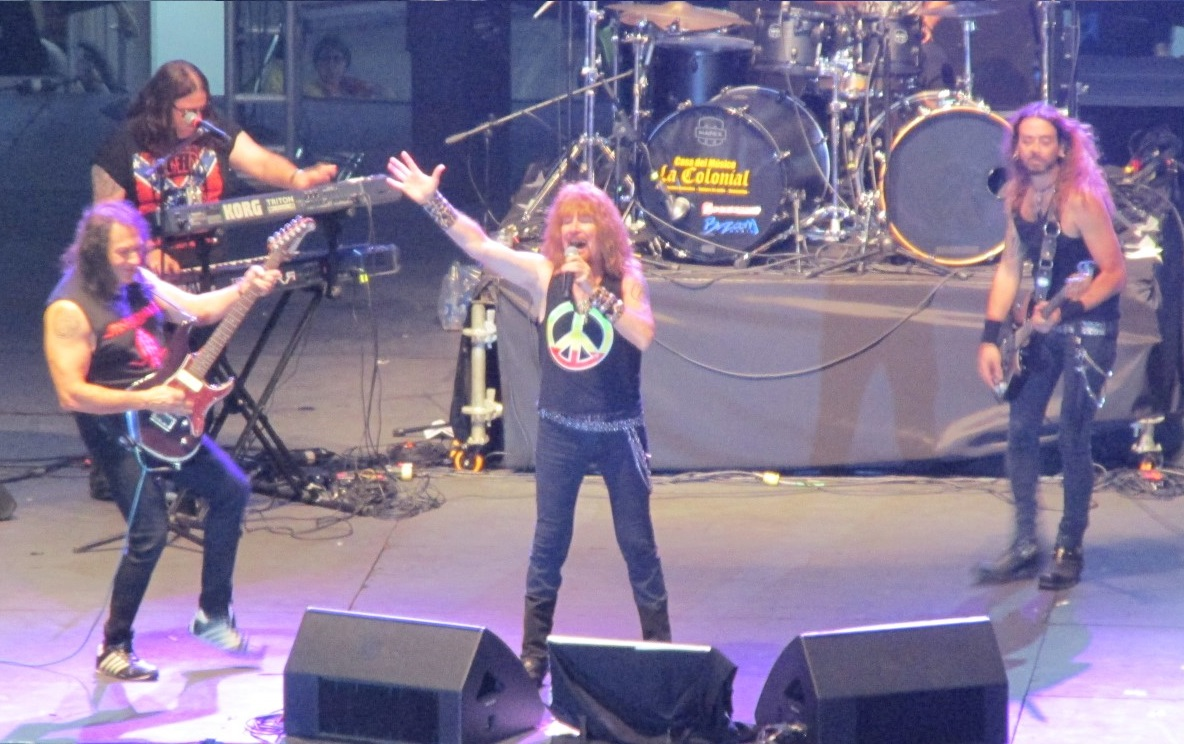
- Medina Azahara live in Bogotá, Colombia, 2014.

Background information
- Origin: Córdoba, Spain
- Genres: Hard rock, symphonic rock, andalusian rock, progressive rock, heavy metal, neoclassical metal
- Years active: 1979–present
- Labels: CBS Records, Tuboescape, Avispa, PIAS Spain, Mano Negra / Senador
- Website: http://www.medinaazahara.es/

Medina Azahara is a hard rock band formed in Córdoba, Spain in 1979.

== History ==
The group was founded by Manuel Martínez (vocals), Miguel Galán (guitar), José Antonio Molina (drums), Manuel Molina (bass), and Pablo Rabadán (keyboards).

In their early years they were part of the Andalusian rock scene from the 80s, influenced by acts like Deep Purple, Pink Floyd, Triana, and Uriah Heep, among others. Later on their style shifted toward a melodic heavy metal sound with neoclassical undertones.

The line-up has changed several times through the years, though the band is still recording and touring through Spain, with frontman Manuel Martínez standing as the only original member.

In 2018, three former members, Miguel Galán, José Antonio Molina, and Randy López, formed a tribute group called ExMedinas with other musicians, performing songs from the early period of the band.

== Discography ==
Studio albums

- 1979: Medina Azahara (AKA Paseando por la mezquita)
- 1981: La esquina del viento
- 1982: Andalucía
- 1987: Caravana española
- 1989: ... En Al-Hakim
- 1992: Sin tiempo
- 1993: Dónde está la luz
- 1995: Árabe
- 1998: Tánger
- 2000: XX
- 2001: Tierra de libertad
- 2003: Aixa
- 2005: La estación de los sueños
- 2007: Se abre la puerta
- 2009: Origen y leyenda
- 2011: La historia continúa
- 2012: La memoria perdida
- 2014: Las puertas del cielo
- 2016: Paraíso prohibido
- 2018: Trece Rosas
- 2021: Llegó el día
- 2023: El sueño eterno

== Members ==
- Manuel Martínez - vocals
- Paco Ventura - guitar
- Juanjo Cobacho - bass
- Nacho Santiago - drums
- Manuel Ibáñez - keyboards

== Past members ==
- Miguel Galán - guitar
- José Antonio Molina - drums
- Manuel S. Molina - bass
- Randy López - bass
- Pablo Rabadán - keyboards
- José Miguel Fernández - bass
