= David Meza =

David Meza may refer to:

- David Meza (basketball) (born 1985), Mexican former basketball player
- David Meza (footballer) (born 1988), Paraguayan footballer
- David Meza (journalist) (1959–2010), Honduran journalist
- David José Meza (born 1987), Honduran footballer
