= Gualberto García Pérez =

Spanish musician

- Born: 1945 (age 79–80)
- Origin: Spain
- Occupation: Musician

Gualberto García Pérez is a Spanish musician regarded as a pioneer of the flamenco fusion, also called Andalusian rock.

== Childhood ==
Gualberto was born in 1945 in Sevilla. His maternal grandfather was a jack-of-all-trades who sung Flamenco, nicknamed Currillo el Calentero. His mother, Pastora Pérez Peral, was an amateur flamenco singer well-regarded by her neighbors. Gualberto entered the Salesians school where his two passions in life were formed: football and music. Under the attentive guidance of Don Pedro, his early mentor at the Salesians school, Gualberto and his classmates went on to become part of the local lore of Triana when his entire school football team was absorbed into the professional Real Betis Balompié soccer club. Gualberto would reach the All-Andalusian team and others, like Quino (Joaquín Sierra Vallejo), would go so far as to play for the Spain national football team.

== Youth ==
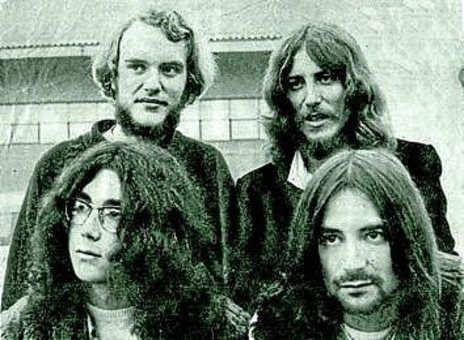
Gualberto (front row, right) as part of the band Smash in 1970

At the age of 17, Gualberto quit football to dedicate himself to music, forming the rock group The Bats, which was followed in 1967 by Smash, a group which pioneered Spanish and Andalusian Rock history.

== America ==
After disbanding the group, Gualberto left Spain for the US to study music, alongside his first wife, Jessica Jones Carson, an American from New York City. There, he began to establish himself as a composer. His first work was the rock opera "Behind Stars"; in cooperation with the "Good Vibrations Studio" and the "Yoga Symphony Orchestra", he formed a group for it with the famous Hindu sitar player Diwan Mothihar. This first solo recording has not been released yet. His early works feature the voice and lyrics of his first wife.

== Return to Spain ==
Returning to Spain he published two solo albums: "A la vida al dolor" ("To life and pain ") and "Vericuetos" ("Loopholes"). In 1976 he spent several months in France and the Netherlands, composing chamber music, which would lead to his next record: "Otros días" ("Other Days"). Between 1976 and 1979 he arranged and collaborated several projects, rock and flamenco compositions, which were all brought together on "Inquietudes a compás" ("Beat Concerns"), re-released in 1997. In 1979 he recorded a fusion album between cante jondo songs (pure flamenco) and sitar called "Gualberto and Agujetas" (included on his 1997 album).

== The 80s ==
During this decade he made mostly orchestration arrangements, such as flamenco and classical instrumentation. At this time he arranged "Casta" ("Caste") for Lole y Manuel and "Cuaderno de coplas" ("Song Notebook") and "A través del olvido" ("Through oblivion) by Carlos Cano, as well as the song "Rimas de Bécquer," for Benito Moreno. He also recorded the album "Puentes"("Bridges,") and compositions for a clarinet trio called "Quartet Biennial," a work for the Banda Municipal de Sevilla, as well as a piece called "Turruñuelo" for an inaugural concert of the second Biennial. Gualberto has also directed the Triana's Rociero Choir longer than any other director in its history. Under his direction, many successful albums were released.

In 1983, after some memorable concerts with Ricardo Miño, he is asked to record once more live with Miño, which resulted in the album "Puente Mágico" ("Magical Bridge")

In 1987, Gualberto started getting involved with musical computer science, which prompted the creation of his own studio, which he uses mainly to create music for cinema and television.

== The 90s ==
In 1990 he returned to the performing scene, touring for a long summer. From this period, the first Cycle of the New Music at the University of Seville stands out. Also from this period is the album "Sin Comentario" ("No Comment"), released later by Lost Vinyl in 1996. Also of note are his participation at the prestigious International Festival of the Guitar in Cordova, a Festival in Italy where he played next to Nacho Duato, and Encuentros de Nueva ("New Meetings") together with Wim Mertens. In 1995 Gualberto participated in a new series of concerts, in which he worked with diverse instruments upon prerecorded bases, combining different styles and tendencies. In 1998 he recorded "Resistances" with Ricardo Miño, and in 2000 he recorded the critically acclaimed "Contrastes" ("Contrasts," or "With Frets", as the name has a double meaning in Spanish) along with Ricardo Miño and several other artists.

At this day, he combines his music investigation and studio work with live shows, as well as lectures and conferences at universities and cultural centres.

== See also ==
- New Flamenco
- Flamenco rumba
