= Certamen de Guitarra flamenca =

Spanish Flamenco music competition

Certamen de Guitarra flamenca is a flamenco guitar competition held Spain since 1986 to "the most impressive players of flamenco guitar". Previous winners include Pedro Javier González and Antonio Rey. The 2004 competition was held in the second week of December at the Teatro Villamarta in Jerez de la Frontera and the 2010 competition was held on 13-15 October 2010.
