= Nunca el Tiempo es Perdido =

Nunca el Tiempo es Perdido or Nunca el Tiempo

Studio album by Manolo Garcia
- Released: May 14, 2001
- Genre: Latin, rock
- Label: Ariola
- Producer: Manolo Garcia

Manolo Garcia chronology
Arena en los Bolsillos (1998)	''Nunca el Tiempo es Perdido or Nunca el Tiempo'' (2001)	Para Que No Se Duerman Mis Sentidos (2004)

Professional ratings
Review scores
Source	Rating
AllMusic	Not rated link

Nunca el Tiempo es Perdido is the second solo studio album from Spanish musician Manolo García, formerly of the band El Último de la Fila.

== Track listing ==
1. "Sin Que Sepas de mi" – 5:16
2. "Suave, Suave" – 3:58
3. "Rosa de Alejandria" – 4:35
4. "Somos Levedad" – 5:00
5. "Con los Hombres Azules" – 4:50
6. "Vendran Dias" – 4:49
7. "Mientras Observo al Afilador" – 6:16
8. "Nunca el Tiempo es Perdido" – 4:28
9. "Por Respirar" – 4:43
10. "Alegre como una Mosca Ante un Pastel de Bodas" – 4:55
11. "Prendi la Flor" – 3:59
12. "En los Desiertos Por Habitar" – 3:11
13. "Alegre como una Mosca Ante un Pastel de Bodas (fragmento) – 0:37
14. "Un Plan" – 5:04

== Certifications ==
Region	Certification	Certified units/sales
Spain (Promusicae)	4× Platinum	400,000^{^}
^{^} Shipments figures based on certification alone.
