= Mezquita (band) =

Spanish rock band

- Origin: Spain
- Genres: Progressive rock Spanish rock Flamenco-rock; Andalusian rock
- Past members: Jose Rafael Garcia (guitar and vocals); Randy Lopez (bass, percussion and vocals); Rosca Lopez (keyboards and vocals); Rafael Zorilla (drums and vocals)

Mezquita was a Spanish rock band that formed in 1978 and disbanded in 1983.

== Discography ==
=== Albums ===
- Recuerdos de mi tierra (1979)
- Califas del rock (1981)

=== Singles ===
- Desde que Somos Dos / Ara Buza (1979)
- Recuerdos de mi Tierra / El Bizco de los Patios (1980)
- Así soy yo / Mente de mi Subconsciente (1981)
- Resaca del Amanecer / Así soy yo (1981)
