= Cuban rock =

Cuban music genre

Rock and roll music was introduced in Cuba in the late 1950s, with many Cuban artists of the time covering American songs translated into Spanish, as was occurring in Mexico at the same time. "The Batista police never looked kindly on Rock and Roll, and much less after the screening of films like Rebel Without a Cause and The Bad Seed, among others. After 1959, Rock and Roll followed the same path, although artists like Argentinean Luis Aguile emerged."

When Cuba and the United States broke relations, some people considered rock "the music of the enemy, the language of the enemy". Then, there was the time of the Cold War, the Bay of Pigs, the Cuban Missile Crisis and the uprising of armed bands throughout the country. Nevertheless, rock continued to be played. And though it didn't have a good reputation, it was tolerated. And though somehow its performers were considered to have a deviant ideology, many groups continued playing the genre. Among these were included Los Vampiros and Los Satélites. These bands were composed of black people and had a style similar to that of Limbo Rock in the United States. This was the origin of street rock. And the situation continued like that until 1965.

Salvador Terry's Los Vampiros and Los Satélites helped keep Cuban rock alive and showed that black and mixed race people also loved it. From 1961 to 1964, they made people put aside the old quarrels and misunderstandings that rock was the music of high life of the white majority.

Today, all the manifestations and subgenres of rock are performed in the underground environment are interpreted, no matter how atypical they are.

== History of rock in Cuba ==
=== The 1950s ===
The strong influence of American music on the younger Cuban generations paved the way for the introduction of rock & roll in the island during the 1950s. Many Cuban artists sung versions of American songs translated to Spanish, as it was also happening in Mexico.

One of the first Cuban rock groups, Los Llopis pioneered the use of the electric guitar in Cuba, although electrically-amplified treses were already being played by musicians such as Senén Suárez. The repertoire of Los Llopis consisted of a combination of American and rock pieces, such as "See You Later, Alligator" and "Rock Around the Clock" by the Bill Haley group, with other Cuban and Hispanic pieces like "Goza mi Guaracha", "Maquinolandera" and "La pollera colorá". Los Llopis also succeeded in Spain, where they established their residence for some years and introduced pachanga, a new Cuban rhythm with an influence from the Dominican merengue.

In 1959 Luisito Bravo bursted into the Cuban musical scene with songs such as Neil Sedaka's "Oh Carol" and the Italian song "Tiernamente (Torna a Surriento)" (covered by Elvis Presley as "Surrender", reaching 500,000 record sales by 1961. Other solo artists followed Luisito Bravo, such as Rogelio Sanzarini and Jorge Bauer, as well as groups such as the Satélites of Antonio María Romeu and the Tony Taño band.

=== The 1960s ===
The development of Cuban rock was interrupted by the Cuban Revolution. Fidel Castro banned rock music in 1961, for being a corrupt North American influence that didn't belong in the new communist Cuba; a position that ironically was in contradiction with the own liberal vision of Karl Marx with respect to the arts and culture; not to mention that the international rock groups had embraced in general a leftist ideology by then.

Despite this, several rock artists emerged that year. Dany Puga, called the King of Twist, and bands such as Los Diablos Melódicos and Los Enfermos del Rock, as well as Los Halcones of IvanFariñas and Los Huracanes from Marianao. The vocal quartet Los Zafiros was another successful group from the beginning of the sixties. Founded in 1961, it was influenced by the doo-wop style of The Platters, The Diamonds and other American groups, and counted on a repertoire consisting of ballads, calypsos and bossanovas, as well as songs with slow rock and bolero rhythms. One of the most salient traits of the group was the treble voice of the counter-tenor Ignacio Elejalde, supported by Miguel Cancio, Leoncio Morúa and Eduardo Elio Hernández (El chino), as well as by the guitarist Manuel Galbán. The guitarist Franco Laganá, an Italian musician that had participated in the renowned group of Renato Carosone, was an early representative of the music with an American influence in Cuba, during the beginning of the sixties decade.

At that time, the popular group Los Astros (not to be confused with René Álvarez' band), led by the singer and guitarist Raúl Gómez, was threatened by pressures exerted by the Fidel Castro regime over the rock groups, which were considered as a form of "ideological diversionism" and actively opposed in all its manifestations. Its style, strongly influenced by British Invasion groups like the Beatles and the Rolling Stones, was labelled as "deviant" and consequently repressed without any hesitation. Since then, the Revolutionary government of Cuba began to implement an absolute control over all aspects of the Cuban society, including, of course, all cultural expressions. In 1963, Fidel himself delivered a speech at the steps in front of the Havana University, which clearly expressed his contempt and dissatisfaction toward certain manifestations influenced by foreign trends, such as the Elvis Presley ("elvispresliana") music, the tight blue jeans (pitusas), and also homosexuality; thus establishing the official parameters from the regime on that subject:

"... Many of those lazy tramps (pepillos), sons of the bourgeoisie, that roam around with pants that are too tight (laughter); some of them with a guitar in "elvispreslianas" (from Elvis Presley) attitudes, that have gone too far on its venture as to go to public places with the intention of freely organizing their feminine shows.

Do not mistake the serenity of the Revolution and the equanimity of the Revolution for weaknesses of the Revolution. Because our society cannot allow these degenerations (applause). The socialist society cannot allow these degenerations. Youngsters seeking that? No! "crooked grown trees...", the remedy is not that easy. I am not going to say that we are going to apply radical measures against those crooked trees, but aspiring youngsters, no!

There are some theories, I am not a scientist, I am not an expert on this subject (laughter), but I have always observed something: that the countryside didn't give such a subproduct. I have always observed that, and I always keep it in mind.

I am sure that independently from any theory and any investigations in the field of medicine, I understand that there is much related to the environment, much related to the environment and some softening, in this problem. But all of them are related, the hooligan, the tramp, the "elvispresliano", the "pitusa" (tight blue jean) (laughter)."

Los Astros followed the classical format coined by the British groups: Raúl Gómez, leading voice and rhythm guitar, his cousin Luis Gómez, second voice and lead guitar, Marcelo, accompanying voice and sax, and Gerardo López, drums. Its repertoire consisted of American hits from the sixties. During its short existence, the group had to confront numerous adversities and a hostile environment. Eres como el Fuego (You are like fire), their first song broadcast by a radio station in the capital city, was recorded with great difficulties, and therefore the result was of very little audio quality. Los Astros used to play in the radio program Buenas Tardes Juventud, from Radio Marianao. According to Jorge Luis González Suárez: "Those shows also suffered the regime's ban for being considered a form of 'ideological diversion'."

In spite of the political discrepancy between the US and Cuba since 1960; after the closing of the US embassy, and after the country being "invaded from the neighbor at the North" by Cubans opposed to the socialist regime, rock music never stopped to be performed, despite being considered as subversive. After the disintegration of some rock bands, their members formed new ones, as in the case of Los Halcones in the Quinteto Negro, and the Príncipes del Rock in Los Buitres, consisting of Rey Montesinos, Dino Fregio, vocals and guitar and Jorge Calvet Vidales (Coqui), guitarist and leader of the "Orquesta 440".

Already in 1964, other bands imitating the Beatles emerged, such as Los Kent, Los Pacíficos from the Pre-Universitario del Vedado; and then many amateur bands, creating what was called (street rock) "rock de la calle". That way Los Violentos of Reynaldo Montesinos was created. That group was part of the psychedelic show of Maricusa Cabrera and Arístides Pumariega (a famous cartoonist from the Cuban TV and press). In 1969, Los Violentos brought to the group Miguelito and Aimé Cabrera, two singer-dancers of very high artistic quality, thus providing a different image to the audience of the Maricusa Cabrera shows.

Although its members were considered as ideological deviants, many groups continued cultivating this genre. We can include among them Los Vampiros and Los Satélites. Those groups led by Salvador Terry contributed to keep Cuban rock alive and demonstrated that it was appreciated by people from different races. Between 1961 and 1964, they were able to make people leave behind their old misunderstandings, created by those who thought that rock was the music of the high classes and the white majority. These bands were composed of black people and possessed a style similar to the Limbo Rock from the US. That was the origin of "street rock" and it continued until 1965.

Around 1965, the Cuban government implemented a strategy to substitute the foreign products that the young people preferred, with others that better matched their official guidelines; and as a result of this strategy, a new radio program called Nocturno was broadcast in 1966, which initial musical theme was "La chica de la valija" (Girl with a suitcase) from the Italian sax player Fausto Papetti. The program presented modern songs, giving priority to the European repertoire in Spanish language of soloists and groups such as Los Mustang, Los Bravos, Los Brincos, Juan y Junior, Rita Pavone, Massiel, Nino Bravo, Leonardo Fabio, Salvatore Adamo and Raphael, and some Cuban groups as Los Zafiros and Los Dan. The ban against rock music was lifted in 1966, but rock fans continued to be marginalized by the communist establishment, and watched over with suspicion as "counter-revolutionaries".

When the ban was lifted, Los Pacíficos planned to offer a rock concert. They borrowed their instruments and played without a previous rehearsal. The two full hours long concert was recorded. Los Pacíficos paid a high price for their performance, because one of its members, Carlos Avila, was killed in the Angolan war during the sixties. The recording was smuggled out of Cuba during the nineties and published as a remastered album. The Pacíficos won an entry in the John Lennon Songwriting Contest in New York.

The Castro government's attitude towards rock, until recently, was quite negative, although it has varied greatly in severity throughout the regime's existence. During the 1960s and 1970s rock was prohibited, although nueva cancion/nueva trova artists like Silvio Rodríguez and Carlos Varela would sometimes perform rock material. In more recent years, with the re-transition to a tourism-based economy, attitudes of the Castro regime towards rock have softened somewhat, not only towards domestic and Latin American artists but also towards foreign Anglophone artists. Independent the very trouble Quinteto Negro of Ivan Fariñas and Carlos Cory improvised concerts together with The Zafiros and quartet of Meme Solis in Carpas Teatros, other bands as Los Buitres with plays version about music of The Beatles and The Dave Clark Five also played in Carpas. In 1968 other cover bands started such as Dimension Vertical with Oscar Quesada, last drummer of Quinteto Negro and many others; for example Los Kent and Jets in the Vedado Zone.

=== The 1970s ===
Rock music began to be heard in Havana during the seventies, in a radio program from Radio Marianao called Buenas Tardes Juventud. That program presented groups such as the Rolling Stones, the Beatles, Dave Clark Five, The Animals, Grand Funk, Rare Earth, Led Zeppelin, Jimi Hendrix, Elvis Presley, Neil Sedaka and Paul Anka. At the beginning of the eighties, that radio station joined Radio Ciudad de La Habana.

Near to the end of the 1970s, guitarist and singer Jorge Martínez created RED, a heavy metal band, in Municipio Playa, and presented his own music mixed with covers. This band put some hits on the radio like Murcielagos, Mako, La nueva historia and Burocracia. Also on TV, the band was co-founder of the legendary "Patio de María" in the late 1980s, and it was active until 1990.

In 1979, a three-day music festival called Havana Jam '79 took place at the Karl Marx Theater, in Havana, Cuba, where a group of rock artists that included Billy Joel and Stephen Stills performed.

=== The 1980s and 90s ===
In the 1980s, a heavy metal band called Venus was formed by Roberto Armada in Playa, Havana. During the 1980s, at the height of rock and heavy metal in Cuba, Roberto Armada founded the band Venus in the municipality of Playa, Havana, one of the pioneering groups of the genre on the island. In a context of government restrictions on rock, Venus managed to stand out within the underground movement thanks to its powerful sound and its ability to connect with a youth eager for new cultural expressions.

With an approach influenced by the classic heavy metal of bands like Black Sabbath, Judas Priest, and Iron Maiden, Venus became one of the most popular groups within the Cuban alternative scene. Their live performances, marked by the high energy and passion of their members, attracted a growing following, despite the difficulties in obtaining equipment and venues.

However, the band's success and growing popularity also caught the attention of the cultural authorities of the time, who viewed rock as a foreign influence that ran counter to the official values of the establishment. In this context of censorship and repression against the rock movement, Venus was forced to disband, joining the list of bands that faced bans and restrictions during those years. Punk rock was introduced in Cuba in the late 1980s and generated a cult following among its followers, comprising a minority of the youth audience.

On the other hand, Punk rock was introduced in Cuba in the late 1980s and gained a cult-type following among a minority of the youth. In 1982 Nilo Núñez formed the rock band called Rhodas in Camagüey. The band had a huge following as well as a number one hit with "Es Amor". Rhodas were active in Cuba until 1996 when they left Cuba for Spain. See A través de los obstáculos by Nilo Núñez and Parche: Enciclopedia del Rock en Cuba by Humberto Manduley.

During the nineties, rock and roll in Cuba was still an underground phenomenon. In Havana, the Ciudad de La Habana radio station presented several programs showing the most recent tendencies on that type of music around the world. Juan Camacho, an old musician and radio host had a morning program called Disco Ciudad. El programa de Ramón was also a successful radio show. Some bands from that period were: Gens, Zeus and Los Tarsons. Despite being perceived as a small underground scene due to official disapproval by the state, Cuban rock since the late 1990s has become a larger phenomenon, with groups such as Burbles, Moneda Dura and Los Kent with Jorge Martínez gaining a new dimension with their guitar performance, more polished sound and musical lead, which broadened their audience. These bands performed rock music on Cuban TV, as well as in concerts and festivals; and since then, the profile of rock music has risen in the island.

=== The 21st century ===
The sleeve for the Manic Street Preachers single "The Masses Against the Classes" featured an amended version of the Cuban flag

In 2001, the Welsh group Manic Street Preachers was invited to perform in Cuba, and Fidel Castro attended its concert along with other government authorities. In 2004, Castro gave a speech honoring the Birthday of John Lennon, whose music, as a member of the Beatles and as a soloist was banned in Cuba for a very long time. In 2000, a bronze statue of Lennon was placed in a well known Havana park, which is now known as John Lennon Park.

At the same time that the government was showing a more indulgent attitude toward the foreign rock groups, as part of an international campaign which purpose was to achieve an opening in the commercial transactions and investments of the US and Europe in Cuba, it continued to implement an inflexible repression against any form of internal dissidence. This was the case of the rocker Gorki Águila and his group Porno para Ricardo. In August 2008, Águila was arrested under charges of dangerousness, a law that allows the authorities to detain people whom they think are likely to commit crimes; even when they have not yet committed them.

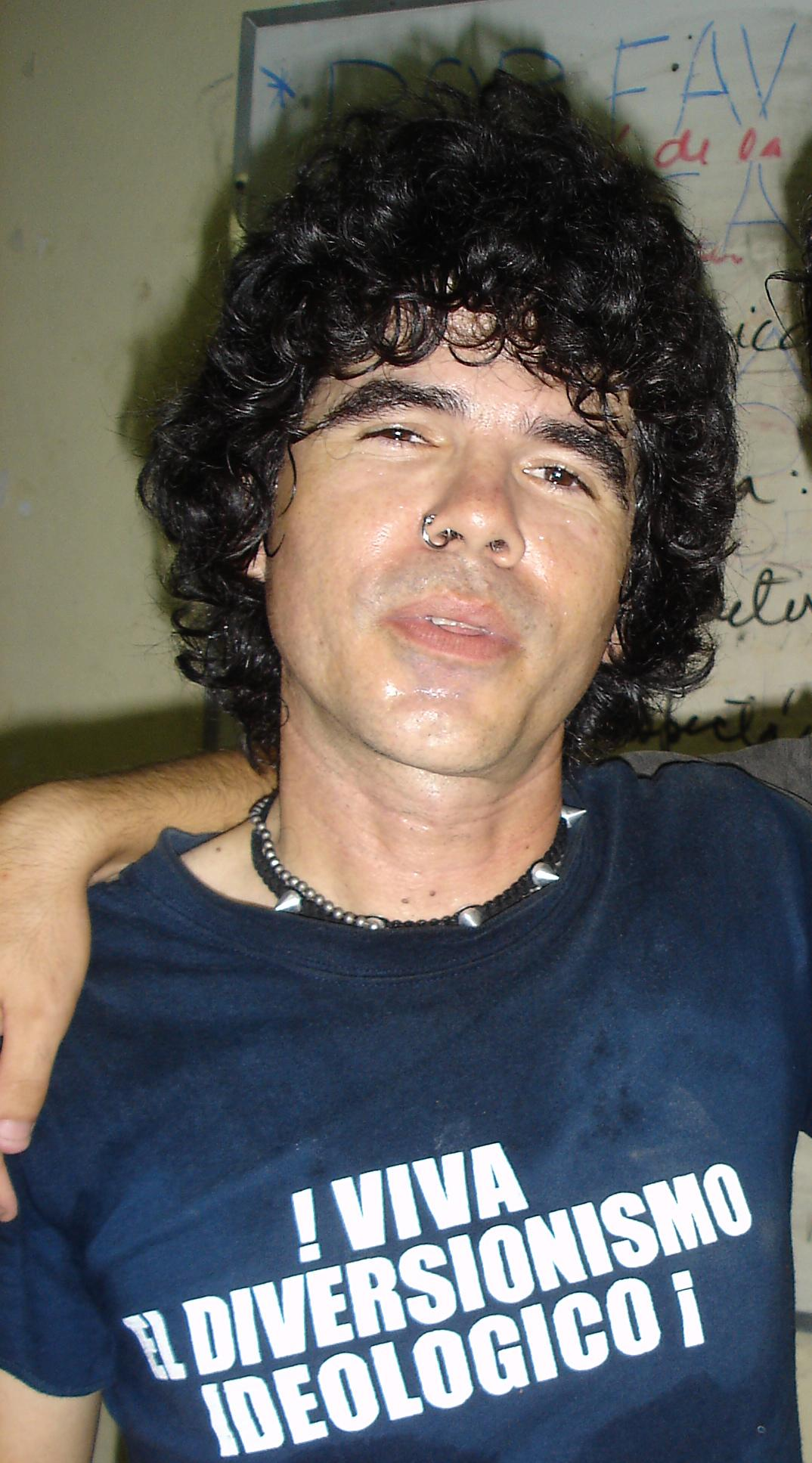
Gorki Águila, leader of the Cuban rock band Porno para Ricardo

More recently, Rick Wakeman, Sepultura and Audioslave performed in Havana, and The Rolling Stones offered a historic concert that has become the most outstanding rock event since the beginning of the Revolutionary period in 1959. Their concert was commemorated in the film Havana Moon.

A new phenomenon occurred in 2013 when several Cuban underground metal bands begin to emigrate to the United States, creating a parallel scene with the bands Agonizer, Escape, Ancestor, Hipnosis, Suffering Tool and Chlover.

== Rock festivals in Cuba ==
Several rock festivals have taken place throughout Cuba.

- Festival Ciudad-Metal (Santa Clara)
- Festival Caiman Rock de Ciudad de La Habana (Havana)
- Festival Ciudad Junto al Mar (Cienfuegos)
- Festival Rockasol (Cienfuegos)
- Festival Metal HG (Holguín)
- Festival Rock de la Loma (Bayamo)
- Festival Pinar-Fest (Pinar del Río)
- Festival Rey Metal (Pinar del Río)
- Festival Atenas Rock (Matanzas)
- Festín de Zeus (Havana)
- Festival Rock del Río (San Antonio de los Baños, Havana)
- 6.6.6 FEST (Havana)
- Brutal Fest (Havana)

== See also ==
- Music of Cuba
