= Xavier Coll =

Spanish classical guitarist

Xavier Coll is a Spanish classical guitarist. In the year 1989, he formed the classical, flute-guitar duo with Montserrat Gascón. He also played in a group with Pedro Javier González, Yoshimi Otani and Alex Garrobé. He has most recently performed with the Barcelona Guitar Trio, along with Luis Robisco and Manuel Gonzalez.
