= Feliu Gasull =

Spanish flamenco guitarist and composer (born 1959)

Feliu Gasull (born 1959 in Barcelona) is a Spanish flamenco guitarist and composer.

He studied guitar at the Geneva Conservatory of Music and composition at Indiana University Bloomington with a master of music (composition) in 1988. In 1988 he won the Carmichael Competition and collaborated with Pedro Javier González in late 1980s. He has been part of several ensembles, including the New Music Ensemble. In 2007 he released the album L'Ull. His style combines flamenco and classical music, especially chamber music.
