= David Meza (journalist) =

Honduran radio journalist

David Meza Montesinos (1959 – March 11, 2010) was a Honduran radio journalist. He reported for the El Patio radio station for more than 30 years before his murder in 2010. Meza was also a general assignment correspondent for the Radio America national broadcaster.

Meza, who investigated drug trafficking within Honduras, reportedly received death threats in 2010, according to the El Tiempo newspaper. Meza was shot and killed at approximately 5:30 p.m. on March 11, 2010, while driving near his home in the northern Honduran city of La Ceiba. The shots, which were fired from another vehicle, caused Meza's car to crash into a house. He was 51 years old. His funeral, which was attended by thousands of people, was held in La Ceiba.

The La Tribuna paid tribute to Meza, calling him a "journalist of the people." Meza was one of five Honduran journalists to be killed in the country during March 2010.
