= Premio al Toque por Bulerías =

Premio al Toque por Bulerías is an annual prize given in Spain to the most impressive players of the Bulerías, a style of flamenco. Previous winners in the 1980s include Pedro Javier González and Pepe Justicia (1987).
