= Enemigos de lo ajeno =

Enemigos de lo Ajeno

Studio album by El Último de la Fila
- Released: 1986
- Genre: Rock

El Último de la Fila chronology
Cuando la pobreza entra por la puerta, el amor salta por la ventana (1985)	Enemigos de lo Ajeno (1986)	Nuevas mezclas (1987)

Enemigos de lo Ajeno is a 1986 rock album by the Spanish band El Último de la Fila. Rolling Stone magazine (Spain Edition) voted this album as Spain's most important rock album of all time. Rock DeLux Magazine (Spain's most important rock printed Magazine) and other prestigious critics have voted this album either as the most important or within the top 100 most significant Spanish-language rock albums.

The original version of the album was recorded with a very limited budget in Barcelona on an indie label called PDI. A year later, some of the tracks were re-recorded and remixed in London and re-released on an album called "Nuevas Mezclas". Enemigos De Lo Ajeno album eventually became part of the catalog of EMI. Originally it achieved Gold status (50000 units), but over the years it has sold in excess of, 200000 (double platinum). CD reissues have appeared with different mastering over the years.
