= Burbles =

Cuban rock band

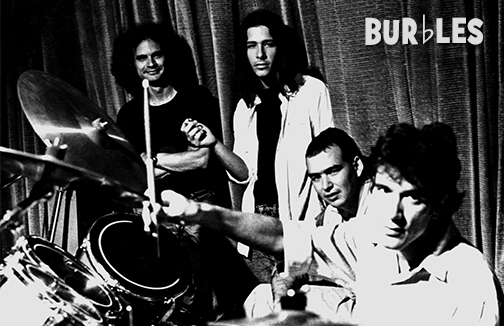
- Burbles in 1995; Top: Raúl Barroso, Abraham Alcover; Bottom: Osmel Prado, Carlos Cobas

Background information
- Origin: Ciudad de la Habana, Cuba
- Genres: Rock, Pop
- Years active: 1982-1996
- Labels: EGREM; Radio Progreso
- Past members: Principal; Carlos Cobas; Raúl Barroso; Abraham Alcover; Osmel Prado; Other; Miguel Angel Méndez; Alejandro López

Burbles was a Cuban rock band in the early 1990s. The band, formed mainly by Carlos Cobas and Raul Barroso, had a significant success among the rock bands in Cuba. "Canción por los Perros" (Song for Dogs), "Soy como no quiero" (I don't like myself), “La alegría del mundo" (The joy of the world), "Gaviotas en el mar" (Gulls on the sea), among others, were some of its most popular songs.

The band was formed originally in 1982 at the University of Havana, with Raul Barroso (vocals, bass), Carlos Cobas (vocals, rhythm guitar, harmonica), Miguel Angel Mendez (lead guitar) and Alejandro Lopez (drums), although at that time also had other members, such as Julio Rojas (guitar) and drummers Rodolfo Cala, Erick Pi and Leopoldo Alvarez. In January 1985 lead guitarist Méndez goes to “Eclipse” and a long period of silence follows, although the binomial Cobas/Barroso is still active. Burbles returned in early 1994 with Abraham Alcover (guitar, ex-Cuatro Gatos) and Edgardo “Yayo” Serka (drums). Then cut a record that included "Canción por los Perros" (Song for Dogs). This song had a controversial paper in the public media of the country due to the social criticism that was docking. In the same year the group produced three musical videos for the national television, including the "Song for the Dogs". In January 1995 the band debuts at the National Guignol Theater ensuing new changes: Drummers Osmel Prado and Carlos Alberto Estevez are used until the end of that year. In 1996 the band began working with Carlos Rodriguez Obaya (drums, ex-Los Gens), with whom the second album is recorded "Gaviotas en el mar" (Gulls in the sea) and the "Año Bisiesto" (Leap Year) album, with contributions from Dagoberto Pedraja. The group line could be described as Pop-Rock: own material sung in Spanish. After recording the album, the band recesses all activity.

== Recorded Songs ==
1983

- New journey
- Is for you (It's for you)
- Maybe I think
- I have reason
- Philadelphia rock
- Quisiera olvidarte
- Cuídese Sr!
- De vez en cuando
- Tu estás perdiendo su amor
- Yo espero
- Tu pequeño mundo
- Por quien más sufría

1991

- Tengo razón
- La alondra
- Cotidiana delgadez
- A esta muchacha

1993

- Tengo razón
- Aurora
- La alondra
- Nunca mas podrás reir
- Alguien en el tiempo
- Qué ganas tengo de ser feliz
- Hipertensión
- Color de ti
- La balanza
- Jimena
- Extrañándote
- Verte nada mas
- Fantasía
- Gloria

1994

- Canción por los perros
- La alegría del mundo
- Suerte de Minotauro
- Borrador
- El Laberinto
- Mareas de amor
- Qué pasa
- Tarambán

1995

- Hey Muchacho (La rutina)
- Mareas de amor (a todo blues)
- Romanza a la oscuridad
- Soy como no quiero
- A otra parte con mi música

1996 - Año Bisiesto

- Gaviotas en el mar
- Mate con torre y arfil
- Doce (12)
- Romanza en la oscuridad
- Mr. Mito
- Canción por los perros - Gaviotas (coda)
- Suerte de Minotauro
- Paren el mundo
- Bola de cristal
- Iscariote 1966
- Azul profundo
- Ternura en sol mayor

2002

- Amada Habana
- Ayúdame John
