= Manolo García =

Spanish singer and painter

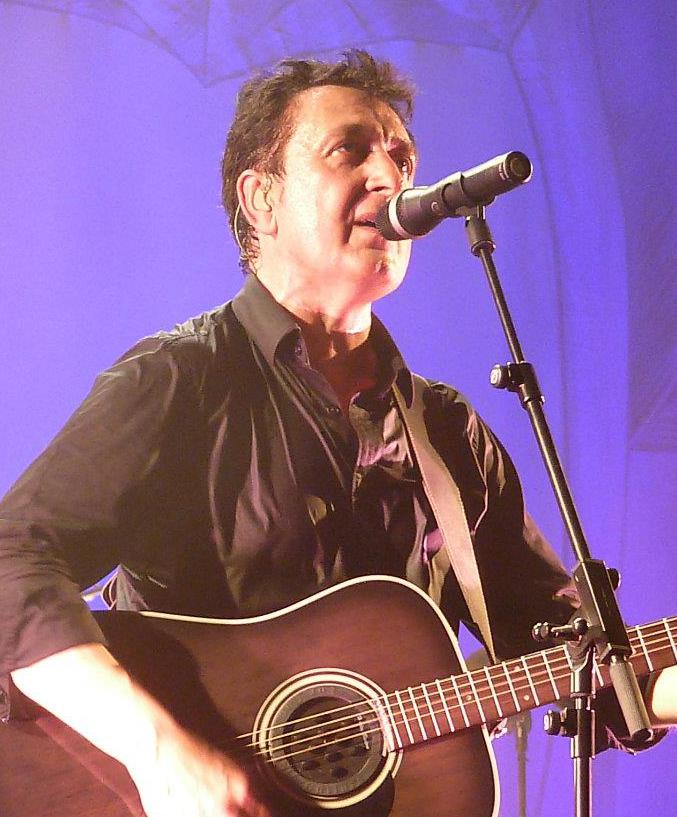
Manolo García performing in 2012

Manuel García García-Pérez (*Poblenou, Barcelona, is a Spanish singer and painter. His first LPs were recorded with the rock bands Los Rápidos, Los Burros and El Último de la Fila. His singing style is a mixture of pop rock, flamenco and Arabic music. Today, García continues to have a successful solo career.

Manolo became famous as the frontman of the Rock group "El Último de La Fila" (The Last In Line), during the eighties and nineties. His fanbase extends not only to Spain but to most of Latin America and Spanish speakers in the USA. Manolo is an example of an integral artist in Spain and Spanish speaking America.

== Albums ==
- Arena en los Bolsillos (BMG, 1998)
- Nunca el Tiempo es Perdido (BMG, 2001)
- Para que no se duerman mis sentidos (BMG, 2004)
- Saldremos a la lluvia (BMG, 2008)
- Los días intactos (BMG, 2011)
- Todo es ahora (BMG, 2014)
- Geometría del rayo (Sony, 2018)
- Acústico acústico acústico (En directo) (Sony, 2020)
- Mi Vida en Marte (Sony, 2022)
- Desatinos desplumados (Sony, 2022)
- Drapaires Poligoneros (Sony, 2025)
