= Pata Negra =

Spanish flamenco-blues band

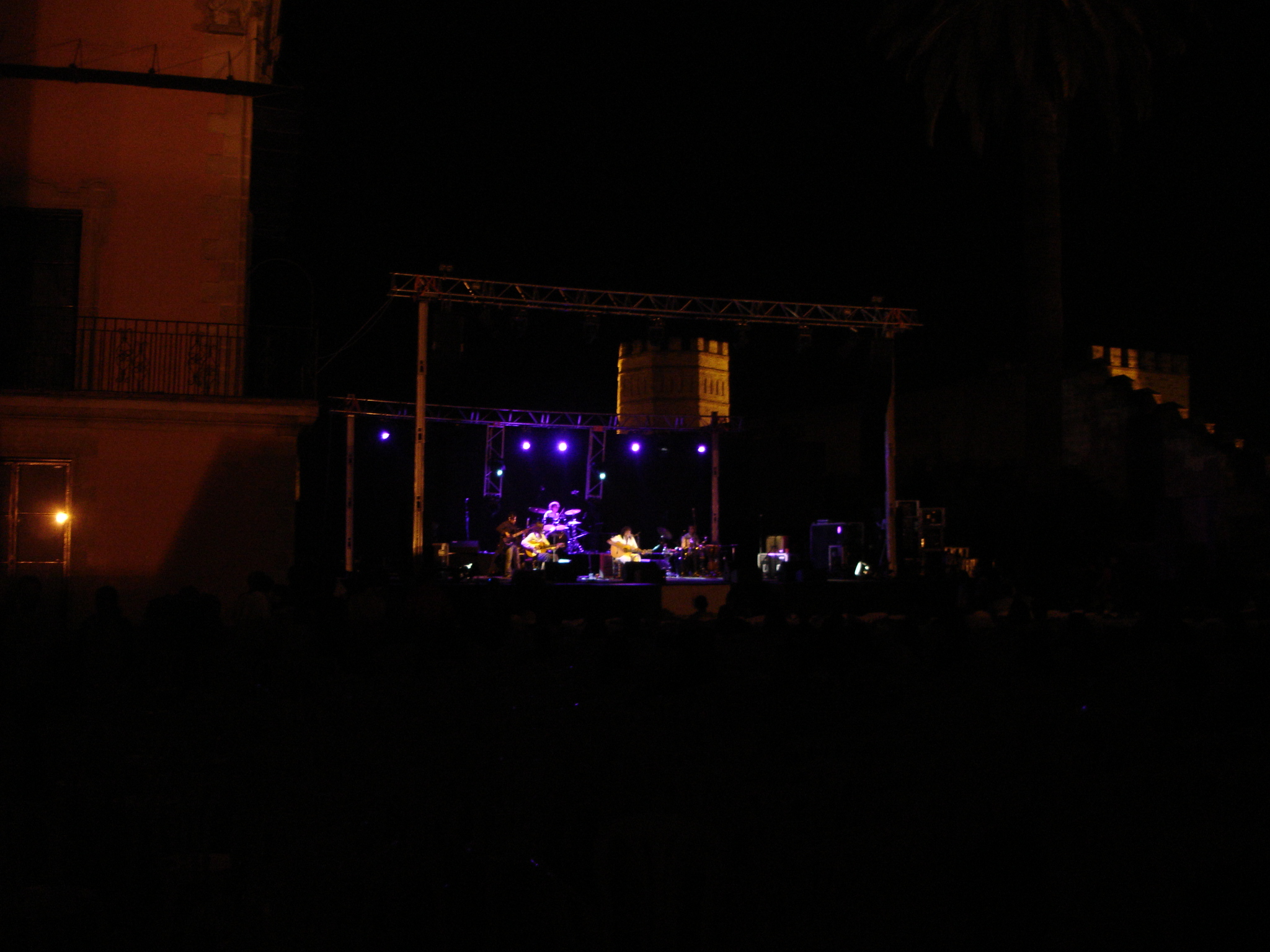
Pata Negra playing at the Alcázar of Jerez de la Frontera

Pata Negra is a Spanish flamenco-blues band, established by brothers Raimundo Amador (singer and guitarist, b. 1959 in Seville) and Rafael Amador (guitarist and cantaor, b. 1960 in Seville) after the breakup of their previous band Veneno. Their style of derivative rhythms based on flamenco nuevo and blues, which they titled "blueslería" (a word play with the flamenco musical form bulería), made an impact on other modern flamenco music bands. The Amador brothers, as Pata Negra, recorded five records between 1978 and 1989.

== Discography ==
Albums

- Pata Negra, 1981
- Rock Gitano I, 1982
- Guitarras callejeras, 1985
- Blues de la Frontera, 1986
- Inspiración y locura, 1990
- El directo (Live), 1994
- Como una vara verde, 1994

Other compilations

- Rock Gitano (Nuevas Mezclas)
- Best of Pata Negra, 1998
- Pata Negra, 2002
