= Tomasito =

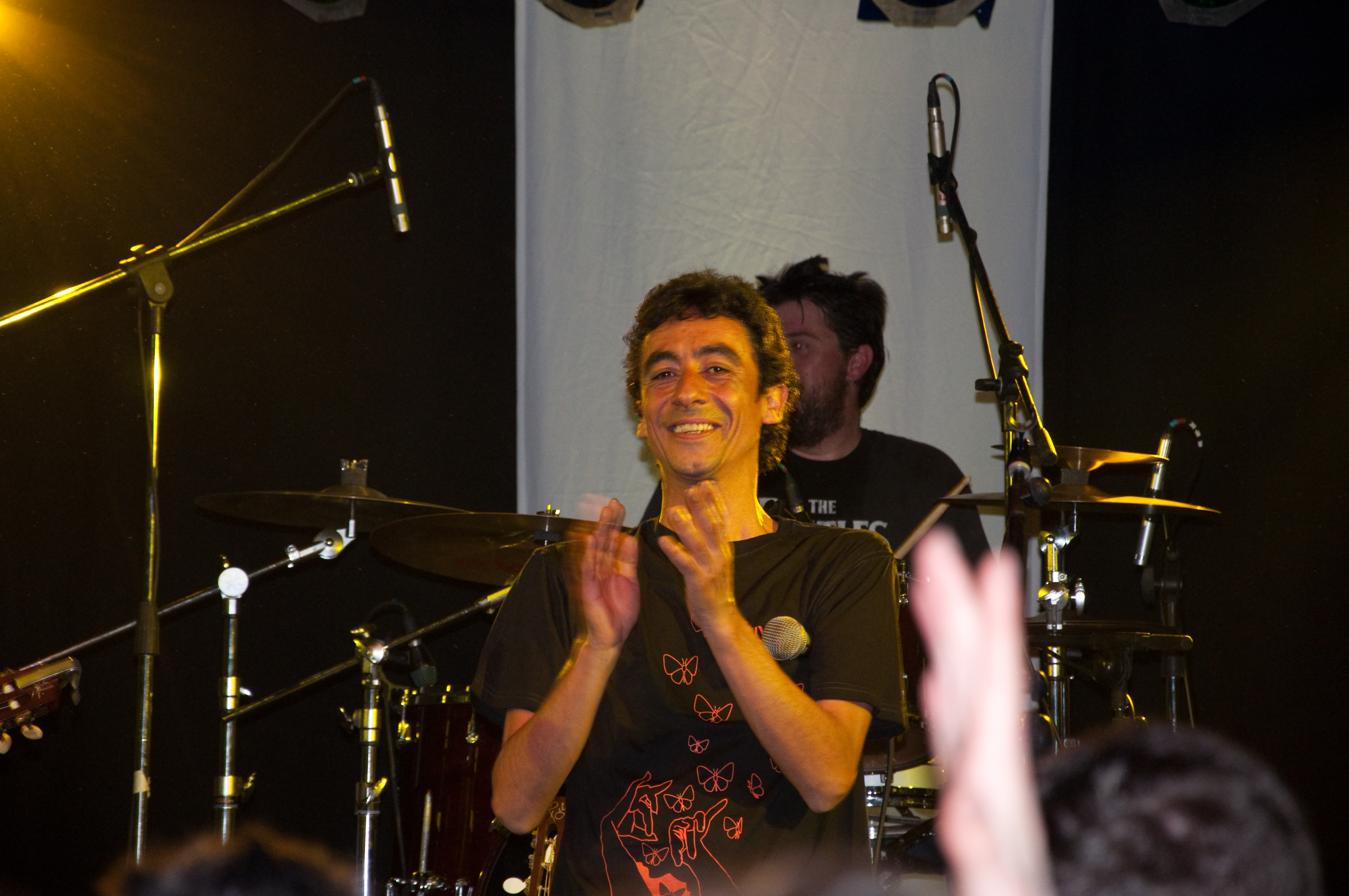
Tomás Moreno Romero

Tomás Moreno Romero, better known as Tomasito, is a Spanish flamenco dancer, singer and rapper born in Jerez de la Frontera, Spain, in 1969. His music style is a very personal mixture of flamenco, pop, rock, hip hop, funky, and other rhythms. He is the son of Bastiana, also flamencodancer.

== Albums ==
Some of his albums are:

- Torrotrón
- Tomasito
- Castaña
- Cositas de la realidad
- Y de lo mío ¿qué?

== Collaborations ==
He has recorded songs with Kiko Veneno, Muchachito Bombo Infierno y Los Delinqüentes, Pastora Soler, Rosendo and Raimundo Amador among others.
