= Ricardo Pachón =

Music producer, arranger and composer (1937–2026)

Ricardo Pachón Capitán
- Born: 1937; Seville, Spain
- Died: 19 August 2026 (aged 88) Seville, Spain
- Occupations: Music producer; arranger; composer

Ricardo Pachón Capitán (1937 – 19 August 2026) was a Spanish music producer, arranger and composer. Regarded as arguably the most influential producer in the history of new flamenco and modern flamenco, he produced albums such as La leyenda del tiempo, the first three LPs by Lole y Manuel, and the debut album by Kiko Veneno. He also directed numerous music-related documentaries.

== Life and career ==
Ricardo Pachón dedicated his life to flamenco, working as a producer, curator and archivist of traditional song recordings. He held a Law degree from the University of Seville. He worked in the Culture Department of the Seville Provincial Council, the Regional Government of Andalusia,and RTVE, where he produced mainly documentaries and programmes related to flamenco.

In the early 1970s, he started his career as a producer for the group Smash, persuading Manuel Molina to join and influencing the band to adopt the flamenco-influenced sound that would become characteristic of Andalusian rock. He also produced the debut album of the group Imán. However, he is best remembered for producing many of the most emblematic albums of 'New Flamenco', despite retiring from public service due to the limited commercial success of most of his productions. However, albums that were not widely appreciated at the time, such as La leyenda del tiempo, have since become major hits with both the public and critics.

Pachón was the director of the Flamenco Vivo label, which has specialised in producing flamenco recordings and audiovisual works for 50 years.

As a documentary filmmaker, he was best known for Triana pura y pura, which recounts the expulsion of the Romani people from Seville's Triana district and its impact on the essence of flamenco. The documentary was nominated for a Goya Award for Best Documentary Feature. He also contributed to the three-part Canal Sur TV series Camarón, el tiempo se hizo leyenda (2026).

Pachón died on 19 August 2026, at the age of 88.
