= Arena en los Bolsillos =

Studio album by Manolo Garcia
- Released: May 4, 1998
- Recorded: February–March 1998
- Genres: Latin, rock
- Length: 60:32
- Label: RCA International
- Producer: Manolo Garcia

Manolo Garcia chronology
| ''Arena en los Bolsillos'' (1998) | Nunca el Tiempo es Perdido (2001) |

Professional ratings
Review scores
| Source | Rating |
|---|---|
| Allmusic | 3/5 stars |

Arena en los bolsillos is the first solo studio album from Spanish musician Manolo García, released in 1998. The album contains 12 individual songs, plus an alternate version of the song "Carbón y ramas secas" and an instrumental version of the song "Pájaros de barro."

== Track listing ==
1. "Prefiero el trapecio" – 4:56
2. "Carbón y ramas secas" – 4:43
3. "Del bosque de tu alegria" – 4:30
4. "Pájaros de barro" – 4:06
5. "Sobre el oscuro abismo en que te meces" – 4:28
6. "A quien tanto he querido" – 3:44
7. "Como quien da un refresco" – 4:38
8. "Zapatero" – 4:56
9. "A San Fernando, un ratito a pie y otro caminando" – 3:47
10. "La llanura" – 3:25
11. "Viernes" – 3:37
12. "La sombra de una palmera" – 4:09
13. "Carbón y ramas secas (version 2) – 5:30
14. "Pájaros de barro (instrumental) – 4:04
