= Los Llopis =

Cuban musical group

Los Llopis was Cuban music quartet who were active in Cuba in 1950s and Spain in 1960s, and ended their career in the United States. The members were two brothers Manuel "Ñolo" Llopis and Francisco "Frank" LLopis, as well as Leandro Torres and Manolo Vega. The group is credited with the introduction of Spanish-language rock and roll ("rock en español") to Spain.

== Discography ==
- EP "Estremécete" (Zafiro Records, 1960).
- EP "Quito a poquito" (Zafiro, 1960).
- EP "La Puerta verde" (Zafiro, 1960).
- Los Llopis (Zafiro, 1961).
- Single "Siluetas" (Odeon Records, 1961).
- Single"Paseando bajo la lluvia" (Zafiro, 1961).
- EP "Basta Arturo" (Polydor, 1961).
- EP "Que siga la fiesta" (Polydor, 1961).
- EP "Al compás del reloj" (Polydor, 1962).
- CD "Los Llopis Serie Diamante" (Peerless/Warner Music Mexico, 2008)
- EP des-kontrol!!
