= El Último de la Fila =

Spanish rock band

- Origin: Barcelona
- Genre: Pop-rock
- Years active: 1984 – 1998
- Labels: PDI; EMI, Perro Records (Note: PDI from 1985 to 1990, then from 1990 to 1998 their record would be Perro Records distributed by EMI)
- Past members: Manolo García; Quimi Portet

El Último de la Fila is a successful Spanish rock group based in Barcelona, Spain. Formed in 1985 by Manolo García and Quimi Portet, the group released a total of 7 full-length albums before disbanding in early 1998. In 2025, the band announced that they would tour several Spanish cities in 2026.

Manolo García was the singer in a group called Los Rápidos (The Rapids) and Quimi Portet had created a group named Kul de Mandril (Mandrill Buttocks). They started playing together in Los Burros (The Donkeys) in 1984. Then around 1985 they decided to form El Último de la Fila, becoming one of the most successful Spanish groups of the 1980s and 1990s, touring throughout Spain and Latin America.

They were ranked number 1 on Rolling Stone's "50 Greatest Spanish rock bands".

== History ==
=== 1980s ===
In 1985, the two frontmen for the short-lived band, Los Burros ‒ Manolo García and Quimi Portet ‒ formed the group, El Último de la Fila (which means The Last in Line, inspired by the 1984 Dio song). After signing with independent music label, PDI, they released their first full-length album in February 1985 entitled Cuando la pobreza entra por la puerta, el amor salta por la ventana.

In 1986, the band released their follow-up album, Enemigos de lo ajeno, with the track, "Insurrección", being chosen as "Best Song of the Year" by Rock de Lux magazine. Enemigos de lo ajeno achieved the first Gold record, due to sales in excess of fifty thousand, for the band.

1987 saw the release of the group's third album, Nuevas mezclas ‒ recorded on a larger budget with improved sound quality ‒ followed by 1988's Como la cabeza al sombrero which sold more than 400,000 copies. The band began performing at larger and larger concert venues throughout Europe and South America, including the September 1988 Amnesty International Human Rights Now! concert in Barcelona, along with Bruce Springsteen, Sting, Peter Gabriel, Tracy Chapman, and Youssou N'Dour.

From 1988 to 1990, the group continued touring throughout Europe and the Americas including stops in Mexico, the United States, Colombia, Argentina, and Venezuela.

=== 1990s ===
In 1990, the band released their fifth album, Nuevo pequeño catálogo de seres y estares, which reached #1 on the AFYVE sales chart. The group also founded their own music company, Perro Records.

After another extensive tour throughout Spain, Europe, and South America, the group issued its sixth album, Astronomía razonable, in 1993 which became the first album by a Spanish group to stay at #1 on the AFYVE sales chart for 10 or more weeks. The disc also went gold in Venezuela and Mexico. The group promoted the album with a new international tour which included scenography designed by the Els Comediants theater group.

In 1995, the band released their seventh and final album, La rebelión de los hombres rana, and again toured internationally in collaboration with Els Comediants. The concerts included tracks from the group's entire history including songs from the Los Rápidos and Los Burros eras.

=== 1998 breakup ===
On 13 January 1998, El Último de la Fila announced their breakup so that the group's two founding members, Manolo García and Quimi Portet, would each separately pursue solo careers.

== Album discography ==
- Cuando la pobreza entra por la puerta, el amor salta por la ventana (February 1985)
  - 1. "Dulces sueños"
  - 2. "A cualquiera puede sucederle"
  - 3. "El Monte de las águilas"
  - 4. "El loco de la calle"
  - 5. "Cuando la pobreza entra por la puerta, el amor salta por la ventana"
  - 6. "Querida Milagros"
  - 7. "¿Hay alguien ahí?"
  - 8. "Otra vez en casa"
  - 9. "No hay dinero para los chicos"
  - 10. "Son cuatro dias"
- Enemigos de lo ajeno (April 1986)
  - 1. "Lejos de las leyes de los hombres"
  - 2. "Insurrección"
  - 3. "Mi patria en mis zapatos"
  - 4. "Aviones plateados"
  - 5. "Zorro veloz"
  - 6. "Las palabras son cansancio"
  - 7. "Soy un accidente"
  - 8. "Los ángeles no tienen hélices"
  - 9. "No me acostumbro"
  - 10. "¿Para qué sirve una hormiga?"
- Nuevas mezclas (February 1987)
  - 1. "El loco de la calle"
  - 2. "Aviones plateados"
  - 3. "Querida milagros"
  - 4. "Lejos de las leyes de los hombres"
  - 5. "¿Quién eres tú?"
  - 6. "Insurrección"
  - 7. "Son cuatro días"
  - 8. "No me acostumbro"
  - 9. "Soy un accidente"
  - 10. "Mi patria en mis zapatos"
  - 11. "Dulces sueños"
- Como la cabeza al sombrero (April 1988)
  - 1. "Dios de la lluvia"
  - 2. "Sara"
  - 3. "En los árboles"
  - 4. "La piedra redonda"
  - 5. "A veces se enciende"
  - 6. "Como la cabeza al sombrero"
  - 7. "Ya no danzo al son de los tambores"
  - 8. "Trabajo duro"
  - 9. "Trece planetas"
  - 10. "Llanto de pasión"
  - 11. "Otro verano" (instrumental) (CD bonus track)
  - 12. "Vamos" (instrumental) (CD bonus track)
- Nuevo pequeño catálogo de seres y estares (1990)
  - 1. "Grünfink o pinzón verde" (instrumental)
  - 2. "Músico loco"
  - 3. "Canta por mí"
  - 4. "Del templo a la taberna"
  - 5. "Andar hacia los pozos no quita la sed"
  - 6. "En mi pecho"
  - 7. "Beatus ille" (instrumental)
  - 8. "Cuando el mar te tenga"
  - 9. "A jazmín"
  - 10. "Barrio triste"
  - 11. "Sucedió en la antiguedad"
  - 12. "Todo el día llovió"
  - 13. Canción de cuna 823"
  - 14. "Cauterización de una herida" (instrumental) (CD bonus track)
  - 15. "The Blue Rabbits Machine Corporation Hymn" (instrumental) (CD bonus track)
- Astronomía razonable (1993)
  - 1. "El que canta su mal espanta"
  - 2. "Lápiz y tinta"
  - 3. "Remando sobre el polvo"
  - 4. "La risa tonta"
  - 5. "Hierbas de Asia"
  - 6. "Como un burro amarrado en la puerta del baile"
  - 7. "Astronomía razonable"
  - 8. "Piedra sobre piedra"
  - 9. "Vino dulce"
  - 10. "Mar antiguo"
  - 11. "Cosas que pasan"
  - 12. "Sumo y resto"
  - 13. "Hagámoslo"
  - 14. "Mar antiguo" (instrumental)
- La rebelión de los hombres rana (1995)
  - 1. "¡Qué bien huelen los pinos!"
  - 2. "Las hojas que ríen"
  - 3. "Vestido de hombre rana"
  - 4. "El bombero del atardecer"
  - 5. "Sin llaves"
  - 6. "Pedir tu mano"
  - 7. "Bailarás como un indio"
  - 8. "Dímelo tú"
  - 9. "A medio soñar"
  - 10. "Uva de la vieja parra"
  - 11. "Illetes" (instrumental)
- Desbarajuste Piramidal (double recopilatory album, 2023)
