= Triana (band) =

Spanish rock band

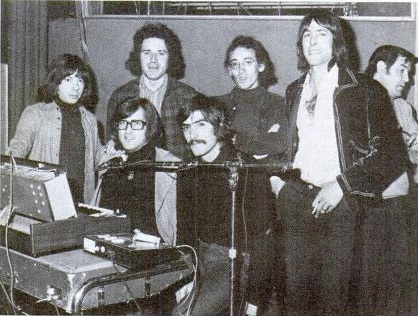
- Triana in the recording studio of their debut album. Tele (left), Jesús de la Rosa (mid, sitting) and Eduardo Rodríguez (right, smiling)

Background information
- Origin: Seville, Spain
- Genres: Flamenco rock; progressive rock
- Years active: 1974–1983, 1985, 1994–2002, 2007–present
- Label: Fonomusic
- Members: Juan Reina; Andrés Herrera; Raúl Fernández; Emilio Grueso; Santi Camps; Marco Gamero
- Past members: Jesús de la Rosa Luque; Eduardo Rodríguez Rodway; Juan José Palacios "Tele"

Triana is a rock band hailing from Seville, Spain. Formed in 1974, the band was known for blending elements of progressive rock and flamenco music to make a style known as Andalusian rock or flamenco rock.

== History ==
=== First lineup (1974–1983) ===
Triana was formed in 1974 as a trio consisting of vocalist and organist Jesús de la Rosa Luque, guitarist Eduardo Rodríguez Rodway, and drummer Juan José Palacios, better known as Tele. The band released its untitled debut album (nick-named El patio) the next year, presenting a sound that blended elements of Andalusian flamenco music with progressive and psychedelic rock. Although a commercial failure, the album earned the band a cult following among the Spanish youth who, following the belated fall of fascism in the country, were interested in the subversive themes of rock (especially psychedelic rock) presented in Triana's music. In 1977, Triana released their second album, Hijos del agobio. This album was a bigger commercial success than their debut and was notable for its politically involved lyrics which reflected the tense and unstable nature of Spain's political climate at the time. Their third album, Sombra y luz, was released in 1979. Their most experimental album to date, Sombra y luz contained elements of jazz and was certified platinum by the AFYVE.

In 1980, Triana released their fourth album, Un encuentro. A commercial success, the album demonstrated a much more commercial and pop rock-influenced sound. Its follow-up, 1981's Un mal sueño, featured a similar sound, as did their sixth album, 1983's Llegó el día. Shortly after the release of Llegó el día, de la Rosa Luque was killed in a car collision, and the band subsequently announced their break-up.

=== Interim (1984–1993) ===
In 1985, Rodway and Tele returned to the studio to create a final Triana album, taking vocal passages de la Rosa Luque recorded before his death and adding instrumentation. The resulting album, Tengo que marchar, was released in 1986.

=== Second lineup (1994–2002) ===
In 1994, Tele announced his reformation of Triana without Rodway. The new line-up featured vocalist and guitarist Juan Reina, guitarists Andrés Herrera (better known as Pájaro) and Raúl Fernández, keyboardist Emilio Grueso, and bassist Santi Camps. The decision to name this band Triana proved controversial among fans, as it included only one of the original members. Triana released their eighth album, Un jardín eléctrico in 1997, followed the next year by En libertad. Both of these albums received poor reviews. In 2002, Tele died of a heart attack and the band subsequently disbanded again.

=== Third lineup (2007–present) ===
In 2007, the other five members of the 1994–2002 lineup of Triana announced they were reforming the band with drummer Marcos Gamero taking Tele's place. This move proved extremely controversial among fans as only one of the original trio was alive and he did not take part in the reunion. Rodway released a statement disowning the new Triana, claiming they were merely trying to profit from the band's legacy. Triana released their tenth album, Un camino por andar, in 2008.

Former guitarist Eduardo Rodríguez Rodway died on 26 September 2026, at the age of 81.

== Members ==
=== Current members ===
- Juan Reina (vocals, guitar) (1994–present)
- Andrés "Pájaro" Herrera (guitar) (1994–present)
- Raúl Fernández (guitar) (1994–present)
- Emilio Grueso (keyboard) (1994–present)
- Santi Camps (bass guitar) (1994–present)
- Marcos Gamero (drums) (2007–present)

=== Original members ===
- Juan José "Tele" Palacios (drums) (1974–2002; his death)
- Jesús de la Rosa Luque (vocals, keyboards) (1974–1983; his death)
- Eduardo Rodríguez Rodway (guitar, vocals) (1974–1985; died 2026)

== Discography ==
=== Studio albums ===
- El Patio (1975)
- Hijos del agobio (1977)
- Sombra y luz (1979)
- Un encuentro (1980)
- Un mal sueño (1981)
- Llegó el día (1983)
- Tengo que marchar (1986)
- Un jardín eléctrico (1997)
- En libertad (1998)
- Un camino por andar (2008)

=== Live albums ===
- En directo (1989)
