= Kiko Veneno =

Spanish musician

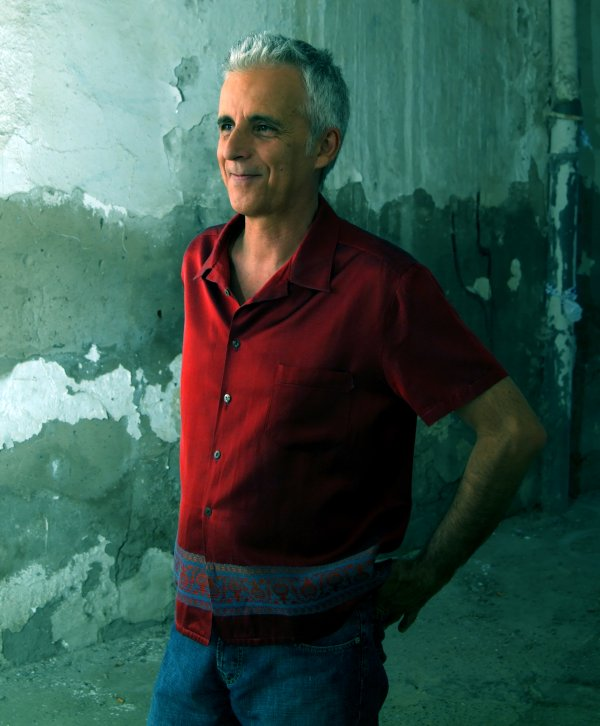
Kiko Veneno in 2005

José María López Sanfeliu (born April 3, 1952), better known by his stage name Kiko Veneno, is a Spanish musician.

== Biography ==
He was born in Figueres, where he was brought up in a military home, and later grew up in Cádiz finally settling down in Seville. He got the nickname Kiko while studying at university. He studied History and philosophy and after graduating travelled through Europe and the US. During his travels he attended concerts of artists like Frank Zappa and Bob Dylan, which influenced his style. Still, also during these years he rediscovered flamenco. In 1975 he formed the group Veneno with brothers Rafael and Raimundo Amador. In 1977 they released the eponymous album Veneno produced by Ricardo Pachón. Although not a great hit at the time it is now considered a classic Spanish album.

In 1979 he collaborated with Camarón de la Isla, the famous gypsy flamenco singer, on the classic album La leyenda del tiempo. In 1982 he published his first solo album Seré Mecánico por Ti, produced by José Luis de Carlos, which sold poorly. During the 1980s he continued to publish songs but due to lack of commercial success he had to supplement his music working for the council of Seville.

The most successful part of his career started in 1992 when he signed with BMG-Ariola and released the albums Échate un cantecito (1992) and Está muy bien eso del cariño (1995), both produced by Joe Dworniak. The first album included several hits like "En Un Mercedes Blanco" and "Joselito". The success of these albums allowed him to devote himself full-time to music.

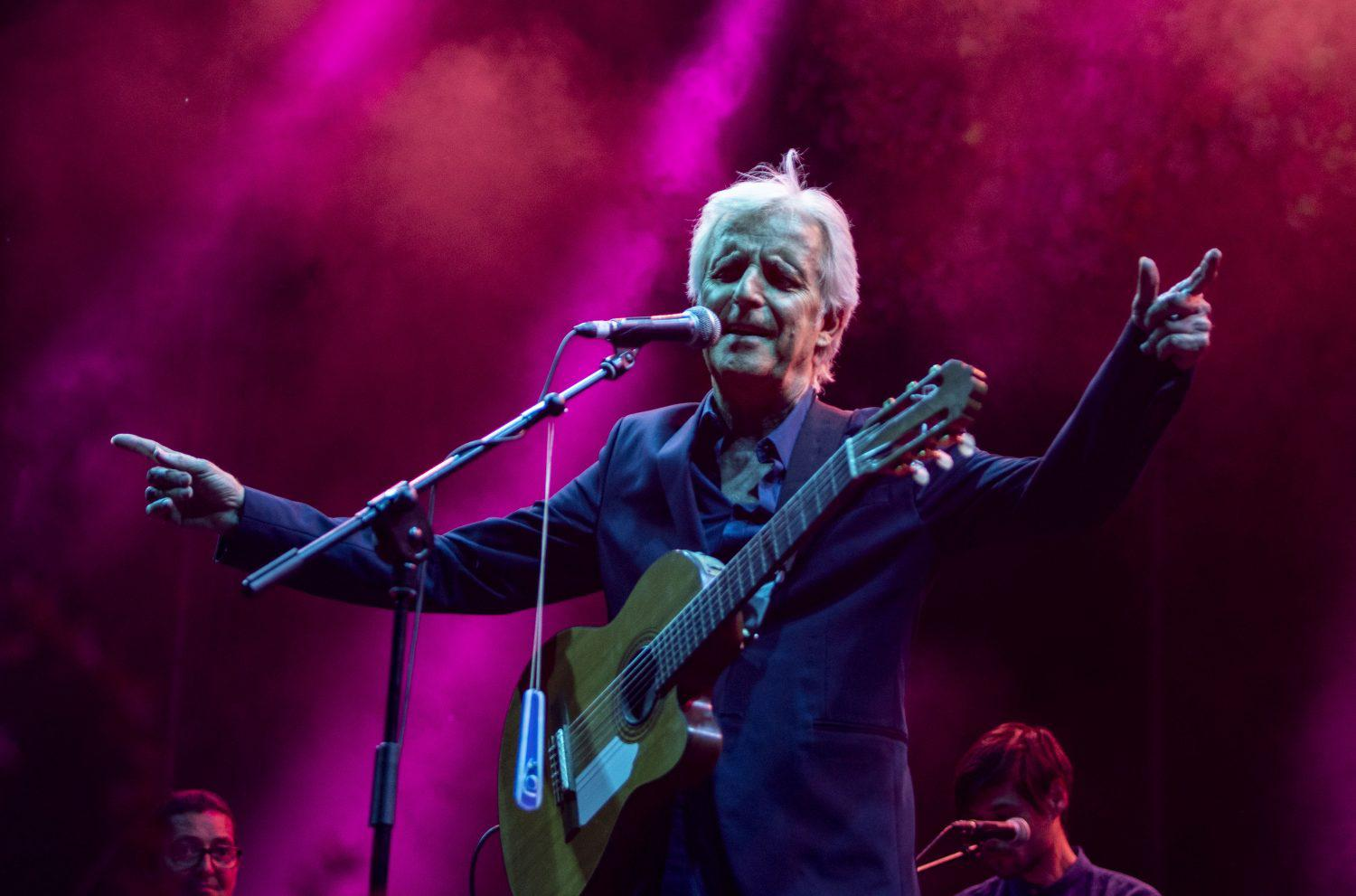
Kiko Veneno in 2019.

In 1992, Kiko sponsored the creation of a band that would be called Mártires del Compás, formed by Chico Ocaña, Raúl Rodríguez and José Caraoscura. Disagreements between Ocaña and Kiko meant that the band split in two: Ocaña took the name of the group and went solo, and Raúl Rodríguez and José Caraoscura (Kiko in the background) formed Caraoscura. They released an album in 1995 entitled ¿Qué es lo que quieres de mí?

In 1999 he toured Argentina to give a series of concerts which were a critical success. After three more records Kiko ended his contract with Ariola and decided to produce his future music himself.

In September 2005 he released El Hombre Invisible. Ever since, he has mostly collaborated with other musicians, while releasing his own new songs only via digital download.

In 2006 he formed the band G5 along Los Delinqüentes, Tomasito and Muchachito Bombo Infierno.

His album Sombrero Roto was nominated for IMPALA's European Independent Album of the Year Award (2019).

== Selected discography ==
=== Veneno ===
- Veneno (CBS, 1977).
- El pueblo guapeao (Twins, 1989).

=== Kiko Veneno ===
- Seré mecánico por ti (Epic, 1981).
- "Si tú, si yo" (Epic, 1984) - maxisingle.
- Pequeño salvaje (Nuevos Medios, 1987).
- Échate un cantecito (BMG Ariola, 1992).
- Está muy bien eso del cariño (BMG, 1995).
- Punta Paloma (BMG, 1997).
- Puro veneno (BMG, 1998)
- La familia pollo (BMG, 2000).
- El hombre invisible (Nuevos Medios, 2005).
- Dice la Gente (Warner, 2010).
- Sensación Térmica (2013)

=== Kiko Veneno and Pepe Begines ===
- Gira mundial (Elemúsica, 2002).

=== Compilation albums ===
- Un ratito de gloria (BMG, 2001)

=== G5 ===
- Tucaratupapi (2007), with Los Delinqüentes, Muchachito Bombo Infierno and Tomasito
