= Lole y Manuel =

Gitano musical duo

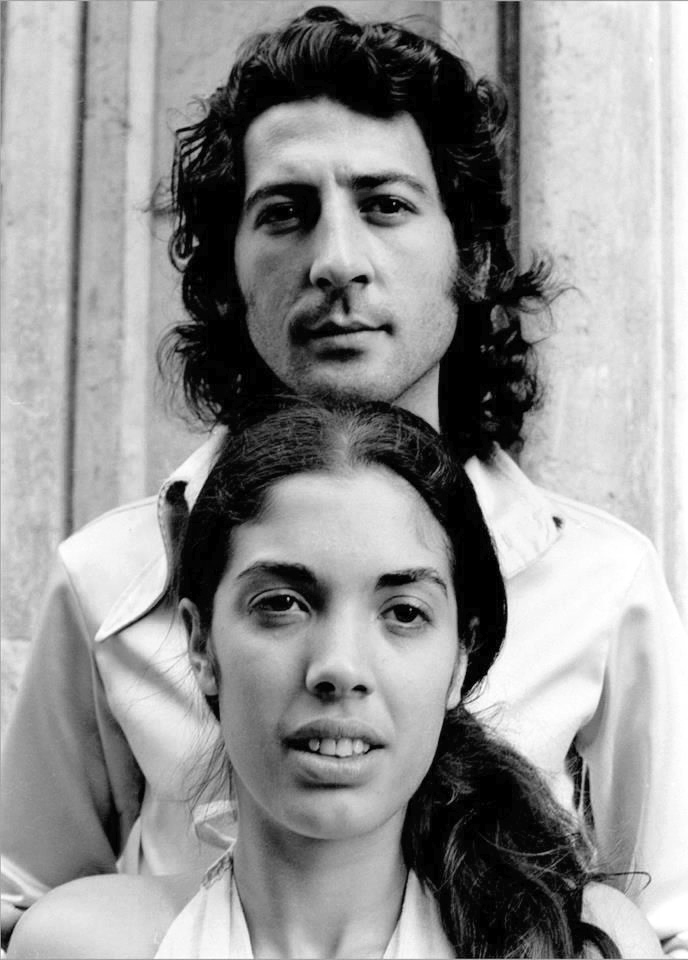

Lole y Manuel was a gitano (Spanish Romani) musical duo formed by singer Dolores Montoya Rodríguez (b. 1954) and guitarist Manuel Molina Jiménez (1948–2015). They composed and performed innovative flamenco music between 1972 and 1993. The music is recognized for the emotive, yet sweet voice of Lole Montoya and the operatic, flashy guitar of Manuel.

This couple was the first exponent of flamenco music aimed at a non-exclusively flamenco audience. They were one of the precursors to the musical stream called "New flamenco".

Lole and Manuel were married a professional couple. Both are members of Romani families of artistic descent. Manuel was the son of Manuel Molina Acosta, better known as "El Encajero", who was a professional guitar player. Lole is the daughter of flamenco singer and dancer Antonia Rodríguez Moreno, better known as "La Negra", and her father was the dancer Juan Montoya. Their daughter is the singer Alba Molina.

Their groundbreaking first album Nuevo Día, decisively produced by flamenco producer Ricardo Pachón, fused traditional Spanish flamenco with Molina's poetic lyrics by Juan Manuel Flores and foreign styles and influences. Nuevo Día (1975), was released without promotion and ultimately became a critical and commercial success. The LP introduced instruments that had never before been used in the genre, such as the mellotron. This work influenced subsequent nuevo flamenco releases, including Veneno (1977) by Kiko Veneno and La leyenda del tiempo (1978) by Camarón de la Isla, both of which were also produced by Pachón.

Over the next few years, they released Pasaje del Agua (1976) and Lole y Manuel (1977), both of which continued their experimental style and incorporated Arabic influences. After a break, they returned with Al Alba Con Alegría (1980), a tribute to their daughter Alba Molina, produced by Imán and Califato Independiente instead of Pachón. In 1984, they released Casta, which featured orchestral arrangements and production by Gualberto García. Following their artistic and personal separation, they reunited in 1992 with an album of symphonic versions of Manuel de Falla's works, followed by Alba Molina in 1994 and a final live album the following year. Subsequently, both pursued solo careers.

Lole and Manuel's music is present in films as significant as Manuela by Gonzalo García Pelayo, Flamenco by Carlos Saura and Siesta by Mary Lambert, and in the 2018 documentary film Camarón: Flamenco y Revolución, from the Spanish director Alexis Morante, released through Netflix. Their 1975 track, Tu Mirá, features one of Montoya's most emotive vocal performances, accompanied by a large choir and an epic organ (in addition to Manuel's guitar), and is included on the soundtrack for Quentin Tarantino's Kill Bill: Volume 2.

Now, Lole has completed the details of her new album with the guitarist from Jerez de la Frontera, Diego Del Morao.

On May 19, 2015, Manuel Molina died at the age of 67 at his home in San Juan de Aznalfarache, Spain.

== Discography ==
- Nuevo Día/El Origen De Una Leyenda (1975)
- Pasaje del Agua (1976)
- Lole y Manuel (1977)
- Al Alba Con Alegría (1980). Acompañados por Imán, Califato Independiente.
- Casta (1984)
- Lole y Manuel Cantan a Manuel de Falla (1992)
- Alba Molina (1994)
- Una Voz y Una Guitarra. Grabado en directo desde el Teatro Monumental de Madrid (1995).
