= Flamenco rock =

Spanish cultural movement and music genre

- Stylistic origins: Rock; flamenco; progressive rock
- Cultural origins: Late 1960s – early 1970s, Andalusia, Spain
- Typical instruments: Flamenco guitar; classical guitar; electric guitar; bass guitar; keyboard; drums; castanets; palmas; cajón

Flamenco rock or Andalusian rock is a rock music fusion genre that emerged from (but is not limited to) the Spanish region of Andalusia throughout the late 1960s and early 1970s. There were some precedents like a couple of albums (Rock Encounter and The Soul of Flamenco and the Essence of Rock) by Sabicas, a handful of singles by Smash, Gong, Galaxia, Flamenco or even the American-British band Carmen. However, Triana was recognized as a pioneer of the genre since their music focuses on a homogeneous fusion of the progressive rock and flamenco. Many bands that mixed progressive and symphonic rock with flamenco followed them, such as Imán Califato Independiente, Cai, Guadalquivir, Alameda or Mezquita; that is why the term Andalusian rock may be understood simply as flamenco prog.

Medina Azahara turned from progressive to a hard rock outfit in the 1980s and they remain as one of the most popular flamenco rock bands in their home nation. Other flamenco-influenced styles of rock emerged like the flamenco-folk-rock band Veneno, flamenco-blues-rock band Pata Negra, and other bands that melted flamenco with African, reggae or Latin rhythms.
