= Raimundo Amador =

Spanish gypsy guitar player

Raimundo Amador Fernández (born May 26, 1959) is a Spanish gypsy guitar player.

== Biography ==
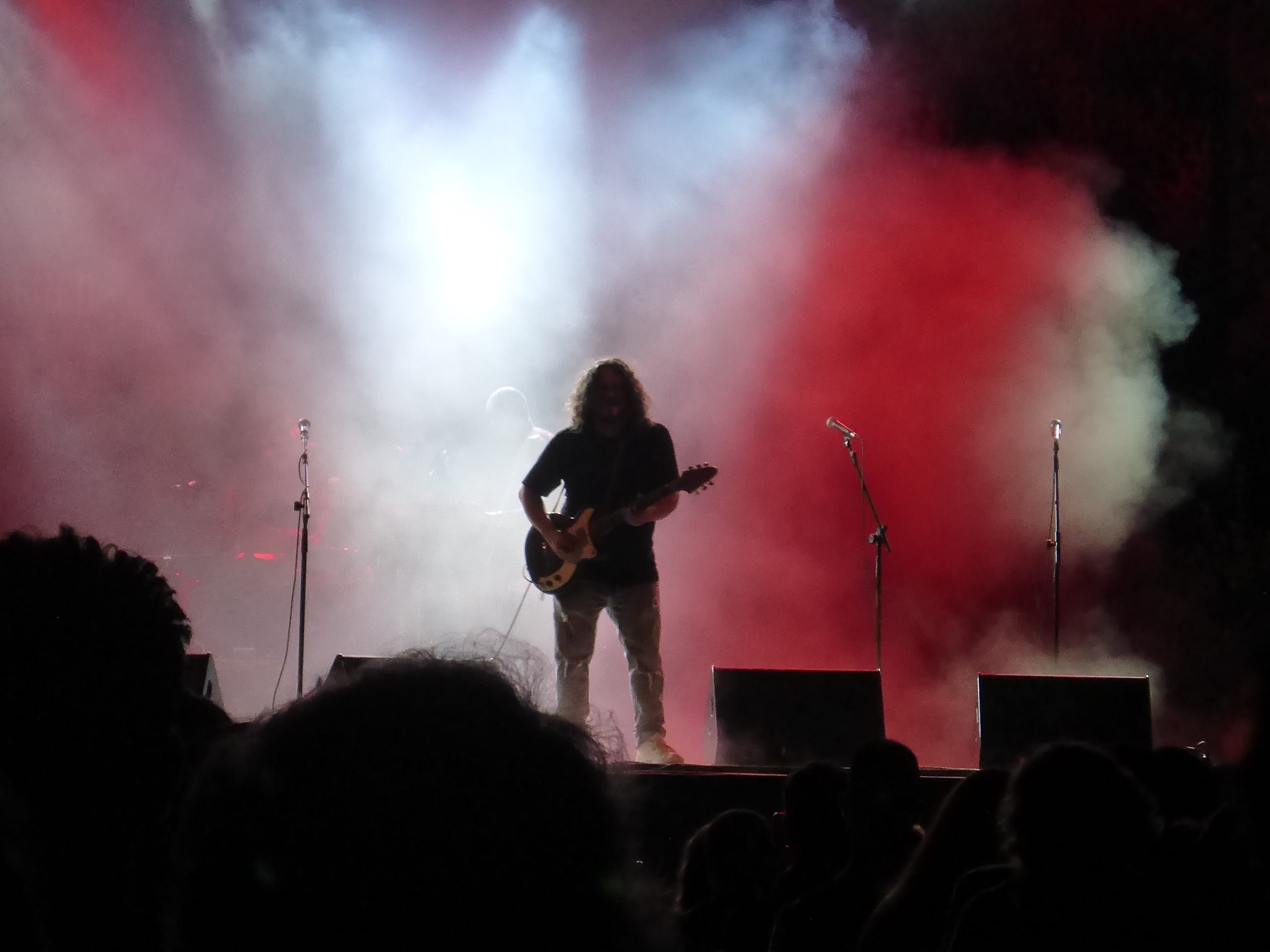
Performing in 2019

He was born in Sevilla and started playing the guitar for well-known flamenco artists like Fernanda de Utrera, Camarón de la Isla and Paco de Lucía.

Later he followed his own way, mixing flamenco and blues (he performed with B. B. King), founding the group Pata Negra and collaborating with Kiko Veneno in the 1980s.
