= Latin Grammy Award for Best Flamenco Album =

- Awarded for: Flamenco albums containing at least 51% playing time of newly recorded material. For Solo artists, duos or groups.
- Country: United States
- Presented by: The Latin Recording Academy
- First award: 2000
- Currently held by: Las Migas for Flamencas (2025)
- Website: latingrammy.com

The Latin Grammy Award for Best Flamenco Album is an honor presented annually at the Latin Grammy Awards, a ceremony that recognizes excellence and creates a wider awareness of cultural diversity and contributions of Latin recording artists in the United States and internationally.

According to the Latin Grammy Awards category description guide, the award was given, "For vocal or instrumental Flamenco albums containing at least 51% playing time of newly recorded material. For Solo artists, duos or groups." Since the inception of the category, only Spanish performing artists have received the award.

Spanish musician Tomatito and Spanish singer Niña Pastori hold the record of most wins in the category with four wins each, followed by Paco de Lucía with three wins. In 2014, Paco de Lucía won posthumously both this award and Album of the Year with his last album Canción Andaluza, becoming the first flamenco artist and album to do so.

== Recipients ==
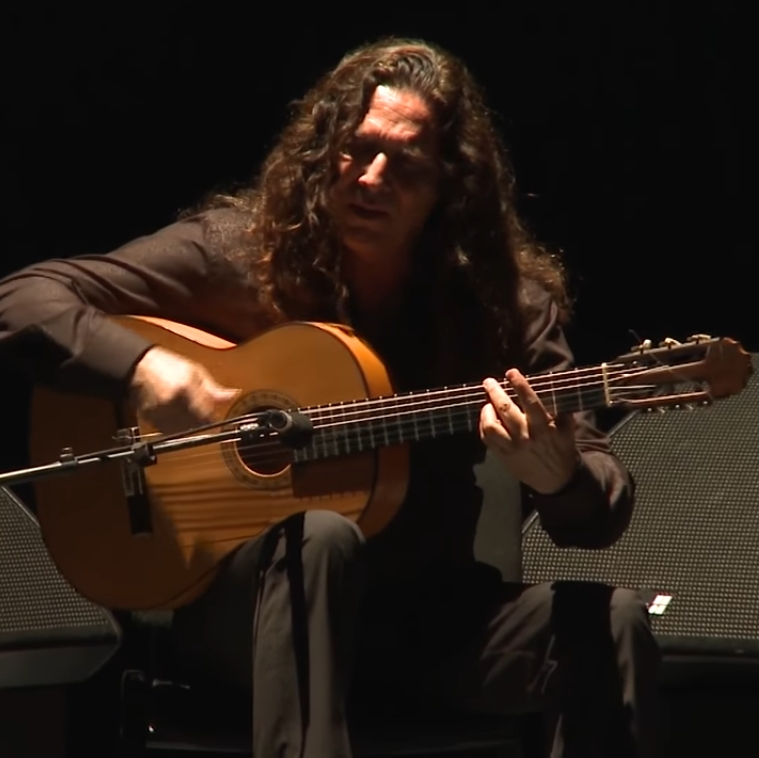
Tomatito was one of the first winners of this award in 2000 for Paris 87. Additionally, he has won three more times, in 2005, 2010 and 2013.

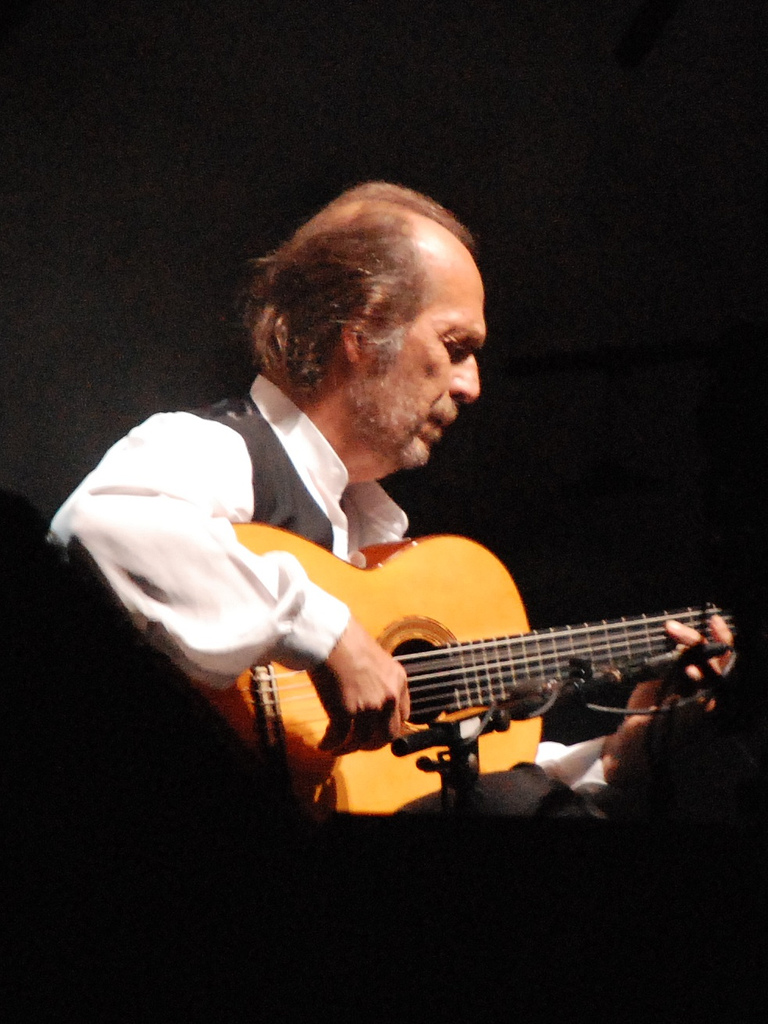
Paco de Lucía has won this award three times, in 2004 for Cositas Buenas, in 2012 for En Vivo Conciertos España 2010 and in 2014 for Canción Andaluza, also winning Album of the Year for the latter.

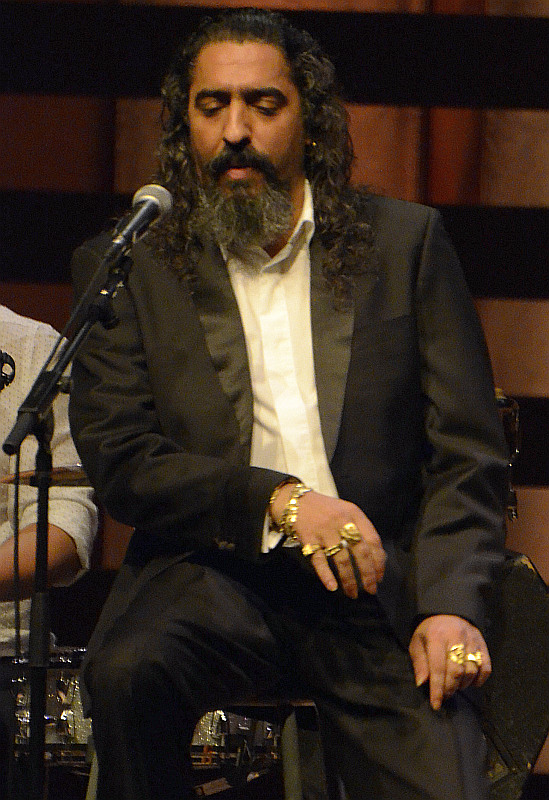
2006 winner Diego El Cigala.

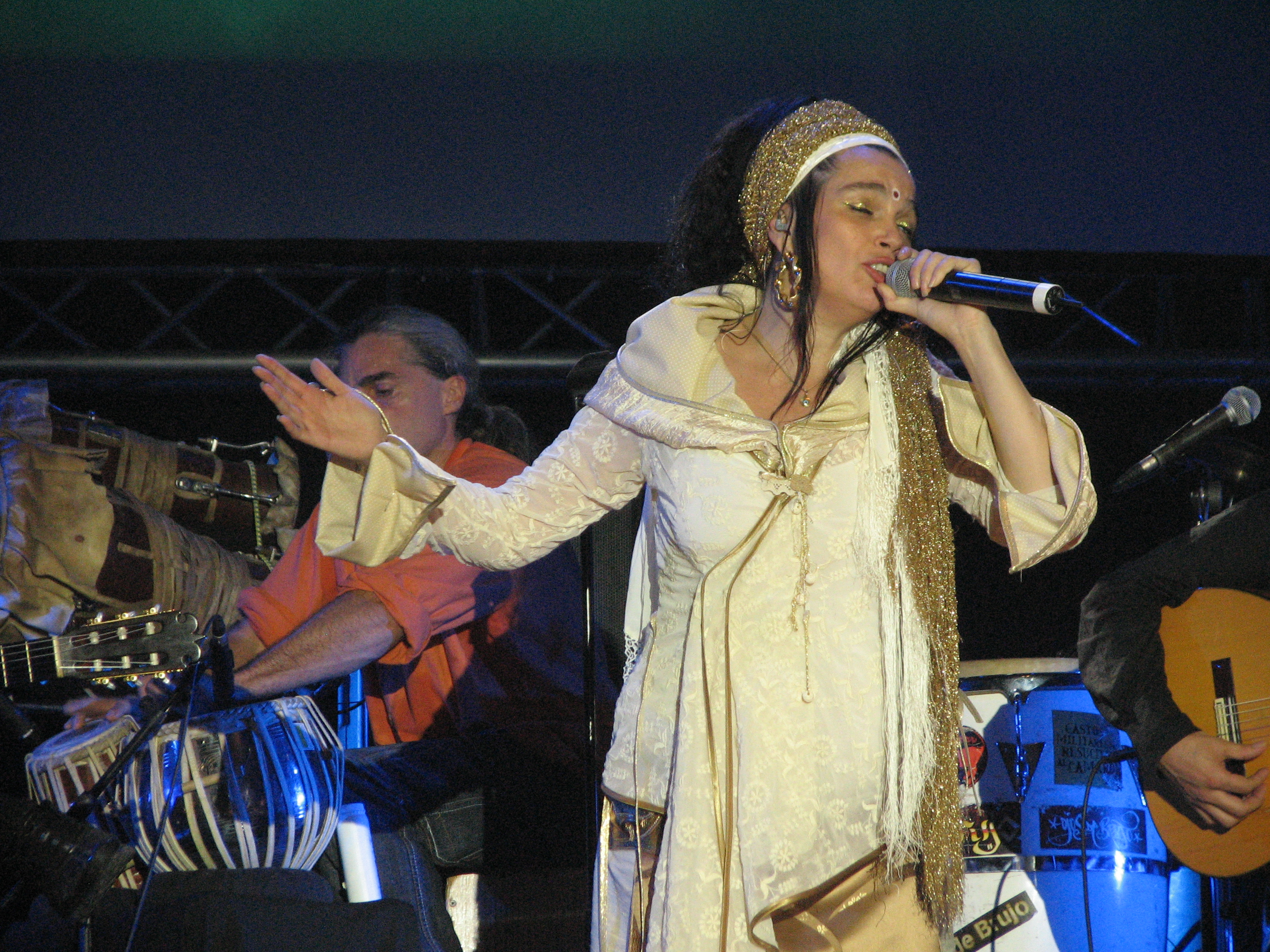
2007 winners Ojos de Brujo, the first group to win the award.

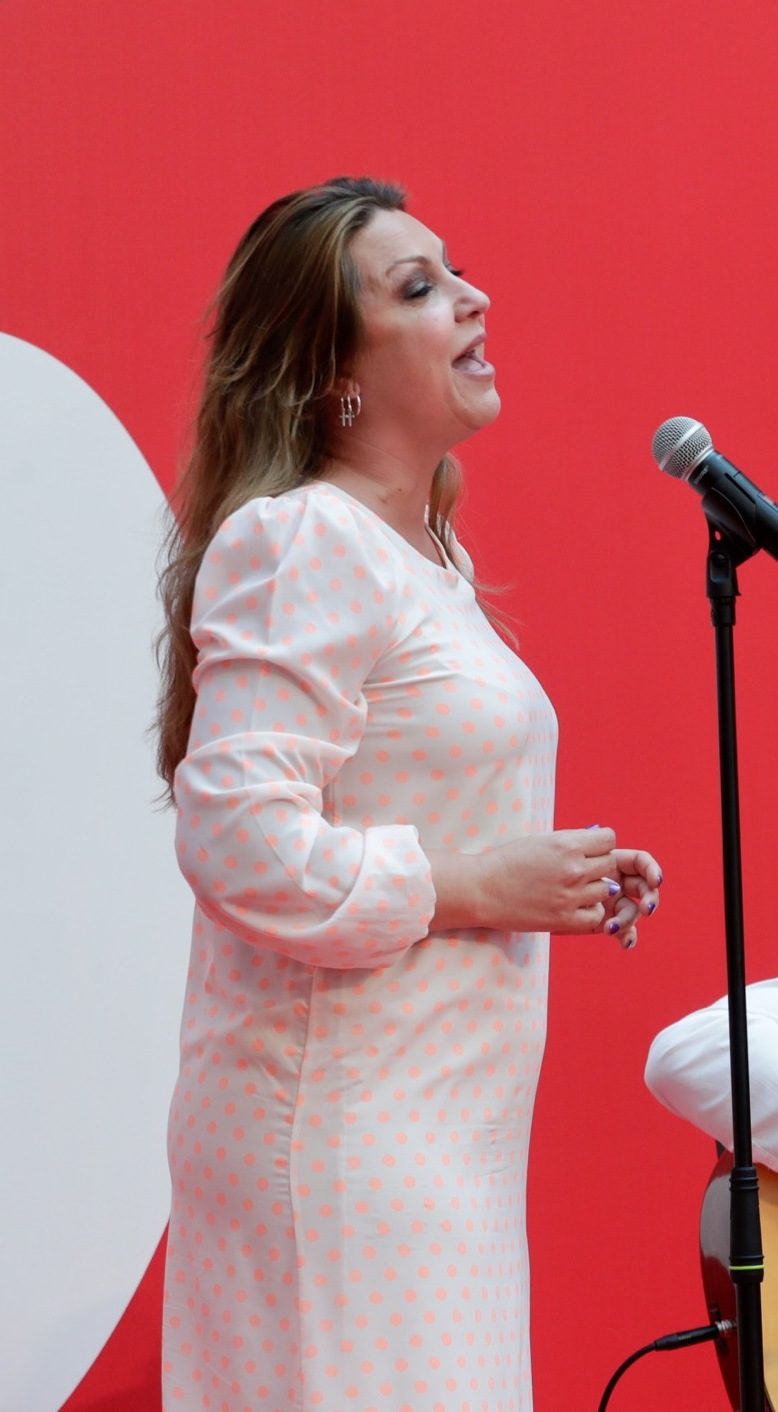
Four-time winner Niña Pastori, the first solo female artist to win the award.

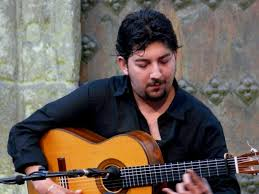
2020 and 2024 winner Antonio Rey.

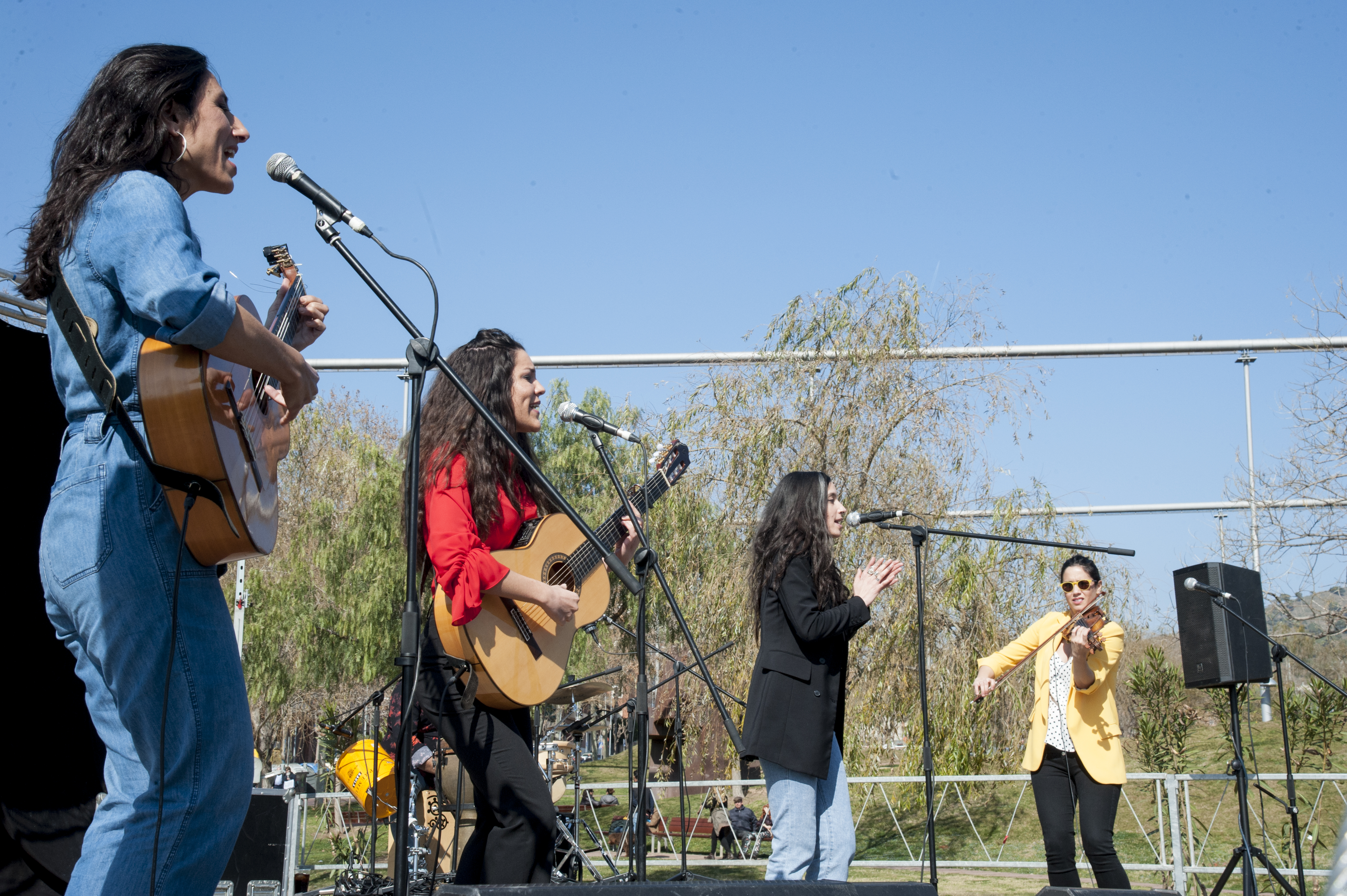
Two-time winners Las Migas were the first all-female group to win the award in 2022.

Year^{[I]}	Performing artist(s)	Work	Nominees^{[II]}	Ref.
2000	Camarón & Tomatito	Paris 87	Remedios Amaya – Gitana Soy; Juan Habichuela – De la zambra al duende... un homenaje; El Lebrijano – Lágrimas de cera; Miguel Poveda – Suena Flamenco	
2001	Vicente Amigo	Ciudad de las Ideas	Montse Cortés – Alabanza; Mayte Martín – Querencia; José Mercé – Aire; Estrella Morente – Mi Cante y un Poema; Navajita Plateá – Hablando en Plata	
2002	Antonio Núñez	Mis 70 Años Con El Cante	Remedios Amaya – Sonsonete; Arcángel – Arcángel; Diego El Cigala – Corren Tiempos De Alegría; Martirio – Mucho Corazón	
2003	Pepe de Lucía	El Corazón De Mi Gente	Juan Carmona – Orillas; Diego El Cigala with Niño Josele – Teatro Real de Madrid; Carmen Linares with Gerardo Núñez Trio – Un Ramito de Locura; José Mercé – Lío; Victor Monge Serranito with Camerata Romeu – Sueños de Ida y Vuelta; Various Artists; Gerardo Núñez & Angel "Cepillo" Sánchez (producers) – Gerardo Núñez Presenta La Nueva Escuela de Guitarra Flamenca	
2004	Paco de Lucía	Cositas Buenas	Raimundo Amador – Isla Menor; El Pele & Vicente Amigo – Canto; Lebrijano – Yo Me Llamo Juan; Enrique Morente – El Pequeño Reloj	
2005	Tomatito	Aguadulce	Diego Carrasco – Mi Adn Flamenco; José Mercé – Confí De Fuá; Gerardo Núñez with Paolo Fresu, Perico Sambeat & Mariano Díaz – Andando El Tiempo; Niña Pastori – No Hay Quinto Malo	
2006	Diego El Cigala	Picasso En Mis Ojos	Vicente Amigo – Un Momento En El Sonido; Javier Limón – Limón; Enrique Morente – Sueña La Alhambra; Estrella Morente – Mujeres	
2007	Ojos de Brujo	Techarí	Calima – Azul; Juan Carmona – Sinfonia Flamenca; Miguel Poveda – Tierra De Calma; Son De La Frontera – Cal	
2008	Juan Habichuela	Una Guitarra En Granada	Diego Amador – Río de los Canasteros; Camarón de la Isla – Reencuentro; Esperanza Fernández – Recuerdos; Lole – Metáfora	
2009	Niña Pastori	Esperando Verte	Vicente Amigo – Paseo de Gracia; Carmen Linares – Raíces y Alas; Enrique Morente – Flamenco; Miguel Poveda – Coplas del Querer	
2010	Tomatito	Sonata Suite	Juan Carmona – El Sentido del Aire; José Mercé – Ruido; Enrique Morente – Morente Flamenco en Directo; Niño Josele – Española	
2011	Niña Pastori	La Orilla de mi Pelo	Josemi Carmona – Las Pequeñas Cosas; Chano Domínguez – Piano Ibérico; Ojos de Brujo – 10 Años – Corriente Vital; Pastora Soler – 15 Años	
2012	Paco de Lucía	En Vivo Conciertos España 2010	Antonio Cortés – Cuando Quieras; Niño Josele – El Mar de Mi Ventana; Diana Navarro – Flamenco; Various Artists; Antonio Cortés Moreno "Barullo" (producer) – México Flamenco	
2013	Tomatito	Soy Flamenco	Vicente Amigo – Tierra; Argentina – Un Viaje Por El Cante; José Mercé – Mi Única Llave; Estrella Morente – Autorretrato; Miguel Poveda – Real	
2014	Paco de Lucía	Canción Andaluza	Juan Carmona – Alchemya; Enrique Morente – Morente; Juan Pinilla & Fernando Valverde – Jugar Con Fuego; Rosario La Tremendita – Fatum	
2015	Various Artists: Javier Limón, producer	Entre 20 Aguas: A La Música de Paco De Lucía	Joselito Acedo – Andando; Argentina – Sinergia; Blas Córdoba "El Kejío" and Chano Domínguez – Bendito; Estrella Morente & Niño Josele – Amar En Paz; Miguel Poveda – Sonetos Y Poemas Para La Libertad; María Toledo – conSentido	
2016	Niña Pastori	Ámame Como Soy	Remedios Amaya – Rompiendo El Silencio; José Mercé – Doy La Cara; Antonio Reyes & Diego Del Morao – Directo En El Círculo Flamenco de Madrid; María Toledo – Magnética	
2017	Vicente Amigo	Memoria de Los Sentidos	Diego Guerrero – Vengo Caminando; Las Migas – Vente Conmigo; José Mijita – Se Llama Flamenco; Tomasa La Macanita & Manuel Valencia – Directo En El Círculo Flamenco De Madrid	
2018	Arcángel	Al Este Del Cante	Dani de Morón – 21; Alba Molina – Caminando con Manuel; Rosario La Tremendita – Delirium Tremens; Samuel Serrano – Dos Caminos	
2019	Not awarded			
2020	Antonio Rey	Flamenco sin Fronteras	Ezequiel Benitez – Quimeras del Tiempo "Ilus3"; Antonio Campos – Tardo Antiguo; Naike Ponce – Vivir; Antonio Reyes – Que Suene el Cante	
2021	Pepe de Lucía	Un Nuevo Universo	Paco Candela – Alma de Pura Raza; Israel Fernández & Diego Del Morao – Amor; Rafael Riqueni – Herencia; María Toledo – El Rey	
2022	Las Migas	Libres	Carmen Doorá – Orgánica; Estrella Morente – Leo; Kiki Morente – El Cante; María Toledo – Ranchera Flamenca	
2023	Niña Pastori	Camino	Israel Fernández – Pura Sangre; Diego Guerrero – Por la Tangente; Omar Montes – Quejíos de un Maleante; Juanfe Pérez – Prohibido el Toque	
2024	Antonio Rey	Historias de un Flamenco	Vicente Amigo – Andenes del Tiempo; Las Migas – Rumberas	
2025	Las Migas	Flamencas	Andrés Barrios – KM.0; Kiki Morente – Azabache; Ángeles Toledano – Sangre Sucia	

== See also ==
- Cante flamenco
- Flamenco guitar
- Palo (flamenco)
