= Javier Limón =

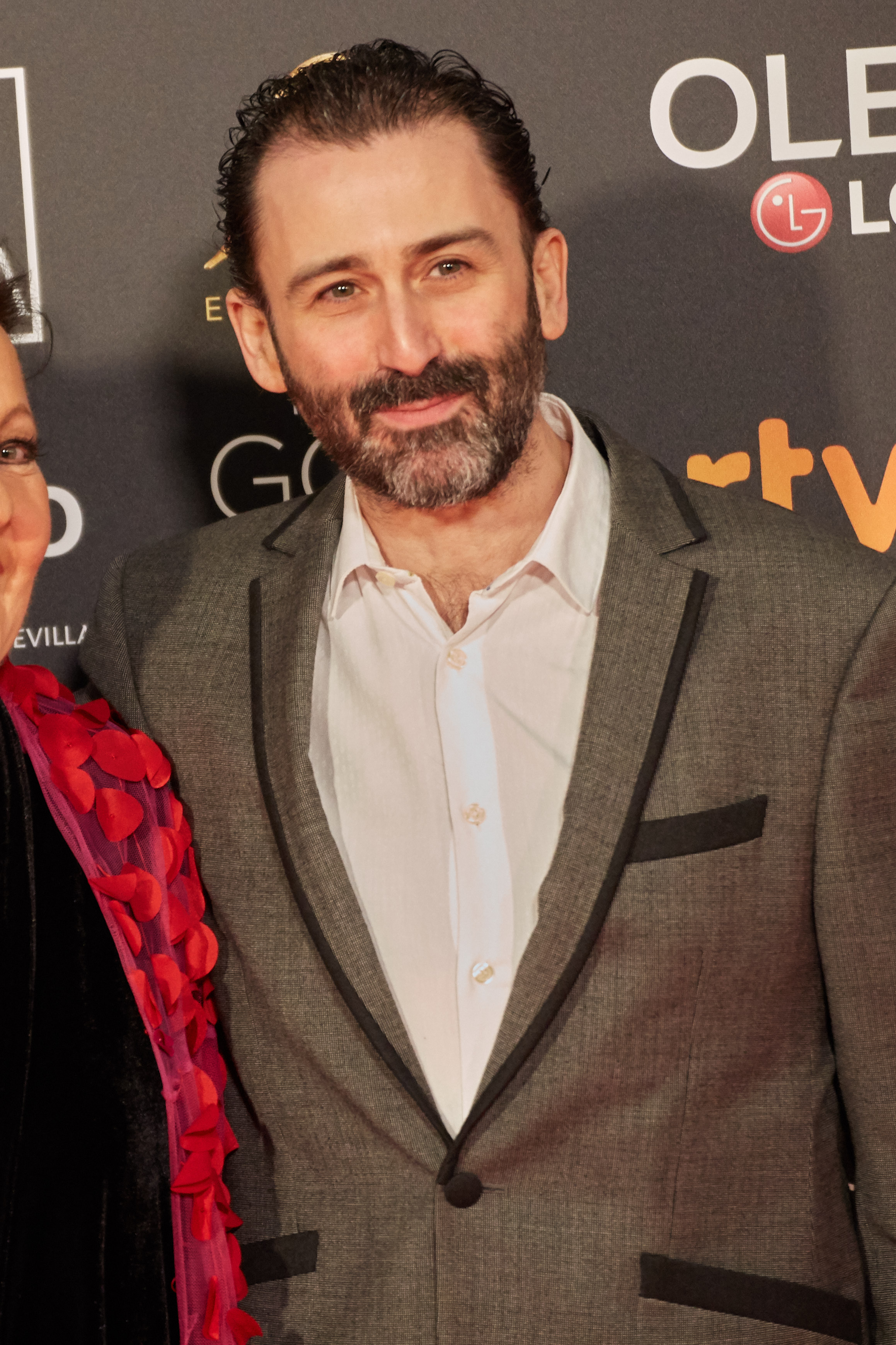
- A record producer, singer and songwriter

Background information
- Born: 1973 (age 51–52); Madrid, Spain
- Genres: Rock, pop, flamenco
- Occupation(s): Record producer, singer-songwriter
- Labels: Casa Limón
- Website: javierlimon.net

Javier Limón (born 1973) is a record producer, singer and songwriter born and raised in Madrid, Spain. Limón has worked with several artists, mainly from Spain, since he incorporates elements of flamenco rhythm to his work. Besides his work as producer has also dabbled as an interpreter and has released three studio albums, Limón, Son de Limón and Mujeres de Agua. Since 2003, Limón has done recordings in Israel, Bogotá, Bristol, Paris, Bahía Blanca, Buenos Aires, New York City and Morocco. In 2004, Limón was awarded the Latin Grammy Award for Producer of the Year for his work on Lágrimas Negras by Diego El Cigala and Bebo Valdés, Cositas Buenas by Paco de Lucía, El Cantante by Andrés Calamaro, El Pequeño Reloj by Enrique Morente, Niño Josele by Niño Josele and Tributo Flamenco A Don Juan Valderrama by Various Artists. Javier Limón serves as the Artistic Director of the Berklee College of Music's Mediterranean Music Institute, which operates in Valencia, Spain as well as Boston, Massachusetts.

== Background ==
After completing his musical studies in piano and guitar at the Conservatory of Madrid and at New York's Saint Francis Prep., Limón began his professional career composing flamenco songs for artists such as Enrique Morente, Estrella Morente, Remedios Amaya, Potito and Montse Cortés. Following this first stage, he started his career as a record producer with Cositas Buenas by Paco de Lucía, Lágrimas Negras by Bebo Valdés and Diego El Cigala and El Pequeño Reloj by Enrique Morente. The recording process of Lágrimas Negras, which took three days to record, was filmed by Spanish filmmaker Fernando Trueba. The album earned the Latin Grammy Award for Best Traditional Tropical Album and received a nomination for Album of the Year. Lágrimas Negras stayed in the Spanish Album Charts for over 100 weeks. In 2009, Limón was awarded a Grammy Award for Best Latin Jazz Album for the album Juntos Para Siempre, another collaboration with Bebo Valdés.

== Musical style and production ==
Talent is the most important thing in order to make music. It only took a microphone and an orchestra to record the jewels that Gardel and the Sinatra did. The technological variety that exists now will produce a variety of art, and come when every kind of music that will suit the customer. I want my music to be linked to an object. Maybe because I come from a culture that valued the object: to touch it, look it and have it.

— Javier Limón, El País

To produce, Limón uses editing software such as Pro Tools, Cubase, Logic, mixing material in an analog way, not digital, and then "edit[ing] the album in the appropriate format." Limón acknowledges that to make music in modern times, artists can "skip all the costs of intermediaries, but there's nothing like a studio where everyone can play at once, but that costs money to keep." The main idea for Limón's production style is not to rely too heavily on the recording technology, so the final result documents the actual performance in the studio as closely as possible. Besides flamenco, Limón works in other musical genres. "There's electronic stuff [that] will be interesting to tackle. Now I'm doing some hip-hop, which also interests me."

About his lyrical style, Limón prefers free metric while writing traditional flamenco music, which is written in tercets, quatrains and cinquains with classic rhymes. "I consider that my lyrics have content. I sometimes write the lyrics before the music. And I've noticed that one of the interesting ways to enrich the flamenco composition is to write poetry that is not in octosyllabic or heroic verse," said Limón to Flamenco World. Limón is a fan of Japanese haiku, since he admitted that "the most beautiful flamenco poetry has been written in haikus."

== Casa Limón ==
Limón started his own record label, Casa Limón, with the help of a sponsor (a brand of beer named 1906). Limón wanted total creative independence, without pursuing record sales, but to become a well-made product reference. The first album released by the label, Limón (2003), was based on multiculturality and setting down roots. The album includes special appearances by Paco de Lucía, Niño Josele, La Tana and Potito, among others, performing original scores by Limón. Limón asked all the musicians involved on albums by Enrique Morente, Luz Casal, Andrés Calamaro and Paco de Lucía, among others, to join the label because they were always the same. Piranha, Alain Pérez and Niño Josele were the first musicians joining the project. "It's like a team that has been widening with other artists such as Eliane Elias, Marc Johnson, the jazz people, Carlinhos Brown... I am putting a name on something that already exists." The album received a Latin Grammy Award nomination for Best Flamenco Album. Concha Buika recorded her first album with Casa Limón and sold 150,000 units in Spain.

In 2010, Limón produced and composed Mujeres de Agua, a collaboration album with performances by Mariza, Buika, La Shica, Montse, Genara, Aynur, Eleftheria, Estrella, Yasmin Levy, Susi, Sandra and Carmen Linares. Limón described the album as a "search for songs from the Mediterranean that were undiscovered jewels." Mujeres de Agua peaked at number 14 in the Spanish album charts.

== Discography ==
- Limón (2005)
- Son de Limón (2008)
- Mujeres de Agua (2010)
- Promesas de Tierra (2013)
- Oro (Original SoundTrack) (2017)
- Refugio del Sonido (2018)
- Todos Lo Saben (Original Motion Picture Soundtrack) (2018)
- OQ (album) (2018)
