= Canción Andaluza =

Studio album by Paco de Lucía
- Released: April 29, 2014
- Recorded: 2012–2013
- Studio: Casa Paco, Palma de Mallorca
- Genre: Flamenco
- Length: 35:50
- Label: Universal Music Spain
- Producer: Paco de Lucía

Paco de Lucía chronology
Cositas Buenas (2004)	Canción Andaluza (2014)

Canción Andaluza (English: Andalusian Song) is the final studio album by Spanish musician Paco de Lucía, released on April 29, 2014 through Universal Music Spain. It was released posthumously after his death on February 25, 2014. Produced by de Lucía himself, it features collaborations with fellow Flamenco singers Estrella Morente and Vicente Castro "Parrita", and Venezuelan salsa musician Oscar D'León.

At the 15th Annual Latin Grammy Awards, the album won Album of the Year, becoming the first flamenco music album to win the award, also the album won Best Flamenco Album, being the third time he wins that category after receiving the award for Cositas Buenas in 2004 and En Vivo Conciertos España 2010 in 2012.

== Background ==
Canción Andaluza marked the first studio album by de Lucía in ten years since Cositas Buenas, released in 2014. The album was recorded at Casa Paco, his residency in Palma de Mallorca, Spain between late 2012 and early 2013, with the post-production of the album being marked by the death of de Lucía, who died on February 25, 2014, in Playa del Carmen, Mexico. The production of the album appeared in the 2014 documentary film Paco de Lucía: La Búsqueda, directed by Francisco Sánchez Varela. The cover for the album is a portrait of de Lucía, taken by his wife Gabriela Canseco.

The album consists of eight coplas, a form of Spanish popular song also called "canción andaluza". It opens with "María de la O", a song written by composers Manuel López-Quiroga, Rafael de León and Salvador Valverde, and popularized by Marifé de Triana. The second track is "Ojos Verdes", also written by Quiroga, León and Valverde. Both songs had previously appeared in 12 Éxitos Para Dos Guitarras Flmencas (1965), the third collaborative album of de Lucía with Spanish guitarist Ricardo Modrego. The third track is "Romance de Valentía", followed by "Te He de Querer Mientras Viva", a song dedicated to Gabriela Canseco. The latter song features singer Estrella Morente, de Lucía had previously appeared in Morente's 2012 album Autorretrato, in the track "Seguirillas de la Verdad".

The fifth track is "La Chiquita Piconera", a song popularized by singer Pepe Pinto, among others. The next track "Zambra Gitana" is the second collaboration in the album, featuring vocals from singer Vicente Castro "Parrita". The seventh track is "Quiroga por Bulerías", a compendium of the melodies of "La Ruiseñora", "Lola la Piconera", "Señor Sargento Ramírez" and "Candelaria la del Puerto", all written by Antonio Quintero alongside Manuel Quiroga and Rafael de León. The final track is the Caribbean-infused "Señorita", written by de León and Juan Solano Pedrero. The song features the third collaborator of the album, Venezuelan salsa musician and bassist Oscar D'León.

== Commercial performance ==
In Spain, Canción Andaluza debuted at the top of the Spanish Albums chart, staying in the chart for 35 weeks. It is the first and only number-one album in the chart to date as well as his highest appearance in the chart since Cositas Buenas (2005), which peaked at number 37. The album also appeared at the Spanish Albums year-end chart, peaking at number 41. Canción Andaluza was algo certified gold in the country, selling over 20,000 copies.

== Track listing ==
All tracks were produced by Paco de Lucía.

Canción Andaluza
No.	Title	Writer(s)	Length
1.	"Maria de la O"	Miguel Manuel López Quiroga; Rafael de León Arias de Saavedra; Salvador Federico Valverde	3:56
2.	"Ojos Verdes"	López Quiroga; Arias de Saavedra; Valverde	4:46
3.	"Romance de Valentía"	Antonio Quintero; López Quiroga; Arias de Saavedra	4:03
4.	"Te He de Querer Mientras Viva" (with Estrella Morente)	López Quiroga; Arias de Saavedra	3:36
5.	"La Chiquita Piconera"	López Quiroga; Nicolás Callejón López; Arias de Saavedra	3:22
6.	"Zambra Gitana" (with Parrita)	Quintero; López Quiroga; Arias de Saavedra	4:06
7.	"Quiroga por Bulerías"	Quintero; López Quiroga; Arias de Saavedra	6:10
8.	"Señorita" (with Oscar D'León)	Juan Solano Pedrero; Arias de Saavedra	5:52
Total length:			35:50

== Charts ==
=== Weekly charts ===
Weekly chart performance for Canción Andaluza
Chart (2014)	Peak position
Spanish Albums (PROMUSICAE)	1

=== Year-end charts ===
Year-end chart performance for Canción Andaluza
Chart (2014)	Position
Spanish Albums (PROMUSICAE)	41

== Certifications ==
Certifications for Canción Andaluza
Region	Certification	Certified units/sales
Spain (PROMUSICAE)	Gold	20,000^{^}
^{^} Shipments figures based on certification alone.
