= Rafael Riqueni =

Spanish musician

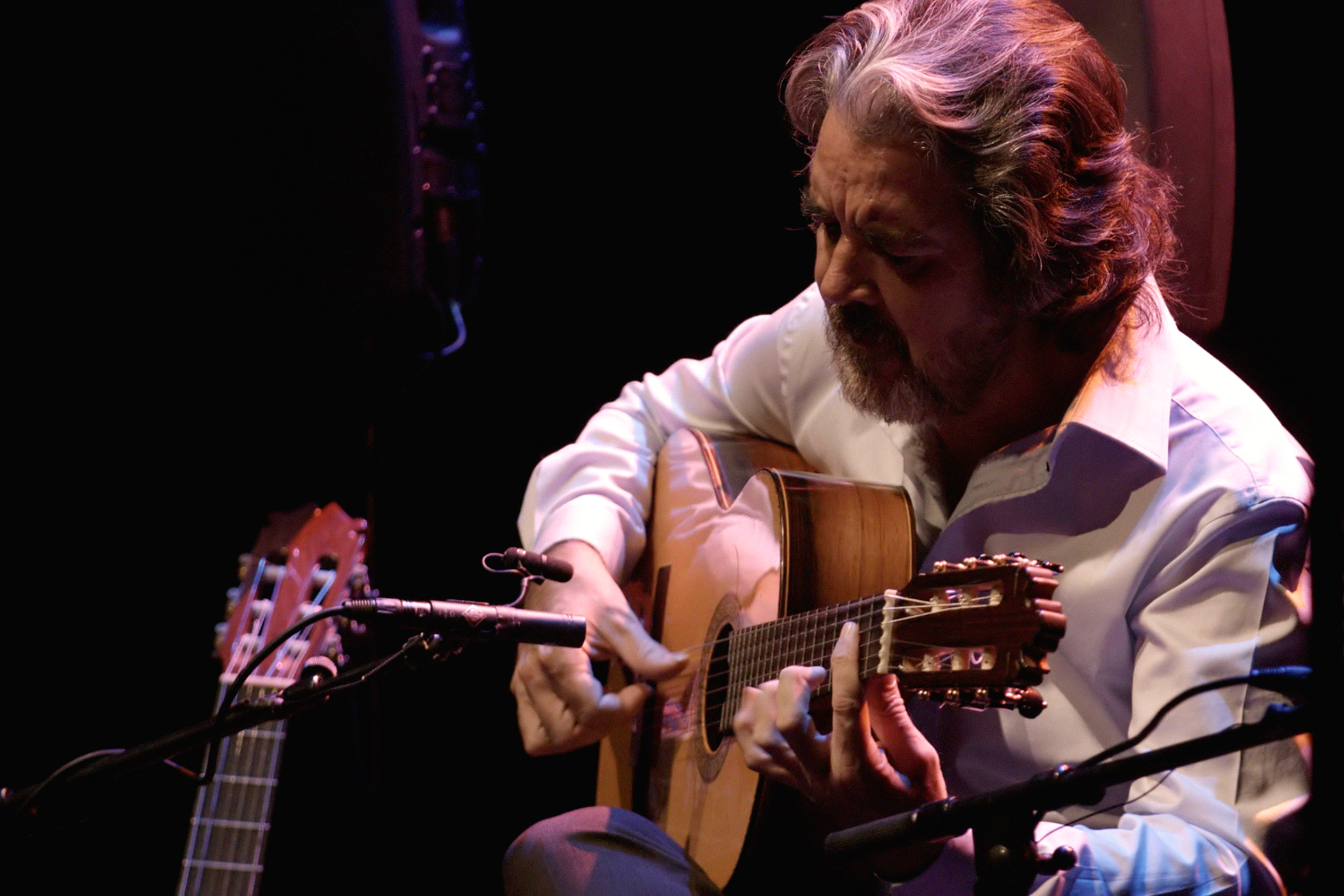
- Riqueni performing in 2016

Background information
- Born: Rafael Riqueni del Canto; 16 August 1962; Sevilla, Spain
- Genres: Flamenco; Classical
- Occupations: Guitarist; Composer
- Instrument: Guitar
- Years active: 1974–present
- Website: www.rafael-riqueni.com

Rafael Riqueni del Canto (Sevilla, August 16, 1962), is a Spanish guitar player and composer. He is considered as one of the biggest names or “Maestros” in flamenco guitar history. At age fourteen, he won the two main national awards for flamenco guitar in Spain. As an adult, he has won the most prestigious flamenco music awards in Spain, including: Premio Andalucía de Cultura, Premio Nacional de la Crítica, Giraldillo a la Maestría de la XVIII Bienal de Flamenco y el Premio AIE. In 2017, he was awarded with XXXI Compás del Cante, this award is always referred to by the Spanish media as the "Flamenco Nobel prize".

== Biography ==
=== Early life ===
Rafael Riqueni was born in Sevilla on August 16, 1962, in Fabie St at Triana, Riqueni also spend part of his childhood at El Arenal, he lived in the same building there than Francisco Palacios El Pali. Riqueni was an early and gifted musician, he had a big creative capacity that started to cause sensation as a child. At age eleven, he started to play with Niño Ricardo records, then he discovered Paco de Lucía and that made him finally decide to pursue a career in music. His first teacher was Manolo Carmona, and then he became a student of Manolo Sanlúcar.

=== Career (1974–2019) ===
==== Early career ====
Rafael Riqueni gave his first concerts at age twelve, at the Educación y Descanso Festivals. At age thirteen, he stood out during a solo concert at a flamenco festival in Teatro Lope de Vega. One year later, in 1977, Riqueni won the Ramón Montoya concert guitar prize at VIII Concurso de Arte Flamenco de Córdoba, causing a big impression with his performance, y del VI Certamen Nacional de Guitarra de Jerez de la Frontera, considerados los dos principales premios nacionales de guitarra. La consecución de los mismos fue el comienzo de su carrera profesional, una de sus principales cualidades era la búsqueda de un estilo personal y alejado de las escuelas dominantes en la guitarra flamenca.

In 1979, he toured with Isabel Pantoja's company. In 1981, he again won first prize in the X Jerez National guitar contest. In 1982, he was on tour with Rocío Jurado.

In 1984, he took part in the III Bienal de Flamenco de Sevilla opening concert, where he played “Sevilla “ from Albéniz along four compositions of his own. In that same Bienal de Flamenco edition, he was one of the finalist contenders for the Giraldillo del Toque guitar contest, along with Tomatito, Pedro Bacán, Jose Antonio Rodríguez, Paco del Gastor and Manolo Franco, who won the contest.

As part of the V Cordoba International guitar festival, in 1985, Riqueni offered a concert together with Manolo Franco and Enrique de Melchor under the name of Jovenes Figuras de la Guitarra Flamenca. That same year, Riqueni participated in the II Madrid Cumbre Flamenca Festival with the show Luces de Chacón, together with Enrique Morente, Carmen Linares and Manolo Sanlúcar among other artists. During the III Cumbre Flamenca Festival, he gave a concert together with José Antonio Rodriguez y Gerardo Núñez, under the name of Empujando. Also in 1986, Riqueni played a solo concert in the Los Veranos de la Villa Festival in Madrid, and offered two solo concerts in the Fráncfort Opera Theater.

==== Juego de Niños (1986) ====
Riqueni published his first record in 1986, Juego de Niños, with producer Ricardo Pachón, who was well known for his previous work with Camarón de la Isla among other important flamenco artists. The flamenco guitar specialist Norberto Torres stated in his book that Juego de Niños is suggesting a new and different musical order for flamenco”, this album also settled the basis for Rafael Riqueni's style. One of the most prominent pieces is ”Al Niño Miguel”, a tribute to the late guitar player from Huelva, Norberto Torres said ” The intro part of this piece is a total new concept for Fandango (flamenco style), Riqueni was using minor key harmonies before going for the cadencia andaluza".

==== Flamenco (1987) ====
In 1987, and as a foreign policies ministry endorsement, Riqueni was representing Spain for a series of International music festivals, he also toured in Germany. During this German tour, he was offered there to record an album with the same music he was playing in concert, and Flamenco became his second album, a solo guitar record. The famous flamenco producer José Manuel Gamboa said in his book that: Flamenco is a real lesson on flamenco playing and composition. The Minera (flamenco style) included in the album, is probably the best Minera in history”, and Norberto Torres in Historia de la Guitarra Flamenca said that “Riqueni made a real solo guitar record, without overdubs, he showed to aficionados and specially to guitar players, all his virtuous qualities as a composer and concert player. This album contains true gems for flamenco concert guitar, with the Minera he achieves a perfect balance between his flamenco and classical background, at the same time that his melodic characteristic style gets here to the highest level”.

In 1989, Riqueni composed the soundtrack for La Reina Andaluza, the first play offered by the Andalusian Theater institute. The premiere was held at the Teatro Imperial in Sevilla.

==== Mi Tiempo (1990) ====
Mi Tiempo, was published in 1990, and became of the most celebrated and influential albums in Riqueni's discography. A record in where he brought classical and jazz influences to his music, including string arrangements that were composed by Riqueni as well. One of the most prominent pieces of the album is “Y Enamorarse”, an Alegría flamenco Style in e minor, in where Riqueni uses novelty harmonies for flamenco, and covers every cadencia andaluza derivate music mode that guitar players have been using along the whole flamenco guitar history.

Mi Tiempo premiere concert was held in Seville at the VI Bienal de Flamenco.

==== Suite Sevilla (1992) ====
Suite Sevilla was published in 1992, and is again one of the most important records in Rafael Riqueni´ discography, it was one of the very few encounters between flamenco and classical. Suite Sevilla was inspired by flamenco roots but it was created under a classical concept in the tradition of Nacionalismo musical, a genre related to musical romanticism from the XIX century. Mainly Falla, Turina, Granados and Albéniz made this style popular in Spain. Suite Sevilla is a Riqueni composition for two guitars, and the album was recorded by Riqueni and classical guitarist José Maria Gallardo del Rey, they both toured the album. The premiere of Suite Sevilla was held at the Houston International Festival in 1993, later in October, the Spanish premiere was held in Reales Alcazares, Seville.

In July of that same year, Rafael Riqueni staged a concert for guitar and orchestra during the XIII Córdoba International Guitar Festival, with Leo Brouwer as a director; Gipsy Concert was the unreleased last work by Sabicas with F. Cofiner orchestra arrangements.

In 1994, Riqueni performed at Los Tarantos Hall in Barcelona, he continued touring with José Maria Gallardo and Suite Sevilla. In March he went on a South American tour that took him to Chile, Perú, Brasil and Argentina. That same year he played in a series of Festivals including VIII Andres Segovia International Festival in Madrid, VII International La Habana guitar Festival, V European Jazz Mostra in Barcelona, XIV Córdoba International Guitar Festival, in a concert with Tomatito. During the San Sebastian Film Festival, he played a live soundtrack for La Mujer y el Pelele. He also was part of the VIII Seville Bienal de Flamenco in where he participated in De la Luna al Viento together with María Pagés y Carmen Linares. This concert was one of the biggest festival hits. In "Guia Libre del Flamenco", José Manuel Gamboa talked about this concert “As a result of Riqueni´s study of Nacionalismo Musical authors, his cover of “Amarguras” from Font de Anta is a fantastic work, when he played this piece at Maestranza Theater during the Bienal de Flamenco, the crowd went into a total commotion”. In November, Riqueni offered two shows in Prague and Bratislava.

==== Maestros (1994) ====
At the end of 1994, Riqueni released a new album, Maestros, produced by Enrique Morente, who was creating a new label,“Discos Probeticos”, and Maestros was his first release. With this Album Rafael Riqueni pays tribute to three historic guitar players, he recorded different covers from Niño Ricardo, Sabicas and Esteban de Sanlúcar. Riqueni closed the album with a song with Enrique Morente, “Estrella Amargura”, based on the previous “Amarguras” cover performed at Bienal de Flamenco.

In 1995, Rafael Riqueni and María Pages performed together at The Point Theater in Dublin, during six nights in a row, as part of Riverdance, a popular musical play. Riqueni also offered a solo concert in Dublin promoted by the Spanish embassy. That same year he performed together with Pedro Iturralde at the Flamenco Jazz Festival in Teatro Albéniz, Madrid. Again in 1995, He played for three nights in a row at Teatro Alfil in Madrid, and participated in the film, Flamenco, by Carlos Saura,

Later in December, he received the Andalucía de Cultura award by Junta de Andalucía president Manuel Chaves.

==== Alcázar de Cristal (1996) ====
On February 29, 1996, Riqueni started in Sevilla the tour of his new album, Alcázar de Cristal, This first show had Maria Pagés as special guest. One of the most famous pieces of the album was "Calle Fabié", a piece that included string arrangements by Rafael Riqueni, and was dedicated to his father memory.

In July, he performed with Alcázar de Cristal at the 45 International Granada Music and dance Festival. and the XVI Cordoba International guitar Festival. In September, he performed in IX Bienal de Flamenco.

In 1997, he performed at the IX Mont de Martsan Flamenco Festival in France. Also in 1997, Riqueni was part of the Andalusia Day commemorative concert in Teatro de la Zarzuela, Madrid, with José Mercé, Esperanza Fernández, Tomatito, Moraito Chico and J.M. Evora. He also played in Havana, Cuba in a Festival with Lebrijano, Familia Fernandez and Manolo Soler.

=== Comeback (2014) ===
In 1997, Riqueni went practically on retirement due to health problems, from that point he only offered some shows in very specific occasions. In 2002, a fund raising festival for medical treatment was held in Madrid, with the performances of Enrique Morente, Carmen Linares, José Mercé and Enrique de Melchor among other artists.

In 2006, Rafael Riqueni performed with Enrique Morente at the 30th Vitoria Jazz Festival and VII Flamenco Pa To's Festival in Madrid. In 2011, Riqueni played in one leg of the Pablo de Málaga tour, an album by Enrique Morente.

In 2011, press announced that Rafael Riqueni is working on a new album, his first since 1996. And Paco Bech is shooting a documentary movie about Riqueni with the participation of Tomatito, Enrique de Melchor, Estrella Morente, Juan Manuel Cañizares and Serranito among other artists. This new album will be called Parque de María Luisa and is a conceptual work about the author memories of youth in this monument park in Sevilla.

Riqueni announced his comeback for the XVIII Bienal de Flamenco, in 2014, where he performed at Lope de Vega Theater with Y Sevilla…, a show together with Antonio Canales, Segundo Falcón, Manolo Franco y Paco Jarana. Rafael Riqueni was one of the most celebrated performers of this Bienal de Flamenco edition and achieved the “Giraldillo a la Maestria” Bienal's award.

In July 2015, Riqueni went to prison, due to a misdemeanor committed in 2010 and directly related to his health problems back then, he was successfully recovered from these health issues since 2013. Riqueni was released on parole in October 2015. In November 2015, he premiered in concert Parque de María Luisa at Teatro de la Maestranza in Seville, with the artistic direction of Paco Bech. The press unanimously acclaimed the concert. ABC stated that the concert was the biggest musical hit in Seville in decades.

==== Parque de María Luisa (2017) ====
In June 2017, Parque de María Luisa was published with Universal Music, the album was produced by Paco Bech and Joselito Acedo. It's the seventh album in Rafael Riqueni's discography and it was published twenty one years after his previous record, Alcázar de Cristal (1996). Parque de María Luisa got excellent reviews after release. Dario de Sevilla said it was a masterpiece. The album premiere was held at Suma Flamenca Festival in Madrid, with the artistic direction of Paco Bech, the concert was a big success and achieved excellent reviews. Parque de Maria Luisa entered the top ten of best albums in Spain during 2017 for ABC newspaper. For El País, Parque de María Luisa was the best Flamenco record in 2017. The album was number tree for the Notodo.com best albums list in Spain during 2017, notodo.com said: This is the latest flamenco guitar masterpiece, and we doubt if there will be ever another one at this level.

In 2019, Universal Music released a double vinyl edition of "Parque the María Luisa" with seven previously unreleased tracks. On march 9th, Rafael Riqueni offered a Parque de María Luisa concert with special guests: Arcángel, Ana Guerra, Diana Navarro, Dorantes, Antonio Canales y Rocío Molina. The concert was held at Cartuja Center Sevilla.

=== Musical aspects ===
Rafael Riqueni's music takes flamenco as a basis, plus classical music influences among other contemporary styles, a process easy to identify with his first album, and definitely stated in Mi Tiempo. In flamenco guitar specialist Norberto Torres words: “Riqueni´s music is close to romanticism aesthetics with factors like: contrast to previous musical forms and modes, difficult and expanded processes, sentimentalism, and a new concept for harmonies, rhythm, melody and design. Ramón Rodo Sellés, talks about innate musicality and unique playing style

One of Riqueni´s main characteristic is his capacity as a solo concert player, without the need of a backing group. Riqueni is also considered to have developed a personal style away from the dominant Paco de Lucia spectrum in flamenco contemporary guitar.

Rafael Riqueni has done an extensive use of musical notation in his work.

== Discography ==
=== Studio albums ===
Title	Album details
Juego de Niños	Released: 1986; Label: Nuevos Medios; Formats: LP, CD; Produced by Ricardo Pachón
Flamenco	Released: 1987; Label: Blue Angel; Formats: LP, CD
Mi Tiempo	Released: 1990; Label: Nuevos Medios; Formats: LP, CD
Suite Sevilla	Released: 1992; Label: JMS; Formats: CD
Maestros	Released: 1994; Label: Discos Probeticos; Formats: CD; Produced by Enrique Morente, with his collaboration in one song
Alcázar de Cristal	Released: 1996; Label: Auvidis; Formats: CD
Parque de María Luisa	Released: 2017; Label: Universal Music Spain; Formats: CD; Produced by Paco Bech y Joselito Acedo. With collaborations by Estrella Morente, Raimundo Amador and Juan José Amador.
Parque de María Luisa. Double vinyl special edition	Released: 2019; Label: Universal Music Spain; Formats: LP; Contains seven new tracks, with previously unreleased songs from the album sessions.
‘’Herencia’’	Released: 2021; Label: Universal Music Spain; Format: CD

=== Collaborations ===
- Pata Negra. Blues de la Frontera (1987)
- Cantores de Híspalis. Por la Paz (1988)
- Vargas Blues Band. Madrid-Memphis (1992)
- Bill Whelan. Riverdance, Music from the Show (1995)
- Vicente Soto "Sordera". Tríptico Flamenco: Sevilla (1996)
- Carmen Linares. La Mujer en el Cante (1996)
- Niña Pastori. Entre dos Puertos (1996)
- Enrique Morente. La Estrella (1996)
- Carlos Núñez. A Irmandale Das Estrelas (1996)
- Carlos Núñez. Os Amores Libres (1999)
- Estrella Morente. Mujeres (2006)
- Enrique Morente. Pablo de Málaga (2009)
- Enrique Morente. Flamenco en Directo (2009)
- Enrique Morente. Morente+Flamenco (2010)
- Enrique Morente. Morente B.S.O. (2011)
- Kiki Morente. Albayzín (2017)
