= Antonio Rey =

Spanish flamenco guitarist and composer (born 1981)

Antonio Rey dichi
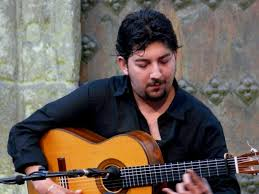

Background information
- Born: Antonio Rey Navas; 1981 (age 43–44)
- Origin: Jerez de la Frontera, Spain
- Genres: Flamenco
- Occupation(s): Guitarist, composer
- Instrument: Guitar
- Website: www.antoniorey.org

Antonio Rey Navas (Madrid, born 9 March 1981) is a Spanish flamenco guitarist and composer. He is a winner of several national and international flamenco guitar competitions including the Concurso Nacional de Arte Flamenco de Córdoba (National Competition of the Art of Flamenco of Córdoba), the Concurso Nacional de Guitarra Flamenca Niño Ricardo (Niño Ricardo National Competition of Flamenco Guitar) and the Concurso Internacional de Guitarra Flamenca Los Cernícalos de Jerez (International Flamenco Guitar Competition in Kestrels, Jerez).

== Biography ==
Antonio Rey Navas was born in Madrid in 1981 and began his artistic career at the age of ten when he accompanied his father Tony Rey in various tablaos (flamenco venues) in Mexico. A few years later, he made his first tour of Japan with the dancer Yoko Komatsubara. At eighteen years of age, he worked in the company of Antonio Canales and later composed the music for Gallo de pelea for the Nuevo Ballet Español (New Spanish Ballet). Rey composed other compositions, such as "Romeo and Juliet", for the Antonio Canales which was founded in 1996 by Angel Rojas and Carlos Rodriguez. He went on to perform in the capacity of accompanist for singers and dancers Manuela Carrasco, Rafael Amargo, Farruquito and singers Rafael de Utrera and La Tana, among others.

In 2003, he obtained first prize accompanying singers at the Festival de Cantes de Mina de La Unión competition in Murcia. In 2010, he won first prize in the Concurso Nacional de Arte Flamenco de Córdoba (National Competition of the Art of Flamenco of Córdoba). He also won the Concurso Nacional de Guitarra Flamenca Niño Ricardo (Niño Ricardo National Competition of Flamenco Guitar), the Premio del Certamen Nacional de Guitarra Flamenca de L´Hospitalet de Llobrega (National Flameno Guitar competition of L´Hospitalet de Llobregat) as well as the Concurso Internacional de Guitarra Flamenca Los Cernícalos de Jerez (international flamenco guitar competition in Jerez.) His first album was produced by Gerardo Núñez and is entitled A través de Ti. On his second album Colores de Fuego (Colors of Fire) he collaborated with Estrella Morente, Vicente Amigo and Josemi Carmona, among others.

In 2020 he was the winner of the 'Best Flamenco Album' category in the 21st Latin Grammy Award's for his album Flamenco Sin Fronteras.
