= Juan Habichuela =

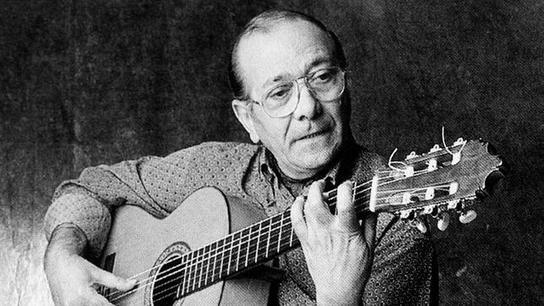
- Juan Habichuela, flamenco guitarist

Background information
- Also known as: Juan Habichuela
- Born: Juan Carmona Carmona; 1933; Granada, Spain
- Died: 30 June 2016 (aged 82–83) Madrid, Spain
- Genres: Flamenco
- Occupation: Guitar instrumentalist
- Instrument: Flamenco guitar

Juan Habichuela (né Juan Carmona Carmona; 1933 – 30 June 2016) was a Spanish flamenco guitarist who began his artistic life as a dancer, and later learned guitar from his father and from a guitarist from Granada known as Ovejilla. He accompanied some of the most famous singers of the time such as Manolo Caracol, Juan Valderrama, Fosforito, and Enrique Morente. He was nominated for the Latin Grammy Award for Best Flamenco Album in 2000. Habichuela received the Latin Grammy Trustees Award in 2012 for "significant contributions, other than performance, to the field of recording during their careers".

== Biography ==
Habichuela belonged to a flamenco dynasty which began with his grandfather, known as "Old Habichuela" and which was continued by his father and brothers Pepe, Carlos and Luis. While very young he moved to Madrid where he performed in various flamenco shows (tablaos flamencos) accompanying Mario Maya. He is the older brother of Pepe Habichuela and the father of Juan José Carmona and Antonio Carmona. They formed the musical group Ketama together with José Miguel Carmona Niño, son of Pepe Habichuela. Juan Habichuela died in Madrid on 30 June 2016.

== Discography ==
- Habas contadas. This is a double disc compilation that consists of 25 flamenco forms (Toques) recorded between 1962 and 2007. Among the singers he accompanied are Manolo Caracol, Chano Lobato, Rancapino and Jose Merce.
