= Las Migas =

Spanish popular music group

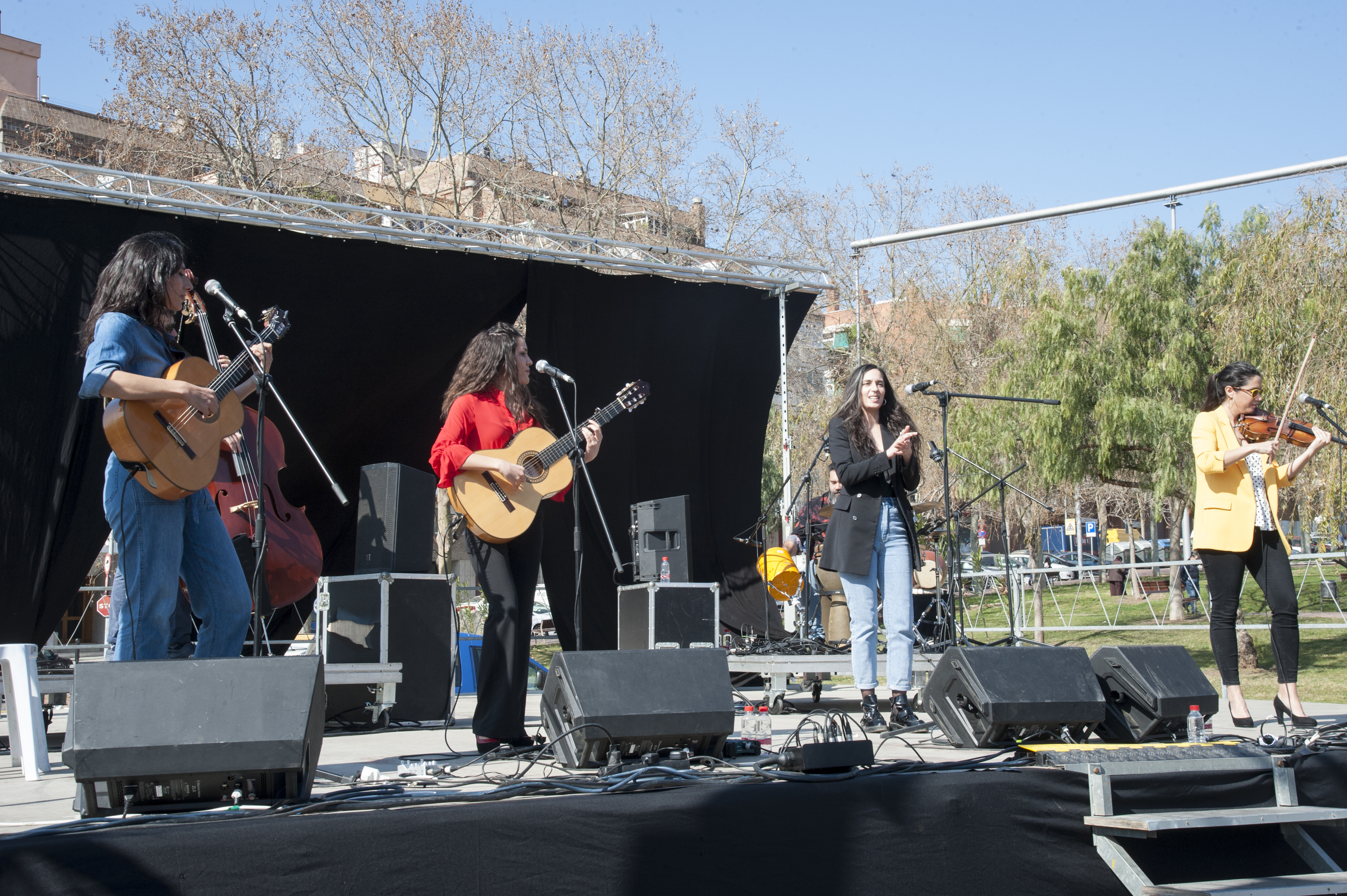
- Las Migas in concert, 2019

Background information
- Origin: Barcelona, Spain
- Genres: New flamenco, fusion, rumba
- Instruments: Vocals, guitars, violin
- Years active: 2004-present
- Labels: Concert Music Entertainment, Nuevos Medios, Chesapik
- Members: Marta Robles; Paula Ramírez; Alicia Grillo; Laura Pacios
- Past members: Sílvia Pérez Cruz; Alba Carmona; Begoña Salazar; Carolina Fernández La Chispa; Isabelle Laudenbach; Lisa Bause; Roser Loscos
- Website: http://www.lasmigas.com

Las Migas is a Spanish all-female popular music quartet formed in Barcelona in 2004. Their music is based on traditional flamenco forms, frequently combined with a diverse set of musical styles including country, pop, urban music, bluegrass, folk, rumba, jazz, and classical music. Notably, the band members participate in playing instruments, composition, and songwriting that extend beyond the limited roles traditionally assigned to women in flamenco since the early 20th century. Former members of Las Migas who have gone on to have solo musical careers include Sílvia Pérez Cruz and Alba Carmona. They have won the Latin Grammy Award for Best Flamenco Album twice, for Libres in 2022 and for Flamencas in 2025.

== History and career ==
The name of the band, Las Migas, translates as "The Bread Crumbs" and refers to migas, a popular dish. The four musicians started their career in 2004 in Barcelona, when Marta Robles (guitar), Sílvia Pérez Cruz (vocals), Isabelle Laudenbach (guitar) and violinist Lisa Bause founded the group. The first three had been students at the Escuela Superior de Música de Cataluña.

In 2010, they released their first album titled Reinas del matute, with lyrics by Spanish poets Federico García Lorca and Rafael Alberti and produced by Raül Refree. At the end of July 2011, Sílvia Pérez Cruz left the group to focus on her own projects.

Subsequently, Las Migas presented their new lead singer Alba Carmona, who had worked as a backing vocalist on the album Reinas del matute, and who added a more traditional flamenco style to their repertoire. At the beginning of 2012, the group's second album Nosotras somos was released and presented live on a tour in Catalonia, southern Spain and Madrid.

In January 2013, Lisa Bause, who had played with the group since its beginnings in 2004, was replaced by Roser Loscos on violin. In December of the same year, Isabelle Laudenbach left and was replaced by guitarist Alicia Grillo from Córdoba. In November 2016, they released Vente conmigo, the first work by the new line-up with Marta Robles, Alicia Grillo, Roser Loscos and Alba Carmona. Most of the songs were their own compositions, with Spanish singer Miguel Poveda making a guest appearance on one of the songs.

In February 2018, Alba Carmona embarked on her solo career and was replaced as vocalist by Begoña Salazar, with whom they released the album Cuatro in 2019. Since May 2019, the lead singer has been Carolina Fernández, nicknamed "La Chispa" (The Spark). In 2022, they released their album Libres with the collaboration of Spanish singers Estrella Morente, María Peláe and flamenco guitarist Tomatito. In November 2022, this album won Best Flamenco Album honors at the 23rd Annual Latin Grammy Awards gala in Las Vegas.

In August 2022 Roser Loscos left the band and was replaced by Laura Pacios on violin and backing vocals. In 2024, they produced their new album called Rumberas, presenting different styles of the Rumba genre and paying tribute to iconic musical artists such as Rosario, Lola Flores and Celia Cruz. In February 2024, the BBC World Service radio show "The Arts Hour on Tour" presented Las Migas live from Madrid.

In 2025, they moved closer to traditional flamenco with the release of their album Flamencas, which was coproduced by Oriol Riart and features collaborations with flamenco guitarist Juan Carmona, flamenco percussionist Paquito González, and Galician trio Tanxugueiras. In July 2025, Carolina Fernández La Chispa left the band and was replaced as lead vocalist by Paula Ramírez from Seville. In November 2025, Flamencas won Best Flamenco Album honors at the 26th Annual Latin Grammy Awards gala in Las Vegas.

== Discography ==
=== Albums ===
- Reinas del matute (2010), with Sílvia Pérez Cruz on vocals.
- Nosotras somos (2012), with Alba Carmona on vocals.
- Vente conmigo (2016), with Alba Carmona on vocals.
- Cuatro (2019), with Begoña Salazar on vocals.
- Libres (2022), with Carolina Fernández La Chispa on vocals.
- Rumberas (2024), with Carolina Fernández La Chispa on vocals.
- Flamencas (2025), with Carolina Fernández La Chispa on vocals.

=== Video clips ===
- Perdóname Luna, from the album Reinas del matute (2010)
- La Guitarrina, from the album Nosotras somos (2012)
- Gitana Hechicera (2014)
- Calma, from the album Vente conmigo (2016)

== Awards and recognition ==
- 2020 - Independent Music Award (MIN) for Best Flamenco Album
- 2022 - "Best Flamenco Album" at the 23rd Annual Latin Grammy Awards
- 2025 - "Best Flamenco Album" at the 26th Annual Latin Grammy Awards
