= Hands (Dave Holland and Pepe Habichuela album) =

Studio album by Dave Holland and Pepe Habichuela
- Released: October 5, 2010
- Recorded: March 16–20, 2009
- Studios: CATA Studio, Madrid
- Genre: Flamenco
- Length: 56:38
- Label: Dare2 (EmArcy/Universal)
- Producers: Dave Holland; Josemi Carmona

Dave Holland chronology
Pathways (2010)	Hands (2010)	Prism (2013)

Pepe Habichuela chronology
Nuevos Medios Colección (2003)	Hands (2010)

Hands is a 2010 album by English jazz double bassist Dave Holland and Spanish flamenco guitarist Pepe Habichuela. The unlikely pairing was arranged by Manuel Ignacio Ferrand Augustin, the director of musical events for the Cultural Department of Andalusia. The first meeting took place in 2007, with four days of rehearsals, followed by three concerts. The group was expanded in May 2008 and recorded Hands in March 2009, and released on Holland's own label Dare2. Eight of the ten tracks on the album were written by Pepe Habichuela based on the flamenco tradition, while Holland contributes two originals. It is the last album released by Habichuela during his lifetime.

== Reception ==
Professional ratings
Review scores
Source	Rating
All About Jazz	5/5 stars
AllMusic	4/5 stars
The Daily Telegraph	4/5 stars
Financial Times	4/5 stars
The Guardian	4/5 stars
Tom Hull	B+

The Guardian called Holland's sound, "a natural for this richly sonorous idiom." Chris May of All About Jazz called Hands, "an elegant, lyrical, rhythmically spicy blend of jazz and flamenco in which flamenco gets top billing. The Allmusic review by Chris Nickson awarded the album 4 stars, stating, "It's Habichuela's magical fingers that mesmerize, covering the scales as adroitly as any pianist and bringing a rich fullness and a stunning imagination to the sound. But what's really at work here is a group consciousness, an exploration of flamenco, and the listener shares Holland's journey. There's nothing here that's diluted – this is hardcore flamenco, very much the real thing – and the hard realism is one of the great pleasures." Mike Hobart writing for Financial Times commented, "The confidence with which bassist Holland negotiates the set-piece rhythms of authentic flamenco reflect several years of immersion in Iberian culture and tradition. Holland underpins the traditional flamenco quintet, adding the occasional jazzy inflection, seamless solos and a brace of Latin inflected originals." David Luhrssen of the Shepherd Express noted, "The cool undertow of Holland’s acoustic bass lends a slight pull of restraint to the fiery Habichuela, helping cast the collection of quietly emotive instrumentals in the emotional key of determined melancholy."

== Track listing ==
All tracks are written by José Antonio Carmona except as noted.

No.	Title	Writer(s)	Length
1.	"Hands (Fandango de Huelva)"	José Antonio Carmona; José Miguel Carmona	5:58
2.	"Subi la cuesta (Tangos)"		5:00
3.	"Camarón (Taranta)"		5:42
4.	"The Whirling Dervish"	Dave Holland	7:32
5.	"Yesqueros (Media granaína)"		3:22
6.	"El ritmo me lleva (Rumba)"		5:52
7.	"Bailaor (Seguiriya cabal)"		9:01
8.	"Joyride"	Holland	5:30
9.	"Puente quebrao (Bulería)"		5:37
10.	"My Friend Dave (Soleá)"		3:03
Total length:			56:38

== Personnel ==
- Dave Holland – double bass
- Pepe Habichuela – guitar
- Josemi Carmona – guitar
- Carlos Carmona – guitar
- Israel Porrina (Piraña) – cajón and percussion
- Juan Carmona – cajón and percussion

== Charts ==
Chart (2010)	Peak position
Greek Albums (IFPI)	31
French Albums (SNEP)	132
Spanish Albums (Promusicae)	52
