= Prism (Dave Holland album) =

Studio album by Dave Holland
- Released: September 2, 2013
- Recorded: August 9–10, 2012
- Studio: Sear Sound, New York City
- Genre: Jazz
- Length: 1:09:43
- Label: Dare2
- Producer: Dave Holland, Louise Holland

Dave Holland chronology
Hands (2010)	Prism (2013)	The Art of Conversation (2014)

Professional ratings
Review scores
Source	Rating
All About Jazz	4.5/5 stars
Allmusic	4/5 stars
The Daily Telegraph	4/5 stars
Financial Times	4/5 stars
The Guardian	4/5 stars
Jazzwise	4/5 stars
PopMatters	8/10
Tom Hull	B+

Prism is a studio album by English jazz bassist Dave Holland. The record was released via the Dare2 label on September 2, 2013. This album is a milestone of Dave Holland's career as a leader—the forty year anniversary of his debut, the album Conference of the Birds released in 1973. Prism contains nine original compositions written by bandmembers.

== Reception ==
John Fordham of The Guardian noted "The great double bassist and bandleader Dave Holland and his star-packed Prism quartet reveal a considerably louder, bluesier identity than his other tight-knit acoustic outfits over the past 30 years. With guitarist Kevin Eubanks relishing his return to the jazz spotlight after a long stint on the Tonight Show, the brilliant Craig Taborn switching between acoustic piano and Fender Rhodes, Charles Lloyd drummer Eric Harland playing updated jazz-rock patterns with a ferocious relish, and everybody contributing tunes, this band has a one-for-all collective drive that's already generating album-of-the-year mutterings". Lloyd Sachs of JazzTimes commented "You get the feeling, hearing the quartet put a sonic charge in the tune, that they have been itching to loosen their ties stylistically-particularly Holland, who is known for dotting i’s and crossing t’s in arranging for his stellar acoustic bands, and Eubanks, after 15 years of buttoning down as leader of the Tonight Show Band".

Will Layman of PopMatters stated "It’s a great record. Part of what makes Prism sound specifically like “fusion” is the preponderance of tunes that do not “swing” in the usual sense but are instead built on tricky riffs that interlock with a groove that is heavy on backbeat. The opener, Eubanks’ “The Watcher”, begins with a funky line from the left hand of Taborn's Fender Rhodes electric piano, and then Eubanks doubles it before he climbs on top with a distorted but very simple melody. The sound is thick with fuzz and buzz from both Eubanks and Taborn. All of it would make for a satisfying track, but then a tricky and precise bridge section comes along for pleasing relief. Taborn's solo is the standout here: mathematical and intriguing as it moves and reverses, surges forward and doubles-back on itself". Doug Colette writing for Glide Magazine commented, "The line between composition and improvisation becomes increasingly blurred as the album plays, illustrating how ideal is the name of this unit: as with the tool that simultaneously unifies and splits light, this group manages to play together and solo in such a way the distinction blurs between those two approaches as well."

== Track listing ==
No.	Title	Writer(s)	Length
1.	"The Watcher"	Eubanks	6:56
2.	"The Empty Chair (For Clare)"	Holland	8:31
3.	"Spirals"	Taborn	8:46
4.	"Choir"	Harland	4:49
5.	"The Color of Iris"	Eubanks	7:27
6.	"A New Day"	Holland	7:51
7.	"The True Meaning of Determination"	Taborn	9:19
8.	"Evolution"	Eubanks	10:24
9.	"Breathe"	Harland	5:40
Total length:			1:09:43

== Personnel ==
Band

- Dave Holland – bass, producer
- Eric Harland – drums
- Kevin Eubanks – guitar
- Craig Taborn – piano, electric piano

Production

- Kevin Byrd – artwork
- Susan Archie – design
- James Farber – engineer
- Chris Allen – assistant engineer
- Ted Tuthill – assistant engineer
- Louise Holland – executive producer
- Greg Calbi – mastering
- Ulli Gruber – photography
