= Cositas Buenas =

Studio album by Paco de Lucía
- Released: 2004
- Genre: Flamenco
- Label: Blue Thumb Records

Cositas Buenas is an album featuring Paco de Lucía and directed by Paco de Lucía with the collaboration of Javier Limón. It was released in 2004 labelled "Blue Thumb Records", by Universal Music Spain S.L.

The album has four bulerías, two rumba tracks, a tangos and a tientos. The album won the Latin Grammy Award for Best Flamenco Album.

== Track listing ==
1. "Patio Custodio" - Bulerías 4:44
2. "Cositas Buenas" (Good little things) - Tangos 4:23
3. "Antonia" - Bulería por Soleá 6:28
4. "El Dengue" - Rumba 4:03
5. "Volar" - Bulerías 5:30
6. "El Tesorillo" (The little treasure) - Tientos 4:39
7. "Que Venga el Alba" - Bulerías 4:11
8. "Casa Bernardo" - Rumba 4:12

== Artists ==
- Paco de Lucía - Guitar, vocal, lute, mandolin, bouzouki
- Piraña - Percussion
- Guadiana, Antonio el Negro, Montse Cortés, Tana, Potito, Ángela Bautista, and Paco - Palmas and Chorus
- Diego El Cigala - vocals on "El tesorillo"
- Tomatito- Guitar
- Alain Pérez- Bass on Casa Bernardo (Rumba)

== Design ==
- Flamenkos
