= Juan Pinilla =

Spanish flamenco singer and writer

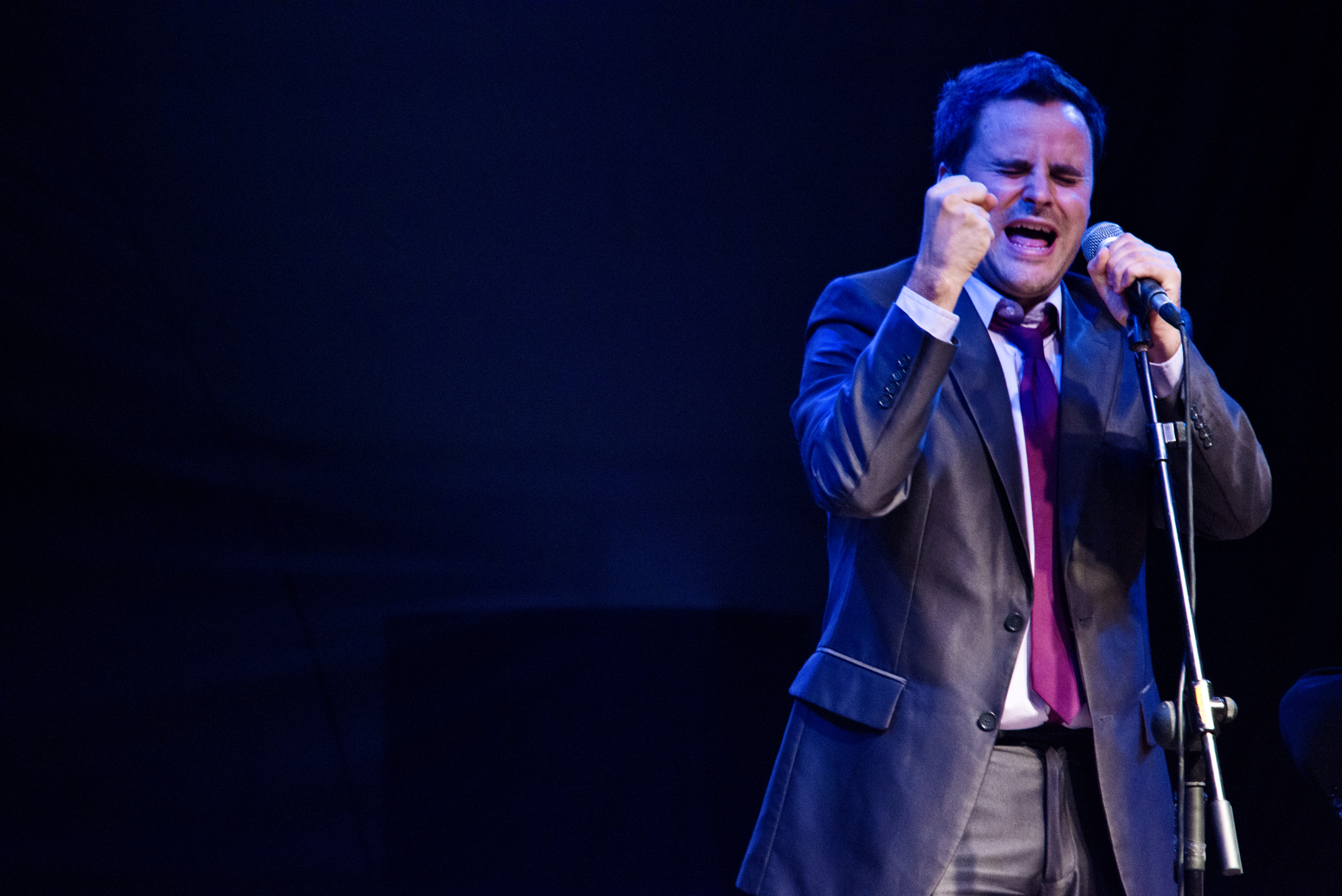
- Born: Juan Pinilla Martín; 2 January 1981; Huétor-Tájar, Granada, Andalusia, Spain
- Occupations: Flamenco singer, writer, journalist

Juan Pinilla Martin (Huétor-Tájar, January 2, 1981) is a flamenco singer from Granada (Spain), critic, writer and columnist. In August, 2007 he won the Festival del Cante de las Minas, with the prize Lámpara Minera 2007, considered the most important flamenco prize. He studied Translation and Interpretation. At present he studies Law. In 2014, he was nominated for the prestigious Latin Grammy Awards (Las Vegas, USA) In 2016 he was awarded the title of favorite son of the province of Granada (Spain) He is an artist committed with the social reasons. The night he won the Lámpara Minera he dedicated the prize to the workers victims of the workplaces accidents.

== Biography ==
Although he came later, Juan Pinilla belongs to an important younger generation of artists of Granada: Estrella Morente, Marina Heredia and Victor Blaya Quero or 'El Charico' (died 2008), although the term "intellectual singer" with which usually present him in festivals and competitions, is undoubtedly his best mark:

Juan Pinilla is not only a writer, a researcher, a translator, an actor or an exceptional singer who at the Festival de las Minas de La Unión has earned seven first prizes, rising in 2007 with the highest award mining lamp, making Granada became the only singer who has this distinction today, Juan Pinilla is, above all, an exceptional intellectual left, a reference for all who want to keep alive the commitment, activism and art.

Shangay Lily, Publico Journal, March 2012.

He has been fond of classic singing since childhood, and learn from sources like Manuel Vallejo, Girl of the Combs, Thomas Pabon, Chacón, Cayetano Muriel, Antonio Mairena and Manuel Ávila Cobitos. Indirect disciple of the latter is considered. At 18 he began his university studies in Granada and became a regular of flamenco and cultural events organized in the city, participating in conferences, workshops and discussions. He met teachers like Albaicin Curro, Curro Andres, Paco Moyano, José Carlos Zarate and Francisco Manuel Diaz of those who would learn later. He befriended Francisco Avila, a great fan of the Grenadian city of Montefrío, who introduced him in the forms of Manuel Ávila, Antonio Chacón, Tomás Pavón and Manuel Vallejo. He won his first prizes in competitions Íllora and Granada.

The writer Paula Marín introduced him to the Peña de La Platería, an organization of which he would later become a board member.

Furthermore, his work promoting flamenco in the media has stood out; he has served as a critic and chronicler for the newspapers, having been a critic and columnist for the 'La Opinión de Granada' journal, the Granada Hoy journal and the magazine El Olivo. He has been a lecturer and professor of flamenco in certain events and courses. Noted for his singing full of knowledge and shades, highlighted by critics as Estela Zatania, who told him about the performance that made the March 1, 2008 at the Festival de Jerez de la Frontera:

Few singers would be able to make such a journey, let alone one so young. And the audience responded with the biggest ovation I've seen in this hall of the Palace of Villavicencio since I came to the Festival de Jerez . Outside the clubhouse people lined up to take pictures of the singer conversing fluently in German, French and English

-Estela Zatania, in deflamenco.com

He has traveled countries like Japan, USA, Mexico, Brazil, France, Italy, Portugal, Luxembourg, England, Denmark, Sudan, Ethiopia, Egypt, Iran, Israel, Singapore, Poland, Austria, Germany, Czech Republic and Montenegro, among others. He designed several shows, most notably ' Damned ', which sets a poetic - musical among French damned poets and some Flemish artists parallelism. In October 2007 "La Platería", considered the dean of the Flamenco Associations in the world imposes him the Gold Badge of his organization, along with the dancers La Moneta and Patricia Guerrero. The Andalusian Youth Institute awarded him in March 2008, the prize 'Art and Creation' and in September of this year, the Hotel AC honored him with the award 'Image of Granada Flamenco'. La Peña Flamenca 'La Parra' decorated him with its logo and named him Golden Honorary Member. In late 2008, the flamenco club bearing his name was founded in his hometown of Huétor Tájar; its inauguration was attended by numerous figures from the worlds of politics and culture. He has given lectures and master classes in flamenco worldwide.

Very resounding was his visit to Baghdad (Iraq) where he did four performances and participated in panel discussions and debates in which he spoke about the civil war and its influence on culture and social ties between nations. Juan Pinilla has participated in numerous radio and television, emphasizing 'RNE mornings' with Juan Ramón Lucas, 'La Ventana', with Gemma Nierga, Juanjo Millás and Pau Dones and programs of Onda Cero, Cadena Ser Cope, Tele 5 or TVE. His interviews appear in media such as El Mundo, El País, Diario de Sevilla, ABC, La Verdad de Murcia, La Opinión de Granada, Journal GranadaHoy, Ideal and Cambio 16, among others.

== Las Voces que no Callaron ==
The "Las voces que no callaron" is the title of his first book and his second solo album on the market . Edited by Dreamcatcher cooperative Seville, Juan Pinilla takes an entertaining study of Flemish artists who struggled with his singing, dancing and guitar for the attainment of freedom and democracy. As explained in the work, with the same aims, banish the "scary topic" that ensures" Flamingos are the sun's heat." Thus, he analyzes the lives and adventures of such prominent names as Pericón Cadiz, La Niña de los Combs, Manuel Vallejo, Angelillo, Antonio Ruiz SolerAntonio 'The Dancer', Carmen Amaya, Sabicas, Pena Son, Juanito Valderrama, Paco Moyano, Manuel Gerena, Menese José Luis Marín or El Cabrero, among many others. On the disk that accompanies the book, Juan Pinilla is accompanied by the guitars of Paco Cortés, Rafael Rodriguez and Josele de la Rosa, and the voices and palms of Pepe and Villodres Fita Heredia. The work also contains the voices of the actors Emma Cohen and Paco Algora, reciting verses of Mark and Ana Gabriel Celaya, respectively, and is completed with lyrics bulerías Allan Poe and Gregorio Marañón, a 'Temporeras' of Montefrío, tanguillos, tangos, seguiriyas, fandango, mirabrás and cartagenera.

== Awards ==
- Trofeo 'ANGELILLO' Ateneo Cultural of Vallecas 2010.
- Prize 'POPULAR 2009'
- Prize ARTE Y CREACIÓN del Instituto Andaluz de la Juventud 2008
- Prize IMAGEN FLAMENCA de Granada 2008
- INSIGNIA DE ORO of the Peña Flamenca de La Platería (Granada) 2008
- SOCIO DE HONOR e INSIGNIA DE PLATA of the Peña Flamenca La Parra Huétor-Vega 2008
- PREMIO DIARIO IDEAL "LOS MEJORES DEL PONIENTE GRANADINO" Granada 2013
- 2007: Lámpara Minera del concurso del Festival Internacional del Cante de las Minas de la Unión (Murcia)
- 1 prize Concurso de Los Montes en Íllora (Granada)
- 1 prize por Granainas Ciudad de Granada
- 2nd prize in the National Concurso Nacional de Torrox
- 1 prize best young flamenco singer in Antequera (Málaga)
- 2nd prize Concurso Juan Casillas. Cuevas de San Marcos (Málaga)
- 3rd prize in the Concurso Nacional of Manlleu (Barcelona)
- 1 prize 'Resto de Cantes Mineros' in the Festival Internacional de las Minas de La Unión en 2003, 2005 y 2006.
- 2nd prize Cante por Mineras in the Festival Internacional de las Minas de la Unión en 2004
- 1 prize Cante por Cartagenas in the Festival Internacional de las Minas de la Unión en 2005

| Año | Categoría | Resultado |
|---|---|---|
| 2003 | Murcianas y Levanticas | PRIMER PREMIO |
| 2004 | Mineras | SEGUNDO PREMIO |
| 2005 | Cartageneras | PRIMER PREMIO |
| 2005 | Murcianas y Levanticas | PRIMER PREMIO |
| 2005 | Malagueñas | PRIMER PREMIO |
| 2006 | Murcianas y Levanticas | PRIMER PREMIO |
| 2007 | LÁMPARA MINERA | PRIMER PREMIO |

== Discography ==
- Lámpara Minera Volumen 3, RTVE-Música, 2008.
- The songs of the outcast, Robbin Tottom, Hard Cover, New York, 2002.
- Las voces que no callaron, Atrapasueños, 2011.
- La copla popular andaluza en Gerald Brenan, Carambolo, 2013.
- Jugar con Fuego, with the Spanish poet Fernando Valverde. Valparaíso 2014.

== Conferences ==
- The formation of the 'hearers', University of Granada, 2007
- John Habichuelas: A singer made guitar. 2008
- Flamingos in the Civil War, 2008.
- The voices that were not silenced, 2009.
- Manuel Ávila: 'cargaíllo' of songs and singers, 2009.
- Cobitos: The elegance of being singer, 2010
- Flamenco in Granada, 2010
- Dancers of Granada., 2010.
- The soleá of Pepe de Jun. 2010
- Granada 1922. Fiftieth Anniversary and Centennial, 2011.
- Flamenco dancing "Lecture-Performance by Manuel Linan, Bilbao 2012.
- Al Andalusian authors atheism, 2012.
- Behind the pinch. 2012
- All names of flamenco in Granada, 2013.
- Guitarists and luthiers Granada 2013.
- My interviews with flamingos, 2013.
- Political commitment in contemporary art. 2013
