= Pepe Habichuela =

Spanish flamenco guitarist (1944–2026)

José Antonio Carmona Carmona (23 October 1944 – 4 August 2026), known professionally as Pepe Habichuela, was a Spanish flamenco guitarist. He is cited as one of the great flamenco masters and one of Spain's finest contemporary guitarists. He was born in Granada and belongs to a flamenco dynasty of gypsies. The dynasty was started by his grandfather, known as "Habichuela el Viejo" (Old Bean), who took the nickname. It was further continued by his father José Carmona and his brothers Juan Habichuela (1933), Carlos, and Luis.

== Life and career ==
In 1964 he moved to Madrid where he performed in several flamenco shows. He shared the stage with artists such as Juanito Valderrama, Camarón de la Isla and Enrique Morente. Pepe Habichuela recorded an album in tribute to singer Antonio Chacón which won the National Prize of discography in 1975.

Pepe Habichuela was the father of José Miguel Carmona Niño and uncle of Juan José Carmona Amaya El Camborio and Antonio Carmona Amaya (sons of his brother Juan Habichuela). The three formed the New Flamenco band Ketama. In 2001, Habichuela released the album Yerbagüena as part of Pepe Habichuela & The Bollywood Strings, a unique mix of flamenco guitar and Indian string music. He has also experimented with Arabic-flamenco fusion music. He has been described as "highly emotional" like Tomatito, with one author saying "If flamenco has earned its rep as an overly emotional music, it isn't going to be Habichuela who turns it around."

Habichuela died on 4 August 2026, at the age of 81.

== Principal albums ==
- Enrique Morente & Pepe Habichuela – Homenaje a D. Antonio Chacón (A tribute to Don Antonio Chacón) (Hispavox, 1976, re-released by EMI, 2000)
- Enrique Morente – Despegando (CBS, 1977)
- A Mandeli (Nuevos Medios, 1983)
- Habichuela en rama (Nuevos Medios, 1997)
- Pepe Habichuela & The Bollywood Strings – Yerbagüena (Nuevos Medios, 2001)
- Nuevos Medios Colección (Nuevos Medios compilation, 2003)
- Dave Holland & Pepe Habichuela – Hands (Dare2, 2010)

== See also ==
- Paco de Lucia
- Paco Peña
- Vicente Amigo
