= Habichuela =

Juan Gandulla known as Habichuela (maternal surname according to sources: Padilla or Gómez and nicknamed "Habichuela") (born Cadiz 1860s or 1871, died Madrid 1925 or 1927) was a Spanish flamenco guitarist.

He began in Cadiz and soon switched between his hometown and Seville. He was a disciple of the master José González Patiño and replaced Javier Molina in the Salón Filarmónico and soon directed a flamenco group.

He soon began to be a guitarist accompanying singers such as Antonio Chacón, La Niña de los Peines, Juan Mojama, Escacena and Niño Medina. He recorded with Manuel Torre and La Serrana, as well as being a dance accompanist for Las Hijas del Ciego or Las Coquineras, La Macarrona, El Estampío, La Malena and Pastora Imperio.

Known as the Habichuela, he was the teacher of the founder of one of the most virtuous and respected flamenco lineages, Habichuela el Viejo (Habichuela the Elder), from whom renowned artists of the 20th and 21st centuries descend: Juan and Antonio Carmona, Pepe Habichuela.
