= Niño Josele =

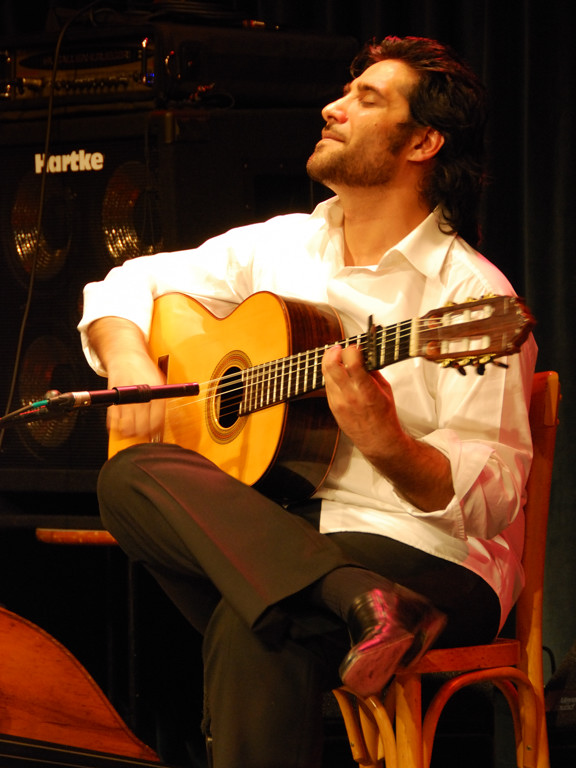
- Niño Josele in concert, 2008

Background information
- Birth name: Juan José Heredia
- Born: 24 April 1974 (age 51)
- Origin: Almería, Spain
- Genres: Flamenco
- Occupation(s): Musician, composer
- Instrument(s): Vocals, guitar
- Website: Official website

Niño Josele (born Juan José Heredia, 24 April 1974) is a Spanish guitarist, and exponent of the New flamenco style.

== Biography ==
Nino started playing at the age of six. He comes from a line of singers from Almería, a city on the Mediterranean Sea in southeast Spain, and is the son of Josele, a well-known singer from Almeria. Juan has performed with artists from all over the world, including international artists like Chick Corea, Joe Lavano, Andres Calamaro, and Lenny Kravitz, as well as flamenco musicians like Paco de Luca, Enrique Morente, Duquende, Remedios Amaya, or Diego el Cigala.

His first two albums show a vibrant, pure, modern flamenco style.

He then released a tribute to Bill Evans' music via his album Paz, showing his versatility as a musician. Having originated in a flamenco background, Josele adapts to complicated jazz music themes as well as creating his own mixture of various genres in his own compositions.

In addition to receiving his first award at the Flamenco Biennial of Sevilla in 1996, Juan received a 2010 Latin Grammy nomination for his solo CD "Espanola."

He has participated in the award-winning short film Almendros los Plaza Nueva and "La sombra de las cuerdas" 2009 (By Annabelle Ameline, Benoît Bodlet & Chechu G. Berlanga), a portrait of the guitar genius "El Niño Miguel".

== Discography ==
- Niño Josele (BMG, 2001)
- El Sorbo with Javier Limon (BMG, 2001)
- Paz (Calle 54, 2006)
- Española (DRO, 2009)
- La Venta del Alma (DRO, 2009)
- El Mar De Mi Ventana (DRO, 2012)
- Chano & Josele with Chano Dominguez (Calle 54, 2014)
- Galaxias (Beatclap, 2022)
