= Carmen Linares =

Spanish singer

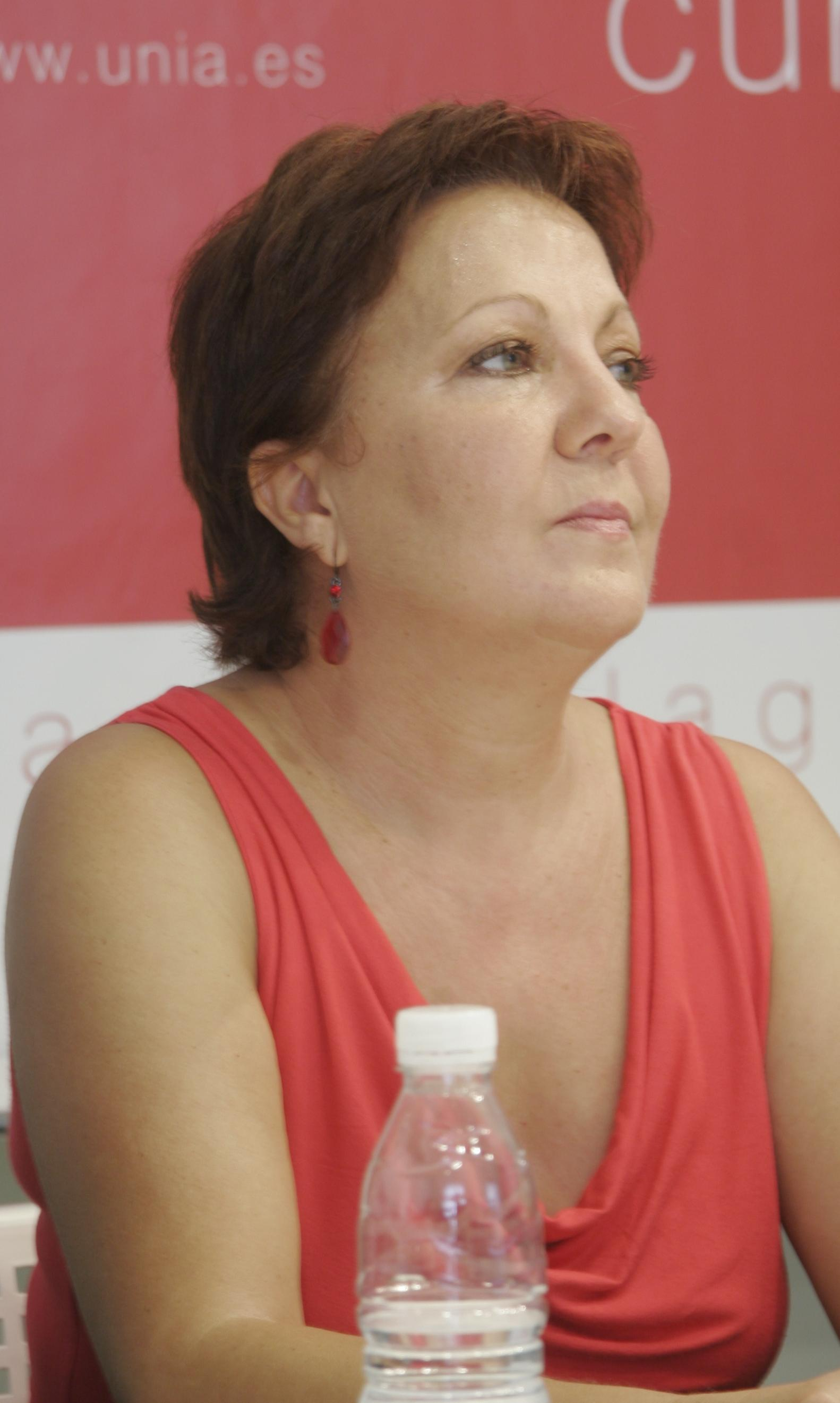
- Born: Carmen Pacheco Rodríguez; 1951 (age 74–75); Linares (Jaén), Spain

Carmen Pacheco Rodríguez (Born in 1951 in Linares, Jaén), better known by her stage name Carmen Linares, is a Spanish flamenco singer.

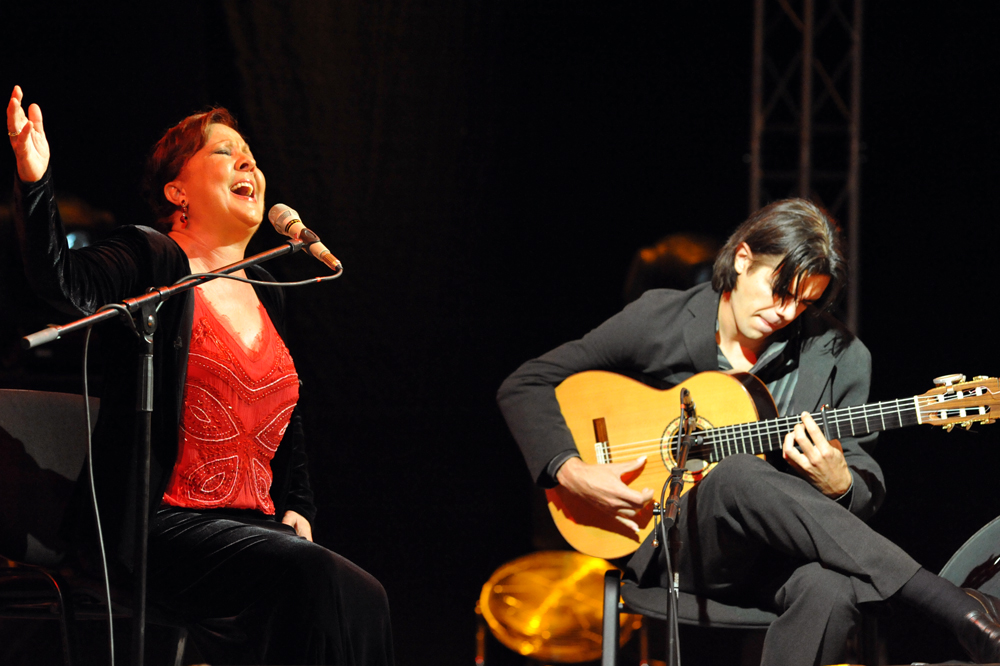
Performing in Warszawa during Cross Culture Festival in September 2011

She belongs a generation of flamenco artists along with Paco de Lucía, Camarón, Enrique Morente, Jose Mercé, Manolo Sanlúcar and Tomatito and she is considered a flamenco legend. Carmen Linares has carved out a place for herself in contemporary Spanish musical culture.

She was awarded Spain's Premio Nacional de Música for interpretation in 2001. In 2022 she received the Princess of Asturias Award in the category "Arts".

== Biography ==
Carmen Linares was born in Linares, Jaén. She moved to Madrid with her family in 1965. Her professional career began in the dance company of Carmen Mora, and she made her first recording in 1971.

She is also recognized as a maestra for young generation like Miguel Poveda, Estrella Morente, Pitingo, and Arcangel. She became a prominent figure in the genre of world music and critically acclaimed in flamenco music.

In the 70s and 80s she worked in Madrid alongside artists such as Enrique Morente, Camarón, Carmen Mora, and the brothers Juan and Pepe Habichuela.

In the 90’s Carmen Linares performed Manuel de Falla’s El Amor Brujo, under conductors such as Josep Pons, Leo Brower, Rafael Frübech de Burgos and Victor Pablo in venues including the Lincoln Center in New York, the Sydney Opera House, and the Royal Albert Hall in London.

She has recorded classic albums such as Cantaora, Canciones Populares de Lorca, Antología de la mujer el cante and Raíces y Alas. Her on-stage performances include collaborations with artists such as Manolo Sanlucar, Eva Yerbabuena, Victor Ullate, Uri Caine, Blanca Lí, Irene Papas, María Pagés and Lola Herrera.

Over the last twenty years she has appeared in shows all over the world, with her performances of "Oasis Abierto", "Ensayo Flamenco", "Remembranzas", "Encuentro", and "Cu4tro". In these shows, Carmen played alongside artists such as Belén Maya, Jorge Pardo, Juan Manuel Cañizares, Gerardo Núñez, Rafaela Carrasco, Tomasito, Juan Carlos Romero, Miguel Poveda, Marina Heredia, Carles Benavent, Javier Barón, Tino Di Geraldo, etc.

She has sung the verses of most recognized Spanish poets such as Juan Ramón Jiménez, Federico García Lorca and Miguel Hernández. In 2018 she released her album “Verso a Verso” and perform with the show “Tempo de Luz” in Carnegie Hall in New York, Adrienne Arsht Center in Miami, Wilshire Ebell Theatre in Los Angeles and Sadlers Wells in London.

The New York Times has described Carmen Linares’ voice as having expressive qualities.

In 2021/2022 she launched "Cantaora: 40 years of Flamenco".

This shows has an setlist with women styles, Federico García Lorca lyrics, a tribute to Paco de Lucía and Enrique Morente and guest artists in every shows as Estrella Morente, Luz Casal, Miguel Poveda, Arcángel, Joan Manuel Serrat, and Silvia Pérez Cruz.

She was the only flamenco woman artist who won the Premio Nacional de Música by Ministry of Culture of Spain in 2001. In 2022 she received the Princess of Asturias Award for the Arts and Latin Grammy Lifetime Achievement Award 2023.

== Recent Discography ==
Date	Title	Label	Cast
2024	40 años de Flamenco - Live Tour 2020 - 2024	Salobre	Carmen Linares (lead vocals), Salvador Gutiérrez, Eduardo Espín Pacheco (guitars), Pablo Suárez (piano), Josemi Garzón (double bass), Karo Sampela (percussion), Vanesa Aibar (dance), Ana María González (back vocals), Rosario Amador (back vocals). Featuring vocals: Silvia Perez Cruz, Miguel Poveda, Luz Casal, Joan Manuel Serrat, Estrella Morente, Arcángel, Martirio, Marina Heredia, Lucía Espín, Juan Valderrama, Miguel Ángel Cortés, Pepe Habichuela. Lyrics: Federico García Lorca, Miguel Hernández, Juan Ramón Jiménez, Enrique Morente, Mercedes Sosa, Antonio Machado, José Angel Valente.
2017	Verso a Verso	Salobre	Carmen Linares (lead vocals), Salvador Gutiérrez, Eduardo Espín Pacheco (guitars), Pablo Suárez (piano), Josemi Garzón (double bass), Karo Sampela (percussion) Silvia Perez Cruz (featuring vocals) Arcangel (featuring vocals)
2011	Remembranzas	Salobre	Carmen Linares (lead vocals), Paco and Miguel Angel Cortes, Juan Carlos Romero, Salvador Gutiérrez, Eduardo Espín Pacheco and Paco Cruzado (guitars), Pablo Suárez (piano), Javier Baron (dance), Miguel Poveda (vocals) Live Record from Teatro de la Maestranza (Seville)
2007	Raíces y Alas	Salobre	Carmen Linares (vocals), Juan Carlos Romero (guitar), Tino Di Geraldo and Cepillo (percussion),
2002	Un ramito de Locura	Universal	Carmen Linares (vocals), Gerardo Núñez (guitar), Pablo Martín (double-bass), Cepillo (percussion)
1996	Antología de la mujer en el cante	Universal	Carmen Linares (vocals), Tomatito, Vicente Amigo, Moraito, Rafael Riqueni, Enrique de Melchor, Pepe and Juan Habichuela, Jose Antonio Rodríguez, Manolo Franco, Paco and Miguel Angel Cortes, (guitars).
1994	Desde el Alma - Cante flamenco en vivo	Network	Carmen Linares (vocals), Paco Cortés & Miguel Angel Cortés (guitar), Jesús Heredia (percussion
1993	Canciones Populares Antiguas de Lorca	Naive	Carmen Linares (vocals), Paco and Miguel Angel Cortes, (guitars), Javier Colina (double bass), Juan Parrilla (violin), Bernardo Parrilla (flute), José Antonio Galicia (percussion)
1991	La luna en el río	Naive	Carmen Linares (vocals), Paco Cortés, Pedro Sierra (guitar), Carles Benavent (bass), Jesús Heredia (percussion), Javier Barón (dance)
1988	Cantaora	Warner	Carmen Linares (vocals), Paco Cortés, Pedro Sierra (guitar), Carles Javier Barón (clapping and dance)
1984	Su cante	Hispavox	Carmen Linares (vocals), Pepe and Luis Habichuela (guitar), Ketama (clapping and percussion)
1978	Flamenco: Carmen Linares	Hispavox	Carmen Linares (vocals), Luis Habichuela (guitar)
1971	Carmen Linares	Hispavox	Carmen Linares (vocals), Juan Habichuela (guitar)
