= Montse Cortés =

Montse Cortes
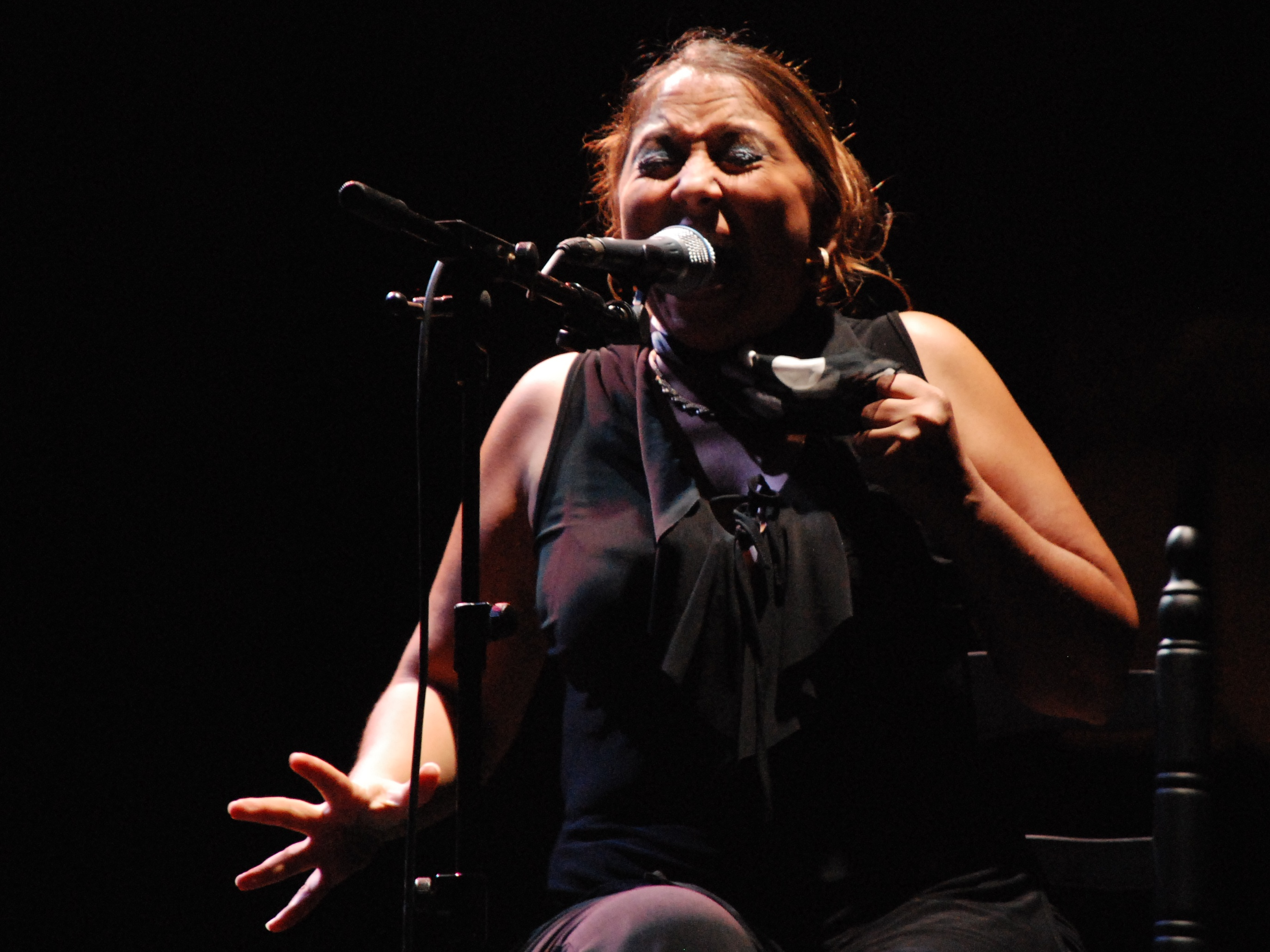
- Montse Cortes (Málaga, 2007)

Background information
- Born: Montserrat Cortés Fernández; 1972 (age 53–54); Barcelona, Spain
- Genre: flamenco
- Occupation: singer
- Instruments: voice; palmas

Montserrat Cortés Fernández (Barcelona, 1972) is a Spanish Roma flamenco singer, artistically known as Montse Cortés. Her discography includes, Alabanza (Sony, 2000), La rosa blanca (Sony BMG, 2004) and Flamencas en la sombra (Universal Music Group, 2014).

== Biography ==
Montse Cortés grew up in the La Mina neighborhood of Sant Adrià de Besòs. Her family had removed to Barcelona from Granada.

She started singing in the Barcelona tablaos accompanying the flamenco dance. This is how the choreographer Antonio Canales discovered Cortés and incorporated her into his company, where she remained for five years before deciding to record her first solo album, Alabanza (2000), for which she was nominated at the 2nd Annual Latin Grammy Awards. Among others, she has shared the stage with La Paquera de Jerez. She has sung for dancers such as Sara Baras, Juan de Juan, and Joaquín Cortés, and has accompanied the guitarist Paco de Lucía.

== Discography ==
- Alabanza (Sony, 2000)
- La rosa blanca (Sony BMG, 2004)
- Flamencas en la sombra (Universal, 2014)

== Collaborations ==
- Suena flamenco (1998) with Miguel Poveda
- De la zambra al duende (1999) with Habichuela
- Joaquín Cortés Live at the Royal Albert Hall (2003)
- Cositas buenas with Paco de Lucía (2004)
- Neruda en el corazón (2004)
- Casa Limón (2005)
- B.S.O. La leyenda del tiempo (2006)
- Tinta roja (2006) with Andrés Calamaro
- El tío Moncho. El arte del bolero (2007)
- Leyenda andaluza (2008) with Danza Fuego
- El Día Que Me Quieras with Andrés Calamaro
- Esencial Diego el Cigala (2016): Sol y Luna
