= Gerardo Núñez =

Spanish guitarist and composer (born 1961)

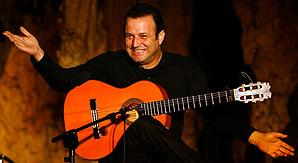
- Gerardo Núñez

Background information
- Born: Gerardo Núñez Díaz; 29 June 1961 (age 65); Jerez de la Frontera, Andalusia, Spain
- Genres: Flamenco, jazz
- Occupation: Musician
- Instrument: Guitar
- Years active: 1987–present
- Website: www.gerardonunez.com

Gerardo Núñez Díaz (born 29 June 1961) is a Spanish guitarist and composer. His roots are in flamenco but he has played fusion and jazz.

== Career ==
Núñez was born in Jerez de la Frontera (province of Cádiz) in 1961. His first teacher was Rafael [d]el Águila. At the age of fourteen he accompanied important cantaores and bailaores like Tío Gregorio el Borrico, Terremoto de Jerez, La Paquera de Jerez and Mario Maya, among others. He has recorded as a concert guitarist and accompanying the voices of Turronero, Pansequito, Indio Gitano. In his triple roles of composer, concert guitarist and accompanist, he has performed in diverse theater shows, the most notable being Mario Maya's ¡Ay Jondo! and Lorca's Yerma. He has also performed at numerous music festivals around the world. Afterwards, as a solo artist, Gerardo Nuñez has received excellent reviews, and he is considered one of the best prepared guitarists. He has also performed on several flamenco stages, gatherings and festivals, both at a national level and abroad: Paris, New York, Cologne, Havana, Munich. He has also been part of a guitar quartet, with which he has travelled all over the world, and has played alongside guitarists of international renown like Erico Raba, Alex de Grassi and Briam Gare. Additionally he has collaborated with bassist Eberhard Weber and accordionist Richard Galliano.

As a composer, his music is complex and rich, which allows him to demonstrate his playing ability. He has composed a large number of pieces for one of his best artistic partners (and his wife), flamenco dancer Carmen Cortés. He also made a version of El Amor Brujo, for four guitars, and he has attempted fusion with other kinds of music, especially jazz, but without ever leaving out flamenco as its foundation.

In August 2012 his album Travesia reached number 12 on the World Music Charts Europe.

== Discography ==
- 1987: El Gallo Azul (Flamencos Accidentales, GASA)
- 1989: Flamencos en Nueva York (Spain: GASA/Europe and US: Verabra Records)
- 1989: Flamencos en Nueva York (DRO East West, 1989), compilation
- 1997: Jucal (Alula Records) international version
- 1998: Salomé (Art-Danza), soundtrack from the Salomé dance show
- 1998: Calima (Alula)
- 2000: Jazzpaña II (ACT)
- 2001: Cruce de Caminos, with Perico Sambeat (Resistencia)
- 2002: Pasajes Passages, with Perico Sambeat (Resistencia)
- 2002: Un Ramito de Locura, with Carmen Linares (Mercury)
- 2004: La Nueva Escuela de la Guitarra Flamenca (ACT/Karonte)
- 2004: Andando el Tiempo (ACT)
- 2012: Travesia (ACT)
- 2015: Jazzpaña Live, with Ulf Wakenius (ACT)
- 2016: Logos, with Ulf Wakenius (ACT)
