= Enrique Morente =

Spanish singer (1942–2010)

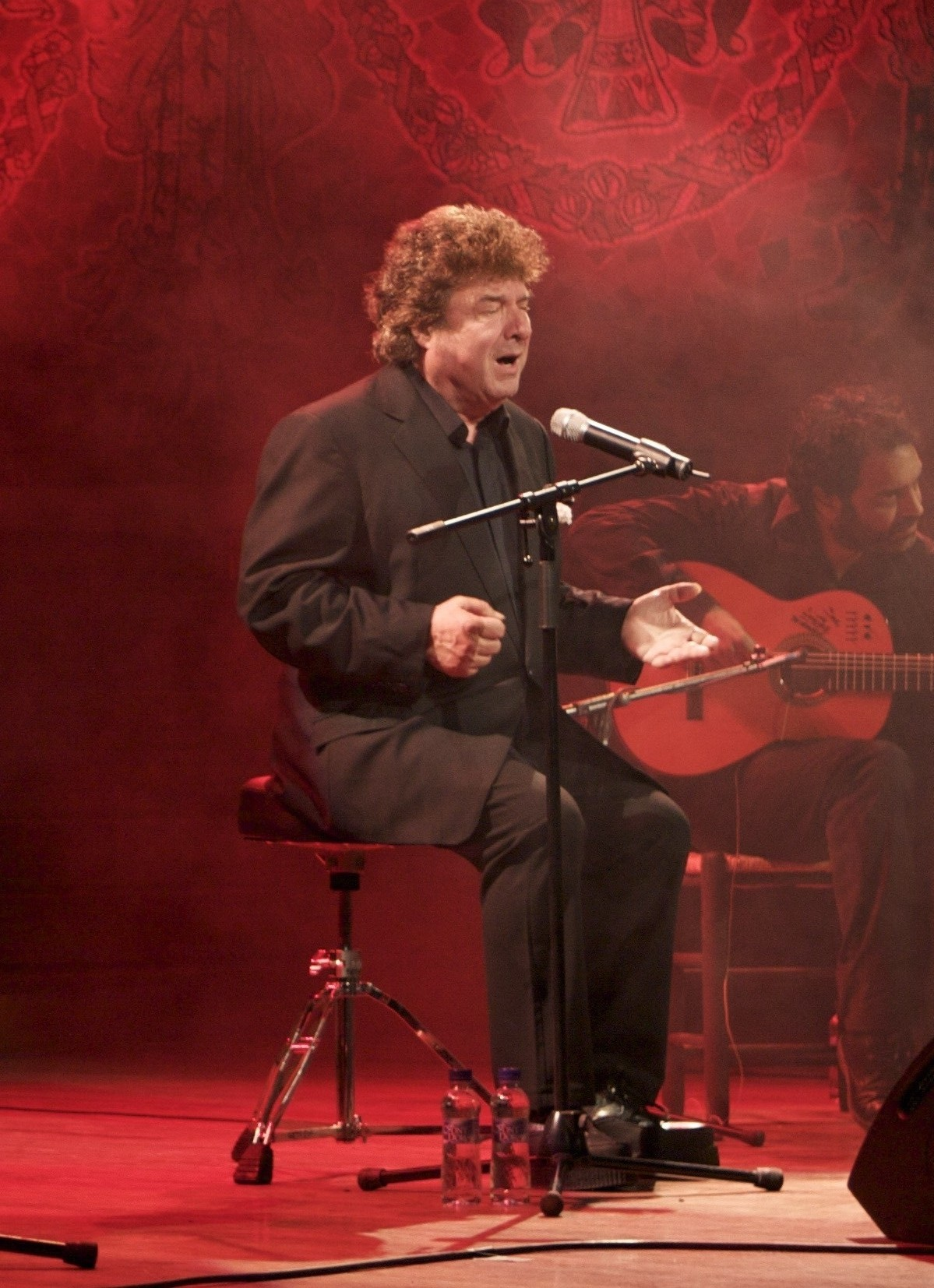

Background information
- Born: Enrique Morente Cotelo; 25 December 1942; Granada, Spain
- Died: 13 December 2010 (aged 67) Madrid, Spain
- Genre: New flamenco
- Occupations: Singer, songwriter
- Years active: 1960s–2010
- Website: enriquemorente.com

Enrique Morente Cotelo (25 December 1942 – 13 December 2010), known as Enrique Morente, was a Spanish flamenco singer and a celebrated figure within the world of contemporary flamenco. After his orthodox beginnings, he plunged into experimentalism, writing new melodies for cante (flamenco singing) and jamming with musicians of all styles, without renouncing his roots in traditional flamenco singing, which he kept on cultivating despite criticism.

"It hasn't been easy. First came the accusations of corruption of the music, of treachery in his struggle to disfigure what was already perfectly coded. When some albums and some categorical evidence of his knowledge of the classical approach laid these malicious comments bare, then came the most twisted condemnations. That the pace of the compás waned (just get a metronome and see for yourself), that he didn't really make you feel (are there really many true aficionados whose hair doesn't stand on end listening to his caña 'Eso no lo manda la ley', 'La aurora de Nueva York' or 'Generalife', to name three markedly different examples) and that kind of thing."

he was perhaps the most influential contemporary flamenco singer, who not only innovated, but it could also be said that he created tradition: some of his cantes have been performed by other singers such as Camarón de la Isla, Mayte Martín, Carmen Linares, Miguel Poveda, Segundo Falcón and Arcángel. He also is the father of flamenco singer Estrella Morente. The posthumously published volume of Leonard Cohen's poems, The Flame, includes "Homage to Morente." (pp. 30–31)

== Biography ==
Enrique Morente, born in the traditional quarter of Albaicín in Granada, started to sing as a seise (a member of a group of children who sing, dance and play castanets on certain religious festivals). He started to feel attracted to flamenco singing as a child, and had the opportunity to learn at family gatherings and to listen to established figures from Granada like Cobitos, the family of the "Habichuelas", or Aurelio Sellés (Aurelio de Cádiz):

"The cante begins inside you when you listen to the villager's singing, to people in their birthplace. Groups of people that meet in a tavern and start singing, and then you listen to them and start singing as well: you learn that at family parties where everybody sings and everybody drinks, and everybody dances and... Apart from that, it turns out that, of course, you need a technique, you need a school, you need to learn. In order to achieve this, what you need... the main help you can get is to have a liking for it; and then the skill to know who to learn from, and from what sources, where to find the good. Then you are on."

However, this appreciation for the popular side of flamenco does not mean that he considers flamenco as just "an art of the people". A flamenco artist, for him, needs technique and dedication:

"It is us, the professional artists of flamenco, who have to make cante flamenco, and nobody else, Flamenco, like any other art, is an art of professionals, although there are many people who peer at us, with a look as if to say: What interesting little creatures! or maybe: Oh! What music the people are playing! and so on. And people often think that maybe you have to have fingers swollen from picking potatoes to be able to play the guitar with feeling. Look, picking potatoes is every bit as worthy as playing a guitar. But I can tell you that a man -with fine, sensitive fingers is not going to be able to make a go of picking potatoes: and I can also tell you that a man with fingers swollen from picking potatoes is not going to be able to play a guitar because he hasn't got the manual dexterity and he hasn't got the dedication. This is a profession like any other which you have to dedicate yourself to completely. It is an art of professionals."

Still in his teens, Morente went to live in Madrid to start a professional career as a singer. There he was able to meet some old masters like Pepe de la Matrona and Bernardo el de los Lobitos, and learned as much as he could from them. Pepe de la Matrona took special interest in teaching the young singer: "This interest was raised not so much by Enrique Morente’s intonation, by his registers or by his melismatic as by his attitude towards things, his respect and his learning capacity." In Madrid, he started singing at peñas flamencas (clubs for flamenco fans). In 1964, he signed a contract with the Ballet de Marienma, with whom he then performed at the Spanish Pavilion at the New York Worlds Fair and at the Spanish Embassy in Washington DC. Later he took part in a flamenco festival at Teatro de los Alcázares de los Reyes Cristianos, sharing the bill with Juan Talega, Fernanda and Bernarda de Utrera, Gaspar de Utrera, Tomás Torre and Antonio Mairena. During that year and the following one, he also toured Europe and Japan with different flamenco dance companies, and was employed at several tablaos (flamenco venues) in Madrid, such as Las Cueva de Nemesio, Zambra and El Café de Chinitas.

=== First recordings ===
Morente made his first recording, Cante flamenco in 1967 with guitarist Félix de Utrera. The recording received a special mention award from the Cátedra de Flamencología, and was followed by Cantes antiguos del flamenco (1969), with guitarist Niño Ricardo. His first recordings were strictly orthodox and showed deep knowledge of traditional flamenco, a rare quality for singers of his generation. During this period he also made his first contact with guitarist Manolo Sanlúcar, with whom he would cooperate on several occasions. Sanlúcar accompanied him in his concert in Ateneo de Madrid, the first occasion in which a flamenco singer performed in that prestigious cultural institution.

His next record, Homenaje flamenco a Miguel Hernández (Flamenco Homage to Miguel Hernández, 1971), initiated his frequent use of lyrics by outstanding poets. Later on, he would record flamenco songs with lyrics by Federico García Lorca, John of the Cross, Lope de Vega, Al-Mutamid, Antonio Machado and Manuel Machado, Jorge Guillén, and others.

"The thing that most calls your attention in his first productions is how much care he devotes to the lyrics of his cantes. This is probably the first step in his future career as an innovator in flamenco. The poems by Miguel Hernández, for example, became immortal in his impressive 'Nana de la Cebolla' or 'El Niño Yuntero'. With the attitude he showed, in these poems, against the francoist regime, he became the favourite flamenco singer for the left-wing opposition in the country, as well as one of the first innovators."

In 1971 and 1972, he toured Mexico with guitarist Parrilla de Jerez and dancer Ana Parrilla, a tour which included his presentation at the Auditorium of the Universidad de las Américas, and performed at Lincoln Center (to which he would return to perform at again in 1973) and the Spanish Institute in New York City. In 1972, he was also awarded the Premio Nacional del Cante (National Award for Flamenco Singing) by the Cátedra de Flamencología in Jerez.

=== Alternating tradition ===
Morente arrived back to orthodox flamenco singing with his recording Homenaje a Don Antonio Chacón (Homage to Antonio Chacón, 1977), which obtained the National Award for best folk music album, granted by the Ministry of Culture. In this recording, Morente vindicated the figure of singer Antonio Chacón, the creator of the granaína and a fundamental figure of flamenco in the first decades of the 20th century, who had been, nevertheless, relegated by the views of the 1950s–1970s flamencology, as a representative of the non-Romani (Gypsy) flamenco which that generation considered impure. However, in an alternation between tradition and innovation typical of Morente, the recording was immediately followed, in 1978, by Despegando ("Taking off"), this time in an innovative mood: the title itself is, in fact, a declaration of intentions.

In 1981 he toured a new show, Andalucía hoy ("Andalusia Today"), which he would later perform at the Paris Olympia in Paris, France. In 1982, some of his recordings were chosen by flamencologist José Blas Vega to take part in the flamenco anthology Magna Antología del Cante (a complete collection of traditional styles of cante) to illustrate songs such as the tarantas from Almería, several types of cartageneras, the fandangos by Frasquito Yerbabuena, and all the malagueñas and granaínas created by Antonio Chacón.

In 1990 in another comeback to orthodoxy, he recorded Morente-Sabicas, with guitarist Sabicas, who was already in his 70s. In the following year, he created and recorded a flamenco mass, a type of creation that already had some precedents, like the one recorded by Antonio Mairena, Luis Caballero, and Naranjito de Triana in 1968. However Morente's mass is totally different from any previous examples. Whereas earlier flamenco masses basically tried to use traditional flamenco singing for the liturgy, Morente's does not even have a liturgic purpose, and mixes flamenco with other genres like Gregorian chant. About this mass, in one of his touches of humour, Morente said:

"At a given point, I thought I could dedicate it to Pope Clement, the one of El Palmar de Troya, but then I remembered that he had canonized Franco, Primo de Rivera, Carrero Blanco and all those guys and, while on the one hand I thought it was funnier, on the other hand I thought the joke could be interpreted in a strange way and I didn't do it, though I was about to do it. But the record was made with a sincerity and a true intention, no matter the results, and I thought it was like ruining it a bit because of the joke.. and that was too much!"

=== Later works ===
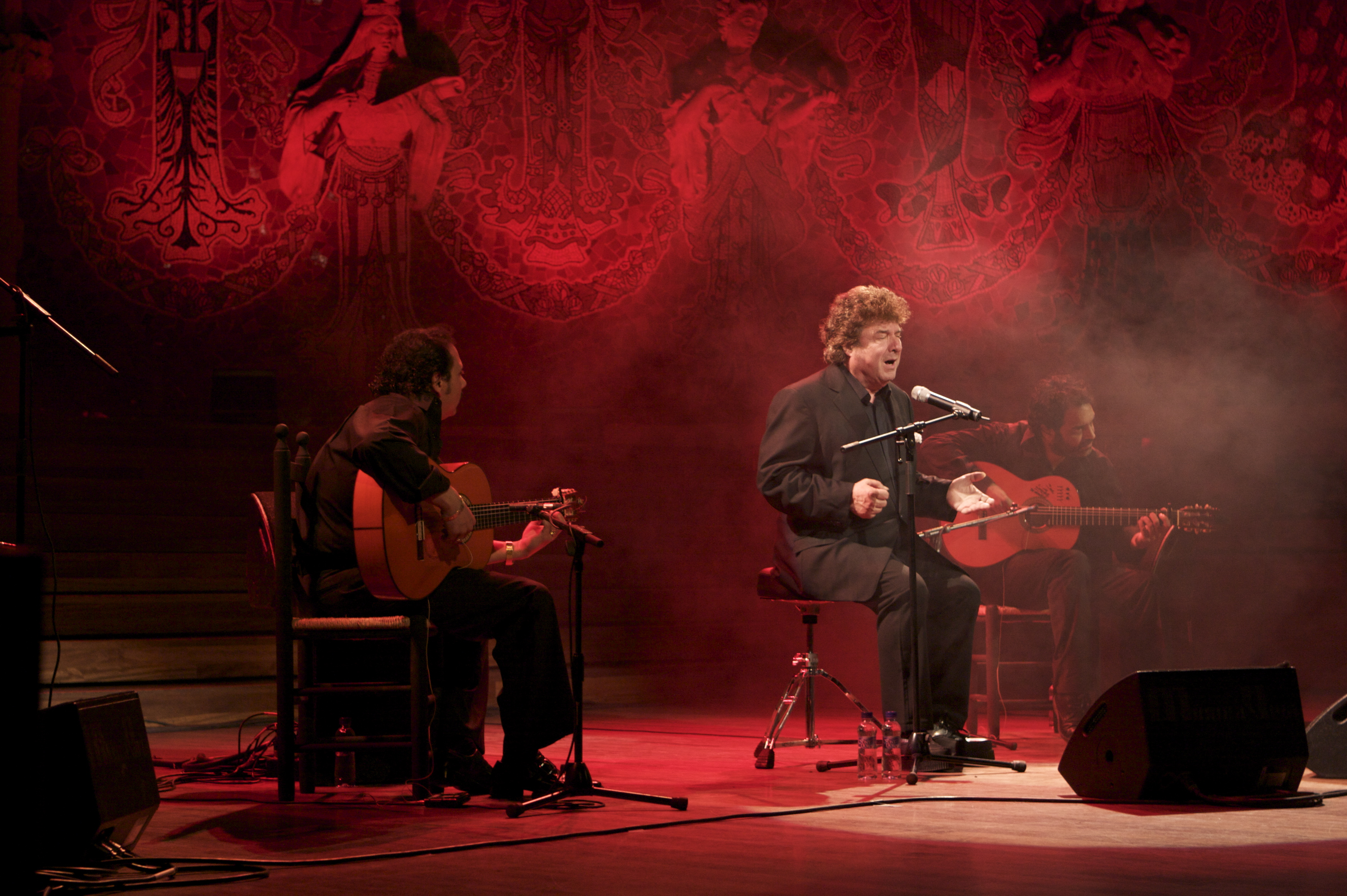
Enrique Morente in concert (Barcelona, March 2009).

In 1995 he appeared singing a siguiriya in Carlos Saura's film Flamenco and recorded his most controversial recording: Omega, together with the alternative rock group Lagartija Nick, with the participation of guitarists such as Tomatito, Vicente Amigo, Juan Manuel Cañizares and Miguel Ángel Cortés and percussionists like Tino di Geraldo. Flamenco and punk rock are mingled with recreations of songs by Leonard Cohen, and lyrics from Federico García Lorca's book Poeta en Nueva York ("A Poet in New York"), together with traditional flamenco lyrics. The work was performed at the 2008 Festival Internacional de Benicàssim, under the stage name "Morente Omega con Lagartija Nick" (Antonio Arias, David Fernandez, Lorena Enjuto and Jesus Requena).

The year 2001 saw the publishing of a very much sought for record by Morente, "Enrique Morente en la Casa Museo de García Lorca de Fuentevaqueros", a collection of songs based on the poetry of Federico García Lorca. The recording had been made in studio in Madrid, in 1990, and it had been commissioned by the Diputación de Granada (a government institution). Only a limited edition was made and the copies were sent as gifts to particular persons. In the second hand market, those copies reached 25,000 pesetas (150 euros).

Another interesting release of Morente, El Pequeño Reloj, saw the light in 2003. Whereas the second half of the CD is a more or less random collection of songs, the first half of the record comprises a surprising series of songs which are broken in two parts: in the first part of the song, Morente's voice is superimposed on top of old 78 r.p.m recordings of old masters of the flamenco guitar like Ramón Montoya, Sabicas or Manolo de Huelva, while the second part is a modern development of the same palo, with the side guitar of the young and innovative guitarist Niño Josele.

Although Morente could not read musical notation he composed music for theatre plays, films and television, such as the work Las Arrecogidas del Beaterio de Santa María Egipcíaca, the music for Oedipus the King with José Luis Gómez.

He has tried the mixture between flamenco and classical music in works like Fantasía de cante jondo para voz y orquesta (Cante jondo Fantasy for voice and orchestra, together with pianist Antonio Robledo, guitarists Juan Habichuela and Gerardo Núñez and the Madrid Symphony Orchestra, conducted by Luis Izquierdo, 1986) or with Allegro Soleá, which he presented at Seville's Flamenco Biennal in 1990. Along the lines of the mixture of flamenco with other types of music, he collaborated in the show Macama Jonda by José Heredia Maya, together with the Tetuan Andalusian Orchestra and Abdessadeq Cheqara, or with the Bulgarian Voices choir Angelite. In Morente's aforementioned recording Omega, he mixed flamenco singing with punk rock, music by Leonard Cohen, and lyrics by Federico García Lorca. In the show África-Cuba-Cai he mixed flamenco with music from Senegal, and Cuba (Cai is the way Cádiz is pronounced in Andalusian Spanish). The show also underlines the historic links between Cuban and flamenco music: "That's always been close to flamenco, since way back, because the ships in Cádiz went to Cuba, some came and others stayed over there, we've always had that." It is difficult to think of any kind of music which has not interested Morente. After one of his concerts with Cheqara Orkesta of Tetuan, he declared: "...if I had to put out a CD for every culture I mixed with I'd be putting out about 7 or 8 CDs a year. It wouldn't be bad – if I got paid for it by the record company then I could build myself a home."

Owing to his innovative approach, Morente was widely criticized by the more extreme traditionalist sectors of flamenco's critical faculty and public, though it had been said that "Needless to say, all this cost Morente a real torment, since flamenco is still a very closed world, in which the slightest attempt for novelty is taken as a deadly sin of heresy.". Although Morente's work is now widely recognized by most critics, and has inspired many singers of the young generation like Mayte Martín or Arcángel, there is still a section of traditionalist critics and public that still disparage his work:

"Aficionados were scratching their heads after the show, trying to figure out exactly, which forms—if any—Morente was working in much of the time. 'Remember the old days when you could actually recognize what flamenco forms were being performed?'"

Ethnic bias is often not alien to these criticisms. A good number of flamenco critics and public were introduced into flamenco at the time of the "reappraisal period" led by singers like Antonio Mairena and critics like González Climent or Ricardo Molina, in whose views, pure flamenco singing would be a patrimony of Romanis, which non-Romanis could only try to imitate in vain without ever reaching its essence. In the same review quoted above we can read: "And once you have experienced truly great Romani singing of this sort, the erudition of an artist like Morente pales like a candle flame next to a blazing torch." These views on Morente, though very common in the 1970s and 1980s, have almost died down. The controversy between tradition and innovation, Romani and non-Romani singing and other topics, so common twenty years ago, is now relatively confined to a limited section of the public, while most flamenco fans and critics acknowledge Morente's deep artistic intelligence and commitment:

"This comes from the man who never sings the same way twice, who tirelessly seeks that new inflection, that unheard-of scale, the change of tone that best matches the desired feeling and intentions at a given moment. The easy option would be the other one. To do what Enrique does you need extreme intellectual abilities and extreme emotional commitment. He takes the perfectly-laid, common foundations, defined by tradition, and on them builds with all the conceivable potential of flamenco."

In December 2010 it was reported that Morente had fallen into a coma after an ulcer operation, and had been declared brain dead. He died in Madrid on 13 December 2010.

== Awards ==
- 1967:First prize at the contest Málaga Cantaora
- 1972: Premio Nacional de Cante (Flamenco Singing National Award) granted by Cátedra de Flamencología y Estudios Folklóricos Andaluces de Jerez de la Frontera
- 1978: National Award for best folk recording, awarded by the Ministry of Culture
- 1989: Honorary Membership of the San Juan Evangelista Jazz and Music Club.
- 1994: National Music Award (Ministry of Culture); he was the first flamenco singer in history to receive this distinction.
- 1995: Golden Medal of the Cátedra de Flamencología de Jerez de la Frontera.
- 1995: Compás del Cante Award.
- 1998: Honorary Award of the Music Awards, granted by the Ministry of Culture.
- 2004: Pastora Pavón ("Niña de los Peines") Award, granted by the Regional Government of Andalusia.
- 2005: Medal of Andalusia, awarded by the Regional Government of Andalusia.
- 2006: National Critics' Award for Best DVD and Best Flamenco Singing Album for Morente sueña la Alhambra.
- 2006: National Music Award for Best Flamenco Recording for Morente sueña la Alhambra.
- 2006: Morato de Oro, awarded by Peña El Morato.
- 2006: Best Flamenco Recording, Deflamenco.com Awards.

== Filmography ==
- Flamenco. Directed by Carlos Saura (1995)
- Morente sueña La Alhambra. Directed by José Sánchez-Montes (2005)
- Iberia. Directed by Carlos Saura (2005)
- Morente. Directed by Emilio R. Barrachina (2011)

== Discography ==
- Cante flamenco (1967)
- Cantes antiguos del flamenco (1969)
- Homenaje flamenco a Miguel Hernández (1971)
- Se hace camino al andar (1975)
- Homenaje a Don Antonio Chacón (1977)
- Despegando (1977)
- Morente en vivo, Díscolo, (1981), illegal recording live
- Sacromonte (1982)
- Cruz y Luna (1983)
- Esencias flamencas (1988)
- Morente – Sabicas (1990)
- Enrique Morente en la Casa Museo de Federico García Lorca de Fuentevaqueros (1990)
- Misa flamenca (1991)
- Negra, si tú supieras (1992)
- Alegro, Soleá y Fantasía del Cante Jondo (1995)
- Omega (1996)
- Morente – Lorca (1998)
- El pequeño reloj (2003)
- Morente sueña la Alhambra (2005, Mute Records)
- Pablo de Málaga (2008)
