= Estrella Morente =

Spanish flamenco singer

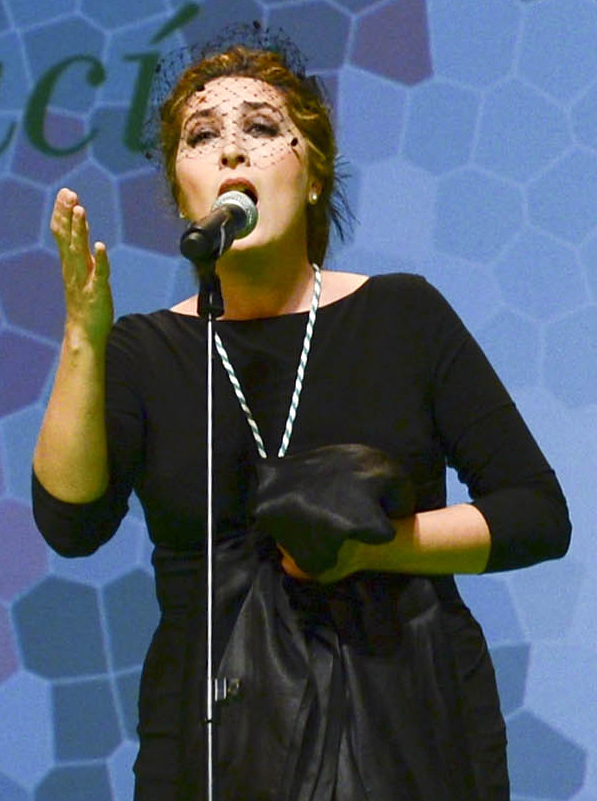
- Estrella Morente singing the anthem of Andalusia in 2014

Background information
- Born: Estrella de la Aurora Morente Carbonell; 14 August 1980 (age 45)
- Origin: Las Gabias, Granada, Spain
- Genres: Cante flamenco
- Years active: 2001–present
- Label: Mute
- Website: estrellamorente.es

Estrella Morente (Estrella de la Aurora Morente Carbonell) is a Spanish flamenco singer. She was born on 14 August 1980 in Las Gabias, Granada in southern Spain. She is the daughter of flamenco singer Enrique Morente and dancer Aurora Carbonell.

She has performed with her father since age seven and recorded her first album in 2001, Mi Cante Y Un Poema (My Songs and A Poem). This was followed the same year by Calle del Aire, which was well received by critics and flamenco fans. She released her third album, Mujeres (Women) in 2006, which her father produced. On 14 December 2001 she married bullfighter Javier Conde in Nuestra Señora de las Angustias basilica in Granada. They have two children, Curro (2002) and Estrella (2005).

== Musical career ==
Fanatical about flamenco singers such as La Niña de los Peines, Camarón de la Isla, Pepe Marchena and Manuel Vallejo, she sang folk songs at the age of 4. She sang a taranta (traditional sailor's song) accompanied by maestro Sabicas' guitar at age 7. Her art has dazzled not only the most demanding flamencologists but also rockers like Lenny Kravitz. Estrella's debut as a singer took place at the presentation gala of the Alpine Ski Championships in Sierra Nevada, being only 16 years old. Estrella participated in Omega, Enrique Morente's album. Carmen Linares sponsored her at the Teatro de la Maestranza in Seville in a tribute to La Argentinita, a Spanish-Argentinian dancer and singer. Her first album, "Mi cante y un poema" (My folk song and a poem) composed of flamenco songs was platinum and the second, "Calle del aire" (Air Street) composed of popular and Christmas songs, was gold. Thanks to the success of her albums, the singer has participated in numerous festivals, such as the Seville Biennial, the Barcelona Guitar Festival and the Granada International Music and Dance Festival in Granada.

In the summer of 2004 she presented, in Granada, the concert "Estrella 1922" a tribute to the Sevillian singer Pastora Pavón, la Niña de los Peines, recorded live for its later edition. In 2005 she made her debut at the Barbican Center in London and started a series of shared concerts with her father Enrique, commissioned by the International Festival of the Guitar of Córdoba. In addition, the show "Estrella 1922" premiered also at the Teatro Español in Madrid that same year.

== Discography ==
- Mi cante y un poema (2001)
- Calle del Aire (2001)
- Mujeres (2006), Mute Records
- Casacueva y escenario (2007) (DVD)
- Autorretrato (2012)
- Amar En Paz (con la guitarra de Niño Josele) (2014)
- Falla & Lorca: Encuentro with Javier Perianes (2016)
- 15 Años con Estrella (2016) (Compilation)
- Copla (2019)
- Leo (2021)
- Estrella & Rafael (with Rafael Riqueni) (2023)

== Filmography ==
Morente was the voice behind Penélope Cruz's flamenco song in the 2006 film Volver.

She played herself in the 2011 animated feature Chico & Rita.

In 2013, Estrella narrated the documentary, Guadalquivir, directed by Joaquín Gutiérrez Acha. The film is about the Guadalquivir River, the wildlife, and the natural reserves/parks from Cazorla to Doñana, through the Sierra Morena mountains in Andalusia, southern Spain. The director commented that "We needed to find the voice of Andalucia. And it is Estrella, without a doubt. It is a plus for this work/project. Guadalquivir would have not been the same film without her."

On 15 February 2014 the short film "Caen Piedras desde el Cielo" (Stones fall from the skies), by director Rafael Robles "Rafatal", premiered in Malaga, Spain, starring Estrella Morente as the protagonist, "Luz". The short film is about a single mother in the 1970s working in a religious hospital and the obstacles she faced.

== Awards and recognitions ==
There are many awards and recognitions that she has received in her professional career. In 2001 she was named Ambassador of Andalusia by the Andalusian Institute of Youth. She has won countless awards, including the Ondas Award for Best Flamenco Creation, the Latin Grammy nomination and two Amigo Awards. Her first album was a platinum record and the second one was gold. In 2006 she was nominated for Latin Grammy and won the 2006 Music Award for Best Flamenco Album. She also received the prestigious Golden Microphone Award, granted by the Federation of Radio and Television Associations of Spain. At the beginning of 2008 received the Best Live Show Award, after an international survey conducted by the digital newspaper deflamenco.com, in addition to the "Flamenco Hoy" Award in its ninth edition, for the best flamenco DVD, "Casacueva y Escenario". In 2014 she was awarded the Medalla de Andalucía and was named director of the first Chair of Flamencology of the World taught by the San Antonio Catholic University of Murcia (UCAM) and the Cante de las Minas Foundation.

== Controversy on Operación Triunfo ==
In February 2020, Estrella Morente sparked controversy during Gala 6 of Operación Triunfo 2020 by altering the introduction of "Volver" while performing with Nia Correia to include verses in favor of bullfighting. This modification was unplanned and surprised both the production team and the contestant.

Noemí Galera, the director of the Academy, deemed the act inappropriate, stating that Morente used prime-time television to make a personal statement. Morente defended her action as spontaneous, although some media outlets suggested that the verses came from a previously written bullfighting poem, raising doubts about whether it was truly improvisation.

The incident led to more than 1,500 complaints directed at RTVE and reignited the debate over bullfighting in Spain. The episode also reopened discussions on the responsibility of artists in using their media visibility. While some defended it as an act of free speech, others criticized her for using an entertainment program to promote a controversial practice.
