= Flávio Rodrigues =

Brazilian flamenco guitarist and composer (born 1979)

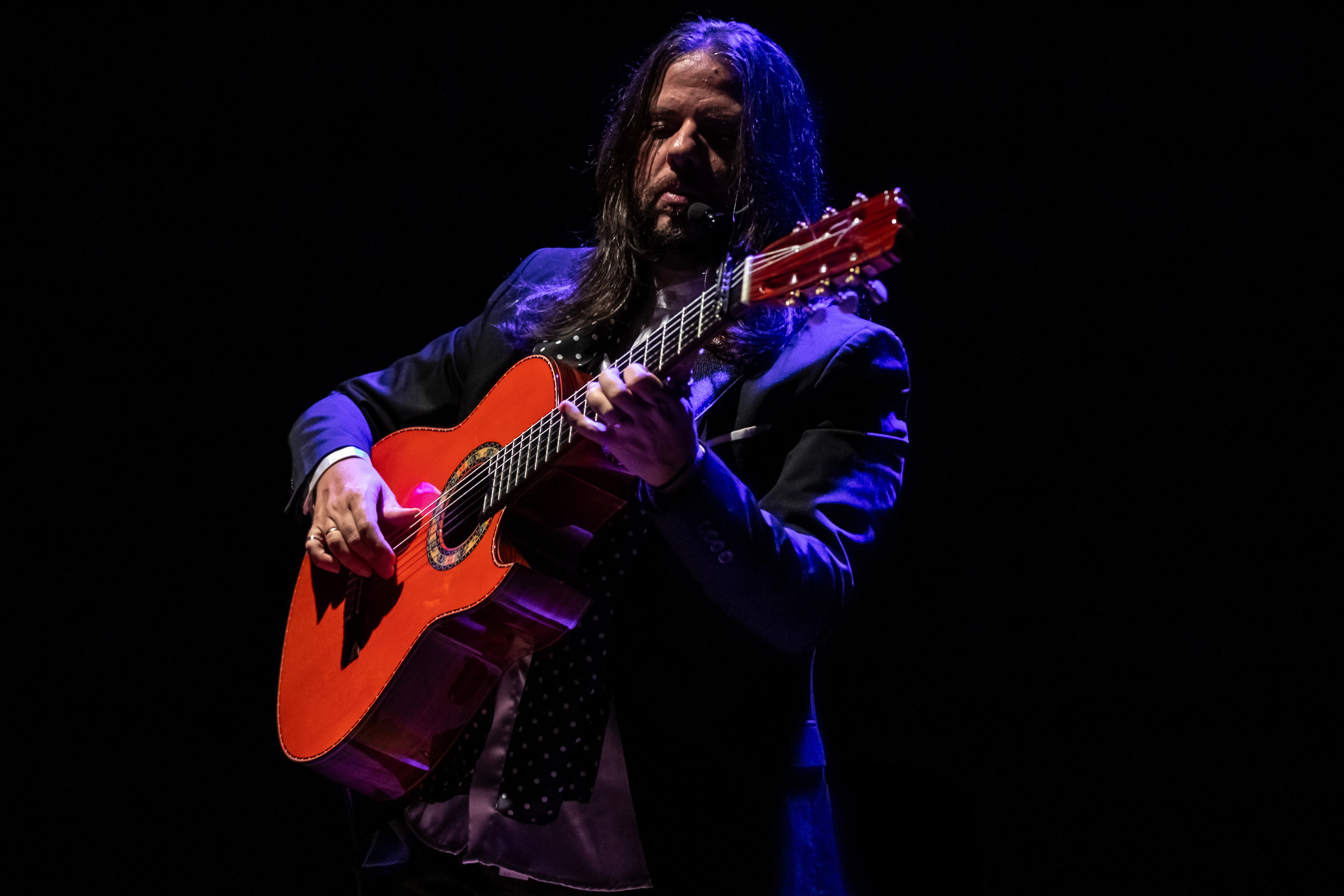
- Flávio Rodrigues in concert, San Jose, Costa Rica, 2024

Background information
- Born: Flávio Augusto Rodrigues Marques; April 12, 1979 (age 47); São Paulo, Brazil
- Origin: Madrid, Spain
- Genres: Flamenco, MPB, Jazz
- Occupations: Musician, composer, musical director, arranger, guitarist
- Instrument: Guitar
- Years active: 1992–present
- Website: www.flaviorodrigues-flamenco.eu

Flávio Augusto Rodrigues Marques (born April 12, 1979, in São Paulo, Brazil) is a Brazilian flamenco guitarist, composer, musical director and arranger, based in Madrid, Spain. Over a 25-year international career, he has performed in more than 50 countries across all five continents alongside some of the most acclaimed names in flamenco and world music.

== Life and career ==
=== Early life and musical training ===
Rodrigues was born on April 12, 1979, in São Paulo, Brazil, into a family of musicians. He began playing the guitar alongside his father at the age of five.

In 1992, he enrolled at "Groove" (Escola Livre de Música), where he studied Brazilian Popular Music (MPB) and Jazz under Leyve Miranda for three years.

In August 1994, he began studying flamenco guitar at the Centro Flamenco Pepe de Córdoba in São Paulo, under Fernando de la Rua.

In 1998, he moved to Spain for the first time, where he studied with three of the foremost flamenco guitar masters: Manolo Sanlúcar, Gerardo Núñez, and Rafael Riqueni.

=== Career in Madrid (2000–2018) ===
Since settling permanently in Madrid in 2000, Rodrigues established himself as a respected figure in the international flamenco scene. He worked with leading flamenco artists including Antonio Canales, Manuel Reyes, Domingo Ortega, Belén Fernández, Rafaela Carrasco, Belén Maya, Concha Jareño, Adela Campallo, Pastora Galván, Rocío Molina, Rubén Olmo, Manuel Liñán, Marco Flores, Maria Juncal, Belén Lopez, Alfonso Losa, José Maya (Joselillo Romero), Rafael Estevez, Pitingo, Rafael Jiménez "Falo", Talegón de Córdoba, Agustín Carbonell "Bola", Lole Montoya (Lole y Manuel), Montse Cortés, Pepe Habichuela, José Jiménez "el Viejín", José Luís Montón, Juan Parrilla, Rubém Dantas, Juan Gomez "Chicuelo", Jorge Pardo, and José Soto "Sorderita".

He has also collaborated with important Brazilian artists including Filó Machado, Nana Vasconcelos, Carlinhos Antunes, Yamandu Costa, Sizão Machado, Renato Martins, Thiago Espírito Santo, and Alex Buck. His work has also extended beyond flamenco, with international collaborations with Yoshida Brothers (Japan), The Savage Rose (Denmark), Trilok Gurtu (India), and Hossam Ramzy (Egypt).

He has been invited to perform before the King and Queen of Spain at major state events, as well as at private celebrations for cultural figures such as Pedro Almodóvar and Pina Bausch.

==== Rafael Amargo's Company ====
Rodrigues served as guitarist, composer, and musical director for Rafael Amargo's Company for five years, contributing to six different productions: Amargo, Poeta en Nueva York, Íntimo, Enramblao, D. Q. – Pasajero en Tránsito…, and Tiempo Muerto.

==== Zorro, the Musical ====
In 2008, Rodrigues served as Flamenco Guitar Supervisor for Zorro, the Musical, produced by Isabel Allende and directed by Chris Renshaw, with original music by the Gipsy Kings and John Cameron. The show premiered in London's West End at the Garrick Theatre on 30 June 2008.

==== Film and media work ====
In 2014, Rodrigues composed and recorded the original soundtrack for the short film Guernica, which was used in the 2015 exhibition Picasso e a Modernidade Espanhola at the Centro Cultural Banco do Brasil (CCBB). The film won the award for Best Short Film at the Festival of Audiovisual International Multimedia Patrimony.

His compositions were also selected as part of the soundtrack used by the Spanish Women's Artistic Gymnastics team, which won the silver medal at the 2016 Summer Olympics in Rio de Janeiro.

In 2015, he became a columnist for Revista Violão Mais, writing about flamenco guitar.

In 2019, he participated in the recording of the soundtrack for a biographical film about Brazilian singer Sidney Magal.

==== Flamenconautas (2018) ====
In 2018, Rodrigues was invited by choreographer Javier Latorre to serve as musical director, composer, and lead guitarist of the Cia. Internacional Flamenconautas for the production Vamo' Allá. The show, featuring a cast of 25 artists from 14 countries, premiered at the Teatro Villamarta during the Festival de Jerez in Spain.

=== Return to Brazil and international expansion ===
After nearly two decades based in Madrid, Rodrigues began making regular returns to Brazil, touring the country with his show Flamenco A3 — a minimalist production featuring the three core elements of flamenco: guitar (Rodrigues), cante (Loreto de Diego), and baile (David Romero). The show had previously triumphed at the Edinburgh Festival Fringe, the world's largest performing arts festival.

The 2013 Brazil tour opened on October 4 at the Teatro 4 de Setembro in Teresina, followed by a sold-out performance at the Teatro Augusta in São Paulo on October 8. Subsequent dates included the Teatro Atheneu in Aracaju (October 21), Tobias Barreto within the Festival das Artes Tobiarte (October 23), and the Teatro Arthur de Azevedo in São Luís do Maranhão (October 25).

In 2017, he was invited by the Festival Internacional de Flamenco de Montevidéu (Uruguay) to give a recital at the Palácio Legislativo, representing both Brazil and Spain. On the occasion he received a formal distinction from the President of the Uruguayan Parliament.

Rodrigues also offers educational programmes in Brazil, including his Violão Flamenco Sem Mistérios online course, and has contributed to the growth of flamenco teaching in the country.

== Discography ==
=== Studio albums ===
==== Anyway (2009) ====
Anyway is Rodrigues's debut solo album, released in 2009 (℗ 2009 Flavio Rodrigues). Described as "young, fresh, and contemporary flamenco" (flamenco joven, fresco y contemporáneo), its 11 tracks express traditional flamenco palos through a distinctly Brazilian sensibility, including a flamenco arrangement of João Gilberto's classic "Garota de Ipanema" and the closing title track, dedicated to his wife Luciana. The album premiered at the 30th Anniversary Festival Internacional de la Guitarra de Córdoba, alongside Mark Knopfler, Paco de Lucía, Deep Purple, David Russell, Pepe Romero, Duo Assad, Manuel Barrueco, and Leo Brouwer.

Anyway
No.	Title	Style (palo) / Featured artists	Length
1.	"Tríptico: Feira de Domingo, Batuquerías y Prelúdio"	feat. Hossam Ramzy, Sergio Martinez, David Moreira	1:33
2.	"Garota de Ipanema"	feat. Hossam Ramzy, Sergio Martinez, David Moreira, Juan Parrilla, Nantha Kumar, Giuliano Pereira, Marcelo Fuentes	3:36
3.	"Abandolao"	Rondeña y Zangano de Puente Genil – feat. Pedro Obregón, Roberto Lorente, Juan Parrilla, Sergio Martinez, David Moreira	4:51
4.	"Destempalo"	Tangos – feat. Carles Benavent, Sergio Martinez, David Moreira	5:15
5.	"Bom Retiro"	Guajira – feat. David Moreira & Giuliano Pereira	5:08
6.	"Candela"	Rumba (a Miguel "Candela") – feat. Jorge Pardo, Eliel Lazo, Jorge Cerrato "Jato"	4:39
7.	"Lo Bueno y Lo Malo"	feat. Juan Parrilla, Jorge Cerrato "Jato", David Moreira, Raffel Plana, Sergio Martinez	4:08
8.	"S.P. de La Frontera"	Bulerías – feat. Pedro Obregón & Roberto Lorente	3:37
9.	"Poquito a Poco"	Colombiana – feat. Carmina Cortés, Pedro Obregón, Jorge Cerrato "Jato"	5:25
10.	"Anyway"	(A Mi Esposa Luciana) – solo guitar	2:35
11.	"Toná"	Solo guitar	2:01
Total length:			42:52

==== Quintaesencia – Un Homenaje al Flamenco (2019) ====
Quintaesencia is Rodrigues's second solo album, released on November 22, 2019 (℗ 2019 Flavio Rodrigues). It represents a synthesis of 25 years of his international flamenco career and features some of the most prominent voices in contemporary flamenco from across Spain's different regional traditions. Speaking about the album's concept, Rodrigues explained: "The quintessence of flamenco is cante. I cannot comprehend flamenco without cante."

Quintaesencia – Un Homenaje al Flamenco
No.	Title	Style (palo) / Featured artists	Length
1.	"Viva los Jerelez (Bulerías de Jerez)"	feat. Alex Fernández, David Lagos, Diego del Morao, Javier Peña Jesús Méndez & Miguel Soto Londro	4:57
2.	"Tangos de Ravi (Tangos Extremeños)"	feat. Eva Durán, Guadiana, Antonio Serrano, Manuel Reyes, Antón Suárez, Pedro Obregón, Roberto Lorente & Antonio Ramos "Maca"	4:24
3.	"Reflexión (Taranta a Mi Madre)"		4:53
4.	"Trío de Ases"	feat. Blanca López, Pedro Obregón & Roberto Lorente	4:14
5.	"Alivio (Seguiriyas Dobles)"	feat. Duquende, Concha Jareño, Antonio Maya "Salvaje", David Moreira & Antón Suárez	4:08
6.	"Señor "Marqués" (Farruca, Zapateado & Vidalita a Mi Padre)"	feat. Diego Amador, Concha Jareño, Pedro Obregón, David Moreira, Blanca López & Roberto Lorente	7:25
7.	"La Caña de España"	La Caña – feat. María la Coneja, Jorge Pardo, Tony Maya, Mayte Maya, Pedro Obregón, Roberto Lorente & Carmina Cortés	3:36
8.	"Corazón Sincero (Fandangos Naturales)"	feat. María Carmona	2:20
9.	"Quintaesencia (Soleá)"	(solo guitar)	5:29
Total length:			41:00

==== Continuum (2024) ====
Continuum is Rodrigues's third studio album, released in 2024 (℗ 2024 Flavio Augusto Rodrigues Marques). The album is a collaboration with Fernando De La Rua — the same teacher who introduced Rodrigues to flamenco guitar in São Paulo in 1994 — making it a meaningful reunion between student and mentor thirty years later. The 9-track album runs 35 minutes and 20 seconds.

Continuum
No.	Title	Style (palo) / Notes	Length
1.	"Tangos de la Sierra"	Tangos – feat. Fernando De La Rua	4:10
2.	"Callejón de las Flores"	Taranto (Dedicado a Yara Castro) – feat. Fernando De La Rua	2:55
3.	"Intro & Trilla"	feat. Fernando De La Rua	1:38
4.	"La Sal"	Cantiñas – feat. Fernando De La Rua & Mari Lamarca	4:46
5.	"Las Carboneras"	Silencio – feat. Fernando De La Rua	1:49
6.	"Olillas de la Mar"	Seguiriyas (Dedicado a Pepe de Córdoba) – feat. Fernando De La Rua	5:31
7.	"Secretos de la Vida"	Bulerías – feat. Fernando De La Rua	3:08
8.	"Soleá de los 2"	Soleares – feat. Fernando De La Rua	6:08
9.	"Callejón de las Flores (Long Version)"	Taranto – Alternative Bonus Track – feat. Fernando De La Rua	5:11
Total length:			35:20

=== Singles ===
Title	Year
"Trío de Ases" (feat. Pedro Obregón, Roberto Lorente & Blanca Lopez)	2020
"Callejón de las Flores"	2023
"Tangos de la Sierra"	2024
"Portas Líricas"	2024
"Noche de Paz / Noite Feliz / Silent Night (Flamenco Guitar)"	2024

== Awards and recognition ==
- Winner of 3 Awards at the Festival de Música de Madrid (FestiMad – Spain, 2011):
  - "Best Flamenco Artist Award" (1st place – Flamenco/Raíces category)
  - "Newcomer Artist Award" (1st place – Revelación category)
  - "Guitar Hero's Audience Award" – "Best Live Performance" (Special award voted by the public)
- Winner of the "100 Latinos Award" (Fundación Fusionarte, Spain, 2012), alongside figures such as Mario Vargas Llosa, Alfredo Di Stéfano, Alaska, and Carlos Baute. The award recognises the careers of 100 Latin immigrants who have contributed to the development of Spanish society.
- Best Short Film – Festival of Audiovisual International Multimedia Patrimony, for the short film Guernica (2015).
- Formal distinction from the President of the Uruguayan Parliament, at the Festival Internacional de Flamenco de Montevidéu (2017).
