= Chicuelo (guitarist) =

Juan Gómez
- Birth name: Juan Ignacio Gómez Gorjón
- Also known as: Chicuelo
- Born: 1968 (age 56–57); Cornellà de Llobregat, Spain
- Genres: Catalan flamenco
- Occupation(s): Guitarist, composer, director
- Instrument: Guitar
- Website: www.chicuelo.com

Juan Ignacio Gómez Gorjón, better known as Juan Gómez "Chicuelo", (born 1968) is a Spanish flamenco guitarist from Barcelona, composer and director. Although he worked with a wide range of artists, Chicuelo is usually accompanied by the singer Miguel Poveda and singer Duquende, with whom he has toured extensively in Europe, Japan and the US and made many recordings with. He has also been musical director of Compagnie de Danse Japonaise Shohi Kojima ("Japanese Dance Company Shohi Kojima") since 1992, and musical director of the Somorrostro Dansa Flamenca with choreographer Javier Latorre since 2003.

== Early years ==
Chicuelo was born in Cornellà de Llobregat near Barcelona, Spain. He grew up in a gypsy family, with brothers who sang and played guitar; his brother Manel (Manuel Gómez), is a percussionist. Chicuelo was a student of Manolo Sanlúcar, and his brother, Isidro.

== Career ==
In his early career, he worked at the Tablao de Carmen with Mario Escudero, Angelita Vargas, Miguel de la Tolea, Eva Yerbabuena, Sara Baras, Adrián Galia, Belén Maya, Antonio ‘El Pipa’ and Joaquín Grilo. He has accompanied singers such as Enrique Morente, Rancapino, Chano Lobato, José Mercé, Duquende, Mayte Martín, Diego El Cigala, Carmen Linares and Potito; has shared the stage with musicians such as Chano Domínguez, Carles Benavent, Jorge Pardo, and Jordi Bonell; and has collaborated with the pianist Maria João Pires. Chicuelo participated in recordings with Tomatito, Mayte Martín, Ginesa Ortega, Joan Manuel Serrat, La Vargas Blues Band, Antonio Carmona, and Jordi Tonel; and often accompanies Poveda, with whom he has toured extensively in Europe, Japan and the US. In 1996, Chicuelo recorded Cambalache with Guitarras Mestizas with whom he recorded two albums. In the same year, he was one of several artists who participated in the Encuentro Productions' release of method books and DVDs which defined the individual artist's approach to composition. He also added guitar pieces to the unfinished film of Orson Welles, Don Quixote.

Since 1993 he has been the music director of Shōji Kojima and since 2003 he has also been the director of the Somorrostro Dansa Flamenca, produced by Taller de Músics. He was the musical director of Tarantos, and the composer of Inconnexus XXI, performed by Compañia Somorrostro, including the dancer Frederic Gómez. After producing his first solo CD, Cómplices, under the Harmonia Mundi label, he toured across the country; it was awarded "Best solo guitar album" by Flamenco Hoy magazine. In 2001, the same magazine awarded Chicuelo for "Best rhythm guitar" on the Poveda recording of Zaguán. In 2003, Chicuelo participated in the Qawwali production of Jondo with Duquende, Poveda and Faiz Ali Faiz; the CD and DVD edition came out in 2006. Chicuelo worked with Duquende on My Way of Living in 2005. He participated in the production Un momento y la Eternidad with Galván, and with Poveda as a performer and composer in the 2005 Desglaç including the subsequent tours between 2005 and 2007. Live in Paris Cirque d'Hiver, a Duquende CD released in 2007, was recorded in 2005, and pays homage to legendary flamenco singer Camarón de la Isla. In 2007, he worked on "Els treballs i els dies" with Poveda and Maria del Mar Bonet. In November 2007, they released their second album, Diapasión on the K Industria Cultural label, which featured flamenco pieces by musicians in the Catalonia jazz scene, such as Carles Benavent, Raynald Colom, Roger Blavia, and Elizabeth Gex. He was also actively involved in the writing and recording of the album Cante y Orquesta with Poveda and Joan Albert Amargós at the Festival de Peralada in August 2007; it was released in February 2009, based on a project which had been in development since 2000. In 2009, Chicuelo worked on arranging and recording the double album, Coplas del querer with Poveda, as well as touring with Duquende, Rafaela Carrasco and Silvia Perez Cruz.

== Festivals ==
In 1992, Chicuelo participated in the Seville Expo and the Bienal de Flamenco de Sevilla, at the Lope de Vega Theatre. He participated in the Festival de Jóvenes Flamencos held in Paris with overwhelming success. He worked with flamenco artists Antonio Canales, Joaquín Cortés, and Israel Galván, who commissioned the musical direction of the show presented at the Bienal de Flamenco de Sevilla in 2000. He participated in the Poveda show of Historias de viva voz which opened the Bienal de Flamenco de Sevilla in 2010.

== Discography ==
- Conexión, with pianist Marco Mezquida 2017
