= The Rough Guide to Flamenco =

Compilation album by Various artists
- Released: 18 November 1997
- Genre: World, Flamenco
- Length: 73:15
- Label: World Music Network

Full series chronology
One Voice: Vocal Music from Around the World (1997)	The Rough Guide to Flamenco (1997)	The Rough Guide to Reggae (1997)

The Rough Guide to Flamenco is a world music compilation album originally released in 1997. Part of the World Music Network Rough Guides series, the album gives broad coverage to the flamenco genre of Spain. The compilation was produced by Phil Stanton, co-founder of the World Music Network. Liner notes were written by Tom Andrews. This was the first of three similarly named albums: the second was released in 2007; the third, in 2013.

== Critical reception ==
Professional ratings
Review scores
Source	Rating
Allmusic	3/5 stars

The Album received mixed reviews. Writing for AllMusic, Adam Greenberg called it a "nice overview of the tradition", but that for purer forms, listeners should "look elsewhere". Michaelangelo Matos of the Chicago Reader claimed it "suffered from compilationitis", losing steam half way through.

== Track listing ==
No.	Title	Artist	Length
1.	"Venta Zoraida (Tangos Paraos)"	Enrique Morente	3:45
2.	"Mi Tiempo (Bulerías)"	Rafael Riqueni	2:14
3.	"Veloz Hacia Su Sino"	Jorge Pardo	4:42
4.	"Bulería de la Mocita (Bulería a Palo Seco)"	Tomasa La Macanita	5:09
5.	"Del Molinete (Taranta y Cartagenera)"	Carmen Linares	4:44
6.	"Pozo del Deseo"	Songhai with Ketama	4:43
7.	"La Voz del Tiempo (Tangos)"	Tomatito with Camarón	4:08
8.	"Y Yo Qué Culpa Tengo (Tangos)"	Miguel Poveda	4:40
9.	"Bodas de Sangre"	Pata Negra	3:03
10.	"Serrana, Que Te Olvidara"	Duquende	5:46
11.	"Del Calvario (Bulerías)"	Jose Soto	3:15
12.	"A Quien Contarle (Malagueña)"	Chano Lobato	7:27
13.	"Dicen de Mí"	Carles Benavent with Paco de Lucía	4:00
14.	"A Mi Tío Lele (Seguidilla)"	Potito	3:56
15.	"A Mi Manuel (Soleá)"	Pepe Habichuela	3:56
16.	"Nana de Colores"	Diego Carrasco	4:17
17.	"Abuelo Pacote (Bulería Por Soleá)"	El Barullo	3:30
