= Sergio Pamies =

Spanish jazz pianist (born 1983)

- Born: Granada (Spain)
- Occupations: Jazz pianist and educator
- Label: Bebyne Records
- Website: www.sergiopamiesmusic.com

Sergio Pamies (born in 1983) is a Spanish jazz pianist, composer, and arranger, who has published four albums under his name, and appears in several recordings as a sideman.

== Biography ==
=== Early years ===
Born in Granada in 1983. He is the nephew of Spanish writer Sergi Pàmies. Sergio Pamies started studying piano at a young age. He started playing jazz because of his father, a self-taught guitarist and jazz aficionado.

Pamies moved to Barcelona, where he graduated with a BM in Jazz Piano (Conservatori Liceu, Barcelona) in 2007. During his time in Barcelona he co-led the group Yakaré. Pamies toured Colombia in 2006 presenting Yakaré's debut album at Jazz al Parque (Bogotá), Festival de Piano de la UIS (Bucaramanga), and Auditorio EAFIT (Medellín). In 2007 Pamies participated as a piano soloist at Joan Albert Amargós’ concerto premiere Transformacions at the Gran Teatre del Liceu (Barcelona).

=== Education ===
After earning his BM at the Conservatori Liceu, Pamies moved to Texas (USA), where he graduated with a master's degree in jazz piano (2011) and a DMA in jazz studies (2016) at the University of North Texas College of Music. During his time at UNT, Pamies was a member of the 7-time Grammy nominated One O’Clock Lab Band, accompanying guest artists such as Bobby McFerrin, Arturo Sandoval, Marvin Stamm, Chuck Findley, Doc Severinsen, and Wycliffe Gordon, among others. He is the soloist in the track “Neil” from Lab 2015, a Rich DeRosa’s composition which garnered a 2016 Grammy Nomination for “Best Instrumental Composition.” Pamies directed the contemporary ensemble “The Zebras,” producing the recording The Flamenco Jazz Project, which was awarded multiple Down Beat Magazine Student Awards. Pamies was selected for the workshop “Latin Jazz Traditions,” performing with Paquito D’Rivera at Carnegie Hall (2015, New York). His composition for Big Band "Dudú" was selected for the concert program.

His dissertation prepared for the degree of Doctor of Musical Arts, The Controversial Identity of Flamenco Jazz: A New Historical and Analytical Approach, is available online at the University of North Texas Library Website.

=== Solo career ===
His debut album, Entre Amigos, was released in 2008 (PSM), with a band that combined jazz musicians with flamenco musicians from Granada, such as Sergio Gómez “El Colorao.” Pamies performed at the XXI Jazz en la Costa International Festival. This album was also presented at the Ibérica Festival (2009), a Flamenco International Festival that organized a 4-days tour in Prague, Brno, Boskovice (Czech Republic), and Bratislava (Slovakia). Pamies performed at Los Veranos del Corral in a concert featuring his mentor, pianist Diego Amador (2009).

His next recording, Borrachito (Bebyne Records), was released in 2011, and it features Christian Scott, Diego Amador, Antonio Serrano, Rubem Dantas, and Pepe Luis Carmona “Habichuela.” Pamies participated in the festivals XVI Jazz Na Starówce (Warsaw, Poland, 2010),Colores Flamencos (Olomouc and Sumperk, Czech Republic, 2011),Munijazz Festival (Munilla, Spain, 2011), XXI Jazz en el Lago (Atarfe, Spain, 2012), XXVII Festival Internacional de Música y Danza Ciudad de Úbeda (Úbeda, Spain, 2015), among others.

Pamies’ album, What Brought You Here? was published in May 2017 by Bebyne Records. It was recorded in Dallas (Texas, USA) and features Quamon Fowler, Ashleigh Smith, Lara Bello, and Samuel Torres.

Pamies' last album, Time to Say, was published on June 28, 2024, by Newtrad. It was recorded in New York in August 2021, and it features Dave Liebman, Paquito D'Rivera, Alex Norris, Michael Thomas, Marshall Gilkes, Samuel Torres, Ricky Rodriguez, and Jimmy Macbride among others.

=== Teaching career ===
Pamies served as a full-time Teaching Fellow at the University of North Texas (Denton, Texas) for eight years. Pamies was an adjunct faculty at Mountain View College (Dallas, Texas), and was one of the instructors at the GDYO Jazz Institute.

Pamies held an adjunct faculty position at The University of Texas at Arlington from 2018 to 2020, where he taught jazz piano, advanced jazz improvisation, composition, arranging, and directed the jazz small group. Pamies was appointed Assistant Professor (jazz piano) at University of Cincinnati, college-Conservatory of Music in August 2020.

Publications

Peer-reviewed journals

- Pamies Rodríguez, Sergio. “‘Well, You Needn’t’: Harmonic Challenges for the Jazz Improviser in Thelonious Monk's Music.” Jazz-hitz (2022, No. 5): 55-85.
- Pamies Rodríguez, Sergio. “Some Remarks on the Pedagogy of Advanced Jazz Improvisation in the 2020s.” Jazz Education in Research and Practice (2022, Vol. 3, No. 1): 97–117.
- Pamies Rodríguez, Sergio. “Wynton Kelly: A Model for Soloing, Comping, and Rhythm Section Interplay.” Jazz-hitz (2021, No. 4): 11–41.
- Pamies Rodríguez, Sergio. “Deconstructing Modal Jazz Piano Techniques: The Relation between Debussy’s Piano Works and the Innovations of Post-bop Pianists.” Jazz Education in Research and Practice(2021, Vol. 2, No. 1): 76–105.

Specialized magazine

- Pamies Rodríguez, Sergio. “Bebop Piano: Examining Bud Powell’s Left-Hand Techniques.” Piano Professional (European Piano Teachers Association), London, Issue 57 (January 2022): 30–34.
- Pamies Rodríguez, Sergio. “Important Considerations for the Jazz Pianist: How to Effectively Create Spontaneous Introductions.” Piano Professional (European Piano Teachers Association), London, Issue 52 (January 2020): 25–27.

Book Reviews

- Pamies Rodríguez, Sergio. “Review of Playing Solo Jazz Piano, by Jeremy Siskind.” Jazz Education in Research and Practice (2023, Vol. 4, No. 1).
- Pamies Rodríguez, Sergio. “Review of Experiencing Chick Corea: A Listener Companion, by Monika Herzig.” Jazz Education in Research and Practice (2022, Vol. 3, No. 1): 140–143.

Dissertation

- Pamies Rodríguez, Sergio. “The Controversial Identity of Flamenco Jazz: A New Historical and Analytical Approach,” Doctor of Musical Arts (Performance-Jazz). University of North Texas Jazz Studies. (May 15, 2016).

=== Style and influences ===
Critics have acknowledged Pamies’ talent for composition, arranging, the lyrical qualities of his playing, and his unique vision for combining flamenco and jazz elements. Pamies has cited Bill Evans, Duke Ellington, Thelonious Monk, Miles Davis, Paco de Lucía, Camarón de la Isla, and the “Habichuela” family (Pepe “Habichuela,” Ketama, Josemi Carmona) among his strongest influences. Jazz critic Troy Dostert wrote about the pianist: "Pamies highlights his substantial bop fluency, and his engaging piano statements are harmonically rich and technically adroit, without needless excess: the economy of Pamies's playing leads to some smart, carefully structured solos. And Pamies's compositions are thoughtful and compelling (...)." Other critics have pointed out his versatility (“Pamies is telling us not to put him in a box. He can play it all”) or his skills as a leader.

== Discography ==
=== As a leader ===
Year	Album	Recording Label	Credits / Notes
2008	Entre Amigos	PSM	Composer, pianist, arranger. Featuring Sergio Gómez “El Colorao” and Gonzalo Del Val.
2011	Borrachito	Bebyne Records	Composer, pianist, arranger. Featuring Christian Scott, Diego Amador, Pepe Luis Carmona “Habichuela,” Rubem Dantas, Antonio Serrano, and Sergio Gómez “El Colorao,” among others.
2017	What Brought You Here?	Bebyne Records	Composer, pianist, arranger. Produced by Daniel Pardo and Sergio Pamies. Featuring Samuel Torres, Ashleigh Smith, Lara Bello, Quamon Fowler, and Brad Kang, among others.
2024	Time to Say	Newtrad	Composer, pianist, arranger. Produced by Samuel Torres. Featuring Dave Liebman, Paquito D'Rivera, Samuel Torres, Marshall Gilkes, Alex Norris, Michael Thomas, Ricky Rodriguez, Jimmy Macbride, Miguel Fernández "El Cheyenne," and Daniel Pardo.

=== As a sideman ===
Year	Album	Recording Label	Artist	Credits / Notes
2006	Yakaré	PSM	Yakaré	Co-leader, pianist, composer, arranger.
2010	Dancing Small	North Texas Jazz	UNT Latin Jazz Lab	Pianist, composer, arranger.
2011	The Flamenco Jazz Project	North Texas Jazz	The UNT Zebras directed by Sergio Pamies	Director, producer, arranger, pianist.
2013	First Impression	Auto produced	Wana Hong	Pianist.
2013	Late Night Mambo	North Texas Jazz	UNT Latin Jazz Lab	Pianist, composer, arranger.
2013	Kind of Two	North Texas Jazz	The Two O’Clock Lab Band	Pianist.
2013	My Shining Hour	MirrorBall Records	Mihwa Kim “Roja”	Producer, pianist, arranger.
2014	Time After	Auto produced	Nazia Chaundry “Naz”	Pianist.
2015	Lab 2015	North Texas Jazz	The One O’Clock Lab Band	Pianist.
2015	Jugar a la Vida	Auto produced	Mónica Gastelumendi	Pianist, arranger.
2015	Cancer Blows, the Musical Event: Thirty Trumpet Legends	The Ryan Anthony Foundation	Robert “Robi” Svärd	Pianist. Featuring Arturo Sandoval, Wycliffe Gordon, Doc Sverinsen, Marvin Stamm, and The One O’Clock Lab Band.
2016	Como mi Sangre	Fods Records	Sergio Gómez “El Colorao”	Pianist, arranger. Featuring “Pepe Habichuela.”
2016	Verso Suelto	Youkali Records	Verso Suelto (Raisa Avilés and Pedro Martínez Maestre)	Producer, pianist, arranger.
2016	Sunkissed	Concord Records	Ashleigh Smith	Pianist, arranger.
2017	The Piano Meets Mariachi	Auto produced	Esteban Álvarez and Mariachi Nuevo Tecalitlán	Arranger
2017	Perseverance: The Music of Rich DeRosa at North Texas	North Texas Jazz	Rich DeRosa and the One O’Clock Lab Band	Pianist. Featured soloist on “Neil” (received a Grammy nomination for Best Instrumental Composition in 2015).
2017	Nice! Jay Saunders’ Best of Two	North Texas Jazz	Jay Saunders and the Two O’Clock Lab Band	Pianist.
2017	1 de Cal y 9 de Arena	Auto produced	Julián Heredia	Pianist, composer, arranger. Featuring Enrique Morente, Jorge Pardo, Josemi Carmona, Carles Benavent, Raimundo Amador.
2017	1 de Cal y 9 de Arena	Auto produced	Julián Heredia	Pianist, composer, arranger. Featuring Enrique Morente, Jorge Pardo, Josemi Carmona, Carles Benavent, Raimundo Amador.
2018	Alquimia	Asphalt Tango Records	Robert “Robi” Svärd	Pianist. Featuring “El Potito,” “Niño Josele.”
2018	The Present	Auto produced	Michelle Alonso	Pianist, co-producer.
2019	Close Your Eyes	Auto produced	Carolyn Lee Jones	Pianist, co-producer, arranger.
2019	Trumpet Bells of Christmas	The Ryan Anthony Foundation	Cancer Blows Big Band	Pianist. Featuring Ryan Anthony, Wayne Bergeron, Andrea Tofanelli, Mike Lovatt, Thomas Gansch, Jens Lindemann, and Stockton Helbing.
2020	Light Sleeper	Armored Records	Stockton Helbing	Pianist. Featuring Stockton Helbing, David Lown, Davy Mooney and James Driscoll.
2021	Flamenco a Voces: Tributo a Morente	Auto produced	M de Puchero	Pianist. Produced by Miguel “El Cheyenne”. Featuring Curro Albaycin, Pepe Luis Carmona “Habichuela,” Jesús del Rosario, La Moneta, among others.
2023	Ocho Perlas de mi Mundo	Auto produced	Estrella de Manuela	Producer, pianist.
