= Paco de Lucía Sextet =

Spanish flamenco ensemble

- Genres: Flamenco
- Years active: 1981–present
- Spinoff of: Paco de Lucía

The Paco de Lucía Sextet is a flamenco music sextet, formed by guitarist Paco de Lucía and other musicians. The band has released three albums. In 1990 Paco de Lucia released Zyryab, an album made with his sextet and also featuring jazz pianist Chick Corea.

== Personnel ==
=== 1981 ===
- Paco de Lucía, guitar
- Pepe de Lucía, cante (vocals)
- Jorge Pardo, flute, soprano saxophone
- Carles Benavent, bass
- Rubem Dantas, percussion
- Ramón de Algeciras, guitar
- Rafael Sánchez de Vargas, guitar

=== 1984 ===
- Paco de Lucía, guitar
- Pepe de Lucía, rhythm guitar
- Jorge Pardo, flute, soprano saxophone
- Carles Benavent, bass
- Rubem Dantas, percussion
- Rafael Sánchez de Vargas, guitar

=== 1997 ===
- Paco de Lucía, guitar
- Duquende, cante (vocals)
- Jorge Pardo, flute, soprano saxophone
- Carles Benavent, bass
- Rubem Dantas, percussion
- Ramón de Algeciras, guitar

== Partial discography ==
- Sólo quiero caminar (1981)
- Live... One Summer Night (1984)
- Live in América (1993)
