= Live... One Summer Night =

Live album by Paco de Lucía Sextet
- Released: 1984
- Genre: Flamenco
- Length: 41:14
- Label: Phonogram

Live... One Summer Night is a live album by Paco de Lucía Sextet, the band formed by famous flamenco guitarist Paco de Lucía.

== Track listing ==
1. "Palenque" – 8:11
2. "Alta mar" – 11:40
3. "Sólo quiero caminar" – 9:50
4. "Chiquito" – 5:55
5. "Gitanos Andaluces" – 5:28

== Musicians ==
- Paco de Lucía – Flamenco guitar
- Ramón de Algeciras – Flamenco guitar
- Carles Benavent – Bass guitar
- Pepe de Lucía – Vocals, Rhythm guitar
- Jorge Pardo – Flute, Soprano saxophone
- Rubem Dantas – Percussion
