= La Macanita =

Spanish flamenco singer (born 1969)

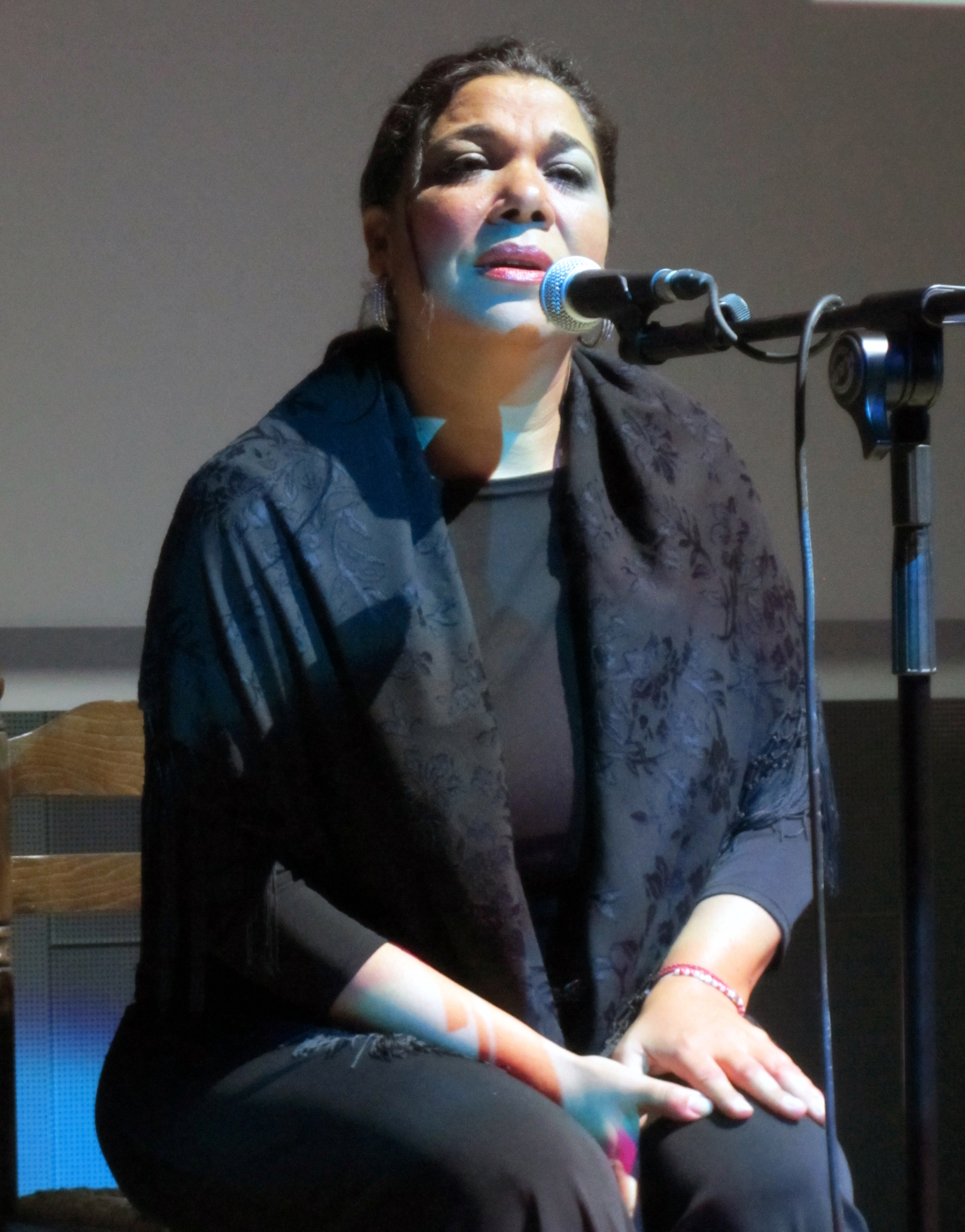
- At the 2013 Festival de Fès in Barcelona
- Born: Tomasa Guerrero Carrasco; 13 June 1969 (age 57); Jerez de la Frontera, Spain
- Occupations: Singer Musical career
- Genre: Flamenco fusion
- Labels: Twin Records, Nuevos Medios S.A.
- Years active: 1989–present

La Macanita is the artistic name of Tomasa Guerrero Carrasco (born 13 June 1969), a Spanish flamenco singer.

== Biography ==
Known by a nickname derived from that of her father, the palmero and accompanist El Macano, this Jerez-born singer is considered one of the most prominent figures of today's flamenco. At age 4 she appeared singing and dancing on the television series Rito y Geografía del Cante. Since then she has toured prestigious tablaos in Spain and participated in international festivals.

Linked to figures such as Manuel Morao and Manolo Sanlúcar, La Macanita stood out early in her career for bulerías, siguiriyas, and villancicos like the one she plays in the 1995 Carlos Saura film Flamenco.

Her first performances were in Jerez de la Frontera, in the children's choir España-Jerez directed by the guitarist Manuel Morao. He organized the Jueves Flamencos with Manuel Carpio and Manolito Parrilla, which then formed part of the Villancico Choir of the Chair of Flamencology. Thanks to the Jerez Savings Bank she recorded several albums, some as soloist.

In 1983, at age 14, La Macanita performed her first recital, together with guitarist Ramón Trujillo, at the Hotel Jerez. In 1985, at 16, she performed at the Madrid tablaos Los Canasteros and Zambra, along with Ramírez, El Torta, El Capullo, and Moraíto Chico.

Her great promoter, Manuel Morao, made her a member of the company Manuel Morao y los Gitanos de Jerez in 1988, participating in the flamenco production Esa Forma de Vivir, and Manolo Sanlúcar incorporated her into the recording of Tauromagia, considered by some theorists to be the definitive flamenco guitar album.

In 1989 she recorded her first album A la Luna Nueva with the Twin Records label (now defunct).

== Selected performances and concerts ==
=== In Spain ===
- At the Universal Exposition of Seville in 1992, La Macanita performed in the show Arco de Santiago, which was presented at the Andalusian pavilion during almost the entire event. For this work she received the Demófilo de Arte Flamenco award.
- In 1994, at the 8th Seville Bienal de Flamenco, she played the role of La Niña de los Peines in 100 Años de Cante. Together with Moraíto Chico she played in the show Lo que es Jerez and sang in the film Flamenco directed by Carlos Saura.
- On 30 January 1997, José Luis Ortiz Nuevo invited her to sing in the show Enrique Morente y Los Jóvenes Flamencos at the Teatro de la Maestranza in Seville.
- On 12 August 1997, she headed the bill at the 37th Festival Nacional del Cante de las Minas in La Unión, about which El País critic Ángel Álvarez Caballero wrote, "La Macanita has such a flamenco voice that its echo thrills."
- On 6 June 2000, she performed at the newly opened Auditori de Barcelona with Manuela Carrasco.
- On 20 September 2000, she performed at the Bajandí concert with Tomatito at the 11th Bienal de Flamenco, along with Moraíto Chico, Luis El Zambo, Carles Benavent, Juana Amaya, Joselito Fernández, and Bernardo Parrilla.
- On 2 July 2001, she performed at the Festival Flamenc de Nou Barris in Barcelona, together with Juana la del Pipa and Dolores Agujetas, presenting Mujerez.
- On 20 May 2009, she performed at the CCCB in the Festival Flamenco de Ciutat Vella.

=== Outside Spain ===
- On Friday 6 August 1996, during the prestigious Festival La Batie de Géneve, La Macanita was acclaimed by an elite audience at the Theatre Alhambra with Moraito Chico and Terremoto Hijo at Al Son de Jerez.
- In May 2000 she held a concert in London's Queen Elizabeth Hall in the cycle The Flamenc Art.
- On 11 May 2000 her concert was broadcast live on the WDR 3 program Matinee der Liedersänger.
- She performed at the 2000 Stimmen Festival in Lörrach, Germany.
- On 11 June 2004, she performed at the Jazz Clubbin in Paris for the Sons d'hiver festival, and her concert was shown on Mezzo TV.
- On 2 April 2001 she performed at the Arab World Institute in Paris in Equinoxe, with the show Andalousies: le flamenco de Séville à Jerez, with Andrés Marín and Javier Puga (musicologist and director of the Mont-de-Marsan Flamenco Festival).
- On 5 July 2012, she participated in the Mont-de-Marsan Flamenco Festival in France, together with Jesús Méndez and Santiago a la Plazuela.
- On 7 June 2013 she participated in the opening of the 19th edition of the World Sacred Music Festival, with a uniquely created show El Amor es mi Religión, directed by Andrés Marín, with the collaboration of Abdallah Ouazzani (musical coordination), the artists Carmen Linares, Françoise Atlan, Chérifa, Bahaâ Ronda, Marouanne Hajji, the El Quad orchestra, and some thirty musicians from the Andalusian Arab, Sufi, Amazigh, and flamenco communities.

== Discography ==
- A la luna nueva (1989), Twin Records
- Con el alma (1992), recorded for Editions Audivis Ethnic (discontinued), for the collection Flamenco Vivo
- Jerez. Xères. Sherry (1998), Nuevos Medios S.A., produced by the Sevillan Ricardo Pachón, with the collaboration of Moraíto Chico and his son Diego, Diego Carrasco, percussionists Manuel Soler and Juan Ruiz, and Cuban pianist Rafael Garcés
- La luna de Tomasa (2002), Flamenco&Duende, Ediciones Senador
- Sólo por eso (2009), Nuevos Medios S.A.
- Caijeré (2015)
- Directo en el Circulo Flamenco de Madrid (CD+DVD, 2017), with the guitar of Manuel Valencia and the palmas of Chicharito and El Macano

== Filmography ==
- Mil y una Lolas (2005)
- El Séptimo de Caballería (1998–1999)
- Flamenco, directed by Carlos Saura (1995)
- La Venta del Duende
- El Sol, la Sal y el Son

== Awards and recognitions ==
- Demófilo Award for Flamenco Art (1992)
- "Real Treasure to the Promotion of the Villancico" Trophy, awarded by the Jerez Association of Belenistas (2002)
- Flamenco Today Prize, awarded to the Best Singing Album of 2009 for Mujerez, to Tomasa "La Macanita", Juana la del Pipa, and Dolores Agujetas
- 2010 Flamenco Today National Critics Prize for the Best Solo Recorded Production for that of La Macanita
- 16th Peña Chaquetón Flamenco Distinction (2010)
- Recognition of the Asociación Secretariado Gitano (2016)
- Andalusia Flag Award, in celebration of the Andalusia Day in the province of Cádiz
- Nominated for the 2017 Latin Grammy Award for Best Flamenco Album
