= Live in América =

Live album by Paco de Lucía Sextet
- Released: November 1993
- Genre: Flamenco
- Length: 60:19
- Label: Polygram Iberica

Live in América is a live album by Paco de Lucía Sextet, the band formed by famous flamenco guitarist Paco de Lucía.

== Track listing ==
1. "Mi Niño Curro (Rondeña)" – 8:31
2. "La Barrosa (Alegría)" – 4:56
3. "Alcázar de Sevilla (Bulería)" – 8:54
4. "Peroche (Tanguillos)" – 6:28
5. "Tío Sabas (Taranta)" – 6:34
6. "Soniquete (Bulería)" – 6:49
7. "Zyryab" – 12:53
8. "Buana Buana King Kong (Rumba)" – 5:14

== Musicians ==
- Paco de Lucía – Flamenco guitar
- Ramón de Algeciras – Flamenco guitar
- Rafael Sánchez de vargas, guitar
- Carles Benavent – Bass guitar
- Pepe de Lucía – Vocals, Rhythm guitar
- Jorge Pardo – Flute, Soprano saxophone
- Rubem Dantas – Percussion
- Manolo Soler – Percussion
