= Pàmies =

Pamies or Pàmies is a Spanish surname. Notable people with the surname include:

== Pamies ==
- Javi Pamies (born 2003), Spanish professional footballer
- Oriol Pamies (born 1989), Spanish entrepreneur and LGBT activist
- Sergio Pamies (born 1983), Spanish jazz pianist, composer, and arranger

== Pàmies ==
- Gaietà Cornet Pàmies (born 1963), Spanish retired 400 metres runner
- Higini Anglès i Pàmies (1888–1969), Spanish priest and musicologist
- Teresa Pàmies (1919–2012), Spanish Catalan-language writer
- Sergi Pàmies (born 1960), Spanish writer, translator, journalist, and television and radio presenter

== See also ==
- Verónica Pamiés (born 1976), Spanish boccia player
