= Dolores Agujetas =

Spanish flamenco singer

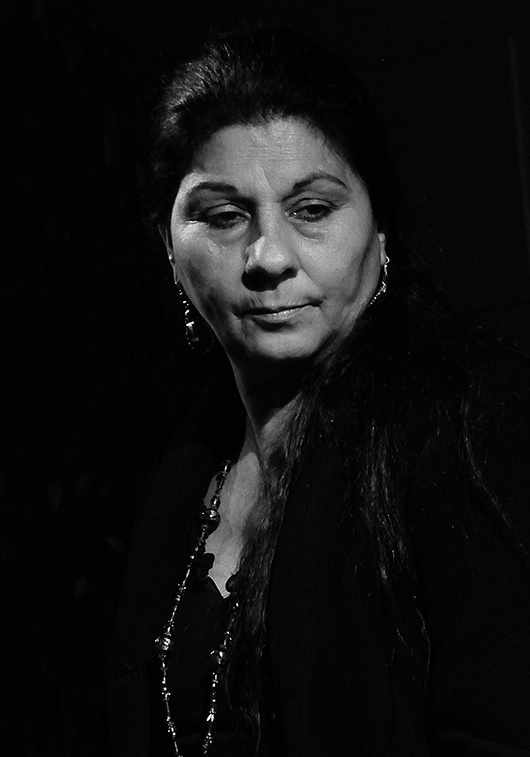
- Dolores Agujeta (2016)

Background information
- Also known as: Dolores La Agujeta
- Born: Dolores de los Santos Bermúdez; 12 May 1960 (age 66); Jerez de la Frontera, Spain
- Genre: flamenco
- Occupation: singer
- Instrument: Voice

Dolores de los Santos Bermúdez (stage name, Dolores Agujetas or Dolores La Agujeta; Jerez de la Frontera, 12 May 1960) is a Spanish Romani flamenco singer. Hailing from a renowned flamenco Romani family, she is the daughter of Manuel de los Santos Pastor (Manuel Agujetas), and granddaughter of Agujetas el Viejo.

== Biography ==
Dolores Agujetas made her debut in Jerez in 1991, accompanied on guitar by Parrilla de Jerez. This first professional attempt was a hit among fans.

In the year 2000, she recorded her first CD. Since her first performances, she was called to sing in various parts of the world such as Japan, Holland, France, Germany, and Belgium. She was also requested to appear in theaters, festivals, flamenco clubs, and tablaos, thus becoming more and more important in the flamenco world. She has performed at numerous national and international festivals, including in Madrid, Barcelona, Seville, Bilbao, Córdoba, Granada, Pamplona, Cádiz, and Jerez de la Frontera. In 2009, she recorded the CD Mujerez with Juana la del Pipa, La Macanita, and Moraíto Chico II, which won the National Awards of the critics at Flamenco Hoy for the best album of singing and accompaniment. This album originated the show Mujerez that performed at important functions in Brussels, Amsterdam, Nîmes (Flamenco Festival), Bilbao, Granada (Alhambra Theatre), Cordoba (Plaza de la Corredera), Barcelona (Nou Barris Festival), Teatro Lope de Vega (Bienal de Sevilla 2010), and finally in Madrid (Auditorio Nacional de la Música within the cycle Andalucía Flamenca 2012). Her album in digital edition VIVO was recorded live, accompanied on guitar by her son Agujetas Chico, in the hall of the Peña Flamenca la Bulería during the International Flamenco Festival of Jerez.

== Discography ==
- Hija del duende (2000)
- Dolores la Agujeta (2004)
- Mujerez (2009) (with Juana la del Pipa & La Macanita)
- Cantaora (2016)
