= Sólo quiero caminar =

Sólo quiero caminar may refer to:

- Just Walking (orig. Sólo quiero caminar), a 2008 Spanish-Mexican crime thriller film
- Sólo quiero caminar (album), an album by Paco de Lucía
