= Vicente Soto Sordera =

Vicente Soto "Sordera"
- Born: Vicente Soto Barea; April 1, 1954 (age 72)
- Origin: Barrio de Santiago, Jerez de la Frontera, Andalusia, Spain
- Genres: Flamenco
- Occupations: Singer, composer
- Years active: 1966–present
- Website: http://www.vicentesoto.com/

Vicente Soto Sordera (born in 1954 in Santiago, Jerez de la Frontera, Spain) is a flamenco cantaor (singer) who belongs to one of the most important Flamenco families in history, "Los Sordera".

== Family ==
He's owner of one of the most significant legates from the Flamenco planet, as he's the great-grandson of Niño Gloria and nineteenth-century seguiriya maestro Paco la Luz. He is also son of Manuel Soto Sordera, the patriarch of Jerez flamenco, and cousin of José Mercé.

== Career ==
Vicente Soto is considered one of the artists with the most complete knowledge of Flamenco, a performer who has interpreted almost every palo (the different flamenco styles), and is also considered a living example of "pure" flamenco tradition. He's got many distinctions and Flamenco awards (Premio Nacional de Cordoba, Premio Pastora Pavon, Premio Mairena del Alcor...). At the same time the work of Vicente Soto "Sordera" has always been innovative as he has demonstrated with his musical adaptations of the lyrics of some of the big names of hispanic poetry: Antonio Machado, Miguel de Cervantes, Miguel de Unamuno, Federico García Lorca or Rubén Darío.

Vicente Soto has performed at many Flamenco and Latin Festivals in the world and big world stages as: La Scala di Milan, Theatre National de Paris, Teatro Avenida de Buenos Aires, Teatro Comunale di Roma, Theatre Albeniz de Madrid, Theatre Sao Luiz de Lisboa... and all over USA, Japan, South America, Australia, France, Germany, Spain, Canada, Austria, Hungary, Holland, etc.

== Discography ==
Vicente Soto has recorded 13 CDs with guitarists such as Vicente Amigo, Tomatito, Paco Cepero, Enrique de Melchor, Moraito, José María Molero, Pepe Habichuela, Gerardo Núñez, Manuel Parrilla, Diego del Morao, Manuel Valencia, Miguel Salado, etc.

- Pessoa Flamenco (RTVE, 1986)
- Cuando canta el pasado (Warner Music, 1987)
- El ritmo de la sangre (Warner Music, 1988)
- Jondo espejo gitano (Discos Senador, 1990)
- Tríptico Flamenco Cádiz (RTVE, 1994)
- Tríptico Flamenco Jerez (RTVE, 1995)
- Tríptico Flamenco Sevilla (RTVE,1996)
- Verea del Camino (Sonifolk, 1997)
- Entre dos mundos (Dro East West, 2000)
- Latin Essentials (Warner Music, 2003)
- Estar Alegre (Galileo-MC, 2005)
- Colores Distintos (Romanó Sonor, 2012)
- Coplas del desagravio (2018)
