= Mayte Martín =

Spanish singer (born 1965)

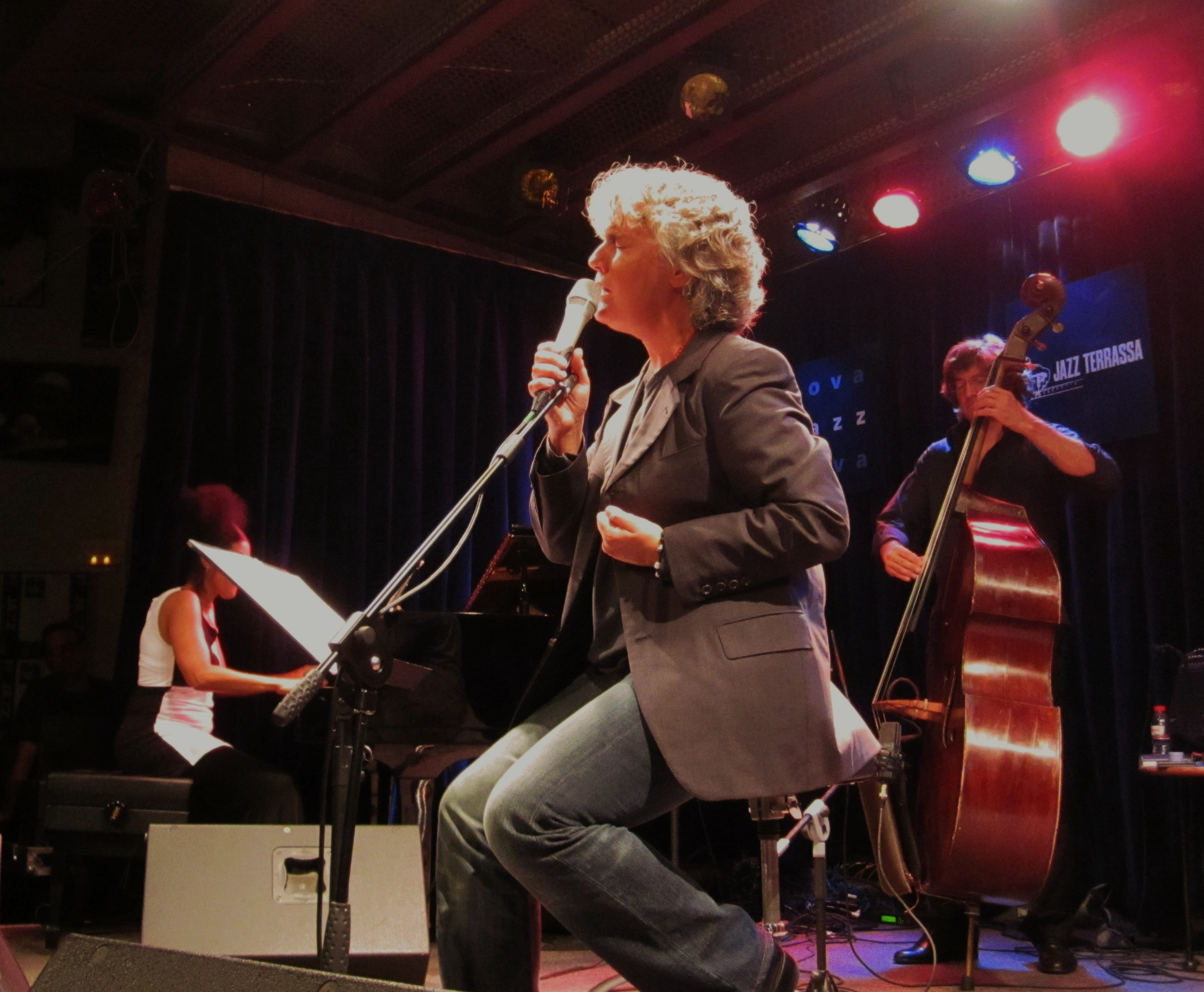
- Martín in 2012

Background information
- Birth name: María Teresa Martín Cadierno
- Born: 1965 (age 59–60); Barcelona, Spain
- Origin: Catalonia, Spain
- Genres: Flamenco; bolero; Latin music; jazz
- Occupations: Singer; guitarist; composer
- Instruments: Vocals; guitar
- Years active: 1975–present
- Website: maytemartin.com

María Teresa Martín Cadiemo (born 1965) is a Spanish singer.

== Early life ==
Martín was born in 1965 in Barcelona, Spain. Her mother was from Catalonia, and her father was from Málaga, Andalusia.

While on a holiday in Cartagena, her father entered her in a Flamenco/cante contest, which she won. She expanded her knowledge of flamenco styles by listening to recordings of singers such as Juan Valderrama, Manolo Caracol, Camarón de la Isla, Lole Montoya, and Pastora Pavón Cruz (also known as La Niña de los Peines). She also received formal musical training and worked as a "Cantaora de atrás" (singer for flamenco dance).

== Career ==
In 1987, she won the Lámpara Minera prize at the Concurso Nacional de La Unión (aka Festival de las Minas). Two years later, she won the Antonio Chacón Prize for malagueña at the Concurso Nacional de Arte Flamenco de Córdoba. She began an international career after being chosen by Peter Gabriel to perform at WOMAD Festivals in 2009.

In 1993, she began touring with jazz pianist Tete Montoliu. Their professional relationship continued until Montoliu's death in 1997. Together they recorded 'Free Boleros' live in 1996. On her second bolero recording, 'Tiempo de Amar' (2002), Omara Portuondo appeared as a guest artist on some tracks.

In 1994, she recorded her first album, Muy Frágil, with guitarist Chicuelo and arrangements by Joan Albert Amargós, who has collaborated with other flamenco musicians like Paco de Lucía and Camarón de la Isla. In 2000, she released her second flamenco recording, 'Querencia', which was nominated for the Latin Grammy Award for Best Flamenco Album in 2001.

In 1996, she resumed her work as a singer for a dance, collaborating with flamenco dancer Belén Maya. They have toured internationally with the productions "Mayte Martín + Belén Maya" (since 1996) and "Flamenco de Cámara" (since 2003).

In 1997, she received the Barcelona City Award from the City Council and the National Music Award in the category of "Best Flamenco Composer".

In 2005, she commemorated 30 years as a performer with a concert titled 'Mis 30 años de amor al arte' at the Palau de la Música Catalana. She subsequently toured Spain and other European countries.

In June 2006, she participated in a tribute tour for Leonard Cohen, alongside Martirio, Kiko Veneno, Javier Colis, and Luz Casal. She performed a Spanish version of "Hey, That's No Way to Say Goodbye". The tour was documented on the 2012 reissue of the CD "According to Leonard Cohen."

In 2007, classical pianists duo Katia and Marielle Labèque commissioned her for a project featuring Spanish and classical music, which toured for several years. Joan Albert Amargos and Luis Vidal composed the arrangements for two pianos. The resulting recording included traditional songs as well as compositions by Manuel de Falla, Federico García Lorca, Enrique Granados, Joaquín Rodrigo, Paco de Lucía, and Martín herself.

In 2009, poet José Luis Ortiz Nuevo commissioned her to compose music for the poems of Málaga-born poet Manuel Alcántara for the flamenco festival of Málaga. This work was later released as the CD Al cantar a Manuel, recorded with guitarists José Luis Montón and Juan Ramón Caro, percussionist Chico Fargas, and other musicians.

In 2012, opting for an independent release, she pursued a new recording project using crowdfunding. She recorded live performances of bolero and other Latin American music at the Barcelona venue Luz de Gas. The recording was released under the title Cosas de dos.

In 2013, with guitarists Jose Luis Montón and Juan Ramón Caro and percussionist Chico Fargas, she premiered a new project for the Barcelona flamenco festival titled "Por los muertos del cante", featuring interpretations of traditional flamenco songs.

Her 2018 album, Tempo Rubato, is a collaboration with a string quartet.

== Recordings ==
- Muy Frágil, K-Industria Cultural (1994)
- Free Boleros, K-Industria Cultural (1996)
- Querencia, Virgin (2000)
- Tiempo de Amar, Virgin (2002)
- De fuego y de agua, KLM, with the sisters Katia and Marielle Labèque (2008)
- Al cantar a Manuel, Nuevos Medios S.A (2009)
- Cosas de dos (2012)
- Tempo Rubato (2018)
