= Duquende =

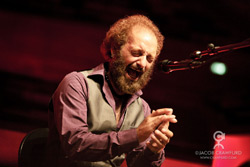
- Duquende at WOMEX 2011

Background information
- Born: Juan Rafael Cortés Santiago; 1965 (age 60–61); Sabadell, Spain
- Genre: Flamenco
- Occupation: Singer
- Formerly of: Paco de Lucía Sextet

Juan Rafael Cortés Santiago, known as Duquende (born 1965 in Sabadell, Spain), is a Spanish Romani flamenco singer (cantaor). He is considered one of the successors to influential Flamenco singer Camarón de la Isla. Since 1997, Duquende has been a member of the Paco de Lucía Sextet in addition to working as a solo artist.

In 1995, Duquende was the first cantaor to be invited to perform at the Champs Elysées theatre in Paris.

In 2000, he performed with the Naumburg Orchestral Concerts, in the Naumburg Bandshell, Central Park, in the summer series.

== Discography ==
- Soy el duende (1988) (Divucsa).
- A mi aire (1989) (Divucsa).
- Duquende con Manzanita (1990) (Divucsa).
- Duquende y la guitarra de Tomatito (1993) (Nuevos Medios).
- Samaruco (2000) (Universal), guitars of Paco de Lucía and Juan Manuel Cañizares, the drumm Tino di Geraldo, the bass Carles Benavent.
- Mi forma de vivir (2005) (K-Industria), con Chicuelo y Niño Josele the guitars.
- Qawwali Flamenco (CD+DVD, 2006) (Accords Croisés), starts in 2003 together Miguel Poveda and Faiz Ali Faiz, with the guitar of Chicuelo.
- Mi forma de vivir (2006)
- Live in Cirque d´Hiver - París (2007) (Flamenco Producción), direct to París. Disc on direct with de player guitar Juan Gómez "Chicuelo" and the box bye Isaac el Rubio.
- Rompecabezas (2012).

Contributing artist

- The Rough Guide to Flamenco (1997, World Music Network)
- Unwired: Acoustic Music from Around the World (1999, World Music Network)
- Juan Carmona (Borboreo, 1996 y Caminos nuevos, 2000)
- Juan Gómez "Chicuelo" (Cómplices, 2000)
- Paco de Lucía (Luzia, 1998; EnVivo, 2011).
- Jabier Muguruza (Konplizeak, 2007).
- Vicente Amigo (Vivencias imaginadas,1995).
