= One Voice: Vocal Music from Around the World =

Compilation album by Various artists
- Released: 9 September 1997
- Genre: World, Vocal
- Length: 69:13
- Label: World Music Network

Full series chronology
Best of Latin America (1997)	One Voice: Vocal Music from Around the World (1997)	The Rough Guide to Flamenco (1997)

One Voice: Vocal Music from Around the World is a world music compilation album originally released in 1997. Part of the World Music Network Rough Guides series, the release features vocal music, ranging from Gregorian chants to Tuvan throat singing. The compilation was produced by Phil Stanton, co-founder of the World Music Network. Liner notes were written by BBC broadcaster Andy Kershaw, known for his world music journalism. It was produced in partnership with New Internationalist magazine.

Countries represented in this compilation include South Africa, Bulgaria, England, the United States, Italy, Finland, Switzerland, Bahrain, Ireland, Zimbabwe, Tahiti, Tuva and Nepal.

== Critical reception ==
Professional ratings
Review scores
Source	Rating
Allmusic	2.5/5 stars

Writing for AllMusic, Adam Greenberg compared the album to Putumayo releases, describing it as more of a "sampler" than the typical Rough Guide "stand-alone compilation". Greenberg felt that while the album "doesn't exactly make sense musically" and lacks a "consistent atmosphere", it does showcase the voice's versatility and beauty.

== Track listing ==
No.	Title	Artist (Country)	Length
1.	"Izithembiso Zenkosi"	Ladysmith Black Mambazo (South Africa)	3:34
2.	"Prochula Se Moma Nedelya"	Trio Bulgarka (Bulgaria)	2:13
3.	"Tender Comrade"	Billy Bragg (England)	2:53
4.	"Jerusalem Revisited"	Coope Boyes and Simpson (England)	4:57
5.	"Ever Widening Circles of Remorse"	Ned Sublette/Lawrence Weiner/The Persuasions (United States)	3:21
6.	"Cantu A Ballu Seriu"	Tenores di Bitti (Italy)	4:00
7.	"Heilani Saattelin Amerikkahan"	Anna-Kaisa Liedes (Finland)	2:52
8.	"Puisque Je T'Aime, Pars"	Laurence Revey (Switzerland)	2:11
9.	"Ifjirie (My Dawn)"	The Pearl Divers of Bahrain	6:53
10.	"Bean An Leanna (The Woman With the Beer)"	Joe Heaney (Republic of Ireland)	3:09
11.	"Blood and Gold/Mohacs"	Silly Sisters (England)	3:51
12.	"The Grey Cock"	Eliza Carthy (England)	4:02
13.	"E Hó Hì"	Talitha MacKenzie (United States)	1:24
14.	"Bazali Bethu (Jazz Song)"	Black Umfolosi (Zimbabwe)	3:39
15.	"Himene Tarava"	Tamarii Pirae of Tahiti (French Polynesia)	3:53
16.	"Throat Singing - Five Styles"	Shu-De (Tuva)	6:54
17.	"Benza Guru"	Tibetan Buddhist Monks of the Shechen Tennyi Dargyeling Monastery, Nepal	3:22
18.	"Introitus - Da Pacem"	Cantori Gregoriani (Italy)	2:11
19.	"Study War No More"	Sweet Honey in the Rock (United States)	4:56
