= Sólo quiero caminar (album) =

Studio album by Paco de Lucía
- Released: 1981
- Genre: Flamenco
- Length: 36:55
- Label: Phonogram
- Producer: Jose Torregrosa

Paco de Lucía chronology
Friday Night in San Francisco	Sólo quiero caminar	Passion, Grace and Fire

Sólo quiero caminar (I Only Want to Walk) is the fourteenth studio album by the Spanish composer and guitarist Paco de Lucía. All tunes were written by Paco de Lucía.

== Track listing ==
1. "Sólo quiero caminar" (Tangos) (Paco de Lucía, Pepe de Lucía) – 6:16
2. "La Tumbona" (Bulerías) – 4:19
3. "Convite" (Rumba) – 3:55
4. "Montiño" (Fandangos de Huelva) – 4:02
5. "Chanela" (Rumba) – 3:56
6. "Monasterio de sal" (Colombianas) – 4:52
7. "Piñonate" (Bulerías) – 4:44
8. "Palenque" – 4:51

== Musicians ==
- Paco de Lucía – Flamenco guitar
- Ramón de Algeciras – second guitar
- Pepe de Lucía – vocals
- Rubem Dantas – percussion
- Carles Benavent – bass
- Jorge Pardo – flute, saxophone
