= Al-Andalus Ensemble =

Al-Andalus Ensemble is a husband and wife musical duo that performed contemporary Andalusi music. The ensemble featured Tarik Banzi playing oud, ney and darbuka, and Julia Banzi on flamenco guitar.

Tarik Banzi was born in Morocco, and Julia, one of the few well-known female flamenco guitarists, is a native of Denver.

== Style ==
The Al-Andalus Ensemble played both traditional Andalusian music and contemporary works, which draw much of their inspiration from the music of Arabo-Andalusian, Spanish Flamenco, Medieval Spanish, Ladino (Jewish-Spanish) melodies, North African and Arabic rhythms, as well as jazz, Classical, South Indian and Western classical music., with vocals in Spanish, Arabic, Ladino and English to create the musical style which has been labeled "contemporary Andalusian."

They sought to sustain and continue the Andalusian classical music traditions of Tarik's native Morocco and his ancestors' home in Moorish Andalusia. Ted Gioia, author of The History of Jazz, likened Al-Andalus Ensemble's creation of the "contemporary Andalusian" genre to Astor Piazzolla's creation of Nuevo Tango style, essentially saying that both these sets of musicians had revitalized traditional musical styles that were growing stagnant by embracing multicultural influences that allowed them to transform and modernize their traditional music.

Many of the instruments they used in their performances are traditional North African and Middle Eastern instruments: the oud, kamanja, darbuka, tar and rebab, as well as the flamenco cajón, guitar, and palmas and Western instruments such as the flute, saxophone, drum set and piano. Their work is sometimes accompanied by dance performances, including dancers and other world-music specialists.

Robert McBride, music director for Oregon Public Broadcasting, described their music as "something timeless, wonderful and very stimulating."

Tarik Banzi, descended from Moorish Andalusians who fled Spain during the Spanish Reconquest, is a visual artist as well as a musician and composer. He holds a doctorate in Fine Arts from the Complutense University of Madrid, Spain and his paintings have been exhibited internationally. He was also an active member of the Madrid flamenco music scene since the late 1970s until the early 1980s, including membership in the jazz-flamenco fusion band Guadalquivir. He performed and recorded with flamenco master musicians such as Paco de Lucia, Manolo Sanlucar, Enrique Morente and Jorge Pardo and it has been claimed that Tarik introduced the use of the darbuka and Udu to flamenco music. Two of his students, Fain Duenas and Vicente Molina, went on to form the Grammy-nominated world music group Radio Tarifa.

Julia Banzi holds a PhD in ethnomusicology from the University of California, Santa Barbara and specializes in flamenco and women's performance of Andalusian music. She lived in Spain for many years and studied flamenco with Isidro Munoz, Manolo Sanlucar, David Serva and Juan Maya "Marote." She is one of a very few female flamenco guitarists worldwide. Her PhD dissertation from the University of California at Santa Barbara discusses modern changes in flamenco and is titled "Flamenco Guitar Innovation and the Circumscription of Tradition" (2007). Her Master thesis "“Women’s Andalusian Ensembles of Tetuan, Morocco" (2002) is the result of over 15 years of research into women's ensembles in North Africa (Morocco). She contributed two chapters on Moroccan and Spanish food and women's performance to the multi-authored book The Ethnomusicologists' Cookbook: Complete Meals from Around the World (Routledge 2006). She teaches guitar at Reed College and Lewis & Clark College in Portland, Oregon.

The ensemble's membership of musicians and dancers shifted with its performance needs, and past and current members have include Grammy Award-winning violinist and founder of Shadowfax Charlie Bisharat, Boujemaa Razgui, whose flutes were destroyed by US Customs, Billy Oskay Nightnoise, Jorge Pardo, Pink Martini Gavin Bondy and Martín Zarzar, Anthony Jones, Joe Heinemann, Ranjani Krishnan and Margarita Bruce. and Pink Martini members Martín Zarzar and Gavin Bondy as well as Moroccan musician Noureddine Chekara, Spanish singer Virtudes Sanchez, American singer Emily Miles, Basque flamenco dancer Laura Dubroca and Spanish flamenco dancer Maria Jose Franco.

== Historical influences ==
The Al-Andalus Ensemble takes its name and much of its inspiration from al-Andalus. Historically, "al-Andalus" refers to Moorish Iberia, or parts of the Iberian Peninsula governed by Muslims between 711 and 1492. During these eight centuries, Andalusian Spain witnessed cultural cooperation and innovation between Africa, the East and the West as well as between Muslims, Jews and Christians. The Al-Andalus Ensemble follows the model of Al-Andalus in composition and performance, drawing on many cultures and traditions to present the suggestion of intercultural peace and artistic innovation.

== Educational programs ==
The ensemble won the University of California, Santa Barbara-based California ArtsBridge award for their K-12 educational program "Journey from Baghdad to Cordoba". The "Baghdad.." program is now part of the Young Audiences association to bring the arts into schools throughout North America.

== Discography ==
The Al-Andalus Ensemble's work can be heard on their recordings:

- Liman: For Whom? (1990)
- Illumination (1992)
- Genetic Memories (1998)
- Vision (2000)
- Alchemy (2006)
- 21 Strings (2009)
- Andalusian Love Songs (2012)

Tarik Banzi also recorded one album with Joe Heinemann:

- Free Fall (2013)

== Awards ==
- The title song from the Al-Andalus Ensemble's album Alchemy was awarded the JPFolks Award also known as the "People's Grammy Award" for “Best World Music Song of 2009." The song Alchemy features simply oud and guitar and was selected from over 560,000 songs entered from 163 countries around the world in what is the world's largest Independent Music Awards.
- The album "21 Strings" was nominated for "Best Contemporary Classical Album of 2010" in the 9th annual Independent Music Awards.
- California ArtsBridge award: "Best in Creative and Complete Planning for Teaching Arts in the Public Schools.”
- Julia Banzi was selected for the Rotary Ambassadorial Scholar to Morocco by the Rotary Club of Santa Barbara North.
