= The Ultimate Adventure =

Studio album by Chick Corea
- Released: February 7, 2006
- Recorded: 2005
- Studios: Mad Hatter Studios, Los Angeles, California, U.S.
- Genres: Jazz, world fusion, jazz fusion
- Length: 73:07
- Label: Stretch
- Producer: Chick Corea

Chick Corea chronology
Rhumba Flamenco (2005)	The Ultimate Adventure (2006)	Super Trio (2006)

Professional ratings
Review scores
Source	Rating
All About Jazz	4.5/5 stars
AllMusic	3/5 stars
The Penguin Guide to Jazz Recordings	2.5/4 stars

The Ultimate Adventure is an album recorded by Chick Corea and released in 2006.

Like his 2004 album To the Stars, The Ultimate Adventure is a musical tribute to the work of science fiction author and Scientology founder L. Ron Hubbard. The album draws heavily upon the rhythmic and melodic traditions of African, Spanish, and Arabian music.

The Ultimate Adventure peaked at number 7 in the Billboard Top Jazz albums and also won two Grammy awards in 2007 for Best Jazz Instrumental Performance (Individual or Group) and Best Instrumental Arrangement.

== Track listing ==
All music composed by Chick Corea

1. "Three Ghouls, Pt. 1" – 1:38
2. "Three Ghouls, Pt. 2" – 4:02
3. "Three Ghouls, Pt. 3" – 3:11
4. "City of Brass" – 6:38
5. "Queen Tedmur" – 5:15
6. "El Stephen, Pt. 1" – 6:39
7. "El Stephen, Pt. 2" – 1:47
8. "King & Queen" – 6:06
9. "Moseb the Executioner, Pt. 1" – 1:39
10. "Moseb the Executioner, Pt. 2" – 2:20
11. "Moseb the Executioner, Pt. 3" – 1:54
12. "North Africa" – 6:24
13. "Flight from Karoof, Pt. 1" – 6:11
14. "Flight from Karoof, Pt. 2" – 1:36
15. "Planes of Existence, Pt. 1" – 5:25
16. "Arabian Nights, Pt. 1" – 4:30
17. "Arabian Nights, Pt. 2" – 2:38
18. "Gods & Devils" – 2:15
19. "Planes of Existence, Pt. 2" – 2:50

== Personnel ==
Musicians

- Chick Corea – acoustic piano, Fender Rhodes electric piano, acoustic and electronic percussion, synthesizers
- Hubert Laws – flute (on "Three Ghouls", "Queen Tedmur")
- Jorge Pardo – flute, saxophone, palmas handclaps ("City of Brass", "El Stephen", "King & Queen", "North Africa", "Flight from Karoof", "Planes of Existence", "Gods & Devils")
- Tim Garland – bass clarinet (on "Queen Tedmur"), tenor saxophone (on "Moseb the Executioner")
- Frank Gambale – acoustic guitar (on "Arabian Nights")
- Carles Benavent – electric bass, palmas handclaps
- Steve Gadd – drums, palmas handclaps (on "Three Ghouls", "El Stephen", "Flight from Karoof")
- Vinnie Colaiuta – drums (on "Queen Tedmur", "Moseb the Executioner", "North Africa", "Arabian Nights")
- Tom Brechtlein – drums, palmas handclaps (on "King & Queen", "Planes of Existence")
- Airto Moreira – percussion (on "Three Ghouls", "Moseb the Executioner", "North Africa"), vocals
- Hossam Ramzy – percussion (on "City of Brass", "Flight from Karoof")
- Rubem Dantas (in Spanish) – percussion, palmas handclaps (on "King & Queen", "Moseb the Executioner", "North Africa", "Planes of Existence", "Arabian Nights", "Gods & Devils")

Production personnel

- Bernie Kirsh – recording engineer
- Al Schmitt – mixing engineer
- Buck Snow – mixing engineer
- Doug Sax – mastering engineer

== Chart performance ==
Year	Chart	Position
2006	Billboard Top Jazz Albums	7
