= Hector Martignon =

Colombian pianist and composer

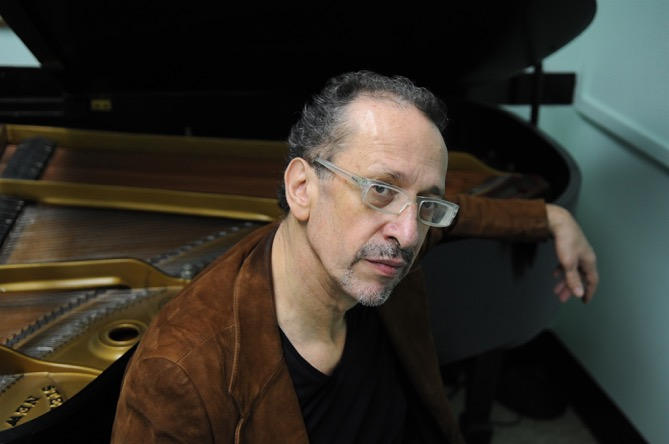
- Hector Martignon

Background information
- Birth name: Hector Martignon
- Born: Bogotá, Colombia
- Genres: Jazz, Latin jazz, Afro-Cuban jazz, Classical
- Occupation(s): Musician, bandleader, music teacher
- Instrument(s): Piano, Accordion
- Years active: 1980s–present
- Website: www.hectormartignon.com

Hector Martignon is a Colombian pianist and composer of Italian descent living in New York City. Two of Martignon's albums have been nominated for a Grammy Award: Refugee (2007) and Second Chance (2010). Martignon is known for crossbreeding the improvisational language of Jazz with diverse musical idioms, such as Classical European, Latin American folklore and World Music. On its exhibit Latin Jazz, the Smithsonian Institution lists Martignon among the leading artists “exploring the regional sources of Latin Jazz”.

== Training ==
At age 18, Martignon abandoned his engineering studies in Colombia in order to formally study music in Germany, where he attained a bachelor's degree in Piano Performance at the Hochschule für Musik Freiburg, under Robert-Alexander Bohnke. There he received instruction from Swiss composer Klaus Huber on the rudiments of composition and instrumentation, attending related Seminars and Master Classes from the likes of György Ligeti, Luigi Nono and Luciano Berio, who routinely taught in Freiburg on their way to nearby Donaueschingen Festival and Darmstadt International Summer Courses for New Music. He was awarded a master's degree at Manhattan School of Music, studying Jazz Piano with Kenny Barron and Classical Piano with Solomon Mikowsky. There he attended composition courses with Czech composer Ludmila Ulehla.

== Musical career ==
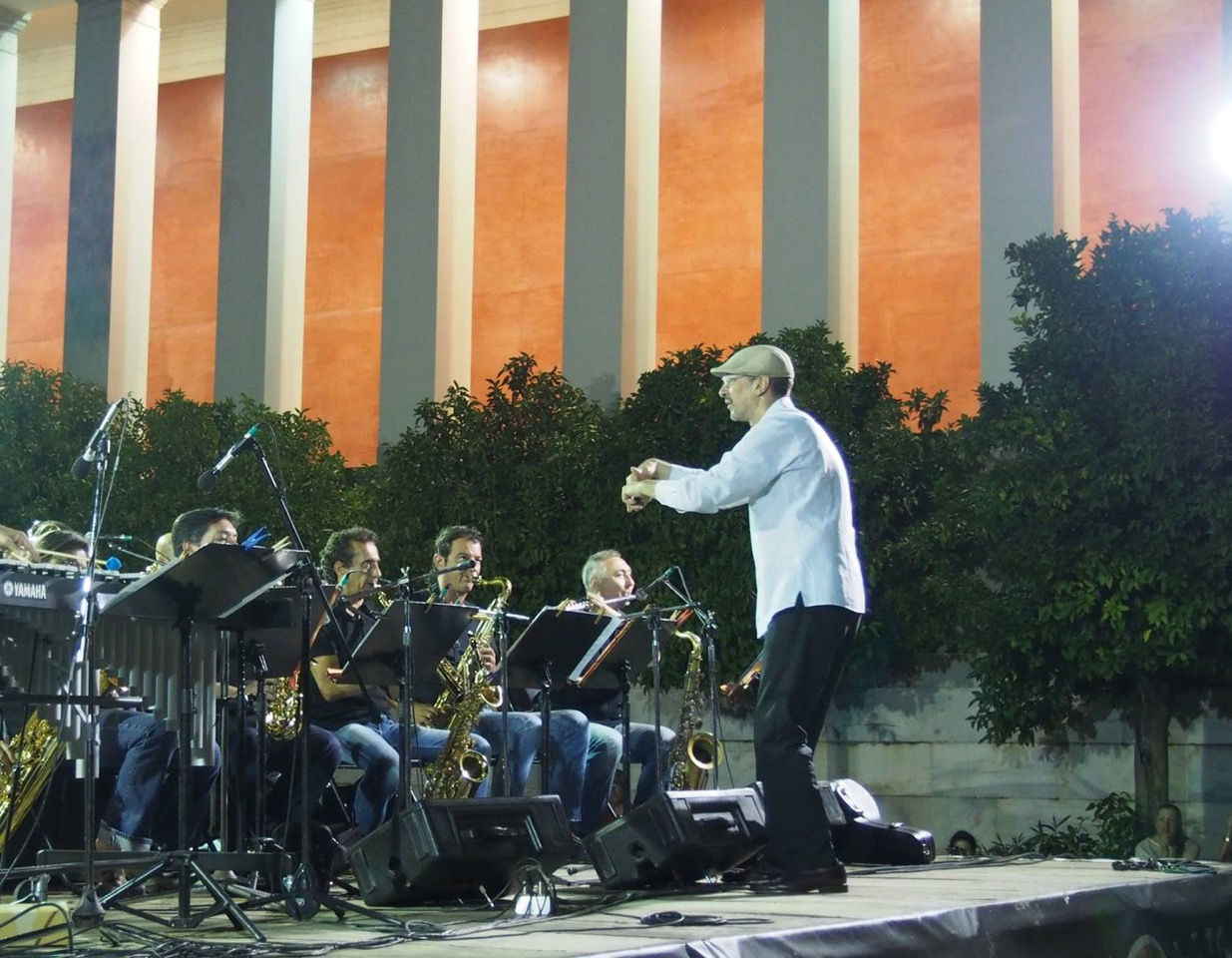
Conducting the Athens Radio Big Band

During his studies, Martignon backed Salsa singers like Celia Cruz, Ismael Miranda and Pete “Conde” Rodriguez on their European tours, mostly in US Army bases in Germany. His first professional recording was with Greek composer Mikis Theodorakis on his Canto General. Moving to New York city in 1989, Martignon joined both the Salsa band and the Jazz ensemble of Ray Barretto, New World Spirit, from 1990 to 1998, contributing compositions and arrangements, as well as keyboard work, to 5 albums, including the Grammy-nominated My Summertime (1995). (John Storm Roberts, Latin Jazz, ISBN 0-02864681-9, pages 222, 230). Martignon also toured with Mongo Santamaría, Gato Barbieri, Steve Turre, Paquito D’Rivera, Don Byron and was invited to perform with Max Roach Project America featuring Tito Puente.

In 1996 Martignon started in earnest a dedicated solo career, performing in music festivals, theaters, clubs and colleges worldwide, releasing in 1997 a first of six albums as a leader, Portrait in White and Black (John Storm Roberts, Latin Jazz, ISBN 0-02864681-9, page 242) featuring Barretto and Donny McCaslin. Two later albums, Refugee (2007) and Second Chance (2010) were each nominated for a Grammy Award. The Big Band Theory, a big band-plus-strings formatted album with all arrangements and six compositions written by Martignon, was listed as one of Downbeat Magazine’s 'Best Albums of 2016'. In it Martignon displays his Jazz prowess alongside a Classical perspective in orchestration, combining original strings with modern brass and woodwind harmonies and Afro Cuban rhythmics in Bach's Aria Erbarme dich, from the St Matheus Passion.

== Film and theater ==
Martignon wrote the scores for one feature film, Septimo Cielo, a short for HBO, From Dusk till Dawn and for two plays for Repertorio Español in New York, Ana en el Trópico and award-winning Cita a Ciegas. He performed all piano parts for Eat Drink Man Woman, an Oscar-nominated film by Ang Lee, arranging and producing some of the cuts. His Broadway experience as pianist, arranger, assistant director and musical director is extensive and includes productions such as The Capeman, Chronicle of a Death Foretold at Lincoln Center, The Mambo Kings and Selena Forever. Between 2018 and 2019, Martignon toured 10 cities in Cuba, Europe and China as musical director and pianist of the Cuban Musical Carmen la Cubana, written and directed by British director Christopher Renshaw based on Bizet's opera Carmen.

== Teaching ==
Alongside his performing career, Martignon has been actively engaged in the musical training of young generations, teaching Jazz Composition at the Hochschule für Musik und Theater München, and at the Ludwigsburg University of Education, in Germany. In 2017 Martignon was the piano instructor at the yearly Jazz is Back Summer Festival in Groznjan, Croatia. He has conducted master classes at Berklee College of Music, the Sunderman Conservatory at Gettysburg College; the Geneva Conservatory; EJMA, the Jazz department of the Lausanne Conservatory, in Switzerland; and at Tokyo University.

Since January 2020 he teaches theory, history and Jazz composition at the department of music at Hofstra University.

== Publications ==
Martignon wrote the Salsa Piano Book, commissioned and published by Hal Leonard. Apart from his own albums, he was commissioned to write liner notes for releases by Chris Bergson, Eddie Martinez, Nelson Riveros and Andrés Cuadros de Bejar.

== Discography ==
=== As a leader ===
- Portrait in White and Black (Candid, 1996)
- The Foreign Affair (Candid, 1998)
- Refugee (Zoho Music, 2007)
- Live at Birdland (GMN, 2008)
- Second Chance (Zoho Music, 2010)
- The Big Band Theory (Zoho Music, 2016)

=== As a co-leader ===
- Burgstaller-Martignon-4 Mozart’s Blue Fantasies (Summit, 2009)
- Burgstaller-Martignon-4 Bach’s Secret Files (Summit, 2011)

=== As sideman ===
As: pianist (p), composer (c), arranger (a), orchestrator (o), producer (pr)

- Mikis Theodorakis, Canto General (1980; p)
- Sunrise Orchestra, Malata Suite (1986; p)
- Conexión Latina, Un Poco Loco (1986; p)
- Irazu, Mambo Inn (1991; p, c)
- Ray Barretto, Handprints (1991; p, c)
- Ray Barretto, Ancestral Messages (1992; p, c, a)
- Ray Barretto, Soy Dichoso (1992; p)
- Angelo Y su Tumbao Moderno, Extasis y Dolor (1993; p, c, a, pr)
- Ang Lee, Eat, Dream, Man, Woman (1994; p, a, pr)
- Ray Barretto, Taboo (1994; p, c, a)
- Lucia Pulido, Lucia (1995; p, a, pr)
- Ray Barretto, My Summertime (1995, p, c, a)
- Descarga Boricua, Abrázate (1996; p)
- Gabriela Anders, Fantasía (1996; p, a)
- Cruz Control, Cruz Control (1997; a)
- Paul Simon, The Capeman, the Cast Album (1997; p, a)
- Gabriela Anders, Wanting (1998; a)
- Luis Bonilla, Escucha (2000; p, c)
- Monday Michiru, 4 Seasons (2000; p)
- Don Byron, You are #6 (2001; p)
- Paul Peress, Awakening (2002; p, a)
- Gabriela Anders, Ecléctica (2003; p, a)
- Yerba Buena (band), President Alien, (2003, accordion)
- Gabriela Anders, Latina (2004; p, a)
- Vitaly Osmaçko, Russian Philharmonic Orchestra, Svetloba V ZIitu (2004; p, a, o)
- Julia Dollison, Observatory (2005, c)
- Samuel Torres, Skin Tones (2006, p, c)
- Gabriela Anders, Bossa Beleza (2008, p, a, pr)
- Willie Martinez y La Familia, After Winter, Spring (2008, a)
- Johnny Ray, El De La Rumba Soy Yo (2008, accordion)
- Eddie Allen, Salongo (2008; p)
- Chembo Corniel, Things I Wanted To Do (2009, a, c)
- Juan Garcia-Herreros ’Snow Owl’ The Art of The Contrabass Guitar (2010; p)
- Nelson Riveros, Camino al Barrio (2010; p, c, a, pr)
- Silvestre Martínez, Heritage (2010; p, a)
- Candido, Hands of Fire (2011; p)
- Birdland Big Band, Eleven (2011; p)
- Steffen Kuehn, Constantine (2011; p)
- Chicago (band) and New York Latin All Stars, Éxitos (2012; p)
- Roberto Santamaria, Fiesta al Jazz (2013; p, a)
- Juan Garcia-Herreros ’Snow Owl’ Normas (2013; p)
- Antonio Cuadros de Bejar, Color Americano (2014; p, a)
- Kotoe Suzuki, Kotoe (2017; p, pr)
