= Diego del Morao =

Romani flamenco guitarist

Diego del Morao (real name: Diego Moreno Jiménez; born 1978 in Jerez de la Frontera) is a Spanish Romani flamenco guitarist. He is the son of the late Moraíto Chico II who taught him guitar playing as well his attendance to El Carbonero's school. He has recorded live albums such as Confí de fuá, No hay quinto malo and La rosa blanca. He has performed with the likes of José Mercé, Vicente Soto Sordera, and Diego Carrasco.

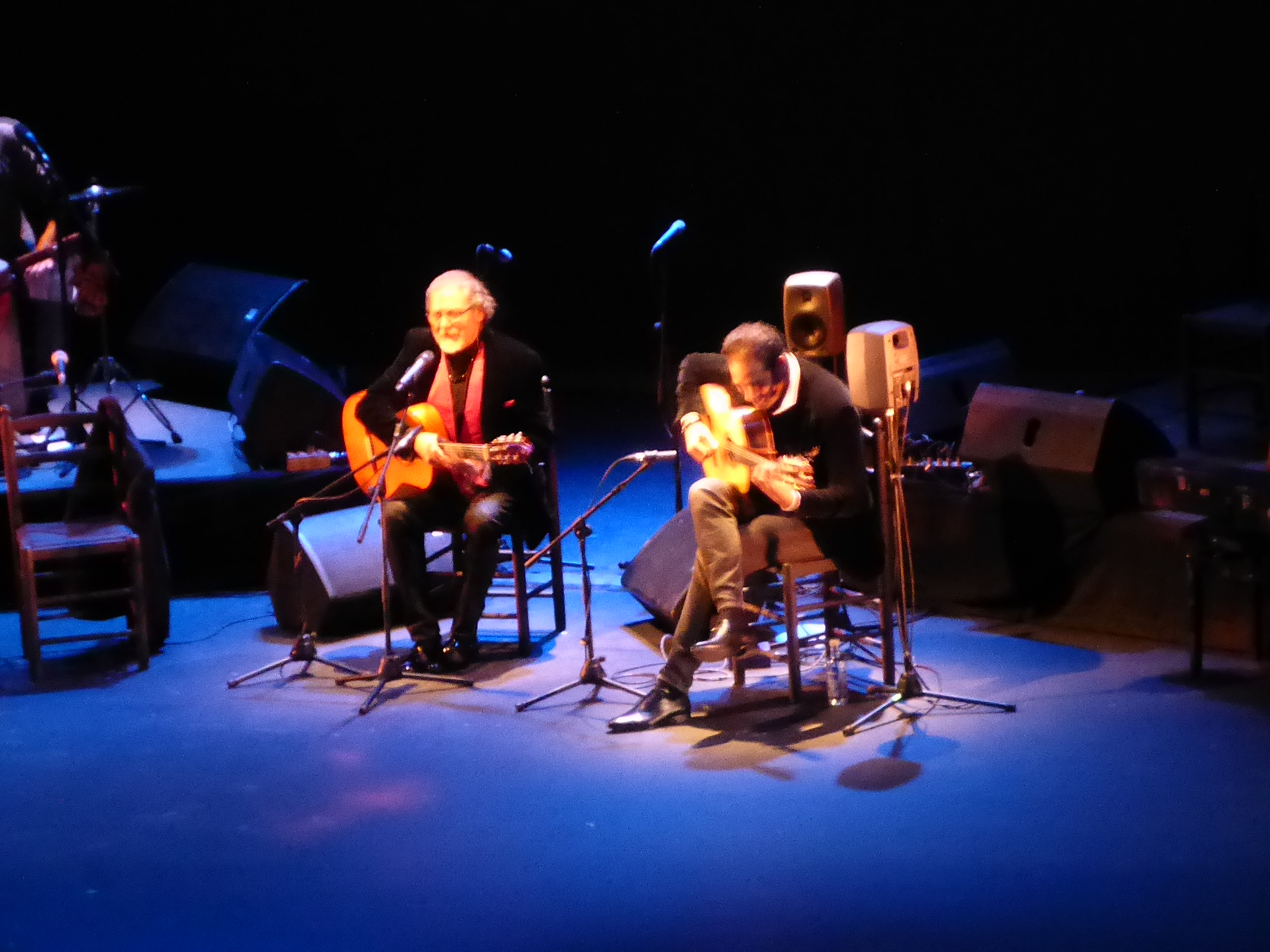
In concert with Diego Carrasco
