= Potito (singer) =

Spanish flamenco singer (born 1976)

El Potito (born Antonio Vargas Cortés in Seville in 1976) is a Spanish flamenco and new flamenco singer. He has been hailed as a "young singer tipped to be following in the footsteps of El Camaron." Bernard Leblon said he has a "prodigious voice capable of hitting incredibly high notes, [and] was an overnight sensation in the world of flamenco."

From a child at the age of 10, he began acting, singing and flamenco dancing on the tourist boats on the Guadalquivir River. As a teenager, he collaborated with acclaimed artists such as Paco de Lucía ("Zyryab"). By 1996 he had already released two albums with collaborations with Vicente Amigo and others. He has since performed in a large number of performances internationally, collaborating in performances of Joaquin Cortes and Sara Baras, and is a singer in the Tomatito group. Altogether he has released six albums, the last of which is Macandé.

== Discography ==
Contributing artist

- The Rough Guide to Flamenco (1997, World Music Network)
