= Javi Pamies =

Spanish footballer (born 2003)

Personal information
- Full name: Javier Pamies Marín
- Date of birth: 17 March 2003 (age 23)
- Place of birth: Elche, Spain
- Position: Centre back

Team information
- Current team: Valencia B
- Number: 5

Youth career
- 2010–2022: Elche

Senior career*
Years	Team	Apps	(Gls)
2021–2024	Elche B	54	(0)
2023–2024	Elche	2	(0)
2024–	Valencia B	5	(0)
- * Club domestic league appearances and goals as of 15 May 2026

Javier "Javi" Pamies Marín (born 17 March 2003) is a Spanish professional footballer who plays as a central defender for Valencia CF Mestalla.

== Career ==
Born in Elche, Alicante, Valencian Community, Pamies joined Elche CF's youth setup in 2010, aged seven. He made his senior debut with the reserves on 17 April 2021, starting in a 1–0 Tercera División away loss to Atlético Saguntino.

On 1 July 2022, already established in the B-team, Pamies renewed his contract with the Franjiverdes until 2024. He made his first team debut on 28 October 2023, coming on as a late substitute for Josan in a 2–1 Segunda División home win over CD Tenerife.

On 3 July 2024, Pamies moved to another reserve team, Valencia CF Mestalla in Segunda Federación.
