= Samuel Torres =

- Born: Samuel Torres; September 4, 1976 (age 50); Colombia
- Origin: Bogotá, Colombia
- Genre: Latin Jazz
- Occupations: percussionist, composer, arranger
- Instruments: Maracas, Congas, Cajon
- Years active: 1999 – present
- Labels: One Soul, Indie
- Website: www.samueltorres.com

Samuel Torres (born September 4, 1976) is a Colombian percussionist composer and arranger. He was born in Bogotá, and started playing at age twelve and became involved with different bands in his hometown. Torres' musician credits includes collaboration for 2013 Latin Grammy nominated Alejandro Sanz "La Música No Se Toca" (2013). Although, he received classical training, Torres was intrigued by the different styles and rhythms of the Latinamerican and jazz sounds. He graduated from the University of Javeriana in Music Composition.

In 1999, Grammy Award winner Arturo Sandoval contracted Torres and toured with him for four years. In 2000, Samuel Torres received the second place at the 2000 Thelonious Monk International Jazz Competition for Hand Percussion.

Throughout his career as a percussionist, Torres has performed with jazz artist Tito Puente, Chick Corea, Poncho Sanchez, Pete Escovedo, Dave Valentine, Michael Brecker, Don Byron, Claudio Roditi, Paquito D’Rivera, Caribbean Jazz Project, Jeff "Tain" Watts, Lila Downs, Candido Camero and Mike Stern among other great musicians.

Many of his performances include his participation in the Florida International University big band, the 5 de Mayo Celebration 2001 with Nashville Symphony, the Hollywood Bowl Latin Festival 2001 with the L.A. Philharmonic, 2001 Newport Jazz Festival in Madarao, Japan and many more.

== Discography ==
=== As leader ===
- Skin Tones (One Soul, 2005)
- “Yaoundé” (Blue Conga Music, 2010)
- “ Forced Displacement” (Zoho, 2015)
- “Regreso” Samuel Torres y La Nueva Filarmonia (2019) - Latin Grammy Award Winner for Best Classical Album
- “Alegria” ( Blue Conga Music, 2019)
- “A Dance for Birds” (Blue Conga Music, 2024

=== As sideman ===
- Marc Anthony, Amar Sin Mentiras (Columbia/Sony 2004)
- Richard Bona, Bona Makes You Sweat: Live (Decca 2008)
- Jamie Baum, In This Life (Sunnyside 2013)
- Antonio Carmona, De Noche (Universal 2011)
- Edmar Castaneda, Entre Cuerdas (Artistshare 2009)
- Chenoa, Desafiando La Gravedad (Vale/Universal 2010)
- The Chieftains, San Patricio (Hear Music 2010)
- Lila Downs, Lila Downs Y La Misteriosa en Paris (World Village 2010)
- Allan Harris, Black Bar Jukebox (Love 2015)
- Hector Martignon, Second Chance (Zoho, 2010)
- Hector Martignon, The Big Band Theory (Zoho, 2016)
- Ricky Martin, A Quien Quiera Escuchar (Sony 2015)
- Arturo O'Farrill, The Offense of the Drum (Motema 2014)
- Arturo Sandoval, My Passion for the Piano (Crescent Moon/Columbia 2002)
- Alejandro Sanz, #ElDisco (Universal 2019)
- Helen Sung, Sung Without Words (Stricker Street 2018)
- Thalia, Thalia (Virgin 2003)
- Diego Torres, Buena Vida (Sony 2015)
- Jack Wilkins, Until It's Time (Maxjazz 2009)

== DVD ==
"Drums Solo Revisited" (2004)
