= Manuel Agujetas =

Spanish flamenco singer (1933–2015)

Manuel de los Santos Pastor, also known as El Agujetas or el El Agujeta, (17 May 1939 – 25 December 2015) was a flamenco singer.

== Biography ==
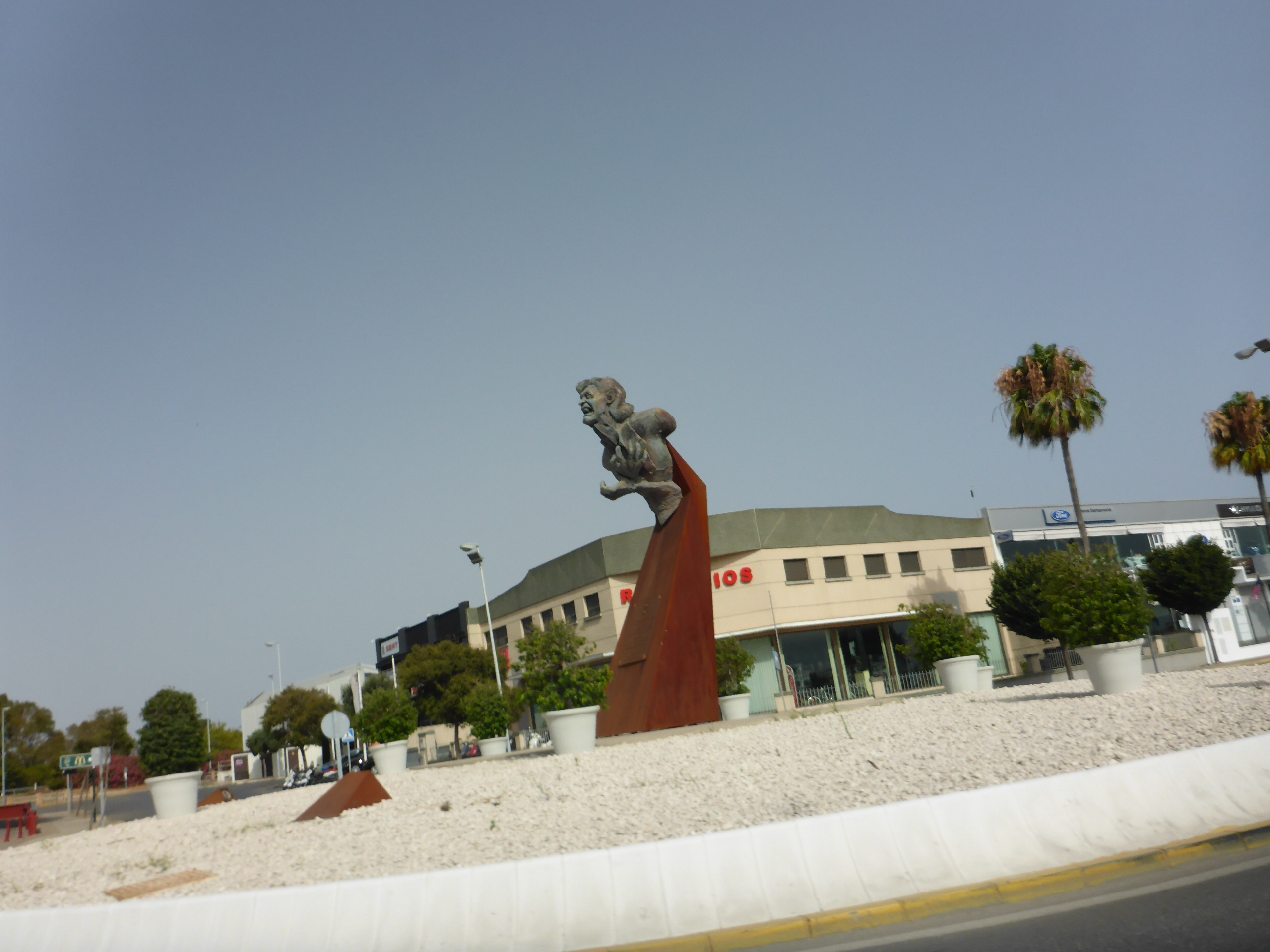
Monument

He was born in Rota, Spain to singer Agujetas el Viejo. Both father and son follow the school of Manuel Torre, representative of the tradition of Jerez, and father of singers Dolores Agujetas and Antonio Agujetas. He worked in his father's forge until he went to work in Madrid as a teenager. He took part in the recording of the Magna Antología del Cante, compiled by Blas Vega. He appeared singing a martinete in Carlos Saura's film Flamenco (1995) and in Dominique Abel's documentary Agujetas.Cantaor.

Agujetas was known for his unique and sometimes eccentric personality, his insistence on living a simple life despite his status as a revered flamenco artist, his metal teeth, and his deep, intense and affecting singing.

== Partial discography ==
1. Viejo cante jondo (1972)
2. Premio Manuel Torre de Canta Flamenco (1974)
3. Raíces (1976)
4. Palabra viva (1977)
5. El color de la hierba (1978)
6. Gualberto y Agujetas (1979)
7. Grandes Cantaores de flamenco: Agujetas (1986)
8. En París (1990)
9. El Querer no se puede ocultar (1998)
10. En la soleá (1998)
11. Agujetas cantaor (1999)
12. 24 quilates (2002)
13. Tres Generaciones (2002)
14. El rey del cante gitano (2003)
15. Archivo de flamenco: el Agujetas
16. Agujetas: Historia, Pureza y Vanguardia Del Flamenco (2012, five cd's anthology)

== Sources ==
- ÁLVAREZ CABALLERO, Ángel: La Discografía ideal del cante flamenco, Planeta, Barcelona, 1995. ISBN 84-08-01602-4
- GRIMALDOS, Alfredo: Historia social del flamenco, 2010.
