= Moraíto Chico II =

Flamenco guitarist

Moraíto Chico
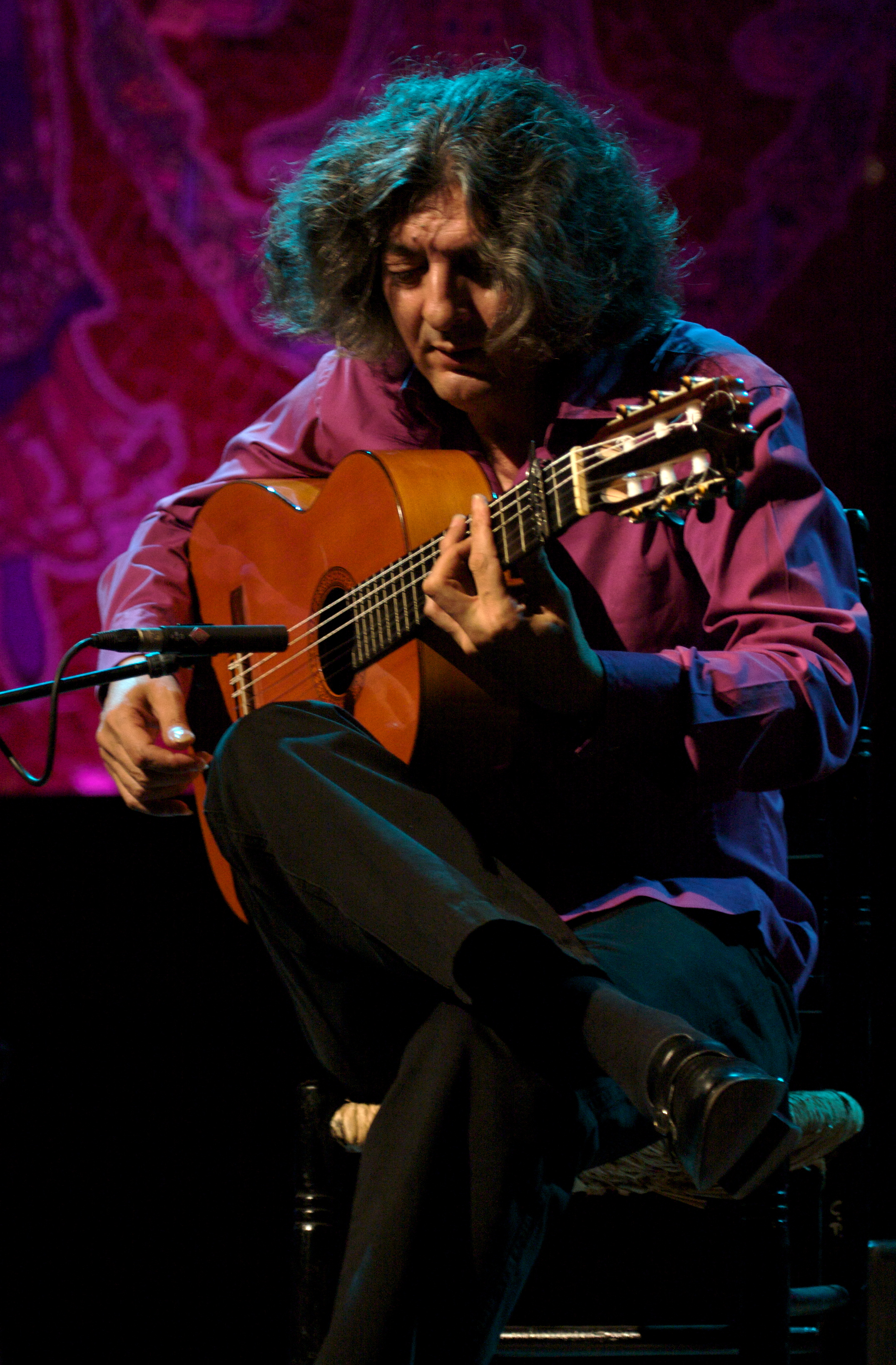
- Born: Manuel Moreno Junquera; 13 September 1956; Jerez de la Frontera, Cádiz, Spain
- Died: 10 August 2011 (aged 54); Jerez de la Frontera, Spain

Moraíto Chico (born Manuel Moreno Junquera; 13 September 1956 – 10 August 2011) was a Flamenco guitarist.

He was known as one of the best and most in-demand accompanying guitarists of his generation, and regularly accompanied José Mercé, Diego Carrasco and other popular flamenco singers. He also performed often with such stars as La Paquera de Jerez, Camarón de la Isla and Manuel Agujetas. Moraito was particularly renowned for his powerful, full, and round sound, his driving rhythmic style and impressive rasgueos. He was one of the finest exponents of the buleria form and can be seen and heard playing in this style on Carlos Saura's influential 'Flamenco' and "Flamenco, Flamenco' films.

Moraito was the nephew of the original Moraíto (Manuel Moreno a.k.a. Manuel Morao), and the son of the original Moraíto Chico (Juan Moreno). His son, Diego Del Morao, is one of the best known of the current generation of Flamenco guitarists.

He died on 10 August 2011, after a long struggle with cancer.

== Works ==
He has recorded two solo albums:

- "Morao, Morao"
- "Morao y Oro"

Moraito also participated in an instructional video and scores booklet (now published as a DVD) with Encuentro Publications, which included in the first part of the video / DVD five selected pieces from his repertoire: two Bulerías, Sevillanas, Tangos and Vals-Bulerías. The second part was devoted to Moraíto's speciality: together with singer Fernando Terremoto (also deceased), Moraíto focused on basic principles and difficulties of the accompaniment of cante using Malagueñas, Seguiriyas and Tientos/Tangos.
