= Tablao =

Flamenco music venue

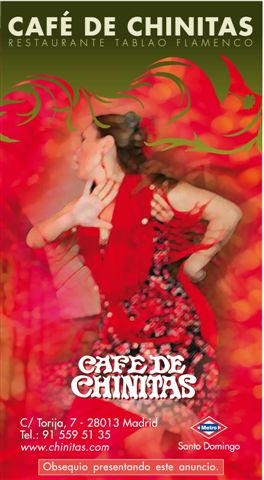
Advertisement of the tablao Café de Chinitas, Madrid.

A tablao (colloquial term for the Spanish "tablado", floorboard) is a place where flamenco shows are performed and also tablao is the term used for the platform floor on which a flamenco dancer dances. Tablao venues were developed during the 1960s throughout Spain replacing the cafés cantantes (cabarets).

== About ==
Tablao are mostly found in Andalusia, often along the coast or in larger cities. In Granada, the Sacromonte caves or "gypsy flamenco caves" (zambras) are located along Cuesta de Chapiz.

Tablaos tend to be decorated in a typically Spanish way with embroidered silk shawls, photographs of famous people, bullfighting clothes and capes. At a tablao they often serve drinks, they may offer samples of tapas, or dining on a full Spanish meal. The pricing structure of a tablao can be confusing and expensive, this varies by location and can be depending on if there is an entrance fee.

== Earlier history and café cantantes ==
The first "cafe cantantes" was named Café sin Nobre (No Name Cafe) and was opened in 1842 in Seville, Spain by flamenco singer Silvio Franconetti. These cafes were night bars with flamenco entertainment, and where in addition to serving drinks, offered performances of singing, playing and dancing. It was from the creation of these cafe cantantes bars that flamenco became more popular and the emergence of the professional flamenco performer.

The cafés cantantes peaked from mid-19th century and well into the second decade of the 20th century, however there was decline of "pure flamenco" style. With increased popularity, flamenco spread to other regions and the entertainment venue structure changed with it and new styles of flamenco developed. The "cafés cantantes" used to have a consistent decorative style: walls decorated with bullfighting posters and mirrors in a large room with tables, and at the back which was the tablao where artists offer their shows.
