= Joan Albert Amargós =

Spanish composer and conductor (born 1950)

Joan Albert Amargós is a Spanish composer and conductor born in Barcelona in 1950. Amargós is an instrumentalist on piano and clarinet, and has composed a number of chamber and symphonic works. He is also a great connoisseur of Flamenco, which has served as the basis for some of his compositions, which always breathe a brightness and colour distinctly Mediterranean.

He has earned a number of prizes, such as the prize for best arranger of Spain. The government of Catalonia awarded him the National Award for music for the opera Euridice in 2002. He also won the Ciudad de Barcelona Prize the same year, for his collaborations with Miguel Poveda. In 2008 his composition Northern Concerto was nominated for a Grammy in the category of Best Classical Contemporary Composition; Michala Petri was the soloist on recorder. He also collaborated with Flamenco legends Paco de Lucía and Camarón de la Isla

== Filmography ==
He has composed the soundtracks of several motion pictures.

- 2005 : J'ai vu tuer Ben Barka
