= Miguel Poveda =

Spanish flamenco singer

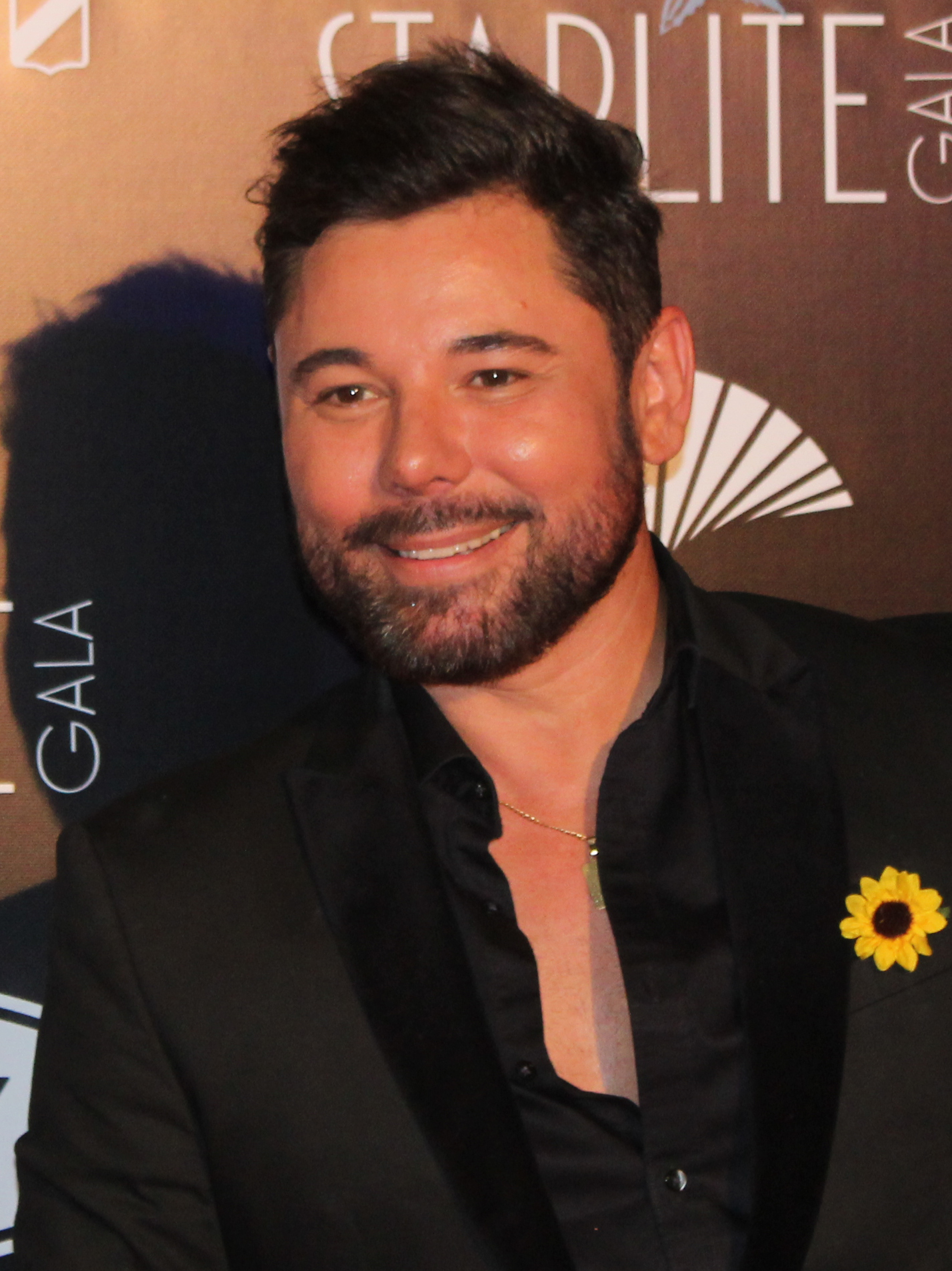
- Poveda at the Starlite Gala in 2019

Background information
- Birth name: Miguel Ángel Poveda León
- Born: 13 February 1973 (age 52); Barcelona, Spain
- Genres: Flamenco
- Occupation: Singer
- Website: www.miguelpoveda.com

Miguel Ángel Poveda León (born 13 February 1973) is a Spanish flamenco singer.

Poveda has collaborated with artists from various disciplines who were previously unknown to flamenco audiences. He often collaborates with Spanish flamenco guitarist Juan Gómez "Chicuelo", with whom he has toured extensively in Europe, Japan and the US.

== Early life ==
Poveda was born in Barcelona, Catalonia, to a father from Lorca, Murcia, and a mother from Puertollano, Castilla-La Mancha. In 2003, he moved to Seville.

== Discography ==
- Suena Flamenco (1998)
- Zaguán (2001)
- Desglaç (2005)
- Tierra de Calma (2006), with Juan Carlos Romero
- Coplas del Querer (2009), with Joan Albert Amargós & Chicuelo
- Cante i Orquestra (2009), with Joan Albert Amargós & Chicuelo
- Coplas del Querer, Live from El Gran Teatro de Liceu (2010)
- Viento del Este (2010)
- arteSano (2012)
- Real (2012)
- Diálogos de Buenos Aires a Granada (2013), with Rodolfo Mederos
- Enlorquecido (2018)
- Diverso (2021)
