= Rubem Dantas =

Brazilian jazz musician

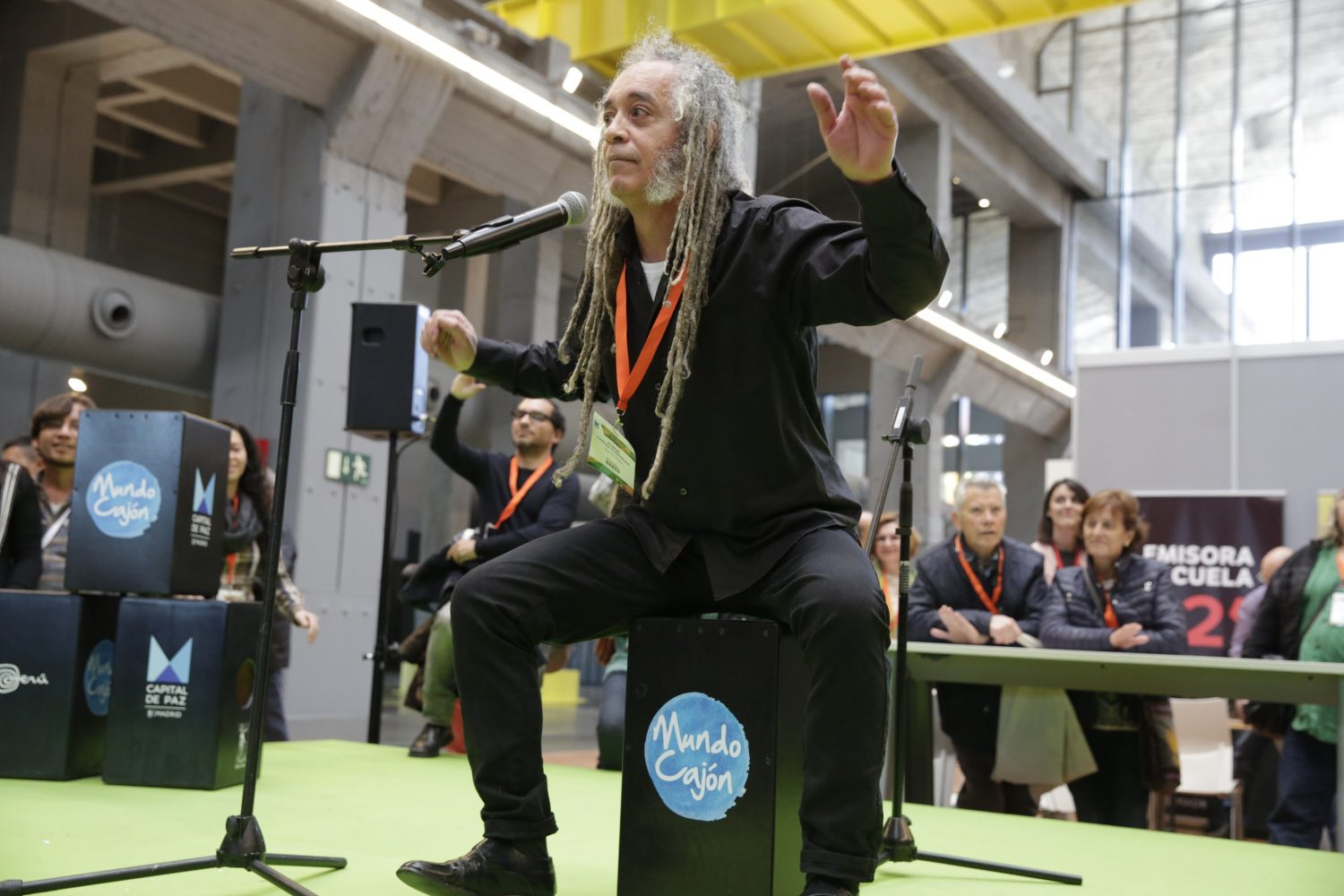
Rubem Dantas in Madrid, Spain in 2017.

Rubem Dantas (born Salvador, Bahia, 1954) is a Brazilian jazz fusion percussionist.

He is noted for his work with Camarón de la Isla, Paco de Lucía, Ramón de Algeciras, Chick Corea, Pepe de Lucía (he was part of the Paco de Lucía Sextet which formed in 1981), Carles Benavent, George Brown, Juan Ramirez, Manolito Soler, Joaquín Grilo, Duquende, Rafael de Utrera, Juan Manuel Cañizares, Viejín and José María Bandera.
