= Diego Carrasco =

Spanish guitarist and composer

Diego Carrasco Fernández (born in 1954 in Jerez de la Frontera, Spain) is a Spanish flamenco guitar player, composer and singer (cantaor).

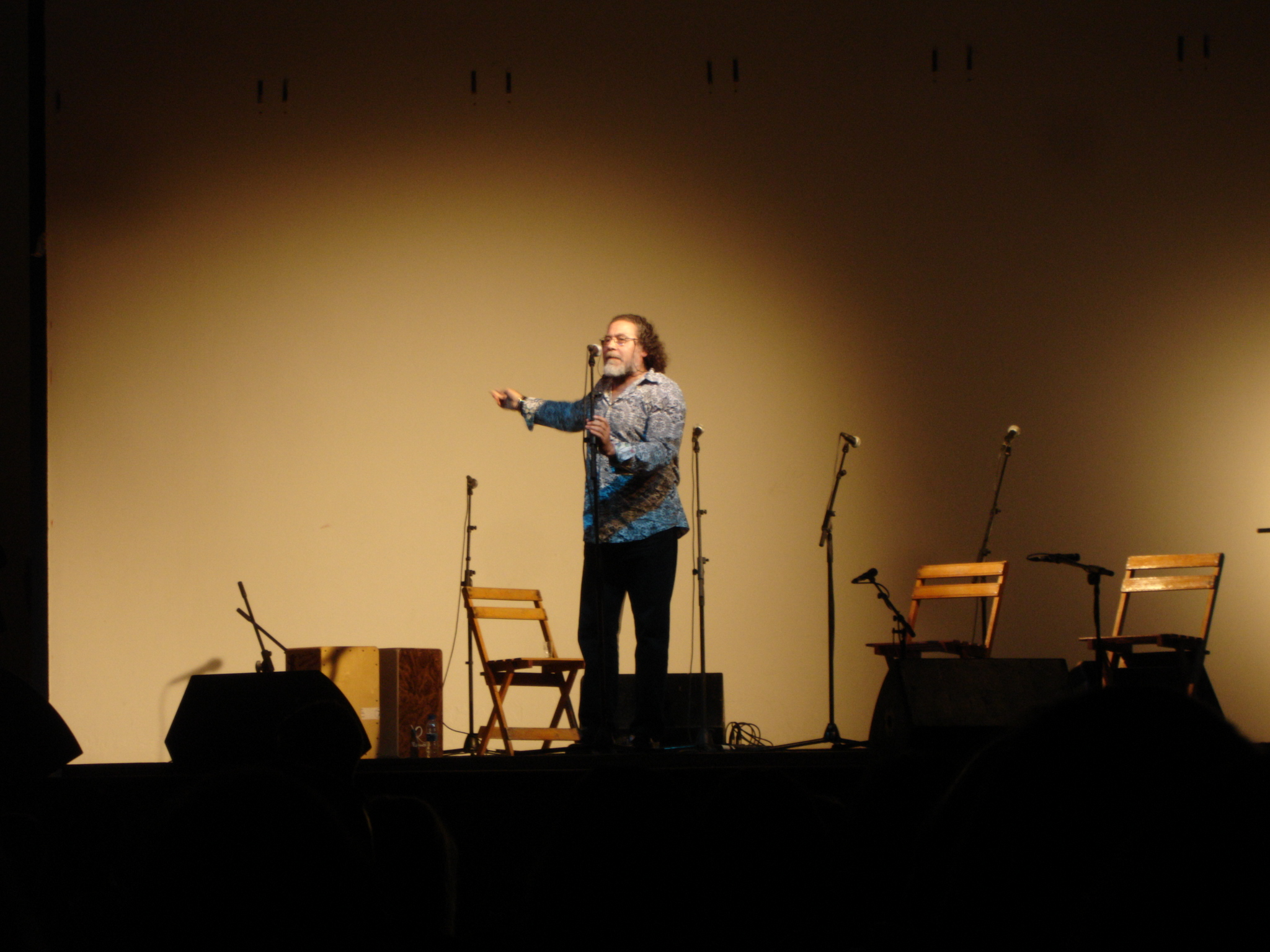
Diego introducing an artist in a show.

== Biography ==
He started at the age of 13 years old as "Tate de Jerez", playing guitar to artists like Ana la Piriñaca, tío Gregorio Borrico, Terremoto de Jerez, Manolo Soler or Sernita de Jerez; and to dancers like Alejandro Vega y Antonio Gades.

In 1984 his first album as singer is recorded, and he start a personal way to understand flamenco fusion with other musics.

== Albums ==
- Cantes y sueños (RCA, 1984)
- Tomaquetoma (RCA, 1987)
- Voz de referencia (Nuevos Medios, 1993)
- A tiempo (Nuevos Medios, 1994)
- Inquilino del Mundo (Nuevos Medios, 2000)
- Mi ADN flamenco (Nuevos Medios, 2004)
- Hippytano (2012)
- No marrecojo (2017)

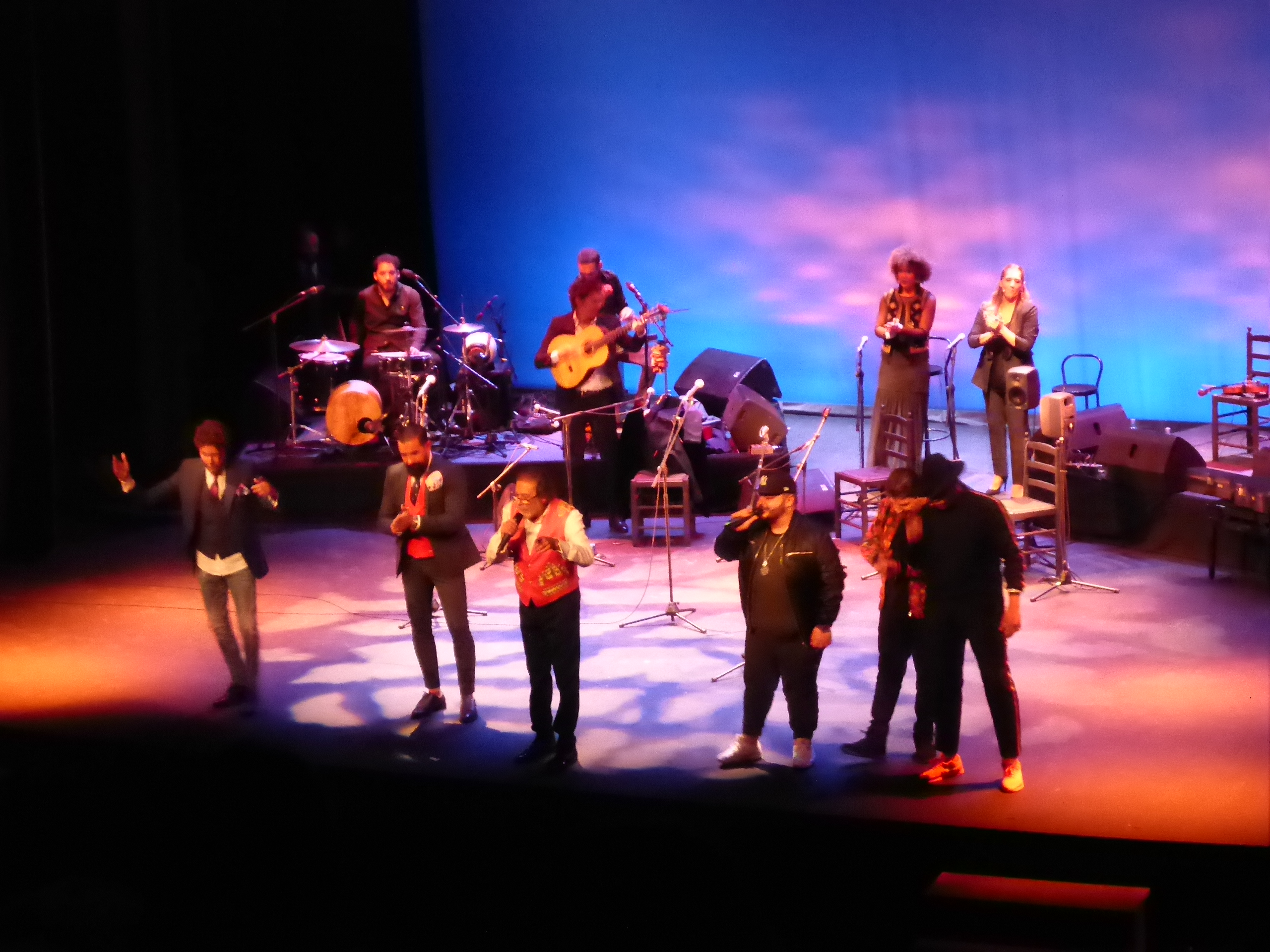
Performing live
