= Carles Benavent =

Catalan flamenco and jazz bass player

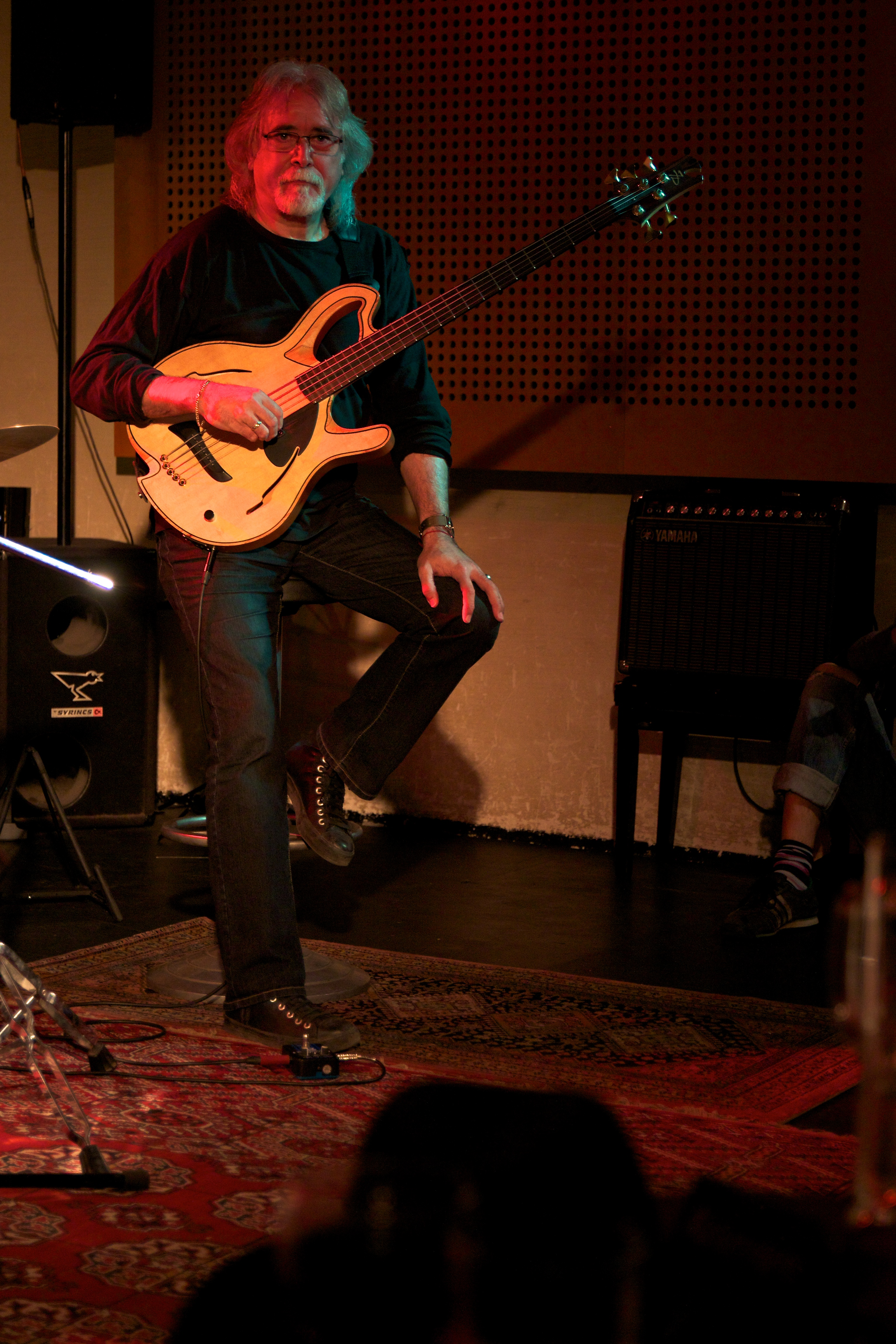
- Benavent in Berlin, 2012

Background information
- Born: March 1, 1954 (age 72); Barcelona, Spain
- Genres: Flamenco, jazz, progressive rock, pop/rock
- Instrument: Bass guitar

Carles Benavent (born 1 March 1954) is a Catalan flamenco and jazz bass player.

== Biography ==
Benavent was born in the Poble Sec neighborhood in Barcelona. He started playing the bass when he was thirteen years old, attracted by blues and rock, Jimi Hendrix in particular. A totally self-taught jazz bassist, he founded the group, "Música Urbana" with which he recorded two albums. He came to create a new form of playing the electric bass "Flamenco style", using the pick to create a special type of alzapúa (style of plucking the strings with the finger and pick). His preferred instrument is the fretless bass, which was pretty uncommon at the time, so he can be considered one of the fretless bass pioneers in Flamenco music. One of the hallmark pieces that first showcased his unique playing was his duet with Paco de Lucia on Paco's album Solo Quiero Caminar, called "Monasterio De Sal" (Colombiana). On the same album, his use of harmonics and his groove playing on the track "Chanela" (Rumba) are reminiscent of the great jazz bassist Jaco Pastorius.

He is one of the musicians that is sought out by Chick Corea, Miles Davis and Paco de Lucía, and with the last he recorded "Paco de Lucía interpreta a Manuel de Falla". Since then the interaction between the two musicians has been consistent and fruitful, having played together for 25 years.

=== Injury ===
In 1995 he suffered a severe accident which injured his left arm, causing Benavent to rethink his future as a musician, but he recovered well. After appearing in the Jazz Festival of Getxo he started the recording of the album Fénix. His career is marked by collaborations inside and outside the world of flamenco. With his playing style, intuition, rhythm and musicality, he continues to be in demand for live performances and recording sessions.

== Equipment ==
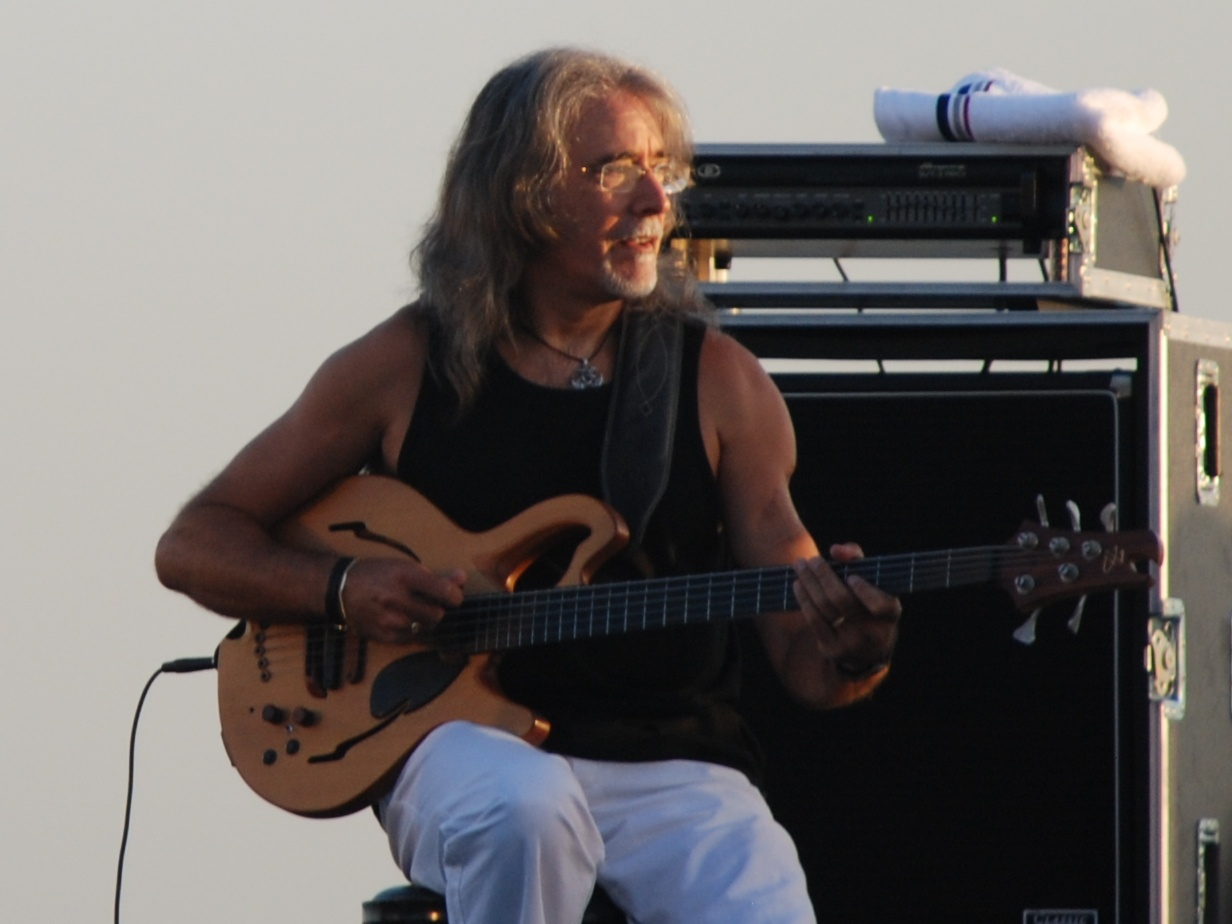
Carles Benavent in August 2007

Carles Benavent plays Jerzy Drozd custom "Barcelona" 4-string and 5-string basses, the latter with a high C string rather than a standard low B. This tuning overlaps with the range of the guitar, allowing for chordal playing in addition to bass.

== Discography ==
- Màquina! - En Directo (1972)
- Música Urbana - Música Urbana (1976)
- Música Urbana - Iberia (1978)
- Paco de Lucía Sextet - Sólo quiero caminar (1981)
- Chick Corea - Touchstone (1982)
- Chick Corea - Again and Again (1983)
- Camarón de la Isla - Calle Real (1983)
- Camarón de la Isla - Viviré (1984)
- Paco de Lucía Sextet - Live... One Summer Night (1984)
- Camarón de la Isla - Soy Gitano (1989)
- Carmen Linares - La luna en el río (1991)
- Camarón de la Isla - Potro de Rabia y Miel (1992)
- Paco de Lucía Sextet - Live in América (1993)
- Diego Carrasco - Voz de referencia (1993)
- Nguyên Lê - Bakida (2000)
- Carles Benavent & Josemi Carmona - Sumando (2006)
- Chick Corea - The Ultimate Adventure (2006)
- Quartet (2009, bebyne records)
- Un, Dos, Tres... (2011, bebyne records)
- Iñaki Sandoval - Electric Trio Live (bebyne records, 2015)
