= Jorge Pardo (musician) =

Spanish flautist and saxophonist

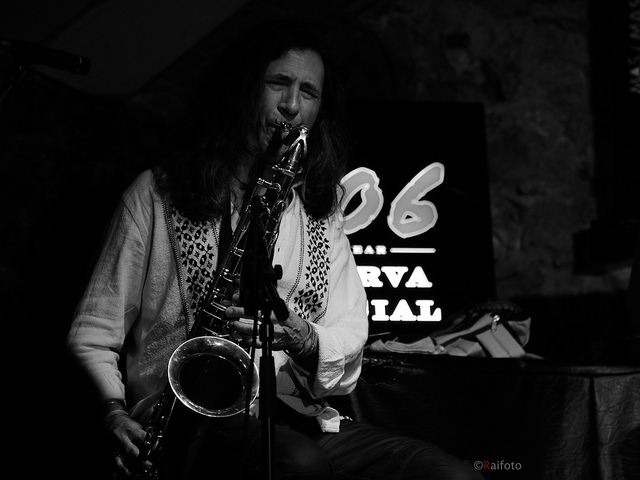
Jorge Pardo in 2013

Jorge Pardo is a Spanish flautist and saxophonist born 1 December 1956 in Madrid, known for the albums he released for Milestone Records in the 1990s. He has been a side musician of famous flamenco guitarist Paco de Lucia and also with American jazz legend Chick Corea. He occasionally joins the Al andalus ensemble for performances.

== Discography ==
Albums

- 1982: Jorge Pardo (Blau)
- 1984: El canto de los Guerreros (Linterna)
- 1991: In a Minute (Milestone)
- 1991: Las cigarras son quizá sordas (Milestone)
- 1993: Veloz hacia su sino (Milestone)
- 1995: 10 de Paco (Milestone) (with Chano Dominguez)
- 1997: 2332 (Nuevos Medios)
- 2001: Mira (Nuevos Medios)
- 2005: Vientos Flamencos (Manantial de Músicas)
- 2009: Vientos Flamencos 2 (Flamenco World Music)
- 2012: Huellas
- 2013: Puerta del Sol
- 2014: Historias De Radha Y Krishna
- 2016: Djinn
- 2020: Brooklyn Sessions (with Gil Goldstein)

Contributing artist

- 1997: The Rough Guide to Flamenco (World Music Network)
- 1997: Ur (Al Sur) with Michel Bismut, Keyvan Chemirani, Nabil Khalidi
- 2006: The Ultimate Adventure (Chick Corea album)
- 2019: Antidote (Chick Corea album)
