= Fados (film) =

- Directed by: Carlos Saura
- Written by: Carlos Saura; Ivan Dias
- Produced by: Ivan Dias; Luis Galvao Teles; Antonio Saura; Leslie Calvo
- Starring: Mariza; Camane; Carlos Do Carmo; Cuca Roseta; Catarina Moura; Lila Downs
- Cinematography: Jose Luis Lopez-Linares; Eduardo Serra
- Edited by: Julia Juaniz
- Music by: Carlos do Carmo
- Production companies: Fado Filmes; Duvideo; Zebra Producciones; Ventas Internacionales; Latido Films
- Distributed by: Zeitgeist Films
- Release dates: 6 September 2007 (Toronto International Film Festival); 4 October 2007 (Portugal)
- Running time: 88 minutes
- Country: Portugal
- Language: Portuguese

Fados is a 2007 Portuguese film directed by Carlos Saura. The film, a fusion of cinema, song, dance and instrumental numbers, explores Portugal's most emblematic musical genre, fado, and its spirit of saudade (melancholy).

Under the musical supervision of Carlos do Carmo, Fados completed Saura's musical trilogy form with Flamenco (1995) and Tango (1998). Saura deploys mirrors, back projections, lighting effects, and lush colors to frame each song.

Fados contains homages to Maria Severa, Alfredo Marceneiro, and Amália Rodrigues, as well as turns by modern stars like Mariza and Camané. Saura expands the songs (which traditionally involve just a singer and a guitarist) with dance and encompasses other nationalities of Portugal's former colonies and idioms (such as hip hop, flamenco and reggae).

== Soundtrack ==
The soundtrack for the film includes several songs that were included in the film:

- "Fado da Saudade" - Carlos do Carmo
- "Kola San Jon" - Kola San Jon
- "Variações em Lá" - Jaime Santos, Ricardo Rocha
- "Transparente" - Mariza
- "Menina Você que Tem" - Toni Garrido
- "Quadras" - Camané
- "Fado da Severa" - Catarina Moura
- "Rua do Capelão" - Cuca Roseta
- "Marceneiro" - SP & Wilson
- "Um Homem na Cidade" - Carlos do Carmo
- "Foi na Travessa da Palha" - Lila Downs
- "Vida Vivida" - Argentina Santos
- "Fado Batido" - Brigada Victor Jara
- "Flor Di Nha Esperança" - Lura
- "Sopra Demais o Vento" - Camané
- "Estranha Forma de Vida" - Caetano Veloso
- "Fado Tropical" ("Tropical Fado") - Chico Buarque e Carlos do Carmo
- "Meu Fado Meu" - Mariza and Miguel Poveda
- "Casa de Fados" - Maria da Nazaré and Vicente da Câmara
- "Ó Gente da Minha Terra" - Mariza

== Reception ==
On review aggregator website Rotten Tomatoes, the film holds an approval rating of 96% based on 26 reviews, with an average rating of 7.6/10.
