= Leslie Calvo =

Spanish film producer and director

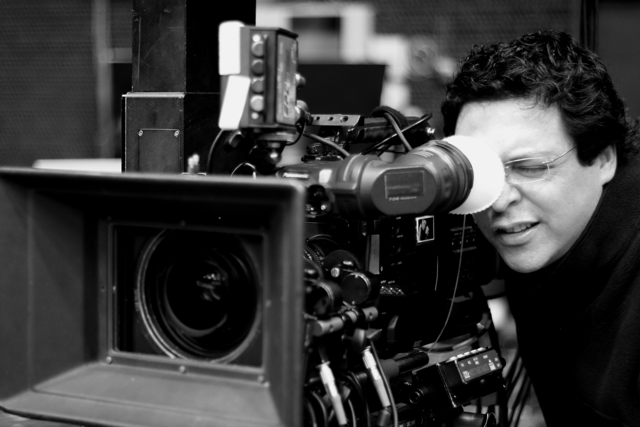
- Born: Leslie Calvo Grijalba; San José, Costa Rica
- Occupations: Film producer, director, actor
- Years active: 1998 - present

Leslie Calvo (born in San José, Costa Rica) is a Spanish film producer and director. He was an executive producer of musical films by Spanish director Carlos Saura.

== Education ==
Calvo began his drama education in Costa Rica, where he acted in the National Theater Company. In 1991, he moved to Spain.

Calvo graduated Business Telecom (UPC/Telefónica) at Media Business School (MBS), mastering in Audiovisual Management, and in Audiovisual Production at the School of Radio Televisión Española (RTVE).

== Film production ==
In 1998, Calvo was assistant director and executive producer of A Perfect Day, directed by Jacobo Rispa (Goya Prize 2000), and produced other short films such as Acelera and Aguilar Soria, a documentary on the work of painter Alejandro Aguilar Soria.

Calvo began feature film work in 2002, with Chueca: buscando una identidad, directed by Juana Macías, Iruya la magia del títere by Damián Ainstein (Fike Prize 2002 Évora – Portugal) and Di que sí by Juan Calvo. He also helped make Teresa: el cuerpo de Cristo by Ray Loriga,¿Y tú quién eres? by Antonio Mercero and the TV series Mi gemela es hija única.

Calvo worked on the last musical productions and documentaries of director Carlos Saura, including Fados (2007- Luso Spanish Prize of Art and Culture), Symphony of Aragon (2008 - Best Audiovisual Award Zaragoza Universal Exhibition) and Flamenco, Flamenco (2009), as a production manager.

In 2010, Calvo founded Tresmonstruos Media and produced Vivir de negro by Alejo Flah, Los B de M de Rosa Maroto (Best Short Film Moratalaz Film Festival) and the documentaries Sin Ruido, Zarzuela en Femenino and Zarzuela en Masculino.

In 2016, Calvo produced J: Beyond Flamenco by Carlos Saura, a musical and dance documentary featuring musicians Ara Malikian, Juan Manuel Cañizares and Carlos Núñez, as well as dancers Sara Baras and Miguel Ángel Berna.
