= Cuca Roseta (album) =

Studio album by Cuca Roseta
- Released: 2011
- Genre: Fado
- Labels: Surco, Universal Music Portugal

Cuca Roseta chronology
Cuca Roseta (2011)	Raiz (2013)

Cuca Roseta is the first album released by fado singer Cuca Roseta. It was released in 2011 by Surco and Universal Music Portugal.

== Track listing ==
1. Porque Voltas De Que Lei
2. Homem Português
3. Quem És Tu Afinal
4. Nos Teus Braços
5. Lisboa A Namorar
6. Maré Viva
7. Tortura
8. Marcha De Santo António
9. Saudades Do Brasil Em Portugal
10. Rua Do Capelão
11. Avé-Maria Fadista
