= Falete =

Spanish singer

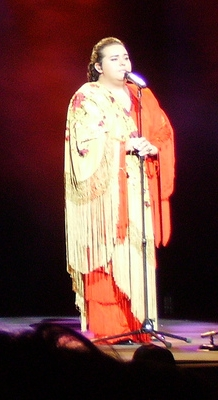
- Born: Rafael Ojeda Rojas; January 9, 1978 (age 48); Seville, Spain
- Occupation: Flamenco singer

Rafael Ojeda Rojas (born 1978 in Seville), better known as Falete (Spanish pronunciation: [faˈlete]), is a Spanish flamenco singer.

== Biography ==
Falete's father was a founding member of the musical group Cantores de Híspalis. At the age of 17, he made his debut at the Teatro Lope de Vega, Seville, where he sang for La Chunga. In the mid-90s, he traveled around the United States, singing alongside Juanito Valderrama, José Menese and José Manuel Soto.

In 1997, Falete starred in the anthology Novísimos, huele a flamenco. He traveled to Japan in 2002 with La Paquera de Jerez to tour theaters until 2004, when he released his debut album Amar duele, which rendered him a national musical and media figure. It was a compilation of covers of some of his favorite songs. The album won a Disco de Oro and was on the list of bestselling albums for over 10 months.

== Discography ==
- Amar duele (2004)
- Puta mentira (2006)
- Coplas que nos han matao (2007)
- ¿Quién te crees tú? (2008)
- Sin censura (2012)
