= Daniel Casares =

Spanish flamenco guitarist and composer

- Born: 1980 (age 45–46); Estepona, Málaga Spain
- Genre: Flamenco music
- Occupations: Composer; Guitarist
- Instrument: Guitar
- Website: danielcasares.es

Daniel Casares (born 1980) is a Spanish flamenco guitarist and composer. He has recorded six solo albums, such as Duende flamenco (1999), La Madrugá (2001), Corazón de tu alma (2004), Caballero (2007), El Ladrón del Agua (2010) and Picassares (2015).

== Early life ==
Daniel Casares was born in 1980 in Estepona, Málaga.

== Career ==
He started his music career by participating in the project A la Guitarra de Estepona, a recording on which he appeared along with other artists. Daniel Casares produced his first solo CD, Duende Flamenco in 1999, followed by La Madruga (2001) and Corazón de tu alma (2004). He released his fourth solo album, Caballero (2007), which was recorded in Málaga, Spain and has collaborations with Pitingo and El Güito.

In 2010, Daniel Casares was the only artist chosen to represent European culture at the media launch gala at Expo 2010, held in Shanghai, China.

In 2014, Casares released his album, La Luna de Alejandra (2014), which includes his version of "El concierto de Aranjuez", by Joaquín Rodrigo, and his first symphonic composition, "La Luna de Alejandra", dedicated to his daughter. Daniel Casares has recorded with the Philharmonic Orchestra, directed by Arturo Diez Boscovich, who has also collaborated in "La Luna de Alejandra", together with José Miguel Ébora.

He has collaborated with artists such as Alejandro Sanz, Antonio Orozco, José Mercé, Dulce Pontes, Pasión Vega, Toquinho, Chucho Valdés, Lulo Pérez and Miguel Poveda. He also composed music for the 2010 Spanish film El Discípulo, by Universal Pictures.

== Discography ==
=== CD's and albums ===
Year	Album(s)	Artist(s)	Label(s)
1999	Duende Flamenco	Daniel Casares	Antequera Records, Cambaya
2000	A la Guitarra, Estepona	Daniel Casares, Francisco Javier Jimeno, Jose A. Fernandez	Cambaya
2001	La Madruga	Daniel Casares	
2001	Cante de las Minas 1996 – 2000	Antonio Fuentes Melero, Carlos Piñana, Curro Piñana, Daniel Casares, Gabriel Expósito, Miguel Ortega, Paco Javier Jimeno, Paco del Pozo, Rafael Calderon, Rocío Segura, Rosendo Fernandez, Ruben Diaz Levaniegos, Salvador Salas "El Potro"	Karonte / Cambaya
2004	Corazón de tu alma	Daniel Casares	DMD Productions
2007	Caballero	Daniel Casares	Universal Music Group
2010	El Ladrón del Agua	Daniel Casares, Dulce Pontes, Miguel Poveda	Lola Records Music Company
2010	La Madrugá (Nuevo Flamenco)	Daniel Casares	Fods / Meta
2012	Pa Saber De ... (Remastered 2012)	Adela La Jaqueta, Antonio Arenas, Antonio Carbonell, Antonio Mairena, Bombino, Camarón de la Isla, Carmen Linares, Chano Lobato, Curro de Utrera, Daniel Casares, David Cerreduela, Diego Castellon, Dolores Vargas, El Bandolero, El Indio Gitano, El Niño Miguel, Enrique Morente, Enrique de Melchor, Eri Esittajia, Fernando Soto, Fosforito, Juan Jose Suarez, Josemi Carmona, José Mercé, Juan Habichuela, Juan Manuel Cañizares, Juan Peña, Juan Serrano, La Paquera de Jerez, La Perrata, Manolo Caracol, Manolo Sanlúcar, Manuel Moreno Penella, Melchor de Marchena, Moraíto Chico, Multi Interpretes, Paco de Lucía, Pedro Peña, Pepe Habichuela, Pepe Sánchez, Pepe de Lucía, Pericón de Cádiz, Pitingo, Ramón de Algeciras, Rosario La Mejorana, Sabicas, Jerez Earthquake, Tomatito, Vicente Amigo	Universal Music Spain SL
2014	La Luna de Alejandra	Daniel Casares	Green Cow Music
2015	Picassares	Daniel Casares, Orquesta Filarmónica de Málaga, Arturo Díez Boscovich	Green Cow Music
2015	Juanito Valderrama (1916–2016)	Ana Belén, Antonio Carmona, Antonio Fidel, Arcángel, Carlos Grilo, Daniel Casares, David Lopez, David Peña Dorantes, David San Jose, Diana Navarro, Diego Montoya, Estrella Morente, Georvis Pico, Javier Colina, Javier Gallego, Joan Manuel Serrat, José Luis Perales, José Mercé, Juan Carlos García, Juanito Valderrama, Luis Dulzaides, Manolo García, Martirio, Miguel Poveda, Moisés P. Sánchez, Niño de Pura, Paquito Gonzalez, Paquito González, Pasión Vega, Pepe Habichuela, Pepe Rivero, Rocío Márquez, Silvia Pérez Cruz, Virginia, and Víctor Manuel	Universal Music Spain S.L.
2015	321 Días en Michigan (Banda Sonora Original)	Celia Flores, Daniel Casares, El Kanka, Gordo Master, Irene Lombard, Javier Ojeda, Jose Carra, Juan Heredia, Little Pepe, Tabletom	Kromatik Musik
2018	Orquesta Filarmónica de Málaga	Daniel Casares	Green Cow Music

== Filmography ==
- Cecilia Bartoli: The Barcelona Concert, (2008)
- El Discípulo (The Disciple), (2010)
- Buenafuente, (2011)
- The Fury of a Patient Man, (2016)

== Awards and recognition ==
Casares won the National Bordón Minero Guitar Prize at the age of 16 years. He is the recipient of Nacional del Primer Concurso de Guitarra in Jaén, Spain, the 37th Festival del Cante de las Miñas de la Union in Murcia and the Thomson Music Best Artiste of the Year Award in 2000. Casares was awarded the Ace Award from the Association of Latin Entertainment Critics, New York City after his performance at the Thalia Spanish Theatre in New York in March 2004.
