= Cuca Roseta =

Portuguese singer, composer, and model

- Born: Maria Isabel Rebelo Couto da Cruz Roseta; 2 December 1981 (age 43); Lisbon, Portugal
- Genres: Fado; World music
- Occupations: Musician; songwriter
- Instrument: Vocals
- Labels: Sony Music
- Website: cucaroseta.com

Maria Isabel Rebelo Couto da Cruz Roseta (born 2 December 1981), known professionally as Cuca Roseta, is a Portuguese fado singer, composer, and model. Roseta is considered one of the most important fado representatives of her generation, appearing early in her career in the movie Fados by Spanish director Carlos Saura. Fado, a musical genre that originated in Lisbon in the early 19th century, is traditionally characterized by feelings of resignation and melancholia, but Roseta's style also incorporates more upbeat influences from world music. She has released seven studio albums with producers including Gustavo Santaolalla and Nelson Motta, has toured extensively, and collaborated with different artists including David Bisbal, Karl Jenkins, and Stewart Sukuma. Roseta has appeared on the television shows Got Talent Portugal, Rising Star, and The Voice Kids Portugal as a judge, and as a competitor in Dancing with the Stars. She has worked toward causes such as road safety and environmental sustainability, and in 2021 gave a series of hospital concerts to the health professionals fighting against the COVID-19 pandemic.

== Career ==
=== Beginnings ===
Cuca Roseta began her musical career by singing in her church choir; she then became a rock singer after being recruited by her friend Tiago Bettencourt to the group Toranja during her teenage years. Roseta entered the fado scene at the age of 19, singing in Lisbon fado clubs in the Alfama district. She was encouraged to pursue a career in fado by the owner of Clube de Fado, guitarist Mário Pacheco, as well as by singers Carlos Zel, and Ana Moura. In 2006, Roseta competed in RTP's Festival da Canção with the song "As Minhas Guitarras", and in 2007 she appeared in the Goya Award-winning film Fados by the Spanish filmmaker Carlos Saura.

In 2009, Roseta recorded the advertisement Pingo Doce e venha cá for the Portuguese supermarket chain Pingo Doce.

=== Albums ===
Cuca Roseta's first album was released in 2011 and was produced by Gustavo Santaolalla, who saw her perform at the Clube de Fado. After this initial encounter, in which Roseta was not aware of the Argentine producer's identity, she had to wait four years to record the album due to Santaolalla's busy schedule.

In 2013, Roseta recorded the album Raíz (in English: Root), which was produced by Mário Barreiros. Roseta wrote most of the album's songs.

Roseta invited the Brazilian producer Nelson Motta to collaborate on her third album; Motta agreed to produce the album although he had not recorded an album for more than ten years. The 2015 album called Riû brought together several genres and many significant figures of world music such as Bryan Adams, Djavan, Ivan Lins, Zeca Afonso, Dorival Caymmi, Júlio Resende, Sara Tavares and Jorge Drexler. With Motta's knowledge of world music the record reinvented songs with different origins in a "world fado" style, departing from the traditional sadness of fado with cheerful rhythms and positive lyrics.

In 2017, Roseta's fourth studio album Luz, which was produced by Diogo Clemente, was released. The album contains several original songs by Roseta and compositions by artists Pedro da Silva Martins, Jorge Fernando, Carolina Deslandes, Hélder Moutinho and Mario Pacheco. The album's release was preceded in mid-October by the release of the single "Balelas". In July 2018, the track "Don't Be Late" was released as a second single.

Roseta released her fifth album Luz de Natal—a Christmas album with Portuguese versions of songs such as "Jingle Bell Rock" and "White Christmas"—in 2018. She published a book of poetry in 2019 called "One hundred poems by Cuca Roseta".

Her 2020 album Amália Por Cuca Roseta is a tribute album of songs from the repertoire of Amália Rodrigues. In December 2020 Cuca Roseta released the album Meu (in English: Mine), with all the themes written and composed by her, which is unprecedented in the fado genre. The album was presented in an online live concert on December 2, the day of her birthday.

In 2023 she released the album Rayana in collaboration with Spanish guitarist Daniel Casares.

=== Live performances ===
Cuca Roseta has toured extensively, performing in more than 30 countries, giving individual concerts and participating in music festivals such as MEO Sudoeste in 2011. In 2015, Roseta performed more than 120 concerts, both in Portugal and abroad. That year, she participated in Badasom, a flamenco and fado festival in Badajoz, Spain, where she sang a duet with Niña Pastori. In 2019, she sang in Havana during the celebration of the centenary of diplomatic relations between Cuba and Portugal. In 2020 she performed at the Teatro Real during the Madrid fado festival, participated in an event in Buenos Aires celebrating the 100th birthday of Amália Rodrigues, and sang the Portuguese national anthem at the opening of the 2020 Portuguese Grand Prix. In April 2021 she sang Lisboa inspira, the official anthem for Lisbon European Sports Capital 2021, composed by herself, at a ceremony attended by the Minister of Education of Portugal Tiago Brandão Rodrigues, and the coach of the Portuguese national soccer team Fernando Santos. At the end of the same month she was invited by the Spanish flamenco musicians Daniel Casares, guitar, and Jorge Pardo, flute and saxophone, to present their project called Supertrío in a performance at the Teatro del Soho in Málaga. In May 2025 she opened the 4th edition of the Estremoz Fado Festival.

=== Television, modelling and commercial appearances ===
Cuca Roseta has had many television appearances, mainly in Portugal. She was part of the experts' panel in Rising Star: A próxima estrela and a judge in the third and fourth seasons of Got Talent Portugal. She competed in Dança com as Estrelas ("Dancing with the Stars Portugal"), and gave a clue in an episode of The Amazing Race 23 and again in The Amazing Race Australia 3 as the judge. In 2014 Bryan Adams photographed five Portuguese female singers, including Cuca Roseta, which appeared in covers for Vogue Portugal, and were presented in the "Exposed" exhibition at the Cascais cultural center.

Roseta has done several commercials throughout her career, and served as brand ambassador for diverse companies and products such as Mitsubichi Motors, the Guess clothing brand, eyewear, jewelry, and nutritional supplements. She did a travel guide video highlighting her favorite spots in Lisbon, as part of a 2018 promotional campaign by Avani Hotels & Resorts. In 2022, Cuca Roseta partnered with the Portuguese coffee brand Kaffa to promote the company’s emphasis on national identity. As part of the collaboration, she hosted the six-episode podcast Kaffa com Alma (Kaffa with Soul), featuring conversations with guests about inspiring personal experiences.

Since 2024, Roseta has been a coach on The Voice Kids Portugal.

== Musical style ==
Cuca Roseta's style incorporates influences form jazz, bossa nova, and world music, but maintaining the purity, minimalism and simplicity of traditional fado and emphasizing narrative and meaning. Roseta has shown her versatility and curiosity with multiple international collaborations. She has sung in languages other than Portuguese, for example on the songs "Bésame Mucho" with Julio Iglesias, and "Tum Hi Ho", a Bollywood hit by Mithoon. In her live performances Roseta includes both traditional songs and more modern pop, commercial ballad and Brazilian-style songs.

Critics have highlighted her "transcendental emotion", and the elegance of her performances.

== Personal life ==
Cuca Roseta is the daughter of Miguel da Cruz Roseta and Maria Natércia Rebelo Couto, and paternal niece of Pedro Roseta, a former Minister of Culture in Portugal. She has a son named Lopo and a daughter called Benedita, born in 2016. Roseta's husband João Lapa, proposed during one of her concerts in Porto while she was performing on stage. They were married by the church in 2017 in Obidos, where she sang "Ave Maria" during the wedding. Lapa works as a conditioning and rehabilitation coach for the Premier League team Wolverhampton Wanderers F.C.

Outside music, Cuca practices painting, yoga, meditation, and is a black belt in taekwondo. She first studied law but did not finish, changing to a degree in psychology with a postgraduate degree in marketing.

=== Volunteering and activism ===
Roseta has contributed to diverse causes such as improving road safety and nature conservation. She partnered with the Automóvel Clube de Portugal to release the single "We'll all safely get home", which she performed at the 2013 gala of the International Automobile Federation. In 2019, Roseta was announced as ambassador for the Mirpuri Foundation, a non-profit organization focused in environmental sustainability. During February 2021 she gave the "Music with hope" series of concerts for health professionals fighting against the COVID-19 pandemic, a joint initiative with Hyundai Portugal. These events took place in hospitals throughout Portugal such as the Hospital Dr Nélio Mendonça in Funchal, Madeira, the Évora hospital, the Faro hospital, and the Gaia and St. João Hospitals in Porto. In April 2021 she participated in the project to recover the Serra de Monchique after it was devastated by fires in 2018. She appeared in the third episode of a web series, showing the results of the reforestation efforts.

== Discography ==
Studio albums

- 2011 – Cuca Roseta (Universal Music International and Surco)
- 2013 – Raíz (Universal Music International)
- 2015 – Riû (Universal Music International)
- 2017 – Luz (Sony Music)
- 2018 – Luz de Natal (Sony Music)
- 2020 – Amália por Cuca Roseta (Sony Music)
- 2020 – Meu (Brandit Music)

Others

- 2007 – Fados – "Rua do Capelão"
- 2014 – Nelson 70 – "Apaixonada" (with Ed Motta)

Collaborations

- 2011 – "Fado de los Barcos" (with Pierre Aderne, in Água Doce)
- 2012 – "Apelo – Soneto de Separação" (with João Braga, in Fado Nosso)
- 2012 – "É Lisboa A Namorar" (with 3JS, in Totzoverder)
- 2013 – "Canción Negra" (with Karl Jenkins, in Jenkins: Adiemus Colores)
- 2014 – "Sí Aún Te Quieres Quedar" (with David Bisbal, in Tú Y Yo)
- 2014 – "Tristes Pássaros" (with Cristiana Águas, in Cristiana Águas)
- 2014 – "Mouros" (with Stewart Sukuma, in Os Sete Pecados Capitais & Boleia Africana)
- 2017 – "Yaadon Mein" (with Jonita Gandhi, Mohammed Irfan, and Arjun Chandy, in the soundtrack of Jab Harry Met Sejal)
- 2018 – "Vamos Fugir" (with Djodje)
- 2023 – "Rayana" (with Daniel Casares)
