= Uma Canção para a Europa =

Studio album by Carlos do Carmo
- Released: 1976
- Genre: Fado
- Label: Movieplay

Carlos do Carmo chronology
Carlos do Carmo com Guitarras (1975)	Uma Canção para a Europa (1976)	Um Homem na Cidade (1977)

Uma Canção para a Europa is an album by fado singer Carlos do Carmo. It was released in 1976 on the Movieplay label. The album included the single "Uma flor de verde pinho" which was entered in Eurovision Song Contest 1976.

== Track listing ==
Side A

1. "Onde É Que Tu Moras" (Joaquim Pessoa, Paulo De Carvalho)
2. "Estrela Da Tarde" (Ary dos Santos, Fernando Tordo)
3. "Os Lobos E Ninguém" (José Luís Tinoco)
4. "Novo Fado Alegre" (Ary Dos Santos, Fernando Tordo)
5. "No Teu Poema" (José Luís Tinoco)

Side B

1. "Maria-Criada, Maria-Senhora" (Tozé Brito)
2. "Cantiga De Maio" (Joaquim Pessoa, Carlos Mendes)
3. "Uma flor de verde pinho" (Manuel Alegre, José Niza)
4. "Lisboa, Menina E Moça" (Joaquim Pessoa, Ary dos Santos, Fernando Tordo, Paulo De Carvalho)
5. "Meu Nome É Fado" (José Manuel Martins)
