= Raiz (Cuca Roseta album) =

Studio album by Cuca Roseta
- Released: May 2013
- Genre: Fado
- Length: 47:43
- Label: Universal Music Portugal

Cuca Roseta chronology
Cuca Roseta (2011)	Raiz (2013)	Riû (2015)

Raiz is the second album released by fado singer Cuca Roseta. It was released in May 2013 by Universal Music Portugal. Roseta composed the music and wrote the lyrics on most of the album's songs. Mário Barreiros and Rosetta co-produced the album. It was certified as a golden disc in August 2014.

== Track listing ==
1. Fado Do Cansaço
2. Fado Da Essência
3. Fado Do Contra
4. Fado Do Abraço
5. Fado Proibido (music by Pedro Lima)
6. Fado Da Vaidade (lyrics by Florbela Espanca)
7. Fado Do Perdão (music by André Sardet)
8. Fado Da Esperança
9. Fado Menor Isabel
10. Fado Da Entrega
11. Fado Dos Sentidos
12. Fado Do Silêncio
13. Fado De Inverno
14. Fado Da Vida (lyrics By José Avillez, music by Tozé Brito)
