= Shōji Kojima =

Japanese flamenco dancer (born 1939)

Shōji Kojima (小島章司, born October 1, 1939, in Tokushima Prefecture, Japan) is a Japanese flamenco dancer. Along with Yoko Komatsubara, Kojima is credited as being instrumental in popularising flamenco in Japan.

Kojima studied vocal music, piano, classical ballet, and modern ballet at the Musashino Academia Musicae. Originally hoping to become an opera singer, Kojima studied ballet in order to improve his movement. In 1959-1960, Kojima and other future stars of Japanese flamenco witnessed the performance of Pilar López Júlvez and Antonio Gades as they toured Japan. Kojima decided to travel to Spain, now determined to become a flamenco dancer, travelling there by Transsiberian Railway in 1966. He began training at "Amor de Dios", a legendary flamenco studio. Registered in 1967 as a member of the National Ballet of Spain, he took part in a tour to the Soviet Union on a Hispano-Soviet cultural mission. In 1968 he was noticed by the singer Rafael Farina and debuted as a first dancer in Farina's company long-running performance. His appearance on a Televisión Española program "Estudio Abierto" in 1970 made him famous in Spain nationwide. During his decade-long stay in Spain he performed on the best tablaos of the country such as "Los Gallos" (Seville), "La Taberna Gitana" (Malaga) to name a few, and he marked a starting of "El Embrujo" (Seville) with Isabel Pantoja. In 1973 he performed in the welcoming ceremony for the Japan's Crown Prince Naruhito and the Crown Princess Michiko held by the Royal Family of Spain at Alcázar of Seville.

After returning to Japan in 1976, he continued to be active in flamenco, performing a new work every year. In 1980, he set up his own studio in Tokyo in 1980. The Catalan guitarist Chicuelo has been the musical director of all his performances since 1993. In 2007 and 2009 he invited Javier Latorre as director-choreographer for the pieces Poetas en Guerra and La Celestina, respectively. On February 27 his company, Ballet Shoji Kojima Flamenco, was invited to perform in the 15th Festival de Jerez with La Celestina en el Teatro Villamarta of the City of Jerez de la Frontera, Spain.

== Awards ==
- 1985 Art Festival Prize by Ministry of Education for Shin-i no homura (flame of wrath)
- 1985 18th Dance Critics Society of Japan Prize for Shin-i no homura (flame of wrath)
- 1990 Suzuko Kawakami Spanish Dance Prize for Los Gitanos: Amor y Ley (Gypsies: Love and Law)
- 1998 30th Dance Critics Society of Japan Prize for Homenaje a García Lorca
- 1999 Tokushima Prefecture Cultural Prize
- 2000 Awarded the Minister of Education Award for Fine Arts for Luna (Moon)
- 2000 Decorated with the Cruz de Oficial de la Reina Isabel (Order of the Queen Isabella in the Grade of Officer)
- 2001 33rd Dance Critics Society of Japan Prize for Fantasía Atlántida
- 2003 Received the Purple Ribbon Medal from the Emperor of Japan in recognition of his lifelong distinguished services.
- 2007 39th Dance Critics Society of Japan Prize for the «love and peace trilogy»: El Cant dels Ocells: A Pau Casals, FEDERICO and Poetas en Guerra
- 2009 Decorated with Encomienda de la Orden del Mérito Civil (Order of Civil Merit in the Grade of Commander) by the King Juan Carlos I of Spain.
- 2009 Person of Cultural Merit
- 2009 People's Honour Award of Mugi (Tokushima, Japan)
