= Amália Por Cuca Roseta =

Studio album by Cuca Roseta
- Released: May 29, 2020
- Recorded: 2018
- Genre: Fado
- Label: Sony Music

Cuca Roseta chronology
Luz de Natal (2018)	Amália Por Cuca Roseta (2020)	Meu (2020)

Amália Por Cuca Roseta is an album released by fado singer Cuca Roseta. It was released in 2020 by Sony Music. The album is Roseta's tribute to Amália Rodrigues, an album on which she interprets the classic fado songs of Amália. Roseta is accompanied on the album by Portuguese guitar (Mário Pacheco and Luís Guerreiro), fado viola (Diogo Clemente), and bass viola (Marino de Freitas). "Barco Negro" and two other songs also include percussion. Reviewer Leonor Alhinho wrote: Calm, intimate and of an excellent vocal quality, this album is a must for anyone who enjoys fado."

== Track listing ==
1. Vagamundo
2. Lágrima
3. Marcha Do Centenário
4. Ai Mouraria
5. Fado Malhoa
6. Fadista Louco
7. Marcha Da Mouraria
8. Com Que Voz
9. Estranha Forma De Vida
10. Barco Negro
