= J: Beyond Flamenco =

- Directed by: Carlos Saura
- Written by: Carlos Saura
- Produced by: Gabriel Arias-Salgado; Axel Kuschevatzky
- Starring: Ara Malikian; Sara Baras
- Cinematography: Paco Belda
- Music by: Alberto Artigas; Giovanni Sollima
- Release date: 3 October 2016
- Running time: 90 minutes
- Country: Spain
- Language: Spanish

J: Beyond Flamenco is a 2016 Spanish musical film directed by Carlos Saura. It was selected to be screened in the Masters section at the 2016 Toronto International Film Festival.

The film's premiere in Spain was in Zaragoza on October 3, 2016, with the presence of the director, Carlos Saura, the producers, César Alierta (Telefonica / Movistar) and Leslie Calvo (Tres Monstruos Media) and the main artists: Juan Manuel Cañizares (guitar), Carlos Núñez (bagpiper), Miguel Angel Berna (dancer), Manuela Adamo (dancer) and Nacho del Río (singer).

== Cast ==
- Ara Malikian
- Carlos Núñez
- Sara Baras
- Juan Manuel Cañizares
- Miguel Ángel Berna
- Nacho del Río
- Beatriz Bernad
- Francesco Loccisano
- Giovanni Sollima
- Manuela Adamo
