= Luz de Natal =

Studio album by Cuca Roseta
- Released: November 2018
- Genre: Christmas
- Length: 1:01
- Label: Sony Music

Cuca Roseta chronology
Luz (2017)	Luz de Natal (2018)	Amália Por Cuca Roseta (2020)

Luz de Natal is an album of Christmas music released by fado singer Cuca Roseta. It was released in November 2018 by Sony Music.

== Track listing ==
1. Estamos Quase no Natal (Hark the Herald) 3:26
2. White Christmas 3:09
3. É Natal (Jingle Bell Rocks) 2:42
4. Nasceu o Amor (The First Noel) 2:44
5. Oh Noite Sagrada (Oh Holly Night) 3:00
6. Toca o Sino (Winter Wonderland) 2:37
7. Adeste Fideles 3:56
8. Have Yourself a Merry Little Christmas 4:18
9. Vai Chegar o Grande Dia (Deck the Hall) 2:48
10. Noite Sagrada (Silent Night) 3:33
11. Gloria In Excelsis (In Excelsis Deo) 3:37
12. Avé Maria (Schubert) 3:42
13. The Christmas Song 3:41
14. Vou Tentar 3:32
15. Silver Bells 2:58
16. Pinheiro Verde de Natal (Oh Christmas Tree) 3:26
17. I'll Be Home for Christmas 2:56
18. Avé Maria (Gounod) 2:48
19. Pinheiro da VIda (Little Town) 2:48
