= Riû =

Studio album by Cuca Roseta
- Released: 2015
- Genre: Fado
- Label: Universal Music Portugal

Cuca Roseta chronology
Raiz (2013)	Riû (2015)	Luz (2017)

Riû is the third album released by fado singer Cuca Roseta. It was released in 2015 by Universal Music Portugal. It was produced by Nelson Motta. The album extended beyond the fado tradition and included songs written for Rosetta by Bryan Adams and Djavan. Roseta described it as "a happy album with so many positive lyrics and revealing the other face of fado, intense but hopeful".

== Track listing ==
1. Riû Riû
2. Tudo Por Tudo Our All
3. Quem Sou Who I Am
4. Amor Ladrão Thieving Love
5. Carnaval Carnival
6. Primavera Em Lisboa Spring In Lisboa
7. Lisboa De Agora Lisboa Right Now
8. O Amor Não é Somente Amor Love Isn't Just Love
9. Verdes São Os Campos The Fields Are Green
10. Canto Do Coração The Song Of The Heart
11. Ser E Côr Being And Color
12. Tanto So Much
13. E La Chiamano Estate And They Call It Summer
14. Rua Da Oração Rua Da Oração
15. De Onde Vens Where Do You Come From
16. Ser Artista To Be An Artist
