= La Paquera de Jerez =

Francisca Méndez Garrido, known in the art world as La Paquera de Jerez (Jerez de la Frontera, Cádiz, Andalusia, May 20, 1934 – April 26, 2004), was a Spanish Romani flamenco singer (cantaora).

== Biography ==
Statue by Sebastián Santos Calero, of La Paquera de Jerez, in Jerez de la Frontera, 2009.

In Jerez, there are two neighborhoods that have traditionally produced a significant number of flamenco singers, guitarists, and dancers: the Santiago neighborhood and the San Miguel (Jerez de la Frontera) neighborhood. Francisca Méndez Garrido was born and raised in the latter, where most residents—even if not professionally—would sing bulerías, the genre most characteristic of Jerez.

Francisca—daughter of the well-known Romani figure "El Rubio" and a student of the flamenco singer Aurelio Sellés—spent her early years living through the Civil War and the subsequent postwar period, a time marked by hunger. Her parents did not allow her to attend school because she needed to earn a living on the streets; as one of nine siblings, she faced significant financial hardship. Consequently, she entered the world of the arts at an early age through flamenco singing.

The origin of her stage name lies in her childhood, when her grandfather called her "Paquerita." Over the years, this family nickname evolved into "Paquera," and she eventually registered it as her professional stage name. Later, following the flamenco tradition of identifying oneself with one's family or hometown, she adopted the suffix "de Jerez."

By the 1940s, she was already very popular in Jerez de la Frontera. Later, while still a minor, she began performing in theatrical shows. As a young woman, she traveled to Madrid, where she began to forge her own unique style of 'cante' (flamenco singing). However, her professional career began alongside the dancer Matilde Coral during a tour of Andalusia—specifically at the First Spring Festival held at the Royal Alcázar of Seville—performing with her father and her uncle Eduardo.

In 1953, she recorded her first album (on shellac discs) featuring *bulerías* and *tientos*. Later, Luis Carvajal—a native of Jerez—interceded to help La Paquera sign a contract with Philips; under this label, she would record several albums accompanied by guitarists Manuel and Juan Morao, with lyrics by Antonio Gallardo Molina and music composed by Nicolás Sánchez Ortega.

It was then that Antonio Gallardo met La Paquera and began sending her lyrics that suited the singer's temperament perfectly. He has recounted how he urged Francisca to record other genres—such as *copla*—not to become a *cuplé* singer (since she could not abandon her flamenco identity), but rather to follow the path being charted at the time by Manolo Caracol, who was already an idol of hers. A major challenge was that La Paquera was illiterate, so the lyrics had to be taught to her through sheer persistence and time.

She recorded her second album in 1957, featuring the flamenco *tango* "Maldigo tus ojos verdes" ("I Curse Your Green Eyes") by the Roma poet Antonio Gallardo Molina. That same year, Paquera traveled to Madrid and began performing at the *tablao* El Corral de la Morería. In 1959, she toured Spain with her first show: *España por bulerías*.

During the final decades of her career, starting in 1969, she was accompanied on the guitar by Parrilla de Jerez, and the two formed an extraordinary duo. She was satisfied with her professional career and felt deeply respected and proud—especially as flamenco began to gain greater prestige.

In 2002, she finally ventured to Japan at the invitation of Yoko Komatsubara, where she was welcomed with acclaim. The tour included four successful performances. An anecdote of which La Paquera was particularly proud involves the Japanese prime minister, who came to greet her, kissed her, and began to weep. This experience gave her the insight that flamenco could be understood anywhere in the world.

== Death ==
Three weeks before her death, La Paquera was admitted to the clinic after suffering a spike in blood sugar levels complicated by thrombosis, which necessitated a stay in the ICU. Her funeral took place the following day at the San Telmo Hermitage, in the heart of the San Miguel neighborhood; there, from the moment the news broke, the bells were already practicing the *Caracol*-style cadence to bid her farewell: "aliole anda y ole / alió / viva la madre / viva la madre que te parió" (long live the mother / long live the mother who gave birth to you).

== Discography ==
Albums:

- La Paquera Por Todos Los Estilos (LP, Philips, 1964)
- Ases Del Flamenco (LP, Vergara by Vergara (Editorial), 1966)
- La Paquera De Jerez Guitarras: Juan Maya, Manolo Sanlúcar accompanied by Juan Maya and Manolo Sanlúcar (LP, Vergara, 1967)
- La Paquera De Jerez acc. by Manolo Sanlúcar (LP compilation, EKIPO, 1968)
- La maestría flamenca de La Paquera de Jerez acc. by Manolo Sanlúcar (LP, Marfer, 1969)
- La Paquera De Jerez (LP, Fontana, 1970)
- Por Todos Los Estilos (LP, Fontana, 1971)
- Antología de la Canción Española acc. by Manolo Sanlúcar (LP, CBS, 1971)
- Premio Nacional «Niña de los Peines» (LP, CBS, 1972)
- La Paquera por sevillanas (LP, CBS, 1974)
- Canta (LP, Gramusic, 1976)
- Soleá tangos bulerías aires de la aurora fandango (LP, Marfer, 1976)
- La Paquera de Jerez (LP, Marfer, 1977)
- La Paquera de Jerez (cassette, Trama [subsidiary of Marfer], 1977)
- Una flamenca de tronío (compilation, LP, Philips, 1988)

=== Singles and EPs -selected ===
- Saetas por La Paquera de Jerez (EP, Philips, 1960)
- La Paquera de Jerez canta (EP, Philips, 1962)
- La Paquera canta villancicos (EP, Philips, 1962)
- Navidad and others (EP, Vergara, 1965)
- Fandangos (EP, EKIPO, 1967)
- Esto nuestro (single, Marfer, 1970)

== Filmography, as a cantaora ==
- Los duendes de Andalucía, film of Ana Mariscal, 1965.
- Rito y Geografía del Cante, TVE program of flamenco, 1971 to 1973.
- Sevillanas, película de Carlos Saura, 1994.
- Flamenco, film of Carlos Saura, 1995.
- Vengo, film of Tony Gatlif, 2000.
- Por oriente sale el sol, documentary on her visit to Japan, directed by Fernando González-Caballos, 2003.

== Awards and honors ==
- Popular Nomination by the newspaper *Pueblo*.
- Niña de los Peines Award, National Flamenco Art Contest (Concurso Nacional de Arte Flamenco), 1971.
- Proclaimed "Queen of the Bulería," Jerez de la Frontera.
- Copa de Jerez, Chair of Flamencology (Cátedra de Flamencología).
- National Singing Award (*Premio Nacional de Cante*), 1980.
- In 2003, she received the El Compás del Cante award, granted by the Cruz Campo Foundation.
- Gold Medal of Merit in the Fine Arts, 2004 (posthumous).
- Monument by Sebastián Santos Calero in Jerez.
- Street named after her in Jerez.

== See also ==
- Flamenco in Japan
