= Tauromagia =

Studio album by Manolo Sanlúcar
- Released: 1988
- Genre: Flamenco
- Length: 40:24
- Label: Universal Music International

Tauromagia is a 1988 flamenco album by virtuoso guitarist Manolo Sanlúcar. The album was extremely well received by the flamenco community and it is considered to be one of the best flamenco albums of all time.

== Background ==
Sanlúcar was influenced by Taurus in thinking of the concept for the Tauromagia album, which means "magic of bulls", paying homage to classical Spanish bullfighting. It also features artists such as Isidro Muñoz, a young Vicente Amigo, and José Mercé. Many of the tracks, especially Oracion, have made their way into the modern flamenco guitarist's repertoire. Oracion is a Rondeña, with E lydian tonalities, played with a capo on the second fret and the bottom string tuned down a step. It is especially notable for its lengthy tremolo section, which features an innovative mixture of flamenco and classical guitar picking.

== Reception ==
Tauromagia is considered by many in the flamenco community to be the finest flamenco album of all time. The website Flamenco-world.com said "Tauromagia is the most outstanding conceptual work that Flamenco has given us." La Sonanta said " “Tauromagia” is actually a milestone in the history of flamenco and hence timeless and indelible. In these pages you will discover a true masterpiece. Anyone who feels tempted to take up the challenge of tackling these themes should be aware that they are taking on a highly fascinating task, as it is one of the most beautiful and perfect creations ever to emerge from the world of flamenco."

== Track listing ==
1. Nacencia (5:46)
2. Maletilla (4:08)
3. Oracion (4:39)
4. Maestranza (4:06)
5. De Capote (4:58)
6. Tercio De Vara (4:33)
7. Banderillas (3:20)
8. De Muleta (5:16)
9. Puerta Del Principe (3.38)
