= Amar duele =

2004 album by Falete

Studio album by Falete
- Genre: Flamenco
- Label: RCA

Falete chronology
Amar duele (2004)	Puta mentira (2006)

Amar duele is the debut album by Spanish flamenco singer Falete, released in 2004.

The album garnered significant acclaim, selling 60,000 copies and propelling Falete into the spotlight as a prominent figure in the national music and media scene. Notably, it achieved a Disco de Oro award and maintained its position on the bestselling albums chart for over 10 months.

== Track listing ==
1. "Lo Siento Mi Amor"
2. "SOS"
3. "Senora"
4. "Puero Teatro"
5. "Procuro Olvidarte"
6. "Palabras Para Julia"
7. "Payaso"
8. "Amar Duele"
9. "Un Mundo Raro"
