= Luz (Cuca Roseta album) =

Studio album by Cuca Roseta
- Released: November 2017
- Genre: Fado
- Label: Sony Music

Cuca Roseta chronology
Riû (2015)	Luz (2017)	Luz de Natal (2018)

Luz is the fourth album released by fado singer Cuca Roseta. It was released in November 2017 by Sony Music. At the time of its release, Rosetta said of its title: "I wanted to make a record with this word, which has to do with the fado and also with something more spiritual, more interior." It included songs written by Pedro da Silva Martins, Hélder Moutinho, and Jorge Fernando.

== Track listing ==
1. Luzinha
2. Quero
3. Foge
4. Triste Sina
5. Balelas
6. Sábio Mudo
7. Não Demores
8. Até Ao Amanhecer
9. Ai O Amor
10. Versos Contados
11. Luz Materna
12. Saudade E Eu
13. Rosinha Da Serra D'Arga
14. Contemplação
15. Alecrim
16. Luz Do Mundo
