= Meu (album) =

Studio album by Cuca Roseta
- Released: 2020
- Genre: Fado
- Label: Anahata Musica

Cuca Roseta chronology
Amália Por Cuca Roseta (2020)	Meu (2020)

Meu is an album released by fado singer Cuca Roseta. It was released in November 2020 by Anahata Musica.

== Track listing ==
1. Preto E Branco
2. Chiça Penico
3. Finalmente
4. Bairro Português
5. Não Sei De Onde (Versão Guitarra)
6. Negrita
7. Grito
8. Meu
9. Roda Da Saia
10. À Porta Do Beijo
11. Maria
12. Amor De Domingo
13. Não Sei De Onde (Versão Piano)
