= Juan Manuel Cañizares =

Spanish flamenco guitarist and composer (born 1966)

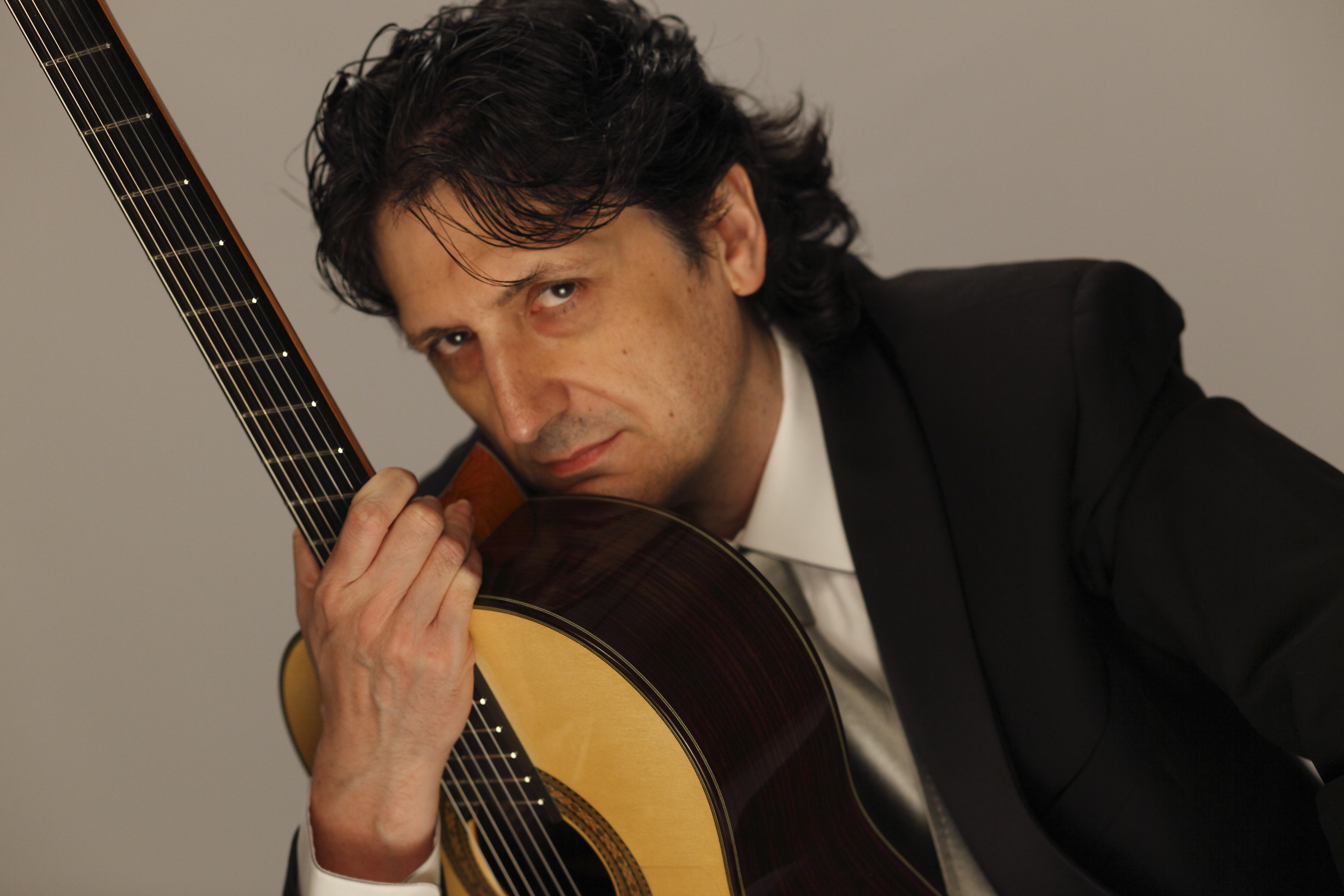

Background information
- Born: 1966 (age 59–60)
- Origin: Sabadell, Catalonia, Spain
- Genres: Flamenco, classical, jazz
- Occupations: Guitarist, Composer
- Instrument: Guitar
- Website: www.jmcanizares.com

Juan Manuel Cañizares (born 1966) is a Spanish flamenco guitarist and composer. He is a winner of the "Premio Nacional de Música" (1982) and "Premio de la Música" (2008) awards.

== Biography ==
In 1966 Juan Manuel Cañizares was born in Sabadell, Catalonia, and at age 6 started to play guitar with his brother Rafael Cañizares.

In 1982, he won the "Premio Nacional de Guitarra de la Peña Los Cernícalos" in Jerez de la Frontera, and then started to collaborate with flamenco and jazz musicians such as: Enrique Morente, Camarón de la Isla, María Pagés, Pepe de Lucía, Joan Manuel Serrat, Alejandro Sanz, Rocío Jurado, Peter Gabriel, Al Di Meola, Mike Stern, Peter Erskine, Vince Mendoza, Michael Brecker, Marc Almond, La Fura dels Baus, The Chieftains, etc. In 1989 he started to collaborate with Paco de Lucía and during next 10 years, he has performed in "Solo, Duo, Trío" and "Paco de Lucía Septet".

In 2011, Cañizares was invited by Berlin Philharmonic Orchestra to their European Concert at the Teatro Real in Madrid, Spain, and played Concierto de Aranjuez with the Orchestra conducted by Sir Simon Rattle.

Since 2003, Cañizares is a professor of flamenco guitar at the Escola Superior de Música de Catalunya. In 2016 Cañizares gave a recital in homage of his teacher Paco de Lucía. "Al Andalus" was performed at the National Auditorium with the National Orchestra of Spain.

In 2016 he participated in J: Beyond Flamenco, a film by Spanish director Carlos Saura, performing "Jota de Tárrega".

In 2019 he was the winner of the MIN award for 'Best Flamenco Album' for his album “El Mito de la Caverna“.

== Discography ==
=== As a soloist ===
- Noches de Imán y Luna (1997).
- Original Transcription of Isaac Albéniz (1999).
- Punto de Encuentro (2000).
- Suite Iberia - Albéniz por Cañizares (2007).
- Cuerdas del Alma (2010).
- Goyescas - Granados por Cañizares (2012).
- El Sombrero de Tres Picos - Falla por Cañizares Vol.1 (2013)
- La Vida Breve - Falla por Cañizares Vol.2 (2013)
- El Amor Brujo - Falla por Cañizares Vol.3 (2014)
- Sonatas - Scarlatti por Cañizares (2014)
- Danzas Españolas - Trilogía de Granados por Cañizares Vol. 1 (2017)
- Valses Poéticos - Trilogía de Granados por Cañizares Vol. 2 (2017)
- Goyescas - Trilogía de Granados por Cañizares Vol. 3 (2017)
- El Mito de la Caverna (2018)

=== Other contributions ===
- El Último de la Fila: Cuando la pobreza entra por la puerta, el amor salta por la ventana (1985).
- El Último de la Fila: Nuevas Mezclas (1987).
- El Último de la Fila: Como la Cabeza al Sombrero (1988).
- Camarón de la Isla: Autorretorato (1990).
- Jesús Heredia con Juan Manuel Cañizares: Una Antigua Voz sin Hora (1991).
- Morenito de Illora con Juan Manuel Cañizares: Morenito de Illora con Cañizares (1991).
- Diego Carrasco: A tiempo (1991).
- Paco de Lucía: Concierto de Aranjuez (1991).
- El Potito: Macandé (1992).
- A Week in the Real World Part 1 (1992).
- Marelú: Fiesta en el Cielo con Camarón (1992).
- Carlos Saura: Sevillanas (1992).
- Albert Pla: No solo de Rumba Vive el Hombre (1992).
- La Lola se va a los Puertos (Banda sonora de la película) (1993).
- Jazzpaña (1993).
- Los Jóvenes Flamencos vol. III (1994).
- Sal Marina: Callejón de los Trapos (1995).
- Carlos Saura: Flamenco (Banda sonora de la película) (1995).
- Niña Pastori: Entre Dos Puertos (1995).
- Niña Pastori: Tú me Camelas (single) (1996).
- Enrique Morente: Omega (1996).
- Pepe de Lucía: El Orgullo de mi Padre (1996).
- Los Jóvenes Flamencos vol. V (1996).
- salvador Niebla: Azul (1997).
- Malú: Aprendiz (1998).
- Los Jóvenes Flamencos vol. VI (1996).
- María Serrano: Mi Carmen Flamenca (1998).
- Enrique Morente: Morente Lorca (1998).
- Manzanita: Por tu Ausencia (1998).
- Enrique Morente: De Granada a la Luna (1998).
- Niña Pastori: Eres Luz (1998).
- Carlos Núñez: Os Amores Libres (1999).
- Carlos Cano: De lo Perdido y Otras Coplas (2000).
- Es Flamenco Es (2000).
- Duquende: Samaruco (2000).
- Kepa Junkera: Maren (2001).
- Estrella Morente: Calle del Aire (2001).
- Marina Heredia: Me Duele, Me Duele (2001).
- Crónicas marcianas: Las 101 Canciones más Flamencas (2001).
- Cantan las Guitarras (2001).
- Chanson Flamenca (2001).
- Flamenco Passion Duende & Fiesta (2002).
- Mucho Flamenco (2002).
- Remedios Amaya: Sonsonate (2002).
- Hevia: Étnico ma non Troppo (2003).
- Con Poderío Nuestro Mejor Flamenco (2003).
- Unity (CD Oficial de Juegos Olímpicos de Atenas 2004) (2004).
- Curro Piñana: De la Vigilia al Alba (2004).
- Neruda en el Corazón (2004).
- Camarón de la Isla: Alma y Corazón Flamencos (2004).
- Carmen París: La Jotera lo Serás Tú (2005).
- Enrique Morente: Enrique Sueña la Alhambra (2005).
- José Mercé: Lo que no se da (2006).
- Manu Tenorio: Entenderás (2006).
- Malú: Desafío (2006).
- Franc O'Shea: Alkimia (2006).
- Carlos Núñez: Cinema do MAr (2007).
- José Mercé: Grandes Éxitos (2007).
- Malú: Gracias (2007).
- Peter Gabriel: Big Blue Ball (2008).
- Mauricio Sotelo: Como Llora el Agua (2008).
- Los 100 mejores Flamencos (2010).
- J: Beyond Flamenco, by Carlos Saura, (2016).
