= Um Homem na Cidade =

Studio album by Carlos do Carmo
- Released: 1977
- Genre: Fado
- Label: Trova, Polygram

Carlos do Carmo chronology
Uma Canção para a Europa (1976)	Um Homem na Cidade (1977)	Dez Fados Vividos (1978)

Um Homem na Cidade (transl. A Man in the City) is an album by fado singer Carlos do Carmo. It was released in 1977 on the Trova label. Carmo was accompanied on the album by guitarists António Chainho and Raul Nery. The author of all the poems is J.C. Ary dos Santos. It was a concept album featuring an array of poems about Lisbon by Ary dos Santos. The album became one of the greatest successes of do Carmo's long career, and was described by Nery as being "one of the most significant albums in the whole fado discography". Um Homem na Cidade evinced a new, innovative style of fado.

The title track became one of do Carmo's most popular hits.

== Track listing ==
Side A

1. "Um Homem na Cidade" (Jose Luis Tinoco, J.C. Ary dos Santos)
2. "Cacilheiro" (Paulo de Carvalho, J.C. Ary dos Santos)
3. "Fado do Campo Grande" (Antonio Vitorino de Almeida, J.C. Ary dos Santos)
4. "O Amarelo da Carris" (Jose Luis Tinoco, J.C. Ary dos Santos)
5. "Namorados da Cidade" (Fernando Tordo, J.C. Ary dos Santos)
6. "Nova Feira da Ladra" (Frederico de Brito, J.C. Ary dos Santos)

Side B

1. "O Homem das Castanhas" (Paulo de Carvalho, J.C. Ary dos Santos)
2. "Rosa da Noite" (Joaquim Luis Gomes, J.C. Ary dos Santos)
3. "Fado Varina" (Moniz Pereira, J.C. Ary dos Santos)
4. "Fado dos Azulejos" (Martinho d'Assuncao, J.C. Ary dos Santos)
5. "Fado da Pouca Sorte" (Fernando Tordo, J.C. Ary dos Santos)
6. "Balada Para uma Velhinha" (Martinho d'Assuncao, J.C. Ary dos Santos)

== See also ==
- Um Homem na Cidade, a 1950s fashion project by Andrew Nunes.
