= Sara Baras =

Spanish flamenco dancer and choreographer

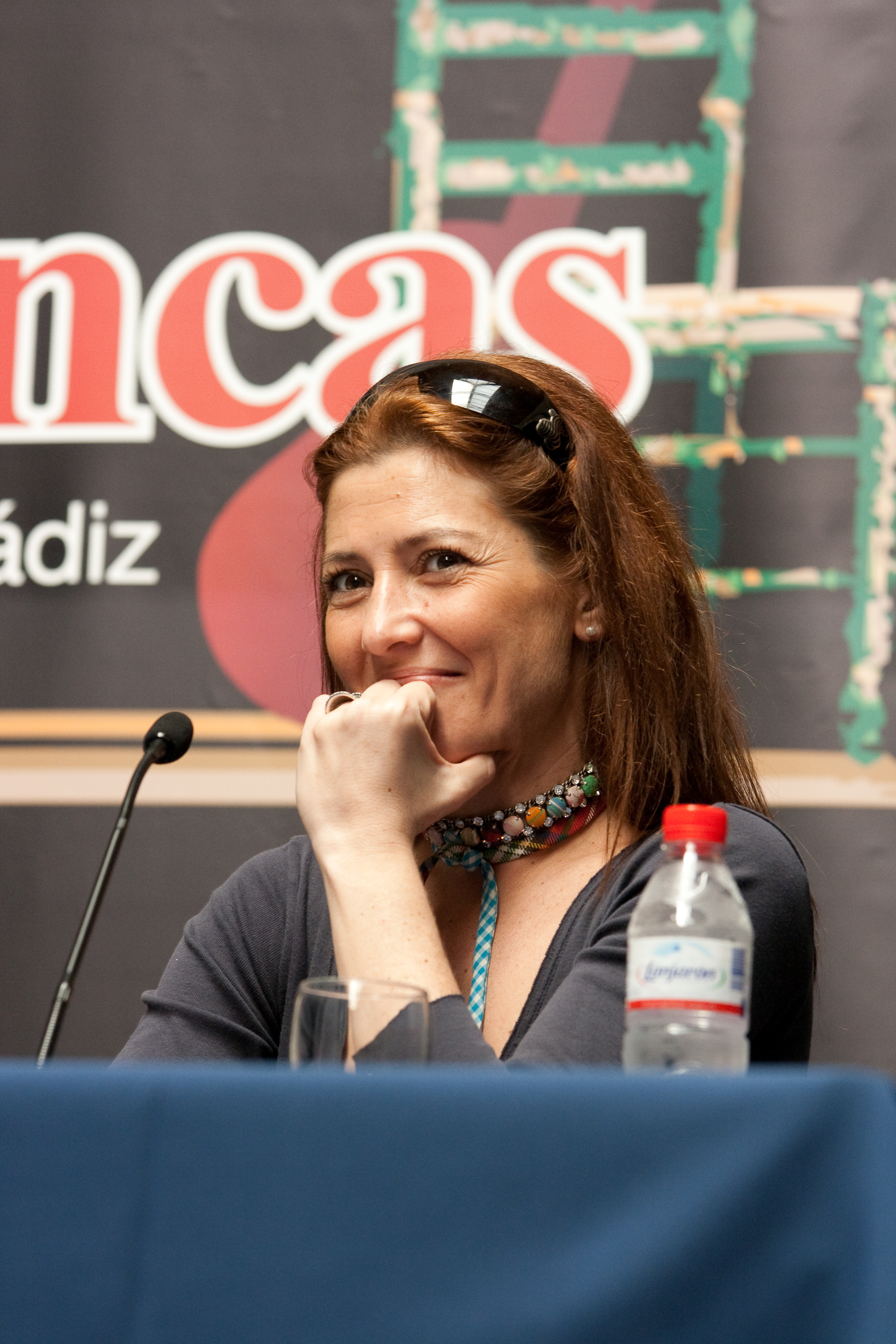
- Baras in 2010
- Born: Sara Pereyra Baras; 25 April 1971 (age 54); San Fernando (Cádiz), Spain

Sara Pereyra Baras (born April 25, 1971) is a Spanish flamenco dancer and choreographer born in San Fernando (Cádiz) who has established her own dance company.

== Biography ==
Sara was born in San Fernando, in the province of Cádiz, in 1971, where she began her dance studies at her mother’s school, Concha Baras. Shortly after, she joined the company Los Niños de la Tertulia Flamenca, with which she toured the flamenco festivals of Barcelona.

When she was 24 she entered Manuel Morao’s company and performed at the festival Teatro Flamenco Alhambra 89 in Granada. That same year, she was awarded the first prize in "Gente Joven" Spanish television contest. In 1991, with Manuel Morao’s company, she acted for two months at the Edouard VII Theater in Paris.

In 1992, she performed at the "Bienal de Danza" (Lyon), the Palais des Congrès (Paris) and then with her dance partner Javier Barón. During the worldwide exposition of Seville Expo 92, she performed at the Auditorio de la Cartuja in Manuel Morao’s show.

In 1993, she won the "Madroño Flamenco" award at Montellano (Seville) as the most outstanding artist of the year, and participated in the Festival de Sevilla with Flamenco Íntimo. Also, she danced at the Teatro Verdi in Génova with the show Mira qué flamenco.

In 1994, she danced for flamenco singer Enrique Morente in the Semana Flamenca de la Caja de Ávila festival and participated in the XXIII Festival de la Bulería de Jerez. She toured for two months with Paco Peña's company around several European countries, and danced at the "Bienal de Sevilla" in the tribute to bailaor (flamenco dancer) Antonio Ruiz Soler.

In May 1996, she was part of the show Mujeres, organized by Merche Esmeralda's company, which premiered at the Teatro Principal in Vitoria, where she began a tour in Madrid, Barcelona, the Festival de Segovia and the Veranos de la Universidad Complutense festival in Madrid. She was an invited artist in the production Gitano by the bailaor Antonio Canales. This show was presented at the Bienal de Flamenco de Sevilla and toured at the Festival de Otoño in Madrid in the Albéniz Theater, the Champs Elysees Theater, as well as important theaters in Spain.

As a solo dancer, she took part in several tributes to Camarón de la Isla. She established her own company in 1997, performing in the closure of the XXXVII Festival Nacional del Cante de las Minas. As a guest artist, she danced for the Flamenco Company of "El Güito" in the Teatro del Chatelet of Paris in the Christmas of 1999.

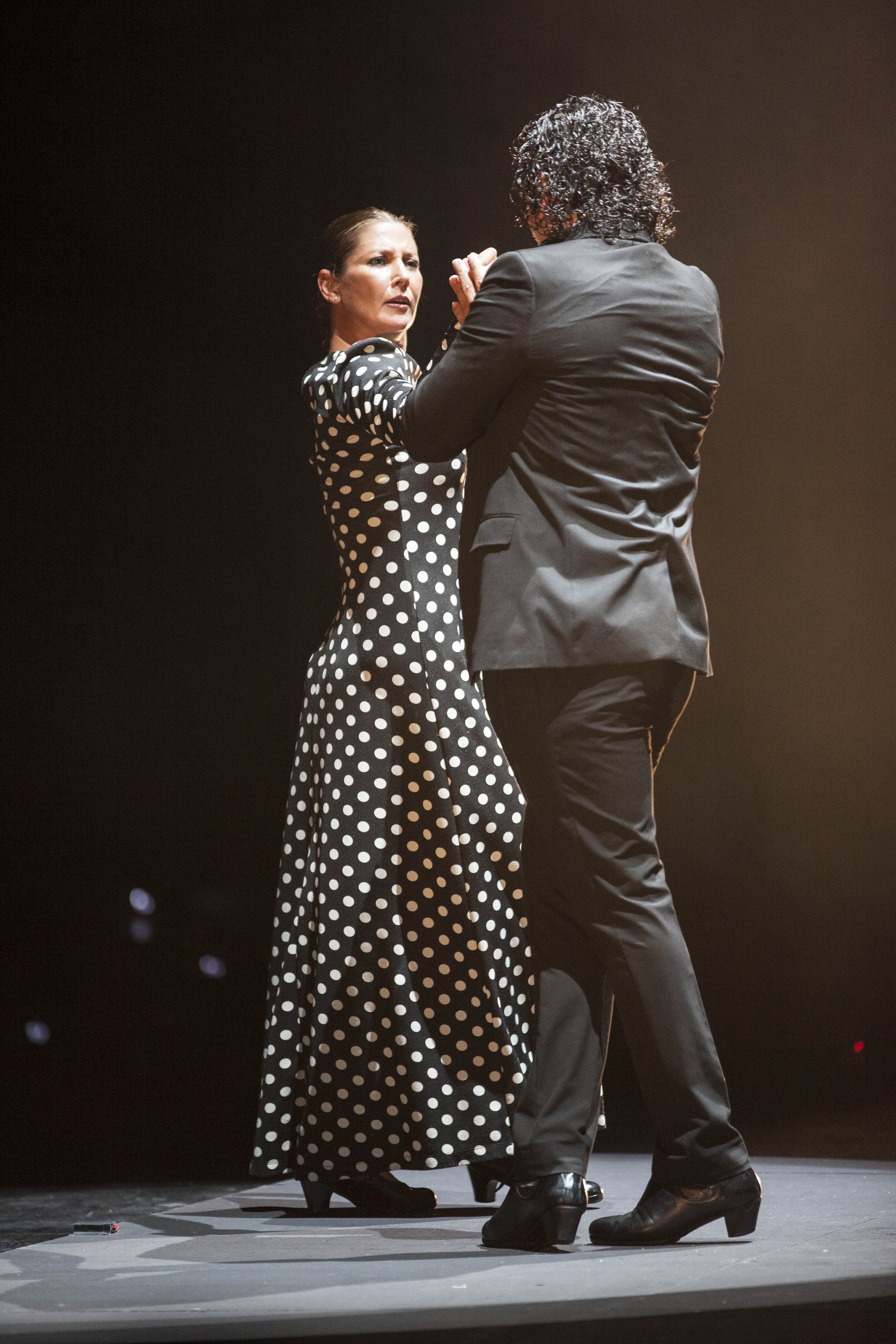
Sara Baras dancing flamenco, 2015

On April 2, 1998, she debuted in the Auditorio de Murcia with her company composed by herself, seven dancers and seven musicians, with a show called Sensaciones, a tour around the different varieties or "palos" of flamenco. At the end of that month, she participated in the television program La Huella de España, organized by the Spanish authors association, SGAE, as a guest artist of Antonio Canales’ Ballet Flamenco. In June, she performed with her company in the Festival de Evian, directed by the master Rostropóvich. In September 1998, the Ballet Flamenco Sara Baras was premiered at the Teatro de la Maestranza in Seville, a show dedicated to Cadiz: Cadiz - La isla. In October 1998, Sara presented in Spanish television, TVE, the show Algo más que flamenco. From January 8 to 14, 2001, she presented her work at the Maison de la Danse in Lyon.

In 1999, she premiered the show Sueños. While performing the show Juana la loca, she rehearsed her next show, Mariana Pineda. She danced at concerts by Chavela Vargas at Federico García Lorca’s house in the Huerta de San Vicente in Granada, at the Teatro Falla in Cadiz, at the Palau de la Música in Barcelona, at La Alhóndiga in Guanajuato, at the Festival de Teatro de Bogotá and in the Luna Park of Buenos Aires. She participated in the film Iberia directed by Carlos Saura, with her own choreography (Albaicín) and another designed in collaboration with José Serrano (Asturias). The film was premiered in November 2005.

In July 1999, on the Patio of the Casa de Pilatos in Seville, she was filmed for Mission: Impossible 2. As a model, she has appeared in the shows of Amaya Arzuaga at London Fashion Week and for Francis Montesinos Madrid and Lisbon.

In 2003 she obtained the Spanish National Dance Award (Premio Nacional de Danza).

In 2005, she continued touring the show Sueños all over Europe, the United States, South America and Asia. On December 19, she premiered the show Sabores at the Théâtre des Champs-Elysées in Paris. With Sueños she closed a trilogy of recitals that began with Sensaciones.

She also promoted an underwear collection by Triumph with other members of her dance company, and she was featured in a catalogue for Cartier.

She has participated in the film J: Beyond Flamenco, by Carlos Saura (2016).

== Shows hosted by her company ==
- Sensaciones, 1998.
- Càdiz- La Isla, 1998.
- Sueños, 1999.
- Juana la loca, 2000, which won 3 prizes.
- Mariana Pineda, 2002.
- Sabores, 2005.
- Baras-Carreras, 2006.
- Carmen, 2007.
- Esencia, 2009.
- La Pepa, 2013.
- Medusa, 2014.
- Voces, 2015.
- Sombras, 2018.

== Awards ==
- 2015
- Medal of Cadix province
- 2010
- APDE (Asociación de Profesores de Danza Española) prize in recognition of her work in the teaching and diffusion of dance.
- 2009
- Médaille de Vermeil Paris – France
- Award for a life dedicated to dancing. 40th anniversary of El Corral de La Pacheca
- “Giraldillo de Oro” award to the best scenic direction. Bienal of Flamenco 2008 – by “Carmen”.
- 2008
- “Premio de Rojas” - Best dance show: “Sabores”-, granted by the spectators of the Toledo Coliseum (spectators receive in their houses the programming of the theater and they go regularly to the shows)
- “Premio Galileo 2000” -for a life dedicated to dance-, granted by the city of Florence through the Agenzia Genelare di Firenze
- 2007
- “Medalla de Plata” granted by the city council of Zaragoza.
- “Premio a la identidad isleña” granted by the city council of San Fernando, Cadiz.
- “Premio Flamenco hoy a la mejor bailaora del año”, granted by the association of flamenco critics.
- “Premio El Quijote flamenco” to the best flamenco dancer of the year, granted by the cybernauts of the website, flamenco.com
- “Premio Puerta de Andalucía”, granted by Junta de Andalucía and Summa Hoteles.
- 2006
- “Premio a la Creatividad” granted by the Community of Madrid and the Camilo José Cela Foundation.
- “Premio Teatre” to the best show of the year granted by the specialized Catalan press.
- “Gaditana del año”
- “Hija Predilecta de Cádiz” – Municipal Corporation
- 2005
- “Corazón de Oro” granted by Fundación Española del Corazón.
- 2004
- “Medalla de Oro de Andalucía”.
- “Women Together” award granted by the Foundation Women Together, a UNESCO collaborating agency, within the framework of the "Dialogue on poverty, microcredit and development" of the Forum Barcelona 2004.
- “Micrófono de Oro” prize, granted by the Asociación Española de Radio Y Televisión.
- Prize to the Best Dance Show granted by the audience of the Teatro Metropol de Tarragona for the Mariana Pineda show.
- 2003
- National Dance Award in the Performance category for the Mariana Pineda show.
- Chilean Critics Circle Award for Mariana Pineda.
- Pregonera in the presentation of Carnaval de Cadiz in Madrid.
- 2002
- Pregonera of the Vigésimo Tercer Pregón in the Carnaval de Cadiz.
- Max Award of the Scenic Arts in the category of “Best Female Dance Performer”, “Best Dance Show” and “Best Choreography” for Juana la loca.
- 2001
- “Premio de la Crítica de la Cátedra de Flamencología de Jerez”.
- Public Prize of the Diario de Jerez (journal).
- “Gaditana de oro” by popular vote in Onda Cero Cadiz.
- 2000
- Sara Baras is part of the World Philatelic Exhibition held in Madrid and is the female representative of dance in Spain in a limited edition of stamps edited by Correos y Telégrafos. She was the first flamenco woman to have this recognition.
- 1999
- Max Prize for the Performing Arts in the category "Best Female Performer of Dance", for Sensaciones.
- El Olivo del Baile of the El Olivo magazine.
- 1993
- VI Madroño flamenco of the Peña Flamenca El Madroñero Sevillano.
- 1989
- X Calahorra Flamenca of Cordoba.
- 1989
- “Gente Joven” Award of Televisión Española.

== See also ==
- List of dancers
