= Flamenco (1995 film) =

- Theatrical release poster
- Directed by: Carlos Saura
- Written by: Carlos Saura
- Produced by: Juan Lebrón
- Starring: La Paquera de Jerez; Merche Esmeralda; Manolo Sanlúcar; Joaquín Cortés; Manuel Moneo
- Cinematography: Vittorio Storaro
- Edited by: Pablo del Amo
- Music by: Isidro Muñoz
- Release dates: 16 June 1995 (Spain); 25 April 1997 (U.S.)
- Running time: 102 minutes
- Country: Spain
- Language: Spanish
- Box office: $449,964.00

Flamenco is a 1995 Spanish documentary film directed by Carlos Saura with camerawork by cinematographer Vittorio Storaro. The film is entirely musical and dancing vignettes, composed and photographed on a sound stage.

== Synopsis ==
Flamenco is a documentary that includes performances from some of the best flamenco singers, dancers and guitarists. With the masterful cinematography of the Oscar winning director of photography Vittorio Storaro, director Carlos Saura brings with this film the "Light of Flamenco to the World".

As a hall fills with performers, a narrator says that flamenco came from Andalucia, a mix of Greek psalms, Mozarabic dirges, Castilian ballads, Jewish laments, Gregorian chants, African rhythms, and Iranian and Romany melodies. The film presents thirteen rhythms of flamenco, each with song, guitar, and dance: the up-tempo bulerías, a brooding farruca, an anguished martinete, and a satiric fandango de Huelva. There are tangos, a taranta, alegrías, siguiriyas, soleás, a guajira of patrician women, a petenera about a sentence to death, villancicos, and a final rumba. Families present numbers, both festive and fierce. The camera and the other performers are the only audience.

Singing, dancing and guitar playing are often combined within a single number. Some songs are performed a cappella, and some guitar solos are accompanied by hand-clapping or by knuckles rapped on a table. Several numbers feature children dancing with their parents, and older performers also appear. The film ends with a class of dance students.

== Cast ==
Performances by: Paco de Lucía, Joaquín Cortés, Manolo Sanlúcar, Lole y Manuel, La Paquera de Jerez, Fernanda de Utrera, José Menese, Enrique Morente, José Mercé, Farruco y Farruquito, Ketama, Manzanita, Maria Pagès and many others at the old Seville train station.

== DVD release ==
Flamenco was issued on DVD by New Yorker Video in December 2003, in Spanish with English subtitles. The lyrics of the songs are translated in the subtitles (the only "dialog" in the film).

== See also ==
- Flamenco at 5:15, a 1983 Oscar-winning documentary about flamenco
