= Flamenco in Japan =

Flamenco in Japan was introduced in the 1920s, when the Japanese began to be interested in this art, and since then it has evolved and spread throughout the Asian country, which has made Japan the second homeland of the Flamenco. Many Japanese have traveled to Spain to learn the roots of flamenco and learn it in depth.

== History ==
Flamenco first came to Japan in the 1920s. Bailaora Antonia Mercé, La Argentina, toured Japan and purportedly delighted audiences with productions from the film El amor brujo and from Andalucía. The historical period of the 1920s in Japan was dominated by the Taisho Era (1912-1926), a short period of great importance. Japan had a great international weight, and so, participated in the Peace Conference held in Paris in 1919. During the Taisho democracy, restructurings were carried out and the emperor resumed his role as a legitimating figure. It was a period of revolutions, especially in the female figure. The modernity coming from Occident provoked a new generation of more liberal women who were interested in artistic activities, among which was flamenco.

Spanish flamenco companies and flamenco masters, such as Pilar López, Antonio Gades, Manolo Vargas, Roberto Ximénez, Luisillo, Rafael Romero, Merche Esmeralda, El Güito or Paco de Lucia traveled to Japan, and its time of maximum expansion was in the late 1950s. In the 1950s, many Japanese students like Yasuko Nagamine, Yoko Komatsubara, Masami Okada, Shoji Kojima, among others, were the first bailaores (dancers) who travelled to Spain to deepen their learning.

== Characteristics ==
The interest that flamenco awakens in the Japanese population is the result of a way of understanding life based on the self-development of any action that implies personal growth, whether it is with an artistic, academic or cultural focus. Flamenco is a traditional Spanish art-form based upon traditional music development in Southern Spain. Even though Japan, due to its strict social and behavioral norms, does not develop it in society, what attracts the practice of this art is precisely the way in which feelings are expressed and the way to feel free. Flamenco coincides with the oriental rhythm, which is why many Japanese people move unconsciously when they hear it and reassure themselves in the style of "mi", which is the typical model of flamenco. In addition, the hoarse voice of flamenco is a peculiarity that it shares with oriental voices.

In Japan, in general, it is the female figure that is closest to the practice of this dance. Women are the audience that most attends the flamenco shows that are held in Japan. There are two flamenco federations in Japan, one is for the general population and another is only for the university students, who have the opportunity to learn and practice flamenco, and stay in the city of Tateyama to train intensively during the summer. Each year, Japanese students travel to Spain to learn and perfect their flamenco.

== Personalities ==
The arrival of flamenco in Japan involved the interest of the Japanese in the practice of this dance. Dancers like Shoji Kojima, Yoko Tamura, Yoko Komatsubara or Yoko Omor have been pioneers and referents of flamenco in Japan.

Shōji Kojima, born on the shores of the Pacific in the 1960s, came to Spain to learn flamenco and worked in the company of Rafael Farina. In the 70's, Yoko Komatsubara was born. She was a Japanese who studied dramatic art in Tokyo but finally dedicated her life to flamenco and is one of the most important bailaoras in Japan.

Currently, Yoko Tamura and Yoko Omor are two of the most significant bailaoras in Japan. Yoko Tamura, a bailaora and choreographer born in Tokyo, has participated in the Cante de las Minas Festival of La Unión (Murcia), among others, while Yoko Omor, who has been studying and practicing since 2008, was selected in a contest held in Nipona for the unionense contest and the Nippon Flamenco Association.
