= Manolo Sanlúcar =

Spanish flamenco composer and guitarist (1943–2022)

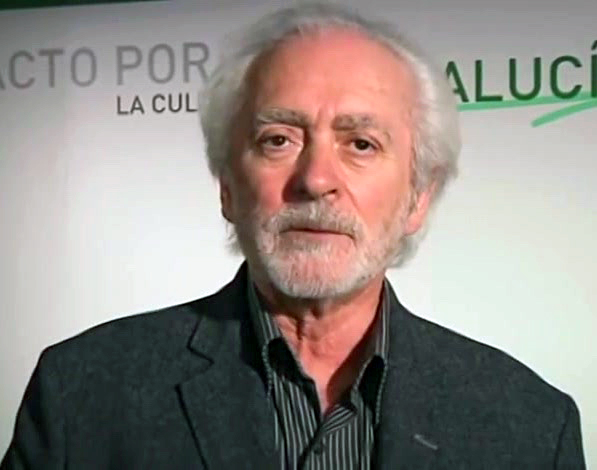
- Sanlúcar in 2013

Background information
- Born: Manuel Muñoz Alcón; 24 November 1943; Sanlúcar de Barrameda, Spain
- Died: 27 August 2022 (aged 78) Jerez de la Frontera, Spain
- Genres: Flamenco
- Occupations: Composer; guitarist; teacher
- Instrument: Guitar
- Years active: c. 1950s–2013
- Website: manolosanlucar.com

Manolo Sanlúcar (born Manuel Muñoz Alcón; 24 November 1943 – 27 August 2022) was a Spanish flamenco composer, guitarist and teacher. He was one of the major figures in the development of the modern flamenco guitar, and a substantial part of his career was devoted to treating flamenco as a compositional language for concert, orchestral and theatrical forms.

Alongside Paco de Lucía, Niño Ricardo and Sabicas, Sanlúcar is commonly cited as one of the flamenco composers who broadened the harmonic, formal and concert possibilities of flamenco in the second half of the twentieth century. His best-known works include Fantasía para guitarra y orquesta, Trebujena, Medea, Tauromagia, Soleá, Aljibe and Locura de brisa y trino.

== Early life and training ==
Sanlúcar was born Manuel Muñoz Alcón in Sanlúcar de Barrameda, in the province of Cádiz, in 1943. He grew up in a flamenco family: his father, Isidro Muñoz, was a guitarist and became his first teacher. Sanlúcar later adopted his stage name from his home town.

He began playing professionally as a child. According to Classical Guitar, he made his professional debut at the age of thirteen and was supported in his early career by La Niña de los Peines. He later worked for a long period as accompanist to La Paquera de Jerez, an apprenticeship in cante accompaniment that remained important to his later musical language.

Sanlúcar's early formation placed him within the older practice of the flamenco guitarist as accompanist for singers and dancers. At the same time, his later career was shaped by an interest in expanding the instrument beyond accompaniment and solo recital into composed forms. In a retrospective profile, Classical Guitar quoted him as saying that his generation felt the guitar needed to be "harmonically enriched".

== Career ==
=== Early professional career and first recordings ===
Sanlúcar's first professional years were spent in the environment of flamenco companies, tablaos and accompaniment. After his early apprenticeship, he began to appear in concerts and recitals around Spain, developing a reputation for a clean sound and technical control.

His early recordings included Recital flamenco, Inspiraciones and the three-volume Mundo y formas de la guitarra flamenca. These albums presented him as a solo guitarist but also showed a systematic interest in flamenco forms and the expressive resources of the guitar. In the 1970s he began to reach a wider audience with recordings such as Sanlúcar and the rumba "Caballo negro", while continuing to pursue a more ambitious compositional direction.

Sanlúcar's early solo output coincided with a period of experimentation in Spanish flamenco. Like other guitarists of his generation, he worked within traditional flamenco forms while introducing broader harmonic and formal resources. This position between traditional flamenco practice and modern concert composition became one of the defining features of his career.

=== Flamenco and orchestral composition ===
From the late 1970s onward, Sanlúcar increasingly emphasized composition. Fantasía para guitarra y orquesta, released in 1977 or 1978 according to different discographical listings, was a work for guitar and orchestra and is often treated as the beginning of his sustained attempt to place flamenco within orchestral concert forms. He later composed Trebujena, another concert work for guitar and orchestra, which World Music Central describes as opening "a new door to flamenco in the path of classical music".

The aim of these works was not simply to add orchestral accompaniment to flamenco guitar. Sanlúcar's writings and interviews repeatedly framed flamenco as a complete musical language, capable of formal development and analysis. His orchestral and stage compositions sought to translate flamenco rhythm, sonority and affect into larger instrumental textures while retaining the identity of flamenco idioms.

This compositional project continued in works such as Aljibe, described by World Music Central as a flamenco symphony for guitar, orchestra, voices and percussion that premiered in Málaga in 1992 with the Orquesta Ciudad de Málaga conducted by Enrique García Asensio. Other listings of his symphonic or extended works include La Gallarda, Mariana Pineda, Música para ocho monumentos andaluces, Viva la Blanca Paloma and a version of the Andalusian anthem.

=== Stage works: Ven y sígueme, Medea and Soleá ===
Sanlúcar also wrote for the stage. Ven y sígueme, also known as Un gitano llamado Mateo, has been described as a flamenco opera or theatrical flamenco work and included the participation of singers such as El Lebrijano and Rocío Jurado.

One of Sanlúcar's most significant stage works was Medea, composed for the Ballet Nacional de España. The Ballet Nacional de España repertory page lists the absolute premiere of Medea on 13 July 1984 at the Teatro de la Zarzuela in Madrid and credits José Granero with choreography and Manolo Sanlúcar with the original music. The work's libretto was adapted by Miguel Narros from Seneca, with sets by Andrea D’Odorico and costumes by Narros.

Medea remained in the repertory of Spanish dance after its premiere. In 2025 the Teatro Real described the piece as one of the major theatrical flamenco ballets, combining Narros's dramaturgy, Sanlúcar's music and Granero's choreography, and noted that it had received the New York Critics' Prize in the year of its premiere. The Instituto Nacional de las Artes Escénicas y de la Música's dance portal likewise describes Medea as one of the important theatrical dance works in the Spanish repertory and identifies Sanlúcar as its composer.

Sanlúcar later composed Soleá, another work associated with the Ballet Nacional de España and listed among his symphonic and stage works. Together, Medea and Soleá show the importance of dance theatre within his career as a composer, a part of his work that is distinct from both accompaniment and the solo guitar recital.

=== Solo-guitar and concept albums ===
Sanlúcar continued to make solo and small-ensemble albums while composing larger works. Tauromagia, released in 1988, became one of his best-known records. World Music Central describes it as a musical journey through the ritual world of bullfighting, moving from the birth of the bull to the triumphal exit through the Puerta del Príncipe. Flamenco criticism frequently treats Tauromagia as one of his central albums.

Locura de brisa y trino, released in 2000, was inspired by the poetry of Federico García Lorca and featured a reduced group rather than the large orchestral forces some listeners had expected from Sanlúcar's previous work. The album's premiere was singled out in the official order granting Sanlúcar Spain's 2000 National Music Prize for interpretation.

His final studio album, La voz del color, appeared in 2008 and has been described as a tribute to the painter Baldomero Romero Ressendi. The record continued Sanlúcar's interest in translating non-musical ideas—poetry, painting, ritual and Andalusian memory—into flamenco composition.

=== Film, television and commissions ===
Sanlúcar also worked in film, television and commissioned music. World Music Central identifies him as musical director of Carlos Saura's film Sevillanas and as the composer of music for La Enciclopedia Electrónica de Andalucía, presented at the Andalusian pavilion of Expo '92. The same source also credits him with the soundtrack to the Japanese documentary Viva la Blanca Paloma, recorded in London with the Royal Philharmonic Orchestra under Sanlúcar's direction.

These projects reflected his broader interest in Andalusian cultural identity. Rather than separating flamenco from other artistic media, Sanlúcar repeatedly used it as a means of engaging with poetry, painting, theatre, dance, film and regional history.

== Teaching, writing and didactic work ==
Sanlúcar had an important role as a teacher and transmitter of flamenco guitar. Profiles of later flamenco guitarists frequently note his influence on younger players, and official recognition of his career often emphasized both his artistic and academic work.

In 2007 he published his memoir El alma compartida. Google Books lists the book as an illustrated volume published by Editorial Almuzara in 2007, with 495 pages and ISBN 9788496968219.

In his later years Sanlúcar devoted himself to La guitarra flamenca, Manolo Sanlúcar, an audiovisual and written didactic project on flamenco. The Ayuntamiento de Sanlúcar de Barrameda described the work as an artistic-didactic history of flamenco, written, directed, produced and presented by Sanlúcar after fifteen years of work and with the participation of more than forty artists. According to the same source, the project consisted of two books—Andalucía: La otra historia, in three volumes, and La escuela, in two volumes—together with twelve DVDs and forty-one musical themes.

The project is significant because it shows Sanlúcar's late-career effort to codify flamenco knowledge rather than only perform or record it. The guitar served as the guiding thread for explaining flamenco's forms, or palos, together with cante and dance.

== Musical style and significance ==
Sanlúcar's music is often described through the tension between tradition and expansion. He was formed in the older world of accompaniment, yet his mature work treated flamenco as a language with possibilities for extended composition. His career therefore occupies a space between the traditional roles of accompanist, solo guitarist, composer and pedagogue.

A recurring feature of his music is the attempt to retain flamenco's rhythmic and expressive identity while expanding its harmonic and formal vocabulary. This can be heard in the movement from early solo records such as Mundo y formas de la guitarra flamenca to later concept albums and stage works such as Tauromagia, Medea and Locura de brisa y trino.

His large-scale works also challenged a narrow understanding of flamenco as only song, dance or guitar display. In Fantasía para guitarra y orquesta, Trebujena, Aljibe and Medea, the flamenco guitar becomes part of a broader compositional structure, while in La guitarra flamenca, Manolo Sanlúcar it becomes the organizing principle for a didactic account of the art form.

== Awards and recognition ==
Sanlúcar received several institutional awards and honours. In 2000 he was awarded Spain's Premio Nacional de Música in the interpretation category. The official order, published in the Boletín Oficial del Estado in January 2001, granted the prize to Manuel Muñoz Alcón (Manolo Sanlúcar) for his musical activity, highlighting the premiere of Locura de brisa y trino in 1999.

In 2015 he was awarded the Gold Medal of Merit in the Fine Arts. The relevant royal decree, published in the Boletín Oficial del Estado, lists Manuel Muñoz Alcón (Manolo Sanlúcar) among the recipients of the Gold Medal of Merit in the Fine Arts corresponding to 2014.

He was named Favourite Son of the Province of Cádiz in 2016 and Favourite Son of Sanlúcar de Barrameda. He also received the 2020 Premio Internacional del Flamenco in the flamenco guitar category; the official history of the awards lists Manolo Sanlúcar among the 2020 recipients.

After his death, the Escuela de Flamenco de Andalucía used his name for the Premios Internacionales del Flamenco "Manolo Sanlúcar". A 2024 announcement by the Ayuntamiento de Sanlúcar de Barrameda described the prizes as a recognition for artists, musicians, researchers and promoters of flamenco, and stated that previous editions had honoured Sanlúcar in 2020.

== Death ==
Sanlúcar died on 27 August 2022 in Jerez de la Frontera, at the age of 78. Obituaries described him as one of the leading flamenco guitarists and composers of his generation and emphasized his role in expanding flamenco beyond the solo guitar repertory.

== Selected works ==
=== Concert, orchestral and stage works ===
- Fantasía para guitarra y orquesta
- Ven y sígueme / Un gitano llamado Mateo
- Trebujena, concert work for guitar and orchestra
- Testamento andaluz
- Medea, ballet, music for the Ballet Nacional de España
- Soleá, ballet
- Aljibe, flamenco symphony for guitar, orchestra, voices and percussion
- La Gallarda, on a libretto by Rafael Alberti
- Viva la Blanca Paloma, soundtrack for a Japanese documentary
- Mariana Pineda, ballet for guitar and chamber orchestra
- La guitarra flamenca, Manolo Sanlúcar, didactic audiovisual work

=== Selected discography ===
- 1968: Recital flamenco
- 1970: Inspiraciones
- 1971: Mundo y formas de la guitarra flamenca, vol. I
- 1971: Mundo y formas de la guitarra flamenca, vol. II
- 1972: Mundo y formas de la guitarra flamenca, vol. III
- 1975: Sanlúcar
- 1976: Sentimiento
- 1977: Fantasía para guitarra y orquesta
- 1978: ...Y regresarte (Homenaje a Miguel Hernández)
- 1979: Manolo Sanlúcar en Japón
- 1980: Candela
- 1981: Azahares
- 1982: Al viento
- 1982: Ven y sígueme
- 1984: Trebujena
- 1985: Testamento andaluz
- 1987: Medea
- 1987: Dos guitarras flamencas with Sabicas
- 1988: Tauromagia
- 1989: Soleá
- 1992: Aljibe
- 2000: Locura de brisa y trino
- 2008: La voz del color

== Bibliography ==
- Sanlúcar, Manolo. El alma compartida: memorias. Córdoba: Almuzara, 2007. ISBN 978-84-96968-21-9.
