= Rosalía discography =

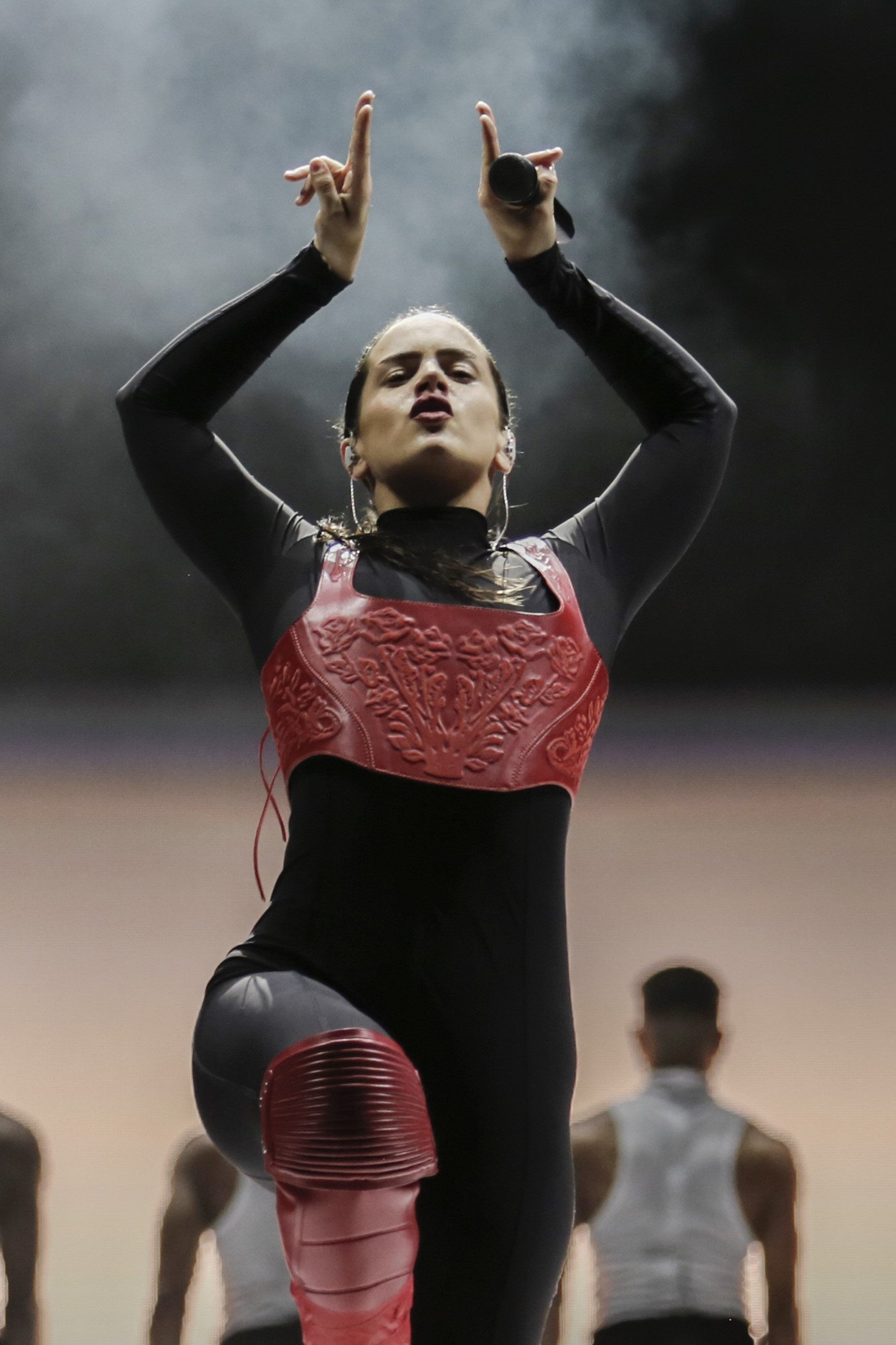
- Rosalía in 2023
- Studio albums: 4
- EPs: 2
- Singles: 39
- Music videos: 41
- Promotional singles: 4

The discography of Spanish singer Rosalía consists of four studio albums, two extended plays, 39 singles (including seven as a featured artist) and four promotional singles.

The singer released her debut album Los Ángeles in 2017. Its follow-up El Mal Querer (2018) gave Rosalía international recognition and spawned four singles. It debuted at number one in Spain and is certified triple platinum in the country. During the following years, Rosalía released the commercially successful hits "Con Altura" with J Balvin and el Guincho, "Yo x Ti, Tú x Mí" with Ozuna and "TKN" with Travis Scott. All of them preceded her third studio album Motomami (2022), which experienced critical and commercial success upon its release and spawned three singles. Her fourth studio album Lux (2025) broke the Spotify record for most streams in one day by a female Spanish-language artist, with 42.1 million. It also debuted atop the PROMUSICAE chart in Spain and within the top 5 of major market charts, including UK Albums Chart and US Billboard 200.

== Studio albums ==
List of studio albums, with selected details, chart positions, first week sales, and certifications
Title	Studio album details	Peak chart positions										First week sales	Certifications
Title	Studio album details	SPA	BEL (FL)	FRA	ITA	NLD	POR	SWI	UK	US	US Latin	First week sales	Certifications
Los Ángeles	Released: 10 February 2017; Label: Universal Spain; Format: CD, LP, digital download, streaming	9	—	—	—	—	—	—	—	—	—		PROMUSICAE: Gold
El Mal Querer	Released: 2 November 2018; Label: Columbia; Format: CD, LP, digital download, streaming	1	76	—	—	95	20	56	— (Note: El Mal Querer did not enter the UK Albums Chart, but it peaked at number 92 on the UK Albums Sales chart.)	—	10		PROMUSICAE: 3× Platinum; AMPROFON: Platinum
Motomami	Released: 18 March 2022; Label: Columbia; Format: CD, LP, digital download, streaming	1	3	15	24	12	1	6	42	33	3	SPA: 10,000; US: 2,300	PROMUSICAE: 3× Platinum; AMPROFON: 2× Platinum; FIMI: Platinum; RIAA: Gold; SNEP: Platinum
Lux	Released: 7 November 2025; Label: Columbia; Format: CD, LP, digital download, streaming	1	1	2	4	2	1	1	4	4	1	SPA: 27,946; US: 19,000	PROMUSICAE: 6× Platinum; AFP: 3× Platinum; AMPROFON: Gold; BPI: Silver; BRMA: Gold; FIMI: Gold; NVPI: Gold; SNEP: Platinum
"—" denotes a recording that did not chart or was not released in that territory.

== EPs ==
List of EPs with selected details
Title	Details
Fucking Money Man	Released: 7 July 2019; Label: Columbia; Format: Digital download, streaming
RR (with Rauw Alejandro)	Released: 24 March 2023; Label: Columbia, Duars, Sony Latin; Format: LP, digital download, streaming

== Singles ==
=== As lead artist ===
==== 2010s ====
List of singles as lead artist released in the 2010s, showing year released, selected chart positions, certifications, and originating album
Title	Year	Peak chart positions										Certifications	Album
Title	Year	SPA	ARG	BEL (FL)	FRA	ITA	MEX	POR	SWI	US	US Latin	Certifications	Album
"Catalina"	2016	—	—	—	—	—	—	—	—	—	—	PROMUSICAE: Gold	Los Ángeles
"De Plata"	2017	—	—	—	—	—	—	—	—	—	—		Los Ángeles
"Aunque es de noche"	2017	—	—	—	—	—	—	—	—	—	—	PROMUSICAE: Gold	Non-album single
"Malamente"	2018	2	—	— (Note: "Malamente" did not enter the Flemish Ultratop 50 Singles chart, but peaked at number three on the Ultratip Bubbling Under chart.)	—	—	—	79	—	—	— (Note: "Malamente" did not enter the Billboard Hot Latin Songs, but peaked at number nine on the Billboard Latin Digital Song Sales chart.)	PROMUSICAE: 5× Platinum; AMPROFON: 2× Platinum+Gold; RIAA: Gold; RIAA: Platinum (Latin); SNEP: Gold	El Mal Querer
"Pienso en tu mirá"	2018	5	—	—	—	—	—	—	—	—	—	PROMUSICAE: 3× Platinum; AMPROFON: Platinum+Gold	El Mal Querer
"Di mi nombre"	2018	1	—	—	—	—	—	—	—	—	—	PROMUSICAE: 2× Platinum; AMPROFON: Gold	El Mal Querer
"Bagdad"	2018	7	—	—	—	—	—	—	—	—	—	PROMUSICAE: Platinum; AMPROFON: Platinum	El Mal Querer
"De aquí no sales"	2019	22	—	—	—	—	—	—	—	—	—	PROMUSICAE: Gold	El Mal Querer
"Con Altura" (with J Balvin featuring el Guincho)	2019	1	1	— (Note: "Con Altura" did not enter the Flemish Ultratop 50 Singles chart, but peaked at number 17 on the Ultratip Bubbling Under chart.)	76	—	1	28	98	— (Note: "Con Altura" did not enter the Billboard Hot 100, but peaked at number 18 on the Billboard Bubbling Under Hot 100 Singles chart.)	12	PROMUSICAE: 5× Platinum; AFP: Gold; AMPROFON: 2× Diamond+3× Platinum; FIMI: Gold; IFPI SWI: Gold; RIAA: 2× Platinum; SNEP: Platinum	Non-album singles
"Aute Cuture"	2019	1	—	— (Note: "Aute Cuture" did not enter the Flemish Ultratop 50 Singles chart, but peaked at number nine on the Ultratip Bubbling Under chart.)	—	—	—	79	—	—	39	PROMUSICAE: Platinum	Non-album singles
"Milionària" (Note: "Milionària" and "Dios Nos Libre del Dinero" were released as a two sided single titled "Fucking Money Man", with "Milionària" being promoted as A-side or lead single and "Dios Nos Libre del Dinero" serving as B-side.)	2019	1	—	—	—	—	—	—	—	—	— (Note: "Milionària" did not enter the Billboard Hot Latin Songs, but peaked at number 15 on the Billboard Latin Pop Digital Song Sales chart.)	PROMUSICAE: 2× Platinum	Fucking Money Man
"Yo x Ti, Tú x Mí" (with Ozuna)	2019	1	12	— (Note: "Yo x Ti, Tú x Mí" did not enter the Flemish Ultratop 50 Singles chart, but peaked at number one on the Ultratip Bubbling Under chart.)	189	61	16	29	29	— (Note: "Yo x Ti, Tú x Mí" did not enter the Billboard Hot 100, but peaked at number 17 on the Billboard Bubbling Under Hot 100 Singles chart.)	12	PROMUSICAE: 5× Platinum; AFP: Gold; AMPROFON: Diamond+3× Platinum+Gold; FIMI: Platinum; IFPI SWI: Platinum; RIAA: Platinum; SNEP: Platinum	Non-album singles
"A Palé"	2019	16	—	—	—	—	—	—	—	—	42	PROMUSICAE: Gold	Non-album singles
"—" denotes a title that was not released or did not chart in that territory. "*" indicates a chart that did not exist at the time.

==== 2020s ====
List of singles as lead artist released in the 2020s, showing year released, selected chart positions, certifications, and originating album
Title	Year	Peak chart positions										Certifications	Album
Title	Year	SPA	ARG	FRA	ITA	MEX	POR	SWI	US	US Latin	WW	Certifications	Album
"Juro Que"	2020	7	—	—	—	—	139	—	—	41	—	PROMUSICAE: Gold	Non-album singles
"TKN" (with Travis Scott)	2020	1	7	52	16	17	2	6	66	2	126	PROMUSICAE: 2× Platinum; AFP: 2× Platinum; AMPROFON: 2× Platinum; FIMI: Platinum; IFPI SWI: Gold; RIAA: Gold; SNEP: Platinum	Non-album singles
"Lo Vas a Olvidar" (with Billie Eilish)	2021	15	100	78	74	—	12	10	62	3	18	PROMUSICAE: Gold; AMPROFON: Gold	Euphoria
"La Noche de Anoche" (with Bad Bunny)	2021	1	3	—	—	—	118	41	53	2	7	PROMUSICAE: 6× Platinum; AFP: Gold; FIMI: Gold	El Último Tour Del Mundo
"Linda" (with Tokischa)	2021	22	—	—	—	—	—	—	—	34	— (Note: "Linda" did not enter the Billboard Global 200 but peaked at number 169 on the Billboard Global Excl. US chart.)	PROMUSICAE: Platinum; AMPROFON: Gold; RIAA: 2× Platinum (Latin)	Non-album single
"La Fama" (featuring the Weeknd)	2021	1	73	5	86	13	29	15	94	2	34	PROMUSICAE: 6× Platinum; AFP: Gold; AMPROFON: 2× Platinum; FIMI: Platinum; IFPI SWI: Platinum; RIAA: Platinum; SNEP: Diamond	Motomami
"Saoko"	2022	5	—	—	—	—	65	—	—	22	101	PROMUSICAE: 2× Platinum; AMPROFON: Gold	Motomami
"Chicken Teriyaki"	2022	11	—	—	—	39	97	—	—	20	72	PROMUSICAE: Platinum; AMPROFON: Gold	Motomami
"Despechá"	2022	1	2	6	32	4	3	15	63	8	6	PROMUSICAE: 13× Platinum; AFP: 5× Platinum; AMPROFON: Diamond+3× Platinum; FIMI: 2× Platinum; IFPI SWI: 2× Platinum; RIAA: Platinum; SNEP: Diamond	Motomami +
"El Pañuelo" (with Romeo Santos)	2022	7	83	—	—	—	—	—	— (Note: "El Pañuelo" did not enter the Billboard Hot 100, but peaked at number 23 on the Billboard Bubbling Under Hot 100 Singles chart.)	20	134	PROMUSICAE: 2× Platinum; AMPROFON: Gold; RIAA: 3× Platinum (Latin)	Formula, Vol. 3
"Besos Moja2" (with Wisin & Yandel)	2022	6	6	—	—	—	—	—	—	30	102	PROMUSICAE: 4× Platinum; AMPROFON: 2× Platinum+Gold; RIAA: Gold (Latin)	La Última Misión
"LLYLM"	2023	4	86	34	74	—	48	32	—	22	66	PROMUSICAE: 3× Platinum; FIMI: Gold; SNEP: Platinum	Non-album single
"Beso" (with Rauw Alejandro)	2023	1	11	7	23	16	3	3	52	4	10	PROMUSICAE: 8× Platinum; AFP: 3× Platinum; AMPROFON: 4× Platinum+Gold; FIMI: 2× Platinum; IFPI SWI: Gold; RIAA: Platinum; SNEP: Diamond	RR
"Tuya"	2023	10	62	170	—	—	53	29	—	38	139	PROMUSICAE: Platinum	Non-album singles
"Omega" (featuring Ralphie Choo)	2024	8	—	—	—	—	—	—	—	—	—	PROMUSICAE: Gold	Non-album singles
"Berghain" (with Björk and Yves Tumor)	2025	1	25	32	20	—	4	3	— (Note: "Berghain" did not enter the Billboard Hot 100, but peaked at number 3 on the Billboard Bubbling Under Hot 100 chart.)	—	15	PROMUSICAE: Platinum; AFP: Gold; AMPROFON: Gold; IFPI SWI: Gold; SNEP: Gold	Lux
"La Perla" (with Yahritza y su Esencia)	2025	1	1	75	32	15	7	7	82	3	12	PROMUSICAE: 4× Platinum; AFP: Platinum; AMPROFON: 2× Platinum+Gold; SNEP: Gold	Lux
"Sauvignon Blanc"	2026	14	—	—	—	—	22	—	—	28	190	PROMUSICAE: Gold	Lux
"Focu 'Ranni"	2026	20	—	—	—	—	93	—	—	—	—		Lux
"Where Is Gone?" (with Fontaines D.C.)	2026	66	—	—	—	—	26	—	—	—	—		Dopamine Chamber
"—" denotes a title that was not released or did not chart in that territory. "*" indicates a chart that did not exist at the time.

=== As featured artist ===
List of singles as a featured artist, showing year released, selected chart positions, certifications, and originating album
Title	Year	Peak chart positions										Certifications	Album
Title	Year	SPA	ARG	ITA	MEX	POR	SWI	UK	US	US Latin	WW	Certifications	Album
"Antes de Morirme" (C. Tangana featuring Rosalía)	2016	26	—	—	—	—	—	—	—	—	—	PROMUSICAE: 7× Platinum	Non-album single
"Barefoot in the Park" (James Blake featuring Rosalía)	2019	40	—	—	—	99	—	—	— (Note: "Barefoot in the Park" did not enter the Billboard Hot 100, but peaked at number 27 on the US Hot Dance/Electronic Songs chart.)	—	—	PROMUSICAE: Gold	Assume Form
"Highest in the Room" (remix) (Travis Scott featuring Rosalía and Lil Baby)	2019	19	—	15	—	—	—	—	—	—	—	PROMUSICAE: Gold; AMPROFON: Platinum	JackBoys
"KLK" (Arca featuring Rosalía)	2020	—	—	—	—	—	—	—	—	—	—		Kick I
"Relación" (remix) (Sech, Daddy Yankee and J Balvin featuring Rosalía and Farruko)	2020	2	3	73	1	—	47	—	64	2	13	PROMUSICAE: 3× Platinum	Non-album singles
"Oral" (Björk featuring Rosalía)	2023	—	—	—	—	—	—	— (Note: "Oral" did not enter the UK Official Singles Chart, but peaked at number 53 on the UK Singles Downloads Chart.)	— (Note: "Oral" did not enter the Billboard Hot 100, but peaked at number 42 on the US Hot Dance/Electronic Songs chart.)	—	—		Non-album singles
"New Woman" (Lisa featuring Rosalía)	2024	12	88	—	— (Note: "New Woman" did not enter the Billboard Mexico Songs chart, but peaked at number five on the Monitor Latino Mexico Anglo Songs chart.)	55	62	55	97	—	15	PROMUSICAE: Gold; AMPROFON: Gold; RIAA: Gold	Alter Ego
"—" denotes a recording that did not chart or was not released in that territory.

=== Promotional singles ===
List of promotional singles, showing year released, selected chart positions, certifications, and originating album
Title	Year	Peak chart positions							Certifications	Album
Title	Year	SPA	ARG	MEX	POR	SWI	US Latin	WW	Certifications	Album
"Dolerme"	2020	11	—	— (Note: "Dolerme" did not enter the Billboard Mexico Airplay chart, but peaked at number 19 on the Billboard Mexico Espanol Airplay chart.)	—	—	—	—	PROMUSICAE: Platinum; AMPROFON: Gold	Non-album promotional singles
"Blinding Lights" (remix) (The Weeknd featuring Rosalía)	2020	—	—	—	—	—	—	—		Non-album promotional singles
"Hentai"	2022	7	—	—	110	—	—	— (Note: "Hentai" did not enter the Billboard Global 200 but peaked at number 168 on the Billboard Global Excl. US chart.)	PROMUSICAE: Gold	Motomami
"Candy"	2022	1	94	10	97	83	20	72	PROMUSICAE: 2× Platinum; AMPROFON: Gold	Motomami
"—" denotes a recording that did not chart or was not released in that territory.

== Other charted songs ==
List of other charted songs, showing year released, selected chart positions, certifications, and originating album
Title	Year	Peak chart positions										Certifications	Album
Title	Year	SPA	ARG	FRA	ITA	POR	SWI	UK	US	US Latin	WW	Certifications	Album
"Brillo" (with J Balvin)	2018	18	—	—	—	—	—	—	—	—	—	PROMUSICAE: 2× Platinum	Vibras
"Que no salga la luna"	2018	15	—	—	—	—	—	—	—	—	—	PROMUSICAE: Gold	El Mal Querer
"Reniego"	2018	36	—	—	—	—	—	—	—	—	—		El Mal Querer
"Preso"	2018	48	—	—	—	—	—	—	—	—	—		El Mal Querer
"Nana"	2018	26	—	—	—	—	—	—	—	—	—		El Mal Querer
"Maldición"	2018	30	—	—	—	—	—	—	—	—	—		El Mal Querer
"A ningún hombre"	2018	35	—	—	—	—	—	—	—	—	—	PROMUSICAE: Gold	El Mal Querer
"Me Traicionaste" (with A. Chal)	2019	70	—	—	—	—	—	—	—	—	—		For the Throne
"Dios nos libre del dinero"	2019	24	—	—	—	—	—	—	—	—	—	PROMUSICAE: Gold	Fucking Money Man
"Bulerías"	2022	16	—	—	—	178	—	—	—	—	—	PROMUSICAE: Gold	Motomami
"Bizcochito"	2022	13	—	—	—	163	—	—	—	— (Note: "Bizcochito" did not enter the US Hot Latin Songs chart but peaked at number 16 on the Latin Digital Song Sales chart.)	— (Note: "Bizcochito" did not enter the Billboard Global 200 but peaked at number 187 on the Billboard Global Excl. US chart.)	PROMUSICAE: 2× Platinum; AMPROFON: Platinum+Gold	Motomami
"G3 N15"	2022	15	—	—	—	—	—	—	—	—	—	PROMUSICAE: Gold	Motomami
"Motomami"	2022	20	—	—	—	—	—	—	—	—	—	PROMUSICAE: Gold; AMPROFON: Gold	Motomami
"Diablo"	2022	19	—	—	—	184	—	—	—	—	—	PROMUSICAE: Gold	Motomami
"Delirio de Grandeza"	2022	25	—	—	—	—	—	—	—	—	—		Motomami
"Cuuuuuuuuuute"	2022	24	—	—	—	—	—	—	—	—	—		Motomami
"Como un G"	2022	18	—	—	—	—	—	—	—	—	—	PROMUSICAE: Platinum	Motomami
"Abcdefg"	2022	36	—	—	—	—	—	—	—	—	—		Motomami
"La Combi Versace" (featuring Tokischa)	2022	12	—	—	—	189	—	—	—	—	—	PROMUSICAE: Platinum	Motomami
"Sakura"	2022	28	—	—	—	—	—	—	—	—	—		Motomami
"Chiri"	2022	44	—	—	—	—	—	—	—	—	—		Motomami +
"Aislamiento"	2022	100	—	—	—	—	—	—	—	—	—		Motomami +
"Vampiros" (with Rauw Alejandro)	2023	7	—	—	—	100	75	—	—	32	163	PROMUSICAE: Platinum	RR
"Promesa" (with Rauw Alejandro)	2023	20	—	—	—	—	—	—	—	— (Note: "Promesa" did not enter the US Hot Latin Songs chart but peaked at number six on the Latin Digital Song Sales chart.)	—	PROMUSICAE: Gold	RR
"Sexo, Violencia y Llantas"	2025	4	41	78	76	8	—	—	—	13	43	PROMUSICAE: Platinum; AFP: Gold	Lux
"Reliquia"	2025	2	23	74	52	5	10	56	— (Note: "Reliquia" did not enter the Billboard Hot 100, but peaked at number 10 on the Billboard Bubbling Under Hot 100 chart.)	10	29	PROMUSICAE: Platinum; AFP: Gold	Lux
"Divinize"	2025	6	85	102	92	11	—	—	—	—	57	PROMUSICAE: Gold	Lux
"Porcelana"	2025	8	89	123	—	12	—	—	—	15	76	PROMUSICAE: Gold	Lux
"Mio Cristo Piange Diamanti"	2025	11	—	142	54	14	—	—	—	—	109	PROMUSICAE: Gold	Lux
"Mundo Nuevo"	2025	13	—	188	—	18	—	—	—	26	149	PROMUSICAE: Gold	Lux
"De Madrugá"	2025	12	—	169	—	17	—	—	—	25	129	PROMUSICAE: Gold	Lux
"Dios Es Un Stalker"	2025	7	73	164	—	15	—	—	—	17	90	PROMUSICAE: Platinum	Lux
"La Yugular"	2025	10	—	185	—	16	—	—	—	23	123	PROMUSICAE: Gold	Lux
"La Rumba Del Perdón" (with Estrella Morente and Sílvia Pérez Cruz)	2025	9	—	—	—	24	—	—	—	30	177	PROMUSICAE: Gold	Lux
"Memória" (with Carminho)	2025	17	—	—	—	2	—	—	—	—	— (Note: "Memória" did not enter the Billboard Global 200 but peaked at number 185 on the Billboard Global Excl. US chart.)	PROMUSICAE: Gold; AFP: Gold	Lux
"Magnolias"	2025	15	—	—	—	13	—	—	—	36	— (Note: "Magnolias" did not enter the Billboard Global 200 but peaked at number 137 on the Billboard Global Excl. US chart.)	PROMUSICAE: Gold	Lux
"—" denotes a recording that did not chart or was not released in that territory.

== Guest appearances ==
List of non-single guest appearances, showing year released, other artist(s), and album name
Title	Year	Other artist(s)	Album
"Un millón de veces"	2015	n/a	Tres Guitarras Para El Autismo
"Con la Peña"	2017	Cálido Lehamo	Alegría de Vivir
"Un Largo Viaje"	2018	Fernando Vacas, The Royal Gypsy Orchestra and Vallellano	A Través de la Luz
"Brillo"	2018	J Balvin	Vibras
"En Mí (Interlude)" (Uncredited)	2018	J Balvin	Vibras
"¡Ay Paquita!"	2018	n/a	Non-album single
"Catalina en Gran Vía"	2018	Raül Refree, Fermin Muguruza	Black is Beltza
"Cuando Te Beso (En Vivo)"	2018	Niña Pastori	Realmente Volando (En Vivo)
"Suncity" (Uncredited)	2018	Khalid, Empress Of	Suncity
"Me Traicionaste"	2019	A. Chal	For the Throne
"Dile a Él" (Uncredited)	2020	Rauw Alejandro	Afrodisíaco
"Strawberry Kiwi" (Uncredited)	2020	Rauw Alejandro	Afrodisíaco
"Nothing's Special"	2021	Oneohtrix Point Never	Magic Oneohtrix Point Never (Blu-ray Edition)
"Trademark USA" (Uncredited)	2021	Baby Keem	The Melodic Blue
"Seguiriya Madre"	2022	Niño de Elche	Flamenco: Mausoleo de Celebración, Amor y Muerte
"Corazón Despeinado" (Uncredited)	2022	Rauw Alejandro	Saturno
"Normal" (Uncredited)	2024	Carolina Durante	Elige Tu Propia Aventura

== Voice sampled in ==
Sampled In	Year	By Artist(s)	Album	Vocal performance sampled	From the Album
"Rosalía"	2018	Yung Beef	ADROMICFMS 4	"De Plata"	Los Ángeles
"Angel"	2020	Rojuu	OOO	"Bagdad"	El Mal Querer
"Aquel Nap ZzZz"	2021	Rauw Alejandro	Vice Versa	"Amor Genuino" (Live)	n/a

== Music videos ==
Year	Song	Other artist(s)	Director	Filming location(s)
2016	"Antes de morirme"	C. Tangana	Manson	Barcelona
2017	"Catalina"	None	Txema Yeste	Barcelona
2017	"De Plata"	None	Manson	Los Angeles
2017	"Aunque es de noche"	None	Ignasi Monreal	Sant Esteve Sesrovires
2018	"Malamente (Cap.1: Augurio)"	None	Canada	Barcelona; Badalona; Barberà del Vallès; Hospitalet de Llobregat
2018	"Pienso en Tu Mirá (Cap.3: Celos)"	None	Canada	Barcelona; Badalona; Barberà del Vallès; Hospitalet de Llobregat
2018	"Di mi nombre (Cap.8: Éxtasis)"	None	Henry Scholfield	Madrid
2018	"Bagdad (Cap.7: Liturgia)"	None	Helmi	Paris
2019	"De Aquí No Sales (Cap.4: Disputa)"	None	Diana Kunst, Mau Morgo	Campo de Criptana
2019	"Con Altura"	J Balvin, el Guincho	Director X	Miami
2019	"Barefoot in the Park"	James Blake	Diana Kunst, Mau Morgó	Unknown
2019	"Aute Cuture"	None	Bradley & Pablo	Unknown
2019	"Milionària" + "Dios Nos Libre del Dinero"	None	Tàmara Farré	Barcelona
2019	"Yo x Ti, Tú x Mí"	Ozuna	RJ Sanchez, Pasqual Gutierrez	Miami
2019	"A Palé"	None	Jora Frantzis	Los Angeles
2020	"Juro Qué"	None	Tanu Muino	Barcelona
2020	"TKN"	Travis Scott	Canada	North Hollywood; Pomona
2020	"Relación" (remix)	Sech, Daddy Yankee, J Balvin, Farruko	Fernando Lugo	San Juan
2021	"Lo Vas a Olvidar"	Billie Eilish	Nabil	Los Angeles
2021	"La Noche De Anoche"	Bad Bunny	Stillz	Unknown
2021	"Linda"	Tokischa	Raymi Paulus	Santo Domingo
2021	"La Fama"	The Weeknd	Director X	Los Angeles
2022	"Saoko"	None	Valentin Petit	Kyiv
2022	"Chicken Teriyaki"	None	Tanu Muino	Madrid
2022	"Hentai"	None	Mitch Ryan	Ukraine
2022	"Candy"	None	Stillz	Shibuya
2022	"Motomami"	None	Daniel Sannwald	Los Angeles
2022	"Delirio de Grandeza"	None	Mitch Ryan	Connecticut
2022	"Despechá"	None	Mitch Ryan	Mallorca
2022	"El Pañuelo"	Romeo Santos	Roger Guàrdia	Los Angeles
2022	"Besos Moja2"	Wisin & Yandel	Christine Yuan	Unknown
2023	"Beso"	Rauw Alejandro	Unknown	Various
2023	"Vampiros"	Rauw Alejandro	Stillz	Barcelona
2023	"Tuya"	None	Stillz	Tokyo
2023	"Oral"	Björk	Carlota Guerrero	El Prat de Llobregat
2024	"New Woman"	Lisa	Dave Meyers	Los Angeles
2024	"Omega"	Ralphie Choo	Stillz	Los Angeles
2025	"Berghain"	None	Nicolás Méndez	Warsaw
2025	"La Perla"	None	Stillz	Miami
2026	"Sauvignon Blanc	None	Noah Dillon	Unknown
2026	"Focu 'Ranni"	None	Petra Collins	Unknown

=== Cameos and guest appearances ===
Year	Song	Artist(s)	Director	Notes
2019	"Adore You"	Harry Styles	Dave Meyers	Narration
2020	"WAP"	Cardi B & Megan Thee Stallion	Colin Tilley	Cameo

== Songwriting credits ==
Year	Song	Artist
2016	"Llámame Más Tarde"	C. Tangana
2019	"Highest in the Room"	Travis Scott
2019	"Llama"	Ana Torroja
2020	"Goteo"	Paloma Mami
2020	"KLK"	Arca
2020	"Dile a Él"	Rauw Alejandro
2020	"Strawberry Kiwi"	Rauw Alejandro
2021	"Mil Razones"	Ana Torroja
2022	"Caprichoso"	Rauw Alejandro
2024	"I Had a Heart"	Sia
2024	"I'll Go Anywhere"	Mustafa

== Footnotes ==
Notes for peak chart positions
