= Charm La'Donna =

American dancer and choreographer (born 1988)

- Born: Charmaine La'Donna Jordan; May 14, 1988 (age 38); Compton, California, U.S.
- Education: Los Angeles County High School for the Arts
- Alma mater: University of California, Los Angeles (BA)
- Occupations: Dancer; choreographer; creative director; artist
- Years active: 2006–present
- Musical career
- Genres: Hip hop; R&B
- Instrument: Vocals
- Label: Epic
- Website: charmladonna.com

Charmaine La'Donna Jordan (born May 14, 1988), known professionally as Charm La'Donna, is an American dancer and choreographer. Known for her work with various recording artists, her accolades include a Primetime Emmy Award and two MTV Video Music Awards.

== Early life and education ==
Charmaine La'Donna Jordan on May 14, 1988, in Compton, California. She was raised by her mother Debbie, whom she credits alongside her grandmother and "the village of women in Compton, all connected by blood, friendship or simply proximity" for her success. Jordan's older brother, Yki, is a rapper and songwriter who inspired her to pursue a recording career of her own. She suspended those aspirations after he was arrested and sentenced for 75 years to life in prison.

When she was three years old, Jordan told her mother that she wanted to become a dancer. She was enrolled in a local recreational center that offered dance activities before its counselors referred her to Regina's School of the Arts, where she trained before moving to Miss Monica's Dance School. At age ten, during an audition for a music video, Jordan was introduced to Fatima Robinson, who later became her mentor. Jordan attended the Los Angeles County High School for the Arts (LACSHA), where she graduated in 2006. She holds a Bachelor of Arts in world arts and culture from the University of California, Los Angeles (UCLA).

== Career ==
During her senior year at LACSHA, La'Donna was hired by singer Madonna as a backup dancer for her Confessions Tour. Following the tour, she worked as Robinson's assistant choreographer, working on various music videos, television specials and Super Bowl halftime shows under her direction while attending UCLA full-time. Her work with Robinson introduced her to fellow Compton native, rapper Kendrick Lamar, while co-choreographing his performance at the 2015 BET Awards. He recruited her in 2017 as the choreographer and sole female dancer for his DAMN. Tour and choreographed and danced in his opening performance at the 60th Annual Grammy Awards in 2018.

La'Donna continued to gain recognition by choreographing music videos and live performances for singers Rosalía, Selena Gomez, Dua Lipa and Meghan Trainor. Her work in the music video for Rosalía, J Balvin and El Guincho's "Con Altura" won her the MTV Video Music Award for Best Choreography. La'Donna's music aspirations resumed in 2020. She signed a recording contract with Epic Records in February and released her first two singles "So & So" and "Westside". After choreographing the Weeknd's Super Bowl LV halftime show, she released her debut extended play, La'Donna, on April 9, 2021.

== Filmography ==
=== Film ===
Year	Title	Role	Notes	Ref.
2012	Sparkle	Sparkle's Backup Singer #2	Credited as Charmaine Jordan	
2019	There Once Was a Woman	Chickadee		

=== Television ===
Year	Title	Role	Notes	Ref.
2010	Barbie in A Mermaid Tale	Choreographer	Credited as Charmaine Jordan; also motion capture dancer	
2013	CeeLo Green is Loberace	Choreographer	Credited as Charmaine Jordan; also creative director	
2015	The Wiz Live!	Ensemble	Credited as Charmaine Jordan; also assistant choreographer	
2016	Dance Camp	Assistant choreographer	Credited as Charmaine Jordan	
2016	The Oscars	Assistant choreographer	Television special	
2019	Generations	Choreographer	Episode: "Flamenco"	
2020	Graduate Together: America Honors the High School Class of 2020	Choreographer	Television special	
2021	The Pepsi Super Bowl LV Halftime Show	Choreographer	Television special	
2022	The Oscars	Choreographer	Television special	
2024	The Perfect Couple	Choreographer	Opening dance sequence	
2026	Apple Music Super Bowl LX Halftime Show	Choreographer	Television special	

=== Music videos ===
==== As lead artist ====
Title	Year	Director
"Westside"	2020	Charm La'Donna; Emil Nava
"Queen"	2021	Charm La'Donna; Emil Nava
"Palm Trees"	2021	Charm La'Donna; Emil Nava

==== As choreographer ====
Title	Artist(s)	Year	Director
"All About That Bass"	Meghan Trainor	2014	Fatima Robinson
"Slumber Party"	Britney Spears; Tinashe	2016	Colin Tilley
"Malamente"	Rosalía	2018	Canada
"Let You Be Right"	Meghan Trainor	2018	Colin Tilley
"Pienso en tu mirá"	Rosalía	2018	Canada
"Di mi nombre"	Rosalía	2018	Henry Scholfield
"De aquí no sales"	Rosalía	2019	Diana Kunst; Mau Morgó
"Con altura"	Rosalía; J Balvin; El Guincho	2019	Director X
"Aute Cuture"	Rosalía	2019	Bradley Bell; Pablo Jones-Soler
"Look at Her Now"	Selena Gomez	2019	Sophie Muller
"Wave"	Meghan Trainor; Mike Sabath	2019	Mathew Cullen
"Physical"	Dua Lipa	2020	Canada
"Break My Heart"	Dua Lipa	2020	Henry Scholfield
"Make You Dance"	Meghan Trainor	2020	The Reggies
"Levitating"	Dua Lipa; DaBaby	2020	Warren Fu
"The Motto (Part II)"	Tiësto; Ava Max	2022	Charm La'Donna
"Rich Spirit"	Kendrick Lamar	2022	Calmatic
"Count Me Out"	Kendrick Lamar	2022	Dave Free; Kendrick Lamar
"Mother"	Meghan Trainor	2023	Charm La'Donna
"Dance the Night"	Dua Lipa	2023	Greta Gerwig
"Not Like Us"	Kendrick Lamar	2024	Dave Free; Kendrick Lamar
"Squabble Up"	Kendrick Lamar	2024	Calmatic
"Shimmer"	Meghan Trainor	2026	Charm La'Donna

== Discography ==
=== Extended plays (EP) ===
- La'Donna (2021)

== Awards and nominations ==
Award	Year (Note: Indicates the year of ceremony. Each year is linked to the article about the awards held that year, wherever possible.)	Category	Recipient(s)	Result	Ref.
Hollywood Music Video Awards	2025	Choreographer of the Year	Herself	Nominated	
iHeartRadio Music Awards	2021	Favorite Music Video Choreography	"Physical"	Nominated	
MTV Video Music Awards	2019	Best Choreography	"Con Altura"	Won	
MTV Video Music Awards	2020	Best Choreography	"Physical"	Nominated	
MTV Video Music Awards	2023	Best Choreography	"Dance the Night"	Nominated	
MTV Video Music Awards	2024	Best Choreography	"Houdini"	Won	
MTV Video Music Awards	2025	Best Choreography	"Not Like Us"	Nominated	
Primetime Creative Arts Emmy Awards	2025	Outstanding Choreography for Variety or Reality Programming	The Apple Music Super Bowl LIX Halftime Show Starring Kendrick Lamar	Nominated	
Primetime Creative Arts Emmy Awards	2025	Outstanding Choreography for Variety or Reality Programming	Beyoncé Bowl (Note: Shared with Truck Patterson, Christopher Grant, and Parris Goebel)	Nominated	
Primetime Creative Arts Emmy Awards	2026	Outstanding Choreography for Variety or Reality Programming	The Apple Music Superbowl LX Halftime Show Starring Bad Bunny	Won	
