= Juro Que =

2020 single by Rosalía

Single by Rosalía
- Language: Spanish
- English title: "I Swear That"
- Released: January 23, 2020
- Recorded: January 2019
- Genre: Flamenco pop
- Length: 2:50
- Label: Columbia
- Songwriters: Rosalía Vila; Pablo Díaz-Reixa; Daniel Gómez
- Producers: El Guincho; Rosalia

Rosalía singles chronology
"Highest in the Room" (remix) (2020)	"Juro Que" (2020)	"TKN" (2020)

Music video
- "Juro Que" on YouTube

"Juro Que" is a song by Spanish singer Rosalía. It was released by Columbia Records on January 23, 2020. The song talks about the imprisonment of a lover. "Juro Que" brings Rosalía back to her flamenco fusion days thanks to the presence of a Spanish guitar, aggressive guitar chords and minimal production. It was performed in a shortened version at the 62nd Grammy Awards.

== Background ==
On January 22, 2020, Rosalía posted a picture with Spanish Élite star Omar Ayuso on her respective social media profiles with the caption "Juro que". The day after, the singer posted a video of her listening to the song on her Instagram Stories. A couple hours after it, she announced that the song would be released on streaming platforms that same day. An hour before the official release, "Juro Que" leaked on Shazam and Apple Music.

== Critical reception ==
Writing for Los 40, Laura Coca made the following statement about the song: "the Spanish guitar and palmas share protagonism with the imposing voice of Rosalía. There's a lot of sentiment in every note. Embracing old melodies similar to the ones used in 'Que No Salga la Luna' and 'Di Mi Nombre', I am sure that this new single of her will become another chart-topper single".

== Music video ==
The music video for "Juro Que" was uploaded to YouTube on January 23, 2020. It stars Rosalía and actor Omar Ayuso. Rosalía plays the role of a woman whose lover has been imprisoned for over four hundred days. She promises loyalty to him and that she'll do whatever is in her hands to free him. The whole video consists of both of them interacting during a tête-à-tête. The video was directed by Tanu Muino and produced by Montse Urniza. It was filmed in Barcelona in fall 2019.

It received over 5 million views on YouTube in 24 hours.

== Connection with El mal querer ==
The song as well as its music video could be related to the singer's 2018 project El mal querer. The album illustrates and tells the story of Flamenca, the main character of the Romance of Flamenca, a 13th-century Occitan novel. In the novel, Flamenca marries her all-time lover. Her husband is very jealous of her and is afraid that another man gets interested in his wife. His worst dreams come true since Flamenca begins a relationship with another man because she feels imprisoned and cautive in her relationship with her husband. When the husband finds it out, he locks her up in a tower for the rest of her life. In the end, Flamenca gets liberated and kills her husband. When the police asks for the responsible, Flamenca's lover turns himself in and accepts the charges even though he isn't the guilty. El mal querer was released on November 2, 2018. It has been 447 days since its release. This connects with the first lyric of the song which says: "my man has been imprisoned for more than 400 days". Thus, this song could be a follow to her 2018 project; a song that continues Flamenca's story.

== Personnel ==
Credits adapted from Tidal

- Recording and production
- Rosalía Vila – vocals, songwriting, production, arrangement
- Pablo Díaz-Reixa – production, arrangement, recording engineering
- Daniel Gómez – songwriting
- José David Acedo Morales – arrangement
- DJ Riggins – assistant engineering
- Jacob Richards – assistant engineering
- Mike Seaberg – assistant engineering
- Chris Athens – master engineering
- Jaycen Joshua – mixing engineering
- Morning Estrada – recording engineering
- Additional musicians
- Ane Jesús Carrasco Molina – choir vocal, clapping
- Anna Colom – choir vocal
- Claudia Gómez – choir vocal
- Jose Alvaro Ibañez – choir vocal, clapping
- José Manuel Fernandez (Tobalo) – choir vocal, clapping
- Juan Carlos Gil – choir vocal, clapping
- Macario Ibañez – choir vocal, clapping
- Miguel Tellez – choir vocal, clapping
- Joselito Acedo – guitar

== Charts ==
Chart (2020)	Peak position
Spain (PROMUSICAE)	7
US Hot Latin Songs (Billboard)	41

== Release history ==
Region	Date	Format	Label	Ref.
Various	23 January 2020	Digital download; streaming	Columbia	
