= Bagdad (song) =

Single by Rosalía

from the album El mal querer
- Language: Spanish
- Released: 4 December 2018
- Studio: El Guincho Studio (Barcelona)
- Genre: New flamenco; R&B
- Length: 3:03
- Label: Columbia
- Songwriters: Rosalía Vila; Pablo Díaz-Reixa; Antón Álvarez; Luis Troquel; Leticia Sala; Justin Timberlake; Timothy Mosley; Scott Storch
- Producers: El Guincho; Rosalía

Rosalía singles chronology
"Di mi nombre" (2018)	"Bagdad" (2018)	"De aquí no sales" (2019)

Music video
- "Bagdad" on YouTube

"Bagdad" is a song by Spanish singer Rosalía. It was released on 4 December 2018 by Columbia Records as the fourth single from her second studio album, El mal querer (2018).

Inspired by the Barcelonian erotic club of the same name, lyrically "Bagdad" talks about a woman's loneliness. It was written by Antón Álvarez, Leticia Sala, Luís Troquel and Rosalía, with production handled by El Guincho and co-produced by Rosalía herself. It contains an interpolation of Justin Timberlake's "Cry Me a River" and a choral participation by the Orfeó Català as well as arrangements by Joan Albert Amargós.

== Background ==
In an interview with Beats 1, Rosalía said she was inspired by an erotic club in Barcelona called Bagdad and by Timberlake's "Cry Me a River": "He heard the song and said, "Yes, you can use the melody"; I was so excited because he never approves anything."

In this song, Rosalía represents a woman drowned by her anguish and grief due to a bad love. The woman does nothing to prevent it, but flooded by her own tears she finds salvation. The liturgy, a worship ceremony, ends with a rebirth. The song's lyrics, part of a narrative arc that spans the whole album, revolve around the main character of the story being seen alone crying in the streets at night, clapping her hands in sorrow "like she's praying to the rhythm of bulerías", and then being rescued by a "fallen angel".

== Music video ==
The music video for "Bagdad", directed by Helmi, was filmed in Paris and released on 4 December 2018 on YouTube. It features Rosalía as a strip-club dancer, dancing in a pole wearing a blonde wig and a red latex mono similar to the one Britney Spears used in the music video for "Oops!... I Did It Again" in 2000. She goes to the place's bathroom after having a heated up phone conversation, where she starts crying to the point that the water from her tears fills up the whole room, drowning her. The singer tweeted that the music video is "For all those who were heartbroken and drowned in their sorrow." A portion of an unreleased track "Lo Presiento", initially intended for El Mal Querer, can be spotted at the beginning of the video.

== Charts ==
Weekly chart performance for "Bagdad"
Chart (2020)	Peak position
Spain (Promusicae)	7

== Certifications ==
Region	Certification	Certified units/sales
Mexico (AMPROFON)	Platinum	60,000^{‡}
Spain (Promusicae)	Platinum	40,000^{‡}
^{‡} Sales+streaming figures based on certification alone.
