= Physical (Dua Lipa song) =

2020 single by Dua Lipa

Single by Dua Lipa

from the album Future Nostalgia
- Released: 31 January 2020
- Recorded: 8 November 2018
- Studio: TaP (London); The Bunker at 13 (London); RAK (London); Modulator (Toronto)
- Genre: Power pop; synth-pop; dance-pop
- Length: 3:13
- Label: Warner
- Songwriters: Dua Lipa; Jason Evigan; Clarence Coffee Jr.; Sarah Hudson
- Producers: Jason Evigan; Koz

Dua Lipa singles chronology
"Don't Start Now" (2019)	"Physical" (2020)	"Sugar (remix)" (2020)

Music video
- "Physical" on YouTube

"Physical" is a song by English singer Dua Lipa from her second studio album, Future Nostalgia (2020). Lipa wrote the song with Jason Evigan, Clarence Coffee Jr. and Sarah Hudson, taking inspiration from 1980s music and the 1983 film Flashdance. It was produced by Evigan and Koz, and stemmed from a Persian flute synth sample that was played by the former. An uptempo power pop, synth-pop and dance-pop song, the song features a chugging synth bassline, drums and various percussion instruments. Lipa uses a spoken word, belting and chanting vocal delivery. The lyrics describe the honeymoon phase of a relationship and the importance of trusting one's instincts.

"Physical" was released through Warner Records for digital download and streaming as the album's second single on 31 January 2020. It was met with acclaim from music critics. Critics viewed the high energy of the song and Lipa's vocals as uniquely reinterpreting the 1980s era. It was nominated for Song of the Year at the 2021 Brit Awards and appeared on numerous 2020 year-end lists, including ones published by Billboard, The Guardian and NME. The song reached number one in Bulgaria, Croatia, Israel, Lebanon, Slovakia and Poland, and peaked in the top 10 of 17 additional countries, including the UK Singles Chart, where it peaked at number three, becoming Lipa's eighth UK top 10 single. The song is certified gold or higher in sixteen countries including diamond in France and Poland and triple platinum in the UK.

The accompanying high concept music video was directed by Spanish production team Canada, and is based on a Venn diagram by Swiss artist duo Peter Fischli and David Weiss from their series of works, Order and Cleanliness (1981). The video shows Lipa dancing in various coloured warehouse stage sets and features anime-inspired animation. The music video received praise from critics for its high-concept nature and rejection of heteronormativity. The video received numerous accolades, including Best Visual Effects at the 2020 MTV Video Music Awards. Further promotion came from the release of a 1980s-inspired workout video, in which Lipa is an aerobics class instructor as well as numerous remixes, including one featuring Hwasa as well as one by Mark Ronson featuring Gwen Stefani that appears on Lipa and the Blessed Madonna's remix album Club Future Nostalgia (2020). Lipa performed the song on numerous occasions, including at the 2021 Brit Awards, 2020 LOS40 Music Awards and 2020 NRJ Music Awards.

== Writing and production ==
"Physical" was written by Lipa, Clarence Coffee Jr., Sarah Hudson, and its producer Jason Evigan. The song was inspired by 1980s music and the 1983 film Flashdance. It was created at Evigan's home studio in Tarzana, Los Angeles, where Hudson used a tarot card reading as an icebreaker for the session. Lipa wanted the track to be fun, upbeat, and unique from what was played by radio stations at the time, and she suggested the use of world music instruments. "Physical" thus started with a Persian flute sample Evigan played. Koz later fine-tuned the production, filtering down the volume of the flute sample, which was nearly excluded according to Evigan. Coffee Jr. and Hudson recorded backing vocals with Lipa, simultaneously in the same booth.

Lipa described the writing process as a puzzle of collaborative ideas being put together, which Hudson noted down in all caps. Lyrics such as, "You got me feeling diamond rich / Nothing on this planet compares to it", were written with inspiration from the 1980s era. Lipa came up with the bridge melody when experimenting with a bedroom microphone. The "Let's get physical" line in the chorus of "Physical" is also used in Olivia Newton-John's 1981 song of the same name. However, the former was not based on it, although Lipa acknowledged afterwards that there is "definitely a nod" to the song. According to her, "Physical" was a "spur-of-the-moment kind of song, which at times had a Eurythmics vibe to it". The song was recorded at London's the Bunker at 13 and RAK Studios as well as Modulator Music in Toronto; the vocals were recorded at TaP Studio in London. Matty Green mixed the song at Studio 55 in Los Angeles and Chris Gehringer mastered it at Sterling Sound in Edgewater, New Jersey.

== Music and lyrics ==
"Physical"
Set to techno and disco beats, "Physical" is a dance-pop, power pop and synth-pop song about the honeymoon phase of a relationship. The spoken-word bridge uses tapping percussion in the build-up to the belted chorus that is led by a synth flute.

Musically, "Physical" is an uptempo dance-pop, power pop and synth-pop song with dance-rock, dark wave and Italo disco elements. (Note: Sources labeling "Physical" a dance-pop song: Men's Health, Paper and The Recording Academy.; Sources labeling "Physical" a power pop song: The Arts Desk, Billboard, E! Online, Hot Press, The Face, Official Charts Company and Vogue.; Sources labeling "Physical" a synth-pop song: Billboard, E! Online, Idolator and The Korea Times.; Source noting elements of dance-rock in "Physical": Albumism.; Sources noting elements of dark wave in "Physical": E! Online, The Guardian and PopMatters.; Sources noting elements of Italo disco in "Physical": Dazed and E! Online.) The song has a length of 3:13, and is composed in 4/4 time in the key of A minor, with an energetic tempo of 147 beats per minute and a looping chord progression of Am–F–C–G, the same used in Newton-John's song of the same name. The track has a structure of verse, bridge, chorus, verse, bridge, chorus, double middle eight, double chorus. Lipa's vocals range from A_{3} to D_{5}. It has several 1980s and disco tropes in its production, which makes use of a synthwave bassline, techno and disco beats, as well as synth-pop instrumentals and grooves.

It opens with a chugging synth bassline that plays an eighth note pattern, combining two sawtooth wave synths with an analogue modelling synthesizer and a heavily processed bass guitar. The drums have a simpler, repeating kick and snare sequence, but are accented with a shaker over the beat throughout the verses and tapping percussion in the build-up to the chorus. Lipa uses a deadpan delivery in a lower vocal register prior to the song's spoken word bridge.

Prior to the chorus, a suction effect is used where the production briefly disappears before appearing again. The chorus is led by a synth flute similar to the Japanese shakuhachi instrument. The chords are introduced in this section alongside a cymbal, eighth note hi-hats, and various impact effects. Lipa belts each chorus which all end with her intensely chanting, "Come on / Let's get physical!". In the middle eight, her vocals reach a higher register, changing her pleas to commands while building to an ending crescendo. Lyrically, "Physical" is a statement of purpose where Lipa celebrates the honeymoon phase in an intoxicating and lustful relationship. She sings about trusting her instincts, sex and female empowerment, in the sense where women are not waiting for a man to save them.

== Release and promotion ==
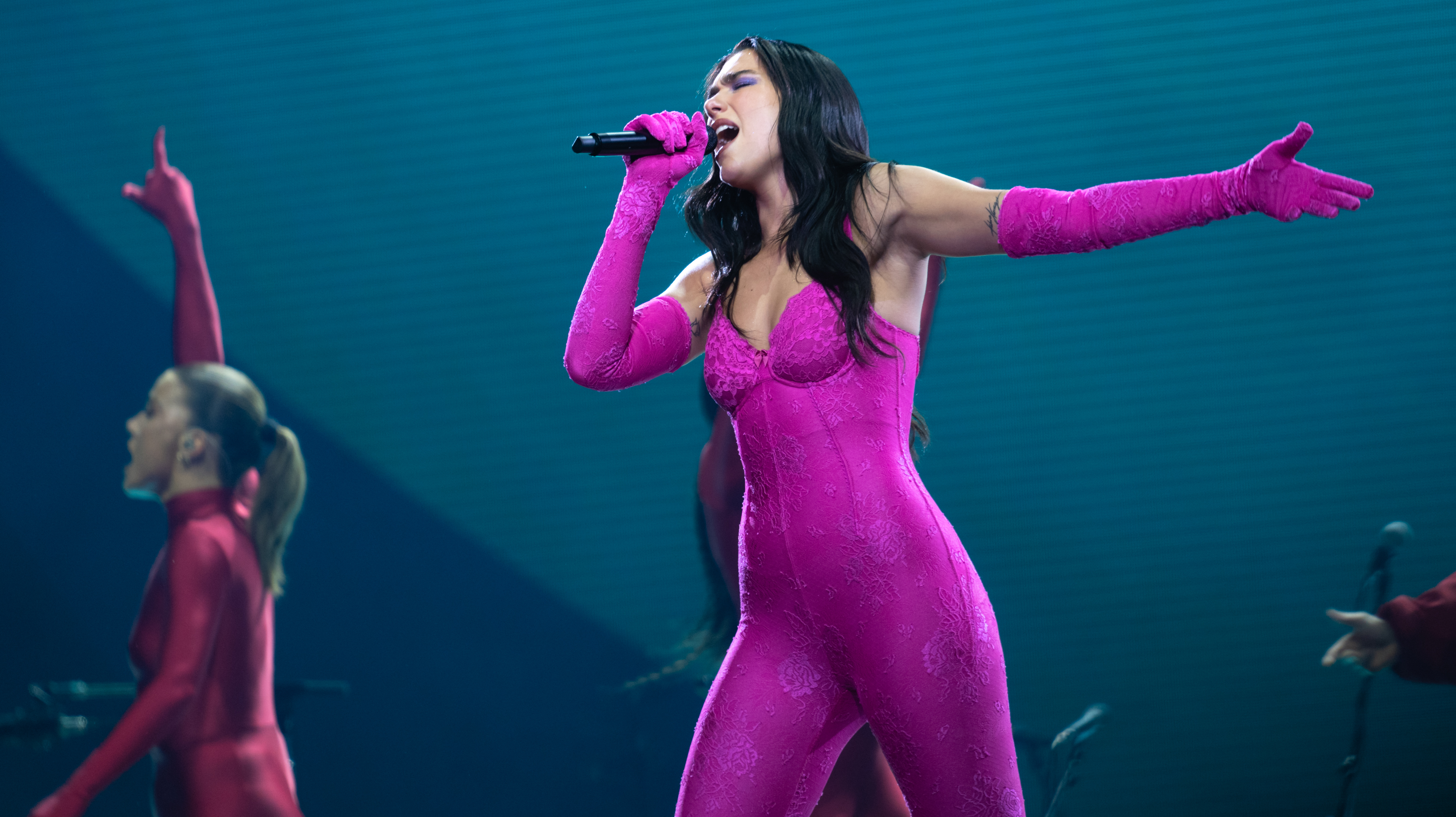
Lipa performing "Physical" on the Future Nostalgia Tour in 2022

Spotify first revealed the song's title in an advertisement for Future Nostalgia on 6 January 2020. On 22 and 23 January 2020, Lipa shared teaser images captioned with lyrics from "Physical" on social media. The single's cover art was shared on 24 January of that year and shows Lipa contortedly posing in a dress that has contrasting coloured animal print. On 28 January 2020, Lipa shared a teaser video on social media, featuring a 19-second snippet of the track. "Physical" was released for digital download and streaming as the album's second single on 30 January 2020. The song was sent for radio airplay in Italy on 14 February 2020.

Lipa delivered her first live performance of "Physical" on 29 February 2020 at the Sydney Gay and Lesbian Mardi Gras. A vertical video for the song was released via Spotify on 14 March 2020. "Physical" was included as the fourth track on Future Nostalgia, released 27 March 2020. On 9 April 2020, a lyric video for the song was shared to YouTube. Lipa performed the song at her 27 November 2020 Studio 2054 livestream concert, as the sixth track on the setlist. On 5 December 2020, she performed it at both the 2020 LOS40 Music Awards and 2020 NRJ Music Awards as a medley with her 2020 single "Levitating". The song was included in a medley of Future Nostalgia tracks for Lipa's performance at the 2021 Brit Awards. It was included on the setlist of Lipa's 2022 Future Nostalgia Tour as the opening song.

== Critical reception ==
"Physical" was met with acclaim from music critics. Chris Taylor of The Line of Best Fit called it "this decade's perfect workout song". Gigwise's Jordan Emery regarded the song among "the most well crafted and fun pop songs heard in recent memory", saying it "throws you around the room with its frenetic intensity". In his review for Entertainment Weekly, Marc Snetiker described the song as "immediately, irresistibly catchy". Music critic Peter Robinson referred to it as Lipa's best single since 2015's "Be the One", and said the former is "so powerful it could reverse Brexit". In The Irish Times, Louise Bruton called the song "riveting" and "a perfect pop song". Writing for The Boston Globe, Nora Princiotti viewed "Physical" as an "instant-classic" and a "spine-tingling endorphin blast" with a "huge chorus". The Daily Beast's Kevin Fallon thought it signaled the "old-meets-new, disco-meets-techno, electronica-meets-soulfulness" of the album.

In his review for Pitchfork, Eric Torres wrote that the song's "vigorous chorus is as fit for the gym as the dancefloor" and appreciated that it "brushes past simplistic, imitative devotion". Music critic Maura Johnston expressed similar feelings, writing that "Physical" resisted "the urge to let familiarity do the heavy lifting" and the reference to Newton-John's track was "reinterpreted in exciting ways". Meanwhile, Jonathan Wright of God Is in the TV wrote that Lipa "manages to take the perhaps overused lyric, 'let's get physical' and deliver it with a thrilling energy". The Independent's Helen Brown favoured Lipa's vocals for being "muscular with authority" and said, "Each note gets down and gives her 20." Similarly, Conrad Duncan of Under the Radar appreciated the singer's "spirited" vocals, while Brad Garcia from Exclaim! complimented the use of her higher vocal register and named it among Lipa's "strongest performances".

Yasmin Cowan from Clash said Lipa is "ferocious in her execution" and succeeds in "putting her own feminist spin" on a "formulaic theme". Nick Malone of PopMatters described the song's imagery and production as "gleefully campy", and said it "confidently [toes] the line between taste and the total lack thereof", and "could aptly soundtrack both a high-speed chase montage and Jamie Lee Curtis in Perfect". In The New York Times, Caryn Ganz wrote that "Physical" is "not as iron-clad" as Lipa's previous single "Don't Start Now", but "has enough sizzle to winningly live up to the album's title". On the other hand, Sal Cinquemani of Slant Magazine called it "a bit of a bait-and-switch" for referencing Newton-John's "Physical", but viewing the song as akin to "the frenetic future-pop" of her 1983 song "Twist of Fate". Vulture's Craig Jenkins compared the chorus melody to that of Patti LaBelle's 1984 single "New Attitude".

== Awards and nominations ==
"Physical" was nominated for International Song of the Year at the 2020 NRJ Music Awards and Song of the Year at the 2021 Brit Awards, while also winning the 2020 Popjustice £20 Music Prize and the 2020 OGAE Song Contest. The song also placed on numerous 2020 year-end lists, including unranked ones published by BuzzFeed, E! News, Esquire, Glamour, Nylon and Thrillist. NME and Popjustice both thought it was 2020's second best song while Dazed ranked it at number five on their year-end list. It was placed at number 20 on Cosmopolitan's year-end list and number 18 on one published by i-D. The BBC and Billboard ranked it at number nine and 28 on their respective year-end lists. In Pitchfork, they published it as the 49th best song of 2020 while Stereogum placed it as the fifth best pop song of the year. In The Guardian, the song was hailed as the eighth best song of the year and the song placed on unranked lists published by the publication's writers Michael Cragg, Alexis Petridis, Dave Simpson and Kate Solomon.

== Commercial performance ==
In February 2020, "Physical" debuted at number 12 on the UK Singles Chart, with first-week sales of 29,700 units. Following the release of Future Nostalgia, the song experienced a 30% sales increase and peaked at number three, selling 44,921 units. The track was Lipa's eighth single to chart in the top 10 of the UK Singles Chart and her fourteenth overall entry. The song spent a total of 24 weeks on the chart. In August 2026, "Physical" was certified triple platinum by the British Phonographic Industry (BPI) for track-equivalent sales of 1,800,000 units in the United Kingdom. In Ireland, "Physical" became Lipa's sixth single to reach the top 10 of the Irish Singles Chart and peaked at number two, being held off the top spot by Saint Jhn's track "Roses" (2016).

In Australia, "Physical" debuted at number 30 on the ARIA Singles Chart issue dated 16 February 2020. Following Future Nostalgia's release, the song rose to a peak of number nine on the chart. It was awarded a double platinum certification from the Australian Recording Industry Association (ARIA) for selling 140,000 track-equivalent units in the country. In New Zealand the song reached the sixteenth position and was awarded a triple platinum certification from Recorded Music NZ (RMNZ) for track-equivalent sales of 90,000 units in the country. On the German Singles Chart published by GfK Entertainment, the song debuted at number 39 and ultimately peaked at number 14. In Belgium, the song reached number two in the Wallonia region of the country and number three in the Flanders region.

On the US Billboard Hot 100, "Physical" debuted at number 60, but was not released to radio in the country, and spent only two weeks on the chart. In Canada, the track peaked at number 54 on the Canadian Hot 100 and lasted for 11 weeks on the chart. The song was awarded a platinum certification in the former country from the Recording Industry Association of America (RIAA) and a triple platinum certification in the latter country from Music Canada. In the US it sold 1,000,000 track-equivalent units while in Canada it sold 240,000. The Hwasa remix peaked at number 127 on South Korea's Gaon Digital Chart. The track charted at number 38 in Brazil's monthly streaming chart, where it was later certified double diamond by Pro-Música Brasil for sales of 320,000 units. In September 2020, Billboard launched their Global 200 chart and "Physical" debuted at number 117.

== Music video ==
=== Production and concept ===
The music video for "Physical" was directed by Lope Serrano and Nicolás Méndez of the Catalan production company Canada. Lipa contacted Canada through their London office to direct the video, and it was filmed at Fira de Barcelona in Plaça d'Espanya, Barcelona. The video was shot over the time span of three 16-hour working days in December 2019. A budget of €500,000 was used for the production, which involved the hiring of about 80 staff and over 150 dancers, the majority of whom were Catalan professionals. The video was choreographed by Charm La'Donna. Ariadna Martín was hired as Lipa's stunt double, mainly for the scene which required balancing on a revolving stage that rotated at 60 km/h (37 mph). She had to dye her hair because there were no wigs available in Lipa's hair colour. The coloured pants in the video were created by Pepe Jeans London as part of the brand's SS20 Dua for Pepe Collection.

The high-concept music video is based on a Venn diagram by Swiss artist duo Peter Fischli and David Weiss from their 1981 series of works Order and Cleanliness. The video matches four primary universal concepts in the diagram; human being, emotions, animals, and matter, to the four primary colours. Each concept is intersected to form new concepts such as technology and meat, and this results in the central concept of an orgasm forming. The dancers in each colour category all have individual slogans on the back of their shirts relating to each concept from the Venn diagram. The concept of the video was inspired by the song's increasing trajectory and crescendo, which Serrano likened to sexual arousal. According to Lipa, the video is about "the feeling of being alive, and coming together, and all those parts of you dancing at the same time and getting physical".

=== Synopsis ===
The fish and kangaroo shirt slogans in one scene of the music video reference the animals concept from a Venn diagram in Peter Fischli and David Weiss' series of works, Order and Cleanliness (1981).

The video begins in a dark, red-lit setting, where Lipa walks towards a male dancer who takes off his jacket, pulling out a paper heart and blows it away. After Lipa puts her hand on his chest, the scene cuts to an anime-inspired animation, in which she pulls out the dancer's heart. Returning to the human scene, Lipa holds his light-emitting diode heart in her hand. The lights switch on and the two of them start to dance in a red circle with other dancers, while she throws his heart away. Cutting to the animation, two cardinals land on the heart in Lipa's hand, turning it into sparkling dust. Lipa is then shown in a human scene, licking her finger and wearing a Yves Saint Laurent black minidress.

As the video progresses, Lipa dances in various coloured warehouse stage sets, changing the colour of her Helmut Lang tank top and Pepe Jeans London straight-cut jeans to match each set. She is next shown in a blue set, reclining in a sports car while people continue to dance and an animated heart beats. Lipa then dances with a group in the purple set and in an animation, presses her fingers into the heart. Returning to the blue set, Lipa and the male dancer run onto a plank and dance over a large hole. During the green set, she encounters a second version of herself and walks backwards towards a building while the set's dancers dance in single file.

In the following yellow segment, Lipa rollerblades with the male dancer on a rotating platform. Their hands animate when they touch and sparkles from her eyes animate, forming a heart. For the climax, dancers from each colour set flood to the middle of the stage, forming a rainbow colour palette around Lipa. They dance together in mixed and same-gender couples. Serrano explained that in this final scene "all the colours (concepts) break their chromatic group obedience and meet together in a purely human celebration of lust and freedom and eclecticism".

=== Release and reception ===
Lipa first teased the music video on social media 15 December 2019, sharing a selfie in costume for it. She shared another photo of herself in costume for it on 16 January 2020, with the caption, "New music coming soon to a galaxy near you...". On 20 January 2020, she shared an image on social media of the sports car featured in the video, with the caption, "Remember the signs..." The music video was released to YouTube on 31 January 2020 at 05:00 PT (12:00 UTC). It was preceded by the release of teaser trailer on the platform, and two teaser clips shared on social media by Lipa. The trailer showed Lipa solving a Rubik's Cube while staring out of an apartment window. On 21 February 2020, a director's cut of the music video was shared via YouTube.

Brian O'Flynn of i-D wrote that the music video marked the return of high-concept pop videos, calling it Lipa's "ascent to art girl glory", and appreciating its diversity, and rejection of heteronormativity. Brendan Wetmore of Paper said the visual "nearly broke gay Twitter". For MTV, Patrick Hosken felt the video manifested Lipa's newfound confidence as a singer and called it "an opus" with "eye-popping production detail". W magazine's Kyle Munzenreider viewed the music video as "a literal kaleidoscope of late '90s and early '00s music video signifiers simmered down to their essence and built up into something new". Rachel Hahn of Vogue said the fashion eschewed maximalist trends, while also favouring deceptive simplicity over extravagance.

=== Accolades ===
The music video for "Physical" placed on numerous year-end lists, including at number four in Elite Daily, number five in IndieWire, number six in Insider, number 13 in Idolator, as well as an unranked list published by Slant Magazine. The video also received numerous awards and nominations, including nominations for Best Video at the 2020 LOS40 Music Awards, Best International Video at the 2021 MVPA Awards, Video of the Year at the 2020 NRJ Music Awards and Favorite Music Video Choreography at the 2021 iHeartRadio Music Awards. It was nominated for Best Music Video and Best Cinematography at the Camerimage Music Video Awards in 2020 while placing in silver for both Best Achievement in Music Video Production and Best Music Promo Film at the Creative Circle Awards. At the 2020 MTV Video Music Awards, the video was nominated for Best Art Direction and Best Choreography as well as winning Best Visual Effects. It was nominated for Best Pop Video, Best Production Design in a Video, Best Styling in a Video and Best Editing in a Video at the 2020 UK Music Video Awards.

== Workout video ==
A 1980s-inspired workout video for "Physical" was released to YouTube on 6 March 2020. It was directed by Daniel Carberry and filmed in New York City on 17 February 2020. The video was created as Lipa desired her own Jane Fonda-like workout video. Branded merchandise from the video was made available for purchase on Lipa's website the same day as the video's release. A version of the video mixed entirely in Sony's 360 Reality Audio from the usage of MPEG-H 3D Audio was released through Amazon Music, Tidal and Deezer. Lipa teased the release with several images on social media and a mock VHS cover art.

The workout video begins with Lipa dressed in a yellow leotard, introducing herself as the instructor of Physical: Get Fit in Under 6. She starts the aerobics class with a breathing exercise and introduction of the attendees; Ginger Snap, Good Ol' Steve, Chitter & Chad, Extra-Va, Bruce the Juice, Sunny & Delight, Tardy B & Upset, and Shay & Dee. Their outfits are imprinted with manga versions of Lipa. Throughout the workout, she does several voice-overs of encouragement as they do routines such as the Hip Thruster, the Fonda, Step Back Step Touch, the Rump Shaker, and the Crybaby. The class also makes time for a water stop, with Lipa noting, "Make sure you stay hydrated during your workout." The video features various 1980s-style neon graphics and technicolour visual effects.

Guy Pewsey of Grazia said the workout video surpassed "Physical" by Newton-John and "Call on Me" by Eric Prydz to become "without question, the most iconic fitness-themed music video of all time". Robin Murray of Clash described it as "tongue in cheek panache" and a homage to "the glory years of workout videos". Newsbeat reporter Steve Holden said Lipa helped lead a re-emergence of 1980s inspiration in pop music in 2020 with the video, calling it "a camp and colourful homage" to televised aerobics classes from the 1980s. In The New York Times, Joe Coscarelli wrote that the video's relevance was renewed during the COVID-19 pandemic.

== Remixes ==
On 17 March 2020, a remix of the song, featuring South Korean singer Hwasa, was released. It features Hwasa singing the first verse in Korean and the bridge in English, while the middle eight is performed bilingually by both singers. An extended play (EP) for remixes of "Physical", including those by Ofenbach, Claptone and Erika de Casier was released on 25 March 2020. A remix of the song by Brazilian DJ Alok was released on 9 April. Lipa and Alok appeared together in an Instagram Live video to promote the remix's release. A remix of "Physical" by Mark Ronson, featuring Gwen Stefani is included on Lipa and the Blessed Madonna's DJ Mix crafted remix album, Club Future Nostalgia, released on 28 August 2020, while the unmixed version was released on 11 September 2020. An electro track, Ronson took apart the original intending for a Ruff Ryders direction, and electronic-R&B mood. After being approached for a "Hollaback Girl" sample on Mr. Fingers' "Hallucinate" remix, Stefani expressed her desire to be on the album. Ronson and the Blessed Madonna quickly incorporated a place for her on "Physical", shortly thereafter. Stefani's vocals were produced and recorded by Lauren D'Elia at Westlake Recording Studios in Los Angeles. The remix was mixed by Brandon Bost.

Insiders reported in 2023 that Lipa intended on releasing a remix of the song featuring Australian singer Troye Sivan in 2021. He wrote and recorded his verse for the song, but her team was supposedly against this and thought that she should choose someone else, suggesting The Weeknd instead. On 22 March 2025, during Melbourne's fourth night of the Radical Optimism Tour, Lipa brought Sivan on stage to perform together. Later on in the show, the two would give a fan in the crowd a USB flash drive containing the remix in MP3 format, entrusting them to leak the file online. The remix would see an official release on digital platforms just a week later on 28 March 2025 to celebrate the fifth anniversary of Future Nostalgia.

== Awards ==
Year	Ceremony	Category	Result
2020	MTV Video Music Awards	Best Visual Effect	Won
2020	MTV Video Music Awards	Best Direction	Nominated

== Track listings ==
- Digital download and streaming
1. "Physical" – 3:13
- Streaming – 360 reality audio
1. "Physical" (360 reality audio) – 5:39
- Digital download and streaming – Hwasa remix
1. "Physical" (featuring Hwasa) – 3:13
- Digital download and streaming – Alok remix
1. "Physical" (Alok remix) – 3:09
- Digital download and streaming – Mark Ronson remix
1. "Physical" (featuring Gwen Stefani) [Mark Ronson remix] – 3:06
- Digital EP – remixes
1. "Physical" (Ofenbach remix) – 2:53
2. "Physical" (Alok remix) – 3:09
3. "Physical" (Claptone remix) – 3:09
4. "Physical" (Erika de Casier remix) – 3:08
5. "Physical" (Leo Zero Disco remix) – 4:16
6. "Physical" (featuring Hwasa) – 3:13
- Digital download and streaming – Troye Sivan remix
1. "Physical" (featuring Troye Sivan) – 3:13

== Personnel ==
- Dua Lipa – vocals
- Jason Evigan – production, engineering, drums, synthesizer, vocal production
- Koz – production, drums, synthesizer
- Todd Clark – backing vocals
- Clarence Coffee Jr. – backing vocals
- Sarah Hudson – backing vocals
- Lorna Blackwood – programming, vocal production
- Gian Stone – engineering, vocal production
- Daniel Moyler – engineering
- Matt Snell – assistant engineering
- Rafael "Come2Brazil" Fadal – additional engineering
- Cameron Gower Poole – vocal engineering
- Matty Green – mixing
- Chris Gehringer – mastering
- Will Quinell – mastering assistant

== Charts ==
=== Weekly charts ===
2020–2021 weekly chart performance for "Physical"
Chart (2020–2021)	Peak position
Argentina Hot 100 (Billboard)	89
Australia (ARIA)	9
Austria (Ö3 Austria Top 40)	13
Belgium (Ultratop 50 Flanders)	3
Belgium (Ultratop 50 Wallonia)	2
Bolivia (Monitor Latino)	10
Canada Hot 100 (Billboard)	54
Chile (Monitor Latino)	12
CIS Airplay (TopHit)	7
Colombia Anglo (Monitor Latino)	20
Colombia (National-Report)	85
Croatia International Airplay (Top lista)	1
Czech Republic Airplay (ČNS IFPI)	3
Czech Republic Singles Digital (ČNS IFPI)	13
Ecuador (National-Report)	27
El Salvador (Monitor Latino)	17
Estonia (Eesti Tipp-40)	10
Euro Digital Song Sales (Billboard)	3
Finland (Suomen virallinen lista)	8
France (SNEP)	30
Germany (GfK)	14
Global 200 (Billboard) (Note: The Billboard Global 200 chart was launched in September 2020. Therefore, "Physical" did not have a full run on the chart.)	117
Greece International (IFPI)	9
Hungary (Rádiós Top 40)	3
Hungary (Single Top 40)	3
Hungary (Stream Top 40)	7
Iceland (Tónlistinn)	25
Ireland (IRMA)	2
Israel International Airplay (Media Forest)	1
Italy (FIMI)	18
Italy Airplay (EarOne)	1
Latvia Streaming (LaIPA)	14
Lebanon Airplay (Lebanese Top 20)	1
Lithuania (AGATA)	6
Mexico (Billboard Mexican Airplay)	8
Netherlands (Dutch Top 40)	4
Netherlands (Single Top 100)	15
New Zealand (Recorded Music NZ)	16
Norway (VG-lista)	21
Paraguay (Monitor Latino)	12
Poland Airplay (ZPAV)	1
Portugal (AFP)	24
Romania (Airplay 100)	6
Russia Airplay (TopHit)	7
Scottish Singles Sales (Official Charts)	3
Singapore (RIAS)	17
Slovakia Airplay (ČNS IFPI)	1
Slovakia Singles Digital (ČNS IFPI)	10
Slovenia (SloTop50)	3
South Korea (Gaon)	127
Spain (Promusicae)	24
Sweden (Sverigetopplistan)	42
Switzerland (Schweizer Hitparade)	15
Ukraine Airplay (TopHit)	44
UK Singles (Official Charts)	3
US Billboard Hot 100	60
US Dance Club Songs (Billboard)	20
US Rolling Stone Top 100	38
Venezuela (Record Report)	48

2022 weekly chart performance for "Physical"
Chart (2022)	Peak position
CIS Airplay (TopHit)	120
Russia Airplay (TopHit)	141
Ukraine Airplay (TopHit)	56

2023 weekly chart performance for "Physical"
Chart (2023)	Peak position
Belarus Airplay (TopHit)	99
CIS Airplay (TopHit)	190
Lithuania Airplay (TopHit)	156
Moldova Airplay (TopHit)	181
Romania Airplay (TopHit)	120

2024 weekly chart performance for "Physical"
Chart (2024)	Peak position
Moldova Airplay (TopHit)	30

=== Monthly charts ===
2020 monthly chart performance for "Physical"
Chart (2020)	Peak position
Brazil (Pro-Música Brasil)	38
CIS Airplay (TopHit)	10
Czech Republic (Rádio Top 100)	8
Czech Republic (Singles Digitál Top 100)	26
Russia Airplay (TopHit)	10
Slovakia (Rádio Top 100)	2
Slovakia (Singles Digitál Top 100)	23
Ukraine Airplay (TopHit)	65

2022 monthly chart performance for "Physical"
Chart (2022)	Position
Ukraine Airplay (TopHit)	76

2024 monthly chart performance for "Physical"
Chart (2024)	Position
Moldova Airplay (TopHit)	94

=== Year-end charts ===
2020 year-end chart performance for "Physical"
Chart (2020)	Position
Australia (ARIA)	51
Austria (Ö3 Austria Top 40)	44
Belgium (Ultratop Flanders)	13
Belgium (Ultratop Wallonia)	16
Croatia International Airplay (Top lista)	11
CIS Airplay (TopHit)	40
France (SNEP)	66
Germany (Official German Charts)	48
Hungary (Rádiós Top 40)	11
Hungary (Single Top 40)	11
Hungary (Stream Top 40)	29
Ireland (IRMA)	25
Italy (FIMI)	97
Netherlands (Dutch Top 40)	16
Netherlands (Single Top 100)	69
Poland (ZPAV)	7
Romania (Airplay 100)	24
Russia Airplay (TopHit)	45
Spain (PROMUSICAE)	75
Switzerland (Schweizer Hitparade)	46
UK Singles (OCC)	19

2021 year-end chart performance for "Physical"
Chart (2021)	Position
CIS Airplay (TopHit)	150
Global Excl. U.S. (Billboard)	185
Hungary (Dance Top 40)	30
Hungary (Rádiós Top 40)	47
Russia Airplay (TopHit)	194

2022 year-end chart performance for "Physical"
Chart (2022)	Position
CIS Airplay (TopHit)	180
Hungary (Dance Top 40)	49
Hungary (Rádiós Top 40)	54
Ukraine Airplay (TopHit)	181

2023 year-end chart performance for "Physical"
Chart (2023)	Position
Belarus Airplay (TopHit)	168
Hungary (Rádiós Top 40)	80

Year-end chart performance
Chart (2025)	Position
Argentina Anglo Airplay (Monitor Latino)	49
Hungary (Rádiós Top 40)	95

== Certifications ==
Certifications and sales
Region	Certification	Certified units/sales
Australia (ARIA)	2× Platinum	140,000^{‡}
Austria (IFPI Austria)	2× Platinum	60,000^{‡}
Belgium (BRMA)	2× Platinum	80,000^{‡}
Brazil (Pro-Música Brasil)	2× Diamond	320,000^{‡}
Canada (Music Canada)	4× Platinum	320,000^{‡}
Denmark (IFPI Danmark)	Platinum	90,000^{‡}
France (SNEP)	Diamond	333,333^{‡}
Germany (BVMI)	Platinum	400,000^{‡}
Italy (FIMI)	Platinum	70,000^{‡}
New Zealand (RMNZ)	3× Platinum	90,000^{‡}
Norway (IFPI Norway)	2× Platinum	120,000^{‡}
Poland (ZPAV)	Diamond	250,000^{‡}
Portugal (AFP)	Platinum	10,000^{‡}
Spain (Promusicae)	3× Platinum	180,000^{‡}
United Kingdom (BPI)	3× Platinum	1,800,000^{‡}
United States (RIAA)	3× Platinum	3,000,000^{‡}
^{‡} Sales+streaming figures based on certification alone.

== Release history ==
Release dates and formats
Region	Date	Format(s)	Version	Label	Ref.
Various	30 January 2020	Digital download; streaming	Original	Warner	
Italy	14 February 2020	Radio airplay	Original	Warner	
Various	6 March 2020	Streaming	360 reality audio	Warner	
Various	17 March 2020	Digital download; streaming	Hwasa remix	Warner	
Various	25 March 2020	Digital download; streaming	Remixes EP	Warner	
Various	9 April 2020	Digital download; streaming	Alok remix	Warner	
Various	11 September 2020	Digital download; streaming	Mark Ronson remix	Warner	
Various	28 March 2025	Digital download; streaming	Troye Sivan remix	Warner	

== See also ==
- List of top 10 singles in 2020 (Australia)
- List of UK top-ten singles in 2020
- List of Media Forest most-broadcast songs of the 2020s in Romania
