= De aquí no sales =

2019 song by Rosalía

Single by Rosalía

from the album El mal querer
- Language: Spanish
- Released: 22 January 2019
- Genre: Experimental; new flamenco
- Length: 2:24
- Label: Columbia
- Songwriters: Rosalía Vila; Pablo Díaz-Reixa; Antón Álvarez
- Producers: El Guincho; Rosalía

Rosalía singles chronology
"Bagdad" (2018)	"De aquí no sales" (2019)	"Con Altura" (2019)

Music video
- "De aquí no sales" on YouTube

"De aquí no sales" (English: "You are not getting out of here") is a song by Spanish singer Rosalía. It was released on 22 January 2019 by Columbia Records as the fifth and final single from her second studio album, El mal querer (2018). The track was produced by El Guincho and co-produced by Rosalía herself. The song peaked at number 22 on the Spanish Singles Chart.

== Content ==
The song is about a fight between a couple in a toxic relationship. The described physical violence refers to the album title, which loosely translates into "the bad love". The clear numbering of songs might hint to the fact that the described violence in this song is the result of the described jealousy in the previous song, "Pienso en tu mirá".

== Music video ==
The music video, directed by Diana Kunst and Mau Morgó, was released on 22 January 2019. It was shot in Campo de Criptana, Spain. In 2019, the music video won the UK Video Music Awards for the Best Pop Music Video International.

The video relates to the song contents by showing Rosalía on a motorbike, continuously sinking deeper in oil, which can be seen as a metaphor for the toxic relationship the lyrics describe.

== Charts ==
Weekly chart performance for "De aquí no sales"
Chart (2018)	Peak position
Spain (Promusicae)	22
