= Oral (song) =

Single by Björk featuring Rosalía
- Language: English; Spanish
- Written: 1998
- Released: 21 November 2023
- Recorded: 1998; March 2023
- Genre: Pop
- Length: 3:43
- Label: One Little Independent
- Songwriter: Björk
- Producer: Björk

Björk singles chronology
"Fossora" (2022)	"Oral" (2023)	"Berghain" (2025)

Rosalía singles chronology
"Tuya" (2023)	"Oral" (2023)	"New Woman" (2024)

Music video
- "Oral" on YouTube

"Oral" is a song by Icelandic musician Björk featuring Spanish singer Rosalía. A charity single to protest against extensive open net pen fish farming in Iceland, it was released on 21 November 2023 through One Little Independent.

To prevent the opening of an industrial salmon farm in Iceland, and to campaign for new Icelandic legislation, Björk and Rosalía donated their rights to the income generated by "Oral" to the non-profit organization AEGIS, founded after it was revealed that there were repeated escapes of thousands of fish into the wild.

The song debuted at number 42 on the Hot Dance/Electronic Songs chart, becoming Björk's first entry on the chart.

On 10 April 2024, a remix of the song by Olof Dreijer was released on streaming services. It is Björk and Dreijer's second collaboration, after Country Creatures (2019).

== Background ==
Björk previously made charity songs to support environmental activism. In 2008, she released the song "Náttúra", featuring Radiohead vocalist Thom Yorke, from which all proceeds went to the Náttúra campaign, an environmental group she co-founded to fight the construction of foreign-backed aluminium factories in Iceland. She founded the Náttúra Foundation that same year to support Iceland's natural habitats and protest against aluminium factories being built there, and campaigned against the construction of an energy project in the country's highlands in 2015, calling for a national park to be created in its stead. She has celebrated the natural world in her music, and has supported activist Greta Thunberg, praising her anthology The Climate Book.

In the wake of nation-wide protests against Norwegian-owned commercial farming operations that threaten to disrupt native ecosystems in Seyðisfjörður, Björk revisited "Oral", a song she composed in 1998, and offered it to Rosalía, who she had met through el Guincho in 2017. The proceeds from the song will go towards anti-fish farming organized activists in the Eastfjord.

== Composition ==
"My interpretation of the lyrics are that you're wondering about revealing your feelings to a man, maybe crossing over from a dream state. (...) It's totally that moment when you've met someone, and you don’t know if it's friendship or something more. So you become, I guess, aroused. And you become very aware of your lips. That's maybe why I called the song 'Oral'. You don’t know what the consequences are if you act. Sometimes fantasy can be amazing, and that's enough; you don't have to also do things."

— Björk on the lyrics of "Oral", Rolling Stone

"Oral" was written between the release of her 1997 album Homogenic and the recording cycle of Vespertine (2001). However, "it was too poppy and didn't really fit either of those albums" so she "put it on salt". The singer had a special feeling for the song, revisiting it "every three years asking her manager to go look for it, but he could never find it because she kept giving him the wrong name". After remembering the title of the lost record in March 2023 while in a hotel room in Australia, thinking she could use it to benefit the environment, "where [her] heart is", she states, she asked Rosalía to help her update it for a contemporary audience as she wanted it "to be in some conversation with the present". The song was co-produced by the Irish-Chilean musician Sega Bodega and is in English except for one line in Spanish.

"Oral" was described as a Jamaican dancehall-inspired pop song about "wondering about revealing your feelings to a man, maybe crossing over from a dream state". The Guardian stated that it was also not Björk at her most experimental but "as poppy and sugarous as she'll ever get".

== Music video ==
The music video was directed by the photographer and visual artist Carlota Guerrero, who utilized artificial intelligence in its production. It sees two AI-generated deepfake versions of the artists train together, with it exploring themes of female wrath and unionization to confront a greater enemy. The video was shot at the Granja de la Ricarda in El Prat de Llobregat, Spain.

At the beginning of the video, the following quote is displayed:

Björk and Rosalía are donating all their rights to income generated by this song to the AEGIS non-profit organisation to combat open pen fish farming in Iceland. Their record companies have agreed to do the same. All funds raised will support legal fees for protesters, taking action to stop the development of intensive farms that harm wildlife, deform fish, and pose risks to salmon's DNA and survival. Immediate action is crucial.

== Track listing ==
- Streaming/digital download
1. "Oral" – 3:42
- Streaming/digital download – Olof Dreijer Remix
1. "Oral" (Olof Dreijer Remix) – 5:21

== Credits and personnel ==
Credits adapted from the music video.

- Björk – vocals, writing, production
- Rosalía – vocals, additional production, additional vocal arrangement
- Sega Bodega – additional beat production
- Noah Goldstein – additional beat production
- Heba Kadry – mixing, mastering
- David Rodriguez – additional engineering

== Charts ==
Chart performance for "Oral"
Chart (2023)	Peak position
UK Singles Downloads (OCC)	53
UK Singles Sales (OCC)	55
US Hot Dance/Electronic Songs (Billboard)	42

== Release history ==
Release dates and formats for "Oral"
Region	Date	Format(s)	Label	Ref.
Various	21 November 2023	Digital download; streaming	One Little Independent	
Italy	21 November 2023	Radio airplay	One Little Independent	
Various	10 April 2024	Digital download; streaming	One Little Independent	
Various	29 November 2024	12-inch vinyl	One Little Independent	
