= Malamente =

2018 single by Rosalía

Single by Rosalía

from the album El mal querer
- Language: Spanish
- Released: 30 May 2018
- Recorded: 2017
- Studio: Casa Arte (El Hierro, Canary Islands)
- Genre: Alternative R&B
- Length: 2:29
- Label: Columbia
- Songwriters: Rosalía Vila; Pablo Díaz-Reixa; Antón Álvarez
- Producers: El Guincho; Rosalía

Rosalía singles chronology
"Aunque es de noche" (2017)	"Malamente" (2018)	"Pienso en tu mirá" (2018)

Music video
- "Malamente" on YouTube

"Malamente" (English: "Badly") is a song by Spanish singer Rosalía. It was released on 30 May 2018 by Columbia Records as the lead single from her second studio album, El mal querer (2018). Written by Rosalía and El Guincho and produced by Rosalía and co-produced by El Guincho, it was released on 30 May 2018 through Columbia Records as the album's lead single.

"Malamente" mixes flamenco with urban and pop music. It received positive reviews, and was nominated for five Latin Grammy Awards, including Song of the Year and Record of the Year, winning for Best Alternative Song and Best Urban Fusion/Performance. Billboard and Pitchfork named it one of the songs that defined the 2010s. Journalist and writer Leila Cobo included the song in her book La fórmula 'Despacito', which gathers the most emblematic hits of Latin music of the last 50 years. With this release, media dubbed the artist as "Hurricane Rosalía".

== Background and release ==
At the end of April 2018, Rosalía published a short documentary video to her social media accounts where she talked about her new album. She said: "Everything I have I am leaving it here; I'm in the red, I'm risking a lot. This project is what I've always wanted to do, I've been thinking for a long time about making an album like the one I'm going to release. The flamenco inspiration is still there but, at the same time, it is something else." Three days after the international release of the song "Brillo", composed by herself and in collaboration with Colombian rapper J Balvin, the singer announced in her social networks that she was going to release a new single in the coming days. Finally, on 29 May 2018 she unveiled the release date of this new single, as well as its title.

== Composition and lyrics ==
"Malamente" is an alternative R&B song that fuses elements of flamenco, pop, reggaeton, and R&B. It was written in the island of El Hierro and talks about a toxic relationship and how the woman knew that something wrong was going to happen in her life. The song forms the introductory part of its parent album's narrative arc, which is inspired by the 13th-century Occitan novel Flamenca. The novel revolves around themes of gender violence and tragic romance; how a man falls in love with a woman and, because of jealousy, he locks her up in a tower. In the song, Rosalía narrates that even though everyone is warning her that their relationship is doomed, she will continue with it to the point of getting married.

== Critical reception ==
The American magazine Pitchfork called the singer's voice "a soft liquid velvet" and wrote that "'Malamente' consumes the listener with drums and soft synthesizers that drag you to their world completely". The Guardian commented on the following about the Catalan singer: "Rosalía is the most exciting thing that is going to happen to music this 2018". The single was nominated in five categories at the 2018 Latin Grammys. "Malamente" won two of these awards for Best Alternative Song and Best Urban Fusion/Performance.

In September 2020, Billboard named "Malamente" the 32nd best Latin song of all time and stated that "Rosalía's contemporary, hip hop/electronic take on traditional flamenco was different from anything heard before. Released in tandem with a stunning, provocative video full of imagery and Spanish symbolism, 'Malamente' broke ranks, visually and musically, amalgamating Rosalía's flamenco vocals with loops, beats, and raps, turning every preconception about her country's iconic musical tradition on its head". Also, Pitchfork named "Malamente" the 23rd best song of the 2010s.

== Commercial performance ==
=== Spain ===
«Malamente» became Rosalía's first ever chart appearance in her native Spain. In its first week the song debuted at number 74 on the PROMUSICAE chart, issued June 6, 2018. Jumping up 70 spots to number four in its second week of performance, it became her highest-climbing single, first top ten and top five single. The next weeks on the chart the single would start to decrease in popularity, slowly going down in the chart. Following the release of El mal querer the single would see a commercial boost that made the song jump 22 positions moving from 24 to its peak at number 2 in its 24th charting week on the issue dating November 11, 2018. After peaking at number two, «Malamente» stayed two more weeks, blocked by Rosalía's own «Di mi nombre», the first debut artist since the chart is published to occupy the chart's first two spots. The song had a 75-week run. Rosalía's longest appearance on the chart after «Despechá». And was certified as 5× platinum for shipments of 300.000 equivalent units.

The music video, produced by the audiovisual company Canada, was played more than a million times two days after its release and accumulated two million views for 3 June on YouTube, as well as a million streams on Spotify. The song debuted in the fourth position on the PROMUSICAE musical chart. "Malamente" was certified a Gold Record in Spain in the first week of July, as well as a platinum record in August 2018. Finally, in October of that same year it was certified double platinum. In November, the song reached the second position in the Spanish Song Charts thanks to the album release.

The track was included in many soundtracks of TV shows and movies and has been featured in their respective soundtracks. These include the first season of Elite, the second season of The OA, Euphoria and Good Girls as well as in the soundtrack of the 2019 movie Hellboy.

== Live performances ==
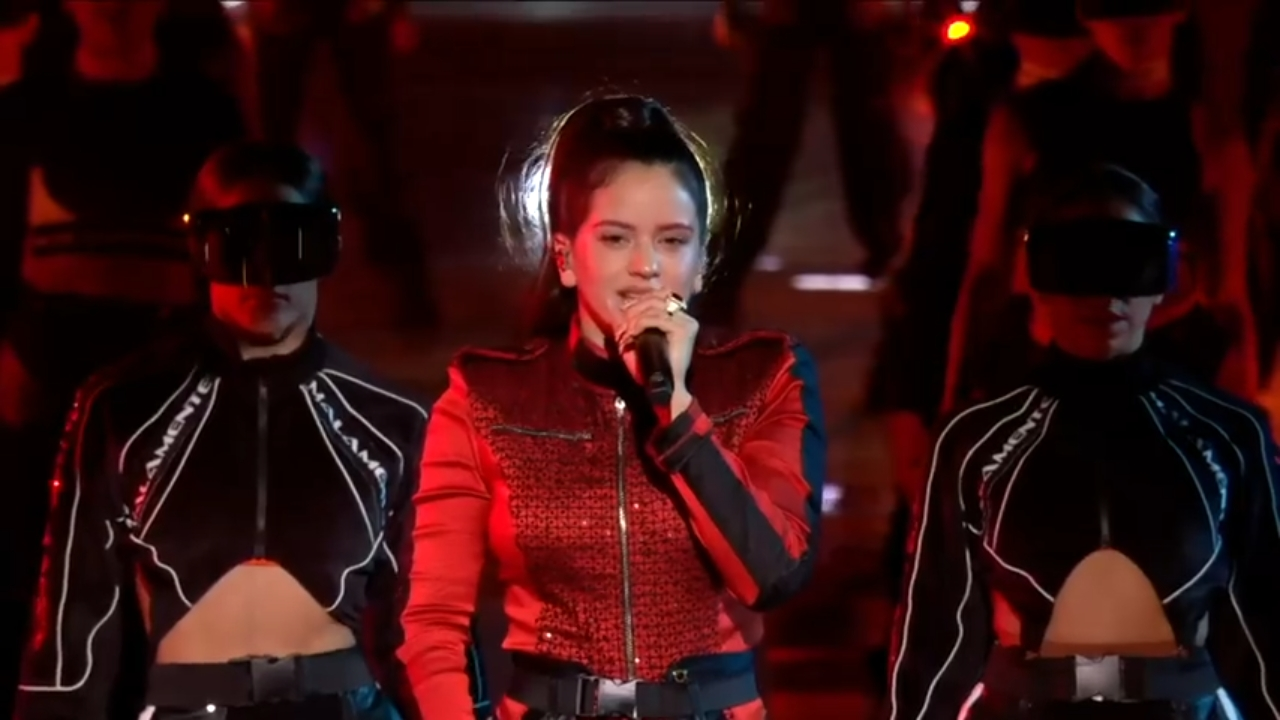
Rosalía performing a medley of "De aquí no sales" and "Malamente" at the MTV Europe Music Awards 2018.

"Malamente" was performed in a great quantity of festivals and award shows during its promotion period. Its first performance happened at Sónar music festival, held at the Fira de Montjuïc on 15 June 2018. Rosalía later performed at Festival Cultura Inquieta in Getafe, near Madrid, at the Flamenco Biennial in Seville, and in Santiago de Compostela. She also served as the opening act for Rozalén at Starlite Festival, in Marbella and for Juanes at the Hollywood Bowl, in Los Angeles. In September, Rosalía presented "Malamente" for the first time in Miami to celebrate her five Latin Grammy nominations.

Televised performances of "Malamente" include an appearance on BBC program Later... with Jools Holland, where she sang "Malamente" and "Pienso en tu mirá". On 31 October 2018 she offered a free concert sponsored by Red Bull at the Plaza de Colón, in Madrid in front of 11,000 people. It was livestreamed through YouTube. Two days later she performed "Malamente" at LOS40 Music Awards and, on 4 November, at the 2018 MTV Europe Music Awards gala, in Bilbao. On 11 November, she performed "Malamente" at Casa Patas, Madrid, an iconic place for flamenco artists and lovers. On 15 November, she performed the song at the 2018 Latin Grammys ceremony in Las Vegas.

"Malamente" was included in the setlist of her Mal Querer Tour (2019) and in the Motomami World Tour (2022).

== Music video ==
The music video for the song was released simultaneously with the single on digital platforms. It was directed and produced by the company Canada, marking the third time that they worked with the Spanish singer after videos for "De plata" and "Aunque es de noche", and filmed simultaneously with the "Pienso en tu Mirá" video.

Marked by its poetic symbolism, the video is considered a "visual poem" interpreted as omens for the failure of a love relationship. The imagery includes a man in a typical Holy Week capirote riding a skateboard with nails, which spawned a certain controversy for its religious implications, or Rosalía riding a motorbike that is bullfought by a man in a white studio set. Other alternated scenes show Rosalía dancing inside the back of a truck or being hit by a car. The music video was filmed between Barcelona, Badalona, Barberà del Vallès and l'Hospitalet de Llobregat and depicts Rosalia in the industrial zone of the city, recreating the constant truck traffic and industries that there are in her hometown Sant Esteve Sesrovires.

"Malamente" was nominated for three UK Video Music Awards out of which won two: Best Pop Video and Best Direction. The video also received nominations for Best Music Video at the Latin Grammy Awards and Video of the Year at the Premio Lo Nuestro 2019.

== Charts ==
=== Weekly charts ===
Weekly chart performance for "Malamente"
Chart (2018–2019)	Peak position
Belgium (Ultratip Bubbling Under Flanders)	3
Belgium (Ultratip Bubbling Under Wallonia)	26
Ecuador (National-Report)	21
Portugal (AFP)	79
Spain (PROMUSICAE)	2
Venezuela (National-Report)	97

=== Year-end charts ===
2018 year-end chart performance for "Malamente"
Chart (2018)	Position
Spain (PROMUSICAE)	14

2019 year-end chart performance for "Malamente"
Chart (2019)	Position
Spain (PROMUSICAE)	50

== Certifications ==
Certifications and sales for "Malamente"
Region	Certification	Certified units/sales
Brazil (Pro-Música Brasil)	Platinum	40,000^{‡}
France (SNEP)	Gold	100,000^{‡}
Mexico (AMPROFON)	2× Platinum+Gold	150,000^{‡}
Spain (Promusicae)	5× Platinum	200,000^{‡}
United States (RIAA)	Gold	500,000^{‡}
^{‡} Sales+streaming figures based on certification alone.

== Release history ==
Release dates for "Malamente"
Country	Date	Format	Label
Various	30 May 2018	Digital download; streaming	Columbia
Spain	17 June 2018	Contemporary hit radio	Columbia
Italy	12 October 2018	Contemporary hit radio	Columbia
