= Canada (company) =

Video and short film production company

Las Montañas Del Canada, S.L.
- Trade name: CANADA
- Industry: Visual arts
- Founded: 2008
- Founders: Lope Serrano; Nicolás Méndez; Luis Cerveró
- Headquarters: Barcelona, Spain
- Area served: Worldwide
- Key people: Lope Serrano (CD); Nicolás Méndez (CD); Alba Barneda (HOP)
- Products: Music video production; Television advertisements; Short films
- Subsidiaries: CANADA London
- Website: canadacanada.com

CANADA is a creative production company headquartered in the Poblenou district of Barcelona, Spain, with bases in London and Los Angeles. The company specialises in the global production and direction of music videos, commercials and short films. Works include music videos for Dua Lipa, Tame Impala and Rosalía, as well as TV spots for Louis Vuitton, IKEA, Coca-Cola, Mercedes-Benz and Apple, among many others.

== History ==
In 2008, directors Nicolás Méndez, Lope Serrano and Luis Cerveró, who worked from the same artistic perspective, decided to join forces to improve and develop their own initiative focused on the audiovisual sector after working for many years for different companies. Global Head of Production and partner Alba Barneda has been a key part of the CANADA collective since its foundation. It was founded during the 2008 financial crisis and the 2008-2014 Spanish financial crisis. In 2010, it made a breakthrough by producing a music video for El Guincho's track "Bombay", which went viral on Vimeo and was named the best music video of the year by Rockdelux. This meteoric increase in popularity attracted projects from the United Kingdom, where they created work for bands like Scissor Sisters, The Vaccines and Battles.

After a few years represented by the production company Partizan, the group decided to change partners, trying, in this way, to approach the production sector and founded an office in London, UK. Before opening alone officially in Los Angeles, from December 2012 until June 2020, the company was represented in the United States by Roman Coppola, the founder and owner of The Directors Bureau.

In the mid-2010s, the company helped to put local artists such as Bad Gyal, C. Tangana or Rosalía on the map internationally. After the latter released her hit single "Malamente" in May 2018 and its music video directed by CANADA received universal acclaim to the point that it was nominated for a Latin Grammy Award for Best Short Form Music Video and was named Video of the Year by Pitchfork, the company grew exponentially, directing at the end of the decade and beginning of the next one music videos for internationally known artists from Travis Scott to Dua Lipa. CANADA was also responsible for the commercials campaigns for brands such as Louis Vuitton, as well as for the 2020 Gaudí Cinema Awards spot.

== Work ==
Year	Song	Artist	Director
2010	"Bombay"	El Guincho	CANADA
2010	"Invisible Light"	Scissor Sisters	CANADA
2010	"What You Know"	Two Door Cinema Club	CANADA
2011	"All in White"	The Vaccines	CANADA
2011	"Ice Cream"	Battles	CANADA
2012	"New Lands"	Justice	CANADA
2013	"Ardiente Figura"	Extraperlo	Roger Guàrdia
2013	"Can't Stop Now"	The Aston Shuffle	Penascola
2013	"Desfachatez"	Fangoria	Marçal Forés
2013	"Destitute Time"	Delorean	Roger Guàrdia
2013	"Fases"	Mates Mates	Roger Guàrdia
2013	"Fieras"	Extraperlo	Roger Guàrdia
2013	"Fina Vanidad"	Extraperlo	Roger Guàrdia
2013	"Heat"	Furguson	Roger Guàrdia
2013	"Meteoritos en Hawaii"	Papa Topo	Roger Guàrdia
2013	"Resplandor"	Extraperlo	Roger Guàrdia
2013	"Sangre en los Zapatos"	Papa Topo	Roger Guàrdia
2013	"The Big Shift"	Maia Vidal	Pablo Maestres
2013	"Trying To Be Cool"	Phoenix	CANADA
2013	"You Should Know"	Breakbot	CANADA
2014	"Antes O Después"	Fangoria	Virgili Jubero
2014	"Galaxy Punk"	Sleepy Sun	Gerson Aguerri
2014	"Gardenias"	Elsa De Alfonso Y Los Prestigio	Marçal Forés
2014	"L'Ós"	La Iaia	Marc Oller
2014	"Me Gusta Que Me Pegues"	Los Punsetes	CANADA
2014	"Move With You"	Jacob Banks	CANADA
2014	"Stay Awhile"	She & Him	CANADA
2015	"Body Talk"	Foxes	Virgili Jubero
2015	"Come Home Baby"	The Charlatans	Dario Peña
2015	"Davey Crockett / All My Loving"	The Parrots, Hinds	Dario Peña
2015	"Garden"	Hinds	Dario Peña
2015	"Handsome"	The Vaccines	Gerson Aguerri
2015	"La Tejedora"	Christina Rosenvinge	Darío Peña
2015	"Make You Mine"	Family of the Year	Marc Oller
2015	"The Less I Know The Better"	Tame Impala	CANADA
2015	"The Yabba"	Battles	Roger Guàrdia
2015	"Till I Found You"	Josef Salvat	Darío Peña
2015	"Tu Casa Nueva"	El Último Vecino	Gerson Aguerri
2015	"Your Brain Is Made Of Candy"	Mourn	Roger Guàrdia
2016	"Antes de Morirme"	C. Tangana, Rosalía	MANSON
2016	"Comix"	El Guincho	Roger Guàrdia
2016	"Geometría Polisentimental"	Fangoria	Roger Guàrdia
2016	"Irrational Friend"	Mourn	Roger Guàrdia
2016	"Siempre"	Agorazein	MANSON
2016	"Singular"	Anna Bonny	Chloe Wallace
2016	"Itch"	Nothing But Thieves	Darío Peña
2016	"Warts"	Hinds	Darío Peña
2016	"What's It Gonna Be?"	Shura	Darío Peña
2017	"Aquí Y Ahora"	Hidrogenesse	Darío Peña
2017	"Chill Aquí"	Extraperlo	MANSON
2017	"Up All Night"	Beck	CANADA
2017	"Química (Dance With Me)"	Bomba Estéreo	CANADA
2017	"De Plata"	Rosalía	MANSON
2017	"Don't Matter Now"	George Ezra	Marc Oller
2017	"Hula Hoop 8000"	Monarchy	Virgili Jubero
2017	"Faithless"	Flyte	CANADA
2017	"Mala Mujer"	C. Tangana	MANSON
2017	"Me Voy"	Ibeyi, Mala Rodríguez	MANSON
2017	"Nicest Cocky"	Bad Gyal	Roger Guàrdia
2017	"Persiguiéndonos"	C. Tangana	Manson
2017	"Telephone"	The Zephyr Bones	Roger Guàrdia
2018	"Candela"	Bad Gyal	MANSON
2018	"Cry Bird"	Tennyson	Darío Peña
2018	"Dazed By The Desert"	Zeeland	Femke Huurdeman
2018	"L.A."	Mujeres	Marc Oller
2018	"Malamente"	Rosalía	Nicolás Méndez aka CANADA
2018	"No Chance"	Jarami	Nicolás Méndez aka CANADA
2018	"Pienso en Tu Mirá"	Rosalía	Nicolás Méndez aka CANADA
2018	"Saturn Is Not That Far Away"	Stella McCartney Kids	Roger Guàrdia
2018	"Wrong Turn"	Blanche	Nur Casadevall
2018	"Yo Sigo Iual"	Bad Gyal	Cyprien Clément-Delmas
2019	"Crowns"	North State	Nur Casadevall
2019	"Deal Wiv It"	Mura Masa, Slowthai	Yoni Lappin
2019	"Exits"	Foals	Albert Moya
2019	"Harleys in Hawaii"	Katy Perry	MANSON
2019	"Me Quedo"	Aitana, Lola Indigo	Réalité
2019	"No Hope Generation"	Mura Masa	Yoni Lappin
2019	"No Te Debí Besar"	C. Tangana, Paloma Mami	ROGELIO
2019	"Religion"	Shura	Chloe Wallace
2019	"Toutes les Machines Ont Un Cœur"	Maëlle	Nur Casadevall
2019	"Zorra"	Bad Gyal	Cyprien Clément-Delmas
2020	"Aprendiendo el Sexo"	Bad Gyal	Alba Farelo
2020	"Limitless"	Sudan Archives	Femke Huurdeman
2020	"Physical"	Dua Lipa	Lope Serrano aka CANADA
2020	"Stay"	Dora	Marc Oller
2020	"TKN"	Rosalía, Travis Scott	Nicolás Méndez aka CANADA
2021	"Love Again"	Dua Lipa	Lope Serrano aka CANADA
2021	"Mirror"	Sigrid	Femke Huurdeman
2021	"Muñequita Linda"	Najwa	Bàrbara Farré
2021	"Perra"	Rigoberta Bandini	Irene Moray
2021	"Ya No Vales"	Alizzz, C. Tangana	Félix Bollain
2022	Motomami TikTok Live	Rosalía	STILLZ
2022	"La Canción Que No Quiero Cantarte"	Amaia, Aitana	Virgili Jubero
2022	"El Pañuelo"	Romeo Santos, Rosalía	Roger Guàrdia
2022	"Tu Casa Nueva"	El Último Vecino	Gerson Aguerri
2022	"Sin Carné"	Bad Gyal	MANSON
2023	"Colmillo"	Tainy, J Balvin, Young Miko, Jowell & Randy	Pau Carrete
2023	"Sirens"	Travis Scott	CANADA
2024	"I Luv It"	Camila Cabello	Nicolás Méndez aka CANADA
2025	"Cro-Magnon Man"	Squid	Rory Alexander Stewart
2025	"Berghain"	Rosalía, Björk, Yves Tumor	Nicolás Méndez

== Accolades ==
Year	Project	Artist	Institution	Recognition	Result
2010	"Bombay"	El Guincho	Rockdelux	Music Video of the Year	Won
2017	"Mala Mujer"	C. Tangana	Los40 Music Awards	Best National Video of the Year	Nominated
2018	"Up All Night"	Beck	The Recording Academy	Best Music Video	Nominated
2018	"Pienso en tu Mirá"	Rosalía	UK Music Video Awards	Best Pop Video - International	Nominated
2018	"Malamente"	Rosalía	The Latin Recording Academy	Best Short Form Music Video	Nominated
2018	"Malamente"	Rosalía	Rober Awards Music Prize	Best Promo Video	Nominated
2018	"Malamente"	Rosalía	UK Music Video Awards	Best Production Design in a Video	Nominated
2018	"Malamente"	Rosalía	UK Music Video Awards	Best Pop Video - International	Won
2018	"Malamente"	Rosalía	Pitchfork	Music Video of the Year	Won
2019	"Malamente"	Rosalía	Design and Art Direction	Best Direction	Won
2019	"Malamente"	Rosalía	Design and Art Direction	Best Music Video	Won
2019	"Malamente"	Rosalía	Premios Lo Nuestro	Video of the Year	Nominated
2019	"Pienso en tu Mirá"	Rosalía	MTV Millennial Awards	Video of the Year	Nominated
2019	"Me Quedo"	Aitana; Lola Indigo	Los40 Music Awards	Best National Video of the Year	Nominated
2020	"Malamente"	Rosalía	Premios Odeón	Best Music Video	Nominated
2020	"Harleys in Hawaii"	Katy Perry	MTV Video Music Awards	Best Cinematography	Nominated
2020	"Physical"	Dua Lipa	MTV Video Music Awards	Best Art Direction	Nominated
2020	"Physical"	Dua Lipa	MTV Video Music Awards	Best Visual Effects	Won
2020	"Physical"	Dua Lipa	NRJ Music Awards	Video of the Year	Nominated
2020	"Physical"	Dua Lipa	Camerimage	Best Music Video	Nominated
2020	"Physical"	Dua Lipa	Camerimage	Best Cinematography	Nominated
2020	"Physical"	Dua Lipa	UK Music Video Awards	Best Pop Video	Nominated
2020	"Physical"	Dua Lipa	UK Music Video Awards	Best Production Design in a Video	Nominated
2020	"Physical"	Dua Lipa	UK Music Video Awards	Best Styling in a Video	Nominated
2020	"Physical"	Dua Lipa	UK Music Video Awards	Best Editing in a Video	Nominated
2020	"Physical"	Dua Lipa	Los40 Music Awards	Best International Video	Pending
2020	"TKN"	Rosalía; Travis Scott	Latin Grammy Awards	Best Short Form Music Video	Won
2020	"TKN"	Rosalía; Travis Scott	UK Music Video Awards	Best Pop Video - International	Nominated
2020	"TKN"	Rosalía; Travis Scott	Los40 Music Awards	Best Latin Music Video	Pending
2021	"Love Again"	Dua Lipa	UK Music Video Awards	Best Pop Video	Won
2021	"Straight to the Morning"	Hot Chip ft Jarvis Cocker	UK Music Video Awards	Best Alternative Video	Won
2026	Canada	-	Berlin Music Video Awards	Best Production Company	Nominated
