= El mal querer =

2018 studio album by Rosalía

Studio album by Rosalía
- Released: 2 November 2018
- Recorded: May 2016–November 2017
- Studios: Casa Arte (El Hierro, Canary Islands); El Guincho Studio (Barcelona); Lo-Fi Studios (Barcelona)
- Genres: Flamenco pop; experimental pop; trap-pop; R&B
- Length: 30:13
- Language: Spanish
- Label: Columbia
- Producers: El Guincho; Rosalía

Rosalía chronology
Los Ángeles (2017)	El mal querer (2018)	Motomami (2022)

Singles from El Mal Querer
- 1. "Malamente" Released: 30 May 2018; 2. "Pienso en tu mirá" Released: 24 July 2018; 3. "Di mi nombre" Released: 30 October 2018; 4. "Bagdad" Released: 4 December 2018; 5. "De aquí no sales" Released: 22 January 2019

El mal querer (transl. 'The Bad Loving') is the second studio album (and first of original material) by Spanish singer and songwriter Rosalía. It was released on 2 November 2018 by Columbia Records. (Note: The album was initially leased to Sony Music Spain.) The album was written by Rosalía and co-produced with El Guincho on an initial low budget as an independent artist. Presented as experimental and conceptual; a "romantic document that seamlessly links flamenco's characteristic melodrama to the storytelling of modern, woman-flexing R&B", the album follows the anonymous 13th-century Occitan novel Flamenca. It served as the singer's baccalaureate project upon her graduation from Catalonia College of Music with honors.

Promotion prior to the album release encompassed the release of three singles: "Malamente", "Pienso en tu mirá"—both accompanied by music videos that went viral on social media—and "Di Mi Nombre". Two other singles, "Bagdad" and "De Aquí No Sales", were released after the album. Other promotional initiatives included the display of a billboard in Times Square, as well as live performances at several Spanish festivals, a sold-out concert at Plaza de Colón, the 2018 MTV Europe Music Awards and the Latin Grammy Awards. To further promote the album, Rosalía embarked on the El Mal Querer Tour, which commenced in March 2019 and ended that December.

The album received universal critical acclaim for its experimental production—the use of flamenco elements mixed with pop and urbano music—Rosalía's vocals, and accompanying visuals. It became a commercial success, reaching the top of the Spanish Charts and the US Billboard Latin Pop Albums chart. It also scored her second consecutive Premio Ruido win. Since June 2021, El Mal Querer holds the record for the longest-charting album in Spanish history.

All aspects of El Mal Querer, including visuals, engineering, composition and vocals, were highly awarded by the Recording Academy. At the 2018 Latin Grammy Awards, "Malamente" was nominated for five awards including Record of the Year, Song of the Year, Best Short Form Music Video, Best Urban Fusion Performance and Best Alternative Song, winning the latter two, and at the next year's ceremony, the album won for Album of the Year, Best Contemporary Pop Vocal Album, Best Engineered Album and Best Recording Package, while the song "Pienso En Tu Mirá" was nominated for Best Pop Song. With six awards, it became the most awarded album by a female artist and the only female artist to win Album of the Year after Shakira. The album also won the Grammy Award for Best Latin Rock, Urban or Alternative Album at the 62nd Annual Grammy Awards. In the 2020 update of Rolling Stone's 500 Greatest Albums of All Time, El Mal Querer was named the greatest Spanish-language album of all time and the 315th best overall. The same magazine placed it in the 50 Best Concept Albums of All Time of 2022, also being the best in Spanish-language and the 10th best overall.

== Background and release ==
The record cycle for Rosalía's sophomore album, El Mal Querer, began in late 2016 as her baccalaureate project at the Catalonia College of Music. She chose to work alongside Spanish musician El Guincho and spawned its concept alongside friend Ferran Echegaray, who bet on the Romance of Flamenca to follow the album's storyline. Thus, every song on the album would be a chapter of the story narrated in the anonymous Occitan novel. Despite having no budget to produce the record as she was an independent artist working on a university project, Rosalía invested a lot of her own money, to the point of almost going bankrupt. However, she continued working on it, stating that "my goal was to find a way to explain this tradition that I'm obsessed with in the most personal way without fear and with risk. Before releasing the album I was in debt and had no guarantees that this would work but I had the hope that, since I was making it from my heart, whether it was a few or many, that those people that liked it, would like it for real". The album was almost completely recorded at El Guincho's apartment in Barcelona with a computer, a microphone and an audio interface.

At the end of April 2018, Rosalía published a short documentary video to her social networks where she talked about her new album. She said: "Everything I have I am leaving it here; I'm in the red, I'm risking a lot. This project is what I've always wanted to do, I've been thinking for a long time about making an album like the one I'm going to release. The flamenco inspiration is still there but, at the same time, it is something else." Three days after the international release of the song "Brillo", composed in collaboration with Colombian reggaeton singer J Balvin, Rosalía announced on her social networks that she was going to release a new single in the coming days. Finally, on 29 May 2018, "Malamente" was released. Rosalía confessed that El Mal Querer is actually her final bachelor's degree project, graduating from flamenco studies.

== Music ==
El Mal Querer is a flamenco pop, trap-pop, experimental pop, and R&B record that mixes flamenco music with contemporary urban sounds drawn from pop and reggaeton. Critics noted the experimental tendencies in the production.

== Critical reception ==
Professional ratings
Aggregate scores
Source	Rating
Metacritic	89/100
Review scores
Source	Rating
AllMusic	5/5 stars
Crack	7/10
The Guardian	5/5 stars
Jenesaispop	9/10
Mondo Sonoro	9/10
Ondarock	6/10
Pitchfork	8.8/10
Q	4/5 stars
Rolling Stone	4/5 stars

El Mal Querer was widely acclaimed by music critics; at Metacritic, the album received an average score of 89, based on five reviews, indicating "universal acclaim". Writing for The Guardian, head critic Alexis Petridis highly commended the album, giving it the highest rating and describing it as "the calling card of a unique new talent." He praised Rosalía's vocals for giving the album "a head-turning freshness", noting that her singing style "is audibly rooted in a different musical tradition to the usual styles in which pop vocalists perform."

Pitchfork ranked El Mal Querer the sixth best album of 2018, with Philip Sherburne complimenting its combination of traditional and modern styles, and praising Rosalía's voice, saying, "Whether breathy or belting, she's as commanding a presence as Spanish-language pop has encountered in ages—less an ambassador for flamenco than the inventor of her own fascinating hybrid."

Conversely, Rosalía has been accused of cultural appropriation by some Spanish publications, due to her use of gitano symbology. She is from Catalonia, which has underlying "cultural and political tensions" with Andalusia, the home of flamenco. Paula Ibieta of Phoenix New Times cited "the questionable nature of Rosalía's aesthetic and use of Andalusian slang". Rosalía has responded that the controversy is positive, and that flamenco elements will always be present in her work.

=== Year-end rankings ===
Publication	Country	List	Year	Rank	Ref.
Rolling Stone	Argentina	The 18 Best Albums of 2018	2018	1	
GQ	Russia	The 20 Best Albums of 2018	2018	2	
ABC	Spain	The 10 Best National Albums	2018	1	
Rockdelux	Spain	Best National Albums of the 2010s	2019	1	
Fact	United Kingdom	50 Best Albums of 2018	2018	3	
NME	United Kingdom	Albums of the Year 2018	2018	94	
The Guardian	United Kingdom	The 50 Best Albums of 2018	2018	31	
Gorilla vs. Bear	United States	Gorilla vs. Bear's Albums of 2018	2018	3	
Stereogum	United States	50 Best Albums of 2018	2018	21	
Tiny Mix Tapes	United States	Favorite 50 Music Releases of 2018	2018	31	
The New York Times	United States	The 28 Best Albums of 2018	2018	6	
The Needle Drop	United States	Top 50 Albums of 2018	2018	21	
Paper	United States	Top 20 Albums of 2018	2018	6	
Pitchfork	United States	The 50 Best Albums of 2018	2018	6	
Billboard	United States	50 Best Albums of 2018	2018	17	
Rolling Stone	United States	50 Best Albums of 2018	2018	31	

=== Decade-end lists ===
Publication	Country	List	Year	Rank	Ref.
GQ	Spain	The Best Records of the Decade	2019	2	
Hipersónica	Spain	The 51 Best Spanish Albums of the Decade	2019	18	
Rockdelux	Spain	Best National Albums of the 2010s	2019	1	
Pitchfork	United States	The 200 Best Albums of the 2010s	2019	36	
Billboard	United States	The 100 Greatest Albums of the 2010s	2019	25	
Rolling Stone	United States	The 100 Best Albums of the 2010s	2019	39	

=== All-time lists ===
Publication	Country	List	Year	Rank	Ref.
Rolling Stone	United States	500 Greatest Albums of All Time	2020	315	
Rolling Stone	United States	The 50 Greatest Concept Albums of All Time	2022	10	
American Songwriter	United States	7 of the Best Concept Albums of All Time —from The Beatles, Frank Sinatra and More	2022	3	
Billboard	United States	The 100 Best Album Covers of All Time	2023	33	

== Impact ==
=== Literature ===
After the release of El Mal Querer, demand skyrocketed for Flamenca, the medieval novel that inspired the album. In September 2019, Roca Editorial reissued the novel, marking it as "a 13th-century classic feminist novel" and noting the inspiration the novel provided for Rosalía's project. Anton M. Espalader, who translated the book into Catalan, stated to Verne, "We have to congratulate Rosalía and thank her for this phenomenon that is not currently occurring in other countries. It is always good news that a medieval novel of these characteristics returns to bookstores." The themes surrounding the narrative of the album, which revolves around the toxicity of a heterosexual relationship, became instruments for teachers and professionals to explain topics related to gender violence. It also became a narrative to analyze didactically in literature courses. Parallelly, El Mal Querer spawned controversy in Spain as it mainly takes inspiration of flamenco and gypsy culture and symbolism. While some personalities and media outlets, like The New York Times, defended Rosalía by saying "the debate on the cultural appropriation of the Spanish singer is unfair: her music embodies, with height, the most eloquent artistic form of globalization: the remix", many others criticized Rosalía's privilege as a white person within the music industry, stating that a Romani female would never have had the same amount of opportunities as her. These topics were analyzed in many college theses. María Guadalupe Benzal Alía, a degree student in Translation and Interpretation and with a diploma in Intercultural Communication ratified by the Comillas Pontifical University of Madrid, wrote her thesis about the album, which she titled Análisis intercultural del álbum musical de Rosalía Vila, El Mal Querer y el consecuente rechazo de la comunidad gitana española. Peter Manuel, ethnomusicology professor emeritus (CUNY Graduate Center), published the journal article The Rosalía Polemic: Defining Genre Boundaries and Legitimacy in Flamenco also based on the controversy.

All sociology and musicology behind El Mal Querer was compiled in the 2021 essay book Ensayos Sobre el Buen Querer, written by thirteen authors.

=== Visuals ===
Spanish-Croatian artist Filip Ćustić is responsible for the visual aspect of the album. The visuals of El Mal Querer are mainly inspired in contemporary paintings, including The Two Fridas, Ángeles y Fuensanta, Ophelia, Naranjas y Limones, and La Maja Vestida. Upon its release, Ćustić started to be cited by the international press as "one of the present day's most sensational young artists". In 2019, he won the Latin Grammy for Best Recording Package. Ćustić later worked with Lil Nas X on the cover art for his hit single "Montero (Call Me by Your Name)", which resembled The Creation of Adam. Again, the visual art of El Mal Querer became the subject of many college theses, including Raquel Baixauli and Esther González Gea's (both ethnomusicology students) Rosalía y el discurso visual de El Mal Querer. Arte y folclore para un empoderamiento femenino ("Rosalía and the visual discourse of El Mal Querer. Art and folklore for female empowerment") as well as Silvia Vaquero Tramoyeres' essay El Mal Querer de Rosalía: análisis estético, audiovisual e interpretativo. Vaquero is an audiovisual communication student at Technical University of Valencia. Welsh singer Marina explained that Ćustić's artwork for the album inspired the cover art for her fifth studio album, Ancient Dreams in a Modern Land (2021). The iconicity of this musical era was brought to television in 2021, with the contestants of Drag Race España recreating the looks of it in a special episode called "the night of the thousand Rosalías".

=== Marketing ===
The marketing strategies used to promote the album were often discussed in the Spanish media. They highlighted a very American way to promote the album especially through appearances in MTV and pointed out a big fight to internationalize the singer and turn her into a superstar, yet an underground artist. They also distinguished all the digital marketing around the album. In 2018, Rosalía became one of the first Spanish artists to promote a musical project on a billboard in Times Square. Rosalía was noted for the constant use of long personalized acrylic nails and for the mix of an urban and elegant fashion, which would often receive mixed reviews. She also "took the color red and made it her own" while mixing it with traditional Spanish and Catholic symbolism. She has often made visual references to industrial plants, trucks, suburban culture, bullfighting and Holy Week.

== Legacy ==
Many critics have seen an increase of popular interest in flamenco music after the release of El Mal Querer, highlighting that Rosalía "has made the harrowing music of Andalusia into a global phenomenon". In 2021, Stereogum noted the cultural influence of Rosalía in Kacey Musgraves' interpretation of Violeta Parra's signature song "Gracias a la Vida", included on her fifth studio album Star-Crossed, as well as in Christina Aguilera's La Fuerza (2022). Various media outlets also saw a resemblance to the intention of El Mal Querer in C. Tangana's 2021 studio album El Madrileño, claiming "it is a kind of continuation of the path El Mal Querer started".

== Tour ==
The Spanish singer embarked on a festival tour, El Mal Querer Tour, from March to December 2019. The tour began on March 29 in Buenos Aires, as part of Lollapalooza. Rosalía later performed at other festivals in North America such as Coachella, Made in America and Astroworld, as well as solo concerts in San Francisco, Los Angeles, New York City and Toronto. The latter half of the year brought the tour to Europe, with Rosalía taking part in festivals such as Glastonbury and Primavera Sound. Encore solo shows in Europe happened in December, with five sold-out shows in Paris, London, Barcelona and Madrid.

== Track listing ==
All tracks produced by El Guincho and Rosalía. All music by Rosalía Vila and Pablo Díaz-Reixa, unless noted otherwise.

El Mal Querer track listing
No.	Title	Lyrics	Music	Length
1.	"Malamente" (Cap.I: Augurio)	Rosalía Vila; Pablo Díaz-Reixa; Antón Álvarez		2:29
2.	"Que no salga la luna" (Cap.II: Boda)	Vila; Díaz-Reixa; Álvarez		4:29
3.	"Pienso en tu mirá" (Cap.III: Celos)	Vila; Díaz-Reixa; Álvarez		3:13
4.	"De aquí no sales" (Cap.IV: Disputa)	Vila; Díaz-Reixa; Álvarez		2:24
5.	"Reniego" (Cap.V: Lamento)	Vila; Public domain	Public domain; Vila; Díaz-Reixa; Jesús Carmona	3:28
6.	"Preso" (Cap.VI: Clausura)	Rossy de Palma; Ferran Echegaray		0:40
7.	"Bagdad" (Cap.VII: Liturgia)	Vila; Díaz-Reixa; Álvarez	Vila; Díaz-Reixa; Luis García; Leticia Sala; Justin Timberlake; Timothy Mosley; Scott Storch	3:02
8.	"Di mi nombre" (Cap.VIII: Éxtasis)	Vila; Díaz-Reixa; Álvarez	Public domain; Vila; Díaz-Reixa	2:42
9.	"Nana" (Cap.IX: Concepción)	Public domain; Vila; Díaz-Reixa	Public domain; Vila; Díaz-Reixa	3:17
10.	"Maldición" (Cap.X: Cordura)	Public domain; Vila; Díaz-Reixa; Álvarez		2:55
11.	"A ningún hombre" (Cap.XI: Poder)	Vila; Díaz-Reixa; Álvarez		1:34
Total length:				30:13

Notes

- All tracks are stylized in all caps except the chapters. For example, "Malamente (Cap.I: Augurio)" is stylized as "MALAMENTE (Cap.I: Augurio)".

Sample credits

- "Que No Salga la Luna" contains a sample of "Mi Cante por Bulerías", performed by La Paquera de Jerez.
- "Bagdad" interpolates "Cry Me a River", performed by Justin Timberlake.
- "Maldición" contains a sample of "Answers Me", performed by Arthur Russell.

== Personnel ==
Credits adapted from liner notes.

Musicians

- Rosalía – vocals (1–5, 7–11), choir (1–4, 7–8, 10), claps (1, 2, 7, 8), ad-libs (1–4, 6, 8), arrangements (1–4, 6–11), sampler (3, 4, 10), keyboard (3, 7, 10), bass (3, 8, 10), motorcycles (4), 808 (4), harmonizer (9), synthesizer (10)
- Pablo Diaz-Reixa – Herreño drum (1), 808 (1, 3, 4, 7, 8), synthesizers (1, 8, 10), claps (1, 7), ad-libs (1–4, 8), arrangements (1–4, 7–11), sampler (2–4, 9, 10), bass (2, 3, 7, 8, 10), harmonizer (3, 9, 11), keyboard (3, 7, 9, 10), motorcycles (4), choir arrangement (7)
- Antón Álvarez – ad-libs (1)
- Lin Cortés – choir (2)
- Nani Cortés – choir (2)
- Las Negris – choir (2, 8), "jaleos" (2, 8)
- Los Mellis – claps (2–4, 8), choir (2, 8)
- Juan Mateo – "jaleos" (2)
- Milagros – choir (3)
- Ana Molina Hita – choir management (Milagros; 3)
- Bratislava Symphony Orchestra – orchestra (5)
- David Hernando Rico – orchestra direction (Bratislava Symphony Orchestra; 5)
- Juan Mateos – whistles (6)
- Rossy de Palma – special appearance (vocals) (6)
- Coro infantil del Orfeó Català – choir (7)
- Joan Albert Amargós – choir arrangement (7)
- Laura Boschetti – harp (8)

Technical personnel

- Jaycen Joshua – mixing
- Jacob Richards – mixing assistance
- Rashawn McLean – mixing assistance
- Mike Scaberg – mixing assistance
- Pablo Diaz-Reixa – recording engineer
- Chris Athens – mastering
- Brian Hernández – recording engineer (3, 7)

Concept and artwork

- Rosalía – conceptualization, original idea
- Ferran Echegaray – conceptualization
- Filip Ćustić – photography
- Tamara Pérez – art direction
- Carlos Pérez Rullan – technical assistance
- Claire Romain – art assistance
- Carla Casals – makeup
- Raquel Pintado – makeup
- Pili Vila – stylist
- O Estudio Creativo – production company
- Man Mourentan – graphic design

== Charts ==
=== Weekly charts ===
Chart (2018–2019)	Peak position
Belgian Albums (Ultratop Flanders)	76
Belgian Albums (Ultratop Wallonia)	138
Dutch Albums (Album Top 100)	95
Portuguese Albums (AFP)	20
Spanish Albums (Promusicae)	1
Swiss Albums (Schweizer Hitparade)	56
US Latin Albums (Billboard)	10
US Latin Pop Albums (Billboard)	1

=== Year-end charts ===
Chart (2018)	Position
Spanish Albums (PROMUSICAE)	5
Chart (2019)	Position
Spanish Albums (PROMUSICAE)	4
US Top Latin Albums (Billboard)	72
Chart (2020)	Position
Spanish Albums (PROMUSICAE)	29
Chart (2021)	Position
Spanish Albums (PROMUSICAE)	66

== Certifications and sales ==
Region	Certification	Certified units/sales
Mexico (AMPROFON)	Platinum	60,000^{‡}
Spain (Promusicae)	3× Platinum	120,000^{‡}
^{‡} Sales+streaming figures based on certification alone.

== See also ==
- 2018 in European music
- 2018 in Latin music
- List of concept albums
