= Tuya (Rosalía song) =

Single by Rosalía
- Language: Spanish
- Released: 9 June 2023
- Recorded: 2023
- Genre: Reggaeton
- Length: 2:34
- Label: Columbia
- Songwriters: Rosalia Vila; Noah Goldstein; Carlos E. Ortiz Rivera; David Rodriguez; Dylan Wiggins; Juan G. Rivera Vazquez
- Producers: Rosalía; Noah Goldstein; Dylan Patrice; Chris Jedi; Gaby Music

Rosalía singles chronology
| "Beso" (2023) | "Tuya" (2023) | "Oral" (2023) |

Music video
- "Tuya" on YouTube

"Tuya" (transl. "Yours") is a song by Spanish singer Rosalía. It was released on 9 June 2023 by Columbia Records.

== Background and composition ==
The song was written by Rosalía and produced by long-time collaborators Chris Jedi and Gaby Music. The singer accidentally leaked the song on her socials on 31 May and quickly deleted it. Rosalía announced the release of the song on 7 June. The song's lyrics reference a female same-sex relationship.

== Music video ==
On 7 June, she shared a preview of the music video. The video was filmed in Tokyo in May 2023. An announcement post on her Instagram included several behind-the-scenes photos from the video set.

== Charts ==
Chart performance for "Tuya"
| Chart (2023) | Peak position |
|---|---|
| Argentina Hot 100 (Billboard) | 62 |
| France (SNEP) | 170 |
| Global 200 (Billboard) | 139 |
| Portugal (AFP) | 53 |
| Spain (PROMUSICAE) | 10 |
| Switzerland (Schweizer Hitparade) | 29 |
| US Hot Latin Songs (Billboard) | 38 |

== Certifications ==
Certifications for "Tuya"
| Region | Certification | Certified units/sales |
|---|---|---|
| Spain (Promusicae) | Platinum | 60,000^{‡} |
^{‡} Sales+streaming figures based on certification alone.
