= Di mi nombre =

Single by Rosalía

from the album El mal querer
- Language: Spanish
- Released: 30 October 2018
- Studio: El Guincho Studio (Barcelona)
- Genre: Flamenco pop; alternative R&B
- Length: 2:42
- Label: Columbia
- Songwriters: Rosalía Vila; Pablo Díaz-Reixa; Antón Álvarez
- Producers: El Guincho; Rosalía

Rosalía singles chronology
"Pienso en tu mirá" (2018)	"Di mi nombre" (2018)	"Bagdad" (2018)

Music video
- "Di mi nombre" on YouTube

"Di mi nombre" (English: "Say my name") is a song by Spanish singer Rosalía. It was released on 30 October 2018 by Columbia Records as the third single from her second studio album, El mal querer (2018). It was written by the singer herself and C. Tangana with a part inspired by a Spanish song used in gypsy weddings. The track was produced by El Guincho and co-produced by Rosalía herself. It reached number one in Spain the same week the album was released, becoming Rosalía's first number-one song in the country, and also making Rosalía the first artist to reach, at the same time, the top position of singles, album sales and album streamings, with Aitana being the second artist to do so weeks later.

== Background ==
In September 2018, the singer was asked by Spanish actor and internet personality Brays Efe about the album's third single in an interview with Cosmopolitan magazine. Rosalia responded that "it can not be revealed yet, I can't say anything by now." On 29 October, the singer finally revealed its name alongside the video's concept on her social media.

== Music and lyrics ==
The song begins with "gypsy-inspired choirs", which forms a hook throughout the song, and a simple backing of claps.

Following the release of the song and its video, several listeners accused Rosalía of appropriating the culture of Gitanos (Spanish Roma), believing she sings "el yeli" in the song, which is traditionally sung to brides at Gitano weddings. Rosalía later clarified on social media that she is actually singing "ay ali", and said she based the song on the tangos of the 1950s Spanish gypsy cantaora La Repompa de Málaga.

== Critical reception ==
Tom Breihan of Stereogum called the song "gorgeously thrumming". Salvatore Maicki of The Fader described the song as "intoxicating and gritty", saying Rosalía "whisks the deceptively simple production into a universe of her own with syrupy autotune and uncoy demands".

== Music video ==
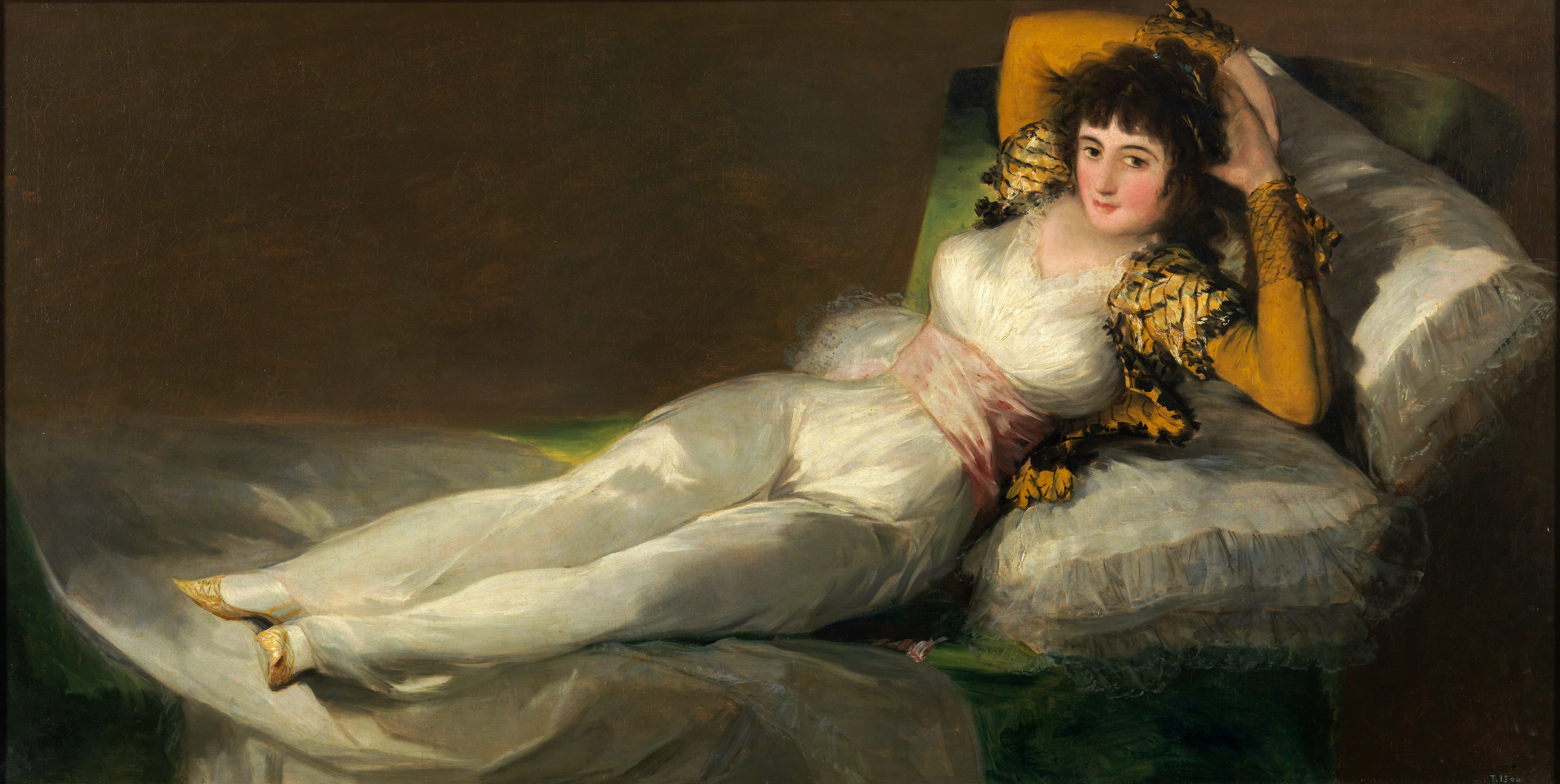
The music video references Francisco Goya's painting La maja desnuda

The video was directed by Henry Scholfield and is presented as a single take. It features Rosalía dancing in various rooms with colorful lighting. Stereogum called the video another of Rosalía's "gorgeously produced freaked-out fantasias that do fascinating things with symbols of Spanish identity" and likened its lighting to a 1970s Italian horror film. Quinn Moreland of Pitchfork compared the opening shot of Rosalía lying in bed to Francisco Goya's painting La maja desnuda/La maja vestida (The Naked Maja/The Clothed Maja) and named it one of the six best music videos of October 2018. This was also noted by Celia Cuervo of Harper's Bazaar, who treated it as a deliberate homage due to the choice of clothing.

== Charts ==
Chart performance for "Di mi nombre"
Chart (2018)	Peak position
Spain (Promusicae)	1

== Certifications ==
Certifications for "Di mi nombre"
Region	Certification	Certified units/sales
Mexico (AMPROFON)	Gold	30,000^{‡}
Spain (Promusicae)	2× Platinum	80,000^{‡}
^{‡} Sales+streaming figures based on certification alone.
