= New flamenco =

Genre of Spanish music

- Native name: Nuevo flamenco, flamenco nuevo
- Stylistic origins: Flamenco; rumba flamenca; jazz; blues; rock; pop; electronic
- Cultural origins: Late 1970s, Spain

Other topics
- Nueva canción

New flamenco (or nuevo flamenco) or flamenco fusion is a musical genre that was born in Spain, starting in the 1980s. It combines flamenco guitar virtuosity and traditional flamenco music with musical fusion (with genres like jazz, blues, rock, rumba, and years later reggaeton, hip hop, or electronic music).

== Origins ==
Spain in the 1970s had changed in politics and society after the democratic transition. Traditional flamenco artists, being displaced in Spain in the 1950s and 1960s by rock-and-roll and influenced by the variety of musical styles that came from the rest of Europe and America, created the so-called "flamenco fusion".

José Antonio Pulpón was the decisive instigator of this fusion. He urged the cantaor Agujetas to collaborate with the Andalusian rock group Pata Negra, and fostered the artistic union between Paco de Lucía and Camarón de la Isla, who gave flamenco a creative boost, representing the definitive break with Mairena's conservatism .

Camarón was a popular cantaor due to his personality and his art, and had a wide audience of followers. Paco de Lucía was the one brought to flamenco music the new cultural influences of jazz, Brazilian and Arabic music. He also introduced new instruments, such as the transverse flute and the Peruvian cajon. Other outstanding artists were Juan Peña El Lebrijano, who fused flamenco with Andalusian music, and Enrique Morente, who has drawn from with rock influences.

== Development ==
In the 1980s a new generation of flamenco artists emerged who had been influenced by the mythical cantaor Camarón, Paco de Lucía, Morente, etc. These artists were interested in popular urban music, which in those years was renewing the Spanish music scene, it was the time of the Movida madrileña. Among them are “Pata Negra”, who fused flamenco with blues and rock, Ketama, of pop and Cuban inspiration and Ray Heredia, creator of his own musical universe where flamenco occupies a central place.

At the end of that decade and throughout the following, the recording company Nuevos Medios released many musicians under the label Nuevo Flamenco. Thus, this denomination has grouped musicians who are very different from each other, both interpreters of orchestrated flamenco, as well as rock, pop or Cuban music musicians whose only connection with flamenco is the similarity of their vocal technique with that of the singers, their family origins or their gypsy origin; Examples of these cases can be Rosario Flores, daughter of Lola Flores, or the renowned singer Malú, niece of Paco de Lucía and daughter of Pepe de Lucía, who despite sympathizing with flamenco and keeping it in her discography has continued with her personal style and it has stayed in the music industry on its own merits.

However, the fact that many of the interpreters of this new music are also renowned cantaores, in the case of José Mercé, El Cigala and others, has led to labeling everything they perform as flamenco, although the genre of their songs differs quite a bit from the classic flamenco.

Other contemporary artists, such as the groups O'Funkillo and Ojos de Brujo, following the path of Diego Carrasco, use non-flamenco musical styles but respecting the compass or metric structure of certain traditional styles. There are also encyclopedic singers such as Arcángel, Miguel Poveda, Mayte Martín, Marina Heredia, Estrella Morente or Manuel Lombo who, without renouncing the artistic and economic benefits of fusion and new flamenco, maintain a greater weight of conceived flamenco in their performances. in the most classic sense of the term, which is a significant return to the origins.

== Present ==
In recent years, New Flamenco has become more important in the Spanish music scene and internationally. Many artists have mixed traditional flamenco with other popular genres to introduce themselves to a larger and younger audience. An artist who has reinvented flamenco to make it her hallmark is Rosalía, an indisputable name on the international music scene. "Pienso en tu mirá", "Di mi nombre" or the song that catapulted her to fame, "Malamente", are a combination of styles that includes a flamenco/south Spain traditional musical base. Rosalía has broken the limits of this musical genre by embracing other urban rhythms. The Catalan artist has been awarded several Grammy and Latin Grammy Awards, as well as MTV Video Music Awards. Rosalía also garners more than 21 million monthly listeners on Spotify.

But it's not the only successful case. The Granada-born Dellafuente is another clear example of the fusion of rap, trap and flamenco. Dellafuente defines his music as "timeless folk", which has catapulted him to collaborate with greats of Spanish song such as Mala Rodríguez or rapper C. Tangana who have also used flamenco in their songs. In his musical line we also have the artists MAKA or RVFV.

Demarco Flamenco is another group that catapulted itself in 2017 with the fusion of flamenco with pop. A style with which he exceeded more than 30 million reproductions in Spain. Currently, Marco Jesús Borrego, harvests more than two million listeners per month on Spotify. These collaborations have raised him to fame with his fusion music, garnering more than a million monthly listeners to his Spotify songs. One of his best known hits is "Me pelea" which shows the importance of flamenco for the singer both musically and visually.

But there are many other examples such as Maria Àrnal and Marcel Bagés that recover old forgotten sound files and updated popular songs: jotas del delta, traditional Valencian songs and touches of traditional flamenco; El Niño de Elche, one of the most outstanding solo songs that mixes flamenco with post-rock from Madrid; Sílvia Pérez Cruz with her baroque style in which she introduces herself to chamber music, Portuguese music and expressionist trenemdism with her experimental walk through traditional flamenco; Califato 3/4 group that combines flamenco with Electronic, Hip hop, Punk, Andalusian Rock; modern projects such as Mëstiza (DJs) integrate flamenco rhythms into electronic productions; Juanito Makandé, who fuses traditional flamenco with funk or jazz, being considered a flamenco-underground artist; Soledad Morente Carbonell, Spanish flamenco and pop rock singer; Lin Cortés combining flamenco with Jazz, soul or funk; María José Llergo o Fuel Fandango with unmistakably flamenco elements with an intimate air although with a futuristic finish of electronic music and digital bass and bass that transports the song to clearly contemporary territories.

The Spanish music scene is experiencing a change in its music and new rhythms are re-emerging together with new artists who are experimenting to cover a wider audience that wants to maintain the closeness that flamenco has transmitted for decades.

== Recognition ==
Rocío Jurado, was the singer who internationalized flamenco in the early seventies. Rocío's interpretation of the “Fandangos de Huelva” and the “Alegrías” was recognized worldwide, for having a perfect voice range for these genres. She used to be accompanied by Tomatito, and Enrique Melchor; both in Spain and in Venezuela, Colombia and Puerto Rico. However, many more flamenco artists have stood out for their success in other countries such as Latin America.

Along with the consolidation of flamenco and the continuous creation around it, it is joined by its growing expansion worldwide. Maria del Mar Fernández, in 2011 made the flamenco style known in India. He acted in the video clip of presentation for the movie “Sólo se vive una vez”, under the title of “Señorita”. The film was watched by more than 73 million viewers.

On the other hand, every day the interest of the public authorities in the promotion of flamenco, and in spreading its cultural and heritage values is greater. So much so that there is an Andalusian Agency for the Development of Flamenco, within the Ministry of Culture of the Junta de Andalucía.

Currently, Jerez de la Frontera is the City of Flamenco, which will house the future National Center of Flamenco Art, of the Ministry of Culture. From this institution the initiatives that are carried out on flamenco will be channeled and organized.

Since 2010, Flamenco has been an Intangible Cultural Heritage of Humanity.

== See also ==
- Flamenco rumba
- Flamenco rock
- Flamenkito
- Flamenco fusión árabe
