= Pienso en tu mirá =

2018 single by Rosalía

Single by Rosalía

from the album El mal querer
- Language: Spanish
- Released: 24 July 2018
- Genre: Alternative R&B; electro-R&B
- Length: 3:13
- Label: Columbia
- Songwriters: Rosalía Vila; Pablo Díaz-Reixa; Antón Álvarez
- Producers: El Guincho; Rosalía

Rosalía singles chronology
"Malamente" (2018)	"Pienso en tu mirá" (2018)	"Di mi nombre" (2018)

Music video
- "Pienso en tu mirá" on YouTube

"Pienso en tu mirá" (English: "I think about your gaze") is a song by Spanish singer Rosalía. It was released on 24 July 2018 by Columbia Records as the second single from her second studio album, El mal querer (2018). The track written by the singer herself, along with C. Tangana, and produced by El Guincho and co-produced by Rosalía herself. An alternative R&B and electro-R&B song, it was released on 24 July 2018 through Columbia Records as the album's second single. The song was nominated for Best Pop Song at the 2019 Latin Grammy Awards.

== Music video ==
The music video for "Pienso En Tu Mirá" was directed by Nicolás Méndez of production company CANADA, and filmed alongside the "Malamente" music video in May 2018, within five days in Barcelona, Badalona, L'Hospitalet and Barberà del Vallès, Spain.

As a follow-up to the "Malamente" video, "Pienso en tu mirá" is a "visual poem" full of icons and imagery. The story begins with a plastic flamenco woman doll swinging on the rear mirror of a truck that crashes against a wall.

Throughout the video, Rosalía appears being covered in jewels, chased by female characters that dance around her, or trapped in a loop in a room with no exit. One of the most iconic scenes in the video depicts Rosalía surrounded by men who point at her with knives and shotguns. This has been compared to a submissive stance, which shifts once Rosalía stands up and the camera moves to portray an empowering low-angle shot.

Physically strong and intimidating truck drivers are also seen, with blood coming out from their chests, referencing the chorus lyrics "Pienso en tu mirá, tu mirá, clavá, es una bala en el pecho" ("I think of your gaze — It's like a bullet embedded in my chest"). This reference is also present when Rosalía is loading up a rifle with black olives, to later reveal that the olives are indeed the eyes of a stuffed bull head.

The video ends with Rosalía walking away from the inside of a truck where a man is destroying many objects with a bat. In the last scene, the protagonist sends messages via WhatsApp from the top of the vehicle already knocked down, in the middle of the chaos.

== Live performances ==
Rosalía performed the song along with "Malamente" on BBC TV show Later... with Jools Holland on 16 October 2018. On 31 October 2018, she performed it in front of 11,000 people at a free concert brought by Red Bull at the Plaza de Colón, in Madrid.

== Usage in media ==
"Pienso En Tu Mirá" was used in a commercial for clothing retailer Pull&Bear in 2018.

== Charts ==
=== Weekly charts ===
Weekly chart performance for "Pienso en tu mirá"
Chart (2018)	Peak position
Panama (Monitor Latino)	18
Spain (Promusicae)	5

=== Year-end charts ===
Year-end chart performance for "Pienso en tu mirá"
Chart (2018)	Position
Spain (PROMUSICAE)	47

== Certifications ==
Certifications and sales for "Pienso en tu mirá"
Region	Certification	Certified units/sales
Brazil (Pro-Música Brasil)	Gold	20,000^{‡}
Mexico (AMPROFON)	Platinum+Gold	90,000^{‡}
Spain (Promusicae)	3× Platinum	120,000^{‡}
^{‡} Sales+streaming figures based on certification alone.
