= List of Rosalía live performances =

Rosalía live performances
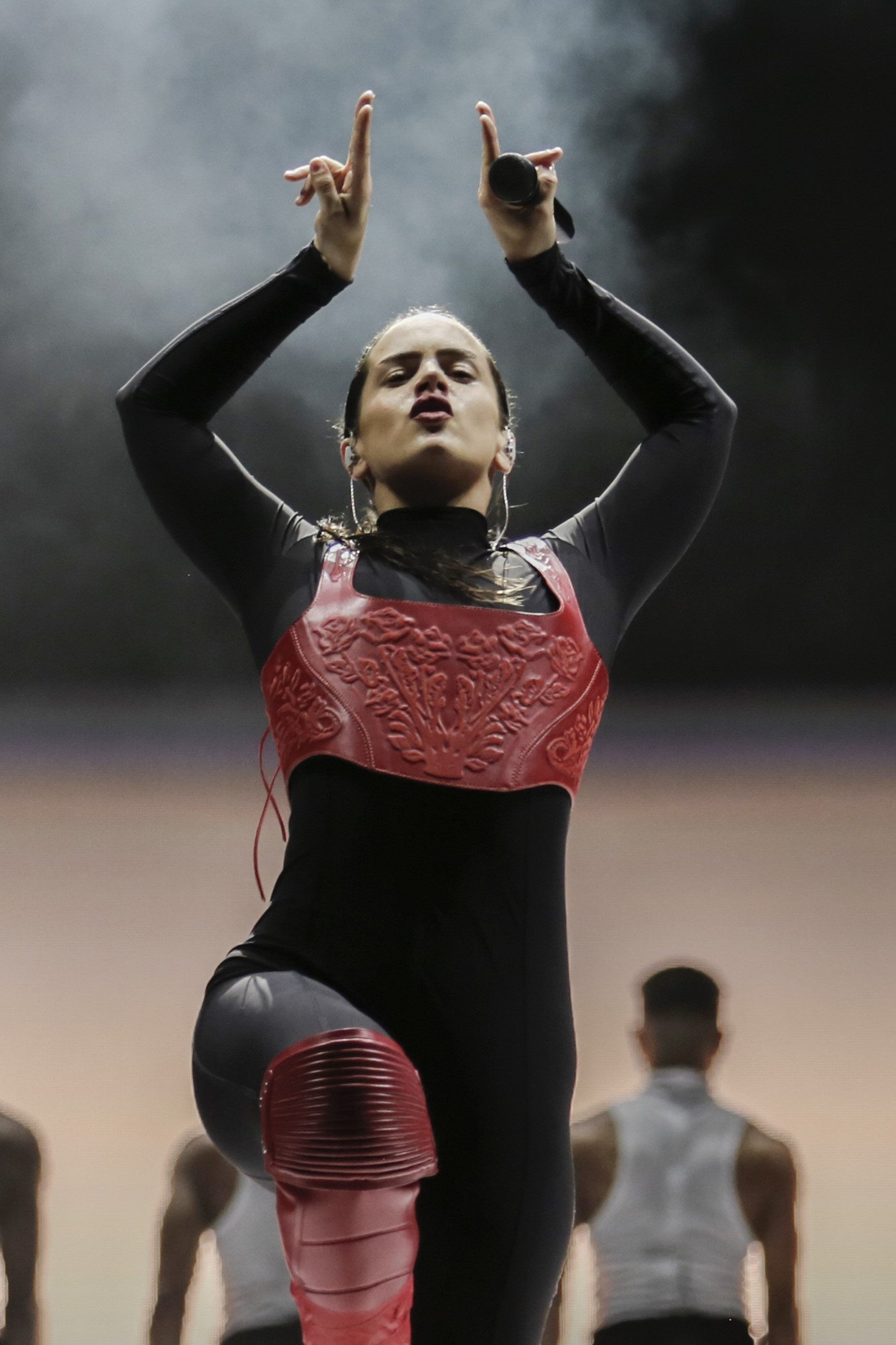
- Rosalía performing in Mexico City (2023)
- Concert tours: 4
- One-off concerts: 3
- Music festivals: 57
- Award shows: 19
- TV shows and specials: 19
- Radio shows and specials: 4
- Other live performances: 5

Spanish singer-songwriter Rosalía has released three studio albums since her debut in 2017. This has resulted in three concert tours (two of them worldwide), and several live television and award shows performances, as well as headlining spots at music festivals. Upon the release of her debut album Los Ángeles, Rosalía embarked on a 44-show concert cycle alongside Raül Refree that visited Spain, Portugal, Canada, the United States and Switzerland. She started to perform at small music and poetry festivals and flamenco-centered events.

Following Rosalía's breakthrough and entrance in the mainstream with "Malamente", she started to perform at bigger venues, was more frequently on television and at music festivals around Europe. To promote her second studio album El Mal Querer (2018), Rosalía partnered with Red Bull to hold a successful album release concert at Plaza de Colón, in Madrid. She parallelly became a frequent performer on the MTV stage, also attending several award shows. In 2019, Rosalía embarked on her second concert tour, El Mal Querer Tour. She performed 43 shows and visited mostly music festivals in South America, North America and Europe, including Coachella, Glastonbury and Lollapalooza among others and served as a headliner at BBK Live and Primavera Sound. It also had select dates in auditoriums around Europe and North America, and the tour's final leg meant Rosalía's first performances in indoor arenas.

The release of her third studio album Motomami was accompanied by the virtual TikTok show Motomami Live which attracted over four million users. In 2022, Rosalía embarked on the Motomami World Tour to promote the album. It visited indoor arenas around Europe and the Americas in a 46-show run, which was attended by 443,000 people and grossed 33.7 million dollars, and it was followed by the festival leg of the tour three months after the arena tour ended, in which the singer served as a headliner in most of the festivals she sang at. According to a press statement, the whole Motomami promotional run had a combined attendance of nearly 2 million people worldwide, and visited 21 countries across three continents in a 68-show run.

After the release of her fourth studio album Lux, Rosalía embarked on the Lux Tour in 2026 to promote the album. It was her first all-arena tour and visited 17 countries across Europe, North America and South America, maintaining a 100% attendance rate across all 57 shows and grossing a reported 42.88 million from only 27 of its 57 dates.

== Concert tours ==
Title	Dates	Associated album(s)	Continent(s)	Shows	Gross	Attendance
Los Ángeles Tour	11 February 2017 – 14 April 2018	Los Ángeles	Europe; North America	44		
Los Ángeles Tour setlist: 1. "Si Tú Supieras Compañero"; 2. "Aunque es de Noche"; 3. "Nos Quedamos Solitos"; 4. "Por Mi Puerta No Lo Pasen"; 5. "Que Se Muere Que Se Muere"; 6. "Catalina"; 7. "Día 14 de Abril"; 8. "La Hija de Juan Simón"; 9. "Por Castigarme Tan Fuerte"; 10. "Te Venero"; 11. "Llanto del Sacromonte"; 12. "Que Nadie Vaya a Llorar"; 13. "De Plata"; 14. "I See a Darkness"
El Mal Querer Tour	29 March 2019 – 10 December 2019	El Mal Querer	Latin America; North America; Europe	43	$4.6 million	96,438
El Mal Querer Tour setlist: 1. "Pienso en tu mirá" 2. "A Palé"; 3. "De madrugá" 4. "Barefoot in the Park"; 5. "Que no salga la luna" 6. "Maldición"; 7. "Catalina"; 8. "Aunque es de noche" 9. "Te estoy amando locamente" (Las Grecas cover); 10. "Di mi nombre" 11. "De aquí no sales" 12. "Milionària"; 13. "Dios nos libre del dinero" 14. "Bagdad"; 15. "Brillo"; 16. "Como Alí"; 17. "No me llames más que ya no voy" (Rodolfo Parrita cover); 18. "Lo presiento" (includes elements of "Es un secreto" by Plan B); 19. "Yo x Ti, Tu x Mi"; 20. "Con altura" 21. "A ningún hombre" 22. "Aute Cuture"; 23. "Malamente"
Motomami World Tour	6 July 2022 – 18 December 2022	Motomami	Europe; Latin America; North America	46	$30.4 million	440,703
Motomami World Tour setlist: 1. "Saoko"; 2. "Candy"; 3. "Bizcochito"; 4. "La Fama"; 5. "Dolerme"; 6. "De aquí no sales" / "Bulerías"; 7. "Motomami"; 8. "G3 N15"; 9. "Linda"; 10. "La Noche de Anoche"; 11. "Diablo"; 12. "Hentai"; 13. "Pienso en tu mirá" 14. "Perdóname" (La Factoría and Eddy Lover cover); 15. "De Plata"; 16. "Abcdefg"; 17. "La Combi Versace"; 18. "Relación (remix)" / "TKN" / "Yo x Ti, Tú x Mi"; 19. "Despechá"; 20. "Aislamiento"; 21. "Blinding Lights (remix)" 22. "Dinero y Libertad"; 23. "Como un G"; 24. "Malamente"; 25. "LAX"; 26. "Delirio de Grandeza"; 27. "Con Altura"; 28. "Chicken Teriyaki"; 29. "Sakura"; 30. "CUUUUuuuuuute"
Lux Tour	16 March 2026 – 16 September 2026	Lux	Europe; Latin America; North America	57		
Lux Tour setlist: 1. "Sexo, Violencia y Llantas"; 2. "Reliquia"; 3. "Porcelana"; 4. "Divinize"; 5. "Mio Cristo Piange Diamanti"; 6. "Berghain"; 7. "Saoko"; 8. "La Fama"; 9. "La Combi Versace"; 10. "De Madrugá"; 11. "El Redentor"; 12. "Can't Take My Eyes Off You" (Frankie Valli cover); 13. "La Perla"; 14. "Sauvignon Blanc"; 15. "La Yugular"; 16. "Dios Es un Stalker"; 17. "La Rumba del Perdón"; 18. "CUUUUuuuuuute"; 19. "Bizcochito"; 20. "Despechá"; 21. "Focu 'Ranni"; 22. "Magnolias"

== One-off concerts ==
Date	Name	Event	City	Performed song(s)	Ref.
31 October 2018	Red Bull Presents: Rosalía 'El Mal Querer'	Album release concert	Madrid	"Maldición" · "De Madrugá" · "Lo Presiento" · "Bagdad" · "Catalina" · "De Aquí No Sales" · "Di Mi Nombre" · "Pienso en tu Mirá" · "A Ningún Hombre" · "Aute Cuture" · "Malamente"	
17 March 2022	Motomami (Tiktok Live Performance)	Album release concert	London (Note: The concert was recorded in London and broadcast on TikTok.)	"Saoko" · "Candy" · "La Fama" · "Bulerías" · "Chicken Teriyaki" · "Hentai" · "Bizcochito" · "G3 N15" · "Motomami" · "Diablo" · "Abcdefg" · "La Combi Versace" · "Como Un G" · "CUUUUuuuuuute"	
28 April 2023	Rosalía en el Zócalo	Free concert	Mexico City	"Saoko" · "Bizcochito" · "La Fama" · "De Aquí No Sales / Bulerías" · "La Noche de Anoche" · "Linda" · "Diablo" · "Despechá" · "LLYLM" · "Blinding Lights (Remix)" · "La Llorona" · "Hentai" · "Candy" · "Motomami" · "La Combi Versace" · "Con Altura" · "Beso" · "Vampiros" · "Héroe" · "Malamente" · "Chicken Teriyaki" · "CUUUUuuuuuute"	

== Music festivals ==
Date	Event	City	Performed song(s)
25 January 2017	Flamenco Biënnale 2017	Amsterdam	"Si Tú Supieras Compañero" · "Aunque es de Noche" · "Nos Quedamos Solitos" · "Que Se Muere Que Se Muere" · "Día 14 de Abril" · "Por Mi Puerta No Lo Pasen" · "Por Castigarme Tan Fuerte" · "Catalina" · "La Hija de Juan Simón" · "De Plata" · "I See a Darkness"
3 June 2017	Primavera Sound 2017	Barcelona	"Si Tú Supieras Compañero" · "Aunque es de Noche" · "Nos Quedamos Solitos" · "Que Se Muere Que Se Muere" · "Día 14 de Abril" · "Por Mi Puerta No Lo Pasen" · "Por Castigarme Tan Fuerte" · "Catalina" · "La Hija de Juan Simón" · "De Plata" · "I See a Darkness"
1 July 2017	Vida Festival 2017	Vilanova i la Geltrú	"Si Tú Supieras Compañero" · "Aunque es de Noche" · "Nos Quedamos Solitos" · "Que Se Muere Que Se Muere" · "Día 14 de Abril" · "Por Mi Puerta No Lo Pasen" · "Por Castigarme Tan Fuerte" · "Catalina" · "La Hija de Juan Simón" · "De Plata" · "I See a Darkness"
4 July 2017	2017 Montreal International Jazz Festival	Montreal	"Si Tú Supieras Compañero" · "Aunque es de Noche" · "Nos Quedamos Solitos" · "Que Se Muere Que Se Muere" · "Día 14 de Abril" · "Por Mi Puerta No Lo Pasen" · "Por Castigarme Tan Fuerte" · "Catalina" · "La Hija de Juan Simón" · "De Plata" · "I See a Darkness"
16 July 2017	La Mar de Músicas 2017	Cartagena	"Si Tú Supieras Compañero" · "Aunque es de Noche" · "Nos Quedamos Solitos" · "Que Se Muere Que Se Muere" · "Día 14 de Abril" · "Por Mi Puerta No Lo Pasen" · "Por Castigarme Tan Fuerte" · "Catalina" · "La Hija de Juan Simón" · "De Plata" · "I See a Darkness"
4 January 2018	Festival Santas Pascuas 2018	Pamplona	"Si Tú Supieras Compañero" · "Aunque es de Noche" · "Nos Quedamos Solitos" · "Que Se Muere Que Se Muere" · "Día 14 de Abril" · "Por Mi Puerta No Lo Pasen" · "Por Castigarme Tan Fuerte" · "Catalina" · "La Hija de Juan Simón" · "De Plata" · "I See a Darkness"
15 June 2018	Sónar 2018	Barcelona	"Malamente" · "Aunque es de Noche" · "Catalina" · "Que No Salga la Luna" · "Pienso en tu Mirá" · "A Ningún Hombre" · "De Aquí No Sales" · "Brillo" · "Nana" · "Bagdad" · "Aute Cuture" · "Malamente"
5 July 2018	Festival Cultura Inquieta	Getafe	"Maldición" · "Brillo" · "Catalina" · "Que No Salga la Luna" · "Pienso en tu Mirá" · "De Aquí No Sales" · "De Madrugá" · "Nana" · "A Ningún Hombre" · "Bagdad" · "Aute Cuture" · "Lo Presiento" · "Malamente"
31 July 2018	Semana Grande de Santiago	Santiago de Compostela	"Maldición" · "Brillo" · "Catalina" · "Que No Salga la Luna" · "Pienso en tu Mirá" · "De Aquí No Sales" · "De Madrugá" · "Nana" · "A Ningún Hombre" · "Bagdad" · "Aute Cuture" · "Lo Presiento" · "Malamente"
29 March 2019	Lollapalooza Argentina 2019	Buenos Aires	"Pienso en tu Mirá" · "Como Ali" · "Barefoot in the Park" · "De Madrugá" · "Catalina" · "Que No Salga la Luna" · "Maldición" · "Te Estoy Amando Locamente" · "A Ningún Hombre" · "De Aquí No Sales" · "Di Mi Nombre" · "Bagdad" · "Brillo" · "Lo Presiento" · "Con Altura" · "Aute Cuture" · "Malamente"
31 March 2019	Lollapalooza Chile 2019	Santiago	"Pienso en tu Mirá" · "Como Ali" · "Barefoot in the Park" · "De Madrugá" · "Catalina" · "Que No Salga la Luna" · "Maldición" · "Te Estoy Amando Locamente" · "A Ningún Hombre" · "De Aquí No Sales" · "Di Mi Nombre" · "Bagdad" · "Brillo" · "Lo Presiento" · "Con Altura" · "Aute Cuture" · "Malamente"
6 April 2019	Ceremonia 2019	Toluca, Mexico	"Pienso en tu Mirá" · "Como Ali" · "Barefoot in the Park" · "De Madrugá" · "Catalina" · "Que No Salga la Luna" · "Maldición" · "Te Estoy Amando Locamente" · "A Ningún Hombre" · "De Aquí No Sales" · "Di Mi Nombre" · "Bagdad" · "Brillo" · "Lo Presiento" · "Con Altura" · "Aute Cuture" · "Malamente"
12 & 19 April 2019	Coachella 2019	Indio, California	"Pienso en tu Mirá" · "Como Ali" · "Barefoot in the Park" · "De Madrugá" · "Catalina" · "Que No Salga la Luna" · "Maldición" · "Te Estoy Amando Locamente" · "A Ningún Hombre" · "De Aquí No Sales" · "Di Mi Nombre" · "Bagdad" · "Brillo" · "Lo Presiento" · "Con Altura" · "Aute Cuture" · "Malamente"
27 April 2019	Something in the Water 2019	Virginia Beach	"Pienso en tu Mirá" · "Como Ali" · "Barefoot in the Park" · "De Madrugá" · "Catalina" · "Que No Salga la Luna" · "Maldición" · "Te Estoy Amando Locamente" · "A Ningún Hombre" · "De Aquí No Sales" · "Di Mi Nombre" · "Bagdad" · "Brillo" · "Lo Presiento" · "Con Altura" · "Aute Cuture" · "Malamente"
1 June 2019 (Note: Rosalía served as the headliner for the 2019 edition of Primavera Sound in Barcelona, marking the singer's first ever headlining slot.)	Primavera Sound 2019	Barcelona	"Pienso en tu Mirá" · "Como Ali" · "Barefoot in the Park" · "De Madrugá" · "Catalina" · "Que No Salga la Luna" · "Maldición" · "Te Estoy Amando Locamente" · "A Ningún Hombre" · "De Aquí No Sales" · "Di Mi Nombre" · "Bagdad" · "Brillo" · "Lo Presiento" · "Con Altura" · "Aute Cuture" · "Malamente"
2 June 2019	We Love Green 2019	Paris	"Pienso en tu Mirá" · "Como Ali" · "Barefoot in the Park" · "De Madrugá" · "Catalina" · "Que No Salga la Luna" · "Maldición" · "Te Estoy Amando Locamente" · "A Ningún Hombre" · "De Aquí No Sales" · "Di Mi Nombre" · "Bagdad" · "Brillo" · "Lo Presiento" · "Con Altura" · "Aute Cuture" · "Malamente"
8 June 2019 (Note: Rosalía served as the headliner for the 2019 edition of NOS Primavera Sound in Porto, marking the singer's first headlining gig outside her home country.)	NOS Primavera Sound 2019	Porto	"Pienso en tu Mirá" · "Como Ali" · "Barefoot in the Park" · "De Madrugá" · "Catalina" · "Que No Salga la Luna" · "Maldición" · "Te Estoy Amando Locamente" · "A Ningún Hombre" · "De Aquí No Sales" · "Di Mi Nombre" · "Bagdad" · "Brillo" · "Lo Presiento" · "Con Altura" · "Aute Cuture" · "Malamente"
14 June 2019	O Son do Camiño 2019	Santiago de Compostela	"Pienso en tu Mirá" · "Como Ali" · "Barefoot in the Park" · "De Madrugá" · "Catalina" · "Que No Salga la Luna" · "Maldición" · "Te Estoy Amando Locamente" · "A Ningún Hombre" · "De Aquí No Sales" · "Di Mi Nombre" · "Bagdad" · "Brillo" · "Lo Presiento" · "Con Altura" · "Aute Cuture" · "Malamente"
21 June 2019	Mawazine 2019	Rabat	"Pienso en tu Mirá" · "Como Ali" · "Barefoot in the Park" · "De Madrugá" · "Catalina" · "Que No Salga la Luna" · "Maldición" · "Te Estoy Amando Locamente" · "A Ningún Hombre" · "De Aquí No Sales" · "Di Mi Nombre" · "Bagdad" · "Brillo" · "Lo Presiento" · "Con Altura" · "Aute Cuture" · "Malamente"
22 June 2019	Ritmos del Mundo 2019	Adeje, Canary Islands	"Pienso en tu Mirá" · "Como Ali" · "Barefoot in the Park" · "De Madrugá" · "Catalina" · "Que No Salga la Luna" · "Maldición" · "Te Estoy Amando Locamente" · "A Ningún Hombre" · "De Aquí No Sales" · "Di Mi Nombre" · "Bagdad" · "Brillo" · "Lo Presiento" · "Con Altura" · "Aute Cuture" · "Malamente"
28 June 2019	Glastonbury 2019	Pilton, England	"Pienso en tu Mirá" · "Como Ali" · "Barefoot in the Park" · "De Madrugá" · "Catalina" · "Que No Salga la Luna" · "Maldición" · "Te Estoy Amando Locamente" · "A Ningún Hombre" · "De Aquí No Sales" · "Di Mi Nombre" · "Bagdad" · "Brillo" · "Lo Presiento" · "Con Altura" · "Aute Cuture" · "Malamente"
30 June 2019	Rock Werchter 2019	Werchter, Belgium	"Pienso en tu Mirá" · "Como Ali" · "Barefoot in the Park" · "De Madrugá" · "Catalina" · "Que No Salga la Luna" · "Maldición" · "Te Estoy Amando Locamente" · "A Ningún Hombre" · "De Aquí No Sales" · "Di Mi Nombre" · "Bagdad" · "Brillo" · "Lo Presiento" · "Con Altura" · "Aute Cuture" · "Malamente"
3 July 2019	Roskilde Festival 2019	Roskilde, Denmark	"Pienso en tu Mirá" · "Como Ali" · "Barefoot in the Park" · "De Madrugá" · "Catalina" · "Que No Salga la Luna" · "Maldición" · "Te Estoy Amando Locamente" · "A Ningún Hombre" · "De Aquí No Sales" · "Di Mi Nombre" · "Bagdad" · "Brillo" · "Lo Presiento" · "Con Altura" · "Aute Cuture" · "Malamente"
5 July 2019	Open'er Festival 2019	Gdynia	"Pienso en tu Mirá" · "Como Ali" · "Barefoot in the Park" · "De Madrugá" · "Catalina" · "Que No Salga la Luna" · "Maldición" · "Te Estoy Amando Locamente" · "A Ningún Hombre" · "De Aquí No Sales" · "Di Mi Nombre" · "Bagdad" · "Brillo" · "Lo Presiento" · "Con Altura" · "Aute Cuture" · "Malamente"
7 July 2019	Down the Rabbit Hole 2019	Beuningen, Netherlands	"Pienso en tu Mirá" · "Como Ali" · "Barefoot in the Park" · "De Madrugá" · "Catalina" · "Que No Salga la Luna" · "Maldición" · "Te Estoy Amando Locamente" · "A Ningún Hombre" · "De Aquí No Sales" · "Di Mi Nombre" · "Bagdad" · "Brillo" · "Lo Presiento" · "Con Altura" · "Aute Cuture" · "Malamente"
10 July 2019	Mad Cool 2019	Madrid	"Pienso en tu Mirá" · "Como Ali" · "Barefoot in the Park" · "De Madrugá" · "Catalina" · "Que No Salga la Luna" · "Maldición" · "Te Estoy Amando Locamente" · "A Ningún Hombre" · "De Aquí No Sales" · "Di Mi Nombre" · "Bagdad" · "Brillo" · "Lo Presiento" · "Con Altura" · "Aute Cuture" · "Malamente"
12 July 2019 (Note: Served as a headliner.)	BBK Live 2019	Bilbao	"Pienso en tu Mirá" · "Como Ali" · "Barefoot in the Park" · "De Madrugá" · "Catalina" · "Que No Salga la Luna" · "Maldición" · "Te Estoy Amando Locamente" · "A Ningún Hombre" · "De Aquí No Sales" · "Di Mi Nombre" · "Bagdad" · "Brillo" · "Lo Presiento" · "Con Altura" · "Aute Cuture" · "Malamente"
18 July 2019	Gurtenfestival 2019	Bern	"Pienso en tu Mirá" · "Como Ali" · "Barefoot in the Park" · "De Madrugá" · "Catalina" · "Que No Salga la Luna" · "Maldición" · "Te Estoy Amando Locamente" · "A Ningún Hombre" · "De Aquí No Sales" · "Di Mi Nombre" · "Bagdad" · "Brillo" · "Lo Presiento" · "Con Altura" · "Aute Cuture" · "Malamente"
20 July 2019	Colors of Ostrava 2019	Ostrava	"Pienso en tu Mirá" · "Como Ali" · "Barefoot in the Park" · "De Madrugá" · "Catalina" · "Que No Salga la Luna" · "Maldición" · "Te Estoy Amando Locamente" · "A Ningún Hombre" · "De Aquí No Sales" · "Di Mi Nombre" · "Bagdad" · "Brillo" · "Lo Presiento" · "Con Altura" · "Aute Cuture" · "Malamente"
2 August 2019	Osheaga Festival 2019	Montreal	"Pienso en tu Mirá" · "Como Ali" · "Barefoot in the Park" · "De Madrugá" · "Catalina" · "Que No Salga la Luna" · "Maldición" · "Te Estoy Amando Locamente" · "A Ningún Hombre" · "De Aquí No Sales" · "Di Mi Nombre" · "Bagdad" · "Brillo" · "Lo Presiento" · "Con Altura" · "Aute Cuture" · "Malamente"
4 August 2019	Lollapalooza 2019	Chicago	"Pienso en tu Mirá" · "Como Ali" · "Barefoot in the Park" · "De Madrugá" · "Catalina" · "Que No Salga la Luna" · "Maldición" · "Te Estoy Amando Locamente" · "A Ningún Hombre" · "De Aquí No Sales" · "Di Mi Nombre" · "Bagdad" · "Brillo" · "Lo Presiento" · "Con Altura" · "Aute Cuture" · "Malamente"
31 August 2019	Budweiser Made in America 2019	Philadelphia	"Pienso en tu Mirá" · "Como Ali" · "Barefoot in the Park" · "De Madrugá" · "Catalina" · "Que No Salga la Luna" · "Maldición" · "Te Estoy Amando Locamente" · "A Ningún Hombre" · "De Aquí No Sales" · "Di Mi Nombre" · "Bagdad" · "Brillo" · "No Me Llames Más Que Ya No Voy" · "Yo x Ti, Tu x Mi" · "Con Altura" · "Aute Cuture" · "Malamente"
6 & 13 October 2019	Austin City Limits 2019	Austin	"Pienso en tu Mirá" · "Como Ali" · "Barefoot in the Park" · "De Madrugá" · "Catalina" · "Que No Salga la Luna" · "Maldición" · "Te Estoy Amando Locamente" · "A Ningún Hombre" · "De Aquí No Sales" · "Di Mi Nombre" · "Bagdad" · "Brillo" · "No Me Llames Más Que Ya No Voy" · "Yo x Ti, Tu x Mi" · "Con Altura" · "Aute Cuture" · "Malamente"
9 November 2019	Astroworld 2019	Houston	"Pienso en tu Mirá" · "Como Ali" · "Barefoot in the Park" · "De Madrugá" · "Catalina" · "Que No Salga la Luna" · "Maldición" · "Te Estoy Amando Locamente" · "A Ningún Hombre" · "De Aquí No Sales" · "Di Mi Nombre" · "Bagdad" · "Brillo" · "No Me Llames Más Que Ya No Voy" · "Yo x Ti, Tu x Mi" · "Con Altura" · "Aute Cuture" · "Malamente"
11 January 2020	Calibash 2020	Los Angeles	"Pienso en tu Mirá" · "A Palé" · "Catalina" · "De Madrugá" · "Brillo" · "Yo x Ti, Tu x Mi" · "Con Altura" · "Malamente"
24 September 2022	Global Citizen Festival 2022	New York City	"La Fama" · "Hentai" · "Delirio de Grandeza" · "Candy"
22 October 2022 (Note: Rosalía served as the headliner for the 2022 edition of the III Points Festival in Miami, marking the singer's first headlining gig in North America.)	III Points Festival 2022	Miami	"Saoko" · "Candy" · "Bizcochito" · "La Fama" · "De Aquí No Sales / Bulerías" · "Motomami" · "G3 N15" · "Linda" · "La Noche de Anoche" · "Hentai" · "La Combi Versace" · "Relación / TKN / Yo x Ti, Tu x Mi / Gasolina" · "Despechá" · "Malamente" · "Delirio de Grandeza" · "LAX" · "Con Altura" · "Chicken Teriyaki" · "CUUUUuuuuuute"
17 March 2023 (Note: Rosalía served as the headliner for the 2023 edition of Lollapalooza Argentina, marking the singer's first headlining gig in Latin America.)	Lollapalooza Argentina 2023	Buenos Aires	"Saoko" · "Bizcochito" · "La Fama" · "De Aquí No Sales / Bulerías" · "La Noche de Anoche" · "Linda" · "Diablo" · "Despechá" · "LLYLM" · "Blinding Lights (Remix)" · "Hentai" · "Candy" · "Motomami" · "Pienso en tu Mirá" · "La Combi Versace" · "Con Altura" · "Héroe" · "Malamente" · "Chicken Teriyaki" · "CUUUUuuuuuute"
18 March 2023	Lollapalooza Chile 2023	Santiago	"Saoko" · "Bizcochito" · "La Fama" · "De Aquí No Sales / Bulerías" · "La Noche de Anoche" · "Linda" · "Diablo" · "Despechá" · "LLYLM" · "Blinding Lights (Remix)" · "Hentai" · "Candy" · "Motomami" · "Pienso en tu Mirá" · "La Combi Versace" · "Con Altura" · "Héroe" · "Malamente" · "Chicken Teriyaki" · "CUUUUuuuuuute"
22 March 2023	Asunciónico 2023	Asunción	"Saoko" · "Bizcochito" · "La Fama" · "De Aquí No Sales / Bulerías" · "La Noche de Anoche" · "Linda" · "Diablo" · "Despechá" · "LLYLM" · "Blinding Lights (Remix)" · "Hentai" · "Candy" · "Motomami" · "Pienso en tu Mirá" · "La Combi Versace" · "Con Altura" · "Héroe" · "Malamente" · "Chicken Teriyaki" · "CUUUUuuuuuute"
24 March 2023	Estéreo Picnic 2023	Bogotá	"Saoko" · "Bizcochito" · "La Fama" · "De Aquí No Sales / Bulerías" · "La Noche de Anoche" · "Linda" · "Diablo" · "Despechá" · "LLYLM" · "Blinding Lights (Remix)" · "Hentai" · "Candy" · "Motomami" · "Pienso en tu Mirá" · "La Combi Versace" · "Con Altura" · "Beso" · "Héroe" · "Malamente" · "Chicken Teriyaki" · "CUUUUuuuuuute"
26 March 2023	Lollapalooza Brazil 2023	São Paulo	"Saoko" · "Bizcochito" · "La Fama" · "De Aquí No Sales / Bulerías" · "La Noche de Anoche" · "Linda" · "Diablo" · "Despechá" · "LLYLM" · "Blinding Lights (Remix)" · "Hentai" · "Candy" · "Motomami" · "Pienso en tu Mirá" · "La Combi Versace" · "Con Altura" · "Beso" · "Héroe" · "Malamente" · "Chicken Teriyaki" · "CUUUUuuuuuute"
2 April 2023	Ceremonia 2023	Mexico City	"Saoko" · "Bizcochito" · "La Fama" · "De Aquí No Sales / Bulerías" · "La Noche de Anoche" · "Linda" · "Diablo" · "Despechá" · "LLYLM" · "Blinding Lights (Remix)" · "Hentai" · "Candy" · "Motomami" · "Pienso en tu Mirá" · "La Combi Versace" · "Con Altura" · "Beso" · "Vampiros" · "Héroe" · "Malamente" · "Chicken Teriyaki" · "CUUUUuuuuuute"
15 & 22 April 2023	Coachella 2023	Indio, California	"Saoko" · "Bizcochito" · "La Fama" · "De Aquí No Sales / Bulerías" · "La Noche de Anoche" · "Linda" · "Diablo" · "Despechá" · "LLYLM" · "Blinding Lights (Remix)" · "Hentai" · "Candy" · "Motomami" · "Pienso en tu Mirá" · "La Combi Versace" · "Con Altura" · "Beso" · "Vampiros" · "Héroe" · "Malamente" · "Chicken Teriyaki" · "CUUUUuuuuuute"
3 June 2023	Primavera Sound 2023	Barcelona	"Saoko" · "Bizcochito" · "La Fama" · "De Aquí No Sales / Bulerías" · "La Noche de Anoche" · "Linda" · "Diablo" · "Despechá" · "Hentai" · "Candy" · "Motomami" · "Pienso en tu Mirá" · "La Combi Versace" · "Con Altura" · "Beso" · "Vampiros" · "Héroe" · "Malamente" · "Chicken Teriyaki" · "CUUUUuuuuuute"
8 June 2023	NOS Primavera Sound 2023	Porto	"Saoko" · "Bizcochito" · "La Fama" · "De Aquí No Sales / Bulerías" · "La Noche de Anoche" · "Linda" · "Diablo" · "Despechá" · "Hentai" · "Candy" · "Motomami" · "Pienso en tu Mirá" · "La Combi Versace" · "Con Altura" · "Beso" · "Vampiros" · "Héroe" · "Malamente" · "Chicken Teriyaki" · "CUUUUuuuuuute"
10 June 2023	Primavera Sound Madrid 2023	Arganda del Rey	"Saoko" · "Bizcochito" · "La Fama" · "De Aquí No Sales / Bulerías" · "La Noche de Anoche" · "Linda" · "Diablo" · "Despechá" · "Hentai" · "Candy" · "Motomami" · "Pienso en tu Mirá" · "La Combi Versace" · "Con Altura" · "Beso" · "Vampiros" · "Héroe" · "Malamente" · "Chicken Teriyaki" · "CUUUUuuuuuute"
20 June 2023	Release Athens 2023	Athens	"Saoko" · "Bizcochito" · "La Fama" · "De Aquí No Sales / Bulerías" · "La Noche de Anoche" · "Linda" · "Diablo" · "Despechá" · "Hentai" · "Candy" · "Motomami" · "Pienso en tu Mirá" · "La Combi Versace" · "Con Altura" · "Beso" · "Vampiros" · "Héroe" · "Malamente" · "Chicken Teriyaki" · "CUUUUuuuuuute"
23 June 2023	I-Days 2023 Coca Cola	Milan	"Saoko" · "Bizcochito" · "La Fama" · "De Aquí No Sales / Bulerías" · "La Noche de Anoche" · "Linda" · "Diablo" · "Despechá" · "Hentai" · "Candy" · "Motomami" · "Pienso en tu Mirá" · "La Combi Versace" · "Con Altura" · "Beso" · "Vampiros" · "Héroe" · "Malamente" · "Chicken Teriyaki" · "CUUUUuuuuuute"
30 June 2023	Roskilde Festival 2023	Roskilde, Denmark	"Saoko" · "Bizcochito" · "La Fama" · "De Aquí No Sales / Bulerías" · "La Noche de Anoche" · "Linda" · "Diablo" · "Despechá" · "Hentai" · "Candy" · "Motomami" · "Pienso en tu Mirá" · "La Combi Versace" · "Con Altura" · "Beso" · "Vampiros" · "Héroe" · "Malamente" · "Chicken Teriyaki" · "CUUUUuuuuuute"
2 July 2023	Rock Werchter 2023	Werchter, Belgium	"Saoko" · "Bizcochito" · "La Fama" · "De Aquí No Sales / Bulerías" · "La Noche de Anoche" · "Linda" · "Diablo" · "Despechá" · "Hentai" · "Candy" · "Motomami" · "Pienso en tu Mirá" · "La Combi Versace" · "Con Altura" · "Beso" · "Vampiros" · "Héroe" · "Malamente" · "Chicken Teriyaki" · "CUUUUuuuuuute"
7 July 2023	Granca Live Fest 2023	Las Palmas, Canary Islands	"Saoko" · "Bizcochito" · "La Fama" · "De Aquí No Sales / Bulerías" · "La Noche de Anoche" · "Linda" · "Diablo" · "Despechá" · "Hentai" · "Candy" · "Motomami" · "Pienso en tu Mirá" · "La Combi Versace" · "Con Altura" · "Beso" · "Vampiros" · "Héroe" · "Malamente" · "Chicken Teriyaki" · "CUUUUuuuuuute"
9 July 2023	Les Déferlantes Sud de France 2023	Céret, France	"Saoko" · "Bizcochito" · "La Fama" · "De Aquí No Sales / Bulerías" · "La Noche de Anoche" · "Linda" · "Diablo" · "Despechá" · "Hentai" · "Candy" · "Motomami" · "Pienso en tu Mirá" · "La Combi Versace" · "Con Altura" · "Beso" · "Vampiros" · "Héroe" · "Malamente" · "Chicken Teriyaki" · "CUUUUuuuuuute"
13 July 2023	Gurtenfestival 2023	Bern	"Saoko" · "Bizcochito" · "La Fama" · "De Aquí No Sales / Bulerías" · "La Noche de Anoche" · "Linda" · "Diablo" · "Despechá" · "Hentai" · "Candy" · "Motomami" · "Pienso en tu Mirá" · "La Combi Versace" · "Con Altura" · "Beso" · "Vampiros" · "Héroe" · "Malamente" · "Chicken Teriyaki" · "CUUUUuuuuuute"
15 July 2023	Vieilles Charrues 2023	Carhaix, France	"Saoko" · "Bizcochito" · "La Fama" · "De Aquí No Sales / Bulerías" · "La Noche de Anoche" · "Linda" · "Diablo" · "Despechá" · "Hentai" · "Candy" · "Motomami" · "Pienso en tu Mirá" · "La Combi Versace" · "Con Altura" · "Beso" · "Vampiros" · "Héroe" · "Malamente" · "Chicken Teriyaki" · "CUUUUuuuuuute"
19 July 2023	Paléo Festival 2023	Nyon, Switzerland	"Saoko" · "Bizcochito" · "La Fama" · "De Aquí No Sales / Bulerías" · "La Noche de Anoche" · "Linda" · "Diablo" · "Despechá" · "Hentai" · "Candy" · "Motomami" · "Pienso en tu Mirá" · "La Combi Versace" · "Con Altura" · "Beso" · "Vampiros" · "Héroe" · "Malamente" · "Chicken Teriyaki" · "CUUUUuuuuuute"
22 July 2023	Lollapalooza Paris 2023	Paris	"Saoko" · "Bizcochito" · "La Fama" · "De Aquí No Sales / Bulerías" · "La Noche de Anoche" · "Linda" · "Diablo" · "Despechá" · "Hentai" · "Candy" · "Motomami" · "Pienso en tu Mirá" · "La Combi Versace" · "Con Altura" · "Beso" · "Vampiros" · "Héroe" · "Malamente" · "Chicken Teriyaki" · "CUUUUuuuuuute"

== Award shows ==
Date	Event	City	Performed song(s)
17 January 2018	Premio Ruido 2018	Madrid	"Catalina"
2 November 2018	LOS40 Music Awards 2018	Madrid	"Malamente"
4 November 2018	MTV Europe Music Awards 2018	Bilbao	"De Aquí No Sales" / "Malamente"
15 November 2018	19th Annual Latin Grammy Awards	Las Vegas	"Malamente"
2 February 2019	34th Goya Awards	Seville	"Me Quedo Contigo" (Los Chunguitos cover)
25 April 2019	Billboard Latin Music Awards 2019	Las Vegas	"Con Altura"
26 August 2019	MTV Video Music Awards 2019	Newark	"A Ningún Hombre" / "Yo x Ti, Tu x Mi" / "Aute Cuture"
3 November 2019	MTV Europe Music Awards 2019	Seville	"Pienso en tu Mirá" / "Di Mi Nombre"
8 November 2019	LOS40 Music Awards 2019	Madrid	"Dios Nos Libre del Dinero"
14 November 2019	20th Annual Latin Grammy Awards	Las Vegas	"A Palé" / "Con Altura"
12 December 2019	Billboard Women in Music 2019	Los Angeles	"Catalina" / "Di Mi Nombre"
26 January 2020	62nd Annual Grammy Awards	Los Angeles	"Juro Que" / "Malamente"
23 September 2021	Billboard Latin Music Awards 2021	Miami	"Linda" (with Tokischa)
4 November 2022	LOS40 Music Awards 2022	Madrid	"La Fama"
17 November 2022	23rd Annual Latin Grammy Awards	Las Vegas	"Hentai" / "La Fama" / "Despechá"
18 November 2022	NRJ Music Awards 2022	Cannes	"Despechá"
16 November 2023	24th Annual Latin Grammy Awards	Seville	"Se Nos Rompió El Amor" (Rocío Jurado cover)
7 November 2025	Los 40 Music Awards 2025	Valencia	"Reliquia"
28 February 2026	Brit Awards 2026	Manchester	"Berghain" (with Björk and Heritage Orchestra)
12 November 2026	27th Annual Latin Grammy Awards	Las Vegas	

== TV shows and specials ==
Date	Event	City	Performed song(s)
9 February 2017	Àrtic	Barcelona	"Por Mi Puerta No Lo Pasen"
21 February 2017	Divendres	Barcelona	"Catalina"
15 March 2017	Late Motiv	Madrid	"Si Tú Supieras Compañero"
15 November 2017	Latin Recording Academy Person of the Year 2017	Las Vegas	"Cuando Nadie Me Ve" (Alejandro Sanz cover)
23 November 2017	Likes #0	Madrid	"Aunque es de Noche"
16 October 2018	Later... with Jools Holland	Maidstone	"Pienso en tu Mirá" · "Malamente"
5 November 2018	El Hormiguero	Madrid	"Bagdad"
8 November 2018	Late Motiv	Madrid	"Di Mi Nombre"
13 November 2019	Latin Recording Academy Person of the Year 2019	Las Vegas	"Es Por Ti" (Juanes cover)
8 February 2020	Austin City Limits	Austin	"Pienso en tu Mirá" · "Como Ali" · "Barefoot in the Park" · "De Madrugá" · "Catalina" · "Dios Nos Libre del Dinero" · "Que No Salga La Luna" · "Te Estoy Amando Locamente" · "A Ningún Hombre" · "De Aquí No Sales" · "Di Mi Nombre" · "Bagdad" · "Brillo" · "No Me Llames Más Que Ya No Voy" · "Lo Presiento" · "Yo x Ti, Tu x Mi" · "Con Altura" · "Aute Cuture" · "Malamente"
30 May 2020	Se Agradece	Miami	"La Llorona"
2 October 2020	Savage x Fenty, Vol. 2	Los Angeles	"Relación (remix)" · "TKN"
20 February 2021	Saturday Night Live	New York City	"La Noche de Anoche" (with Bad Bunny)
12 March 2022	Saturday Night Live	New York City	"Chicken Teriyaki" · "La Fama"
24 March 2022	Quotidien	Paris	"La Fama"
10 November 2025	La revuelta	Madrid	"La Perla" (a cappella)
16 November 2025	The Tonight Show Starring Jimmy Fallon	Los Angeles	"La Perla"
28 November 2025	Nadie Dice Nada	Buenos Aires	"La Perla" (a cappella)
29 January 2026	Concierto-Manifest x Palestina	Barcelona	"La Perla"
10 October 2026	Saturday Night Live	New York City	"Reliquia" · "Magnolias"

== Radio shows and specials ==
Date	Event	City	Performed song(s)
31 March 2017	El País	Madrid	"Si Tú Supieras Compañero" · "Catalina" · "Que Se Muere Que Se Muere"
21 April 2017	Cadena SER	Madrid	"Si Tú Supieras Compañero" · "Catalina"
6 November 2018	Cadena SER	Madrid	"Maldición" · "Di Mi Nombre"
4 April 2019	EXA TV	Mexico City	"Di Mi Nombre"

== Other live performances ==
Date	Event	City	Performed song(s)
14 November 2017	Los Producers Charity Show	Las Vegas	"Volver"
12 September 2018	Latin Grammy Nominations Party	Miami	"Malamente"
29 September 2018	Bienal de Flamenco	Seville	
3 December 2021	Miami Art Basel	Miami Beach	"La Fama" · "Di Mi Nombre" · "Delirio de Grandeza" · "A Ningún Hombre" · "Malamente"
19 January 2023	Louis Vuitton Men's Fall-Winter 2023 Fashion Show	Paris	"Candy" · "Saoko" · "De Aquí No Sales" · "De Plata" · "CUUUUuuuuuute"
9 May 2026	La Jarana en el Guadalquivir	Seville	"Reliquia" · "La Perla"
