= El Mal Querer Tour =

2019 concert tour by Rosalía

- Transcontinental tour by Rosalía
- Promotional poster for December arena shows
- Location: Africa • Europe • North America • South America
- Associated albums: El Mal Querer
- Start date: March 29, 2019
- End date: December 10, 2019
- Legs: 5
- No. of shows: 41

Rosalía concert chronology
- Los Ángeles Tour (2017–2018); El Mal Querer Tour (2019); Motomami World Tour (2022)

El Mal Querer Tour was the second concert tour by Spanish singer Rosalía, in support of her second studio album El Mal Querer (2018). The tour began on March 29, 2019 in Buenos Aires at the Hipódromo de San Isidro, as part of the 2019 Lollapalooza Argentina music festival. The tour mostly visited music festivals. The tour ended at the WiZink Center in Madrid on December 10, 2019 after 41 shows.

== Background ==
Even though Rosalía's professional music debut was made in late 2016, her international success came in mid-2018 after she released her platinum-certified single "Malamente" in May 2018 through Sony Music. The single became an instant smash and caught the eyes of the media and critics, who praised the Barcelona-born new flamenco singer for her "soft liquid velvet voice". British newspaper The Guardian even called her "the most exciting thing that is going to happen to music this 2018". Her second studio album, El Mal Querer, was released in November 2018. The singer performed at Los40 Music Awards as well as the 2018 MTV Europe Music Awards, which expanded her popularity outside of Spain.

In November 2018, after a lot of expectations about the singer's musical future, Lollapalooza announced that the festival would feature Rosalia's participation at the Argentine and Chilean editions, in March 2019. A couple weeks after the singer's Latin Grammy Award performance, she announced that she would be performing in more music festivals through 2019 such as the Ceremonia Festival in Mexico, the American alternative music festival Something in the Water and even Coachella in spring.

As of performances in Spain, Rosalía brought her world tour to her hometown, Barcelona, on the first of June as a headliner of the Primavera Sound 2019 edition. She also performed in Bilbao (as part of the BBK Live festival), Córdoba, Santiago de Compostela and Lleida. This European leg also included performances in Portugal, Poland, France, The Netherlands, Denmark and the United Kingdom, among others.

On March 19, 2019, the singer announced her first solo North American tour dates, set to begin in April. The solo leg includes concerts in cities like Los Angeles, San Francisco, Toronto and New York City. On March 22, 2019, tickets for these shows were opened to the general public. Due to popular demand, a second show was added in New York City for April 29, 2019. On March 20, it was announced that Rosalía would be performing at Lollapalooza Chicago on August 1. On April 16, 2019, the singer announced that the North American leg solo concerts would be opened by American musician serpentwithfeet.

On September 16, 2019, the singer announced two arena encore shows. Those tickets were available on Ticketmaster from September 20. The concerts were held on December 7 at the Palau Sant Jordi in Barcelona and on December 10 in Madrid. A theatre concert in London and another one in Paris were announced the same day. On November 21 the singer announced that the opening act for this concerts will be Antonio Moreno "Polito". On November 26 it was announced that the Megaland Music Festival (which was set to take place in Bogotá, Colombia on November 30) was postponed due to the ongoing Latin American Spring civil protest movement.

== Critical reception ==
The tour received positive reviews by critics. Christopher Weingarten wrote this for Stereogum after the tour's stop in Los Angeles in April 2019: Rosalía focus on her wildly untraditional take on a centuries-old form, she’s much more than a star of “new flamenco.” She’s an Jodorowsky-evoking avant-gardist, an ambassador for mutant techno, an R&B hook-crooner and quite possibly a pop star in the making. (...) Part pop show, part interpretive dance performance, part folk tradition showcase, part folk tradition detonator, part avant-techno show where she plays producer El Guincho’s sampler; Rosalía’s tour bravely charts what may be America’s next musical step. On December 4, 2019, Billboard named Rosalía's Webster Hall shows in New York City the second-best concert of 2019 in the United States. Tatiana Cirisano wrote: "Thankfully for all, the hype was --and is-- real. Rosalía electrified the venue with her presence, conjuring up a new mini world onstage with each song".

As for the European festival tour leg, Spanish newspaper ABC said that Rosalía's Primavera Sound show in Barcelona "was a triumphal comeback home that has made history by reuniting over 63,000 people The scenic design, with a minimalist and sober play of lights and a central cube from which the singer and six dancers responded with gymnastic movements to the dialogue of electronic bases and flamenco palms, only reinforced the impact of an exciting hand in hand between tradition and modernity, between deep respect for its formation". When Rosalía performed a sold-out solo concert at London's Somerset House, NME gave the show five out of five stars and said: "In 2019, Rosalía is everything you could want from a pop star. She’s professional and dedicated to her craft. Her setlist is tight and she warrants the deep cuts. The dance routines are flawless, and she’s by turns humble and terrifying: being able to flit between those two is important. [...] It’s a military-tight operation, but not a vapid one: the nature of Rosalía’s music demands that the artist herself takes it seriously so the desired effect takes hold…If Ariana Grande is pop’s vocal acrobat, Rosalía is its contortionist: she reaches the corners others can’t". About the solo stop at Brixton Academy, Lee Wakefield wrote for Clash that "what is witnessed in Brixton is not the achievement of an artist simply climbing the ranks. Fiercely unique and blisteringly confident, bolstered by an arsenal of infectious tunes that chop flamenco flourishes with more traditional pop elements, she delivers a live show worthy of the most prestigious of stages", resuming the show as a "courageous statement".

The solo tour stops were attended by many celebrities and public personalities such as Naomi Campbell, Jon Kortajarena, Kylie Jenner, Billie Eilish, Bad Bunny, Rauw Alejandro, Nathy Peluso, Gigi Hadid, Dua Lipa, Caetano Veloso, Riccardo Tisci, Pere Aragonès, Ada Colau and Belén Esteban, among others.

== Commercial performance ==
The tickets for the North American solo concert tour leg came out on March 22, 2019. The three solo shows in the United States sold out in less than an hour. A second show was added in New York City which tickets' blew up in less than half-an-hour. As for the European festival tour leg, the most attended concert was in Barcelona on the first of June. Over 63,000 saw Rosalía live at the Primavera Sound festival. During the Mad Cool festival performance in Madrid, 44,000 people were seeing the Catalan singer live.

On September 18, 2019 the presale for Rosalía's arena shows in Madrid and Barcelona sold 1,000 tickets in a couple minutes, collapsing the Live Nation website. The general sale of the tickets opened on September 20. The dates in Paris, Madrid and Barcelona sold out in less than two hours. A controverse including ticket resale websites like StubHub pushed Rosalía to add a second date in Barcelona for December 8, 2019 that same day. Tickets for the second date in Barcelona came out on September 23, 2019. The concert sold out in half an hour. The concert at the O2 Academy Brixton in London sold-out in a couple days. In the night of December 5, 2019, 500 additional tickets for the December 8 and 10 shows were released without previous announcement due to the phenomenal demand.

== Concert synopsis ==
The stage consists of a large flat black pallet with a smaller one on top of the principal one and a huge screen in the back which is used for visual support and interludes. For the December shows, the top pallet was removed and a runway was added to the stage design. Rosalía and her backup dancers perform in the middle of the stage while the background singers are positioned on the left side of the stage meanwhile producer and friend Pablo Díaz Reixa aka "El Guincho" plays the drums and creates musical effects live on the right side of the stage. The concert starts with a video introduction showing Rosalía's name in different fonts which increases its velocity to the point that it collapses and shows a white image. Then Rosalía emerges from the stage to dance with her backup dancers popularly known as "Las 8 Rosas" (Spanish for "The 8 Roses") for over a minute and a half. After this, the singer is left alone on stage to shout the name of the city she is performing in and to sing the first notes of "Pienso en tu Mirá". After half-a-minute, the dancers come on stage again and they all dance together to the song, Rosalía included. After this song, Rosalía is left on stage alone for a second time to perform "A Palé". The setlist transits to "De Madrugá", the first unreleased song of the concert (it would be reworked with new lyrics and included on Rosalía's fourth album, Lux). Rosalía performs for another time with Las 8 Rosas before leaving her alone again to perform James Blake's "Barefoot in the Park". During this song, the singer asks the crowd to turn on their phones' lantern.

The next act starts with Rosalía singing the fan-favorite track "Que No Salga La Luna". She performs it without her dance crew. Her four background singers (2 men and 2 women) support Rosalía during the part where the song consists of a dialogue. "Que No Salga La Luna" is followed by "Maldición" where, instead of a falling diamonds background video, a solid light pink image is shown to the public. After the song, Rosalía introduces her 2016 track "Catalina", which she wrote alongside Catalan guitarist Raül Refree. She sings it "a capella" before transitioning to "Aunque es de noche". The act ends with a video interlude that consists of Rosalía writing a text to contact ">3" on iMessage. The message consists of the lyrics of the 1974 track "Te Estoy Amando Locamente" originally sung by Las Grecas. The video ends right after the singer sends the second text message which says "t estoy amando lokamente" followed by 232 red broken heart emojis. The track is sung by the background singers and is supported by a pre-taped version sung by Rosalía.

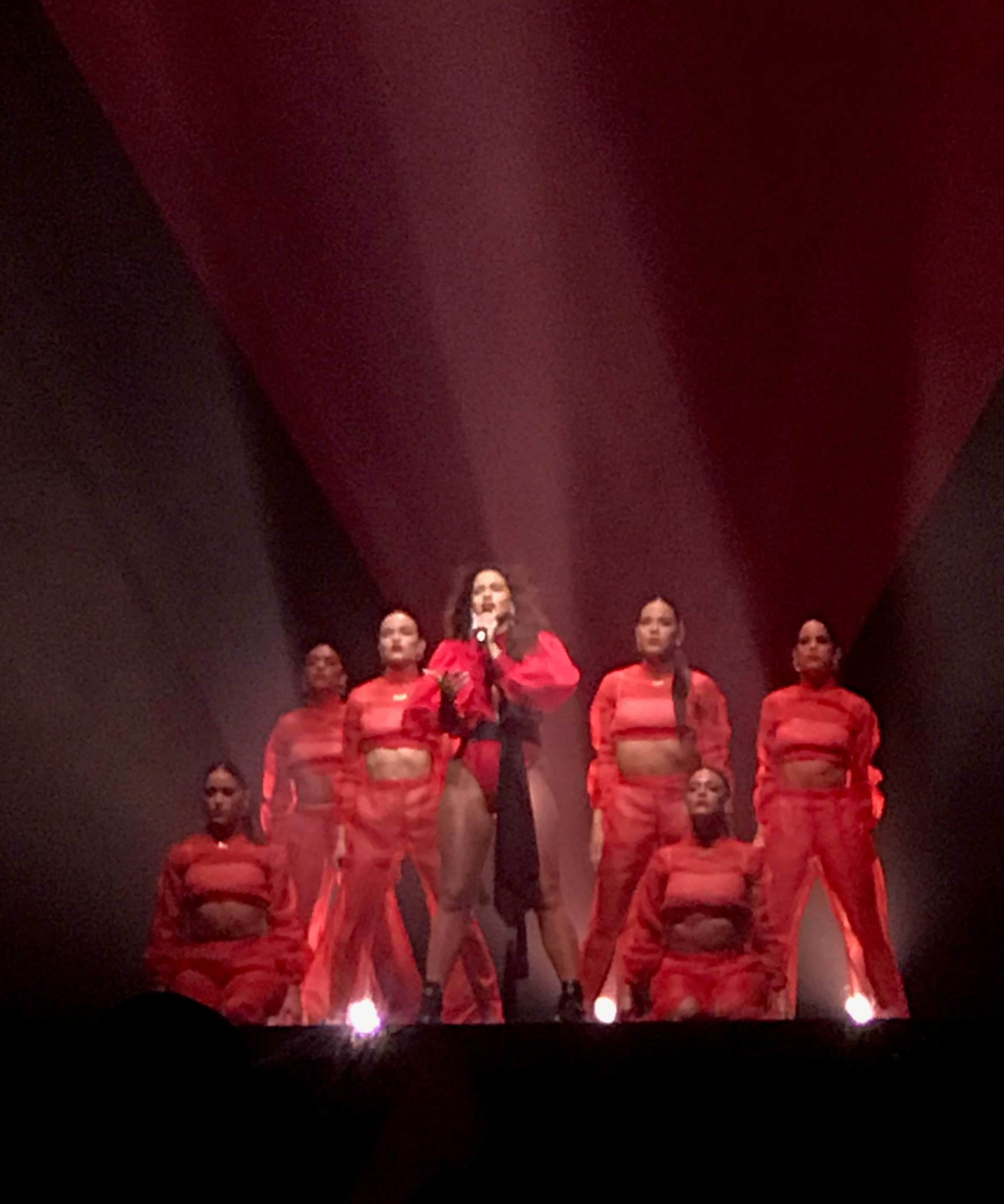
Rosalía performing in Barcelona.

The next act starts with Rosalía's first-ever number one single "Di Mi Nombre" which smoothly transits to "De Aquí No Sales". In both of the songs, the singer is joined by her dancers. Another interlude is shown to the public. This one consists of Rosalía singing an unreleased rap song with sunglasses on and without her long acrylic nails.

Right after the interlude, Rosalía performs her by now only track in Catalan "Milionària". The song is followed by its B-side "Dios Nos Libre del Dinero". The next song is "Bagdad" where she performs alongside "Las 8 Rosas", who "wrap" Rosalía in fuchsia strings while she sings. In some parts of the song, the singer changes her microphone to one that has an electronic effect that allows her to sing higher notes that may seem as autotune. She proceeds to perform J Balvin's "Brillo" where she puts on sunglasses and plays around with her hair alone. The unreleased track "Como Ali" is the following song. Her dancing crew accompanies her during this song. The act ends with a remix by El Guincho of Rodolfo Parrita's 2012 track "Cositas del Ayer" (also known as "No Me Llames Más Que Ya No Voy") which is choreographed by "Las 8 Rosas" and the singer herself. During the shows in festivals, the song was followed by "Santería" which was sung by the background singers.

The final act opens with the dancers entering a light blue hologram triangle to dance to Plan B's 2010 track "Es un Secreto". The song transitions right after Rosalía appears on stage to another unreleased track "Lo Presiento", which is rumored to be a discard of her 2018 album "El Mal Querer". After it, Rosalía interacts with the public and performs her collaboration with Ozuna "Yo x Ti, Tu x Mi". The choreography, created by Charm La'Donna, is the same one used for the music video and for the 2019 MTV Video Music Awards performance. The 2019 hit single "Con Altura" follows "Yo x Ti, Tu x Mi". In some concerts, Rosalía throws signed merchandising of her collection to the public after singing "Con Altura". Another fan-favorite "A Ningún Hombre" is performed right after the hit single. After this intimate and emotional song Rosalía proceeds to dance an almost-one-minute choreography before transitioning into another fan-favorite song: "Aute Cuture".

For the encore, Rosalía and her backup dancers dance to a march before transitioning to the singer's 2018 hit single "Malamente". A remix of the song created by El Guincho starts playing while Rosalía introduces her on-stage collaborators to the public and thanks the audience before leaving shortly after.

The concert lasts for 45–55 minutes for festivals and for 75–90 minutes for theatre and arena shows.

== Set list ==
=== Festivals and North America shows ===
1. "Pienso en tu mirá"
2. "Como Alí"
3. "Barefoot in the Park"
4. "De madrugá"
5. "Catalina"
6. "Que no salga la luna"
7. "Maldición"
8. "Te estoy amando locamente" (Las Grecas cover)
9. "A ningún hombre"
10. "De aquí no sales"
11. "Di mi nombre"
12. "Bagdad"
13. "Brillo"
14. "No me llames más que ya no voy" (Rodolfo Parrita cover)
15. "Lo presiento"
16. "Yo x Ti, Tu x Mi"
17. "Con altura"
18. "Aute Cuture"
19. "Malamente"

=== December shows ===
1. "Pienso en tu mirá"
2. "A Palé"
3. "De madrugá"
4. "Barefoot in the Park"
5. "Que no salga la luna"
6. "Maldición"
7. "Catalina"
8. "Aunque es de noche"
9. "Te estoy amando locamente" (Las Grecas cover)
10. "Di mi nombre"
11. "De aquí no sales"
12. "Milionària"
13. "Dios nos libre del dinero"
14. "Bagdad"
15. "Brillo"
16. "Como Alí"
17. "No me llames más que ya no voy" (Rodolfo Parrita cover)
18. "Lo presiento" (includes elements of "Es Un Secreto" by Plan B)
19. "Yo x Ti, Tu x Mi"
20. "Con altura"
21. "A ningún hombre"
22. "Aute Cuture"
23. "Malamente"

=== Notes ===
- During the shows in San Francisco, Virginia Beach and Córdoba, Rosalía performed "Volver" by Carlos Gardel.
- During the July shows in Madrid and London Rosalía performed "Milionària".
- During the shows in Bilbao, London, Bern, Ostrava and Austin (night two), Rosalía performed "Dio$ No$ Libre del Dinero".
- Starting with the show in Philadelphia, "Lo presiento" was removed from the setlist and replaced with "Yo x Ti, Tu x Mi".
- Starting with the December show in Paris, "A Palé" and "Aunque es de Noche" were added to the setlist.
- During the last show in Madrid, Rosalía performed "Yo x Ti, Tu x Mi" with Ozuna.

== Tour dates ==
List of concerts, showing date, city, country, venue, opening acts, tickets sold, number of available tickets and gross revenue
Date	City	Country	Venue	Opening acts	Attendance	Revenue
South America
March 29, 2019 (Note: The concert on March 29 at the Hipódromo de San Isidro in Buenos Aires is part of Lollapalooza Argentina.)	Buenos Aires	Argentina	Hipódromo de San Isidro	—N/a	—N/a	—N/a
March 31, 2019 (Note: The concert on March 31, 2019 at the O'Higgins Park in Santiago is part of Lollapalooza Chile.)	Santiago	Chile	Parque O'Higgins	—N/a	—N/a	—N/a
North America
April 6, 2019 (Note: The concert on April 6, 2019 at the Foro Pegaso in Toluca is part of Festival Ceremonia.)	Toluca	Mexico	Foro Pegaso	—N/a	—N/a	—N/a
April 12, 2019 (Note: The concerts on April 12 and April 19, 2019, at the Empire Polo Club in Indio are part of the Coachella Valley Music and Arts Festival.)	Indio	United States	Empire Polo Club	—N/a	—N/a	—N/a
April 17, 2019	Los Angeles	United States	The Mayan	serpentwithfeet	1,718 / 1,718	$95,260
April 19, 2019	Indio	United States	Empire Polo Club	—N/a	—N/a	—N/a
April 22, 2019	San Francisco	United States	The Regency Ballroom	serpentwithfeet	1,423 / 1,423	$78,549
April 27, 2019 (Note: The concert on April 27, 2019 at the 5th Street Music Stage in Virginia Beach is part of the Something in the Water.)	Virginia Beach	United States	5th Street Beach Stage	—N/a	—N/a	—N/a
April 29, 2019	New York City	United States	Webster Hall	serpentwithfeet	3,054 / 3,054	$164,575
April 30, 2019	New York City	United States	Webster Hall	serpentwithfeet	3,054 / 3,054	$164,575
May 2, 2019	Toronto	Canada	Rebel	serpentwithfeet	2,411 / 2,411	$129,924
Europe
June 1, 2019 (Note: The concert on June 1, 2019 at the Parc del Fòrum in Barcelona is part of Primavera Sound.)	Barcelona	Spain	Parc del Fòrum	—N/a	—N/a	—N/a
June 2, 2019 (Note: The concert on June 2, 2019 at the Bois de Vicennes in Paris is part of We Love Green.)	Vincennes (Note: Labeled as Paris in promotional material.)	France	Bois de Vincennes	—N/a	—N/a	—N/a
June 8, 2019 (Note: The concert on June 8, 2019 at the Parque da Cidade in Porto is part of NOS Primavera Sound.)	Porto	Portugal	Parque da Cidade	—N/a	—N/a	—N/a
June 14, 2019 (Note: The concert on June 14, 2019 at the Monte do Gozo in Santiago de Compostela is part of O Son Do Camiño.)	Santiago	Spain	Monte do Gozo	—N/a	—N/a	—N/a
June 15, 2019 (Note: The concert on June 15, 2019 at the Plaza de Toros in Córdoba is part of Noche Blanca.)	Córdoba	Spain	Plaza de Toros de los Califas	—N/a	—N/a	—N/a
Africa
June 21, 2019 (Note: The concert on June 21, 2019 at the OLM Souissi in Rabat is part of the Mawazine Festival.)	Rabat	Morocco	OLM Souissi	—N/a	—N/a	—N/a
Europe
June 22, 2019 (Note: The concert on June 22, 2019 at the Golf Costa Adeje in Costa Adeje is part of the Ritmos del Mundo music festival.)	Tenerife	Spain	Golf Costa Adeje	—N/a	—N/a	—N/a
June 28, 2019 (Note: The concert on June 28, 2019 at the Worthy Farm in Pilton is part of Glastonbury Festival.)	Pilton	England	Worthy Farm	—N/a	—N/a	—N/a
June 30, 2019 (Note: The concert on June 30, 2019 at the Festivalpark in Werchter is part of Rock Werchter.)	Werchter	Belgium	Werchter Festival Grounds	—N/a	—N/a	—N/a
July 3, 2019 (Note: The concert on July 3, 2019 at the Festivalpladsen in Roskilde is part of Roskilde Festival.)	Roskilde	Denmark	Festivalpladsen	—N/a	—N/a	—N/a
July 5, 2019 (Note: The concert on July 5, 2019 at the Gdynia-Kosakowo Airport in Gdynia is part of Open'er Festival.)	Gdynia	Poland	Gdynia-Kosakowo Airport	—N/a	—N/a	—N/a
July 7, 2019 (Note: The concert on July 7, 2019 at De Groene Heuvels in Beuningen is part of the Down the Rabbit Hole.)	Beuningen	Netherlands	De Groene Heuvels	—N/a	—N/a	—N/a
July 10, 2019 (Note: The concert on July 10, 2019 at Espacio Mad Cool in Madrid part of the Mad Cool Festival.)	Madrid	Spain	Espacio Mad Cool	—N/a	—N/a	—N/a
July 12, 2019 (Note: The concert on July 12, 2019 at the Monte Cobetas in Bilbao is part of Bilbao BBK Live.)	Bilbao	Spain	Monte Cobetas	—N/a	—N/a	—N/a
July 15, 2019 (Note: The concert on July 15, 2019 at the Somerset House in London is part of Summer Concert Series.)	London	England	Somerset House	—N/a	—N/a	—N/a
July 18, 2019 (Note: The concert on July 18, 2019 at Gurten in Bern is part of Gurtenfestival.)	Bern	Switzerland	Gurten	—N/a	—N/a	—N/a
July 20, 2019 (Note: The concert on July 20, 2019 at the Dolní Vítkovice in Ostrava is part of the Colours of Ostrava.)	Ostrava	Czech Republic	Dolní Vítkovice	—N/a	—N/a	—N/a
North America
August 2, 2019 (Note: The concert on August 2, 2019 at the Parc Jean-Drapeau in Montreal is part of the Osheaga Festival.)	Montreal	Canada	Parc Jean-Drapeau	—N/a	—N/a	—N/a
August 4, 2019 (Note: The concert on August 4, 2019 at the Grant Park in Chicago is part of Lollapalooza.)	Chicago	United States	Grant Park	—N/a	—N/a	—N/a
August 30, 2019 (Note: The concert on August 30, 2019 at the American Airlines Arena in Miami is part of the Vive Latino Live concert series.)	Miami	United States	American Airlines Arena	—N/a	—N/a	—N/a
August 31, 2019 (Note: The concert on August 31, 2019 at the Benjamin Franklin Parkway in Philadelphia is part of Made in America Festival.)	Philadelphia	United States	Benjamin Franklin Parkway	—N/a	—N/a	—N/a
October 6, 2019 (Note: The concert on October 6, 2019 at the Zilker Park in Austin is part of the Austin City Limits Festival.)	Austin	United States	Zilker Park	—N/a	—N/a	—N/a
October 8, 2019	Austin	United States	Moody Theater	—N/a	—N/a	—N/a
October 13, 2019 (Note: The concert on October 13, 2019 at the Zilker Park in Austin is part of the Austin City Limits Festival.)	Austin	United States	Zilker Park	—N/a	—N/a	—N/a
November 9, 2019 (Note: The concert on November 9, 2019 at the NRG Park in Houston is part of Astroworld Festival.)	Houston	United States	NRG Park	—N/a	—N/a	—N/a
Europe
December 3, 2019	Paris	France	Salle Pleyel	Polito	2,346 / 2,346	$79,288
December 5, 2019	London	England	O_{2} Academy Brixton	Polito	4,951 / 4,951	$194,512
December 7, 2019	Barcelona	Spain	Palau Sant Jordi	Polito	31,175 / 31,175	$1,172,220
December 8, 2019	Barcelona	Spain	Palau Sant Jordi	Polito	31,175 / 31,175	$1,172,220
December 10, 2019	Madrid	Spain	WiZink Center	Polito	14,831 / 14,831	$563,627
Total					—	—

== Cancelled shows ==
List of cancelled concerts, showing date, city, country, venue and reason for cancellation
Date	City	Country	Venue	Reason
July 13, 2019 (Note: The concert on July 13, 2019 at the Circuit de Barcelona—Catalunya in Montmeló was supposed to be part of the 2019 Doctor Music Festival. The festival was set to be taking place at the Camps d'Escalarre in Lleida, but moved to Montmeló due to flood risks.)	Montmeló	Spain	Circuit de Barcelona-Catalunya	Festival cancellation
November 30, 2019 (Note: The concert on November 30, 2019 at the Parque Simón Bolívar in Bogotá was supposed to be part of the Megaland Music Festival.)	Bogotá	Colombia	Parque Simón Bolívar	Unstable public order due to protests

== Accolades ==
Gala	Category	Result	Ref.
ARC Awards	Best Tour by a Catalan Artist	Won	

== Personnel ==
Vocals

- Rosalía

Dancers

- Rosalía
- Paula Alcaina
- Elena Marín
- Beatriz Ortiz
- Natalia Palomares
- María Ríos
- Alicia Roca
- Luisina Sánchez
- Ainhoa Urrestilla

Musicians

- Rosalía
- Pablo Díaz-Reixa
- Antonio Montes Saavedra
- Manuel Montes Saavedra
- Claudia “La Chispa”
- Anna Colom
- Tobalo
- Ane Carrasco
- Makarines
- Los Nicos

Crew

- Tour Manager - Agustin Boffi
- Production Manager - Alejandro Agra
- Stage Manager - Alejandro Agra
- LD - Isabel Delmoral
- FOH Engineer - Brian Hernandez
- MON Engineer - Carlos del Valle
- System Engineer - Jose Mourin
- Ableton Live Tech - Unai Lascano
- Road Manager - Clara Millan / Solana Rivas
- PA - Noelia Aloe
