= NOS Primavera Sound 2019 =

The NOS Primavera Sound 2019 was held on 6 to 8 June 2019 at the Parque da Cidade, Porto, Portugal. The festival was headlined by Solange, Stereolab, J Balvin, Interpol, Erykah Badu, and Rosalía.

== Lineup ==
Headline performers are listed in boldface. Artists listed from latest to earliest set times.

=== NOS ===
Thursday, 6 June	Friday, 7 June	Saturday, 8 June
**Solange**; Danny Brown; Built to Spill; Christina Rosenvinge	James Blake; **J Balvin**; Courtney Barnett; Aldous Harding	**Erykah Badu**; **Rosalía**; Jorge Ben Jor; Hop Along

NOS headlining set lists
J Balvin
1. "Reggaetón"
2. "Machika"
3. "Con altura" (with Rosalía)
4. "X"
5. "Ginza"
6. "Safari"
7. "Oye mi canto"/"Rakata"
8. "Gasolina"
9. "Si tu novio te deja sola"
10. "Sensualidad"
11. "No es justo"
12. "Otra vez"
13. "Ay vamos"
14. "I Like It"
15. "Contra la pared" (with Sean Paul)
16. "Mi gente"
Erykah Badu
1. "Caint Use My Phone (Suite)"
2. "Hello"
3. "Appletree"
4. "Love of My Life (An Ode to Hip-Hop)"
5. "On & On"
6. "Window Seat"
7. "Out My Mind, Just in Time"
8. "I Want You"
9. "Umm Hmm"
10. "Green Eyes"
11. "Liberation"
12. "Humble Mumble"
13. "Ain't No Fun (If the Homies Can't Have None)"
14. "Bag Lady"
15. "Kiss Me on My Neck (Hesi)"
Rosalía
1. "Pienso en tu mirá"
2. "Como ali"
3. "Barefoot in the Park"
4. "De madrugá"
5. "Catalina"
6. "Que no salga la luna"
7. "Maldición"
8. "Te estoy amando locamente"
9. "A ningún hombre"
10. "De aquí no sales"
11. "Di mi nombre"
12. "Bagdad"
13. "Brillo"
14. "Lo presiento"
15. "Con altura"
16. "Aute cuture"
17. "Malamente"

=== Seat ===
Thursday, 6 June	Friday, 7 June	Saturday, 8 June
**Stereolab**; Jarvis Cocker introducing Jarv Is...; Ama Lou; Mai Kino	**Interpol**; Fucked Up; Mura Masa; Lisabö; Jambinai; Surma	Modeselektor (Live); Kae Tempest; Guided by Voices; Big Thief; Viagra Boys; O Terno

Seat headlining set lists
Stereolab
1. "Come and Play in the Milky Night"
2. "Brakhage"
3. "French Disko"
4. "Baby Lulu"
5. "Miss Modular"
6. "Metronomic Underground"
7. "Need to Be"
8. "Ping Pong"
9. "Percolator"
10. "Crest"
11. "Lo Boob Oscilator"
Interpol
1. "C'mere"
2. "If You Really Love Nothing"
3. "Public Pervert"
4. "PDA"
5. "Say Hello to the Angels"
6. "Length of Love"
7. "Fine Mess"
8. "Evil"
9. "Take You on a Cruise"
10. "All the Rage Back Home"
11. "Rest My Chemistry"
12. "The Rover"
13. "Slow Hands"
14. "Leif Erikson"
15. "Obstacle 1"
16. "Roland"

=== Super Bock ===
Thursday, 6 June	Friday, 7 June	Saturday, 8 June
Tommy Cash; MorMor; Men I Trust; Dino d'Santiago	Kali Uchis; Shellac; Nilüfer Yanya; ProfJam	Low; Amyl and the Sniffers; Lucy Dacus; Lena d'Água e Primeira Dama

=== Pull & Bear ===
Thursday, 6 June	Friday, 7 June	Saturday, 8 June
Peggy Gou; Let's Eat Grandma; Allen Halloween; Miya Folick	Sophie; JPEGMafia; David August; Liz Phair; Sons of Kemet XL; Nubya Garcia	Mykki Blanco; Yves Tumor (Full band); Neneh Cherry; Tirzah; Snail Mail; Tomberlin

=== Primavera Bits ===
Thursday, 6 June	Friday, 7 June	Saturday, 8 June
Yaeji; Job Jobse; Roza Terenzi; Photonz	Helena Hauff; Dr Rubinstein; Courtesy; Jasss; Violet	Nina Kraviz; Boddika; Joy Orbison; Mad Miran; Jackie

=== Radio Primavera Sound ===
Thursday, 6 June	Friday, 7 June	Saturday, 8 June
DJ Kitten	Indiespot DJ	DJ Coco
