= Primavera Sound 2019 =

Music festival in Spain

The Primavera Sound 2019 was held on 30 May to 1 June 2019 at the Parc del Fòrum, Barcelona, Spain. The festival was preceded by the event, Primavera a la Ciutat, which was located in the downtown Barcelona, featuring many performances including Big Red Machine, Deerhunter and Apparat.

The headliners included Erykah Badu, Tame Impala, Solange, Future, Miley Cyrus, J Balvin, Interpol, Janelle Monáe, and Rosalía. The 2019 lineup sought to highlight "gender equality, eclecticism and audacity", as deemed as the "New Normal", with 50/50 gender representation.

== Lineup ==
Headline performers are listed in boldface. Artists listed from latest to earliest set times.

=== Seat ===
Thursday, 30 May	Friday, 1 June	Saturday, 2 June
**Future**; **Interpol**; Mac DeMarco; The Mani-las	Robyn; **Miley Cyrus** (Note: Miley Cyrus replaced Cardi B as she cancelled her appearance due to "promotional commitments".); Carly Rae Jepsen; Pavvla	James Blake; **Solange**; Kali Uchis; Boy Pablo

Seat set lists
Future
1. "Bugatti"
2. "Same Damn Time"
3. "Crushed Up"
4. "Wifi Lit"
5. "Jumpman"
6. "New Level"
7. "Blasé"
8. "King's Dead"
9. "Stick Talk"
10. "Low Life"
11. "Fuck Up Some Commas"
12. "Mask Off"
Interpol
1. "C'mere"
2. "If You Really Love Nothing"
3. "Public Pervert"
4. "PDA"
5. "Say Hello to the Angels"
6. "Fine Mess"
7. "Evil"
8. "Take You on a Cruise"
9. "All the Rage Back Home"
10. "Rest My Chemistry"
11. "The Rover"
12. "Slow Hands"
13. "Leif Erikson"
14. "Obstacle 1"
15. "Roland"
Mac DeMarco
1. "On the Level"
2. "Salad Days"
3. "Nobody"
4. "The Stars Keep On Calling My Name"
5. "Little Dogs March"
6. "Cooking Up Something Good"
7. "K"
8. "Ode to Viceroy"
9. "Another One"
10. "Choo Choo"
11. "My Old Man"
12. "Rock and Roll Night Club"
13. "All of Our Yesterdays"
14. "Freaking Out the Neighborhood"
15. "The Cattleman's Prayer"
16. "My Kind of Woman"
17. "Chamber of Reflection"
Robyn
1. "Send to Robin Immediately"
2. "Honey"
3. "Indestructible"
4. "Ever Again"
5. "Be Mine!"
6. "Because It's in the Music"
7. "Love Is Free"
8. "Don't Fucking Tell Me What to Do"
9. "Dancing On My Own"
10. "Missing U"
11. "Call Your Girlfriend"
12. "With Every Heartbeat"
Miley Cyrus
1. "Nothing Breaks Like a Heart"
2. "Mother's Daughter"
3. "Unholy"
4. "Cattitude"
5. "D.R.E.A.M."
6. "We Can't Stop"
7. "Party Up the Street"
8. "Malibu"
9. "Jolene"
10. "Party in the U.S.A."
11. "Can't Be Tamed"
12. "Wrecking Ball"
Carly Rae Jepsen
1. "No Drug Like Me"
2. "Emotion"
3. "Run Away with Me"
4. "Julien"
5. "Boy Problems"
6. "Call Me Maybe"
7. "Now That I Found You"
8. "When I Needed You"
9. "Store"
10. "Too Much"
11. "I Really Like You"
12. "Want You in My Room"
13. "Party for One"
14. "Let's Get Lost"
15. "Cut to the Feeling"
Pavvla
1. "The World Stopped the Day You Were Born"
2. "Should've Known Better"
3. "None of the Above"
4. "This Is Not a Movie"
5. "GUNS"
6. "Unbreakable"
7. "Planets and Stars"
8. "Tired"
9. "Young"
10. "It Could Be"
11. "Burnt to Ashes"
12. "SKIN"
13. "Dance Alone"
14. "Something New"
15. "Secretly Hoping You Catch Me Looking"
James Blake
1. "Assume Form"
2. "Live Round Here"
3. "Timeless"
4. "Mile High"
5. "I'll Come Too"
6. "Barefoot in the Park"
7. "The Limit to Your Love"
8. "Are You in Love?"
9. "Can't Believe the Way We Flow"
10. "Loathe to Roam"
11. "Where's the Catch?"
12. "Voyeur"
13. "CMYK"
14. "Retrograde"
15. "Don't Miss It"
Solange
1. "Down with the Clique"
2. "Can I Hold the Mic (Interlude)"
3. "Stay Flo"
4. "Binz"
5. "Way to the Show"
6. "Mad"
7. "F.U.B.U."
8. "Nothing Without Intention (Interlude)"
9. "Almeda"
10. "I'm a Witness"
11. "Dreams"
12. "Cranes in the Sky"
13. "Losing You"
14. "Things I Imagined"
15. "Don't Touch My Hair"
16. "Rise"
Kali Uchis
1. "Loner"
2. "Dead to Me"
3. "Just a Stranger"
4. "Your Teeth in My Neck"
5. "Pobre diabla"
6. "Beautiful"
7. "Creep"
8. "Killer"
9. "Rush"
10. "Ridin' Round"
11. "Melting"
12. "Nuestro planeta"
13. "Gotta Get Up"
14. "After the Storm"
15. "Tyrant"
Boy Pablo
1. "Yeah (Fantasizing)"
2. "Feeling Lonely"
3. "Ready/Problems"
4. "Sick Feeling"
5. "Everytime"
6. "Losing You"
7. "tkm"
8. "50 Souls and a Discobowl"
9. "Dance, Baby!"

=== Pull&Bear ===
Thursday, 30 May	Friday, 1 June	Saturday, 2 June
**Erykah Badu**; Courtney Barnett; Big Thief	**Tame Impala**; **Janelle Monáe**; Kurt Vile & the Violators	**J Balvin**; **Rosalía**; Nathy Peluso

Pull&Bear set lists
Erykah Badu
1. "Hello"
2. "Hello It's Me"
3. "Out My Mind, Just in Time"
4. "I Want You"
5. "On & On"
6. "... & On"
7. "Love of My Life (An Ode to Hip-Hop)"
8. "Time's A Wastin"
9. "Appletree"
10. "Back in the Day (Puff)"
11. "Liberation"
12. "Window Seat"
13. "Kiss Me on My Neck (Hesi)"
14. "Otherside of the Game"
Courtney Barnett
1. "Avant Gardener"
2. "City Looks Pretty"
3. "Small Talk"
4. "Need a Little Time"
5. "Nameless, Faceless"
6. "I'm Not Your Mother, I'm Not Your Bitch"
7. "Crippling Self Doubt and a General Lack of Self Confidence"
8. "Small Poppies"
9. "Depreston"
10. "Are You Looking After Yourself?"
11. "Elevator Operator"
12. "Everybody Here Hates You"
13. "History Eraser"
14. "Charity"
15. "Nobody Really Cares If You Don't Go to the Party"
16. "Pedestrian at Best"
Big Thief
1. "Magic Dealer"
2. "Shark Smile"
3. "Not"
4. "Shoulders"
5. "Cattails"
6. "Mythological Beauty"
7. "Terminal Paradise"
8. "Pareidolia"
9. "Contact"
10. "Orange"
11. "Masterpiece"
12. "Mary"
Tame Impala
1. "Let It Happen"
2. "Patience"
3. "The Moment"
4. "Mind Mischief"
5. "Nangs"
6. "Elephant"
7. "Love/Paranoia"
8. "The Less I Know the Better"
9. "Yes I'm Changing"
10. "Why Won't You Make Up Your Mind?"
11. "Eventually"
12. "Borderline"
13. "Apocalypse Dreams"
14. "Feels Like We Only Go Backwards"
15. "New Person, Same Old Mistakes"
Janelle Monáe
1. "Crazy, Classic, Life"
2. "Screwed"
3. "Django Jane"
4. "Q.U.E.E.N."
5. "Electric Lady"
6. "Pynk"
7. "Yoga"
8. "I Like That"
9. "PrimeTime"
10. "Make Me Feel"
11. "I Got the Juice"
12. "Tightrope"
13. "Come Alive (The War of the Roses)"
Kurt Vile and The Violators
1. "Loading Zones"
2. "Jesus Fever"
3. "Bassackwards"
4. "Check Baby"
5. "Girl Called Alex"
6. "Wakin on a Pretty Day"
7. "Pretty Pimpin"
8. "Wild Imagination"
J Balvin
1. "Reggaetón"
2. "Machika"
3. "Con Altura"
4. "X"
5. "Ambiente"
6. "Ginza"
7. "Ahora"
8. "Ahora Dice"
9. "No Es Justo"
10. "Otra Vez"
11. "Downtown"
12. "Si Tu Novio Te Deja Sola"
13. "Sensualidad"
14. "Mi Cama"
15. "Quiero Repetir"
16. "Bum Bum Tam Tam"
17. "I Like It"
18. "Safari"
19. "Ay Vamos"
20. "6 AM"
21. "Contra La Pared"
22. "Mi Gente"
Rosalía
1. "Pienso en tu mirá"
2. "Como ali"
3. "Barefoot in the Park"
4. "De madrugá"
5. "Catalina"
6. "Que no salga la luna"
7. "Maldición"
8. "Te estoy amando locamente"
9. "A ningún hombre"
10. "De aquí no sales"
11. "Di mi nombre"
12. "Bagdad"
13. "Brillo"
14. "Lo presiento"
15. "Con Altura"
16. "Aute Cuture"
17. "Malamente"
Nathy Peluso
1. "Estoy triste"
2. "Hot Butter"
3. "Sandía"
4. "La passione"
5. "Bang Bang (My Baby Shot Me Down)"
6. "Alabame"
7. "La sandunguera"
8. "Gimme Some Pizza"
9. "Natikillah"
10. "Esmeralda"
11. "Corashe"

=== Primavera ===
Wednesday, 29 May	Thursday, 30 May	Friday, 1 June	Saturday, 2 June
Big Red Machine; Cuco; Hatchie; Melenas; Mow	Charli XCX; Guided by Voices; Christine and the Queens; Stephen Malkmus and the Jicks; Alice Phoebe Lou	Jungle; Low; Jawbreaker; Beak>; Snail Mail	Róisín Murphy; Primal Scream; Pusha T; Built to Spill; Ama Lou

=== Ray-Ban ===
Thursday, 30 May	Friday, 1 June	Saturday, 2 June
Nina Kraviz; FKA twigs; Dirty Projectors; Nas; Danny Brown; Soccer Mommy; Las Odio	Peggy Gou; Mura Masa; Kae Tempest; Suede; Derby Motoreta's Burrito Kachimba; Sons of Kemet XL; Lucy Dacus	DJ Rosario & Sama Yax; Modeselektor; Stereolab; Jarvis Cocker; Shellac; Daymé Arocena; Alondra Bentley

=== Pitchfork ===
Thursday, 30 May	Friday, 1 June	Saturday, 2 June
Mykki Blanco; Empress Of; 070 Shake; Sigrid; Clairo; Tomberlin; Odina	Iglooghost; Flohio; Yves Tumor Full Band; Aldous Harding; Liz Phair; Georgia Anne Muldrow; Putochinomaricón	Slowthai; Danny L Harle; Cupcakke; Neneh Cherry; Loyle Carner; Nilüfer Yanya; Retirada!

=== Adidas Originals ===
Thursday, 30 May	Friday, 1 June	Saturday, 2 June
Nitzer Ebb; Myrkur; Carcass; Stiff Little Fingers; Shonen Knife; Dream Wife; Elena Setién	Lisabö; Amyl and the Sniffers; Chai; Fucked Up; Pond; Lidia Damunt	JPEGMafia; The Messthetics; June of 44; Drab Majesty; Frank Carter and the Rattlesnakes; Haru Nemuri; Cariño

=== Auditori Rockdelux ===
Thursday, 30 May	Friday, 1 June	Saturday, 2 June
Apparat; Terry Riley & Gyan Riley; The Necks; Julien Baker; Bridget St John	Dirty Projectors; Julia Holter; María José Llergo; Midori Takada	Tim Hecker & Konoyo Ensemble; Le Mystère des Voix Bulgares; Tirzah; Caterina Barbieri

=== Night Pro ===
Wednesday, 29 May	Thursday, 30 May	Friday, 1 June	Saturday, 2 June
Meuko! Meuko!; L8Ching; Egosex; ?	P Postman; We Will Fail; Lonker See; Malihini; Belau; Teskno	5K HD; Bronko Yotte; Edsun; NFX; Birthh; Mayberian Sanskülotts; Hån	F5; Sistemas Inestables; Eli Almic & DJ RC; Phoro; DTSQ; Kirara; Bonish

=== Your Heineken Stage ===
Thursday, 30 May	Friday, 1 June	Saturday, 2 June
Severed Heads; The Comet Is Coming; Pylon Reenactment Society; Viva Belgrado; Chandra; Aliment	Kokoshca; Swervedriver; Él Mató a un Policía Motorizado featuring Amaia, J and Manu Ferrón; 107 Faunos; Piroshka; Birkins featuring Ken Stringfellow	Mujeres; Bush Tetras; The Bevis Frond; Me and the Bees; Evripidis and His Tragedies

=== Ray-Ban Studios ===
Thursday, 30 May	Friday, 1 June	Saturday, 2 June
Brat Star; Anastasia Kristensen; Djrum; Demdike Stare; Objekt; Upsammy	Batu; Roza Terenzi; Mad Miran; Object Blue; Overmono; Anthony Naples	Martyn; Peach; Aïsha Devi; Forest Drive West; DJ Marcelle; Suzanne Ciani

=== Seat Village Stage ===
Thursday, 30 May	Friday, 1 June	Saturday, 2 June
Jarvis Cocker; IDK; Celeste; Chynna Rogers; Erik Urano	AJ Tracey; Junglepussy; Mucho Muchacho; La Tiguerita	Richard Colburn; Little Simz; BbyMutha; Kaydy Cain; Quay Dash; Ninhomalo

== Primavera a la Ciutat line up ==
=== Sala Apolo ===
Monday, 27 May	Tuesday, 28 May	Wednesday, 29 May	Sunday, 2 June
Deerhunter; Kelly Kapøwski	Homeshake; Cate Le Bon	Apparat; Fucked Up; Coucou Chloe	DJ Coco; Cupcakke; Amyl & the Sniffers; The Beths; Agost

=== La (2) de Apolo ===
Tuesday, 28 May	Wednesday, 29 May	Sunday, 2 June
Meuko! Meuko!; L8Ching; We Will Fail; Lonker See; Teskno	Mina; Linn da Quebrada; Clara!; Bea Pelea; Lolina	Flaca; Miya Folick; Efrim Manuel Menuck; LNDFK

=== Day Pro ===
Wednesday, 29 May	Thursday, 30 May	Friday, 31 May	Saturday, 1 June	Sunday, 2 June
Museless; Retirada!; Agost; Malihini; IMB Festival Winner; Conttra; Lorena Álvarez	Thumper; Kojaque; Wyvern Lingo; A. Smyth; Laoise Kelly; Birthh; 5K HD; Mayberian Sanskülotts	Edsun; F5; Bonish; Eli Almic & DJ RC; Phoro; Belau; Sistemas Inestables; NFX; Bronko Yotte	L8Ching; Hån; Mr. Perfumme; P Postman	Tin Robots; Kirara; DTSQ

=== Living Primavera by Ikea ===
Thursday, 30 May	Friday, 31 May	Saturday, 1 June
Cuco	Hatchie	Tirzah

=== Barcelona ===
Sunday, 2 June
- Cupido
- Christina Rosenvinge
- Filthy Friends
- Lil Moss
- Aleesha
- Minimúsica

== Primavera Bits lineup ==
=== Lotus ===
Thursday, 30 May	Friday, 31 May	Saturday, 1 June
Maribou State; Yaeji; Sophie; Princess Nokia; Marie Davidson; Bakar; r.e.a.l.	Agoria; Objekt; Cybotron; Ivy Queen; Tony Touch & Friends; Sticky M.A.; Wednesday Campanella; Bflecha	Avalon Emerson; Richie Hawtin; David August; Tierra Whack; Lizzo; Channel Tres; Rrucculla; Museless

=== Desperados Cube ===
Thursday, 30 May	Friday, 31 May	Saturday, 1 June
Octo Octa B2B Eris Drew; Job Jobse; Denis Sulta; Jayda G; Krystal Klear; Dâm-Funk; Mafalda	Helena Hauff; Joy Orbison; Overmono; Dr. Rubinstein; Courtesy; Steffi; Laurel Halo; YLIA	Voiski; Jasss; Veronica Vasicka; Mozhgan; Hieroglyphic Being; Fantastic Man vs Tornado Wallace; Izabel; Epsilove; Nosedrip

=== Xiringuito Aperol ===
Thursday, 30 May	Friday, 31 May	Saturday, 1 June
Shakti Alliance (Ivy Barkakati + Modet + VIR); IM	Phosky; XOLS; Isabel	DJ Supermarkt; Ecran Total; Frinda di Lanco

=== El Punto by adidas Originals ===
Thursday, 30 May	Friday, 31 May	Saturday, 1 June
Uzielito Mix; Japanese; Rico Nasty; Gangsta Boo; Brat Star; GOA	Rosa Pistola; La Goony Chonga; GothBoiClique; Mark Luva; La Zowi; Somadamantina	Yung Beef; DJ Playero; Kodie Shane; Hurricane G featuring Tony Touch; Ian Isiah; Albany
