= Bizcochito (song) =

2022 song by Rosalía

- Remix artwork

Song by Rosalía

from the album Motomami
- Released: 18 March 2022
- Recorded: 2020
- Studio: Motomami House (Miami); Dejavú Apartment (Los Angeles)
- Genre: Chiptune
- Length: 1:49
- Label: Columbia
- Songwriters: Rosalia Vila Tobella; David Rodríguez; Michael Uzowuru
- Producers: Rosalía; Uzowuru; Rodríguez

Audio
- "Bizcochito" on YouTube

"Bizcochito" is a song recorded by Spanish singer and songwriter Rosalía. It is the seventh track on her third studio album, Motomami, which was released on 18 March 2022 through Columbia Records. The song was written and produced by Rosalía and Michael Uzowuru, with David Rodríguez serving as a miscellaneous producer. "Bizcochito" is an upbeat chiptune track featuring avant-garde elements driven by a dembow base, filtered instrumentation and light vocals. The song title references the 2004 track "Saoco" by Wisin and Daddy Yankee, marking the second time Rosalía references it, the first being in her single "Saoko," released earlier that year.

Upon Motomami's release, "Bizcochito" was met with acclaim from music critics, with compliments directed towards its early video game-like Super Mario-inspired beat and change of pace inside the album. Nevertheless, it met mixed popular acclaim, often being memeified on social media. Despite not being promoted as a radio single, "Bizcochito" became popular on TikTok later in the summertime after viral trends surged off the Motomami World Tour, peaking at number thirteen on the PROMUSICAE chart in Spain while also entering the charts in Portugal and the Billboard Global Excl. U.S.

== Background ==
In November 2018, Rosalía released her second studio album El mal querer, which she wrote and co-produced with el Guincho, her long-time collaborator. The album reimagines the folk and flamenco sound of Rosalía's previous album, Los Ángeles (2017), by mixing it with radio-friendly pop and urban crossover elements in an experimental key. Rosalía would expand her horizons and venture into reggaeton the following year, reaching mainstream audiences worldwide with songs like "Con altura" or "Yo x ti, tu x mi."

On El Mal Querer's follow-up, Motomami, Rosalía aimed to experiment beyond the new flamenco sound of her earlier albums. Initially planning to confect four different projects, Rosalía committed to a color palette at the sound level, which resulted in Motomami. "Bizcochito" is one of the many songs Rosalía wrote during the COVID-19 lockdown in Miami, before starting a nine-month mixing and mastering process in Los Angeles. Rosalía ended up co-producing the song as well as any other track on the album. "Bizcochito" was recorded by engineer and songwriter David Rodríguez and mixed by Manny Marroquín at Larrabee, Hollywood. Chris Gehringer mastered the track in New Jersey.

On 4 March 2022, two weeks before the release of Motomami, the soundtrack of Gran Turismo 7 titled Find Your Line, featuring "Bizcochito," was released through Sony Interactive. In July, the song was added to Fortnite.

== Composition ==
Look, "Bizcochito" comes from, you know that song that says, "Who are you?" She says, "Tu bizcochito," a reggaeton classic. Well, I thought, if they had asked me, well, I would have answered differently. So, that's why I wrote, "I am no longer, and I will never be your bizcochito."

— Rosalía talking about "Bizcochito"

"Bizcochito" is a chiptune song with dembow, champeta and avant-garde elements that runs for one minute and forty-nine seconds. It is the third shortest song on Motomami and the seventh shortest in her discography. Described by Rolling Stone as a track "so playful it sounds like an ice cream truck rolling through the neighborhood," during the song Rosalía alludes to the criticism she has received during her career in a sarcastic writing tone and a "childish", burlesque vocal tonality, mocking and infantilizing the criticism she receives in a funny tone. Lyrical references include Mala Rodríguez and Haraca Kiko. In 2023, album producer Noah Goldstein told Rolling Stone that the label was not sure about "Bizcochito" but Rosalía "was very adamant about keeping it on the album".

The title references the 2004 song "Saoco" by Wisin and Daddy Yankee, which she also referenced in her 2022 single "Saoko". "Bizcochito" also interpolates "Dangerous", performed by Busta Rhymes, and samples the last part of an unreleased freestyle rap track produced by el Guincho, which she had sung during the encore shows of the El Mal Querer Tour. Additional melodic inspirations include Mr. Vegas, Plan B, Tokischa, Las Guanabanas, Master Joe, Ivy Queen, el General, Popcaan, Héctor el Father, Rochy RD, and the theme song of Super Mario Bros.

== Remix ==
"Bizcochito" has been remixed multiple times by novel disc-jockeys, including Parkineos and Matias Deago, offering a new vision of the song. An official remix, produced by Leo RD, of the song was released exclusively on Amazon Music on 20 October 2022. It features guest vocals by Dominican rapper Haraca Kiko, who Rosalía references on the original cut.

== Credits and personnel ==
Credits were adapted from Motomami's liner notes.

- Mixed by Manny Marroquín at Larrabee Studio, West Hollywood, California.
- Mastered by Chris Gehringer at Sterling Sound, Edgewater, New Jersey.

Production personnel

- Rosalía Vila – production, lyrics, composition; vocals, beat, vocal arrangement.
- Michael Uzowuru – production, composition, beat.
- David Rodríguez – production, composition, additional production.
- Raúl Alejandro – additional production.
- Nicole Esteller – background vocals.
- Carolina Hernández – background vocals.

Technical personnel

- Manny Marroquin – mixing
- Zach Peraya – assistant mix engineer
- Jeremie Inhaber – assistant mix engineer
- Anthony Vilchis – assistant mix engineer
- Chris Gehringer – mastering

== Charts ==
Chart performance for "Bizcochito"
Chart (2022)	Peak position
Global Excl. US (Billboard)	187
Portugal (AFP)	163
Spain (Promusicae)	13

== Certifications ==
Certifications for "Bizcochito"
Region	Certification	Certified units/sales
Brazil (Pro-Música Brasil)	Platinum	40,000^{‡}
Mexico (AMPROFON)	Platinum+Gold	210,000^{‡}
Spain (Promusicae)	2× Platinum	120,000^{‡}
^{‡} Sales+streaming figures based on certification alone.

== Release history ==
Release history and formats for "Bizcochito"
Country	Date	Version	Format	Label	Ref
Various	18 March 2022	Solo	Digital download; streaming	Columbia	
Various	20 October 2022	Remix	Digital download; streaming	Columbia	
