= Brillo (disambiguation) =

Brillo may refer to:

- Brillo Pad, an American brand
- "Brillo" (song), by J Balvin and Rosalía
- "Brillo", a 1970 short story by Harlan Ellison and Ben Bova, subject of a lawsuit against the TV series Future Cop
- Android Things, an operating system previously known as Project Brillo
- Andrew Neil (b. 1949), Scottish journalist and broadcaster nicknamed Brillo
