= Como Alí =

2020 song by Spanish singer and songwriter Rosalía

Promotional single by Rosalía
- Language: Spanish
- English title: "Like Alí"
- Recorded: September 2018
- Studio: Conway Recording Studios, Los Angeles
- Genre: Pop
- Length: 2:18
- Label: Sony Music
- Songwriter(s): James Blake; Pablo Díaz-Reixa; Adam King Feeney; Brittany Talia Hazzard; Rosalia Vila
- Producer(s): El Guincho; Frank Dukes; Rosalia Vila

"Como Alí" is an unreleased song by Spanish singer and songwriter Rosalía. Written by the performer alongside English singer-songwriter James Blake, Brittany Hazzard and habitual collaborators Frank Dukes and El Guincho. The track was scheduled be released as a promotional single for the singer's MAC Cosmetics benefic campaign on September 24, 2020, though Sony Music, but never premiered on streaming platforms nor was available for digital download. The track references the 1968 Esquire Magazine cover where Muhammad Ali is portrayed, as the martyr Saint Sebastian.

== Background ==
In March 2019, Rosalía started her first world tour in Argentina. Its setlist included four unreleased tracks, one of them being "Como Alí". The track was sung at almost all stops of El Mal Querer Tour and became a fan favorite. During the COVID-19 lockdown in the United States, the track was revamped to serve as the main song for her future cosmetic campaign. On August 24, 2020, "Como Alí" was registered on ASCAP. Five days later, MAC Cosmetics announced on social media that a new face for Viva Glam would be revealed soon. Rosalía was announced as the brand's new face on August 31. A new red lipstick by MAC was revealed to be released in North American stores on September 24. The brand had this to say about the Spanish singer and its new product: "taking its roots in flamenco, Rosalía's art mixes genres and emotions: she takes risks, she is full of generosity, she is pure brilliance. She's a dynamic feminist who inspires self-expression and represents creativity and individuality. Thus, this lipstick contains charisma, energy and strength". All proceeds will be destinated to organizations that "will help support women and girls, people affected by HIV/AIDS and the LGBTQ+ community".

That same day the singer told Elle Canada that, by the time the spot aired on TV and the benefic lipstick was released, she would be dropping a new song titled "Como Alí".

== Music video ==
A music video for "Como Alí" directed by Canadian filmmaker Gordon Von Steiner was shot in Garraf in early January 2020. This will serve as another promotional item to incentive the product's sales as well as to promote the song and the singer's career. It features Rosalía dressed in red in a desert landscape accompanied by almost twenty dancers.
