= A Palé =

2019 single by Rosalía

Single by Rosalía
- Language: Spanish
- Released: 7 November 2019
- Genre: Glitch pop; experimental pop; avant-hip hop
- Length: 2:23
- Label: Columbia
- Songwriters: Rosalía Vila; Pablo Díaz-Reixa; Adam Feeney
- Producers: El Guincho; Frank Dukes; Rosalía; Noah Goldstein (add.)

Rosalía singles chronology
"Yo x Ti, Tu x Mi" (2019)	"A Palé" (2019)	"Highest in the Room" (remix) (2020)

Music video
- "A Palé" on YouTube

"A Palé" is a song by Spanish singer Rosalía. It was released by Columbia Records on 7 November 2019.

== Background ==
Rosalía posted a preview of the video on 6 November 2019 on her social media with the caption "A Palé mañanaaaaaa". A press release explained the song title, saying that it "takes its name from the nearly ubiquitous wooden shipping pallets Rosalía was surrounded by for years growing up in an area outside Barcelona dominated by trucking industry but the spirit of the song centers around 'doing it big' – our ability to be strong and carry a lot of weight". Song and video are a reference to the area Rosalía grew up in.

== Critical reception ==
Suzette Fernandez of Billboard pointed out the difference in sound compared to Rosalía's previous releases, saying that she "fusions her flamenco with contemporary global rhythms, stepping aside from the reggaeton beat from some of her other recent releases". Tom Breihan of Stereogum saw the song as Rosalía's return to getting "weird again" and described the singer's appearance as "snarling hard over a head-spinning, rippling beat". Jordan Darville of The Fader concluded that "the song itself chops samples, handclaps, and fat kick drums that easily puts it in banger territory".

== Promotion ==
As of live performances, Rosalía performed the song live for the first time at the Latin Grammy 2019, where she also performed "Con Altura". The song was added to the El Mal Querer Tour set list and was performed beginning with the 3 December 2019 show in Paris. "A Palé" served as the trailer track for the 2020 Netflix series "Warrior Nun". The track was also included in the TV commercial for the Nike "Air Max 2090". A remix by Gesaffelstein was released in January 2020 and another one by Overmono in April.

== Music video ==
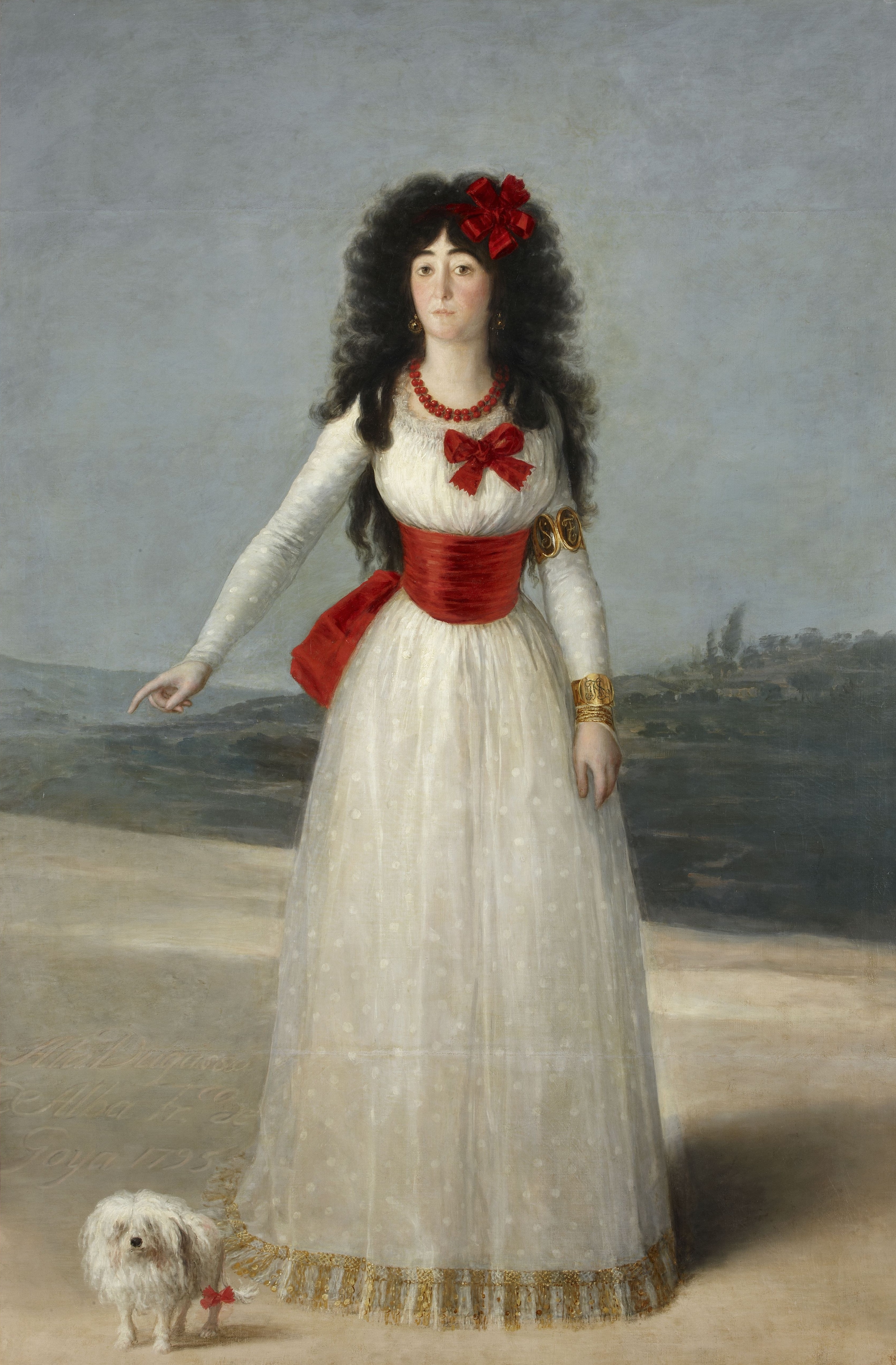
Rosalía takes The White Duchess's red bow and combines it with urban clothing.

The music video was released on 7 November 2019 and was directed by Jora Frantzis. The video takes place in an industrial park with the singer sitting in a dark shipping container. She is then seen jumping over several containers before sliding down a conveyor. Rosalía is seen wearing a unibrow in the video which critics compared to Mexican painter Frida Kahlo. It was filmed in Los Angeles in September 2019. It received several comparisons to American singer Billie Eilish, with whom she collaborated in late 2018. Rosalía and younger sister, Pilar Vila, were the creative directors of the song's music video which was named the darkest but yet one of the best of the artist's repertoire.

The music video was nominated for Best Editing at the 2020 MTV Video Music Awards.

== Meaning ==
The music video starts with Rosalía at an industrial park surrounded by containers while singing "since I was born, I knew I had a star in me, which I owe to nobody and that only protects me". ("Palé" means hidden in caló and pallet in Castilian Spanish, referring to the objects used to transport transformed products out of a factory to the market.)

After this scene, Rosalía sits voluntarily on an assembly line where she is touched and transformed by people in white clothing and transported in a "palé" made of glass. After this, the singer jumps on these previously named containers. In the beginning of the music video, Rosalía is seen with a unibrow, referencing Frida Kahlo. Kahlo was a Mexican communist painter whose tragic history and image have sadly been romanticized and commercialized around the world ignoring her art, thoughts or feelings. Therefore, the singer tries to express how a radical, broken and innovative woman has been capitalized and transformed into a commercial product. Rosalía also references Goya's "La Duquesa de Alba", the woman with most royal titles in Spain.

At this point its also notable the moves that the camera does, copying Rosalía's movements, referencing that she is constantly in the public eye, even though she sometime doesn't want to. Now knowing that "palé" means hidden in caló, this could mean that the singer is referencing her haters and how she's the centre of their thoughts. Rosalía sings how her style has been copied all around the world since it has been exported. She sings: "my Kawasaki rides in seguiriya". Seguirilla is one of the oldest genres in flamenco music. This references the pop/hip-hop fusion the Catalan artist has created within this classic Spanish art.

There is a key phrase in "A Palé". Rosalía sings in the pre-chorus: "bite if you have to". Here Rosalía talks about the necessity to answer to those people who dislike you in the same way they attack you. The final phrase of the song translates to "pull it back". Here she directly talks to her critics by showing that she is not a fabricated product by the music industry.

== Personnel ==
Credits adapted from Tidal.

- Rosalía Vila – vocals, songwriting, production
- Pablo Díaz-Reixa – songwriting, production, bass, drum, percussion, programming, recording engineering
- Frank Dukes – production, percussion, programming
- James Blake – background vocals
- DJ Riggins – assistant engineering
- Jacob Richards – assistant engineering
- Mike Seaberg – assistant engineering
- Chris Athens – master engineering
- Jaycen Joshua – mixing engineering

== Charts ==
Chart (2019–2020)	Peak position
Spain (PROMUSICAE)	16
US Dance Club Songs (Billboard) Gesaffelstein remix	30
US Hot Latin Songs (Billboard)	42
