= A ningún hombre =

2018 song by Rosalía

"A Ningún Hombre"

Song by Rosalía

from the album El mal querer
- Written: December 2016
- Released: November 2, 2018
- Genre: Minimal
- Length: 1:35
- Label: Columbia
- Songwriters: Rosalia Vila; Pablo Díaz-Reixa; Antón Álvarez
- Producers: El Guincho; Rosalía

Audio video
- "A Ningún Hombre" on YouTube

"A Ningún Hombre" (officially "A NINGÚN HOMBRE – Cap.11: Poder"; Spanish for "to no man") is a song performed by Spanish singer and songwriter Rosalía. A fan favorite, the song is the final track off the singer's second studio album El mal querer, which was released on November 2, 2018 through Columbia Records. It was produced by El Guincho and co-produced by Rosalía herself. The track has been streamed over 20 million times since its release.

== Background and composition ==
In 2017, Rosalía graduated from flamenco studies at the Catalonia College of Music in Barcelona. She presented her bachelor's degree project El mal querer, written by herself alongside Pablo Díaz-Reixa and ex-boyfriend Antón Álvarez, at that time and earned her a graduation with honors. The project was presented to Columbia Records the next year and was revamped and commercialized in November 2018 worldwide. The project is presented as a musical representation of the 13th century Occitan novel Flamenca, whose author remains unknown. This romance is about a young girl who marries a man who locks her up in a tower after discovering she has a lover and, in major part, because of jealousy and also due to the woman's undeniable beauty, which he is afraid of sharing. After her lover finds her and kills her husband in "Maldición", Rosalía makes a statement about celebrating her independence, abuse of power and swearing that she will never forget how badly she has been treated. Being a little over a minute and a half, the song is the second shortest track in the album or the shortest track in it the interlude isn't counted.

== Critical and commercial reception ==
The final track of El mal querer was very well received by critics. The Guardian stated that "A Ningún Hombre" is "a pretty visceral experience where her voice is powerful and gutsily emotive". The track peaked at the 35th position of the PROMUSICAE chart without being a single or a promotional track and lasted on it for three consecutive weeks. Five other album tracks entered the chart. The song was the inspiration for many protestors who attended the International Women's Day March in 2019 and 2020 in many parts of Spain and Latin America.

== Live performances ==
"A Ningún Hombre" was performed during some shows in Spain and London in the summer of 2018 as well as during her El Mal Querer worldwide tour, which ran from March to December 2019. She also performed the track during the 2019 MTV Video Music Awards in Newark alongside "Yo x Ti, Tu x Mi" and "Aute Cuture".

== Credits ==
- Rosalia Vila – producer, composer and lyricist
- Pablo Díaz-Reixa – producer, composer and lyricist
- Antón Álvarez – lyricist
- Jacob Richards – assistant engineer
- Mike Seaberg – assistant engineer
- Rashawn Mclean – assistant engineer
- Chris Athens – mastering engineer
- Jaycen Joshua – mixing engineer

== Charts ==
Chart (2020)	Peak position
Spain (PROMUSICAE)	35
