= Milionària =

Single by Rosalía
- Language: Catalan
- B-side: "Dios Nos Libre del Dinero"
- Released: 3 July 2019
- Recorded: February 2019
- Genre: Catalan rumba
- Length: 2:18
- Label: Columbia
- Songwriters: Rosalía Vila; Pablo Díaz-Reixa
- Producers: El Guincho; Rosalía

Rosalía singles chronology
"Aute Cuture" (2019)	"Milionària" (2019)	"Yo x Ti, Tu x Mi" (2019)

Music video
- "Millonària" on YouTube

"Milionària" (English: "Millionaire") is a song by Spanish singer Rosalía. It was released on 3 July 2019 by Columbia Records as a song from her first extended play, Fucking Money Man (2019). "Milionària" is the first song that the singer has released in Catalan. The song was written by Rosalía and her habitual collaborator and friend El Guincho, who also produced the song. A music video, directed by Bàrbara Farré, accompanied its release the same day. It reached number one in Spain, becoming her fourth number-one song and third consecutive number-one following "Con altura" and "Aute Cuture".

== Background ==
Rosalía began writing the song in February 2019 at the Seville Airport right after the 2019 Goya Awards. She finished the song in the studio after she arrived in Barcelona. Rosalia first teased the release of the song by using two emojis on Twitter, before announcing the release of her two-track EP Fucking Money Man (on which the song is included) in the Spanish press twelve hours before its official release. The singer also posted the announcement on her social media profiles. "Milionària" was released at 6pm (Central European Time). The song talks about how she dreamed about being a millionaire when she was younger thanks to her music. "Dios Nos Libre del Dinero" contrasts the message of "Milionària" by talking about how money cannot buy everything.

== Critical reception ==
Almost all of the reviews "Milionària" received from the international press were positive and praising the singer for singing in her native language, Catalan, despite its relative low profile and recognition worldwide. A Rolling Stone review, titled "Rosalia swims in money and sings in Catalan," saw Suzy Exposito opine: "If we've learned anything from Rosalía this year, it's that she's not afraid to take chances. [...] Now [...] the international pop heroine briskly sings not in Spanish, but in Catalan — the language native to her home of Barcelona." Pitchfork named "Milionària" as a best new song and said that her two new tracks "return the Spanish singer to her brand sui generis of postmodern flamenco".

== Commercial performance ==
"Milionària" debuted in the fourth position of the Spanish Apple Music chart where a couple hours after climbed to the top position.

Spanish online music magazine Vinilo Negro reported that "Rosalía will debut in the next list of songs in Spain with only 30 hours of counting with "Milionària". The song premiered last Wednesday at 6:00 p.m., with which it only had those 6 hours on Wednesday, in addition to Thursday, but they will be enough to debut on the Spanish list, and will not do so in very low positions." The magazine also reported that "It would be the first time in the era of streaming that a song with no time debuts on the list. The second song "Dios Nos Libre del Dinero" could have options as well, although most likely it will not debut until the following week. Next week Milionària could become the singer's number one song in Spain.

The song debuted at 51 on the PROMUSICAE chart with only two days of tracking before ascending to number one.

== Music video ==
The music video for "Milionària" was released the same day as the song. The video is a doble-feature with the song's B-side "Dios Nos Libre del Dinero". It shows Rosalia participating in a TV show where she is about to become a millionaire. The singer said that the video, which was directed by Catalan artist Bàrbara Farré, was inspired by the "TV contests that she usually sees with her grandmother". Pitchfork named the music video for both tracks, the ninth best music video of 2019.

== Personnel ==
Credits adapted from Tidal.

- Rosalía Vila – songwriting, production, vocals
- Pablo Díaz-Reixa – songwriting, production, recording engineering
- Jaycen Joshua – mixing
- Chris Athens – master engineering
- Morning Estrada – recording engineer

== Charts ==
=== Weekly charts ===
Weekly chart performance for "Milionària"
Chart (2019)	Peak position
Spain (PROMUSICAE)	1

=== Year-end charts ===
Year-end chart performance for "Milionària"
Chart (2019)	Position
Spain (PROMUSICAE)	54

== Certifications ==
Certifications for "Milionària"
Region	Certification	Certified units/sales
Spain (Promusicae)	2× Platinum	80,000^{‡}
^{‡} Sales+streaming figures based on certification alone.

== Release history ==
Release history for "Milionària"
Country	Date	Format	Label
Various	3 July 2019	Digital download; streaming	Columbia
