= Dios nos libre del dinero =

2019 song by Rosalía

Song by Rosalía
- Language: Spanish
- English title: "God Save Us from the Money"
- A-side: "Milionària"
- Released: 3 July 2019
- Genre: R&B
- Length: 1:48
- Label: Columbia; Sony
- Songwriters: Pablo Díaz-Reixa; Rosalía Vila
- Producer: El Guincho · Rosalía

Music video
- "Fucking Money Man" on YouTube

"Dios nos libre del dinero" (stylized as "Dio$ No$ Libre del Dinero"; transl. "God Save Us from Money") is a song recorded by Spanish singer and songwriter Rosalía. It was released through Sony and Columbia Records alongside its A-track "Milionària". This two songs complete the two-side single "Fucking Money Man", released on 3 July 2019. The songs' release was supported by a 4:47-minute long music video directed by Bàrbara Farré which contains Rosalia singing along to both of the songs while participating in old television contests and then burning the money she has obtained out of it.

== Background ==
The song was a surprise-release with a very little previous announcement by Rosalía. The singer recurred to the traditional paper press to announce on El País' 3 July edition that she would be releasing a new project titled "Fucking Money Man" that same day. A couple hours before the official release some streaming and music download platforms leaked that the project would be a two-side single with money as the main theme. The first song "Milionària" would be sung in the Catalan language, which is the singer's natal and main language, and "Dios Nos Libre del Dinero" would be sung in Spanish. The song contrasts its A-side which talks about dreaming about being a millionaire since the message behind "Dios Nos Libre del Dinero" is that money cannot buy everything.

== Commercial performance ==
The song was released on July 3, 2019 and debuted at number 86 on the PROMUSICAE chart with only one day tracking. The next week the song reached its peak position by charting on the twenty fourth position on that same chart. The song lasted on it for four weeks

== Credits and personnel ==
Credits adapted from Tidal.

- Rosalía Vila – vocals, songwriting, composer, co-producer, miscellaneous production
- Pablo Díaz-Reixa – songwriting, composer, miscellaneous production, recording engineering
- Chris Athens – master engineering
- Matt Tavares – miscellaneous production
- Jaycen Joshua – mixing engineering

== Charts ==
Chart (2019)	Peak position
Spain (PROMUSICAE)	24
