= Las Grecas =

Spanish musical duo

- Origin: Madrid, Spain
- Genres: Flamenco, Rock
- Years active: 1974 - 1979
- Label: CBS Records
- Past members: Carmela Muñoz; Tina Muñoz; Saray

Las Grecas was a Spanish musical duo of Flamenco - rock formed in 1973 by two romani sisters, Carmela Muñoz Barrull (Valladolid, July 19, 1954), and Edelina Muñoz Barrull (Madrid, February 17, 1957 - Aranjuez, January 30, 1995), better known as Tina. They had a huge initial success with the theme "Te estoy amando locamente" (I love you madly) which sold 500,000 copies. Their career later declined when the Muñoz sisters decided to dissolute Las Grecas.

It took two attempts for Las Grecas to resurrect in the 1990s, on both occasions with original singer Carmela: once alongside Alicia Robledo Benavente, better known by the stage name Malicia, and then alongside the eldest daughter of her sister Tina, Saray. In both cases, the relaunch of Las Grecas created no impact.

Later, in 2007, and after copyrighting the name Las Grecas, Malicia decided to form a second duet alongside Sofia Lozano, who was later replaced by her former partner from the group Las Suecas, Nani.

== Origins and early years ==
Raised in a family connected with the music industry (their father was an amateur flamenco singer) the Muñoz sisters moved to Argentina in 1965, because of their father's job. They began singing at parties in the Spanish community. There, they came into contact with American music, from Jimi Hendrix's rock to George Benson's jazz, in addition to South American musicians such as the Argentinian Sandro or Brazilian Caetano Veloso. They returned to Spain in 1970, specifically to a tablao in Toledo, belonging to an uncle, and here Carmela became seriously interested in the musical art form.

Once they had moved permanently to Madrid, Carmela started seeking tablao performances to help with the family's finances, since their father had to return to Argentina. After being rejected in "Las Cuevas de Nemesio" and "Arco de Cuchilleros" tablaos, the locations to which she was not admitted because she was blonde and having a familiar gypsy face. She had better luck in Canasteros, arriving with dyed hair and accompanied by her sister Tina. El tablao Manolo Caracol hired them instantly.

They started becoming famous in the music industry and soon after were hired by the singer Lola Flores for her tablao Caripén. It is here that they would be heard by the producer José Luis de Carlos and composer Felipe Campuzano who were attracted by the vocal unison created by Carmela and Tina in their performances. Both signed the Muñoz sisters for CBS. They had to find a stage name for them and thus decided on Las Grecas. The reason was that people spoke of them as "girls who sing in Greek", referring to the way the Muñoz sisters performed the song "Sagapo."

== Recordings ==
Once at the Audiofilm studios in Madrid, José Luis de Carlos first attempted to pair with Carmela and Tina with instrumentalists in the flamenco and pop genres, and finally decided to accompany them with top-notch rock musicians, such as Johnny Galvao, Eddy Guerin or Pepe Nieto. The first sample, Te estoy amando locamente/Amma immi was recorded and an overwhelming success. It was number one on the charts for five consecutive weeks, and went on to sell 500,000 copies of the album. Given this success, the album Gipsy rock soon went on sale.

Shortly thereafter, Las Grecas' second album Mucho más (1975) was launched. It was similar to the previous in terms of song productivity, but did not produce the expected success. The singles taken from were not very successful either. With Tercer Album, Las Grecas tried to change course, choosing funk and soul musical styles for their recordings. The album was still not very successful. In 1977 what was to be the Muñoz sisters' last album, Casta Viva was published. By then, other artists such as Arena Caliente, Las Deblas, Morena y Clara or shortly after, Camarón, were also performing in a similar genre. This was exacerbated by the professionals who were having problems with their manager who had defrauded them of the money they were entitled to for their performances. After being fired, he attempted, using his influence, to ensure that Las Grecas would have no continuity on the music scene. Carmela and Tina thus decided to dissolve Las Grecas.

== After dissolution ==
In 1983 Tina was diagnosed with "paranoid schizophrenia complicated by her heroin and alcohol addiction" that in a moment of crisis caused her to stick a knife in her sister's shoulder. She went to the women's prison and attended several psychiatric clinics from which she escaped. Tina was often seen wandering aimlessly through the city center or on the streets of San Blas neighborhood where the sisters lived. In January 1995, suffering from a poor diet and AIDS which had contracted, she died at 37 in a reception center in Aranjuez. Tina had been married three times, and had five daughters. Her eldest, Saray, was born in the mid-1970s, and she had a pair of twins.

== Discography ==
'Original training Tina and Carmela Muñoz:'

- 1974: Gipsy Rock
- 1975: Mucho más
- 1976: Tercer Album
- 1977: Casta Viva

New training Sofia Lozano and Malice

- 2009:Si me dejaras amarte

New training Nani and Malice

- 2011: Autenticas
- 2012: Siglo XXI

== Notes ==
Te estoy amando locamente (in English: I'm loving you crazily) was released in 1973 as the lead single from the album "Gipsy Rock". Written and composed by Felipe Campuzano, the song mixed psychedelic rock elements and flamenco singing. The song also features caló language. The song topped the Spanish charts at the time of its release and has since become a very popular song in the Spanish culture. The song is the duo's signature song. It has been covered by many artists, the last one being Spanish singer Rosalía.

"Te Estoy Amando Locamente" and "Achilipu" from "Gipsy Rock" and "Qué Bonito Aquella Noche" were covered by various Turkish singers. "Te Estoy Amando Locamente" was covered by Yeliz at her 45 rpm in 1976 as "Kırık Kalp" ("Broken hearth" in Turkish). "Qué Bonito Aquella Noche" was covered by firstly Nilüfer at her 45 rpm in 1976 and by Yeşim Vatan at "Beni Arayabilir Misin" ("Can you call me ?" in Turkish), her 2005 album as "Ara Sıra Bazı Bazı" (Sometimes on occasions" in Turkish). "Achilipu" was covered as "Çilli" (Freckled) by Lale Belkıs, who was singer and actor, in 1974 rpm and as "Çilli Bom" by various Turkish singers.

== Bibliography ==
- Pardo, José Ramón (2005). Historia del pop español. Madrid: Rama Lama Music. ISBN 84-934307-0-6.
