= Yo x Ti, Tú x Mí =

Single by Rosalía and Ozuna
- Language: Spanish
- English title: "Me for You, You for Me"
- Released: 15 August 2019
- Genre: Reggaeton
- Length: 3:21
- Label: Columbia
- Songwriters: Rosalía Vila; Juan Carlos Ozuna; Pablo Díaz-Reixa; Adam Feeney
- Producers: El Guincho; Frank Dukes; Rosalía

Rosalía singles chronology
"Milionària" (2019)	"Yo x Ti, Tú x Mí" (2019)	"A Palé" (2019)

Ozuna singles chronology
"China" (2019)	"Yo x Ti, Tú x Mí" (2019)	"Adicto" (2019)

Music video
- "Yo x Ti, Tú x Mí" on YouTube

"Yo x Ti, Tú x Mí" (transl. "Me for You, You for Me") is a song by Spanish singer Rosalía and Puerto Rican singer Ozuna. Written by both performers alongside El Guincho and produced by the latter with the help of Frank Dukes, the track was released as a single on August 15, 2019, through Columbia Records. Continuing the journey and exploration of Rosalía to urban music that "Con Altura" started, it reached number one in the singer's home country, becoming her fifth number-one single and her fourth consecutive number-one. It later won two Latin Grammy Awards for Best Urban Song and Best Urban Fusion/Performance, the second consecutive time Rosalía won those categories and Ozuna's first Grammy. Rolling Stone named it one of the greatest Spanish-language songs of the 21st century in 2025.

== Background ==
The song was first teased by Rosalía on her social media on 13 August 2019. The snippet sees the singer wearing a headband and facetiming Ozuna. Rosalía previously expressed appreciation for Ozuna's music by posting an acoustic version of "Amor Genuino" in July 2019. The song is also featured on the official soundtrack of FIFA 20 and FIFA 23, which was released via Spotify, Apple, and Deezer on September 13.

== Critical reception ==
In a positive review, Suzy Exposito of Rolling Stone complimented the song for being a "featherweight reggaeton groove" while also pointing out the "flirty verses" between the singers. Suzette Fernandez at Billboard noted that the song fuses "reggaeton, flamenco and electronic sounds". Writing for MTV, Madeline Roth stated that the song is "a romantic, reggaeton offering with a deceptively simple chorus".

In 2025, Rolling Stone listed it among the 100 greatest Spanish-language songs of the 21st century, at number 55.

== Music video ==
A music video for "Yo x ti, tú x mí" was released through Rosalía's YouTube channel on 15 August 2019. It was directed by Cliqua (RJ Sanchez and Pasqual Gutierrez). It was recorded in a mansion in Miami in January 2019 which means the song had been recorded previously. The filming lasted four days. The video features shots of Rosalía and Ozuna getting close with each other and dancing in various luxury hotel rooms while going through multiple costume changes. Jem Aswad of Variety described the visuals as "a light-hearted romantic outing with the Puerto Rican rapper/singer" and drew comparisons to Ariana Grande.

== Personnel ==
Credits adapted from Tidal.

- Rosalía Vila – songwriting, production, vocals
- Pablo Díaz-Reixa – songwriting, production, recording engineering
- Juan Carlos Ozuna – songwriting
- Frank Dukes – production
- Jacob Richards – assistant engineering
- Mike Seaberg – assistant engineering
- Rashawn Mclean – assistant engineering
- Jaycen Joshua – mixing
- Chris Athens – master engineering
- Hi Flow – recording engineering
- Morning Estrada – recording engineering

== Charts ==
=== Weekly charts ===
Weekly chart performance for "Yo x ti, tú x mí"
Chart (2019–2020)	Peak position
Argentina (Argentina Hot 100)	12
Belgium (Ultratip Bubbling Under Flanders)	1
Belgium (Ultratip Bubbling Under Wallonia)	16
Chile (Monitor Latino)	9
Colombia (National-Report)	13
Dominican Republic (SODINPRO)	16
France (SNEP)	189
Greece (IFPI)	73
Italy (FIMI)	61
Lithuania (AGATA)	84
Mexico Streaming (AMPROFON)	7
Mexico (Billboard Mexican Airplay)	16
Panama (Monitor Latino)	9
Paraguay (SGP)	30
Portugal (AFP)	29
Puerto Rico (Monitor Latino)	3
Spain (PROMUSICAE)	1
Sweden Heatseeker (Sverigetopplistan)	15
Switzerland (Schweizer Hitparade)	29
US Bubbling Under Hot 100 (Billboard)	17
US Hot Latin Songs (Billboard)	12
US Latin Airplay (Billboard)	1
US Latin Rhythm Airplay (Billboard)	1
Venezuela (Monitor Latino)	4

=== Year-end charts ===
2019 year-end chart performance for "Yo x ti, tú x mí"
Chart (2019)	Position
Portugal (AFP)	186
Spain (PROMUSICAE)	12
US Hot Latin Songs (Billboard)	52

2020 year-end chart performance for "Yo x ti, tú x mí"
Chart (2020)	Position
Argentina Airplay (Monitor Latino)	69
Spain (PROMUSICAE)	78
US Hot Latin Songs (Billboard)	54

== Certifications ==
Certifications for "Yo x Ti, Tu x Mi"
Region	Certification	Certified units/sales
France (SNEP)	Platinum	200,000^{‡}
Italy (FIMI)	Platinum	100,000^{‡}
Mexico (AMPROFON)	Diamond+3× Platinum+Gold	510,000^{‡}
Portugal (AFP)	Gold	5,000^{‡}
Spain (Promusicae)	5× Platinum	300,000^{‡}
Switzerland (IFPI Switzerland)	Platinum	20,000^{‡}
United States (RIAA)	Platinum	1,000,000^{‡}
^{‡} Sales+streaming figures based on certification alone.

== Release history ==
Release history and formats for "Yo x ti, tú x mí"
Country	Date	Format	Label	Ref.
Various	15 August 2019	Digital download; streaming	Columbia	
Italy	11 October 2019	Contemporary hit radio	Columbia	

== See also ==
- List of Billboard Hot Latin Songs and Latin Airplay number ones of 2019
