= Brillo (song) =

2018 song by J Balvin and Rosalía

Song by J Balvin and Rosalía

from the album Vibras
- Released: May 25, 2018
- Recorded: November 2017
- Studio: MGB Music, Las Vegas
- Genre: Latin R&B
- Length: 2:39
- Label: Sony Music
- Songwriter(s): Alejandro Ramírez; Jesús Mª Nieves Cortés; Jose Álvaro Osorio Balvin; Marco Masis; Rosalia Vila
- Producer(s): Sky Rompiendo el Bajo; Tainy

"Brillo" is a song by Colombian reggaeton singer J Balvin in collaboration with Spanish new flamenco singer Rosalía. Released on May 25, 2018, through Sony Music Latin, It is the seventh track on Balvin's fifth studio album Vibras (2018). It is written by Alejandro Ramírez, Jesús María Nieves, Marco Masis and both performers.

== Critical reception ==
Rolling Stone named "Brillo" an "abstract flamenco duet" while The Guardian had to say that "it is an undeniably sensual track where the delicate and versatile vocals of Spanish flamenco singer Rosalía shine over a minimal background". Remezcla's Sara Skolnick stated "Brillo is a hypnotizing track anchored by Barcelona-based vocalist Rosalía, whose mission to“revolutionize flamenco” is articulated once again through intuitive hand claps and vocal takes that lend an airy precision in conversation with Balvin's". It was called a "potential summer hit" by Vogue Magazine.

== Commercial performance ==
After being posted on YouTube for 72 hours, the song was streamed over 170,000 times, becoming a moderate hit for Balvin. However, the track gained special recognition in Spain after Rosalía became massively successful in the country following the release of her track "Malamente" in May 2018, the lead single of her Latin Grammy Award-winning album El Mal Querer. The track had over 60 million streams in 2020; as of December 2022, Brillo has over 126 million streams on Spotify. The song became a top-20 hit in Spain and was certified platinum there for selling over 40,000 copies.

== Live performances ==
Balvin has sung the track live on his 2018 Vibras Tour and Rosalía on her El Mal Querer Tour in 2019. They have sung the track together at The Forum in Inglewood in September 2018 as well as during the Primavera Sound music festival in Barcelona in June 2019, which they both headlined.

== Personnel ==
Credits adapted from Tidal.

- Alejandro Ramirez (Sky Rompiendo el Bajo) - producer, composer and lyricist
- Marco Masis (Tainy) - producer, composer and lyricist
- Jesús Mª Nieves - composer and lyricist
- Jose Álvaro Osorio (J Balvin) - composer and lyricist
- Rosalia Vila Tobella - composer and lyricist

== Charts ==
Weekly chart performance for "Brillo"
Chart (2018)	Peak position
Spain (PROMUSICAE)	18

2018 year-end chart performance for "Brillo"
Chart (2018)	Position
Spain (PROMUSICAE)	68

== Certifications ==
Certifications and sales for "Brillo"
Region	Certification	Certified units/sales
Brazil (Pro-Música Brasil)	Gold	20,000^{‡}
Spain (PROMUSICAE)	2× Platinum	120,000^{‡}
^{‡} Sales+streaming figures based on certification alone.
