= Aute Cuture =

Song by Spanish singer and songwriter Rosalía

Single by Rosalía
- Language: Spanish
- English title: "High Fashion"
- Released: 30 May 2019
- Recorded: November 28, 2017
- Genre: Pop
- Length: 2:27
- Label: Columbia
- Songwriters: Rosalía Vila; Pablo Díaz-Reixa; Leticia Sala
- Producers: El Guincho; Rosalía

Rosalía singles chronology
"Barefoot in the Park" (2019)	"Aute Cuture" (2019)	"Milionària" (2019)

Music video
- "Aute Cuture" on YouTube

"Aute Cuture" is a song by Spanish singer Rosalía. It was released on 30 May 2019 by Columbia Records. The song debuted atop the Spanish charts, becoming her third number-one single and second consecutive number-one debut. It received a nomination for Record of the Year at the 20th Latin Grammy Awards.

== Background ==
Rosalia sang the song for the first time in June 2018 when she was part of the Sónar music festival held in Barcelona. On 28 May 2019, Rosalía announced the release of the song and posted a preview of the video on her social media. In a statement, Rosalía said that she began making the song's beats in November 2017 with close friend and producer el Guincho. She also stated that she wrote the song before she embarked on El Mal Querer Tour and that she would take enough time to release the best video to suit the song. The release of song and video marked the one year anniversary of the release of her single "Malamente".

== Critical reception ==
In a positive review, Matthew Ismael Ruiz of Pitchfork noted that the song "may be a tongue-in-cheek ode to high fashion that name-checks Valentino and the Hamptons, yet the intentional misspelling of haute couture betrays a mocking tone." Forbes' Jeff Benjamin called the song's name "a tongue-in-cheek take on 'haute couture', implying a mocking tone to hipster and high-brow fashion", and stated that "amid the cultural critiques, there's fun and easy sing-along moments throughout the track too".

== Music video ==
A music video for "Aute Cuture" was released through Rosalía's YouTube channel on 30 May 2019. It was directed by Bradley & Pablo while story writing was managed by Rosalía and Pili. It features Rosalía and a group of women as members of the "Mystic Beauty Gang". They are seen opening and running a salon that is "dedicated to baroque, sculptural manicures", according to Rolling Stone. Furthermore, the video is described as a "celebration of hard-edged femininity". Sydney Gore of Highsnobiety described the visuals as "a full-on cinematic experience".

== Personnel ==
Credits adapted from Tidal.

- Rosalía Vila – songwriting, production, vocals
- Pablo Díaz-Reixa – songwriting, production, recording engineering
- Leticia Sala – songwriting
- Jaycen Joshua – mixing
- Chris Athens – master engineering

== Charts ==
=== Weekly charts ===
Weekly chart performance for "Aute Cuture"
Chart (2019)	Peak position
Belgium (Ultratip Bubbling Under Flanders)	9
Spain (PROMUSICAE)	1
US Hot Latin Songs (Billboard)	39

=== Year-end charts ===
Year-end chart performance for "Aute Cuture"
Chart (2019)	Position
Spain (PROMUSICAE)	94

== Certifications ==
Certifications for "Aute Cuture"
Region	Certification	Certified units/sales
Spain (Promusicae)	Platinum	40,000^{‡}
^{‡} Sales+streaming figures based on certification alone.
