= Con Altura =

Single by Rosalía and J Balvin featuring El Guincho
- Language: Spanish
- Released: 28 March 2019
- Recorded: September 2018
- Genre: Reggaeton; Latin pop
- Length: 2:41
- Label: Columbia
- Songwriters: Rosalía Vila; José Osorio; Pablo Díaz-Reixa; Adam Feeney; Teo Halm; Alejandro Ramírez; Aury Pineda
- Producers: El Guincho; Frank Dukes; Halm; Sky Rompiendo; Rosalía

Rosalía singles chronology
"De Aquí No Sales" (2019)	"Con Altura" (2019)	"Barefoot in the Park" (2019)

J Balvin singles chronology
"I Can't Get Enough" (2019)	"Con Altura" (2019)	"La Rebelión" (2019)

Music video
- "Con Altura" on YouTube

"Con Altura" (lit. 'With altitude') is a song by Spanish singer Rosalía and Colombian singer J Balvin, featuring Spanish producer el Guincho. Written by Rosalía, Balvin, Aury "Mariachi Budda" Pineda, el Guincho, Frank Dukes, Teo Halm, and Sky Rompiendo, and produced by the last four alongside the Spanish singer, the song was released by Columbia Records on 28 March 2019.

"Con Altura" peaked at number one in six countries, many of them Latin American, and started the ascent of Rosalía into the international music scene. The song was one of the best-performing singles of 2019, streamed over 1.5 billion times during the year. It was listed in many year-end lists and received critical acclaim, with Billboard ranking it fifth on their list of 100 Best Songs of 2019 as Pitchfork the eighth best. "Con Altura" won the Latin Grammy Award for Best Urban Song and was also nominated for a Teen Choice and an MTV Europe Music Award, among others.

Its music video, directed by Director X, accompanied its release the same day. It reached social media virality and became the most-watched female music video on YouTube of 2019. It earned the performers multiple accolades. Rosalía made history after winning two MTV Video Music Awards for Best Latin and Best Choreography as she became the first ever Spanish-winning artist at the ceremony. "Con altura" also appeared on Just Dance 2020, Grand Theft Auto Online and Saints Row. The song originated Rosalía's nickname "La Rosalía".

== Background ==
In May 2018, Colombian singer J Balvin released his fifth studio album Vibras (2018). The album included a collaboration with Rosalía called "Brillo", which reached the 19th position on the Spanish singles chart. In September 2018, Rosalía stayed a couple days in Miami due to her performance at the Ziff Ballet Opera House to celebrate her five Latin Grammy nominations. The singer told at a press conference in Argentina that the song was born there. The song includes a talked sample of Dominican influencer Mariachi Budda, which Rosalía eventually found on the Internet spontaneously and had coined and registered the phrase "Con Altura".

At the end of 2018, Rosalía began to work on her third studio album, which was set to be released in mid-2021. By that time, she also began to announce the first dates of her debut world tour named El Mal Querer Tour. In December 2018, a snippet of the music video was posted by Balvin's team on their Instagram stories; the videos were deleted almost instantly. In March 2019, rumors began circulating about Rosalía performing new (un)released song(s) on her tour. Those rumors were confirmed by Rosalía herself when she finally announced the song's release on 27 March 2019 through a social media post. As well as Rosalía and J Balvin, the songwriters are Frank Dukes, Teo Halm, Alejandro Ramírez and el Guincho.

== Critical reception ==
After its release, the song was received well by critics. Pitchfork named Rosalía's new single "a lighthearted mix of boastful tropes meant to be playful. It's a high-flying trifle of a song whose video and title show both artists at the top of their game". Rolling Stone stated: "it's a modern take in reference to Spanish flamenco songs inspired by Afro-Caribbean sounds; ever the champion of cross-cultural experimentation, Rosalía has ultimately described it as her personal homage to classic reggaeton."

== Commercial performance ==
Within 24 hours on streaming platforms, the song received 201,000 Spotify streams in Spain, beating Aitana's "Teléfono" as the most-streamed female song in a single day in Spotify Spain. After a week, the song had been streamed over 15 million times of which 4.71M came from Spain. This set the record for the most streamed song in Spain in only a week. Its music video received over 22 million views in that time. The song debuted number one in Spain, being Rosalía's second number one there after "Di mi nombre". "Con altura" topped the Argentina Hot 100 chart in July 2019.

== Music video ==
Rosalía shared a preview of the music video on 27 March 2019. The video itself, directed by Director X. premiered on the singer's YouTube channel the day after. The video features Spanish dance formation, Las Ocho Rosas (who are Rosalía's backup dancers) and J Balvin inside a plane while dancing to the song and piloting the plane.

In the third week of June 2019, it became the most-viewed music video globally in a single week, with more than 19 million views in 7 days. A week later, the music video had been viewed more than 500 million times. Starting 9 July, it became the most-viewed music video by a female artist of 2019, a record previously held by Ariana Grande's "7 Rings". It reached one billion views by mid-October.

== Personnel ==
Credits adapted from Tidal, Jaxsta, and The New York Times.

Production

- El Guincho – production, songwriting; vocals
- Frank Dukes – production, songwriting
- Rosalía – production, songwriting; vocals
- Sky Rompiendo – production, songwriting
- J Balvin – songwriting; vocals
- Teo Halm – production, songwriting; background vocals
- Aury "Mariachi Budda" Pineda – songwriting

Technical

- Morning Estrada – recording engineer
- El Guincho – recording engineer
- Manny Marroquin – mixing
- Chris Galland – assistant engineer
- Jeremie Inhaber – assistant engineer
- Robin Florent – assistant engineer
- Emerson Mancini – mastering

== Charts ==
=== Weekly charts ===
Weekly chart performance for "Con altura"
Chart (2019)	Peak position
Argentina (Argentina Hot 100)	1
Belgium (Ultratip Bubbling Under Flanders)	17
Belgium (Ultratip Bubbling Under Wallonia)	11
Bolivia (Monitor Latino)	14
Chile (Monitor Latino)	2
Colombia (Monitor Latino)	2
Colombia (National-Report)	1
Costa Rica (Monitor Latino)	2
Dominican Republic (Monitor Latino)	1
Ecuador (National-Report)	31
El Salvador (Monitor Latino)	2
France Downloads (SNEP)	76
France (SNEP)	175
Guatemala (Monitor Latino)	13
Greece International Digital (IFPI Greece)	64
Honduras (Monitor Latino)	17
Mexico (Billboard Mexico Airplay)	1
Mexico Streaming (AMPROFON)	7
Nicaragua (Monitor Latino)	17
Panama (Monitor Latino)	7
Paraguay (Monitor Latino)	17
Peru (Monitor Latino)	4
Portugal (AFP)	55
Puerto Rico (Monitor Latino)	15
Romania (Airplay 100)	36
Spain (PROMUSICAE)	1
Switzerland (Schweizer Hitparade)	98
Uruguay (Monitor Latino)	5
US Bubbling Under Hot 100 (Billboard)	18
US Hot Latin Songs (Billboard)	12
US Latin Airplay (Billboard)	15
US Latin Rhythm Airplay (Billboard)	9
Venezuela (Monitor Latino)	6
Venezuela (National-Report)	1

=== Year-end charts ===
2019 year-end chart performance for "Con altura"
Chart (2019)	Position
Argentina (Monitor Latino)	14
Bolivia (Monitor Latino)	58
Chile (Monitor Latino)	60
Colombia (Monitor Latino)	6
Costa Rica (Monitor Latino)	25
Dominican Republic (Monitor Latino)	37
Ecuador (Monitor Latino)	7
El Salvador (Monitor Latino)	9
Guatemala (Monitor Latino)	41
Honduras (Monitor Latino)	41
Mexico (Monitor Latino)	60
Nicaragua (Monitor Latino)	64
Panama (Monitor Latino)	31
Paraguay (Monitor Latino)	30
Peru (Monitor Latino)	12
Portugal (AFP)	110
Puerto Rico (Monitor Latino)	27
Romania (Airplay 100)	76
Spain (PROMUSICAE)	6
Uruguay (Monitor Latino)	10
US Hot Latin Songs (Billboard)	21
Venezuela (Monitor Latino)	17

== Certifications ==
Region	Certification	Certified units/sales
Brazil (Pro-Música Brasil)	Diamond	160,000^{‡}
Canada (Music Canada)	Gold	40,000^{‡}
France (SNEP)	Platinum	200,000^{‡}
Italy (FIMI)	Gold	25,000^{‡}
Mexico (AMPROFON)	2× Diamond+3× Platinum	780,000^{‡}
Poland (ZPAV)	Gold	10,000^{‡}
Portugal (AFP)	Gold	5,000^{‡}
Spain (Promusicae)	5× Platinum	200,000^{‡}
Switzerland (IFPI Switzerland)	Gold	10,000^{‡}
United States (RIAA)	2× Platinum	2,000,000^{‡}
^{‡} Sales+streaming figures based on certification alone.

== Release history ==
Country	Date	Format	Label
Various	28 March 2019	Digital download; streaming	Columbia
Spain	31 March 2019	Contemporary hit radio	Columbia
Italy	21 June 2019	Contemporary hit radio	Columbia

== See also ==
- List of Billboard Argentina Hot 100 number-one singles of 2019
- List of number-one singles of 2019 (Spain)
- List of Billboard Mexico Airplay number ones
