= Espacio Solo =

Private contemporary art museum in Madrid

- Established: 1 September 2013
- Location: Retiro, Madrid
- Coordinates: 40.42076579378246°N 3.688300105072749°W
- Collections: Contemporary art
- Collection size: 948
- Founders: Ana Gervás & David Cantolla
- Architect: estudioHerreros (Juan Herreros+Jens Richter)
- Website: www.coleccionsolo.com

Espacio Solo – and its accompanying Colección Solo – is a private contemporary art museum in Madrid, founded by Spanish industrialist Ana Gervás and entertainment executive David Cantolla in 2013 and expanded into its current form in 2018. David Cantolla is the founder of Zinkia Entertainment and a BAFTA award winner for the animated series Pocoyo.

The collection comprises 1,200 paintings, sculptures and drawings by an international group of artists, including established and emerging artists working in figurative art, contemporary sculpture, pop surrealism and new media. The art collection forms the core of several museum programs that aim to support artists and art education across Madrid with different art support projects, awards and grants.

In 2025, the name of the project is changed to SOLO to include the collection, artist support projects and art spaces. In mid-2025, SOLO adds a new art space in Madrid, SOLO CSV, designed by architect Juan Herreros.

== Exhibitions ==
Colección Solo showcases in its museum Espacio Solo a diverse range of artworks through its rotating temporary exhibitions.

- 2018: Mu Pan and other Beasts – First museum retrospective of the Brooklyn-based artist. Mu Pan.
- 2020: Still Human – Works by over 40 artists including David Altmejd, Mario Klingemann, Tomoo Gokita, Neo Rauch, Nina Saunders, Nam June Paik, Evru/Zush, and Miriam Cahn.
- 2022: Certeza – Works by artists such as Amoako Boafo, Alex Hug, Filip Custic, Chino Moya, SMACK, Nick Cave, Koka Nikoladze, Andrea Galvani, Nik Ramage, Masako Miki, Henry Nobody Jr, Adam Parker Smith, and the AI collaborative artist Botto.
- 2023: Protection No Longer Assured – Various interpretations of the concept of the sublime and showcases works by artists such as Keiichi Tanaami, David Altmejd, Mika Rottenberg, Justin Matherly, Glenda León, Paco Pomet, and Grip Face, among others.
- 2024: Handle With Care - an exhibition group exploring the act of collecting. Featuring over 60 artists from various mediums, including artist as Gary Simmons, Jordy Kerwick, Vanessa Barragão, Rinus Van de Velde, filip custic, Miriam Cahn, Zhanna Kadyrova, Izumi Kato, Danny Fox, Mercedes Helnwein, Kotaro Abe, Chino Moya, among others.
- 2025: Barjola, an apocryphal portrait - an exhibition exploring the legacy of Juan Barjola (1919-2004) and his influence on contemporary art. Bringing together over 20 international artists from Colección SOLO, the show connects Barjola’s work with figures such as Stephan Balkenhol, David Altmejd, Tomoo Gokita, Eva Alonso, Tobias Bradford, Aaron Johnson, Martina Menegon, Lusesita, and Paco Pomet, alongside masters like Francis Bacon and David Lynch.
- 2026: Helnwein: mundos invertidos. An exhibition exploring the unsettling and provocative universe of Austrian artist Gottfried Helnwein (1948). The exhibition brings together over 40 works by Helnwein from a dozen European private collections, in dialogue with works by more than 30 international artists from SOLO. The show explores themes of identity, violence, vulnerability and the darker side of contemporary society. It reveals connections between Helnwein’s hyperrealist imagery and a wide range of contemporary artistic practices..

== International exhibitions ==
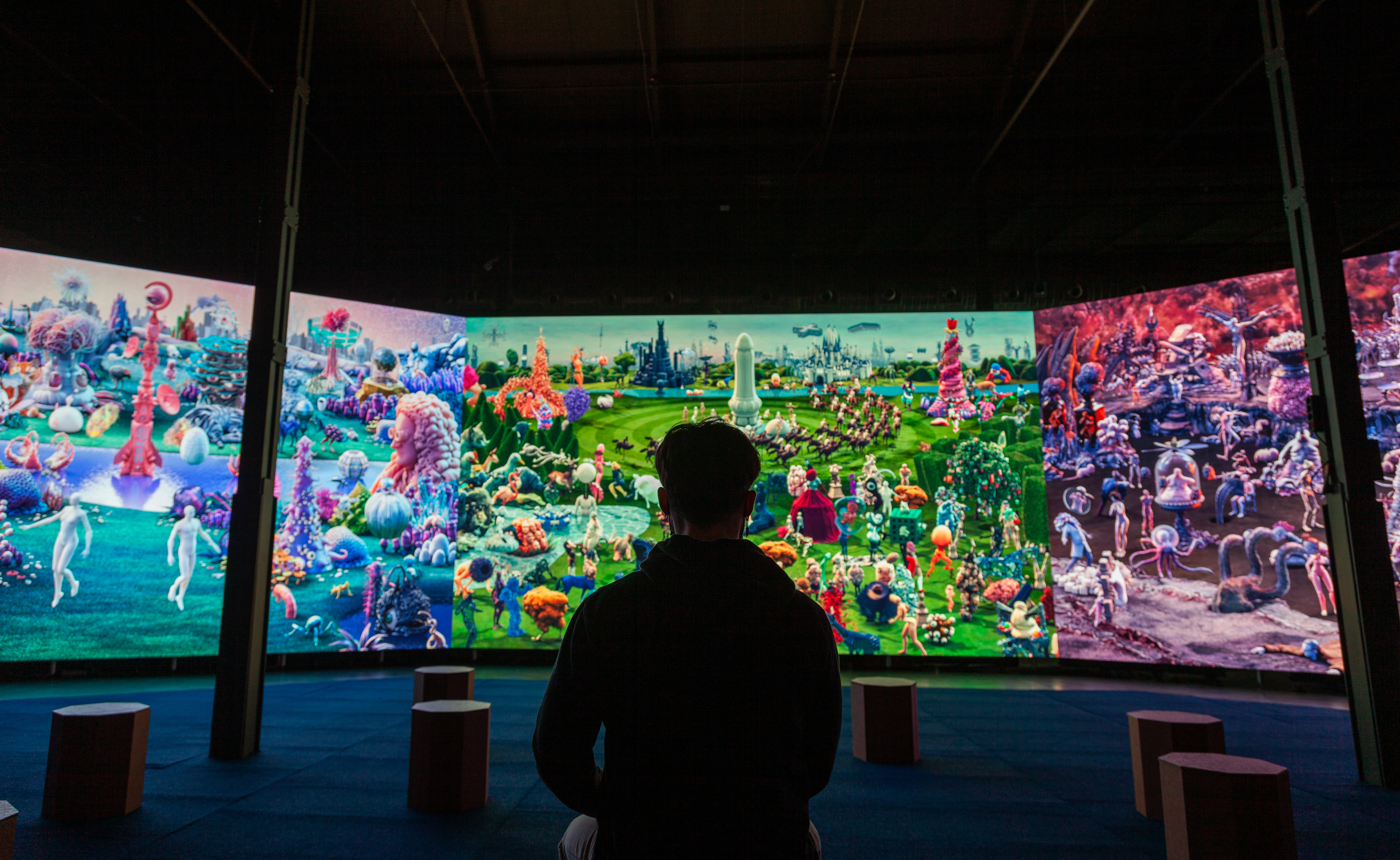
SPECULUM, a contemporary version of Bosch's masterpiece The Garden of Earthy Delights by SMACK. On view at Colección Solo's exhibition at Matadero Museum (Madrid)

In 2021, Colección Solo curated a special exhibition titled The Garden of Earthly Delights. Through the artworks of Colección Solo at the Matadero Madrid Centre for Contemporary Creation. The exhibition aimed to re-contextualize Bosch's masterpiece in the contemporary era and featured the works of 15 international artists across various mediums, including digital animation, artificial intelligence, sound, painting, and ceramics. The exhibition attracted over 90,000 visitors and included works by artists such as Cassie McQuater, Dan Hernandez, and the Dutch collective SMACK, who created a digital contemporary interpretation of Bosch's SPECULUM.

Loans from Colección Solo such Gari Baseman's Secrets and Truth has been part of the Summerhall at the Edinburgh Art Festival in 2014 and 2015, D*Face's work Peace is a Dirty Word was loaned for the artist's first retrospective at CAC Malaga. Mario Klingemann's artwork The Butcher's Son has been donated to the Victoria & Albert Museum in 2021, and Filip Custic's piece X=Y=Z was loaned to the Ohm Museum in 2022, among others.

In 2023 Colección Solo coproduced with Japanese PARCO Museum a filip custic's exhibition titled Human Product. The artist explores the relationship between body, mind, and technology, and how these three elements interact to shape our identity during a time when we are connected 24/7.

== Artistic Programs, Awards and Experimentation projects ==
Colección Solo operates ONKAOS, a program dedicated to nurturing new media artists. Artists such as Mario Klingemann, Filip Custic, the Dutch collective SMACK, artist Chino Moya, and sound artist Koka Nikoladze are part of this new media support programm.

One project born through ONKAOS program is Mario Klingemann's work. Memories of Passersby I became the first AI artwork auctioned by Sotheby's. Klingemann's other creations include "Appropriate Response," recognized at Ars Electronica 2020, and A.I.C.C.A., an art performative sculpture art critic dog in 2023.

Presented at Solo Space, A.I.C.C.A. is a performative sculpture—a dog-shaped robot generating critical essays on observed artworks autonomously. Challenging AI's traditional role, it blurs sculpture, technology, and performance, raising questions about art criticism's subjectivity. Inspired by vintage toys, A.I.C.C.A. employs a sophisticated algorithm to learn and make independent decisions based on patterns and training data.

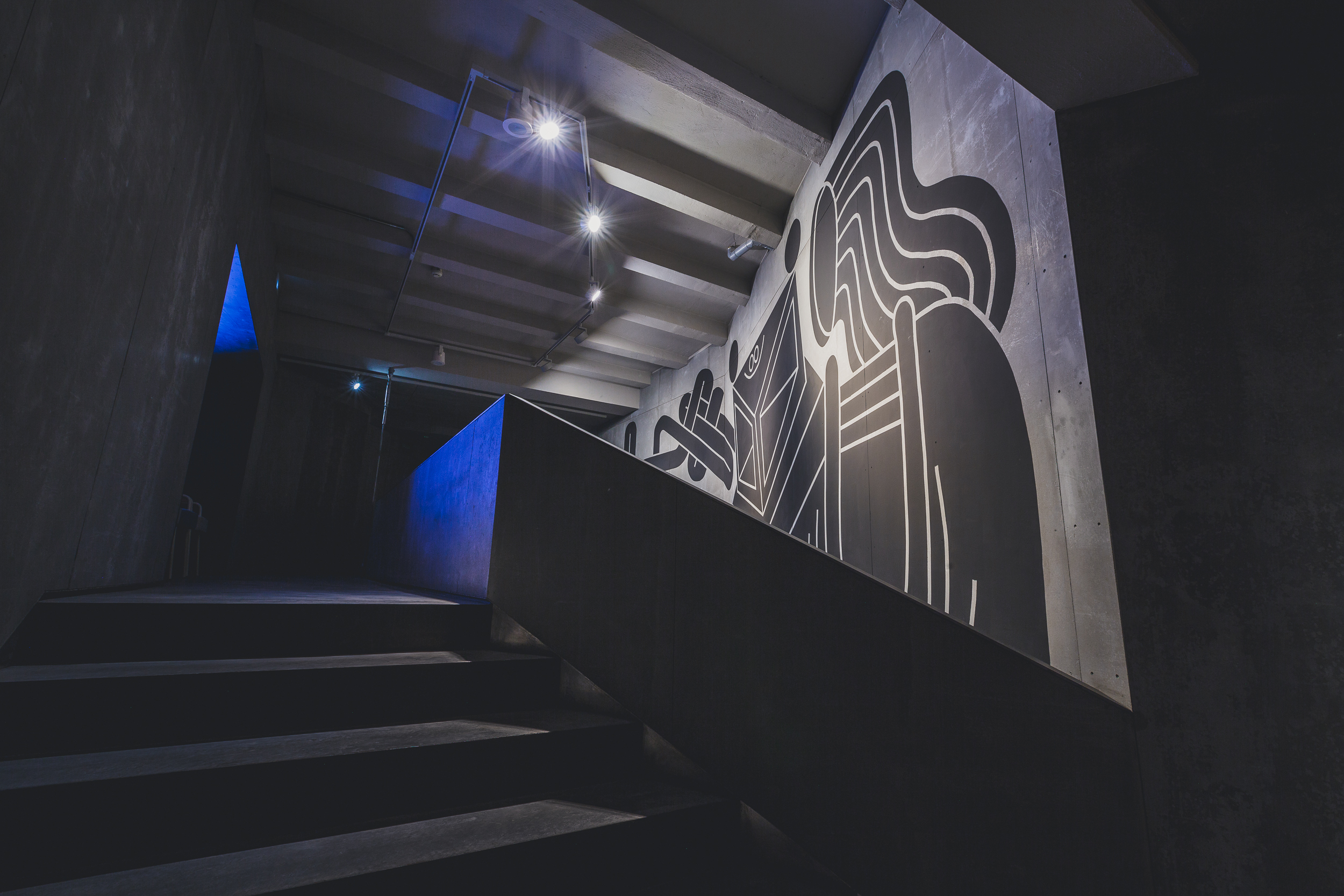
Batalla de Croya (2018), by Juan Díaz-Faes, at Colección SOLO museum (Madrid)

Colección Solo has supported various artists through artistic residencies and support programs. Artists such as Juan Díaz-Faes, known for creating murals in cities like Hamburg, Madrid, and Miami, as well as Ryan Heshka, Raymond Lemstra, and Spanish artist Bnomio, known for his Memento Mori artistic actions with contemporary icons, have been part of this initiative.

Additionally, Colección Solo celebrates international awards dedicated to different disciplines such sound art or AI Art . In 2020, the PowSOLO Award acknowledged the finest sound art from over 100 global submissions: 'Phonotic Readers' by artist Enrique del Castillo. This creation generates melodies and sound patterns through light, motion, and celluloid. In 2023 launched a prize to recognise the best artwork made with artificial intelligence and the winner was Lars Nagler.

In addition, Colección SOLO supports various international art fairs with acquisition prizes. In 2023, Sandra Vasquez de la Horra's artwork title 'La liberación del mito" won at the ARCO Fair. At Untitled Miami in 2022, Alba Triana and Pablo Benzo artists won SOLO's Acquisition Awards. In 2022, Richard Burton won the Urbanity award, followed by Hugo Alonso in 2023. Promoting dialogue and experimentation in contemporary art, Colección Solo actively engages in projects and academic conferences. One of these artistic experimentation initiatives is Ulyss3s project, which fosters collaborations between artificial intelligence and artists from various disciplines. The project 's debut work was the triptych ‘Persistencia de la Narración’.

== SOLO Independencia ==
Colección Solo is housed at Espacio Solo, a museum located in Puerta de Alcalá, Madrid. The architectural design of Espacio Solo was designed and by the spanish architecture office estudioHerreros (Juan Herreros+Jens Richter), an architect awarded by the Madrid College of Architects (COAM) Prize in 2018 for his work on the museum building. The museum was built in a relevant building in the city of Madrid called the Millenium building, in the Plaza de la Independencia, popularly known as Puerta de Alcalá.

== SOLO CSV ==
In 2025, SOLO opens a new space for contemporary art and culture in a former printing house on Cuesta de San Vicente street in Madrid. Since June 2025, the center has been gradually opening, inaugurating the different projects hosted by the organization across more than 4,500 m². The spaces are being opened and activated according to the exhibitions program. The facilities have been designed by the architecture firm Estudio Herreros. In March 2026, it hosts an exhibition by the artist Paul McCarthy.
