= List of Jelly Jamm episodes =

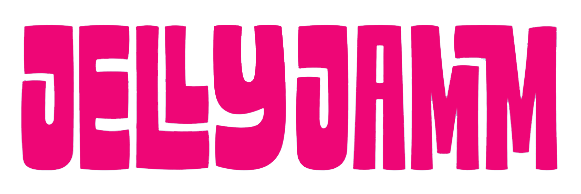

Jelly Jamm is an animated children's television series created by Carlos L. Del Rey, Victor M. Lopez and David Cantolla.

== Series overview ==
Season	Episodes	Originally released	
Season	Episodes	First released	Last released
Pilot		March 2009	
1	52	September 5, 2011	August 21, 2012
2	25	December 5, 2012	May 17, 2013
3	1	September 6, 2025	September 6, 2025

== Episodes ==
=== Pilot (2009) ===
Title	Original release date
"Pilot"	March 2009

=== Season 1 (2011–2012) ===
No. in season	Title	Original release date
1	"The Instant Gardener"	5 September 2011
In hopes of impressing the Queen with his gardening know-how, Bello uses a super grow formula that makes plants (and a dodo) grow wild and out of control! In taming the wild things Bello comes to understand how plants grow naturally on Jammbo and how things take their time.
2	"Mina's Party"	6 September 2011
Mina wants to create Jammbo's best party ever. When her Four Phase Fun Plan fails to achieve "Maximum Fun-ness" for the group, Mina learns to chill and listen to her friends for ideas on how to get the good times flowing.
3	"Mamma Mina"	7 September 2011
Mina is reluctantly drawn into a mission to help a lost dodo. Rita, with her self-professed "knowledge" of dodos, only makes matters worse. After a long search, thanks to Mina's failed experiment, the dodo's parents are lured to their lost baby. And though the dodo returns to its home, Mina has made a beloved little friend.
4	"Promises, Promises"	8 September 2011
Bello and Goomo promise to watch over Rita's favorite doll Princess while Rita goes off to the forest to play with Dodos, but they forget when they go off to play Jellyball. The unattended Princess is scooped up by King who wants to show his kingdom to the Royal visitor. The boys must lay siege to the castle to get Princess before Rita returns.
5	"Super Jelly League"	September 9, 2011
Bello and Goomo in their super-hero guises Jammboman and Sidekickman create imaginary adventures that bring them face to face with Mina and Ongo who also wish to play superheroes. The result: an argument about rules governing superhero play. It all becomes moot when the four superhero wannabes are called into a real adventure, saving Rita who is stranded on a ledge over Jammbo Gorge.
6	"Best Friends Forever"	September 10, 2011
Goomo thinks Bello is his best friend. But, does Bello feel the same about him? Goomo sets out to test their friendship but the constant testing makes Bello run in the opposite direction. Upset with each other, they go off to play with "other friends", but they discover that nobody is more fun and understands your special nature like your best friend.
7	"I Want That Too"	September 15, 2011
The King is having a blast with his favorite Jelvis toy when Rita asks to play with it. The King, who fancies himself a good sharer, lets her. Rita takes advantage of the King and soon tricks him out all of his toys. Though Rita feels triumphant at first, her happiness is short lived. Rita must discover the best thing about toys; when you share them with others you have a lot more fun.
8	"Rita Adopts A Dodo"	September 16, 2011
Rita finally gets close enough to a dodo to pet him, but only because dodo injured his foot. Rita takes the critter home, naming him "Godchilla" and nursing him with affection and too much food. The now overweight dodo needs exercise badly. Rita learns that caring for others requires what is good for them, not for you. And, in doing so, Rita now has a new best friend. Guest Starring: Bruno Coronel as Ongo
9	"The Jelly Must Flow"	September 17, 2011
On a seemingly normal day, Goomo steps outside for a nice jog when he notices that something is slightly different about everything in Jammbo - they've frozen completely. It's up to Goomo and his helpful headphones to find out what happened and get Jammbo flowing again.
10	"Flower Fear"	September 18, 2011
While exploring the musical nature of spring on Jammbo, Goomo realizes Goomo has a fear of Burst into Song flowers. In search of a cure, Mina conducts a series of tests to help Goomo deal with his over the top reactions to the singing plants. In the end, Goomo and Mina realize that when you understand your fears, there is nothing scary at all.
11	"Radio Goomo"	September 19, 2011
Goomo discovers a noisy boombox which blasts heavy metal music. Goomo thinks it is awesome but it drives everyone else on Jammbo crazy. Bello and Mina fool Goomo with a magic trick that makes the box "disappear". Without his "Whammer Jammer" box, Goomo is distraught. Bello and Mina realize how important Goomo's music is to him and make the box reappear. In the process, Goomo realizes that it's okay if they don't like his music, Goomo has plenty of music boxes to satisfy everyone.
12	"Royal Roommate"	September 20, 2011
Due to the King's weird sleep habits, the Queen kicks him out of the castle. Surrounded by dark shadows and unusual sounds, the King quickly seeks refuge at Bello's house, but they are a long way from a good night's sleep. After a series of strange bedtime rituals, Bello finally understands the problem and helps the King conquer his fear of the night.
13	"Tree Mystery"	September 21, 2011
Goomo falls asleep in the Whistlenut grove. Nearby, King tries to open his soda bottle with a ridiculously powerful machine that ends up knocking over the Whistlenut trees. Goomo wakes among the ruins horrified! Goomo convinces himself that Goomo is to blame! It's up to Bello and Mina to gather clues that get the King to take responsibility for his actions and clear Goomo's confused mind.
14	"Inventor Bello"	September 22, 2011
Mina invents a giant robot for changing light bulbs on Jammbo. Bello thinks the robot should be made to defend Jammbo from invaders. Without Mina's knowledge, Bello modifies "Jammbobot" causing it to malfunction and rampage through the planet. Bello discovers the meaning behind the words "don't touch my stuff!".
15	"Sound Detective"	September 27, 2011
The Queen's Song Fruit are being stolen from the royal garden. It's up to the detective duo of Jammboman and Sidekickman to solve this crime. Everyone is a suspect. Their listening skills and teamwork help them catch the fruit filcher. It's quite a surprise, even to the thief.
16	"Rita Loses Princess"	September 28, 2011
During teatime, Rita loses track of Princess. Rita searches Jammbo in a frantic frenzy but fails to find her best friend. Bello sees Rita upset. Bello vows to make her have so much fun, that Rita'll forget Princess and Bello does. But, when Princess reappears, it is Bello who feels friendless.
17	"Queen Rita"	September 29, 2011
The Queen goes on vacation, leaving King with lots of responsibilities. King leaps into action, finding someone else to do it. Rita will help the King...if Rita's made Queen of Jammbo! At first, all the kids are happy one of their own is in charge. But, soon the fun and games are replaced by games that make only Rita happy and everyone else sad. The tiny Queen must realize how the power is going to her head.
18	"Scary Stories"	September 30, 2011
The kids are sitting around a campfire alongside Goomo, who is telling scary stories. Goomo tells the scariest monster story and then goes off to get a snack, but Goomo is gone too long. The others must look for him in the dark woods. Before long, a mysterious shadow and sounds have them all thinking a monster is stalking them.
19	"Flying Lies"	October 1, 2011
Bello makes a mistake and decides to make up a story, which is hard to believe. Mina gets angry and will put him to the test with the Candy of Truth, which makes you float every time you lie. Bello accepts the challenge and a spiral of lies and dangerous heights begins.
20	"Mina's Swing"	October 2, 2011
Mina tries to please the King by building the most amazing swing in the history of Jammbo. Unfortunately, the young scientist will soon discover that no matter how advanced technology is, it will never substitute teamwork and friendship.
21	"Apprentice Bello"	January 9, 2012
Bello is given a very important job: Bello's put in charge of running the Music Factory. Though the Queen leaves him the instruction manual, Bello ignores it. As soon as Queen goes off for a much needed rest, the whole operation goes way crazy. The poor dodos work hard to set things right, but without an informed boss disaster looms. Bello must learn, and fast, that preparation is the key to performing any task.
22	"Cheating Bracelets"	January 10, 2012
Rita is tired of losing at every game Rita plays so Rita allies herself with some stingy bracelets that will help her win at absolutely everything. Even though Rita is happy at first, Rita discovers that Rita's fallen into a dangerous trap, which will make her a loser. Guest Starring: Rob Rackstraw as the Cheating Bracelets
23	"Operation Save Jammbo"	January 11, 2012
While Jammbo's in trouble, its amazing music bubbles are full of trash and gunky goo. After a planet wide investigation, the Jammbonians realize that the junk in the bubbles is their own garbage. They work together to change their sloppy habits and restore Jammbo's jelly-good health. In the process, they recycle their garbage into something they can all enjoy.
24	"Experiments in Invisibility"	January 12, 2012
Thanks to some breakthrough science, Mina is able to make objects, and herself, invisible. Mina cannot help, but see the effects of invisibility on her unsuspecting friends! After a day of wild happenings the kids discover the culprit of all the invisible weirdness. They come up with an experiment of their own to see how much the scientist likes being tested.
25	"Musical Aurora"	January 13, 2012
One of the most amazing events that Jammbo has ever experienced is about to occur, and Goomo does not want to miss it. That's why Goomo tries to hide his jelly measles from his friends. Unfortunately, the measles have symptoms that are impossible to disguise.
26	"Haunted Castle"	January 14, 2012
Spooked by lightning and thunder, Bello and Goomo seek refuge in the music factory. But once inside, they realize there is much scarier stuff afoot; there's a ghost in the castle that's frightening the dodos and keeping them from making music bubbles! And if the dodos stop, Jammbo has no music. If there is no music, the planet freezes. It is up to the boys to find the ghost and get the dodos working again.
27	"Inner Space"	May 7, 2012
The King does not want to share his new rocket powered skateboard so he hides it in a magic box. Goomo and Bello decide to claim it, challenging the King's wishes, and end up in a new and larger world. A world of fun and danger.
28	"Queen's Birthday"	May 8, 2012
The Queen feels gloomy when her musical bamboo plant withers. The King and the children agree to organize the best birthday party ever. Unfortunately each of the participants has a very particular idea as to how to organize the Queen's surprise party. Its success will depend on their capacity to put themselves "in each other's shoes", especially the Queen's.
29	"My Little Queen"	May 9, 2012
Bello is fed up with the Queen, whom Bello thinks tries to ruin all his adventures and games. On a starry night, full of shooting stars, Bello makes a wish: may the Queen become a young girl again so Queen can let him do anything Queen wants. When Bello's wish comes true, Bello will have to act like the crazy little Queen's older brother and realizes the task can be hard, difficult and at times dangerous.
30	"Goomo's Birthday"	May 10, 2012
Goomo is having a birthday and his hopes are high. Unfortunately, Goomo wakes to find his precious helmet missing. On top of that, his friends are acting strangely and they all appear to have forgotten all about his birthday. Goomo would be happy to have things simply return to normal. Luckily, Goomo's in for a surprise that could make this day a very special one indeed.
31	"Jammbo's Many Worlds"	May 11, 2012
Ongo hurts himself while playing with Bello and Goomo, so Ongo has to stay at home to rest for several days. Bello feels guilty and decides to move into Ongo's house until his friend feels better. Their different views on life will meet and together they will discover that everything, even the smallest detail, can be enjoyed if seen with open eyes.
32	"Great Student"	May 12, 2012
Rita tries her own experiments in Mina's lab. Rita will soon discover Rita first needs to learn some basics in order to avoid a disaster of giant proportions - literally, as Rita grows to more than triple her size.
33	"Unexpected Pianist"	May 15, 2012
Bello discovers his best friend Goomo has an innate talent for music. From that moment on, Bello will try to share his discovery with the rest of his friends. Despite how shy Goomo is, Bello will try to reveal and share the secret.
34	"Ultravision"	May 16, 2012
Goomo has lost the glasses Goomo uses to play Jammboman and Sidekickman with Bello. Both friends discover a blind Dodo wearing Goomo's glasses. With them on, the Dodo can actually see and play with the rest of the Dodos.
35	"One Note Universe"	May 17, 2012
Rita and Princess are having a lovely pink picnic including pink dishes, pink food, and pink stuff. Rita confides in Princess how Rita would like everything on Jammbo to be her favorite color. Rita rushes to the Music Factory and switches the multi-colored music bubbles to pink which threatens to make everything look and sound the same.
36	"Wild Nature"	May 18, 2012
Goomo and Rita enjoy their day in the outdoors when they suddenly discover a Dodo egg. The children and the small egg will go on an action-packed adventure before the egg hatches.
37	"Soundcatchers"	May 19, 2012
The Disk of Sounds has gone crazy and all the sounds in Jammbo have been changed, causing a huge chaos. Bello and Rita will be in charge of returning each sound to the place where it belongs.
38	"One-Eyed Bello"	May 20, 2012
Bello has to wear an eye patch. Bello feels uncomfortable and discouraged because of how he looks. Luckily, his friends tell him a pirate story in which Bello is the main character to remind him that any problem can turn into something fun.
39	"Goomo's Race"	May 23, 2012
Goomo has decided to take 100,000 steps with a pair of magic sneakers that will lead him to an amazing treasure. At least that's what Goomo believes because his friends think Goomo's gone crazy.
40	"Agent Mina"	May 24, 2012
Mina wants to become a special agent to return Rita's doll Princess from the clutches of the King, and does so with the help of "inventions" made out of everyday objects. Mina will soon prove to her friends that science does not need to be boring. In fact, it can be a secret agent's best resource.
41	"Color of Fun"	May 25, 2012
The children get wound up in a tag-playing competition to see who the best team in the universe is. They begin to see the other team members as enemies even when they are not playing. Someone will have to teach them the difference between rivalry and turning against each other.
42	"Flying Bathtub"	May 26, 2012
The King is impatient to try out his new acquisition called "a bathtub that flies to music". When the King steps away momentarily, Bello and Mina end up being the first to try it.
43	"Silent Sheriff"	May 27, 2012
Bello suddenly has great powers thanks to a sheriff star badge that grants his every wish. His new responsibility empowers him so much that Bello ends up wishing for something he will soon regret.
44	"Back-Up"	May 28, 2012
The King has hurt his back. Everyone thinks of a plan to transport him safely to his comfortable bed back in the castle. They must learn to listen to each other and consider even the most absurd options because you never know where the answer might be.
45	"Rhythm Judge"	May 29, 2012
Goomo has to judge a dance contest. At first, the decision seems easy but when he discovers that choosing a winner means choosing a loser before he loses the friend does so much responsibility.
46	"Royal Frame"	May 30, 2012
It's a wonderful day to draw and the children gather around excitedly. Bello knows his drawings are the Queen's favorite and Bello cannot wait to show her his latest one. Unfortunately, the Queen is too busy trying to teach Rita how to draw like the rest of the kids, which seems very unfair to Bello.
47	"White Dodo"	June 4, 2012
The children get a surprise visit from a White Dodo. All of them, especially Ongo, make friends with this incredible animal. Unfortunately, the White Dodo has a mission to accomplish and a separation seems inevitable. Despite the sad goodbye, there is always music to cheer them up.
48	"Questions, Questions"	June 5, 2012
Mina is in awe after reading Eudoro the Wise's biography. For her, there is nothing more important than wisdom. That's why Mina will avoid asking questions that would reveal her ignorance. To her surprise there are things that everyone else knows, except her. Soon Mina will understand the importance of always asking questions to those who know.
49	"Super Speed"	June 6, 2012
Bello and Goomo dream of becoming real super heroes so they ask Mina to train them. Mina sets out to do a great job but Bello isn't ready to endure the long and hard training. Bello gives up and chooses an easier activity. Something Bello will later regret.
50	"Look at Me"	June 7, 2012
It is not always easy to stand still when everyone else gets praise and applause. Bello will try to steal the show during his friends' performances, which makes them very upset with him.
51	"Game Surprise"	June 8, 2012
Bello and Goomo are faced with an almost impossible task when they discover that all the toys in the castle have been placed in a single box. The temptation is great but they have strict orders not to touch the box for they would surely make a huge mess. Will they be able to obey that order and keep the castle spotless?
52	"Jammbo's Rhythm"	June 9, 2012
The Jammbonians demonstrate different dance moves for the viewers to follow along with in this interactive special episode. Each character presents a move, which they all put together at the end for an exciting performance.

=== Season 2 (2012–2013) ===
No. in season	Title	Original release date
53	"King's Clones"	December 3, 2012
Being the King of Jammbo is not an easy task. But the King believes it should be easy, so King creates clones of himself that he can order around, having them do all the hard work. As expected, these clones, much like the King, are so lazy, that instead of helping, they become a new and increasing problem in Jammbo.
54	"Grandpa Dodo"	December 4, 2012
Another fun contest in Jammbo is celebrated, in which each child, with the help of a Dodo, must search for the largest musical clover they can find. Bello feels at a disadvantage when Bello meets the Dodo who will assist him. This Dodo is the oldest and the grouchiest Bello has ever seen. Soon enough, Bello will realize that this particular Dodo and the special relationship they share, will bring more surprises than he ever imagined.
55	"A Day at the Races"	December 5, 2012
The King has just tuned his car and King's not willing for it to go unnoticed. That's why King's organized a race in which all vehicles on Jammbo will compete, even young Rita with her tricycle. The race begins and the King sets his cockiness free, thus convincing the children they need to join forces and do whatever is in their power to win.
56	"White Trainers"	December 6, 2012
When Goomo's flip flops finally break, the Queen gives him a new, shiny pair of sneakers. Goomo is so taken back with the hypnotic whiteness of his new sneakers, that Goomo is incapable of anything else. The question is...is it worth having sneakers if you can't run through the mud or kick a ball with them?
57	"Lost Dodo"	December 7, 2012
Rita and the Queen take a walk through the mysterious "changing forest" when they discover a baby Dodo who has strayed away from its parents and is lost in this strange place. During the rescue operation, Rita gets lost as well. Rita will need to apply her astuteness in order to find the baby Dodo and return to her friends.
58	"Dodo Butterfly"	December 8, 2012
One of Mina's experiments provokes a Dodo Butterfly to grow to mammoth proportions. At the beginning, the animal scares away the people on Jammbo but the Dodo Butterfly and the children will soon experience a beautiful and unexpected friendship.
59	"The Story"	December 9, 2012
Rita has a lot of good qualities but patience is not one of them. That's why Rita is incapable of waiting until bedtime to read the next chapter of a book the Queen is guarding. The kids will join forces with Bello in a crazy attempt to get the book, and know as soon as possible how the story ends.
60	"Home Flying Home"	January 6, 2013
Mina loses her house because of Rita, so the little one invites her friend to her house to live with her. This new experience, that seemed so fun at the beginning, will end up being a real challenge.
61	"The Man That Could Be King"	January 7, 2013
It is become obvious to the Queen that the King has become too dependent on the Dodos; the King should be more self-sufficient. So when the Queen expresses her doubts, the King is forced to prove that King is, indeed, someone capable of reigning.
62	"The Monster of Boredom"	January 8, 2013
It's a dark and rainy afternoon in Jammbo. The kids are sad because they cannot go out, so the King proposes a fun activity: telling a story taking turns. Altogether, they create a story that will surprise them and even transform them into Zombies of Boredom.
63	"The Gift Is The Gift"	January 9, 2013
Bello is very surprised when he hears the King saying that it's better to give gifts than to receive them. Bello will do his best to prove that theory. Unfortunately, his attempts will not turn out right for Goomo.
64	"Double Bello"	January 10, 2013
Who says you can't do two things at the same time? Bello will try to prove that such a thing is possible and will try to take care of the King while celebrating a birthday.
65	"The Fall of Jammboman"	January 13, 2013
Sidekickman realizes that to Jammboman Sidekickman is nothing but a petty assistant. That will make Sidekickman reconsider his loyalties and adopt a new and terrible personality.
66	"Professor Goomo"	January 14, 2013
Bello is bored because Goomo is unable to learn new games, so Goomo makes Mina turn him into a smarter Goomo. The problem is that now Goomo is the one who gets bored playing the games that Bello wants to play.
67	"Princess Smile"	January 15, 2013
An accident with a toothbrush causes Princess to lose her smile. Rita feels so sad that Rita promises not to brush her teeth ever again. Her friends do their best to prevent her from following through with her promise and, incidentally, make Princess recover her smile.
68	"The Sticker"	January 16, 2013
The King finds some old stickers which are used to show that someone has a special talent. Bello will do his best to get a big sticker but unfortunately, things won't end up as Bello imagined. Or maybe they will.
69	"Assistant Grandpa"	May 9, 2013
Grandpa Dodo is always there when someone needs him. When the kids realize this, Grandpa Dodo gets into trouble as they start to need him even for the most trivial things.
70	"The Plant"	May 10, 2013
The kids find it really fun to show their skills in gardening and to take care of a very special plant. Unfortunately, to take good care of something you need to have perseverance, a very difficult thing for Bello.
71	"Repetition, Repetition"	May 11, 2013
Rita learns a new game called "The Repetition Game", and Rita is very good at it. Rita will try the patience of all her friends over and over. There is only one option to make Rita understand how tiresome Rita can be: confront her with the best imitator in the galaxy.
72	"Perfect Toy"	May 12, 2013
Bello and Goomo get into a very challenging project by designing the perfect toy. A toy that has everything a kid would want so great that you could never get tired of it. After developing some ideas, they will find out that that object is a lot closer than they have ever imagined.
73	"The Camping Trip"	May 13, 2013
The kids leave the neighbourhood for their first camping trip without the King and the Queen. Their lack of organization and laziness will turn everything into a mess. Only by working together and being creative, they will be able to turn a critical situation into a fun camping experience.
74	"Choose Me"	May 14, 2013
Being the last one to be picked for a team is always hard. But if you consider yourself as the best player and it is your own best friend who does not pick you, then it's even harder. This is what happens to Bello, and Bello is not going to take it very well.
75	"My Turn"	May 15, 2013
The Queen shows the kids one of her favourite toys as a child: A trampoline! They all decide to take turns to use it, but Rita doesn't want to come down and does not let anyone else play, so the others decide to force her to come down. But her endless energy will put her friends to the test.
76	"Jammbo TV"	May 16, 2013
The group is having a lot of fun in the castle watching an exciting animated series. When the program ends, Goomo decides to stay a little more in front of the TV. And Goomo ends up staying there for days! His friends will have to find a way to bring back the active and fun Goomo they all know.
77	"Holding Hands"	May 17, 2013
Bello and Goomo win a relay race. The problem comes when they discover that there is only one medal. Who should take the trophy? The argument will lead them to announce the end of their friendship. Luckily the rest of the group will make them see that such a special friendship can not end for something so trivial. Note: This is a double-length special episode with a clip-show format, featuring clips from previous episodes.

=== YouTube-exclusive Reboot (2025) ===
Title	Original release date
"The Royal Toy"	September 6, 2025
Bello, Mina, and Goomo are given the task of creating a royal toy for the King, using only the $6 allowance the Queen gave him (because now legal tender exists on planet Jammbo, apparently).
