= Ćustić =

Ćustić is a surname. Notable people with the surname include:

- Filip Ćustić (born 1993), Spanish-Croatian artist
- Hrvoje Ćustić (1983–2008), Croatian footballer
