= David Cantolla =

Spanish entrepreneur

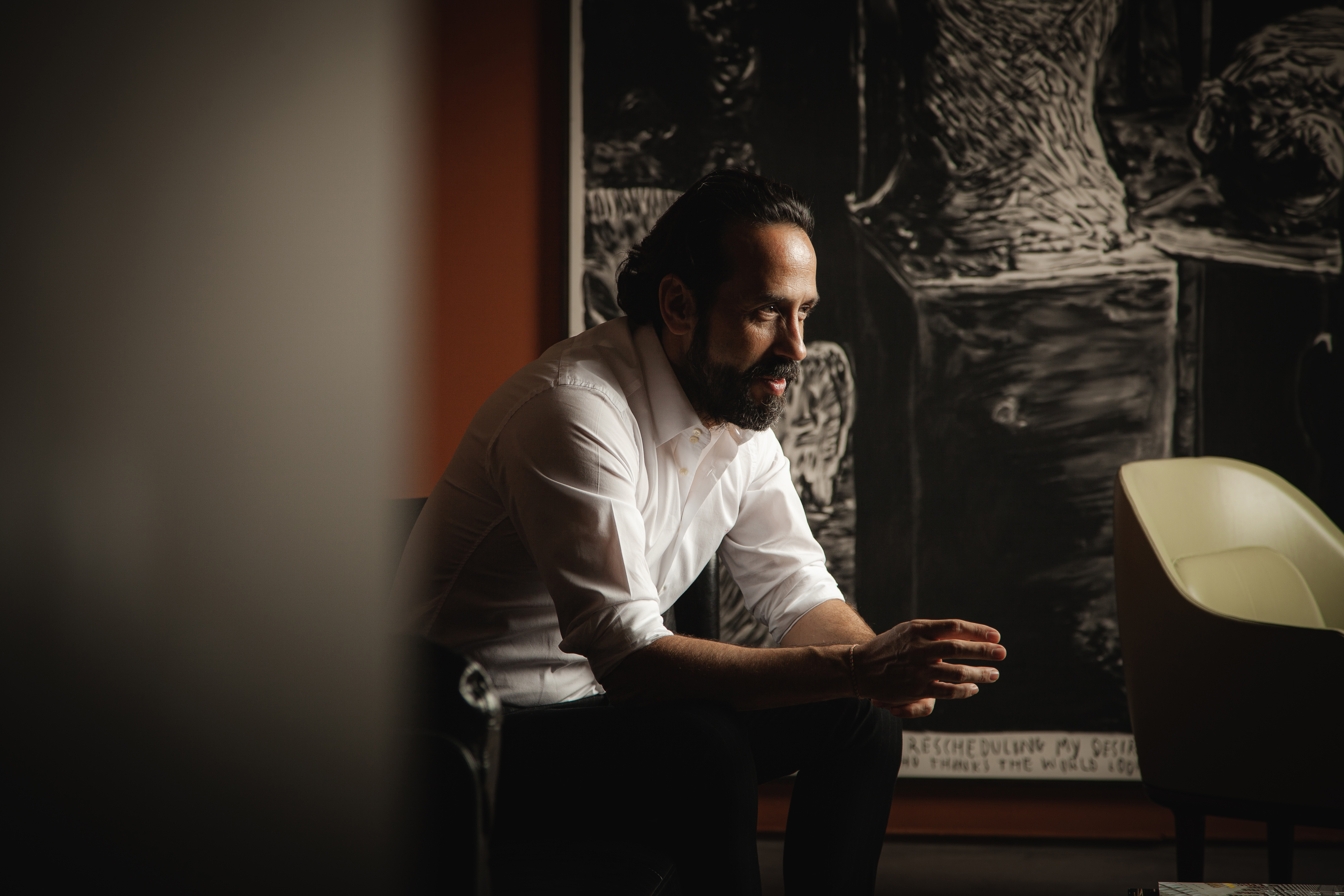
- Born: Madrid, Spain
- Occupations: Entrepreneur; Creative Director
- Works: Pocoyó, Jelly Jamm, Colección SOLO
- Awards: 2006 BAFTA Winner

David Cantolla is a Spanish entrepreneur, co founder of SOLO, an artistic project with a contemporary art collection, called Colección SOLO. He is known for co-creating and directing the animated series Pocoyó, Jelly Jamm, Pirata et Capitano, and Mola Noguru, among other business initiatives.

== Business initiatives ==
David Cantolla has been a founding partner and non-executive president of the eSports club Movistar Riders, which compete in some of the video games such as Fortnite, League of Legends or Call of Duty, among others. Currently, he is a founding partner of the company Movistar KOI/OverActive Media.

He initiated several companies, including Teknoland in 1996 (sold to Telefónica de España/Terra in 2000), Zinkia Entertainment in 2001, Ilustrae in 2007, Vodka Capital, Sidkap, Wake app - creator of the music app with Jorge Drexler-, and The App Date in 2008, Bitoon Games in 2009, and Elevenyellow in 2011.

== Animation and video games ==
Together with Colman López, Luis Gallego, and Guillermo García Carsi, he created the animation series Pocoyó, named following a linguistic play by his daughter. The series, a Spanish-British co-production, has been broadcast in 150 countries and has received awards, including the BAFTA for Best Pre-School Animation Series in 2006. He is also a co-creator of Jelly Jamm and the video game Basketdudes.

== Art initiatives ==
In 2014, with Ana Gervás, he set up Colección SOLO, which features works by approximately 270 artists from 20 countries. The collection collaborates with museums and galleries, including exhibitions such human product by filip custic at Parco Museum (Tokyo), The Garden of Earthly Delights through the works of Colección SOLO at Matadero Madrid, NGV MuseumTriennial l (Australia), or with Mario Klingemann works at AI: More than Human at Barbican Centre (London), among others.

SOLO Collection is part of the SOLO project, an initiative dedicated to supporting contemporary art and new media experimentation. The project includes international awards, art spaces such as SOLO Independencia and SOLO CSV in Madrid, and SOLO Castanedo in northern Spain.
