= Black Room =

2018 video game

- Developer: Cassie McQuater
- Programmers: Cassie McQuater, Brendan Coates
- Writers: Cassie McQuater, Maia Asshaq
- Composers: Cassie McQuater, Ronen Goldstein, Brendan Coates
- Platform: Web
- Release: 14 June 2018
- Mode: Single-player

Black Room is a 2018 browser-based video game created by independent developer Cassie McQuater. Upon release, the game received positive reviews, with praise directed to its innovative design and dreamlike qualities. Black Room received the Nuovo Award at the 2019 Independent Games Festival, and was exhibited at several galleries, including the Smithsonian American Art Museum and New Museum.

== Gameplay ==
Black Room uses sprites from old video games for its visual presentation.

The game is played in the browser and requires players to explore pages to identify links to new pages. The game does not have an obvious objective or linear gameplay, instead guiding players through a series of web pages. Parts of the game require the player to change the proportions of onscreen spaces by the resizing browser's window to locate hidden objects with links to progress.

Some objects generate tabs to media links outside the context of the game, including to YouTube videos or stock imagery. Visuals are represented in a mixture of ASCII, pixel art and sprites of video game characters, with accompanying text reflecting the premise of a "black room" as a meditative technique for the player character to fall asleep.

== Development and release ==
Black Room was developed by Cassie McQuater, a Californian artist working in digital art and new media. McQuater created the game in collaboration with Ronen Goldstein, Brendan Coates, and writer Maia Asshaq. McQuater, who considers the game autobiographical, stated the game's inspiration came from her experiences with insomnia and anxiety, including browsing the internet late at night. She developed the game using HTML5 and JavaScript using the Phaser Framework.

The game uses repurposed sprites from retro video games, inspired by research into online communities that share sprite sheets and watching her grandmother play these games. She included heavy use of sprites of female characters intended "as a way to give them newer, more resilient narratives", stating that this approach was a reaction to the "startling" degree of sexualisation of women as characters in older games, aiming to subvert the intended use of these sprites away from sexual gratification for male audiences. Folklore and mythology were also recurring visual references for McQuater, citing the impact of childhood experiences in the Catholic Church, and inspiration from the "powerful narratives" of fairytales with female characters. Other inspiration cited by McQuater included the writing of Wilhelm Reich, and the book Digital Folklore by Olia Lialina & Dragan Espenschied.

McQuater finalised the game over a process of two years. Development of the game was supported by the Rhizome Commissions Program. The game was exhibited in several locations in 2019, including IndieCade, the Smithsonian American Art Museum SAAM Arcade, the TRANSFER art gallery, and an online exhibition at the New Museum.

== Reception ==
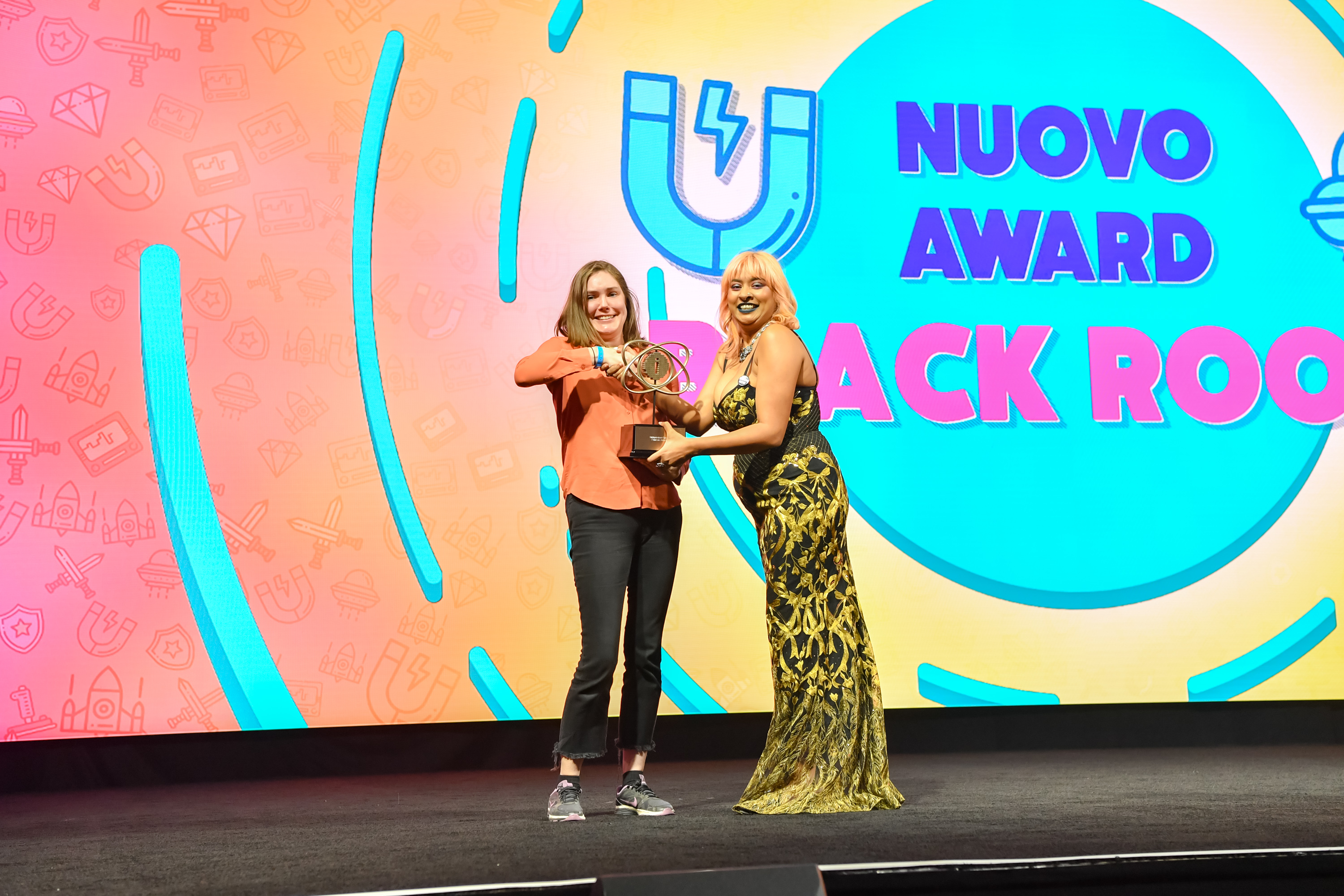
Cassie McQuater receives the Nuovo Award at the 2019 Independent Games Festival

Andrew Klein of Hyperallergic considered the game to offer new possibilities for game design into "uncharted territory", praising the game's twists in design and narrative, finding the writing "somber", "tender" and "able to balance the personal and impersonal, linear progressions and dream logic".

Independent developer Bennett Foddy stated the game was "ambitious and larger than any other browser game I can remember playing", recognising its feminist, surrealist and darkly utopian themes. Describing the game as a "trove of mysteries and weird beauties", Clayton Purdom of The A.V. Club commended the game's "dreamy, gothic beauty", comparing it to the work of film director David Lynch. Observer described the game as "intellectually stimulating" and an "eerie, trancelike journey through increasingly menacing dreamscapes". Matt Stromberg of Contemporary Art Review LA praised the "hypnotic quality" of the soundtrack and its "fractured narrative", stating that the game encourages "exploration and meditation rather than competition" through its removal of masculine tropes and gameplay goals. Julie Fukunaga of The Stanford Daily considered Black Room "pushes the boundaries of what is considered a game", highlighting its "tremendous amount of detail" and social commentary, but found the gameplay could be "simple and perhaps cumbersome at times" and "confusing and overwhelming" to explore.

=== Accolades ===
Black Room received the Nuovo Award at the 2019 Independent Games Festival, and was nominated as an Honorable Mention for its Excellence in Design award.
