= Zinkia Entertainment =

Spanish animation production company

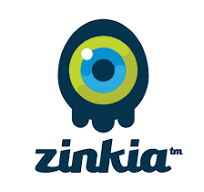
- Type: Private
- Industry: Animation
- Founded: 2001; 25 years ago
- Founder: David Cantolla López; Colman López
- Headquarters: Madrid, Spain
- Number of locations: 1
- Area served: Worldwide
- Products: Pocoyo (2002-2023)
- Subsidiaries: Animaj SAS (7.99%); KOYI Talent
- Website: Spanish: zinkia.com English: zinkia.com/en

Zinkia Entertainment (or simply Zinkia, styled in lowercase as zinkia) is a Spanish production company located in Madrid, Spain. Its main focus is to create animated series for TV and games, for mobile devices and for game platforms. The company has more than 100 employees and their series have been sold in more than 95 countries worldwide. Zinkia was founded in 2001 by David Cantolla López and his brother Colman López, together with José María Castillejo as a capital partner.

== History ==
In June 2006, one of its television series, Pocoyo, was awarded at the 30th International Festival of Annecy with the Cristal award for the "Best TV Series in the world" and a BAFTA prize in 2006.

In December 2007, Zinkia Entertainment announced that its managing director, Victor M. Lopez, had departed the Madrid-based Spanish animation production studio in order for him to launch his project; which was soon named Jelly Jamm. One year later, in January 2008 following the departure of Zinkia's MD Victor M. Lopez a month prior, Zinkia Entertainment had appointed business strategist Fernando de Miguel, to become its new CEO of the Spanish animation company Zinkia Entertainment and would develop its dedicated video game production division alongside developing new TV projects like Mola Noguru.

In April 2011, Zinkia acquired a 51% majority stake in UK distributor Cake Entertainment. This followed on the end of the partnership the company had with ITV Global Entertainment for the Pocoyo franchise.

In September 2011, Zinkia Entertainment had appointed former The Walt Disney Company Spain executive sales director, Iñigo Pastor, to become its general manager and would focus on the retail and commercial aspects of Zinkia Entertainment's numerous brands including its flagship series Pocoyo.

Zinkia Entertainment launched numerous Pocoyo spin-offs and two new animated series: the Spanish-French co-production Shuriken School(2006) and the pre-school Mola Noguru (2013).

After a bond issue failed, the company entered the red: in 2012 it carried out an ERE that affected a third of the workforce, and in 2013 it had to declare bankruptcy. In July 2014, Cake Entertainment's management purchased back Zinkia's 51% stake in Cake due to Zinkia's bankruptcy.

Zinkia managed to overcome this crisis thanks to Pocoyo's income, both in television rights and through its official YouTube channel. In 2016, it was acquired by the Mexican businessman Miguel Valladares, and since then it has focused exclusively on TV series animation.

In December 2018, Zinkia Entertainment announced that its former CEO Victor M. Lopez, who had left Zinkia Entertainment back in December 2007, had returned to the Madrid-based Spanish animation production studio and became its new president of the while he had established his own production company based in the Canary Islands named KOYI Media as they teamed up with Zinkia to co-produce & animate Pocoyo's 4th season in the Canary Islands as a co-producer.

In December 2021, Zinkia Entertainment had announced it had brought Gran Canaria-based CGI/2D animation studio and production company KOYI Talent following Zinkia's partnership back in 2019 as a co-production partner for Zinkia Entertainment's main flagship TV property Pocoyo, to expand Zinkia's production capacity, leverage regional tax incentives, and diversify its catalog, the buyout of Gran Canaria-based Spanish animation production studio KOYI Talent had gained Zinkia Entertainment its own in-house Spanish animation production studio & it gained KOYI Talent's three in-house properties like Bumpy: The Bear, which it had started production the following year in Spring 2022, and Ghost Bros, in which it was created by Yellow Kingdom and WeDoo Studio, as they placed them into Zinkia Entertainment's own catalouge as it established its own pernament in-house animation production house based in Las Palmas de Gran Canaria to produce Zinkia's own original programming, the acquisition of KOYI Talent had gained Zinkia's access to Bugsted .

In May 2023, Zinkia announced the sale of the Pocoyo franchise to French investment firm Animaj SAS for an undisclosed amount. The sale would include all IP rights, distribution, and licensing to the franchise but would exclude the educational portions, which Zinkia would retain. In exchange for the deal, Zinkia would acquire a 7.99% minority stake in Animaj. The deal was closed on September 20, 2023, with the franchise transferring over to its new owners on the same day.

== Works ==
- Pocoyo (2002–23)
- Shuriken School (2006–07) (co-production with Xilam)
- Mola Noguru (2013)
