= Mu Pan =

Taiwanese American artist

Mu Pan (born 1976) is a Taiwanese American artist who lives and works in Brooklyn, New York City. He is known for his large epic paintings.

== Early life ==
Mu Pan was born in Taichung City, Taiwan, in 1976. He grew up in Taiwan, and emigrated to the US with his parents in 1997.

He studied at the School of Visual Arts in New York City, where he obtained a BFA degree in illustration in 2001 and an MFA in Illustration as Visual Essay in 2007.

== Work ==
As a teenager, he picked his role models from wuxia novels, such as The Condors Heroes by Jin Kong, or The Journey to the West, as well as from Hong Kong cinema of the 1980s and 1990s and from Japanese manga and kaiju movies.

Pan is known for precisely drawn animal and half-human creatures, whose portrayals — usually caught in actions somewhere between human and bestial, and accompanied by the logos and uniforms of 20th-century culture — suggest a cynical misanthropy.

His subjects often appear to be engaged in violent clashes with antagonists that range from animal/human hybrids to martial arts hero Bruce Lee. Monsters in his paintings represent the current issues that he is concerned about, ranging from global warming, to racism, or to the US government.

Battle scenes are his favorite subject matter. Mu Pan believes that war creates great characters, and that one has got to be a great artist in order to fight a war as a commander. Drawing and painting are for him the most obvious ways to claim justice. He uses creation as a pretext to highlight everything he dislikes such as violence, conflict or lies.

A big part of Pan's approach to composition, line-work, and detail draws on the tradition of Japanese ukiyo-e woodblock prints. Mu Pan's major inspiration is Utagawa Kuniyoshi. From the Brooklyn Museum's collection online, he discovered Kawanabe Kyosai's Wars of the Frogs, sketches in ink on paper from the late nineteenth century, which inspired his series “Frog Wars.”

The first retrospective exhibition of Mu Pan's paintings took place in Madrid, Spain, in 2019 at Espacio Solo, Colección SOLO museum.

Mu Pan is also known for the commissioned painting he created for the movie Midsommar by Ari Aster in 2019.

His first monograph book, American Fried Rice, was published by Abrams/Cernunnos publishing in 2020.

== Exhibitions ==
- 2011 – KunstRaum H&H, Cologne – 'The Other Mountain and The Other Sea' – Solo show
- 2012 – 3rd Ward, Brooklyn – 'The Way of The Dog' – Solo show
- 2013 – Museum of Art Brut (Halle Saint Pierre), Paris – 'Hey! Part II' – Group show
- 2014 – Copro Nason Gallery, Santa Monica – 'One Inch Punch' – Solo show
- 2015 – Galerie LJ, Paris – 'Fake Cover' – Solo show
- 2015 – Worcester Art Museum, Boston – 'Samurai' – Group exhibition
- 2016 – Poulsen Gallery, Copenhagen -'Your Mother Should Know' – Solo show
- 2017 – Galerie LJ, Paris – 'Treat Your Mother Right' – Solo show
- 2018 – Poulsen Gallery, Copenhagen – 'Battles Without Honor and Humanity' – Solo show.
- 2018 – Art Central, Hong Kong – Galerie LJ, solo show.
- 2018 – Joshua Liner Gallery, New York – 'Bright Moon Shines On The River' – Solo show
- 2019 – Galerie LJ, Paris – 'The Sword of MUtual Demise' – Solo show.
- 2019 – Colección Solo, Madrid – Retrospective exhibition
- 2020 – Poulsen Gallery, Art Herning, Herning, Denmark
- 2021- The Garden of Earthly Delights through the artworks of Colección SOLO. Matadero Madrid (Madrid, Spain)

== Bibliography ==
- Monographs "American Fried Rice - The Art of Mupan", Abrams, 2020
