= Jelly Jamm =

Children's animated television series

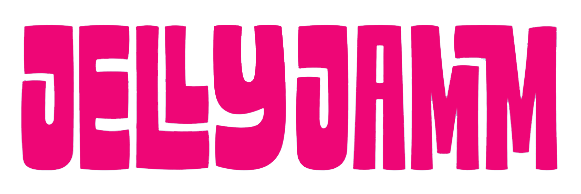
- Genre: Musical
- Created by: Carlos L. del Rey; Victor M. López; David Cantolla
- Written by: P. Kevin Strader; David Sánchez
- Directed by: Luis Gallego; Javier Ledesma
- Voices of: Lizzie Waterworth; Maria Darling; Emma Weaver; Isabella Blake-Thomas; Adam Longworth; Beth Chalmers
- Theme music composer: Guille Milkyway; Paul Bevoir
- Opening theme: "Let's Go Together!"
- Ending theme: "So Long"
- Composer: Guille Milkyway
- Country of origin: Spain
- Original language: English
- No. of seasons: 2
- No. of episodes: 77 (list of episodes)

Production
- Executive producers: Víctor M. López; David Cantolla; Steven J. Posner
- Producers: Carolina Matas; Salvador Fabregat
- Cinematography: Vodka Capital
- Running time: 12 minutes
- Production companies: Vodka Capital; 737 SHAKER

Original release
- Network: Cartoonito (pan-European); Clan (Spain)
- Release: 5 September 2011 – 17 May 2013

Jelly Jamm is an English-language Spanish animated children's television series created by Carlos L. del Rey, Víctor M. López and David Cantolla. The series is a co-production between Vodka Capital and 737 SHAKER, two Spanish producers based in Madrid and Segovia, respectively, and is co-produced with RTVE, Big Picture Films (credited as Big Picture Productions), Bestial Investment and Japanese company Bandai. It first aired internationally on Cartoonito and also aired on Spanish children's television channel Clan.

Jelly Jamm intends to "celebrate music, fun and friendship," and in each episode, the characters interact with each other in various games and activities, learning morals and lessons.

== Premise ==
Jelly Jamm takes place on a fictional, colourful planet called Jammbo, following the adventures of seven characters: Bello, Goomo, Rita, Mina, Ongo, the King, and the Queen, who live in a small neighbourhood there. The planet has a music factory where all of the music in the universe originates from and is produced continuously through bubbles. If the music produced by the factory had stopped, time on Jammbo would also stop, causing the characters to freeze. Each episode features a plot in which a character or multiple characters learn a teachable lesson which the viewers can learn from, and features an insert song which may be instrumental or vocal.

== Characters ==
Jelly Jamm mostly consists of a small cast of characters, mainly featuring the five main child characters and the King and Queen, who are the only major adult characters in the series. They are all residents of the planet Jammbo (Jammbonians).

=== Main ===
- Bello (voiced by Lizzie Waterworth) is a red Jammbonian who acts as the leader of the group and is described to have "an insatiable curiosity and boundless energy" and "a driving force among his friends", who he keeps close to; in particular, Goomo, his best friend and sidekick (as he considers). Bello enjoys reading comics, particularly his own comic that he draws called Jammboman.
- Goomo (voiced by Maria Darling) is a magenta Jammbonian who is sensitive, quiet, and friendly. Goomo always seeks a quick solution in any conflict to make everyone happy again. His solutions are often based only on feelings, making things either out of control or completely resolved. Goomo is a cheerful kid who expresses himself freely through his dance skills. Goomo is a little chubby and sometimes has a big appetite, however he has shown an interest in exercise. Goomo loves his best friend Bello and they love to play together, especially when Bello makes Goomo Sidekickman, Jammboman's assistant.
- Mina (voiced by Emma Weaver) is a blue Jammbonian who is the brainiest of the group with her best friend Rita. Mina spends time experimenting and making inventions at home as a scientific and curious character. These inventions, combined with her knowledge, frequently help the group, so Mina is a source of help when the others face adversity in their adventures. Mini Mina is a miniature robot likeness of Mina.
- Rita (voiced by Isabella Blake-Thomas) is a pink Jammbonian who is tender, sweet, affectionate, and playful. Rita is small and polite and enjoys playing dress-up with Princess, a stuffed ragdoll and her best friend. Rita is sometimes impulsive, leading her to ignore the potential dangers of Jammbo. Rita's favourite people are the Queen and Bello (who she considers her hero), who she wants to be like someday.
- Ongo is a purple Jammbonian who rarely speaks and instead communicates through sounds, dance, and music. Being very quiet, Ongo is depicted as highly mysterious, but still expressive. Ongo is the most skilled musician among the characters. Ongo lives in a "house" that he created, mainly consisting of a couch placed among a floorplan of rooms traced in chalk on the ground, without any walls or ceilings.
- The King (voiced by Adam Longworth) is a purple Jammbonian king who wears purple clothing and is educated and wise when speaking in public, but in private, he is more immature and mischievous. The King loves being the king and decrees things at random. The King spends most of his time doing "King Business", but what the King likes most is to play video games or look at his collection of toys and objects stored in his gift-vault.
- The Queen (voiced by Beth Chalmers) is a purple Jammbonian queen who wears yellow clothing, polkadot works while the King is busy playing, organises the work of the Dodos (who adore her), and directs the Music Factory to keep running. The Queen loves working in her garden, knitting, and playing castanets. In addition to all of this, the Queen slightly shakes her hips. The Queen has a strong moral sense and therefore is a great guide for children, though she may not always know how to respond to people's questions.

=== Secondary ===
- The Dodos are horn-shaped creatures with black bodies, green faces, and a hooked tail. Most of them work in the Music Factory, creating the music in the kingdom.
- Cheating Bracelets are evil bracelets belonging to the King and Queen. They usually convince people to use them, but whoever uses them will see them with traps. They win each time, but however, they may never release their user in theory. Each Cheating Bracelet can speak and have great powers.
- Jammbobot is a robot that appears in "Inventor Bello" and in other episodes. Bello remodelled it. Unfortunately for Bello, the machine had some defects and Mina arrived to stop the robot later. Bello then apologised to Mina and both made further improvements to the robot.
- Fred is a basketball and a dancer who wears tap dancing shoes.
- The Sun is a personification of the sun who wakes up the main cast every morning.
- The Taunting Skull is a giant skull who loves to taunt adventurers seeking treasures with challenges that test their value. The Taunting Skull only appears in the episode "One-Eyed Bello".
- Dodo Dancer is a forest-living dodo that loves music like every creature in Jammbo, but is noted among other dodos for its red, unique dancing suit and its dances.
- Grandpa Dodo, also known as Dodo Sensei, is a wise Dodo who is thousands of years old.

== Songs ==
Jelly Jamm is known for its music and songs, either at the beginning, middle, or end of each episode, which are also popularly known as "Jelly Songs" or "Jelly Sounds" in the UK. Below are the original names of the songs.

- Let's Go Together!
- Jump Now!
- You Are Great
- Holding Hands (Holding Hands Around The World)
- It's a Beautiful World
- Don't Be Afraid
- I Love You (You're My Friend)
- Just Do It!
- Together We're a Team
- You'd Better Smile
- Don't Get Angry
- We Did It!

- So Long

== Songs in special topics ==
This is a list of other songs that can also be heard during the show and each episode. These include:

- Flying Bathtub Rap
- Our Favourite Superheroes
- Play Time
- Surfing Jammbo
- Mina's Lessons
- Moving Time
- Jammboman
- White Dodo
- This is Jelly Jamm!
- Go!
- Jammbobot
- Fantastic
- Half Day
- Charleston
- Dodos' Theme

== Soundtrack ==
A Jelly Jamm soundtrack was released, featuring various famous songs from the hit series as a physical album with all songs in Castilian Spanish for the Spain market, in Latin American Spanish for the Latin American market and online in English, European Portuguese, and French (via Jelly Jamm's YouTube channels).

== Development and broadcast ==
The series' production was first announced in March 2009, when Vodka Capital signed co-production deals with RTVE and Bandai.

In December 2010, Vodka Capital entered into a broadcast and licensing deal with Turner Broadcasting System Europe to secure all EMEA rights to the series for airing on Cartoonito channels and blocks from 2011. It was Turner's first children's acquisition from a Spanish producer. The deal was extended with the second season in April 2012. In addition to the Turner deal, Vodka have also sold broadcast rights to the series to Discovery Kids (Latin America), Clan (Spain), Channel 5's Milkshake! (UK), Mediaset/Cartoonito (Italy), RTP 2 (Portugal), Télé-Québec and TVOKids (Canada) and Televisa/Canal 5 (Mexico). The series has also aired on ZooMoo. It has been available in over 23 languages across Europe, the Americas, Asia, Oceania, the Middle East, and Africa.

The series is also available in its entirety, officially uploaded to YouTube to stream for free. Several streaming services, such as Amazon Prime Video and Kidoodle TV, also house the series.

On 15 May 2019, Canadian company Blue Ant Media acquired rights to the series from Vodka Capital. The following year, they sold all their Asian offerings including the rights to the show to Rock Entertainment Holdings, a new company led by Blue Ant's then-head of Global Networks & Kids Ward Platt. On 28 June 2024, Rock Entertainment launched a FAST channel under the Jelly Jamm brand, which offers up children's content from Rock's catalogue.

== Revival ==
On 6 September 2025, Rock Entertainment launched a 2D animated web revival of the series on ZooMoo's official YouTube channel.
