= Cassie McQuater =

American visual artist and game designer

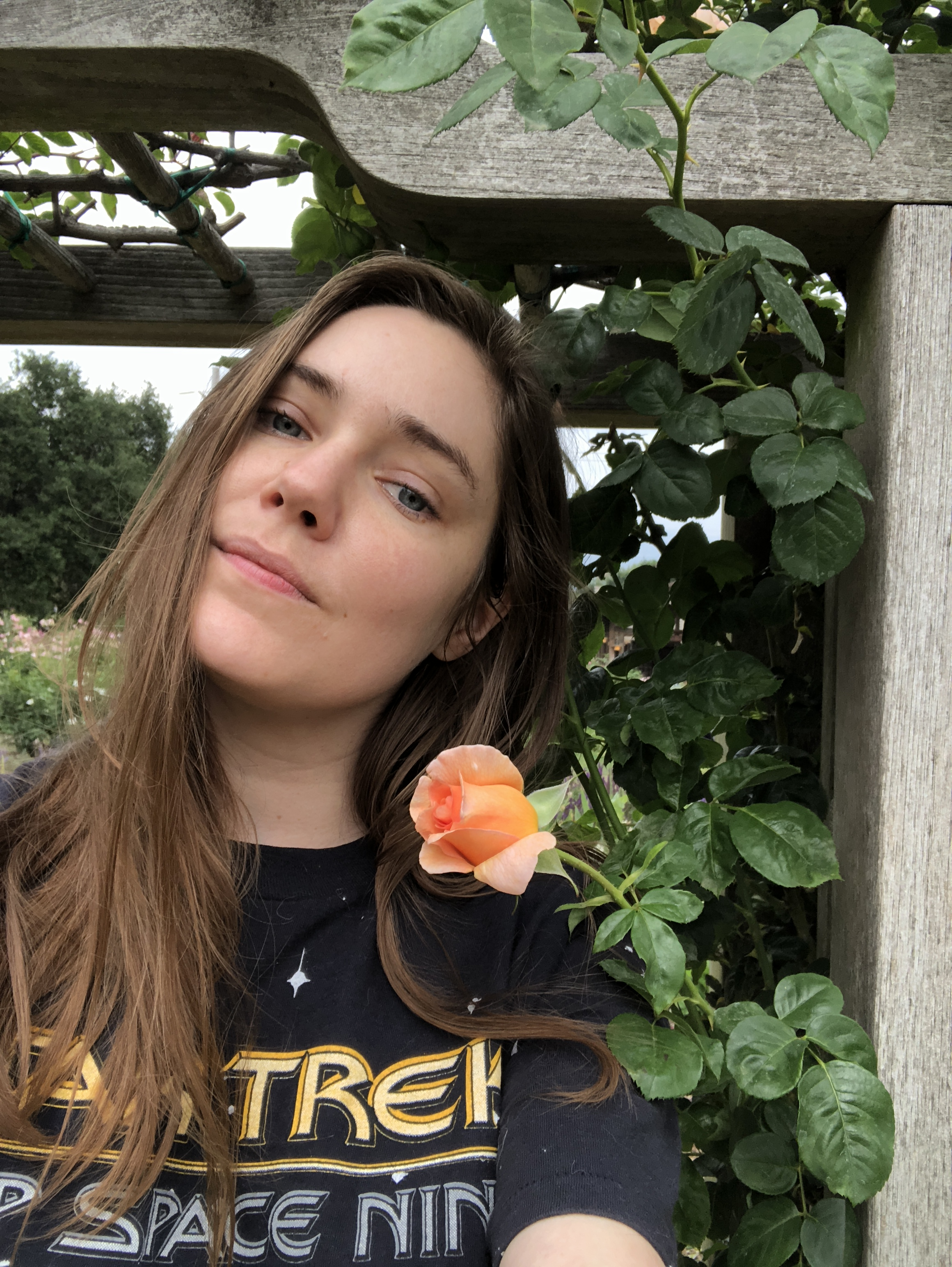
- Born: Detroit, Michigan, United States
- Education: University of Michigan School of Art & Design
- Known for: Digital art, Video game art
- Notable work: Black Room (2017)
- Awards: Lumen Prize
- Website: www.cassiemcquater.com

Cassie McQuater (born in Detroit, Michigan) is an American visual artist and game designer. McQuater's work has been exhibited in digital arts festivals and museum institutions in the United States and abroad. She is the creator of WomaninaVideoGame (2015), Black Room (2018), HALO (2021), and Love Birds, Night Birds, Devil-Birds (2019) in collaboration with New York-based composer Kelli Moran, among others. She was awarded a Lumen Prize in 2019.

== Early life and education ==
A native of Detroit, Cassie McQuater received a bachelor of fine arts in painting from the School of Art and Design at the University of Michigan in 2009. She grew up playing fantasy and role-playing games from the 1990s and early 2000s such as The Legend of Zelda and Secret of Mana.

== Career ==
Cassie McQuater's video games and storytelling often include all-female characters such as fighters, guardians, goddesses, and snipers in their designs. Her work has been featured in numerous game and digital arts festivals including the Madison Square Garden in New York, the 21st International Symposium of Electronic Art in Vancouver, the Milan Machinima Festival, and the MIRA Digital Arts Festival, as well as independent spaces and private galleries such DIY Gallery Arcade spaces in Detroit, and Transfer Gallery, Los Angeles.

McQuater is also the co-founder and organizer of Detroit-based music and digital arts festival Noise Blanche, which occurs twice a year at the Jam Handy building. In recent years, she designed the visual elements for the national tour of Detroit rapper Danny Brown.

The New Museum, New York, and the internet art platform Rhizome were the co-presenters of McQuater's online solo exhibition Black Room (2018) part of the First Look: New Art Online program. According to the artist's description, Black Room is a “feminist dungeon crawler." The project was awarded a Rhizome microgrant in 2018.

In 2024, her work is being featured in Sea Change, a group exhibition at the Pérez Art Museum Miami, Florida. The show touches on the impacts of and artistic reflections on current global environmental issues through time-based media arts.

=== Games (selection) ===
Black Room (2018) is a browser-based video game that touches on pervasive gender issues surrounding video game and internet cultures. The game starts with its main character in an attempt to relax and sleep via a self-guided meditation technic. Its aesthetics replicates Nintendo games from the late 1980s to mid-1990s.

Love Birds, Night Birds, Devil-Birds (2019) was created after "The Debutant" a story authored by British-born Mexican surrealist and feminist painter Leonora Carrington. The video game reimagines the story in which a young woman exchanges place with a hyena. The narrative revolves around the idea of women's bodies as poisonous gardens. In its form, the project works as an interactive and non-linear video game as well as a multi-screen video installation.

== Awards ==
McQuater is the recipient of the Nuovo Award and an Honorable Mention in Excellence for Design at the 2019 Independent Games Festival for her Black Room; she was awarded a Lumen Prize Moving Image Award in 2019; and a Rhizome Microgrant in 2018.
