= Ryan Heshka =

Canadian artist

- Born: Manitoba, Canada
- Areas: Artist, Cartoonist, Illustrator

Ryan Heshka (born 1970) is a Canadian artist and illustrator, born in Manitoba, Canada. Heshka's illustrations have been publicized in notable magazines such as Wall Street Journal, Esquire, Vanity Fair, Playboy, the New York Times and others, as well as professional art publications such as American Illustration, Society of Illustrators, and Communication Arts. His artworks have been featured on the cover of BLAB! books. As a professional artist Heshka has shown in galleries in North America (including Roq La Rue, Seattle, WA; Richard Heller, LA; Copro Nason, LA; Orbit Gallery, New Jersey; Rotofugi, Chicago) and Europe (Feinkust Kruger, Germany; Antonio Colombo Arte Contemporanea, Italy). His work is often considered to be pop surrealism for his surreal scenes, humor, pop culture references and visual language similar to comics and cartoons. He now lives and works in Vancouver, Canada.

== Exhibitions ==
- 2004 - "Miss Universe", El Kartel; Vancouver, B.C.
- 2006 - "Ryan Heshka: ABC SpookShow", El Kartel; Vancouver, B.C.
- 2007 - "Ryan Heshka: Neo-Pulp", Orbit Gallery; West New York, NJ
- 2007 - "Jolly Gleetime", DVA Gallery; Chicago, IL
- 2008 - "Don’t Wake Daddy 3" (group show), Feinkunst-Krueger; Hamburg, Germany
- 2008 - "Ryan Heshka: The OBIT Paintings (a BLAB! show)", Copro Nason Gallery; Santa Monica, CA
- 2008 - "Sideshow" (group show), Merry Karnowsky Gallery; Los Angeles, CA
- 2008 - "Ryan Heshka: Radio Science Funnies Inc. (presented by BLAB!)", Secret Headquarters; Los Angeles, CA
- 2009 - "True Self" (group show), Jonathan LeVine Gallery; New York, NY
- 2009 - "Envirus", Roq La Rue Gallery; Seattle, Washington
- 2009 - "Ryan Heshka: Electro-Wonders", Harold Golen Gallery; Miami, Florida
- 2010 - "Don’t Wake Daddy 5" (group show), Feinkunst-Krueger; Hamburg, Germany
- 2010 - "Super Things", Roq La Rue Gallery; Seattle, Washington
- 2010 - "Strange Powers" (presented by BLAB!), Rotofugi Gallery; Chicago, IL
- 2010 - "Lush Life 2" (group show), Roq La Rue Gallery; Seattle, Washington
- 2011 - "In the Trees: Twin Peaks 20th Anniversary show", Clifton's Brookdale, Los Angeles, CA
- 2011 - "Instinction", Roq La Rue Gallery; Seattle, WA
- 2012 - "Ours", Antonio Colombo Arte Contemporanea; Milan, Italy
- 2012 - "Don't Wake Daddy 7" (group show), Feinkunst-Kruger; Hamburg, Germany
- 2012 - "Disasterama", Roq La Rue Gallery; Seattle, WA
- 2013 - "Teenage Machine Age", Antonio Colombo Arte Contemporanea; Milan, Italy

== Bibliography ==
- Welcome to Monster Town (Henry Holt and Co. (BYR); First edition) (July 20, 2010) ISBN 0805088733
- Welcome to Robot Town (Henry Holt and Co. (BYR); 1 edition) (August 27, 2013) ISBN 0805088741
- Ryan Heshka's ABC Spookshow (Simply Read Books; 1st edition) (August 28, 2007) ISBN 189496568X
