= Pocoyo =

Children's computer-animated comedy television series

- Genre: Preschool education; Comedy
- Created by: David Cantolla; Luis Gallego; Guillermo Garcia
- Developed by: Andy Yerkes
- Written by: Guillermo García Carsí; Andy Yerkes (series 1); Ken Scarborough (series 2–3)
- Directed by: Guillermo García Carsí; David Cantolla; Alfonso Rodriguez; Paulo Mosca (season 3)
- Narrated by: Stephen Fry (English, series 1–2; series 5, part 2–present); Stephen Hughes (English, series 3–5, part 1); José María del Río (Castilian Spanish)
- Theme music composer: Daniel Heredero
- Composers: Daniel Heredero (seasons 1–5); Pablo Serrano (season 5–); Antón Serrats (season 5–); Tomás Virgós (season 5–)
- Countries of origin: Spain; United Kingdom (series 1–2); France (2023–present)
- Original languages: English (series 1–2); Spanish (series 3–present)
- No. of series: 6
- No. of episodes: 341 (list of episodes)

Production
- Executive producers: Kathryn Hart (seasons 1–2); Anne Brogan (seasons 1–2); Jonathan Doyle (seasons 1–2); Fernando de Miguel (season 3); Zacariás de Santiago Areizaga (season 3); Victor M. Lopez (season 4); Irene Rodriguez (season 4); Gregory Dray (season 5–); Sixte de Vauplane (season 5–); Simon Thomas (season 5–); Israel Tamayo (season 5–)
- Producers: Carolina Matas; Pilar Cubría; José María Castillejo (season 3); Miguel Valladares (season 4); Alberto Delgado (season 4)
- Editor: Catherine Williams
- Running time: 7 minutes (most episodes); 9 minutes ("Crazy Inventions"); 10–11 minutes ("Easter Eggs", "Pocoyo and Nina's Terror Show", "Pocoyo and the Haunted House"); 17 minutes ("Pocoyo's Christmas Carol")
- Production companies: Zinkia Entertainment (2002–23); Koyi Talent (2019–23); Animaj (2023–present); Cosgrove Hall Films (series 1); Granada Kids (series 1–2)

Original release
- Network: La 2 (Spain; series 1–2); La 1 (Spain; series 3); CITV (United Kingdom; series 1–2)
- Release: 7 January 2005 – 27 November 2010
- Network: Clan TVE (Spain; series 4–present); YouTube (series 4; special episodes)
- Release: 28 October 2016 – present

Pocoyo (Pocoyó in Spanish and stylised as POCOYO, pronounced [pokoˈʝo]) is an animated interactive preschool comedy television and web series, and media franchise created by David Cantolla, Luis Gallego, and Guillermo García Carsí, that premiered on 7 January 2005 on La 2. Until 2023, the series was produced by the Spanish animation company Zinkia Entertainment. The first two series were co-productions with Granada Kids, and the first series was a co-production of Cosgrove Hall Films, both in the United Kingdom. In 2019, Pocoyo was a co-production of Koyi Talent.

Five series have been produced, each consisting of 52 seven-minute episodes (Note: Series 4 consisted of 53 episodes including "Dragon Island".) along with 60 specials produced for YouTube. The series has since been renewed for a sixth and seventh season, with the sixth season premiering on 26 June 2026. English actor and comedian Stephen Fry narrates the English-language version of the first two series of the show, while Stephen Hughes began narrating starting the third series, titled Let's Go Pocoyo. José María del Río narrates the Castilian Spanish version of the show.

The fifth series was released on 22 July 2024 with the first 13 episodes on Max (now known as HBO Max) for Latin America and aired on Cartoonito in that region. The sixth series premiered on 26 June 2026 on YouTube, with future episodes planning to release on ITVX. On 15 September 2026, it was announced that episodes of Season 6 would premiere on HBO Max on 21 September 2026.

A half-hour special film titled Pocoyo & the Space Circus premiered on 23 November 2008 at Cine Capitol. On 21 December 2008, a one-hour special titled El Show de Pocoyo ("Pocoyo's Show" in English) premiered on La 1 to promote the release of The Space Circus. On 27 August 2009, another musical one-hour special titled Pocoyo's Big Party was released on CD, with a linear premiere on Clan on 31 December 2015. From 2014 to 2016, multiple half-hour specials based on various holidays were released on YouTube and Netflix. A second film titled Pocoyo in Cinemas: Your First Movie which featured the short film, Pocoyo and the League of Extraordinary Super Friends released in cinemas on 11 May 2018 in Mexico, with a Spain release on 23 June.

In June 2021, a spin-off series titled Yanko & Nina was announced by Zinkia to be in development and focus more on Pocoyo's friends, Nina and Yanko. However, the series would later be retooled into another series titled Yanco, Dina and the Dinosaurs in 2022. The series is expected to release in 2027.

In 2023, the franchise was acquired by Animaj. With the use of AI tools, particularly Animaj's proprietary software "Sketch-to-Motion", a new series will release every 12 to 18 months for traditional television and premium streaming services.

As of 2024, it has been confirmed that a third feature film will release in 2028 and a seventh series will release between 2029 and 2030.

== Overview ==
Set in a 3D space, called Pocoyo World, with a plain white background and usually no backdrops, the series is about Pocoyo, a four-year-old kid who is dressed all in blue, interacting with his animal companions Elly (an elephant), Pato (a duck), Loula (a dog), Pulpo (an octopus), Nina (a girl), Roberto (a robot), Valentina (a caterpillar), Baby Bird, and his mother Sleepy Bird. Viewers are encouraged to recognize situations that Pocoyo is in, and things that are going on with or around him. The Narrator usually speaks explicitly to the viewers and to the characters as well. Each character has its own distinctive dance and also a specific sound (usually from a musical instrument), and most episodes end with the characters dancing.

== Characters ==
=== Main ===
The series' main characters. From left to right: Elly, Loula, Baby Bird, Bea, Caterpillar (Valentina), Pocoyo, Sleepy Bird, Fred (Pulpo), and Pato.

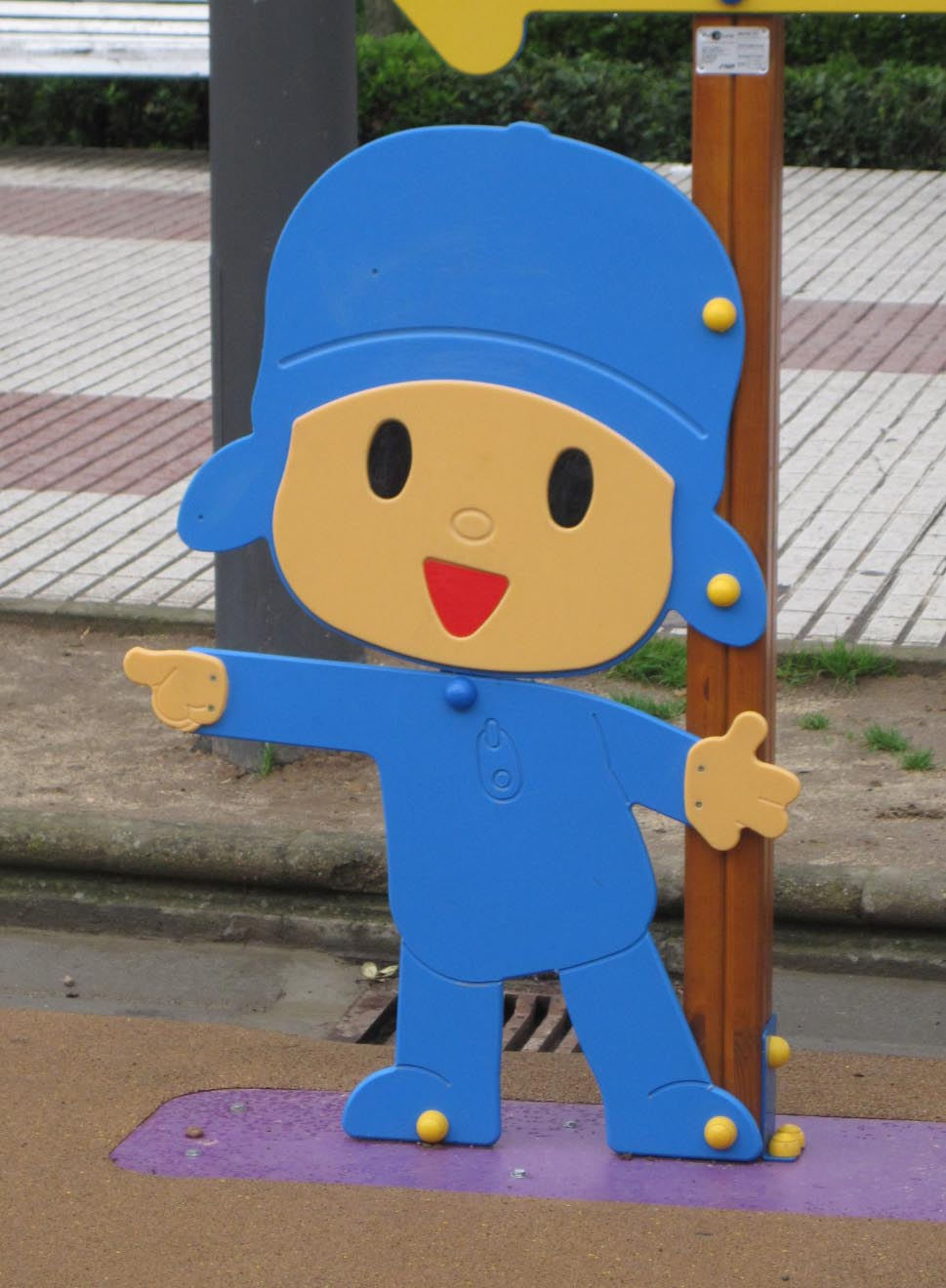
Pocoyo representation in a playground

- Pocoyo (Note: Voiced by Alex Marty in series 1, Montana Smedley in series 2, Isabella Foy in series 3, Gigi Hart in series 4 (part 1), Kai Melogno in series 4 (part 2) and 5 (part 1), and Rowan Alltraine, and Jakov Babić in Croatian in series 5 (part 2). Voiced off-series by Carys Doyle in Pocoyo & the Space Circus, Karen Martín Prince in Pocoyo's Big Party, Xoren Montgomery in 2017–18 specials, and Kai Melogno starting in 2019 specials.) is the title character of the series. He is a preschool-aged boy who is full of curiosity and loves to play games and discover new things. He is an innocent, happy, and childish character who is very acrobatic and moves at a quick speed. He has a red race car and a shapeshifting bird-like spaceship called Vamoosh. Although he is friendly and almost always in a good mood, Pocoyo is also highly self-centered, distracted by the simplest things, easily frustrated, frequently jealous of his friends, and can be very disobedient; but he tries his hardest to fight his flaws and learn morals, and often shows that he is affectionate and caring towards others.
- The Narrator (voiced by Stephen Fry in series 1–2 & series 5 (part 2), and Stephen Hughes in series 3–5 (part 1), in English; José María del Río in Castilian Spanish; Željko Mavrović in Croatian) speaks over the entire show and often communicates directly with the characters. The Narrator is sometimes physically involved in the events of the episodes without being seen.
- Pato is a yellow duck who wears nothing but a small green top hat. He has a fondness for gardening and is often seen watering plants and flowerbeds. Although friendly, Pato is the most fastidious and impatient character (indicated by his bill that bends in an angle when disappointed or shocked); on occasion he completely loses his temper, jumping up and down and quacking furiously with his bill spinning rapidly.
- Elly is a pink elephant who loves making biscuits and tea, and having tea parties with her friends. She also has a doll named Daisy whom she cares for very much, and keeps in her backpack when she is not using it. Despite her size, she is graceful and gentle, capable of ballet dancing, and serves as a mother figure to Pocoyo.
- Loula is an orange and magenta beagle puppy who is Pocoyo's pet and companion. She is mostly curious and shy, as she can be easily frightened. The character was originally named Lucas, after co-creator and director Guillermo García Carsi's dog, but was renamed and revamped as female to make sure the series had more female characters.
- The Audience (voiced by Grace Foy, Alicia Mahady, and Claudia Sánchez (Note: They also appeared "heard" in the first two series but their respective voice actors were not credited, as well as the series 4 episode "Magic Words".) in series 3, and Kai Melogno and Alba Ramos in "The Easter Rabbit" & "Pocoyo's World Sports Games" in English, and Vinko Klobučarić, Brigita Luketić, Antonija Luketić, Matija Đonlić, Lucija Đonlić and Paula Đonlić in Croatian) are a group of children who, like the Narrator, speak over the show, answering questions asked by the Narrator in order to assist Pocoyo in solving a problem or to let Pocoyo in on what's going on.
- Nina (Note: Voiced by Noelia Rodríguez in series 4 (part 1), Nico Stevenson in 2017 specials, Lucia Balas Gimenez in 2018 specials, and Alba Ramos starting in 2019 specials.) is another human character who is introduced in the fourth series episode of the same name. She is a young girl similar to Pocoyo who has red hair and wears all green. Like Pato, she greatly loves plants and nature. She normally speaks mostly a form of gibberish with a Japanese accent, but can also speak fluent English.
  - Roberto is a small, bug-like robot who is Nina's companion. Roberto has the ability to transform into other kinds of useful machines and shrink himself and others.
- Bea (voiced by Codiefia Darby) is Pocoyo's little sister who mainly wears yellow. She has a chaotic yet adorable personality which bothers Pocoyo with her antics. Despite this, Pocoyo is protective to her as her big brother.

=== Recurring ===
- Scarlet "Sleepy" Bird is a teal-coloured songbird. She does little but sleep, and usually flies with her eyes halfway open.
- Baby Bird (Note: Previously named Little Baby Sleepy Bird in early series 1.) is the small, always active and loud-mouthed baby of Sleepy Bird, who gets into tricky situations from which he is rescued by Pocoyo.
- Valentina (Note: Previously named Caterpillar until the second half of series 5.) is a yellow-coloured caterpillar with a blue bow on top of her head. She speaks in gibberish and has the ability to change into a butterfly and back at will.
- Pulpo (Note: Previously named Octopus in series 1 and Fred until the second half of series 5.) is a hyperactive but stubborn red octopus who speaks in gibberish like Valentina, and is very fond of opera singing. He can also be a comedian and can easily make his friends laugh with his jokes.
- Whale is a sperm whale who sometimes plays with Fred along with Pocoyo and his friends.
- The Ball Orchestra is a group of three ball-like creatures who play the trumpet, drums, and cymbals.
- Aliens are a family of small tripodal one-eyed alien creatures that Pocoyo and his friends usually find whenever they go to space. They communicate with one another using staccato 'clicking' noises.
  - Green Alien (Note: Sometimes referred to as Little Alien.) is the main alien Pocoyo and his friends hang out with. He first appeared in the series 1 episode "Up Up and Away". Unlike the other aliens, Green Alien lives on his own planet that has many cool things like drum-like craters and a button that changes the colour of other planets. He is also shown to be shy and easily scared.
  - Strange Alien (Note: Sometimes referred to as Orange Alien.) is an orange alien and Pato's brief love interest. In Pocoyo World, he works various jobs such as a postman.
  - Angry Alien is an evil green Martian who usually attempts to take over Pocoyo World. He first appeared in the series 2 episode of the same name. In Pocoyo & the Space Circus and "Pocoyo's Restaurant", Angry Alien is revealed to have many identical family members. He is also Valentina's love interest.
  - The Martian Brothers are a group of acrobatic Martians who love to host circuses. They first appear in the short film Pocoyo & the Space Circus.
- Tori-Doris are a musical band of sentient shapes that Pocoyo and Pato befriend in the series 2 episode "Band of Friends".
- Baby Spider is a small blue spider that hatched out of an egg that Pato found in the series 2 episode "Pato's Egg". Despite being kind-hearted and sweet, in his first appearance, he used to unintentionally frighten Pocoyo and Elly due to their fear of spiders, but later learn that he is not as scary as they thought.
- The Dinosaur and the Ant are a pair of best friends who appear in the "Pocoyo's Fairy Tales" segments in certain series 3 episodes. The Dinosaur and the Ant are shown doing activities like playing in the beach and shopping in a supermarket together. In the series 3 episode "Picnic", it is revealed that the Ant's name is Harold, though the Dinosaur's name remains unknown.
- Los Hermanos Chihuahua (Spanish for "The Chihuahua Brothers") are a music band of skeletons who play mariachi music.
- Yanko (Note: Originally named The Yeti and The Big Foot according to two early descriptions for "A Very Special Guest".) is a friendly yeti first befriended by Pocoyo and Loula introduced in the series 4 special episode "A Very Special Guest". Despite his large size, he has a big heart and cares about everyone.
- The Giant is a humongous robot-like character introduced in series 5. He lives on a treetop in Pocoyo World.
- Priszilla is a giant red sea monster introduced in series 5. She dreams of causing destruction in a city and battling a robot, which Pocoyo and his friends help her with in her debut episode of the same name.

== Intros ==
=== Season 1 ===
==== Pilot/Pocoyo Calls the Group ====
The intro begins with Pocoyo, Sleepy Bird and Elly already standing on a photo stage. Pocoyo makes hand gestures to call Pato, Loula, Baby Bird, Fred, Caterpillar, Whale, Green Alien, Angry Alien, Martian Brothers, Orange Alien, Baby Spider, Alien Family to join them on stage. While waiting, the remaining characters — including Loula — enter against a bright blue background. As Elly walks backwards onto the stage, she nearly falls but quickly catches herself at the last moment. Once all the characzer are in position, they strike fun poses for the photo. Baby Bird, looking sleepy, tries to stand upright and smile for the picture but gradually slumps and falls over onto the others. Right at that moment, the camera clicks. A finished photo then appears on-screen.

==== Pato's Forced Smile ====
The intro begins with Baby Bird and Fred pulling and pushing Pato (respectively) into position. Baby Bird tries to make Pato smile, but Pato remains angry. Then Fred steps in and forces Pato into a nice, good-looking smile. However, Pocoyo quickly changes Pato's expression into a weird, ugly, angry-looking face. Everyone starts teasing (or maybe tickling) Pato by tapping him on the head. Pato can't take it anymore—he explodes in anger and jumps furiously. The others look shocked just as the camera clicks, and the finished photo appears on-screen.

==== Baby Bird's Jetpack Entrance ====
The intro opens with all the characters except Baby Bird already positioned and ready on the photo stage. Suddenly, Baby Bird zooms in dramatically on a jetpack, sliding from right to left across the stage, then shooting upward from left to high above. He safely lands among the group in a perfect pose. The photo looks almost perfect for a moment—but then Bubbles' jetpack detaches and flies wildly upward toward the top of the screen. Everyone looks shocked (likely because the jetpack is about to crash back down onto the stage), right as the camera clicks. The chaotic finished photo then appears on-screen.

==== Loula's Breakdance Domino ====
The intro opens with all the characters already lined up and posed on the photo stage, ready for the picture. Suddenly, Loula bursts in energetically, still caught up in her obsessive dancing moves. She starts breakdancing wildly, which knocks into the group and triggers a hilarious domino chain reaction: the Oddbods topple one after another from Baby Bird → Fred and continuing to the left until it reaches Elly. Everyone collapses in a chaotic pile just as the camera clicks. The finished (messy) photo then appears on-screen.

==== Pocoyo's Group Huddle Fail ====
The intro begins with all the characters already gathered and posed on the photo stage. Pocoyo gestures for everyone to squeeze in closer to him. The group looks bothered and frowns in annoyance. Pocoyo pushes Elly closer and then shoves Pato's right arm inward to force them tighter. This makes Pato and Elly even angrier and irritated. Suddenly, Fred zooms in flying joyfully through the air. Pocoyo scolds him to stop and just do a normal pose. Fred lands and tries to act natural and calm. But right before the camera clicks, the rest of the character mischievously crowd even closer around Pocoyo, striking funny poses. Pocoyo looks shocked and disappointed as chaos ensues. The camera snaps exactly then, and the hilarious finished photo appears on-screen.

==== Fred Traps ====
The intro begins with Loula and Baby Bird already at the photo stage. Fred, with a cheeky smile, tells everyone to come up. Elly arrives looking confused, and Fred pulls her into position. He then quickly runs to Pocoyo, pushing him into his spot while Pocoyo sweeps his body in annoyance. Everyone starts posing Early, next Fred suddenly carries Pato on his head and places him in position. Just as the group is ready for the photo, Fred pulls out a button device. The others look at him in confusion. Fred clicks the button, triggering a spring trap that flings everyone (except Fred) upward. It turns out to be a trap set for the 5 characters.

==== Elly's Makeup Sneeze ====
The intro opens with all the characters already gathered and waiting on the photo stage while Elly finishes applying her makeup. She finally seems ready and strikes a pose... but then realizes she needs just one more touch. As she applies the final bit of powder, Elly accidentally sneezes. A big cloud of makeup powder explodes outward, covering the faces of Pocoyo, Pato, and Fred, who fall and sit, in a messy powder. Elly looks guilty and nervous with a sorry expression as the others stand there stunned or annoyed. Right at that chaotic moment, the camera clicks. The hilarious, powder-covered finished photo then appears on-screen.

=== Season 2 ===
==== Fred's Trap... With a Twist! ====
The intro starts with Fred, Baby Bird and Loula already on the photo stage. Fred cheekily brings everyone over. He carries Pocoyo to his spot and places him down, angering Pocoyo, who sweeps his body in confusion. Fred then pushes Loula toward Pato, causing them to bump into each other. Both soothe their pain while looking angrily at Fred. Elly arrives, confused about what happened. Fred poses happily, and everyone begins posing for the picture. Fred then pulls out the same button device from Season 1, ready to repeat his trap. Everyone looks shocked, remembering the previous incident. However, there’s a twist — when Fred presses the button, he gets launched by the spring trap instead. As Fred flies through the air, the others watch. It turns out the group was 2 steps ahead: Elly (holding a screwdriver), Loula (holding a wrench), and Pato (holding a hammer) had deactivated the traps, while Pocoyo and Baby Bird (holding no tools) simply smile at the camera. The perfect photo is taken with Fred trapped in mid-air.

==== Disco Trap ====
The intro begins with all the characters already gathered and posed on the photo stage. Loula then struts in wearing cool party glasses and confidently points a remote at the disco ball to turn it on. When nothing happens, he frantically spams the buttons, pressing them repeatedly in frustration. Suddenly, the disco ball activates, catches Loula, and starts spinning wildly—with her legs sticking out comically. Everyone bursts into dance around the spinning disco ball, grooving to the beat. Just as the energy peaks, the camera snaps the photo.

==== Chaotic Photo ====
The intro begins with some of the charactees arriving at the photo stage, creating a chaotic scene full of noisy talking and silly antics. Fred leans in and pulls a hilarious funny face right at the camera. Pato laughs at him. Pocoyo, fed up with all the disorder, pulls out a formal group photo of the characters (where everyone looks perfectly posed and focused) to show them how it should be done. As Pocoyo poses, he realizes a rope is snagged on his left leg. The tarpaulin backdrop suddenly yanks him, causing Pocoyo to trip and fall flat on the floor. Everyone turns to stare at the fallen Pocoyo in surprise as the Camera clicks.

==== Messy Loula ====
The intro begins with all the characters (except Loula) already gathered and posed in the picture frame. Suddenly, Loula appears, messily eating donuts and covered in food. Fred quickly picks him up and carries him over to join the group. Pato and Baby Bird immediately get to work cleaning him up: Pocoyo removes the plate of donuts and the one Loula is still holding, Baby Bird takes the Jamnica Sensation ribbon off the top of his head, and Pato wipes away the chocolate ice cream smeared on his front. Once he's mostly clean, Pocoyo steps in and sprays him down, leaving him looking fresh and ready. Everyone is now perfectly positioned and smiling for the photo. Loula holds a big smile for about 1.5 seconds before he grins wider, revealing his teeth full of cavities And food-crumbs gap. The others react with disgust, and right at that moment, the photo is snapped.

==== Portal Frenzy ====
The intro begins with all the characters already posed and ready on screen (except Baby Bird). Suddenly, a portal opens right between Elly and Pocoyo. Pato dramatically scoops up a scared Pocoyo and carries him away to safety. As Pato drops Pocoyo back down, Baby Bird pops out through the portal in his place. He then zips around wildly: first appearing in the top-left corner of the screen, next popping up at the bottom near Fred, and finally emerging from two separate portals on the top-right—her head sticking out from one at the top and her body from the other at the right. Baby Bird and Fred both flash big thumbs-ups to the camera in perfect sync, and right then, the photo snaps.

==== Button Fail ====
Take 1: The intro begins with all the characgers gathered and ready for the photo. Pato proudly shows everyone his shiny new button device, excited to trigger the perfect picture. He presses it confidently—but nothing happens. Frustrated, Pato storms over to the camera, grabs it angrily, and starts shaking it vigorously to "fix" it. Satisfied (or so he thinks), he turns and walks back to his spot in the group. But as he does, the camera suddenly topples over, crashing to the floor upside down. The screen's glass shatters dramatically, with the broken center perfectly framing Pato's giant, confused eyeball staring right into the lens. Pato spins around, looking baffled, while the rest of the gang stands there in total shock. Right in that hilarious, broken moment, the photo snaps.

Take 2: The intro begins with Elly carefully adjusting and positioning the camera until it looks perfect. She turns to the group and cheerfully calls out Everyone to get ready. But the other characters are too busy chatting and fooling around to hear her. Elly repeats herself louder—yet they're still not listening, lost in their own noisy fun. Finally losing her patience, Elly snaps and unleashes a massive, ear-piercing scream: The thunderous yell instantly grabs everyone's attention—they freeze in shock. Seizing the moment, Elly strikes her confident pose right away, while the rest of the group stands there confused and frowning. The camera snaps the photo, capturing the awkward, startled expressions perfectly.

== Development and production ==
The series' original logo until 2024

Pocoyo's name was coined by David Cantolla, one of the creators, after his then two-year-old daughter used it in her nightly "Dear Child Jesus (Jesusito de mi vida)" prayers saying "Eres niño poco yo" ("You're a child little me"), but not "Eres niño como yo" ("You're a child like me"). "Pocoyo" could roughly be translated to English as "little me", though it is a made-up construction. The show is animated with Softimage XSI software. While most modern 3D shows rely on complex, fluid movement, early Pocoyo was built on a very specific "Pose-to-Pose" logic.

The show was first announced to be in development in March 2003. In October, it was announced that Carlton International would co-produce and distribute the series, and that production delivery on the first half of the first series would begin in September 2004.

In March 2004, Novel Entertainment joined in production as co-producer with Carlton International and Zinkia Entertainment. However, nothing else was known about this initial announcement otherwise.

The show was showcased by Granada International at MIP TV in April 2005, with a broadcast window for CITV announced for the autumn. It was also announced that Stephen Fry would narrate the series in the United Kingdom.

The series was renewed for a second series on 12 May 2006. The makers also wish to embark upon other projects, one of which may be a Pocoyo movie. In June 2006, Pocoyo was awarded the Cristal Award for the "Best TV Production" at the 30th Annecy International Animated Film Festival.

In April 2011, Zinkia and ITV Global Entertainment announced they would end their co-distribution partnership on the series and that Zinkia would now hold worldwide distribution of the series.

In November 2016, YouTube and YouTube Kids announced that the fourth series would be released exclusively on those platforms. Zinkia CEO Alberto Delgado stated "In that time [10 years] Pocoyo has developed a truly global fanbase, so premiering the fourth season exclusively on YouTube and the YouTube Kids app seemed like the best way to celebrate such an exciting milestone."

In July 2022, it was announced that the series as renewed for a fifth series, along with a big shift with the development of the series. It was also revealed that Pocoyo would be getting a little sister in the new series, named Pocoyina.

In May 2023, Zinkia announced the sale of the franchise to French children's investment firm Animaj for an undisclosed amount. The sale would include all IP rights, distribution, and licensing to the franchise but would exclude the educational portions, which Zinkia would retain. In exchange for the deal, Zinkia would acquire a 7.99% in Animaj. The deal was closed on 20 September 2023.

In 2025, it was revealed that Stephen Fry, the original narrator of the first two series, would return to narrate the show's fifth series after 15 years. It was also confirmed that Pocoyo's sister, Pocoyina would be renamed Bea in the new series.

== Episodes ==
=== Series overview ===
Season	Episodes		Originally released		
Season	Episodes		First released	Last released	Network
Pilots	2		2002	2004	—N/a
1	52		10 May 2005	18 November 2005	CITV
2	52		7 August 2006	6 May 2007	CITV
3	52		3 July 2010	27 November 2010	La 1
4	53	26	28 November 2016	22 December 2017	YouTube
4	53	27	3 November 2020	8 July 2021	ABC Kids (Note: "Dragon Island" did not air on ABC Kids and instead had a one-day cinematic release at Cine Capitol.)
Specials	60	14	28 October 2016	13 December 2019	YouTube
Specials	60	9	20 March 2020	27 November 2020	YouTube
Specials	60	20	2 April 2021	23 September 2022	YouTube
Specials	60	12	7 October 2022	10 February 2025	YouTube
Specials	60	5	24 May 2024	2 February 2025	YouTube
5	52		22 July 2024	27 October 2025	HBO Max
6	20		26 June 2026	2027	HBO Max, ITVX

Five series have been produced, each consisting of 52 seven-minute episodes along with 60 specials produced for YouTube. The show was renewed for a sixth and seventh series. There is also an unreleased pilot episode entitled "The See-Saw". This pilot was only released in the DVD version of "El Show de Pocoyo" during 2009.

The third series was known as Let's Go Pocoyo, with episodes that have different segments. The 1st segment relates to the topic of the story, while the 2nd segment involves premises like counting, exercising, and learning about shapes. At the end of every episode (before the end credits), there is a music video titled "Let's Sing!", recapping the story and remembering all the objects that were in the story. The segments include:

1st segments

- Surfing the Net with Elly: Pocoyo asks Elly to search for videos (clips from the first two series) on her computer, with each video focusing on a specific topic in the episode. For example, in "Pocoyo's Band", Pocoyo tells Elly to search for a video that is loud and Elly shows him a scene in the series 2 episode "Baby Bird Sitting", where Baby Bird chirps loudly before a fanfare plays, and then he and Caterpillar yell at Pato in his face. At the end, Pocoyo and the Narrator thank Elly for researching the topic.
- Pocoyo's Fairy Tales: Pocoyo shares with the Narrator and the Audience a story of a dinosaur and an ant, the main characters and a pair of best friends. Each story follows the Dinosaur and the Ant enduring in fun activities, similar to the plot of the episode.
- A Quiet Moment with Sleepy Bird: While Sleepy Bird sleeps, Pocoyo shows pictures of objects (relating to the topic of the episode) and he and the Audience yell it out loud, thus waking up Sleepy Bird much to her and the Narrator's dismay. On the last object, Pocoyo shows Sleepy Bird it quietly and then yell it out loud with the audience while the Narrator bids Sleepy Bird good night to end the segment.
- The Martian Brothers' Show: While on their planet in space, the Martian Brothers usually discover an object (relating to the topic of the episode) and the Narrator and the Audience tell them what it is. Some variations of the segment sometimes ends with the blue martian taking a bite out of the object, with the others looking confused. A slideshow of all the objects are shown at the end.
- Professor Pato: Pato becomes a professor and teaches his students (Baby Bird, Caterpillar, and Angry Alien) about the difference between things (relating to the topic of the episode). Some variations of the segment end with either one of the students (Angry Alien (mostly) or Baby Bird (once)) yelling an answer at Pato's face, causing him to fall over or the chalkboard to fall on him. The Narrator ends the segment with the class on a diploma with a tag with Pato's face on it and saying, "Lesson approved by Professor Pato."

2nd segments

- Shape Shuffle: Pocoyo plays a game with the Narrator where he must guess what object Pocoyo has made using 3 select shapes. At the end, Pocoyo combines the objects together and the Narrator recaps each shape.
- Wheel of Colours: Pocoyo, Pato, and Elly participate in a challenge to take a picture of an object based on the colour they are challenged to find. At the end, for their second thing, they have a mystery character and once they found out who it is, the Narrator ends the segment with "Hooray for (name of colour)!"
- Fred Says: A parody of Simon Says, Fred plays a game where Pocoyo, Pato, and Elly must do whatever he says. At the end, the water fills back up with the Narrator saying "Fred Says: That's all!"
- Animals: Dot to Dot: When Pocoyo doesn’t know what animal the picture is about, the Narrator helps him by connecting the dots. At the end, the picture is finished and the animal gives their animal noise.
- Number Menu: Pato and Strange Alien go out on a dinner together at Pocoyo and Elly's restaurant and order a specific number of food. However, just as Pato gets ready to eat, Strange Alien eats all the food, including the table. She then gives Pato a specific number of hearts, making him overjoyed.

Series 4 consists of episodes similar to the first two series, but now with less audience engagement from the Narrator. Originally on YouTube, the first half produced 26 episodes and it became successful. Because of its success, the second half with 26 episodes was produced exclusively on the Spanish children's channel Clan TVE, ABC Kids in Australia, and exclusively in the Pocoyo Party game for the PlayStation 4 and the Nintendo Switch. Later in mid-2024, the second half of series 4 would begin to be uploaded to YouTube.

From 2016 to 2025, there were specials in relation with the holidays each year with few relating to sports. Following the success of series 4, these episodes were produced as a web series, and both series are exclusively online in YouTube.

Series 5 released its first 13 episodes exclusively on Max in Latin America on 22 July 2024. When the second batch released on 14 July 2025, the series featured more new characters like Pocoyo's little sister, Bea along with new locations expanding Pocoyo World. It also featured the return of British actor and comedian Stephen Fry who narrated the first 2 series of Pocoyo as well with Pocoyo speaking in full sentences with his friends, adding more depth for the story and appeal fans in a new way. Similar to the series 4 episode "Dragon Island", five episodes of the series were planned to be mixed into live action. However, this idea was scrapped, as none of the series 5 episodes feature any live-action scenes.

== Broadcast ==
=== United Kingdom ===
In 2006, the series started airing on ITV1. On 11 September 2007, Granada International pre-sold the first and second series to Five's Milkshake! strand. This deal meant that while the CITV Channel could still air the series, they could not air it within Milkshake!'s airtime. On 24 April 2012, Nick Jr. acquired rights to all three series to air on the network, as well as Nick Jr. Too. As of January 2026, all 5 series are currently streaming on ITVX.

=== Spain ===
In June 2006, TVE2 and Boomerang acquired free and pay-TV rights respectively to the series from Zinkia. The first series premiered on TVE2 in October 2006. The second series premiered on the network in April 2008. The third series, Let's Go Pocoyo began airing in 2010.

In October 2017, Clan acquired the TV rights to the fourth series. In October 2024, the fifth series started airing on the network.

=== Other ===
In April 2005, the Australian Broadcasting Corporation became the first international broadcaster to acquire the series. In October, Granada pre-sold the series to Treehouse TV (Canada), Disney Channel (Southeast Asia), TVNZ (New Zealand), CYBC (Cyprus) Gulf DTH/Showtime and MBC (Middle East), IBC (Iceland), EBS (South Korea), Alter Channel (Greece), RTFBH (Bosnia), RTV (Slovenia), BabyTV, Hop!, and LuliTV (Israel). At the time, deals were current underway for Germany, Japan, Finland, Sweden, France and Hong Kong.

In March 2006, Nickelodeon acquired French broadcast rights. This was followed up in May with Granada pre-selling the series to KiKA (Germany), Discovery Kids (Latin America), WOWOW (Japan) and MNET (South Africa), and Zinkia selling Portuguese rights to RTP in June. In October, Granada pre-sold the pay TV rights to the series to Disney Channel Scandinavia, while Yle acquired free-TV rights to the first series in Finland.

On June 2, 2007, Granada International named NCircle Entertainment its US home video partner for the series.

In April 2008, Zinkia pre-sold Mexican broadcast rights to Televisa.

In 2010, the series entered the Italian market when Zinkia sold broadcast rights to Rai 2 in March and the United States in April when ITV Global Entertainment sold the series to Nick Jr. for broadcast within the spring. In the US, the series was originally shown as 7-minute segments between shows before being expanded to a half-hour show from 23 July 2011, to 1 January 2015. Episodes of the show were made available on the Noggin app. Episodes of "Pocoyo Planet", a compilation spin-off series were also available on the app as well. In end of same year, the series also broadcast on Indonesia and aired by RCTI with Indonesian languages, the show also aired on Mentari TV (a sister channel of SCTV and Indosiar) in 2024.

Pocoyo aired alongside Peep and the Big Wide World in a shared half-hour timeslot on public television in the US from 2010 to 2021. It was distributed to local public television stations through American Public Television from January 2010 until January 2018, when it was picked up by PBS Kids 24/7 Channel.

In 2021, the series moved to US commercial broadcast on Cartoon Network on 13 September 2021, as part of their preschool block Cartoonito. The show was removed from Cartoonito's lineup on 23 September 2022, and was removed from HBO Max on 30 September 2022. The broadcast of the series on PBS Kids came to an end on 26 December 2021, and it, along with the show it aired with, was replaced with reruns of Dinosaur Train in a 7:30 AM weekend morning time slot instead.

On 12 September 2022, the series was added to Disney+ in multiple European countries.

In 2024, the first 13 episodes of series 5 released on Max on 22 July 2024 in Latin America, and started airing on Cartoonito in that region.

On May 5, 2025, the first season of Pocoyo was released on Babyfirst. In 2026, season 2 was added to the channel.

== Accolades ==
Year	Award	Category	Nominee(s)	Result	Ref.
2005	Animacor International Animation Festival	Best Episode in a Series	Pocoyo	Won	
2005	Animadrid Festival	Best TV Series	Pocoyo	Won	
2006	Pulcinella Awards	Best European Program Best TV Series for Preschool Most Voted Cartoon	Pocoyo	Won	
2006	British Academy Children's Awards	Best Preschool Animation	Pocoyo	Won	
2006	Annecy International Animation Film Festival	Best TV Production	Pocoyo	Won	
2006	Parents' Choice Awards	Parents' Choice Gold Award	Pocoyo	Won	
2006	Radiotelevisione Italiana	Most Popular TV Series for Kids (Italy)	Pocoyo	Won	
2006	El Chupete Awards	Best Animation Character	Pocoyo	Won	
2006	Zapping Awards	Best Animation Series	Pocoyo	Won	
2007	San Diego Latino Film Festival	Best Nickelodeon Animated Short Film	Pocoyo	Won	
2007	BANFF Rockie Awards	Animation Program	"A Little Something Between Friends"	Nominated	
2007	China International Cartoon and Digital Art Festival	Best Television Series	Pocoyo	Won	
2007	El Chupete Awards	Best Soundtrack	Pocoyo	Won	
2007	Sea&TV Festival	Special Animation Award	Pocoyo	Won	
2007	Festival Movistar Art Futura	3D Animation Award	Pocoyo	Won	
2007	FICOD Awards	Best Innovative Project	Pocoyo	Won	
2007	Zapping Awards	Best Animation Series	Pocoyo	Won	
2008	Parents' Choice Awards	Parents' Choice Gold Award (DVD Category)	Pocoyo	Won	
2008	Disney Channel Asia	Gold Award (Best Children's Program Promo)	Pocoyo	Won	
2008	Licencias Actualidad Magazine	Best Licensed Brand	Pocoyo	Won	
2008	PromaxBDA Awards	Best Animation TV Promo	Pocoyo	Won	
2009	Shanghai Television Festival	Silver Award (Best Foreign Television Series) Silver Award (Best Animated Short Movie)	Pocoyo Pocoyo & the Space Circus	Won	
2009	Gamelab	Best Videogame	Hello, Pocoyo!	Won	
2009	Campus Party	Best Videogame	Hello, Pocoyo!	Won	
2009	FICOD Avanza Awards	Best Digital Business Project	Pocoyo World	Won	
2010	Venice International Film Festival	Kineo's Diamante al Cinema Award	Pocoyo	Won	
2010	Asociación de Telespectadores de Andalucía	Best Program for Kids	Pocoyo	Won	
2011	TP de Oro	Best Children's or Youth Program	Pocoyo	Nominated	
2012	Toy of the Year Awards	Infant/Toddler Toy of the Year	Pocoyo SwiggleTraks Feature Set	Nominated	
2012	Nappa Awards	Nappa Gold Award	Pocoyo: Fun & Games DVD	Won	
2013	Parents' Choice Awards	Parent's Choice Gold Award	Pocoyo: Pocoyo's World DVD Pocoyo: Fun and Dance DVD	Won	
2013	Nappa Awards	Nappa Gold Award	Pocoyo: Dance, Pocoyo, Dance! DVD Pocoyo: Pocoyo's Circus DVD	Won	
2014	Nappa Awards	Nappa Gold Award	Pocoyo: Season Set Volume 1 DVD	Won	
2014	Amazon	Best Spanish App	Pocoyo: Pic and Sound	Won	
2017	Kidscreen Awards	Best Learning App (Tablet)	Pocoyo Playset: Let's Move	Won	
2017	Kids Imagination Awards	Mobile App (Preschool) Mobile App (Educational) Tablet-Based App	Pocoyo Playset: Let's Move	Nominated	
2022	Iris Awards	Best Children's Program	Pocoyo	Won	
2023	Kidscreen Awards	Best Holiday or Special Episode	"Dragon Island"	Nominated	
2025	Kidscreen Awards	Best Website	pocoyo.com	Nominated	
2026	Kidscreen Awards	Best Animated Series	Pocoyo	Nominated	

== In other media ==
=== Specials/Movies ===
==== Pocoyo & the Space Circus (2008) ====
Pocoyo & the Space Circus had its world premiere at Cine Capitol on 23 November 2008, as part of a charity. The special later had its linear premiere on La 1 on 21 December 2008, as part of the stand-alone special El Show de Pocoyo.

It was announced for international distribution by Zinkia and ITV Global Entertainment in March 2009.

The special centers on the Martian Brothers, a pack of 5 aliens from outer space that arrive in Pocoyo World to host a circus. Pocoyo, Elly, Pato, Loula and more join in as well.

==== Pocoyo and the League of Extraordinary Super Friends (Pocoyo in Cinemas: Your First Movie) (2018) ====
Pocoyo in Cinemas: Your First Movie released in Mexican cinemas on 11 May 2018. It released in Spain cinemas on 23 June 2018, and worldwide on 24 June 2018.

In Spain, the film grossed $28,000 in 40 cinemas and $34,000 worldwide.

The film includes a 15-minute short where Angry Alien is destroying the city using his UFO. So Pocoyo, as a superhero, and his team of his super friends (Pato, Elly, Nina, & Roberto including Elly's doll) join forces to stop Angry Alien from his evil schemes. The film also includes episodes from the series like "Ready, Set, Go!", "Crazy Inventions" and "Easter Eggs", plus Super Pocoyo shorts and Let's Go Pocoyo songs.

==== Pocoyo: The Movie (2028) ====
A third feature film of Pocoyo was confirmed to release in 2028.

===== Cartoons =====
- Ball
- Jump
- Sun
- Water
- Friend
- Big
- Small
- Run
- Stop
- Sleep
- Happy
- Dance
- Up
- Down
- Play

=== Video games ===
==== Console games ====
===== Hello, Pocoyo! =====
In October 2007, Zinkia signed a video game publishing deal with Virgin Play for the video game Hello, Pocoyo!, planned for a release on the Nintendo DS in 2008. The game was developed in-house at Zinkia.

In Hello, Pocoyo!, Baby Spider finds a magic felt-tip pen and whatever he draws come to life so he draws a disco floor which flips over and all of Pocoyo's friends disappear. The player will play the role as Pocoyo and search for his friends by using clues like colouring pictures and drawing objects.

===== Pocoyo Racing =====
Pocoyo Racing was released for the Nintendo DS and Wii on 18 November 2011, being published by Zinkia Entertainment and exclusive to Europe only.

In Pocoyo Racing, Pocoyo and all of his friends have a car race around Pocoyo World. The player is able to play the role as various characters including Pocoyo, Pato, or Elly and race against other characters in multiple worlds.

===== Pocoyo Party =====
Pocoyo Party was released for the PlayStation 4 and Nintendo Switch on 15 April 2021, and published by RECOTechnology.

In Pocoyo Party, following the events of the episode, "The Videogame Party", Pocoyo writes invitations to his party but Angry Alien (disguised as a mailman) steals the invitations but accidentally drops each of them in different locations. The player will play the role as Pocoyo and play multiple mini games to try and retrieve the invitations before the party starts.
