= Juan Herreros =

Spanish architect (born 1958)

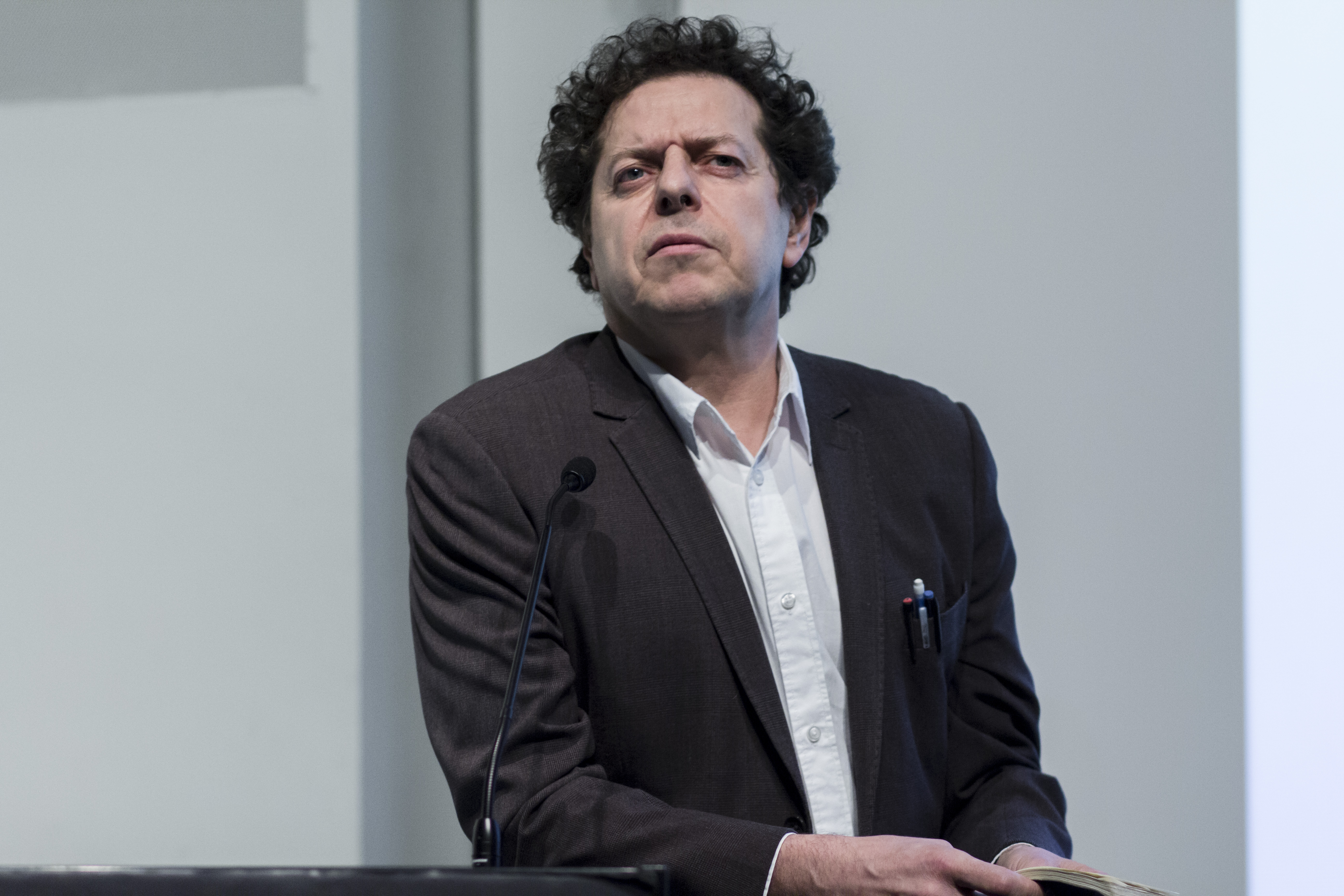
- Occupation: Architect
- Practice: Associated architectural firm[s]

Juan Herreros (born 1958 in San Lorenzo del Escorial) is a Spanish architect.

== Biography ==
He graduated in 1985 at the Technical School of Architecture of Madrid where after being professor of construction until 1988 he became professor of Architectural Design obtaining his PhD in 1994 and the title of Professor in 2010. Since 2007 teaches at Columbia University Graduate School of Architecture, Planning and Preservation in New York where he holds the rank of Professor in Professional Practice. He has also taught at American universities of Princeton in New Jersey, Illinois Institute of Technology in Chicago; and European Architectural Association in London, EPFL Lausanne, Ljubljana and Alicante. It has approached the architecture to the world of art in the second half of the twentieth century with collaborations with artists as different kinds Antoni Muntadas or the American Dan Graham. In 1984 he founded Ábalos & Herreros and in 1999 the LMI (Multimedia International League). He has been juror in several national and international competitions, biennials and international awards, editorial advisor of specialized media and member of several expert committees on academic, sustainability and technology programs such as the Material Science Congress at the University of Columbia.

His work has explored since the organizational principles of skyscrapers as a generator of generic multifunctional typologies. They were also pioneers in the use of diagrams and abstract information as display mechanism of non-evident relationships. In 2008 the firm Ábalos & Herreros, began to perform as two different platforms differentiating projects signed by Juan Herreros of those under the authorship of Ábalos. Herreros presented two projects at that time as the beginning of a new stage: A house on the island of Mallorca and architectural design of the art fair ARCO in Madrid; in which he applied urban criteria for space allocation and management of program uses. In 2008 he founded the Herreros Arquitectos after the break with Iñaki Abalos until 2014 where he accomplished the rebuilding of their practice under the name estudio Herreros, from which plays a triple role: practitioner, teacher and researcher.

His theoretical work currently focuses on his work and seminars on "Emerging Practices in Architecture" which takes its name from the Research Group directed at the Polytechnic University of Madrid based on the idea of recycling the figure of the architect and his techniques in light of new economic coordinates and the crisis of traditional modes of production which hinder the incorporation of new generations to the practice of architecture techniques.

Juan Herreros is an International Fellow of the RIBA (Royal Institute of British Architects); he has been awarded the Architectural Digest prize, the Medal of Arts from the city of San Lorenzo de El Escorial, named ‘Architect of the World’ by the Architects’ Association of the city of Lima and adoptive son of the city of Cochabamba, and has been nominated to the U.S. Academy of Arts and Letters Architecture Medal.

== List of selected works ==
- 2009-2019 Munch Museum, Oslo
- 2011-2018 Agora International Convention Center, Bogotá
- 2013-2014 Art Gallery Carreras Múgica, Bilbao
- 2011-2014 Landscape and equipment access to the city of Colon, Panama
- 2008-2011 Bank of Panama Tower, Panama City
- 2012 Exhibition "Dialogue Architecture", Venice Biennale
- 2011 "Communication Hut", South Korea
- 2010-2011 New Exhibition Rooms of the Reina Sofia Museum, Madrid
- 2007-2010 Garoza House, Ávila
- 2009-2010 Control Center Hispasat, Arganda del Rey
- 2010 PMC. Strategic Project Madrid Centro
- 2009 Installation and VIP room of Arco Contemporary Art Fair, Madrid
- 2008 Installation and VIP Room Contemporary Art Fair in Arco, Madrid
- 2007 Arta House, Mallorca
- 2006-2012 Masterplan for the integration of the railway in Logroño
- 2001-2006 Bioclimatic Towers in Wetland Salburúa. Vitoria Gasteiz
- 2004-2006 Pepe Cobo House, Mallorca, Spain.
- 2001-2005 Square and Tower Woermann, Las Palmas de Gran Canaria, Spain.
- 2000-2003 Gymnasium Pavilion in Parque del Retiro, Madrid, Spain.
- 1998-2000 Luis Gordillo Studio, Villanueva de la Cañada, Spain.
- 1995-2003 Usera Public Library, Madrid, Spain.
- 1994-1996 Luis Gordillo House, Villanueva de la Cañada, Spain.
- 1988-1990 Sports, Simancas, Spain.

== Awards ==
- In 2013, the Project Madrid Center, designed by José María Domínguez Ezquiaga, Salvador Pérez Arroyo and Juan Herreros, was one of the fifteen winners in the XII Biennial of Spanish Architecture and Urbanism.
- "Architect of the World" by the Colegio de Arquitectos de Lima, 2012.
- In 2012, the Agora-Bogota International Convention Center in Bogota, the project received the award for Best Project Abroad within VI Prizes NAN Architecture and Construction 2012 (Spain). The project is the responsibility of Herreros own architect Daniel Bermudez Colombia no. [4]
- Award 2012 European Urban and Regional Planning Awards. European Council of Spatial Planners. (Madrid Project Center).
- COAM Award 2011. (Project Madrid Centro)
- Construmat Award 2011. (House Garoza).
- 2009 International Fellowship Award, Royal Institute of British Architects, RIBA, UK.
- Medal of Fine Arts of the City of San Lorenzo del Escorial, 2009.
- COAM Award 2002 2000 (Gordillo Studio).
- 2001 COAM Architecture Award 1999 (recycling plant Valdemingómez municipal waste).
- Grupo Dragados XIV 2001 Architecture Prize CEOE Foundation (Waste Recycling Plant Urban Madrid).
- 2000 Madrid City Council Award for Architecture (Recycling Plant The Pastures).
- Barcelona City Council Award 1999 (Fabrications).
- 1997 Prize Community of Madrid (52 Homes in the M-30).
- 1997 Prize Community of Madrid (Gordillo House).
- COAM Architecture Award 1997 (House Gordillo).
- COAM Architecture Award 1991 (Office for Renfe).
- 1991 Madrid City Council Prize of Architecture and Urbanism (Offices for Renfe).
- 1988 Madrid City Council Prize of Architecture and Urbanism (Exhibition Le Corbusier. Skyscraper).
