= Filip Ćustić =

Spanish-Croatian artist

- Born: Filip Ćustić Braut; 31 March 1993 (age 32); Santa Cruz de Tenerife, Spain
- Occupation: Artist
- Website: filipcustic.com

Filip Ćustić Braut (Croatian pronunciation: [fǐlip tɕǔːstitɕ brǎut]; born 31 March 1993) is a Spanish-Croatian artist based in Madrid, Spain. Ćustić's artistic practice combines photography, performance art, sculpture and video art. The artistic pseudonym of the artist takes the initial letter of the surname and the name in lowercase: filip custic.

== Life and work ==
Ćustić was born in Santa Cruz de Tenerife to Croatian parents from Kornić who fled to Spain during the Croatian War of Independence.

Ćustić is a multidisciplinary artist whose work has been exhibited in Spain in places such as La Térmica in Málaga and La Fundación César Manrique in Lanzarote and, internationally, places such as the Museum der bildenden Künste in Leipzig and the Manchester International Festival. His work explores the impact of digital technologies on human conscience and sense of identity. Ćustić creates cuadros virtuales (virtual paintings), in which he oscillates between the real and the surreal.

Ćustić has also participated in numerous cultural projects in the art world. In January 2018, he was part of the second edition of Inspíreme that took place in Espacio Cultural CajaCanarias on Tenerife. At the beginning of 2019, he was selected as one of the artists that would be part of Selfridges' London art project The New Order that was launched in September 2019. In May 2019, he gave a keynote talk in the V edition of Design Fest, organized by IED Madrid. In July 2019, he was a member of the jury of Versiona Thyssen 2019 artistic open call, organized by Thyssen-Bornemisza Museum of Madrid. In 2023 was selected for Aesthetica Magazine's Artistic Directory.

Ćustić has also worked as an art creative and fashion photographer for Opening Ceremony, Vogue, Fucking Young!, GQ UK, Esquire, Visionare, Palomo Spain, and others. He collaborated with singer and songwriter Rosalía on her 2018 sophomore studio album El mal querer, designing and creating the visual identity for the album.

== Exhibitions ==
=== Solo exhibitions ===
- human product, PARCO Museum, coproduced with Colección SOLO.Tokio (2023)
- micro=macro, performance for Manchester International Festival, Selfridges, Manchester (2019)
- Filip Ćustić en Conversación con César Manrique, curated by Belinda Martín Porras, Fundación César Manrique, Lanzarote (2019)
- Homo-?, curated by Belinda Martín Porras, La Térmica, Málaga (2019)
- Presente Mental, curated by Xurxo Ponce, Centro Cultural de España, Montevideo (2019)
- Laberinto de espejos, performance in Absolut Manifesto 19 – We Are A New World, Madrid (2019)
- Objetismo Materializado - The Gathering, Caixa Forum Barcelona (2017)
- Patafísica: Suspensión, Fragmentación, James Fuentes Gallery, New York (2017)
- Mueble sexual, Soho House Barcelona (2017)
- surrealismo, abstracción 1, IKB 191, Madrid (2016)

=== Group exhibitions ===
- Certeza. Espacio SOLO, Colección SOLO Museum, Madrid (2022)
- crno-bijelo, Organ Vida Festival, Museum of Contemporary Art, Zagreb (2020)
- 10 segundos, 20 artistas, produced by Finding Art Madrid, Urvanity Art Fair, Madrid (2020)
- Link in Bio. Art after Social Media, curated by Anika Meier, Museum der bildenden Künste, Leipzig (2019)
- THE SEARCH FOR (MODERN) PLEASURE, Mira Festival, Barcelona (2018)
- Les Rencontres d’Arles, Arles (2018)
- PHotoEspaña 2018, Madrid (2018).
- The Gathering. La Noche Warhol, Caixa Forum Madrid (2018)
- Pink. A Rosé Exhibition, Colette, Paris (2016)

== Awards ==
- 2019 Latin Grammy for Best Recording Package for El mal querer by Rosalía
