= De Plata =

2017 song by Rosalía

Single by Rosalía

from the album Los Ángeles
- Language: Spanish
- Released: 26 May 2017
- Studio: Estudios Calamar (Barcelona)
- Genre: New flamenco; alternative R&B
- Length: 4:28
- Label: Universal Spain
- Lyricists: Manuel Ortega Juárez; Melchor Jiménez Torres; Manuel Infante
- Producer: Raül Refree

Rosalía singles chronology
"Catalina" (2016)	"De Plata" (2017)	"Aunque Es De Noche" (2017)

Music video
- "De Plata" on YouTube

"De Plata" is a song by Spanish singer Rosalía. It was released on 26 May 2017 by Universal Spain as the second single from her debut studio album, Los Ángeles (2017), with production and arrangements by Raül Refree. A music video for the single was released and was directed by Canada. The song is a reimagined work of "Cuando Yo Me Muera", performed by Manolo Caracol and Melchor de Marchena, and "El Querer Que Yo Te Tengo", performed by Manolo Frenegal. However, as the authors' rights of both works have expired, the lyricism of "De Plata" is considered of public domain. It is a new flamenco song in the form of a seguidilla, with aggressive guitar chords and elements of alternative R&B.

Critical reception from music outlets towards "De Plata" was generally positive, with reviewers branding as one of the best songs on the album. However, flamenco specialists were quite critical about the song and the album overall for its "decontextualized flamenco etiquette". Rosalía performed the song live first at her 2017–2018 concert tour, the Los Ángeles Tour, and revisited it for the Motomami World Tour (2022), where she sang it with twenty-meter-long black skirt wrapping her waist during a revamped electric guitar-driven performance.

== Composition ==
"De Plata" is a seguidilla song with new flamenco and alternative R&B elements that runs for four minutes and twenty-eight seconds. It is the fifth longest song on Los Ángeles and one of the longest in her discography. During the song Rosalía talks about death with aggressive guitar chords from Refree.

Following the concept of the album, the lyrics consist of re-versions of the work of a series of cantes by various cantaores. The verses of this song are composed of "Cuando Yo Me Muera", performed by Manolo Caracol and Melchor de Marchena, and "El Querer Que Yo Te Tengo", performed by Manolo Frenegal. "De Plata" was recorded at Estudios Calamar, in Barcelona, in 2016.

== Music video ==
Spanish filmmaking collective Manson directed the music video for "De Plata", which features the singer performing the track as she walks and dances in the streets of Los Angeles, California. It was published in Rosalía's YouTube channel on 26 May 2017. Luis Troquel of Rockdelux felt that the clip showed a "facet of Rosalía that was unknown to many", as she dances "with a glowing enchantment and exuberant style." Manson shot the clip in 16 mm film, as they "wanted to portray Rosalía as a classic Hollywood star, but with a contemporary sensibility." The collective told Nowness that they chose the song because it had a "Tarantino-esque vibe" that they thought matched Los Angeles. They further explained: "Her art is very pure and wild and we wanted a video to match—no camera tricks, no VFX, no ornaments, no Tumblr aesthetics, just the pure and raw performance of a new-born classic star."

== Live performances ==
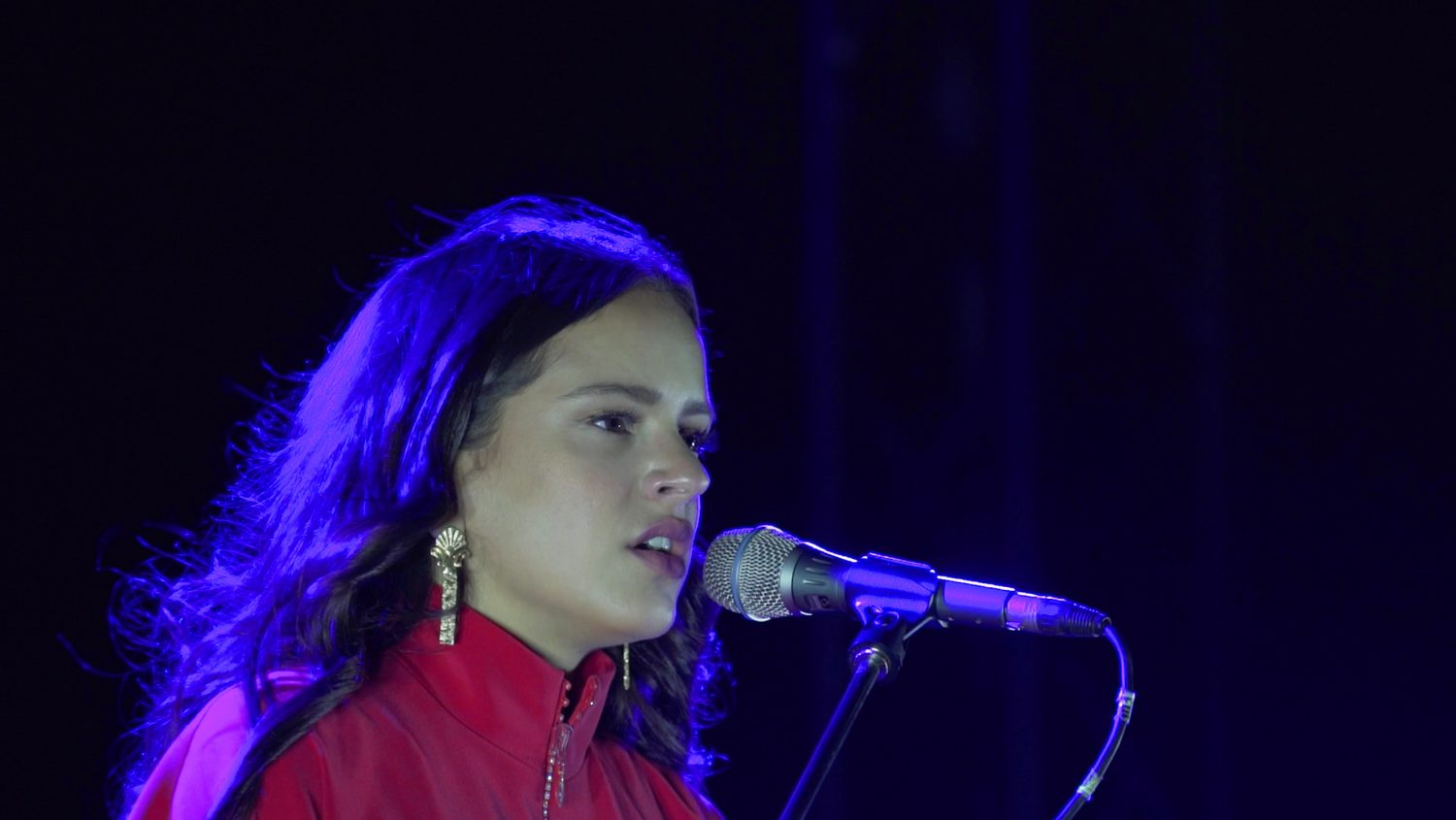
Rosalía performing "De Plata" during the Los Ángeles Tour.

Rosalía first performed "De Plata" at the first concert of her debut tour Los Ángeles Tour, in Granada. The performance (and the tour as a whole) only featured the singer, and Refree playing an acoustic guitar, a performance manner that critics described as "nude veracity". She performed it until the end of the tour on 14 April 2018 in Ibi, Alicante.

For the Motomami World Tour (2022), Rosalía performed "De Plata" at the end of the second set, after covering "Perdóname" by La Factoría and Eddy Lover. Her dancers wrap a twenty-meter long black skirt around her and give her a standing microphone. A camera operator shows the public a close up look of Rosalía as she performs a revamped, electric guitar-driven version of the song. Chal Ravens wrote for The Guardian that "such static moments bring out the extremes of her extraordinary voice. There’s the fluttery soprano with its mohair scratch, gliding through upper registers like another pop icon, Mariah Carey. But lurking beneath is a melismatic wail, scalding as hot metal and moulded by her training at the Catalonia College of Music."

"De Plata" was also performed during the Louis Vuitton Men's Fall-Winter 2023 Fashion Show in Paris, during the city's Fashion Week.

== Credits and personnel ==
Credits adapted from the liner notes of Los Ángeles.

Publishing

- Published by Songs of Universal, Inc, a subdivision of Universal Music Spain, SL.
- Recorded and mixed by Raül Refree at Estudios Calamar, Barcelona, Spain.
- Mastered by Àlex Psaroudakis at Sterling Sound, Edgewater, New Jersey.

Production personnel

- Rosalía Vila – vocals, background vocals, vocal arrangement.
- Raül Refree – production, composition, arrangement; guitar

Technical personnel

- Raül Refree – mixing
- Àlex Psaroudakis – mastering

=== Music video ===
- Canada – production company
- Manson – director
- Óscar Romagosa – executive producer
- Alba Barneda – head of production
- Karen Saurí – producer
- Pilar Vila – stylist
- Estel Román – editor
- Marga Sardá – line producer
