= Rosalía =

Spanish singer-songwriter (born 1992)

- Rosalía at the 2026 Latin Grammy Awards
- Born: Rosalia Vila Tobella; 25 September 1992 (age 34); Sant Cugat del Vallès, Catalonia, Spain
- Education: Catalonia College of Music
- Occupations: Singer-songwriter; actress; record producer
- Years active: 2013–present
- Works: Discography; live performances
- Awards: Full list
- Musical career
- Origin: Sant Esteve Sesrovires, Catalonia, Spain
- Genres: Flamenco pop; urbano; art pop; folk; alternative
- Instruments: Vocals
- Labels: Columbia; Universal Spain
- Website: rosalia.com (in Spanish and English)

Rosalía Vila Tobella (born 25 September 1992), known mononymously as Rosalía (Spanish: [rosaˈli.a]), is a Spanish singer-songwriter and actress. She has been described as an "atypical pop star" due to her genre-bending musical style. After being enthralled by Spanish folk music at age 14, she studied musicology at the Catalonia College of Music and graduated in 2017.

She completed her studies with honours by virtue of her debut and collaborative cover album with Raül Refree, Los Ángeles (2017), and her baccalaureate second album El mal querer (2018). Reimagining flamenco by mixing it with pop and hip-hop music, it spawned the singles "Malamente" and "Pienso en tu mirá", which caught the attention of the Spanish public, and were released to critical acclaim. A recipient of the Latin Grammy Award for Album of the Year and listed in Rolling Stone's 500 Greatest Albums of All Time, El mal querer started the ascent of Rosalía into the international music scene. Rosalía explored urbano music with her 2019 releases "Con altura" and "Yo x ti, tú x mí", achieving global success. She gave reggaeton an experimental twist on her third studio album Motomami (2022), departing from the new flamenco sound of its predecessor. The album caught international attention with its singles "La Fama", "Saoko", and "Despechá", to become the best reviewed album of the year on Metacritic. Her fourth album Lux (2025) broke several all-time records by a Spanish-speaking female artist and was widely acclaimed by critics for its ambitious fusion of art pop and classical elements.

In the course of her career, Rosalía has accumulated thirteen number-ones in her home country, the most for a local female artist. She has also won two Grammy Awards, sixteen Latin Grammy Awards (including three Album of the Year and one Song of the Year wins), a BRIT Award, four MTV Video Music Awards, two MTV Europe Music Awards, three UK Music Video Awards, an Ivor Novello Award and two Premio Ruido awards, among others. In 2019, Billboard gave her the Rising Star Award for "changing the sound of today's mainstream music with her fresh flamenco-influenced pop", and became the first Spanish-singing act in history to be nominated for Best New Artist at the Grammys. In 2026, Rosalía was named Woman of the Year at the Billboard Latin Women in Music and inducted into the Billboard Latin Music Hall of Fame. She is widely considered one of the most successful and influential Spanish singers of all time.

== Life and career ==
=== 1992–2016: Early life and career beginnings ===
Rosalía Vila Tobella was born in 1992 at a hospital in Sant Cugat del Vallès, Catalonia, Spain, although she was raised in Sant Esteve Sesrovires, Baix Llobregat. Born to a family with no musical background, she was named after her maternal grandmother Rosalía Aguilera Torres, who was born in Òdena. She is the youngest daughter of María Pilar Tobella Aguilera, who runs Suprametal, SA, a family company specialising in metalworks for windows. Her father, José Manuel Vila, was born in Cudillero, Asturias, to a Galician father from Vigo and a mother from Ávila, with one of his grandfathers being born in Cuba. Her parents separated in 2019. Rosalía has an older sister, Pilar "Pili" Vila (born 1989), who works with her as her stylist and creative director.

Rosalía expressed interest in the performing arts at an early age, especially after discovering the discography of Camarón de la Isla. She began her musical education at the Taller de Músics., where she completed a six-year course. She then began attending class at the Raval school, later transferring to the Superior School of Music of Catalonia. She graduated in 2017. During this time, she also worked as an independent singer at weddings and musical bars, for which she was paid "a little over 80 euros or in exchange for dinner". During that time, Rosalía met many underground Spanish artists who would later become successful, such as La Zowi, Yung Beef, Kaydy Cain, Hinds and María Escarmiento.

At 15, she competed on the television show Tú Sí Que Vales, although she was not selected. At 17, she had to undergo vocal cord surgery after tearing one of her vocal cords due to "intense singing practices" and was unable to sing for a year. In 2012, she became the vocalist of Kejaleo, a flamenco music group featuring Jordi Franco, Roger Blavia, Cristo Fontecilla, Diego Cortés and Xavi Turull. They released an album, Alaire, in 2013. That same year, Rosalía professionally worked as a duo with Juan "Chicuelo" Gómez to promote the Blancanieves soundtrack at the 2013 Panama International Film Festival in substitution of Sílvia Pérez Cruz and at the Festival Grec de Barcelona for the contemporary dance work De Carmen. In 2013, she participated in the Association of Performing Arts Professionals (APAP) Conference in New York, and was the lead voice in the culmination of the Any Espriu 2014. In 2015, she collaborated with La Fura dels Baus on a show that premiered in Singapore. She was the opening act for flamenco artist Miguel Poveda, accompanied by Alfredo Lagos, at the International Music Festival of Cadaqués, and also at the 2016 Jerez Jazz Festival. She worked with Rocío Márquez on the presentation of her album El Niño, produced by Raül Refree, at Primavera Sound. In 2015, she also worked with clothing brand Desigual and sang the single for their campaign jingle "Last Night Was Eternal". and self-released "Un Millón de Veces" included in the benefit album Tres Guitarras Para el Autismo. At 20, she worked as a flamenco teacher and vocal coach. In 2016, Rosalía collaborated with Spanish rapper and former boyfriend C. Tangana on "Antes de morirme". The song was a sleeper hit and entered the Spanish Singles Chart in 2018, after the success of Rosalía's newer material. The collaboration received international attention when it was featured on the soundtrack of the first season of the Spanish Netflix show Élite.

=== 2016–2017: Los Ángeles ===
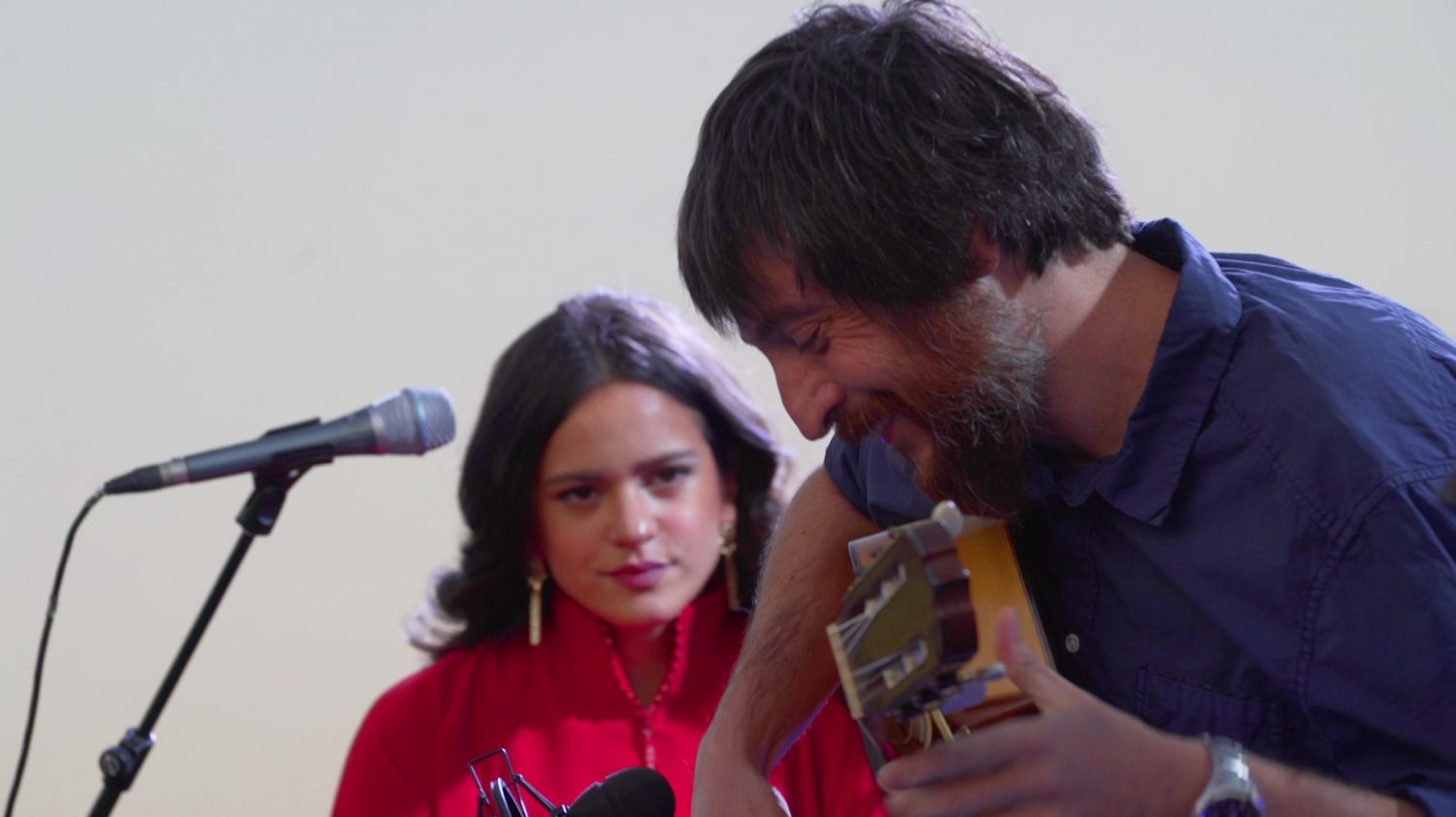
Rosalía and Raül Refree during Los Ángeles Tour in July 2017

In 2016, Rosalía performed to a crowd of a hundred people at the Tablao del Carmen, a flamenco specialised venue at the Pueblo Español, in Barcelona. In the audience was Raül Refree, whom she invited to the show. They began working on two albums together. Rosalía signed with Universal Music later in 2016, and she relocated to California. She went on to only release Los Ángeles. The album talks about death in a dark way with aggressive guitar chords by Refree. It presents reworks of flamenco classics receiving several accolades. She was nominated for Best New Artist at the 18th Latin Grammy Awards. The album was released on 10 February 2017 through Universal Music and spawned two singles, "Catalina", released in October 2016, and "De Plata", released in May 2017. The album was very well received by critics. Jordi Bardají wrote in 2018 that the record was "one of the greatest 'sleepers' that Spanish sales lists have known in recent times." Los Ángeles reached its peak position of number nine on 11 November 2018 and has remained in the albums chart since its entry, having accumulated a total of 89 weeks. Los Ángeles won the "Album of the Year" award at the Time Out Awards and the Premio Ruido, among others. In 2017, RTVE contacted Rosalía to participate in the pre-selection to represent Spain in the Eurovision Song Contest 2017, which she declined because of scheduling conflicts with the promotion of her debut record.

Rosalía and Raül Refree embarked on a concert tour, Los Ángeles Tour, supporting their first studio album together. The tour began on 11 February 2017 in Granada and ended on 1 March 2018 at the Palau de la Música in Barcelona. Spanish singer Bebe attended one of their concerts in Madrid alongside Juanes, who became "immediately obsessed with Rosalía" and asked his manager Rebeca León to work with her. She agreed to manage her as she felt like she was a "once in fifty years kind of artist".

=== 2018–2020: El mal querer and international recognition ===
The recording cycle for Rosalía's second studio album, El mal querer, began in early 2017 as her baccalaureate project, graduating from the Catalonia College of Music. She personally chose to work alongside Spanish musician el Guincho and spawned its concept alongside friend Ferran Echegaray, who bet on the Romance of Flamenca to follow the album's storyline. Despite having no budget to produce the record as she was an independent artist working on a university project, Rosalía invested a lot of her own money, to the point of "almost going bankrupt". The album was almost completely recorded at el Guincho's apartment in Barcelona with a computer, a microphone and a sound card. It would mix traditional flamenco with today's pop and urban music.

In May 2018, the singer announced the title of her upcoming album in a little homemade YouTube series. J Balvin parallelly released his fifth studio album, Vibras, which featured Rosalía on the track "Brillo". Later that month, Rosalía released the album's lead single "Malamente". The single caught the attention of international personalities such as Kourtney Kardashian and Dua Lipa, alongside numerous music critics, while its Canada-directed music video reached social media virality. The song was nominated for five Latin Grammy Awards, out of it won two, for Best Alternative Song and for Best Urban Fusion/Performance. The follow-up single, "Pienso en tu mirá", was released in July. Its music video received critical acclaim for its aesthetics and poetic symbolism. The song was nominated for Best Pop Song at the 2019 Latin Grammy Awards. The third single, "Di mi nombre", released three days prior to the album, earned Rosalía her first number-one single in Spain.

El mal querer was released on 2 November 2018 and debuted at number two on the PROMUSICAE chart. Presented as experimental and conceptual, it revolves around a toxic relationship described in the anonymous 13th-century Occitan novel Flamenca. The album was met with universal acclaim by music critics. Writing for The Guardian, head critic Alexis Petridis highly commended the album, giving it the highest rating and describing it as "the calling card of a unique new talent". El mal querer was listed in over twenty album year-end and decade-end lists by publications such as Pitchfork, Billboard and The Guardian. Rolling Stone listed it 315th on their 500 Greatest Albums of All Time list, making it the highest Spanish-language album in the list. El mal querer was later nominated for several awards including four Latin Grammys, a Latin Billboard Music award, a Latin American Music award and a LOS40 Music award. It also won the Grammy Award for Best Latin Rock, Urban or Alternative Album.

In 2019 Rosalía took part in the Pedro Almodóvar film Pain and Glory. She had previously contributed vocals to the soundtracks of Arde Madrid and Paquita Salas. In March 2019, Rosalía embarked on her first global concert tour, El Mal Querer Tour, to further promote El Mal Querer, with shows in South America, North America, Europe and Africa.

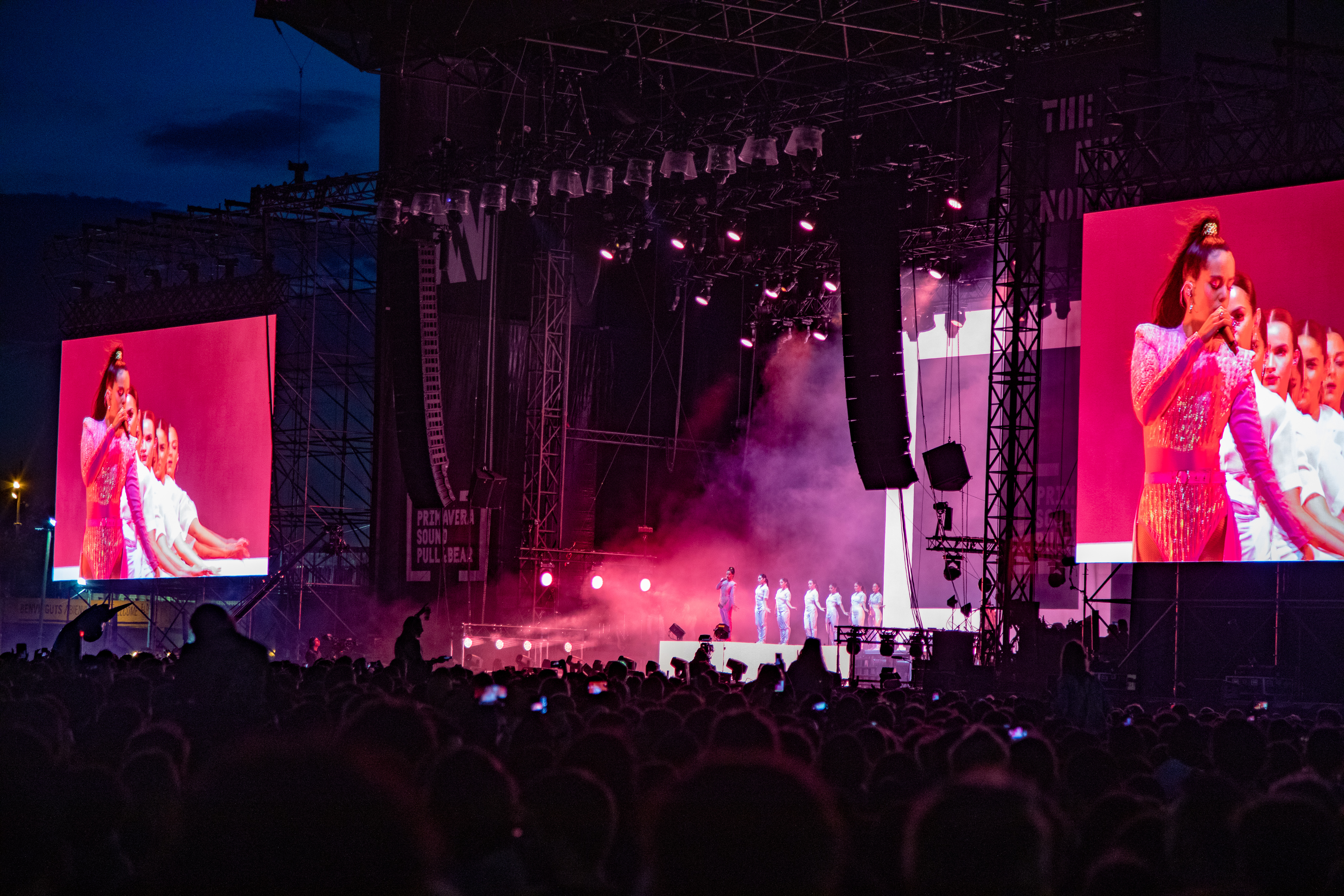
Rosalía performing at Primavera Sound in 2019 during El Mal Querer Tour

While on tour, Rosalía issued several songs. On 28 March 2019, she released a second collaboration with Balvin, "Con altura". Despite initially receiving mixed reviews from critics, "Con altura" topped the charts in Argentina, Colombia, the Dominican Republic, Mexico, Venezuela and Spain. Its music video, directed by Director X, became the most-watched music video by a female artist of 2019. It also spawned her nickname "La Rosalía" and its choreography eventually became viral and a moment in Latin pop culture. "Con altura" won two MTV Video Music Awards for Best Latin Video and Best Choreography, making her the first Spanish act to win one. It also won Best Collaboration at the 2019 MTV Europe Music Awards and Best Urban Song at the 2019 Latin Grammys. The song has sold over seven million copies worldwide so far.

In May, Rosalía released the song "Aute Cuture". It became her third number-one in Spain and earned a Latin Grammy nomination for Record of the Year. In July, she released the single Fucking Money Man, which includes two tracks: "Milionària" (which she sang in Catalan) and "Dios nos libre del dinero". On 15 August, she released her collaboration with Ozuna "Yo x ti, tú x mí", which became her fifth number one single in Spain. In November, Rosalía released "A Palé", which features background vocals by James Blake, who she had worked earlier with on "Barefoot in the Park". In December, Rosalía was featured alongside Lil Baby on the remix of Travis Scott's "Highest in the Room". She was awarded the Rising Star award at Billboard's Women in Music for the international recognition she achieved during the year and for "changing the sound of today's mainstream music with her fresh flamenco-influenced pop". Rosalía's performance of "Juro Que" at the 62nd Grammy Awards marked the first time a Spanish female artist performed at the gala. She also became the first Spanish-singing act in history to be nominated for Best New Artist. During lockdown, Rosalía released "Dolerme" and, in May, "TKN", her second collaboration with Travis Scott, which eventually became her first entry on the Billboard Hot 100, debuting at number 66, as well as the sixth number-one single of hers in her home country. The song went viral on TikTok. The music video for "TKN", directed by Nicolás Méndez, won the Latin Grammy Award for Best Short Form Music Video. It also spawned a nomination for Best Direction at the Berlin Music Video Awards. On 22 June, Arca and Rosalía released their highly anticipated collaboration "KLK", included in the musician's album KiCk i.

=== 2020–2023: Collaborations and Motomami ===
Recording sessions for Rosalía's third studio album started as early as 2019. Due to the COVID-19 pandemic, Rosalía relocated to Miami where she continued to work on the album while also providing vocals to multiple songs. On 4 September 2020, a remix of Sech's "Relación", which also features Daddy Yankee, Farruko and J Balvin, was released, earning Rosalía her second entry on the Billboard Hot 100, peaking at 64. She also took part in Bad Bunny's third solo studio album, El Último Tour del Mundo, on the track "La Noche de Anoche", which was later released as a single on Valentine's Day. The collaboration, performed on Saturday Night Live, became a huge commercial success, debuting at number two on the Spotify global chart with 6.63 million streams in a single day, marking the biggest debut for a song fully sung in Spanish in history. A week later, she collaborated alongside the Weeknd on the remix of "Blinding Lights" and, in January, with Billie Eilish on "Lo Vas a Olvidar", which was featured in the Euphoria special episode "Fuck Anyone Who's Not a Sea Blob". Rosalía later collaborated with Oneohtrix Point Never and Tokischa on "Nothing's Special" and "Linda" respectively.

On 2 November 2021, Rosalía announced the title of her new album Motomami. It was released on 18 March 2022 through Columbia Records. Promotion prior to the album release encompassed the release of three singles and the promotional singles "Hentai" and "Candy". The lead single "La Fama", featuring the Weeknd, is an experimental bachata that saw great commercial success. It became Rosalía's seventh number one single in Spain while also peaking at five in France and reaching the top ten spot in eight other countries. In December 2021, Rockstar Games launched a new Grand Theft Auto Online radio station, Motomami Los Santos, curated by Rosalía and Arca. In February 2022, Rosalía revealed the album artwork for Motomami and released "Saoko" as the album's second single to wide critical acclaim. The song's accompanying music video, directed by Valentin Petit, was shot in Kyiv, mainly at Podilskyi Bridge. For its editing done by Petit and Jon Echeveste, the video would go on to win the MTV Video Music Award for Best Editing. On 24 February, Rosalía released "Chicken Teriyaki" as the album's third single.

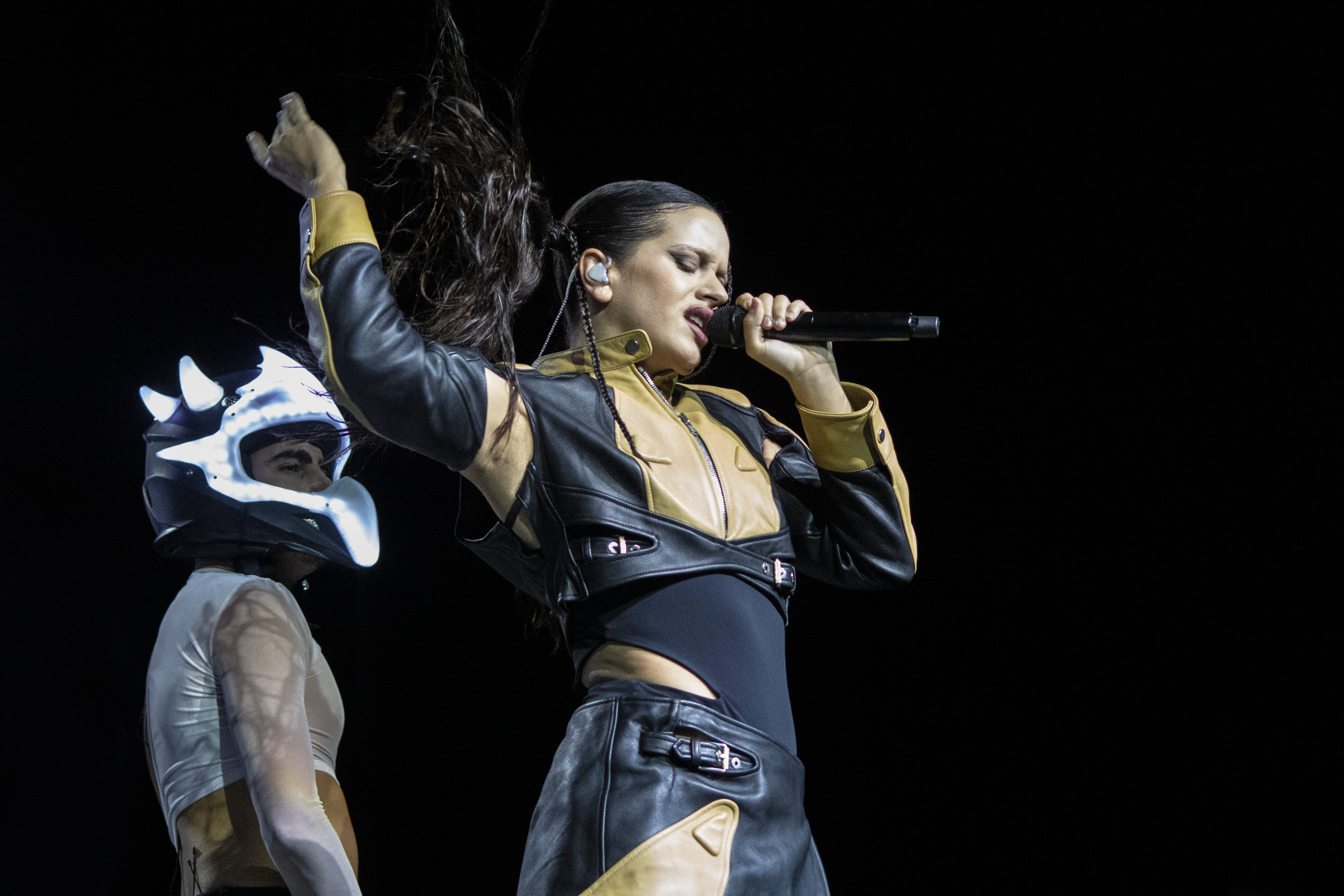
Rosalía performing on her Motomami World Tour

Upon release, Motomami received universal acclaim from music critics, many of whom praised the experimentation and genre-bending sounds. Motomami received a perfect score from various publications, including The Telegraph, The Independent and Variety and was given four stars or more by Clash, Rolling Stone, Rockdelux, The Guardian etc. Pitchfork crowned Motomami with its "Best New Music" honour writing, "It feels rare to hear an album that's so experimental, that aspires to stretch itself out across genres and play with form, and that attains exactly what it sets out to achieve. Rosalía was already a formidable singer, but here she also sounds like she learned that with global superstardom comes the freedom to set her own agenda". The album has become the best reviewed and most discussed album of 2022 on Metacritic. Commercially, Motomami entered twenty-two charts in nineteen countries and reached the top ten in seven countries, two of them number-ones. The album entered major market charts, reaching the top forty in both on the UK Albums Chart and the Billboard 200. On Spotify, it achieved the biggest debut for a Spanish-language album by a female artist on the platform's history, with 16.3 million streams in the first day.

In July 2022, Rosalía embarked on her second worldwide concert tour, Motomami World Tour, to further promote Motomami, with shows in Europe, South America and North America. The setlist featured four unreleased tracks including "Despechá", which was later released on 28 July to global success. Rosalía later took part in the forthcoming projects by Romeo Santos, Niño de Elche, and Wisin & Yandel.

At the 23rd Annual Latin Grammy Awards, Motomami won the four categories in which it was nominated in, which were Album of the Year, Best Alternative Music Album, Best Engineered Album and Best Recording Package. Rosalía was the first woman and sixth act overall to win Album of the Year twice as a lead artist. She also received two nominations at the 65th Annual Grammy Awards for Best Latin Rock or Alternative Album and Best Music Film for Motomami TikTok Live, winning for the former category. However, media such as Rolling Stone, Pitchfork, the New York Times and W believed that the Recording Academy and the Grammys had snubbed Motomami for the Album of the Year category.

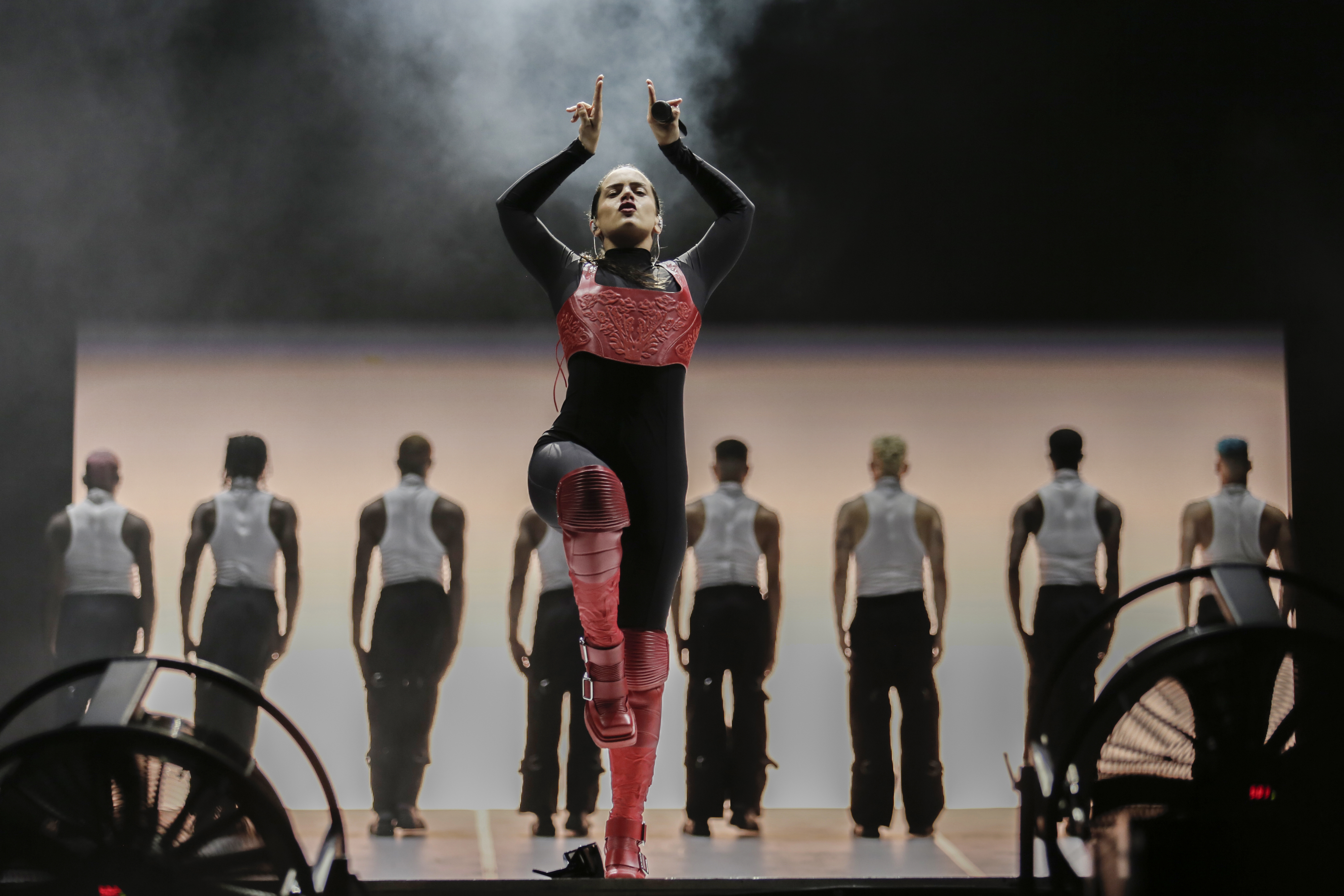
Rosalía and her dance troupe performing at Mexico City's Zócalo on 28 April 2023

At the start of 2023, Rosalía collaborated with Coca-Cola to create a limited edition flavour under its "Coca-Cola Creations" brand called "Move", for which she released the song "LLYLM". In March, the singer embarked on a festival run off her Motomami tour, which visited a great variety of festivals through 21 dates, including Coachella, Lollapalooza and Primavera Sound. On 24 March, she released RR, a collaborative EP with her then boyfriend, singer Rauw Alejandro, and released the single "Beso" to global success. On 28 April, Rosalía performed at a free concert organised by the Secretariat of Culture in the Zócalo of Mexico City, which had more than 160,000 attendees. According to a press statement, Rosalía performed in front of nearly 2 million people worldwide and visited 21 countries across three continents.

In September 2023, Rosalía temporarily signed with Jaime Levine, Shakira's former manager, after departing ways with Rebeca León. A charity single alongside Björk titled "Oral" was released on 21 November 2023.

=== 2024–present: Lux ===
On 16 August 2024, Rosalía was featured on Thai rapper Lisa's single "New Woman". The song debuted at number 15 on the Billboard Global 200 and at number six on the Billboard Global Excl. US, becoming Lisa's fourth top-ten hit on the latter chart. It also debuted at number 97 on the US Billboard Hot 100. On 24 September 2024, Rosalía curated the soundtrack for the annual musical firework show done in Barcelona during La Mercè, where she premiered her new single "Omega", featuring Ralphie Choo. It was officially released the following day.

In early 2025, Rosalía was cast in the third and final season of the American drama television series Euphoria. In Euphoria, she portrayed Magick, a stripper employed by Alamo at the Silver Slipper, one of Alamo's strip clubs, wearing a neck brace in an attempt to win a lawsuit and is suspicious of main character Rue Bennett. The season premiered in April 2026, and Rosalía was featured in six out of its eight total episodes.

In June 2025, Hits magazine reported that Rosalía had signed with Jonathan Dickins' September Management and that her next album was expected before the end of the year, to be followed by an arena tour in 2026. She started teasing her new project in the following months.

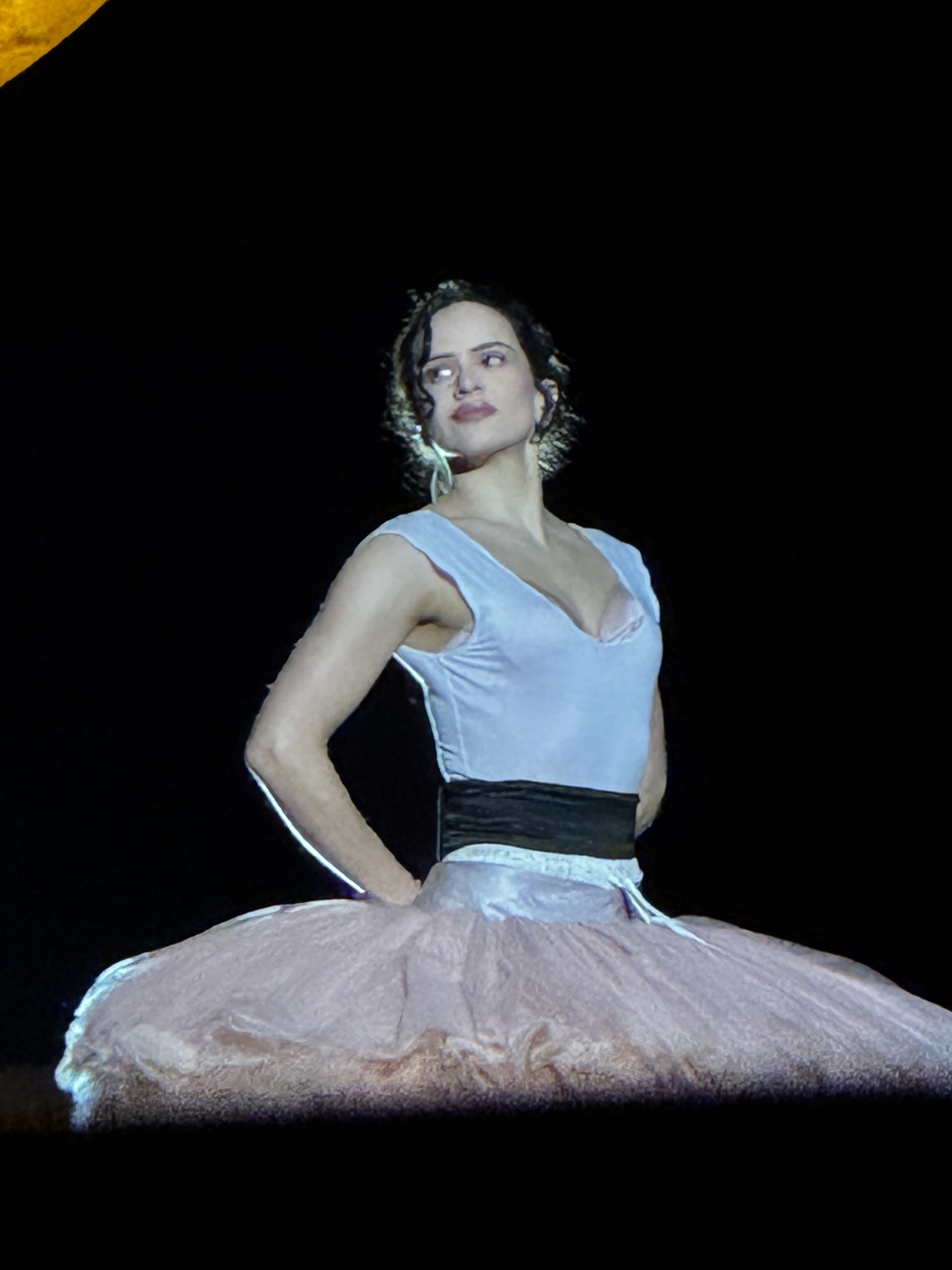
Rosalía performing on her Lux Tour

Lux, Rosalía's fourth studio album, was announced on 20 October 2025. She released its lead single, "Berghain", on 27 October and it topped the charts in her home country of Spain. The album was released on 7 November 2025, becoming her first to debut in the top ten of the Billboard 200 and UK Albums Chart as well as breaking the all-time record for most streamed album in a single day by a Spanish-speaking female artist. The track "La Perla" was initially released as a part of the album rather than a single but proved popular in European markets and debuted at the top of the chart in Spain, replacing "Berghain" to become Rosalía's thirteenth number-one. "La Perla" was sent to Italian radio as the album's second single on 5 December 2025. The digital release of Lux contains 15 tracks, while the physical edition contains 18. Musically, Lux was another example of Rosalía's skill of genre fusion that blended elements of art pop and classical and the album was praised by critics for its ambitious concept based around various female Saints which addressed themes of "feminine mystique, transformation and spirituality" in a total of fourteen languages. The Independent described the album as a "masterpiece ruminating on mortality, lust, sainthood and idolatry - with a self-portrait underneath". Lux has been the highest rated album of 2025, alongside Bad Bunny's Debí Tirar Más Fotos.

In March 2026, Rosalía embarked on the Lux Tour, to further promote Lux, with shows in Europe, South America and North America. On March 25, 2026, during the Lux world tour, Rosalía had to cut short her concert at the Unipol Forum in Milan, the only date in Italy, due to food poisoning. She left the stage after performing about eleven songs and apologized to the audience. At the Brit Awards 2026, Rosalía delivered a standout performance of "Berghain" with Bjork and became the first Spanish-speaking winner, receiving the award for International Artist of the Year and also won International Songwriter of the Year at the prestigious Ivor Novello Awards later in May. On September 17, 2026, it was revealed that Rosalía would be featured on the track "Where is Gone?" from the upcoming Fontaines D.C. album Dopamine Chamber. On October 10, 2026, Rosalía was a musical guest on Saturday Night Live, where she performed the tracks "Reliquia" and "Magnolias" from Lux. At the 2026 Billboard Latin Music Awards, Lux won Top Latin Pop Album of the Year and Rosalía was inducted into the Hall of Fame for an "extraordinary career defined by musical innovation, a singular artistic vision and an influence that has transcended genres, languages and borders" according to an official press release.

At the 27th Annual Latin Grammy Awards, Lux won six out of its eight nominations, including Album of the Year and Song of the Year, making Rosalía a three-time AOTY winner and extending her record as the most awarded female artist in the category's history.

== Artistry ==
=== Musical style and genres ===
Noted for the conceptuality and constant genre transformation of her albums and singles, Rosalía's music has evolved from folk to the mainstream and avant-pop. As Rosalía has a master's degree in flamenco interpretation, she started her professional career as a full flamenco singer. 2017 saw the release of her debut album Los Ángeles, a folk record in which Rosalía "is posited as the contemporary cantaora who has better understood the current times". The singer has, ever since, been described as "an old soul trapped in a young body" due to the maturity of the genre. After the release of "Malamente" in May 2018, which rose the singer's popularity to a national level, her music was described as a "heavily exciting fusion of flamenco and modern arts". American magazine Pitchfork called the singer's voice "a soft liquid velvet" and wrote that "Malamente consumes the listener with drums and soft synthesizers that drag you to their world completely". After releasing El mal querer later that year, The Guardian gave it a perfect score and stated: "the Catalan singer's potent, smart second album is more complex than any Latin pop currently in the charts". During the three-year droplet era that started with the 2019 release "Con altura", Rosalía's music evolved to a more mainstream urbano field without leaving the flamenco essence that characterises her artistry. Described by Rolling Stone as "one of the most daring and reckless productions of recent years", Rosalía's 2022 studio album Motomami "redefined mainstream" by taking reggaeton as its main influence and blending it with traditional music of Latin America as well as with other genres such as industrial or jazz. The singer has stated that she listens to a vast catalogue of music specially when she is making a record in the urge to learn about them. Rosalía has cited the 2011 eponymous album by James Blake as one of the most impactful records of her life.

Describing his experience of working with Rosalía on Motomami, producer Noah Goldstein said that "The first word that comes to mind to describe her is singular. I truly don't think there's anyone else out there doing what she's done. I think she's challenged everyone else in the music industry with the music she makes. She pushes herself so hard, and you can hear it in the music. She set a new bar for what pop music can be. She transcends barriers; she transcends language with her music". Rick Rubin noted of Rosalía that "She's always taking chances, we have seen Rosalía continue to follow her own instincts, and her audience continues to grow through the style changes. Her formula for success has been honest and true to herself. She is an artist, not a product".

In his El mal querer review, The Guardian's Alexis Petridis wrote: "She can really sing [...] but her voice is audibly rooted in a different musical tradition to the usual styles in which pop vocalists perform. The standard set of tricks (post-Whitney extemporisation overload, sub-Winehouse aged soul, please-compare-me-to-Kate-Bush kooky swooping, etc) are all noticeable by their absence. Instead, her voice is powerful and gutsily emotive: her melismas sound more Middle Eastern than Mariah Carey." With a naturally wide vocal range and accuracy, Rosalía also tends to use Auto-Tune for aesthetic effects in songs and live performances.

Rosalía has been accused of cultural appropriation by some Romani people because she adapts Romani customs into her style and draws from the flamenco music tradition, which is often thought to be from Romani people in Andalusia. However, the origin of flamenco music is not known precisely, and it probably fused musical practices from three sources: Moorish, Jewish and Romani cultures. Responding to this criticism, Rosalía said, "music is universal."

=== Influences ===
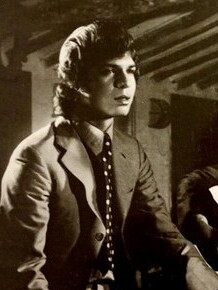
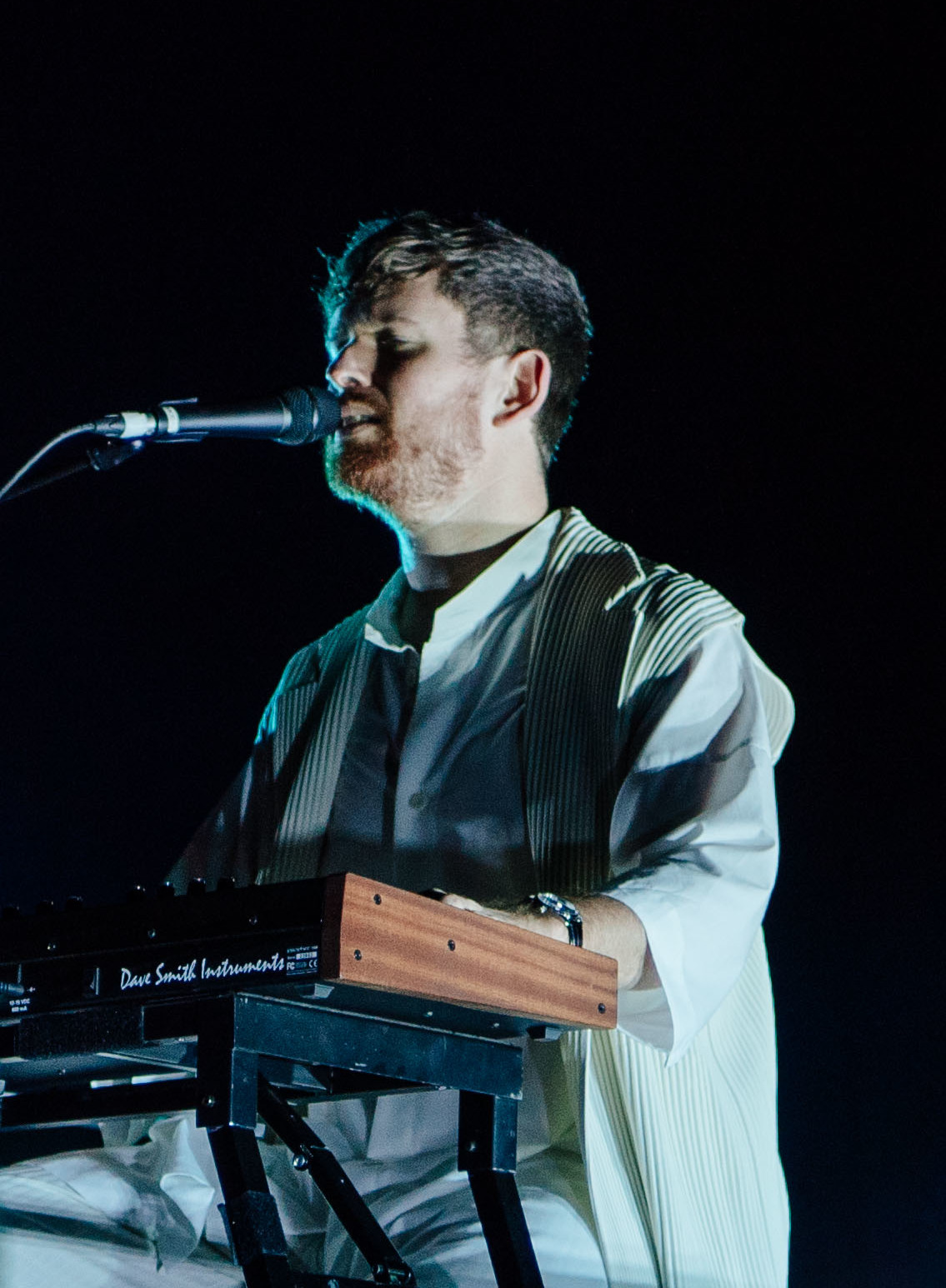
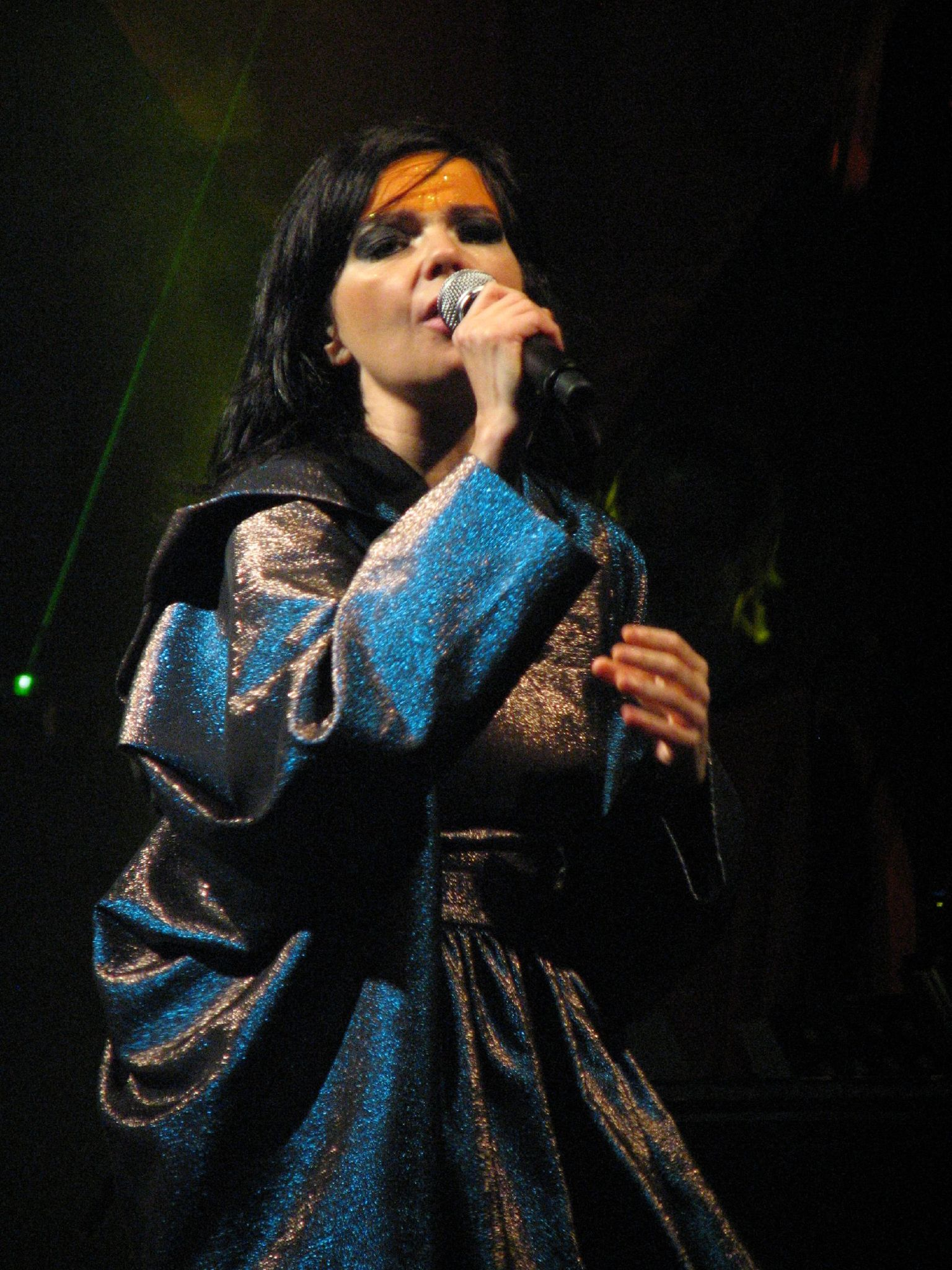
Rosalía has cited Camarón de la Isla (left), James Blake (center) and Björk (right) as her major musical influences. She has collaborated with Blake and Björk.

Rosalía has cited Camarón de la Isla, James Blake, and Björk as her major musical influences. In 2019 she told MTV "when I was 13 years old I started listening to him [Camarón de la Isla] by chance. This genre, flamenco, was what my high-school friends listened to and so did I. When I discovered him I was like 'oh my God!' I didn't think anyone was capable to sing with such a voice; it would go right through me so heartily. He was my introduction to flamenco. Thanks to him I discovered this vast universe within this music style which is almost endless and very exciting." Another flamenco influence of Rosalía is La Niña de los Peines. She states that despite not enjoying her recordings at first, she ended up appreciating her melodies and realised that she was a true pioneer since most flamenco singers were men at the time she became popular. She said: "flamenco is a masculine art form by tradition and there she was, with all her creativity as a woman. She became a professional at the time when it was very unusual".

About Björk, Rosalía told Pitchfork that she "thanks God for Björk's existence" and for "paving the way for female producers". When asked about James Blake's impact on her, she said: "I started listening to him when I was at university. His music has left a mark on me; not only the bold character of his production but also its minimalism and free structures. When I listen to him, I can feel that he allows himself a lot of freedom. I personally think that he doesn't do music to please nobody but only for himself." Rosalía collaborated with Blake on his song "Barefoot in the Park", which was released as the fourth single of his 2019 album Assume Form. She has also cited Madonna, Aventura, Beyoncé, Frank Ocean, Héctor Lavoe, Kate Bush, Nina Simone, Queen, Supertramp, Bob Dylan, Bob Marley, Janis Joplin, Kanye West, Rihanna, Lil' Kim, Lole y Manuel, M.I.A., Shakira, Tego Calderón, David Bowie, Pharrell Williams, and Lauryn Hill as direct musical inspirations.

The biggest fashion influence of Rosalía is Lola Flores. In an interview with Billboard she stated: "I love her. I love the attitude and the strength she had". She also mentioned Carmen Amaya; "she used to wear masculine clothes in a moment that any woman was dancing in typically-man clothing". Rosalía has become a regular fashion show attendee, expressing her love for Palomo Spain, Dion Lee, Martin Margiela, Dapper Dan, Pepa Salazar, Matthew Williams, Alexander Wang, Burberry, Dominnico, Dior, and Versace, among others. She has attended the Met Gala thrice, dressed in Rick Owens, Givenchy and Dior.

== Impact and achievements ==
Rosalía has been praised or mentioned as an influence by a number of artists including Christina Aguilera, Tate McRae, Lorde, Bono, Jihyo, Camila Cabello, Madonna, Lauren Jauregui, David Byrne, Charli XCX, Kelly Clarkson, Björk, Judeline, Julieta, Ralphie Choo, Guitarricadelafuente, and Maria Hein.

=== Spanish music industry ===
Forbes named Rosalía in their list of "Most Influential Spanish Women" in 2020 and in 2022. In 2021, Pitchfork named Rosalía one of the most important artists of the last 25 years. In 2023, Rosalía was listed among the 200 greatest singers of all time by Rolling Stone. Rosalía was named Woman of the Year at the 2026 Billboard Latin Women in Music awards and was inducted into the Billboard Latin Music Hall of Fame in the same year. The first Spanish singing act to be nominated for "Best New Artist" at the Grammys and the first to win a Brit Award, Rosalía is widely considered one of the most successful and influential Spanish singers in history.

=== Controversy on cultural appropriation ===
The popularisation of new flamenco nationally and worldwide has allowed new artists such as María José Llergo to reach a wider audience internationally. In 2020, The Atlantic stated that Rosalía had "turned the harrowing music of Andalusia into a global phenomenon." Rosalía has been credited with inspiring contemporary artists like Marina, Kacey Musgraves, and Christina Aguilera. The resurgence of flamenco music alongside Rosalía's work has led to discussions of cultural appropriation, sometimes dubbed "the Rosalía polemic". Rosalía has been accused of stealing the culture of the Spanish Romani people (Gitanos), who claim this artistic expression as their own, as it has been one of the few ways of free cultural expression Gitanos had available to them in the face of discrimination and persecution within wider society. Purists view flamenco performances by Catalans, non-Gitanos, or non-Andalusians, such as Rosalía, as unfair and illegitimate. Others have defended Rosalía, saying that, in a global interconnected world, where exposure to cultural traditions and art forms are widely accessed, Rosalía's success can inspire international appreciation of this art form and compare the situation to Madonna's use of Spanish traditions sparking international interest in Spanish culture and art.

The New York Times said in 2019: "The debate on the cultural appropriation of the Spanish singer is unfair: her music embodies, with height, the most eloquent artistic form of globalization: the remix". When asked about this topic, she responded: "I've realized that it is not that I am specifically being attacked, it is the situation where there are people who, like me, have been fortunate enough to be able to study music, which they have wanted. And having options that other people don't have", stating that this is more of a political issue and a matter of privileges. Following her win for Best Latin Video for "Con Altura" at the 2019 MTV Video Music Awards, Rosalía broached a related discussion, as to whether the expression "Latin" (derived from a Romance language, like Spanish) has been misunderstood and has evolved to the English interpretation of "Latino" (person from Latin American countries previously ruled by the Spanish and Portuguese empires), extending the debate about cultural appropriation and whether she should or should not be nominated in Latin categories at award shows. Rosalía also discussed the topic at the 2020 Latin Billboard Music Week, where Leila Cobo, host of VP Latin, stated: "Billboard categorizes music sung in the Spanish language as Latin music. You are a Spanish artist, not a Latin American but your music is called 'Latin' because it is sung in Spanish. It is also very interesting to see how this term is only used in the United States". Rosalía has also said that she feels "uncomfortable" when this term is used on her. Stemming from these debates, Rosalía has received both support and online criticism.

== Business and ventures ==
=== Products and endorsements ===
In November 2018, Rosalía released a limited fashion line in collaboration with Pull&Bear, inspired in the music video for "Malamente". A second limited edition line was released in May 2019. In September 2020, she launched a solitary lipstick collection with MAC Cosmetics, donating 100% of proceeds in support of women, youth and the LGBT community to a MAC-related fund. A second limited eye shadow collection with MAC was released a year later. After starring in an Air Max 2090 commercial, Rosalía teamed up with Nike in March 2021 to design espadrilles-like Air Force 1s, a folkloric compliment manifested in Catalan culture. These, however, were never commercialised. In 2022, Rosalía became a brand ambassador for Skims. In January 2023, she teamed up with Coca-Cola Creations to create a "transformation-flavored" Coke marketed as Move. She released the single "LLYLM" to promote the drink. Later in March she reimagined the interlude "Abcdefg", from her 2022 album Motomami, in a commercial for SEAT's Cupra brand. She became a Dior global ambassador in May 2024 and a Calvin Klein and New Balance global ambassador in the second half of 2025. For Calvin Klein, in February 2026 she was also the face of its Elixir three-fragrances launch.

=== Infrastructure ===
On 12 February 2024, Rosalía's family constituted a new company, Tresmamis SL, settled to "promote, construct, purchase, sale, lease and create the general marketing of all kinds of buildings". Her mother María Pilar Tobella became as its chairperson and CEO. Through Tresmamis SL, Rosalía is expected to build a recording studio complex in the future Cultural District in l'Hospitalet de Llobregat.

== Personal life ==
She is of paternal Galician-Castilian (Note: Although Rosalia's father was born in Cudillero, Asturias, he has described his birth place as "circumstantial" for work-related reasons. Vila explained his family left the town soon after, and that none of his relatives were from the area.) and maternal Catalan heritage. Her paternal great-grandfather was Cuban of Galician origin. She speaks English, as well as her native Catalan and Spanish. She has attention deficit hyperactivity disorder.

=== Relationships ===
In 2016, Rosalía started dating Spanish rapper C. Tangana. They co-wrote eight of the eleven songs of Rosalía's second album El mal querer and recorded "Antes de morirme". They broke up in May 2018. Since then, they have referenced each other in songs, social media posts, interviews and music videos. In April 2020, Tangana told the press that there "exists a good friendship between the two". Rosalía unfollowed and blocked Tangana on social media in December 2020 after he spoke about her disparagingly in an interview.

Rosalía was in a brief relationship with American actress and model Hunter Schafer for about five months in 2019, which was confirmed by Schafer in her cover story for GQ in April 2024. The two remain close friends; Schafer considers her to be "family no matter what."

In November 2019, Rosalía met Puerto Rican singer Rauw Alejandro in a hotel in Las Vegas days before the 20th Annual Latin Grammy Awards. They went on their first date in December after Alejandro asked her out while in Madrid. After much public speculation, they made their relationship public in September 2021. They got engaged on 31 December 2022 in Carolina, Puerto Rico. On 25 July 2023, media reported the end of their engagement, which was confirmed by Rauw Alejandro the following day. The couple had worked on different projects while being together. Rosalía is credited as a songwriter and background vocalist on two songs on Alejandro's debut album Afrodisíaco (2020), one of them being the single "Dile a Él", as well as "Corazón Despeinado", from the 2022 album Saturno. He also contributed a line on Rosalía's "Chicken Teriyaki". They released a joint EP titled RR on 24 March 2023, featuring the single "Beso".

Rosalía was in a relationship with American actor Jeremy Allen White from late 2023 until the summer of 2024, when they had a "mutual breakup". In the spring and early summer of 2025, Rosalía was briefly linked to German actor Emilio Sakraya. Rosalía has been in a relationship with French model Loli Bahia since late 2025.

== Philanthropy and political views ==
Rosalía identifies as a feminist. After being congratulated at the 2019 Billboard Women in Music gala, the singer stated: "I was fifteen when I entered a recording studio for the first time having all these women as references. I was so shocked by the fact that there were only men in that session that, since that moment, I've been fighting for having the same number of men and women in the studio. As simple as that".

Rosalía is pro-choice. During a concert in Mexico, she wore a green handkerchief in support of the National Campaign for the Right to Legal, Safe and Free Abortion. Additionally, she is firmly pro-LGBT; all profits from her Viva Glam cosmetic campaign were to be given in support of women, youth and the LGBT community. In July 2021, she condemned the homophobic killing of Samuel Luiz, stating, "Samuel didn't die, he was murdered".

In November 2019, following a second general Spanish election in the country within six months, Rosalía tweeted "fuck Vox". Vox is a far-right nationalist political party that had earned a considerable number of seats at the Spanish Parliament and was growing in popularity at the time. After being asked about politics at a press conference a couple days later, she said: "I think it is a very delicate topic and I don't think this is the place to talk about it."

In May 2020, Rosalía expressed anger for the murder of George Floyd and briefly attended a protest in Miami in defence of racial equality, leaving early in order to appear on a virtual benefit concert organised by TeleHit. In October, she offered her song "A Palé" for a vote-encouraging campaign of Sony Music for the 2020 United States presidential election titled "Your Voice. Your Power. Your Vote".

In late July 2025, after Miguel Adrover publicly refused to design for her due to her silence on the Gaza war, Rosalía condemned the violence, war crimes and inaction of "those who make decisions and have the power to act". In January 2026, she took part in the benefit concert "Act x Palestine".

In July 2026, Rosalía made a major donation to UNICEF Spain to support children and families affected by the twin 7.2 and 7.5-magnitude earthquakes that struck Venezuela.

== Discography ==
- Los Ángeles (2017)
- El mal querer (2018)
- Motomami (2022)
- Lux (2025)

== Filmography ==
=== Film ===
Year	Film	Role	Notes
2019	Pain and Glory	Rosita	Cameo

=== Television ===
Year	Show	Role	Notes	Ref.
2008	Tú Sí Que Vales	Herself	Contestant	
2018	Later... with Jools Holland	Herself	Performer	
2018	Late Motiv	Herself	Performer	
2019	33rd Goya Awards	Herself	Performer	
2019	Mixtape	Herself	Commentarist	
2020	Austin City Limits	Herself	Performer	
2020	Savage x Fenty Show Vol. 2	Herself	Performer	
2021	Saturday Night Live	Herself	Guest performer	
2021	Lola	Herself	Commentarist	
2022	Caminos del Flamenco	Herself	Commentarist	
2022	Chillin Island	Herself	Guest	
2022	Saturday Night Live	Herself	Musical guest; Episode: "Zoë Kravitz/Rosalía"	
2023	I Am Georgina	Herself	Cameo	
2026	Euphoria	Magick	Recurring role; (season 3)	
2026	Saturday Night Live	Herself	Musical guest; Episode: "Shane Gillis/Rosalía"	

=== Music videos ===
Year	Title	Artist(s)	Role
2019	"Adore You"	Harry Styles	Narrator
2020	"WAP"	Cardi B, Megan Thee Stallion	Herself

=== Commercials ===
Year	Product(s)	Brand(s)	Ref.
2020	Air Max 2090	Nike	
2020	VG26 Lipstick	MAC Cosmetics	
2022	Skims		
2023	Move	Coca-Cola	
2023	Cupra Racing	SEAT	
2025	Calvin Klein Fall 2025	Calvin Klein	

== Tours ==
- Los Ángeles Tour (2017–2018)
- El Mal Querer Tour (2019)
- Motomami World Tour (2022)
- Lux Tour (2026)
