= Los Ángeles (album) =

2017 studio album by Rosalía

Studio album by Rosalía
- Released: February 10, 2017
- Recorded: August 2016
- Studio: Estudios Calamar (Barcelona)
- Genres: New flamenco; folk
- Length: 49:06
- Languages: Spanish; English
- Label: Universal Spain
- Producer: Raül Refree

Rosalía chronology
Los Ángeles (2017)	El mal querer (2018)

Singles from Los Ángeles
- 1. "Catalina" Released: 19 October 2016; 2. "De Plata" Released: 26 May 2017

Los Ángeles (pronounced [los ˈaŋxeles]; Spanish for 'the angels') is the debut studio album by Spanish singer Rosalía and collaborative cover album with Raül Refree as co-author, artist, producer, guitarist and arranger. It was released to critical acclaim on 10 February 2017 by Universal Music Group in Spain.

== Background ==
Rosalía began performing in tablaos a decade before the release of her recording debut, gradually becoming a well-known vocalist within Barcelona's flamenco circuit. She worked as a guest artist and supporting act for various artists, including Chicuelo, Enric Palomar, La Fura dels Baus, Miguel Poveda and Rocío Márquez, performing across countries such as Germany, Singapore and Panama and events like the 2015 Primavera Sound and an APAP conference in New York City. She told ABC: "I have done many collaborations with other musicians, and I have always tried that they were older than me, in order to learn from them." Rosalía grew up in a family with no artistic background that mostly listened to music in English. She discovered flamenco at thirteen when her friends played Camarón de la Isla while meeting in a park after school, soon becoming fascinated with the genre and studying it on her own. As she immersed herself in the Catalan flamenco scene, Rosalía met local fixture José Miguel Vizcaya, known as El Chiqui de la Línea, who suggested she start a degree in music. "El Chiqui" became Rosalía's teacher for the following eight years, as she studied Interpretation of Flamenco Singing at the Catalonia College of Music (Catalan: Escola Superior de Música de Catalunya, ESMUC). The ESMUC only accepts one student of this discipline per year, and Rosalía was selected in 2014. The singer has described "El Chiqui" as a fundamental figure in her career, who encouraged her to investigate the genre even further back in time. Speaking with ABC, she stated: "To me, flamenco was Camarón, something of gypsy aesthetics, and when going back I found many other things that I loved. [...] When I discovered cantaores like Niño de la Huerta or "El Gloria", "El Chiqui" taught me to listen and appreciate their singing, because their recordings sound very bad! To people of our age that sound seems terrible to us."

== Composition ==
"Catalina"
The album's lead single and "reference song", "Catalina" is a tango update in which "Rosalía's voice [competes] with Refree's guitar for the foreground."

Los Ángeles is a concept album that collects a series of cantes which have death as its central theme. It is a presentation of Rosalía as a soloist cantaora and as such its structure is similar to that of the debut of any orthodox flamenco singer: "a selection of varied palos, often with traditional or popular lyrics, in which the artist shows his or her aptitude and background." In this manner, the singer encompasses several forms of the genre, including alegrías, tangos, fandangos, fandanguillos, seguidillas, tarantas, malagueñas and "more specific" styles like guajira, saeta and milonga. Rosalía felt that in the album "the cantes become songs", and as such did not list the palos's titles in the track listing, explaining that: "It's a way of saying that I am based on melodies and lyrics from cantes, but we turn it into something else. Those who know something about flamenco will be able to identify them, because we are influenced by that, but we do our own thing."

It includes a cover of Enrique Morente's Aunque era de noche of Saint John of the Cross's 16th-century poem as well as a cover of La Hija de Juan Simón (1934).

Rosalía told Ecleen Luzmila Caraballo of Jezebel in 2018: "I feel like with Los Ángeles, I wanted to establish my musical legacy... and honor the classic sound of flamenco in the most traditional sense, respecting them to the maximum, with a pop and experimental structure, but with very basic instrumentation and a minimalist sound—just guitar and voice."

== Release and promotion ==
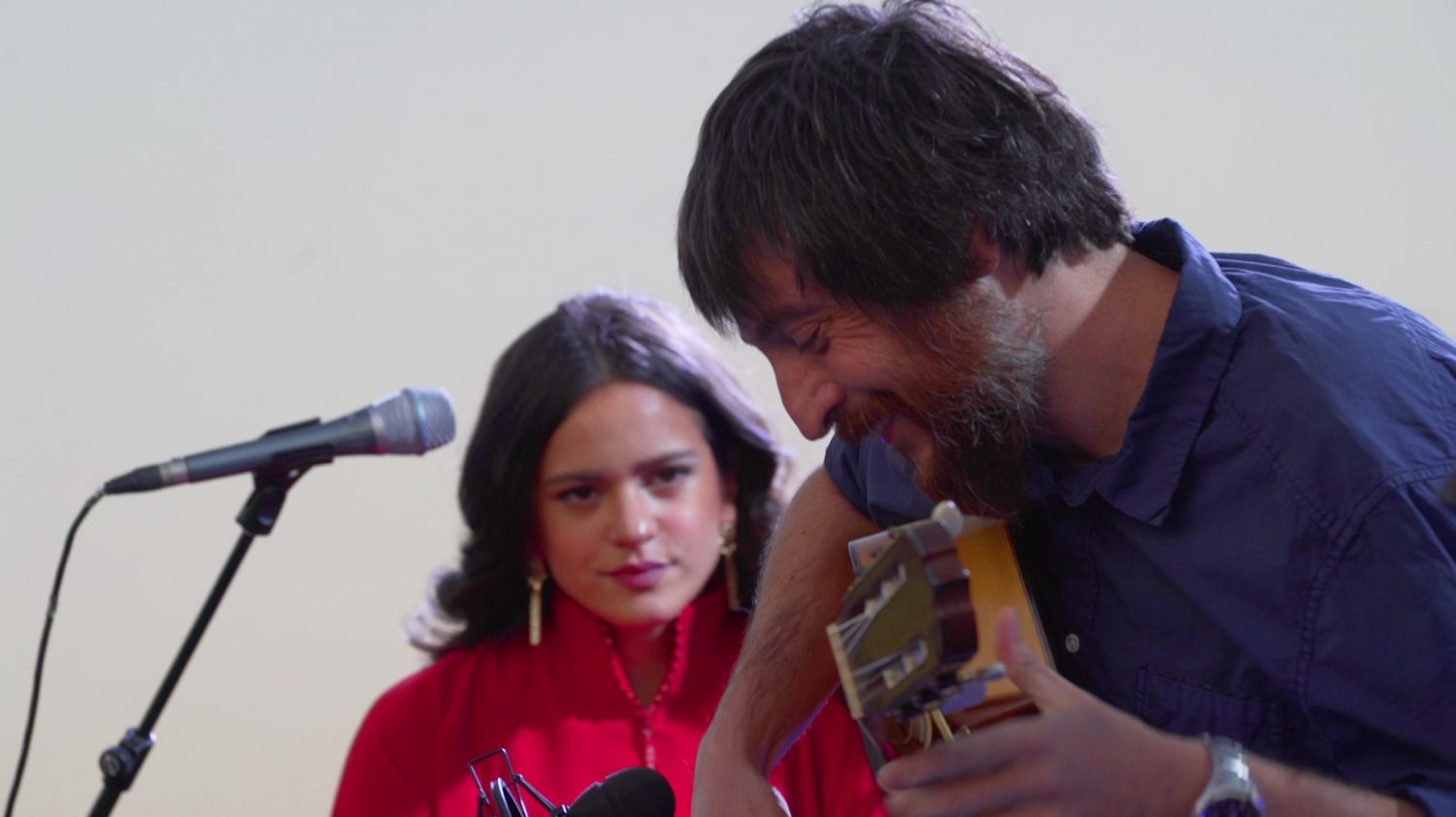
Rosalía and Raül Refree performing in Madrid, July 24, 2017.

Los Ángeles was released on 20 February 2017 on Universal Music Spain. It was released at digital audio stores and streaming platforms, as well as a CD and double LP record. "Catalina" was released as the album's lead single on 17 October 2016 and presented by Rosalía in Radio 3, after having shared its B side "Que se muere, que se muere" online a few weeks before. Its music video was directed by Txema Yeste and has been described as "a visual translation of the power of this song". An electronic press kit (EPK) featuring English subtitles was published in Rosalía's YouTube channel on 21 April 2017. The video was produced by Yverz and directed by Bàrbara Farré, with photography by Lucas Casanovas and animation by Pepe Gay.

Spanish filmmaking collective Manson directed the music video for the second single "De plata", which features the singer performing the track as she walks and dances in the streets of Los Angeles, California. It was published in Rosalía's YouTube channel on 26 May 2017. Luis Troquel of Rockdelux felt that the clip showed a "facet of Rosalía that was unknown to many", as she dances "with a glowing enchantment and exuberant style." Manson shot the clip in 16 mm film, as they "wanted to portray Rosalía as a classic Hollywood star, but with a contemporary sensibility." The collective told Nowness that they chose the song because it had a "Tarantino-esque vibe" that they thought matched Los Angeles. They further explained: "Her art is very pure and wild and we wanted a video to match—no camera tricks, no VFX, no ornaments, no Tumblr aesthetics, just the pure and raw performance of a new-born classic star." A cover version of Enrique Morente's "Aunque es de noche", which was not included in the album and had only been performed live, was released as a single on 2 November 2017 on streaming platforms. Its music video was directed by Ignasi Monreal and produced by CANADA in collaboration with Pink Salt and Collateral Films, with animation by Iria López, Dani Negrín and Bjørn-Erik Aschim from the London animation studio The Line. Filmed as a long take, the video's first two minutes show the inside of a car filled with elements of Christian symbolism, leading the viewer to Rosalía sitting on a chair. The singer then stands up and shows that she is inside a cemetery and in the last minutes, animation appears around and on her. According to Rosalía, the music video "intends to be a celebration of death as part of life", and as such has been linked to the concept of Los Ángeles. In between recording for the video, Monreal also filmed Rosalía performing an a capella rendition of the track, which was released via Nowness on 14 December 2017.

== Critical reception ==
Professional ratings
Review scores
Source	Rating
AllMusic	3.5/5 stars
Jenesaispop	8.5/10
Mondo Sonoro	9/10

Los Ángeles was met with critical acclaim from music critics. Spanish magazine Rockdelux called it "one of the most intense and sweeping debuts of recent times", with critic Juan Monge complimenting its mix of tradition and avant-garde. AllMusic's Mariano Prunes highly commended Rosalía's vocals, writing that "her instrument is a tornado capable of sweeping away any cultural or language barriers", while noting that "she does not accomplish this with sheer volume or vocal histrionics, but by reaching almost unbearable levels of intensity and expression." He concluded that Los Ángeles "signals the appearance of a major talent in both the flamenco and the world music scene." Writing for MondoSonoro, Yeray S. Iborra felt that with Los Ángeles, Rosalía "is posited as the contemporary cantaora who has better understood the current times", noting the difference between the album and her "more American" collaboration with C. Tangana. Pitchfork called it an "intimate understanding of the flamenco canon through an aesthetic closer to minimalist indie rock".

=== Flamenco specialists ===
In an El Confidencial article, musician and investigator Pedro Lópeh criticized the album, particularly Refree's arrangements, deeming them "artificial" and "wearisome". His views coincided with those of Silvia Cruz, another flamenco specialist. She explained: "I also insist on talking about Refree because the criticisms are always aimed against her and rarely if ever against him, when he is the producer and primary author of this album. I do not think Los Ángeles does any harm to flamenco, but it is a decontextualized product. Apart from the lyrics, I do not hear anything in it that evokes the history of flamenco, its roots or its hallmarks. For that reason, it does not seem to me a groundbreaking or revolutionary work and if it has come to save anything, it is the music industry, not flamenco." ABC's Alberto García Reyes told eldiario.es that while he does not consider Los Ángeles to be "an aberration", he feels Rosalía is not suited to the genre. He said: "Rosalía does not sing badly, but in flamenco she does not fit much. She is a very respectful girl, who has not come barging in to invent a revolution. She is not hurting anyone and has not proclaimed herself master of anything." He was also critical of the album's promotional campaign, arguing that it hailed the unworthy image of Rosalía as "the great revolution of flamenco".

== Accolades ==
Los Ángeles ranked highly in the year-end lists of the Spanish specialized press. It was listed as the best Spanish album of 2017 by newspaper ABC and magazine Rockdelux. Readers of the Barcelonian edition of Time Out selected Los Ángeles as the best album of 2017, with the publication describing Rosalía as "the musical revelation of 2017". The album also appeared at number 6 in the year-end list of Spanish online magazine Jenesaispop, which described it as "an unbeatable presentation, up to the expectations, which are even higher in the face of a bright future." CrazyMusic ranked the album at number 8 in its list of the best Spanish albums of 2017. Music critics of El País listed Los Ángeles as the tenth best album of the year. Efe Eme selected the album as the 13th best Spanish record of 2017. It also appeared in Hipersónica's and Muzikalia's lists of the best Spanish albums of the year, at number 17 and 18 respectively.

In late 2017, Rosalía received the Premio Ojo Crítico in the category of Modern Music, awarded by RNE. The jury highlighted the singer's "artistic projection, her interpretative capacity and versatility, her charisma, capable of transferring flamenco to young audiences." Rosalía was also nominated for Best New Artist at the 2017 Latin Grammy Awards, losing to Vicente García. On 17 January 2018, Los Ángeles was awarded the Premio Ruido, given to the best national album of the year by the Spanish music press. The album also received a Premio Glamour to "the arts", awarded by the Spanish edition of Glamour magazine in celebration of its 15th anniversary.

== Commercial performance ==
Los Ángeles debuted at number 42 on the Spanish Albums Chart on 19 February 2017. A month later, Sebas E. Alonso of Jenesaispop.com noted that the album had remained charting since its release, ascending to number twenty-eight in its third week and maintaining that position the following week. Feeling that it was in its way to becoming the Spanish "sleeper hit of the year", Alonso described Los Ángeles's chart run as "totally exceptional", taking into account that most albums "after the hype of the fans during the first week, [fall] slightly on the list until they settle depending on the duration of the promotion of the album or directly collapse." Likewise, Jordi Bardají wrote on 1 November 2018 that the record was "one of the greatest 'sleepers' that Spanish sales lists have known in recent times." Los Ángeles reached its peak position of number nine on 11 November 2018 and remained in the albums chart until 9 February 2020, accumulating a total of 116 weeks.

== Track listing ==
All tracks produced by Raül Refree. All songs are in the public domain, except where noted.

Los Ángeles track listing
No.	Title	Writer(s)	Length
1.	"Si tú supieras compañero"	Rosalia Vila Tobella; Raül Fernandez Miró; Public domain; Manuel López-Quiroga y Miquel; Rafael de León y Arias de Saavedra; Nicolás M. Callejón López Alcalá	6:04
2.	"De plata"		4:28
3.	"Nos quedamos solitos"		5:15
4.	"Catalina"		3:34
5.	"Día 14 de abril"	Public domain; Antonio Machado	6:06
6.	"Que se muere, que se muere"	Rafael Farina	1:28
7.	"Por mi puerta no lo pasen"		4:39
8.	"Te venero"	Public domain; Joaquin Alfonso; José Tejada; Jose Arroyo	4:06
9.	"Por castigarme tan fuerte"		2:08
10.	"La hija de Juan Simón"		4:09
11.	"El redentor"		3:01
12.	"I See a Darkness"	Will Oldham	4:08
Total length:			49:06

Notes

- "Si tú supieras compañero" partly reinterprets "La Chiquita Piconera", written by Manuel López-Quiroga y Miquel, Rafael de León y Arias de Saavedra and Nicolás M. Callejón López Alcalá.
- "De plata" partly reinterprets "Cuando Yo Me Muera", performed by Manolo Caracol and Melchor de Marchena, and "El Querer Que Yo Te Tengo", performed by Manolo Frenegal.
- "Que se muere, que se muere" partly reinterprets "Que se Muere", written by Rafael Farina.
- "Te venero" partly reinterprets “Cuba Linda, Te Venero”, written by Joaquin Alfonso, José Tejada and Jose Arroyo.
- "I See a Darkness" is a cover of the Bonnie "Prince" Billy track.

== Personnel ==
=== Musicians ===
- Rosalía – vocals
- Raül Refree – guitar, arrangement

=== Technical ===
- Alex Psaroudakis – mastering

=== Artwork ===
- Folch – set design
- Txema Yeste – photography
- Cristina Ramos – set design

== Charts ==
=== Weekly charts ===
Weekly chart performance for Los Ángeles
Chart (2018)	Peak position
Spanish Albums (PROMUSICAE)	9

=== Year-end charts ===
Year-end chart performance for Los Ángeles
Chart (2017)	Position
Spanish Albums (PROMUSICAE)	92
Chart (2018)	Position
Spanish Albums (PROMUSICAE)	46
Chart (2019)	Position
Spanish Albums (PROMUSICAE)	65

== Certifications ==
Region	Certification	Certified units/sales
Spain (Promusicae)	Gold	20,000^{‡}
^{‡} Sales+streaming figures based on certification alone.

== See also ==
- 2017 in European music
- 2017 in Latin music
- List of concept albums
- Music of Andalusia
- Music of Catalonia
