= Raül Refree =

Spanish musician and producer

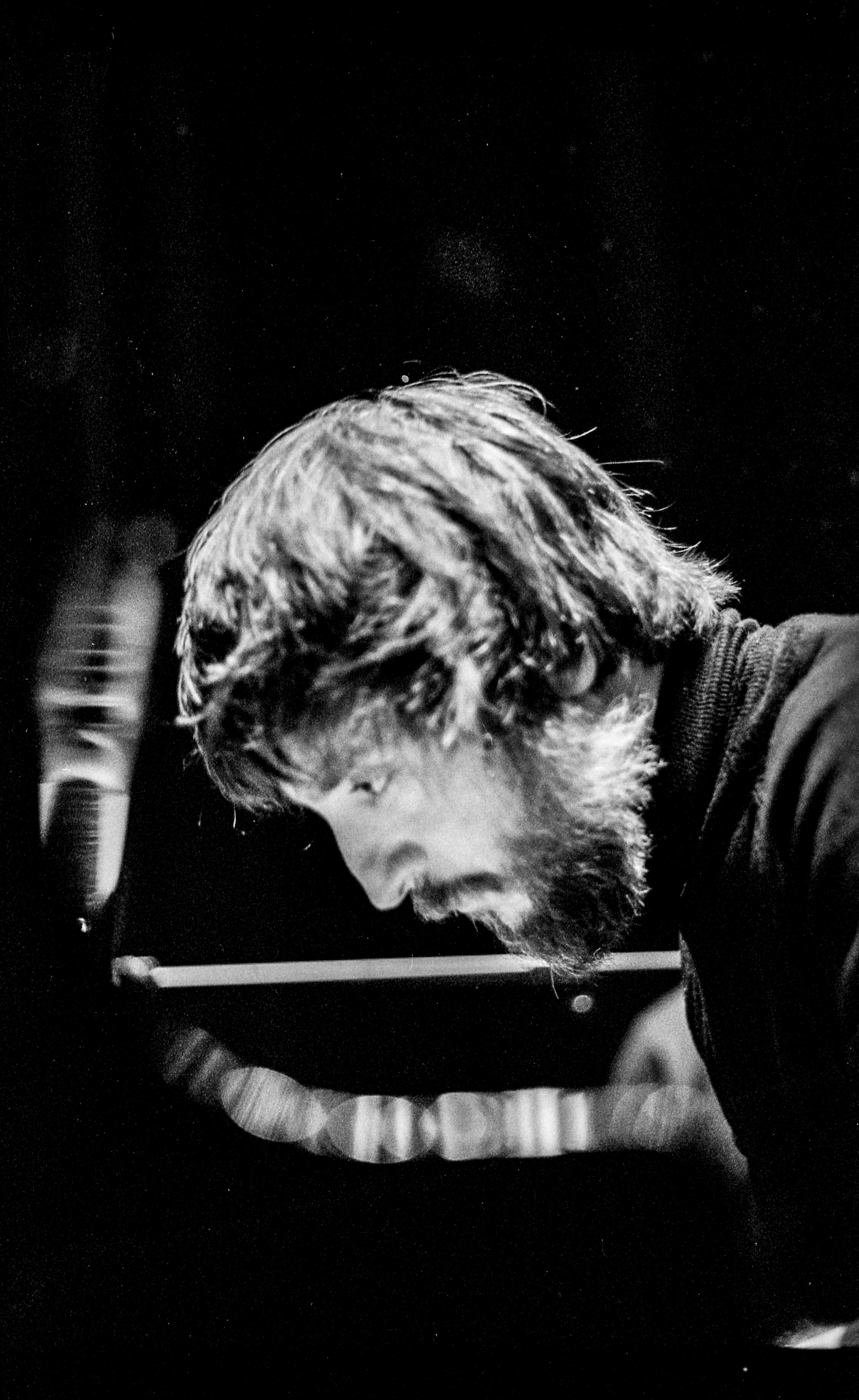

Background information
- Born: Raül Fernández Miró; 1976 (age 49–50); Barcelona, Spain
- Genres: Avant-folk, experimental rock, new flamenco
- Occupations: Producer, musician
- Instruments: Guitar, keyboards
- Years active: 1996–present
- Labels: Acuarela; Marxophone
- Member of: Refree
- Formerly of: Corn Flakes; Romodance; Sitcom; Élena
- Website: raulrefree.com

Raül Fernández Miró (Barcelona, 1976), better known as Raül Refree, is a Spanish music producer, musician, composer and writer.

== Career ==
Raül joined the melodic hardcore group from Barcelona, Corn Flakes in 1996, with whom he recorded Ménage (1997). Later, he formed two groups: Romodance, which released Little Symphonies for the Kids (1998) and Zorras (1999), and Sitcom, with a self-titled album in 1999. He embarked on a new adventure with the band Élena, oriented towards a more experimental pop sound, resulting in Porelamordedios (2001) and Present (2003). He directed and arranged the concert The Rockdelux Experience to celebrate the 200th issue of Rockdelux magazine. He repeated the experience in 2004 to celebrate the magazine's 20th anniversary. Both concerts were later released on CD.

Also in 2002, he began his more personal, intimate project, Refree, with the album Quitamiedos, followed by Nones, La matrona , Els invertebrats , Matilda, Tots Sants, Nova Creu Alta, Jai Alai, La otra mitad, El espacio entre, works in which Raül alternates between Spanish and Catalan or intstrumental music.

In 2007 Raül created the show Immigrasons, inspired by the migratory flows between Catalonia and Argentina, commissioned by the Mercat de Música Viva de Vic (MVV). This project marked the beginning of a long and fruitful artistic relationship with Silvia Pérez Cruz (then the singer of Las Migas). Also commissioned by the MMVV, she worked in 2008 with the Mexican artists Cabezas de Cera and Juan Pablo Villa on the album Vientos y lugares. That same year, he directed and arranged the show OJO con la Mala, featuring Mala Rodríguez and the Original Jazz Orchestra of the Taller de Músics. Also in 2008, he received the Premi Ciutat de Barcelona.

In 2009, he began composing film scores with the music for the TV3 series Infidels, and, as a result of his collaboration with the American singer-songwriter Josh Rouse, he toured extensively in Europe and the United States.

In 2014, he released a duo album with Sílvia Pérez Cruz, granada and in 2017, Raül released a duo album with Rosalía, Los Ángeles. On both albums Raül is co-writer, artist, producer, guitarist and arranger.

His musical productions fuse experimental rock, flamenco, traditional music, electronic music, singer-songwriter music, and pop with occasional influences from contemporary music.

In 2018, he participated in the 3D multimedia show "Miedo" (Fear), starring Albert Pla and produced by the Buenos Aires Theater Complex, which also featured the artist group Mondongo. His collaboration as a producer on Amaia Romero's debut album was also announced.

He has collaborated on albums with Richard Youngs (All Hands Around The Moment, Soft Abuse, 2019), Lina (Lina_Raül Refree, Glitterbeat, 2020), and Lee Ranaldo (Names of North End Women, Mute, 2020).

His most recent works in which he has worked as artist, composer, instrumentalist, and arranger and producer, has been in duo format, releasing albums such as Cru+es with Niño de Elche (Sony, 2025), Un final que parece un principio with Gala i Ovidio (RRR 2025), and San Paolo di Galatina with Maria Mazzotta (Galileo Music, 2026).

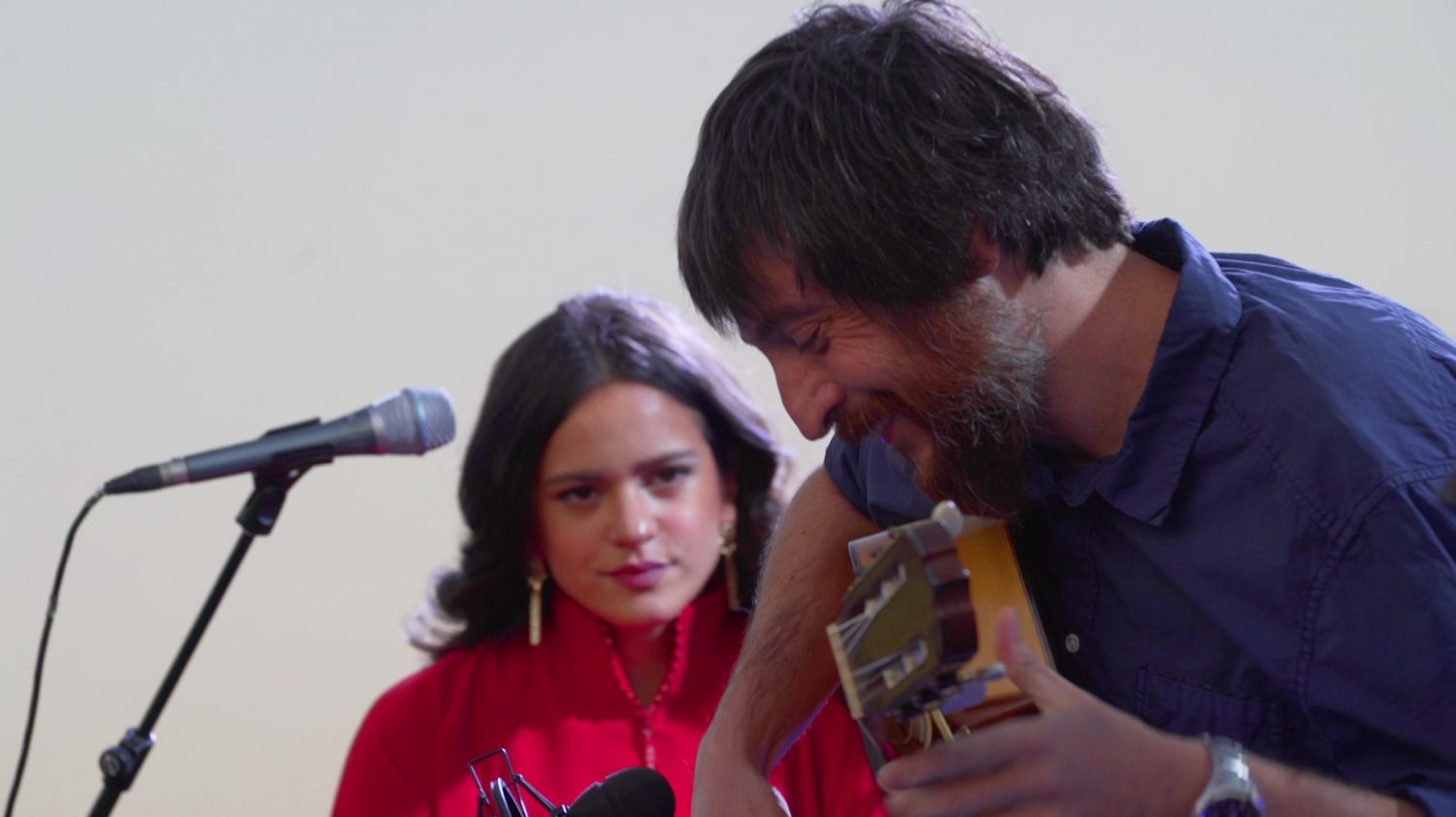
Refree performing in tandem with Rosalía at the Parque de la Cuña Verde de O'Donnell in 2017

In recent years, he has focused his solo activity on composing soundtracks for film and television, notably his work for the television series La Mesías (Movistar+), the films Un año, una noche (Isaki Lacuesta) and Muyeres (Marta Lallana), among others.

He has worked with artists such as Guitarricadelafuente, Ricky Martin, C. Tangana, Rosalía, Gianna Nannini, Niño de Elche, Sharon Van Etten, Rodrigo Cuevas, Lina, La MODA, Lee Ranaldo and Luisa Sobral, Rocío Márquez, Roger Mas, Nacho Umbert, Senior i el Cor Brutal, Christina Rosenvinge, Las Migas, Silvia Pérez Cruz, Josh Rouse, Kiko Veneno, Mala Rodríguez, among other musicians.

In October of last year (2025) Raül Refree published his first book, Cuando todo encaja, with the publisher Debate (Penguin Random House)

== Discography ==
- Refree, Quitamiedos (Acuarela, 2002)
- Refree, Nones (Acuarela, 2003)
- Refree, La matrona (Acuarela, 2005)
- Refree, Els invertebrats (Acuarela, 2007)
- Refree, Matilda (Marxophone, 2010)
- Refree, Tots Sants (2012)
- Refree, Nova Creu Alta (El segell del Primavera, 2013)
- Sílvia Pérez Cruz & Raül Fernandez Miró (Raül Refree), granada (2014, Universal Music Spain)
- Rosalía (Rosalía Vila & Raül Refree), Los Ángeles (2017, Universal Music Spain)
- Refree, Jai Alai vol.01 (El Segell del Primavera, 2017)
- Refree Jai Alai vol.02 (2018)
- Albert Pla & Raül Refree, Miedo (BSO) (Enunplisplas Música, 2018)
- Refree, La otra mitad (Glitterbeat/tak:til, 2018)
- Lee Ranaldo & Raül Refree, Names of North End Women (Single) (Mute, 2019)
- Lina & Raül Refree, Cuidei que Tinha Morrido (Single) (Glitterbeat, 2019)
- Richard Youngs & Raül Refree, All Hands Around The Moment, (Soft Abuse, 2019)
- Lina & Raül Refree, Lina_Raül Refree (Glitterbeat, 2020)
- Lee Ranaldo & Raül Refree, Names of North End Women (Mute, 2020)
- Refree, El espacio entre (Tak:til, Glitterbeat, 2023)
- Raül Refree & Pedro Vian, Font de la Vera Pau (Modern Obscure Music, 2023)
- Raül Refree, La Mesías BSO (Movistar Sound, 2023)
- Gianna Nannini & Raül Refree, Mi mancava una canzone che parlasse di te (song) (from the album Sei nel l'anima) (Sony Music Entertainment Italy, 2024)
- Gala i Ovidio, Un final que parece un principio (RRR records, 2025)
- Raül Refree & Niño de Elche, Cru+es (Sony Entertainment Spain, 2025)
- Raül Refree & Maria Mazzotta, San Paolo di Galatina (Galileo Music, 2026)

== Productions ==
- The Rockdelux Experience (2002)
- The Rockdelux Experience vol. II (2004)
- El Hijo, La piel del oso (ep, 2005)
- Roger Mas, Mística doméstica (2006)
- Aroah, El día después (2007)
- El Hijo, Las otras vidas (2007)
- El Hijo, Madrileña (2010)
- Las Migas, Reinas del Matute (Nuevos Medios, 2011)
- Nacho Umbert, Ay... (Acuarela, 2010)
- Senior i el Cor Brutal, Gran (Malatesta Records i La Casa Calba, 2011)
- Fernando Alfaro, La vida es extraña y rara (2011)
- Christina Rosenvinge, Un caso sin resolver. (Warner, 2011)
- Nacho Umbert, No os creáis ni la mitad ( Acuarela, 2011)
- Silvia Pérez Cruz, 11 de novembre (Universal Music Spain, 2012)
- Els Pets, L'àrea petita (2013)
- Kiko Veneno, Sensación Térmica (Warner, 2013)
- Silvia Pérez Cruz, Granada (Universal Music Spain, 2014),
- Rocío Márquez, El Niño (Universal, 2014)
- Lee Ranaldo, Acoustic Dust (2014)
- Nacho Umbert, Familia (2015)
- Christina Rosenvinge, Lo nuestro (El segell del Primavera, 2015)
- Maria Rodés, Creo que no soy yo (2016)
- Josele Santiago, Transilvania (2017)
- Lee Ranaldo, Electric Trim (Mute, 2017)
- Rocío Márquez, Firmamento (Universal Music Spain, 2017)
- 77, Bright Gloom (Century Media, 2018)
- El Niño de Elche, Antología del Cante Flamenco Heterodoxo (Sony Music Entertainment Spain, 2018)
- Amaia Romero, Un nuevo lugar (single) (2018, Universal Music Spain), as author and producer
- C. Tangana, El Niño de Elche, Un Veneno (Sony Music Entertainment Spain, 2018)
- Luísa Sobral, Rosa (Universal Music Portugal, 2018)
- La M.O.D.A., La Zona Galáctica (2019)
- La M.O.D.A, Colectivo Nostalgia (2019)
- Rodrigo Cuevas, Manual de Cortejo, Rodrigo Cuevas Ronda a Raül Refree (Aris Música, 13 December 2019)
- Lina & Raül Refree, Lina_Raül Refree (Glitterbeat, 2020)
- Cocanha, Puput (Pagans, 2020)
- Guitarricadelafuente, Desde las Alturas (Tumbalacasa, 2020)
- nostalgia.en.los.autobuses, Delfines (single) (Altafonte, 2020)
- nostalgia.en.los.autobuses, Las tumbas de los escritores (single) (Altafonte, 2020)
- nostalgia.en.los.autobuses, Naturaleza (single) (Altafonte, 2020)
- nostalgia.en.los.autobuses, Ojos brillantes (single) (Altafonte, 2020)
- Ricky Martin, Quiéreme (single from PAUSA) (Sony Music US, 2020)
- Guitarricadelafuente, Ya Mi Mama Me Decía (Tumbalacasa, 2020)
- Anaju, Rota (Sony, 2020)
- La M.O.D.A, Ninguna Ola (La M.O.D.A., 2020)
- C. Tangana, Un Veneno (G-Mix) [El Madrileño] (Sony Music Entertainment España, 2021)
- Sílvia Pérez Cruz, Disculpe, Babe [El Justiciero, Cha, Cha, Cha: Un tributo a Os Mutantes] (Warner/Chappell Brasil)
- Gabriela Richardson, Palomita Negrita (The Project Music Talent, sl, 2021)
- Guitarricadelafuente, Mil y Una Noches (Sony Entertainment Spain, 2021)
- Guitarricadelafuente, Vidalita y el mar (Sony Entertainment Spain, 2022)
- Perrate, Tres Golpes (fandango callejero) (single) (Lovemonk Discos Buenos / El Volcán Música, 2022)
- Maestro Espada, Murciana y Estrellica (singles) (La Castanya, 2022)
- Guitarricadelafuente, La Cantera (Sony Entertainment Spain, 2022)
- Niño de Elche, Flamenco. Mausoleo de celebración, amor y muerte (Sony Entertainment Spain, 2022)
- Adriano Galante, El mismo paisaje (from the album Toda una alegría) (Halley Records, 2023)
- Bikôkô, Jealousy (single) (Future Bounce LTD, 2024)
- Gabriela Richardson, Tu mirada mientras (Virgin Music Spain, 2024)
- Gianna Nannini, Mi mancava una canzone che parlasse di te (song) (from the album Sei nel l'anima) (Sony Music Entertainment Italy, 2024)
- Maestro Espada, Maestro Espada (Sony Entertainment Spain, 2024)
- Guitarricadelafuente, Spanish Leather (Sony Entertainment Spain, 2025)
- Guitarricadelafuente & Troye Sivan, midsummer pipe dream (Sony Entertainment Spain, 2025)
- Guitarricadelafuente, En la noche más fría (Sony Entertainment Spain, 2025)

== Soundtracks (BSO) ==
- Infidels, TV series. From 2009 to 2011 (Diagonal TV/ TVC, 2009–11)
- Barcelona era una fiesta underground, 1970–1980, documentary directed by Morrosko Vila-San-Juan (Séptimo Elemento, 2010)
- Barcelona Ciutat Neutral, TV series directed by Sònia Sánchez (Prodigius Cinema/TVC, 2011)
- Et dec una nit de divendres, TV movie directed by Dimas Rodríguez (Imuff Prod./TVC, 2013)
- Line-up, film directed by Àlex Julià (Igloo Films Prod./Primavera Sound, 2014)
- Les nenes no haurien de jugar al fútbol, TV movie directed by Sònia Sánchez (Zentropa Int./TVC, 2014)
- Yoghurt Utopia, documentary by Anna Thomson & David Baksh (2017)
- Black is Beltza, animated film directed by Fermín Muguruza (ETB / Setmàgic Audiovisual / Talka Records & Films, 2018)
- Entre dos aguas, directed by Isaki Lacuesta (La Termita Films, 2018)
- Ojos Negros, directed by Marta Lallana and Ivet Castelo (Nanouk Films, 2019)
- Un año, una noche, directed by Isaki Lacuesta (Bambú Prod., Nov. 2022)
- Yerma, directed by Juan Carlos Martel, written by Frederico Lorca (Teatre Lliure, 2022)
- Muyeres, directed by Marta Lallana (2023) (Official Section Shanghai International Film Festival, SIFF) - Creator, composer and actor
- La Mesías, by Javier Calvo y Javier Ambrossi (Movistar, oct. 2023)
- La Chaparra, documental by Elena Molina (Movistar +, 2026) *TBC
- Mala Bèstia, film by Bàrbara Farré (Mimosa Produce, July 2026)
- La bola negra, film by Javier Calvo & Javier Ambrossi (Movistar, 2 octubre 2026)

== Collaborations ==
- String and metal arrangements in El tiempo de las cerezas, of Nacho Vegas and Enrique Bunbury. (2006)
- Immigrasons. Co-director of the project. (Discmedi, 2006)
- 15 anys del Teatre-Auditori de Sant Cugat (15 years of the Auditorium Theater of Sant Cugat). Direction and arrangements for orchestra. Together with the Orquestra Nacional Clàssica d'Andorra. (2008)
- Vientos y lugares. Co-director of the project; with Juan Pablo Villa y Cabezas de Cera. (Sonoesfera, 2008)
- Refree & Standstill interpret E.Varèse, R.Strauss, G.Ligeti, S.Reich y J.Adams. Festival Digressions of Auditorio de Barcelona (2008)
- Ojo con la Mala. Musical director of the concert of Mala Rodríguez with the Original Jazz Orquestra del Taller de Músics. (2008)
- Doubles with Josh Rouse for Europe and USA (2009/2010)
- Brindando con José Alfredo Jiménez with the song "Cuando vivas conmigo". (2010)
- Cançons de bandolers i molt mala gent (Songs of bandits and bad people), show with Maria Rodés. Musical direction and arrangements. (2010)
- Collaborations in recording of Josh Rouse & The Long Vacations, of Josh Rouse (2011)
- Rèquiem, with Enric Montefusco (2012)
- Ukulele on the song Last Night on Earth of Lee Ranaldo (2013)
- Guerra, interactive musical in 3D, with Albert Pla and Fermin Muguruza (2015–2016)
- Miedo, interactive musical in 3D, with Albert Pla(2018-)
- A Tocar!, Opening of Festival Grec 2020, with Baró D'Evel, Mal Pelo, Frederic Amat & friends (2020)

== Awards ==
- Album of the year for the magazine Rockdelux for Nones (2003)
- Award Enderrock "Best Album" for La matrona (2005)
- Award Altaveu "Best pop-rock album" for La matrona (2005)
- Award Puig Porret for La matrona (2005)
- Award Ciutat de Barcelona (2008)
- Award Enderrock – Joan Trayter "Best Musical Production" (2011)
- Award Altaveu "Best Album" for granada (2014)
- Album of the year for the magazine Rockdelux for granada (2014)
- Award Rolling Stone Spain "Best group/soloist of the year" for granada (2014)
- ABC, #1 National Record of 2017
- Time Out Award for Best Album of 2017
- Rockdelux #1 Video, #1 Album, #1 Artist of 2017
- Ruido de la Prensa Award for Best Spanish Disc of 2017
- Nominated in the UK Music Video Awards 17 in the category "Best styling in a video in association with i-d" with the video "De Plata" from the album "Rosalía – Los Ángeles" (2017)
- Nominated in the 18th Annual Latin Grammy Awards in the category "Best New Artist" with the project "Rosalía – Los Ángeles" (2017)
- Premi Gaudí: "Best original score" for Entre dos aguas, by Isaki Lacuesta (2018)
- Nominated in the "Les Victoires du Jazz 2020" in the category "Best World Music Album" with the project "Lina_Raül Refree – Lina_Raül Refree" (2020)
- Award "German Critic Quarter Award" for the Best Worldmusic Album (2020)
- Grammy Latino 2020, Mejor Álbum Vocal Pop: Ricky Martin - Pausa
- Grammy Latino 2021, Mejor ingeniería de grabación para un álbum: El madrileño
- Gaudí Award 2022 for best soundtrack for "Un año, una noche", by Isaki Lacuesta
- Feroz 23 Awards Nomination for Best Original Score forUn año, una noche, by Isaki Lacuesta
- Nomination for the 2023 Alícia Awards, for Un año, una noche, by Isaki Lacuesta
- Muyeres, Golden Goblet Awards: Jury Grand Prix, SIFF ( 25h Shanghai International Film Festival, 2023)
- Festival Cinespaña 2023: Award Meilleurs Musique for Muyeres
- Award Academia de la Música de España for Best Álbum BSO (2024): La Mesías BSO (Movistar Sound, 2023)
