= La bola negra (soundtrack) =

2026 film soundtrack album

La bola negra (Original Motion Picture Soundtrack)

Film score by Raül Refree
- Released: 16 October 2026
- Recorded: 2026
- Studio: Vienna Synchron Stage
- Genre: Film score
- Length: 62:26
- Label: Lakeshore
- Producer: Raül Refree

Raül Refree chronology
San Paolo di Galatina (2026)	La bola negra (2026)

La bola negra (Original Motion Picture Soundtrack) is the soundtrack album to the 2026 film La bola negra directed by Javier Calvo and Javier Ambrossi (credited as Los Javis). The original soundtrack featured film score composed by Raül Refree and songs performed by María Terremoto, Penélope Cruz and the lead actor Guitarricadelafuente. The soundtrack was released through Lakeshore Records on 16 October 2026.

== Background ==
Raül Refree composed the film score and wrote few original songs. He recalled that Los Javis asked them to write some music in advance so that they could listen to them for inspiration while writing the script. Much of their initial compositions had been used as temp tracks and they were utilized in the film score.

While scoring the film, Refree wanted to pursue a "timeless, orchestral and avant-garde sound" as the score was "intense" grew with the film and its characters. Refree tied the instrumentation to the characters rather than the period the film is set in. Sebastián (Guitarricadelafuente) played the trumpet, hence his sequence relied on the brass section; Carlos (Milo Quifes) played the piano, so his music featured piano and strings. Alberto's (Carlos González) portions set in the present day, and because of him undergoing personal crisis, his music relied more on silence.

The score was recorded at the Vienna Synchron Stage, which focused heavily on horns and woodwinds while the string section complimented the orchestra despite its involvement in specific standalone pieces. Refree was highly impressed with the efficiency of the musicians, noting that the orchestra delivered a "perfect take" by the second attempt.

Besides acting, Guitarricadelafuente performed and co-wrote the tune "La nieve" with Refree, that features in a scene late in the film. Guitarricadelafuente admitted that Los Javis proposed him to write an original song, when they auditioned him for the role and he had no idea where to start having not seen the script. But he eventually ended up writing the tune after he read the script and emphasized with the character. Judeline, who also debuted as an actress in the film, performed a version of "Soldadito español" for the film's score. The trailer features an arrangement by Refree and Pablo Lluch reinterpreting Camarón de la Isla's "La leyenda del tiempo", which in turn sets to music a poem by García Lorca. María Terremoto provides vocals for a seguiriya.

== Release ==
The original song "La Nueve" was released as a single on 16 September 2026. The original soundtrack featuring 24 songs was published under Lakeshore Records on 16 October 2026.

== Track listing ==
No.	Title	Music	Length
1.	"Se han equivocado"	Raül Refree	0:41
2.	"El río"	Raül Refree	0:51
3.	"Las tres"	Raül Refree	2:50
4.	"Las cinco"	Raül Refree	1:15
5.	"Votación"	Raül Refree	1:58
6.	"Sonata del corazón sordo"	Raül Refree	1:43
7.	"Polca de los desamparados"	Raül Refree	2:33
8.	"Que se disculpen"	Raül Refree	1:07
9.	"Enfermería"	Raül Refree	2:48
10.	"Seguiriya de los valientes"	Raül Refree, María Terremoto	3:09
11.	"Calle Santos"	Raül Refree	2:17
12.	"¡Que escapa!"	Raül Refree	2:03
13.	"Tren e incendio"	Raül Refree	3:29
14.	"Las tardes del Ritz"	Raül Refree, Penélope Cruz	4:06
15.	"Los zapatos"	Raül Refree	2:48
16.	"Batallón de modistillas"	Raül Refree, Penélope Cruz	2:42
17.	"Fuegos y bengalas"	Raül Refree	3:10
18.	"Mis padres se llaman Lucio y María"	Raül Refree	2:26
19.	"El pueblo quiere sangre"	Raül Refree	3:09
20.	"En España empieza a amanecer"	Raül Refree	1:32
21.	"Minuet del llanto"	Raül Refree	0:43
22.	"La nieve"	Guitarricadelafuente	4:04
23.	"Mira que nos acechan"	Raül Refree	5:22
24.	"Mira que nos acechan (Piano solo)"	Raül Refree	5:40
Total length:			62:26

== Additional music ==
Other songs featured in the film include the version of "Soldadito español", due for a later release, "Ginomai Andras" and "Giati Foumaro Kokaini" by Roza Eskenazi, "La hija de Juan Simón" by Angelillo, "Hello" by Martin Solveig & Dragonette, "Tubthumping" by Chumbawamba, "Las castigadoras, schotis" by Orquesta Betoré, and "Mi querer es como el hierro" and "Danza (Acto II) de la ópera La vida breve" by Manuel de Falla.

== Reception ==
Adam Mars-Jones of The Spectator wrote "Raul Refree's score, for instance, is not only intrusive but bewildering, churning through moods and instrumental combinations (horn and flute, solo piano tinkles, braying brass) faster than anything that develops on screen." Brian Tallerico of RogerEbert.com called it "a swooping, moving score from Raul Refree". Noah Goldstein of The Arts Fuse wrote "Raúl Refree's colossal score swell[s] into spectacle". Wenlei Ma of The Nightly called it a "textured score by Raul Refree". Lee Marshall of Screen International wrote "swelling orchestral soundtrack [...] which goes all in on the brass and the kettle drums – is just one of the old-school elements of an intensely cinematic film".

== Accolades ==
In August 2026, the team submitted the song "La Nieve" for consideration in the Academy Award for Best Original Song category at the 99th Academy Awards. Refree's score was also a possible contender for Academy Award for Best Original Score.

Award	Date of ceremony	Category	Nominee(s)	Result	Ref.
Hollywood Music in Media Awards	18 November 2026	Best Original Score – Independent Film	Raül Refree	Pending	
Hollywood Music in Media Awards	18 November 2026	Best Original Song – Independent Film	"La Nieve" – Raül Refree, Guitarricadelafuente and Lucas Duran	Pending	
