= Romance of Flamenca =

13th-century anonymous romance

Flamenca (Occitan pronunciation: [flaˈmeŋka]) is a 13th-century anonymous romance, written in the Occitan language in Occitania. Most literary allusions in the text are from Old French sources.

== Authorship ==
The author of Flamenca has not been identified; whether the "Sir Bernadet" in the text refers to the author's actual identity remains unknown. The author was probably not a minstrel, but rather a cleric, most likely in the service of the Roquefeuil family at the court of Alga, and may have written the romance at the Benedictine monastery at Nant, Aveyron, and was erudite and may have even studied at the University of Paris. The author was probably a native of Rouergue, based on linguistic similarities in the language used in the romance and that of the region.

== Plot synopsis ==
The beginning and the end of the manuscript are missing (in addition to a few pages that are also missing); the story begins with the count Guy of Nemours (father of Flamenca) who consults his vassals to decide whether to marry his daughter Flamenca either to the King of the Slavs or to Archambaut of Bourbon, a lord of great value. In fact, he does not want her to marry the distant king because he is afraid of not being able to see Flamenca again. The mother of Flamenca approves of this choice and the wedding is celebrated for many days after which Archambaut returns to Bourbon where a tournament will take place and the King of France will attend. During this tournament, everyone admires the exceptional beauty of Flamenca.

Suddenly, the Queen of France, who sees her husband's spear covered with a cloth given as a sign of love, as is done during the tournament, becomes jealous to the point of suspecting Flamenca and telling Archambaut, who, in turn, begins to be jealous, and the jealousy increases. King and seeks to honor it by staying close to Flamenca and also by the exceptional nature of the beauty of Flamenca.

At the end of the tournament, Archambaut is so jealous that he falls into a fit: he throws all his thoughts towards his jealousy, he abandons all his past honorable activities, he grabs his feet, he does not wash himself anymore, he accuses Flamenca of infidelity and finally, imprisons Flamenca inside a tower with two ladies-in-waiting: Alis and Margarida. He lets her out only for mass (where she remains studied and in contact not only with the chaplain at the time of communion) and, from time to time, to go to the bathroom, where she also remains stuck with her two ladies-in-waiting.

Guilhem de Nivers, a young knight physically, intellectually and morally perfect (he is strong, but also educated and instructed and knowledgeable in the seven liberal arts) is visited in the sauna by Amor who destines him Flamenca. So he went with his squires to Bourbon where he stayed at Pèire Gui's (host who is also the owner of the baths where Archambaut and my Flamenca and his ladies).

Thanks to his generosity, Guilhem becomes friends with Pèire Gui and, together, they go to mass where he sees what Flamenca is studied but also that at the time of giving peace, Nicholas, the clergyman, who approaches him. Love that makes Guilhem smile at the idea of exchanging a word at this moment and digging a basement between the house of Peire Gui and the bathroom.

William therefore proposes (under the pretext of an illness that forces him to stay alone) to rent the whole house for a short time, and, also generous to the chaplain Justin, asks him to let him become the clerk instead of Nicholas (who sends him to study in Paris while paying for his studies). William's intellectual training allows him to easily take this place and he is therefore shaved for love.

It takes the place of the chaplain which gives him the unemployed, at the time of giving peace, not to exchange only a word (actually two syllables) that at the end of many masses and form a conversation, a declaration of love and a plan to meet in the bath thanks to a tunnel; the exchange is as follows: —Wings —What plans. —Muer me. —What? —Of love. —For whom. —For you. "What can I do?" -Cure. —How ? —By none. —Take it. —I took it. "And which one?" —Iretz. "Is it where?" —Also banz. "Cora?" —Short day and people. —I like it.

Between each exchange, with interlocutors who have stopped thinking about the content of their answers and Flamenca talks about it with Alis and Margarida. Meanwhile, Guilhem makes the bricklayers work who in a week and dig the tunnel, once the work is finished, he asks the guests to return to theirs on the pretext that his health is better and that he no longer needs to stay alone in the house of Pèire Gui. From her side, overwhelmed, Flamenca falls into a trance and takes advantage of it to pretend that she is going to the bathroom.

Thus the two lovers meet and enjoy love despite Archambaut's jealousy. Pretending the weakness of his health and the virtues of the baths, Flamenca turns to multiply the accounts. He goes to the bathroom every time for Guilhem's cramp. After a while, he asks her to introduce Alis and Margarida to his two cousins of squires and they all fall in love (Alis and Margarida to Ot and Clarin respectively) and a single couple finds each other in the bathroom.

Paradoxically, it is once he has become truly cooked that he heals himself understanding that out of jealousy he has abandoned all the activities that once honored him and has done a misfortune to Flamenca. He proposes an arrangement or a pact but a page is missing here; on the next page Archambaut returns to his past life abandoning jealousy. Flamenca who can return to his court life is also less likely to find Guilhem in the bathroom. He asks her to go back. The Niverne that capera of military glory in Flanders. Flamenca's father, who dares to speak, tells Archambaut who wants to meet William. With them they participate in a tournament organized in Leuven by the Duke of Brabant and with them they shine (but Archambaut just after William) and they fight in the same field. Archambaut invites William to the tournament he is organizing and William promises to join his field once again.

The last verses are quite comic because out of admiration, attachment and friendship, Archambaut works for the affection of Flamenca and William. First he shows Flamenca a richly wavy poetic greeting that William has given him to instruct him in love. Alis asks ironically if this knight who praises Archambaut so much has a love; who answers that this is called the "dauna of Belmont" and the greeting (in fact written by Flamenca) was vowed. On the occasion of the tournament, Archambaut honors Flamenca and marries Ot and Claris. As he has to choose jewels for three guests, he asks Guilhem, Ot and Claris to choose them for him with the help of Flamenca and leaves them alone; that is how the three couples can enjoy once again.

During the Flamenca tournament he gives his sleeve to the first victorious knight, William; this gives him the unemployed to send the defeated knight beautiful to grant them guards loas arms and money agree to fold the eye before him.

The manuscript ends here and the sequel is missing.

== In popular culture ==
Spanish singer Rosalía based her 2018 album El mal querer on Flamenca. Every song was named after a chapter from the book.

== Sources ==
- Lavaud, René; Nelli, René, eds. (1960), Les Troubadours: Jaufre, Flamenca, Barlaam et Josephat, Bruges: Desclée De Brouwer
- Blodgett, E.D. (1995). The Romance of Flamenca. UK: Routledge. ISBN 0-8240-5169-6.
- Zufferey and Fasseur (eds, trans) (2014). Flamenca. FRA: Le Livre de Poche Lettres Gothiques. ISBN 978-2-253-08256-9.
