= Rocío Márquez =

Spanish Flamenco Singer

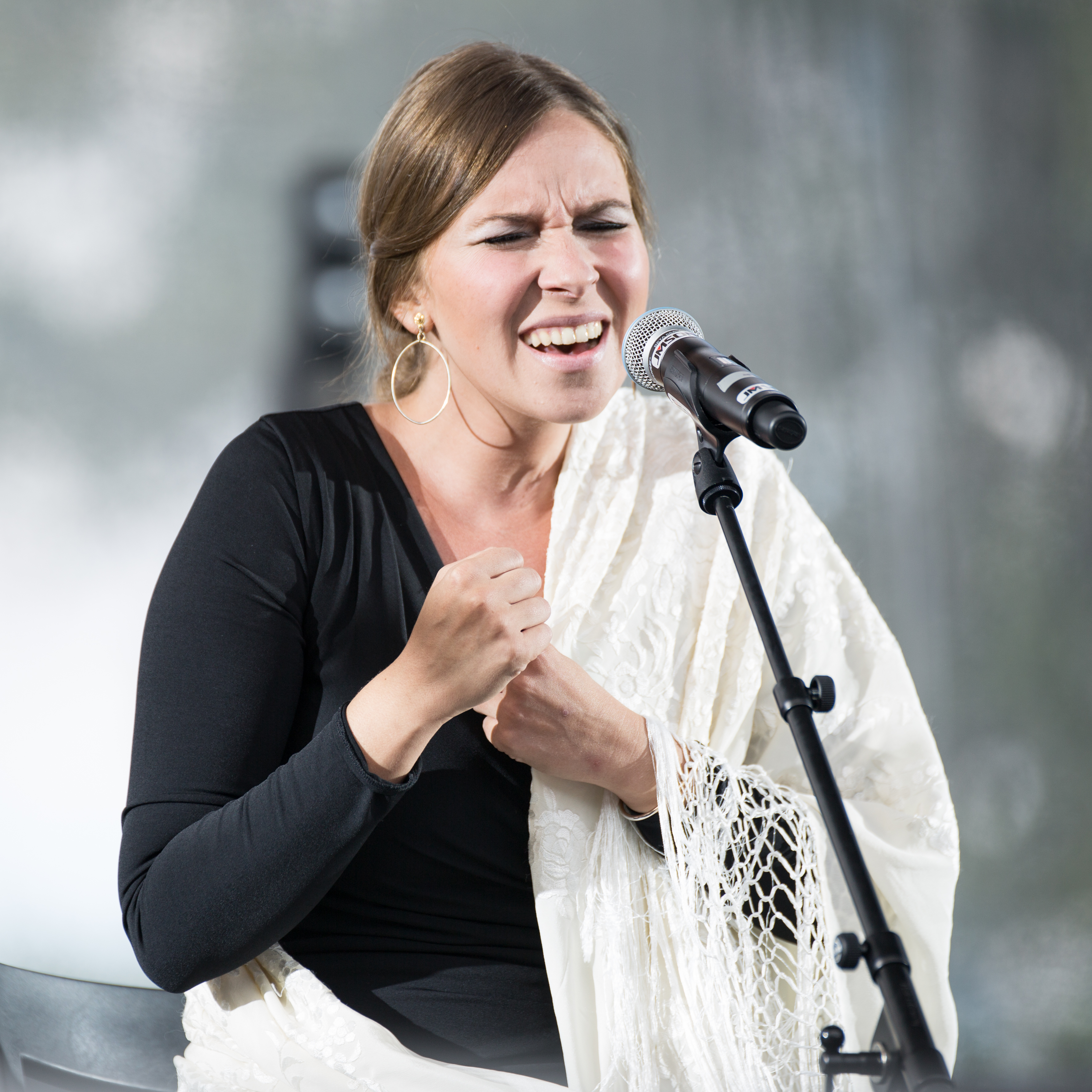
- Rocío Márquez at Rio Loco 2015
- Born: Rocío Márquez Limón; 29 September 1985; Huelva, Andalusia, Kingdom of Spain
- Occupation: Singer
- Years active: 1994–
- Awards: Coups de Coeur from the Académie Charles Cros (2013) “Les Victoires du Jazz” for the Best World Music Album (2020); Ruido Prize (Premio Ruido) for "Tercer Cielo" as best album (with Bronquio) (2022) "Nana a medias" 2nd Carmen Awards, Best Original Song (2023) "Fandango" 4th Carmen Awards, Best Original Song (2025)
- Musical career
- Genre: Flamenco music, Nuevo flamenco
- Instrument: Vocals
- Label: Universal Music Group

Rocío Márquez Limón (Huelva, September 29, 1985), known artistically as Rocío Márquez, is a Spanish flamenco singer, or cantaora.

== Biography ==
From the age of nine, she took flamenco lessons at the Peña Flamenca in Huelva, made her first public appearance at that age. After beginning piano lessons, she appeared on the singing show 'Menudos Estrellas' on the Spanish television channel Antena 3 two years later, securing third place. A few months later, she won first prize in the 'Artistas Noveles' competition organized by the broadcaster COPE. During this period, she took singing lessons in Seville and appeared on several television programs, such as 'Esos locos bajitos' (1998–2005) and 'De buena mañana'.

In 2005, as a scholarship recipient of the Cristina Heeren Foundation, she received instruction from renowned flamenco artists, including José de la Tomasa and Paco Tarento. In 2007, Rocío Márquez achieved notable success at various flamenco festivals, including those in Calasparra, Marchena, Mijas, and Jumilla. In 2008, she captivated audiences at the Las Minas Festival and International Competition in La Unión, where she received the prestigious "Lámpara Minera" award as well as four first-place prizes. In July 2010, she gave her first concert in France at the Les Suds festival in Arles, opening for Diego el Cigala.

Rocío Márquez earned her doctorate from the University of Seville, with a dissertation focusing on "vocal technique in flamenco." She teaches in the inter-university master's program "Research and Analysis of Flamenco" and gives lectures on flamenco singing.

She has performed on many stages in Spain, including the Teatro de la Zarzuela, Teatro Real, and National Auditorium of Music in Madrid; the Teatro Isabel la Católica in Granada; the Palau de la Música de València. Beyond Spain, she has performed at the Olympia in Paris, the Auditorium in Brussels, and the Düsseldorf Opera House. Additionally, she has performed through the Instituto Cervantes in the United States, the Middle East, Argentina, Canada, and numerous European countries.

In 2025, she launched her tour 'Himno Vertical', performing in Spain and Portugal.

== Awards ==
- 2008: Lámpara-minera Prize at the Cante de Las Minas Festival.
- 2013: Coups de Coeur de l’Académie de Charles Cros (Académie Charles Cros) (France, 2013).
- 2016: Giraldillo for Dance
- 2019: Gold medal international competition Petenera
- 2020: “Les Victoires du Jazz” for the “Best World Music Album”
- 2022: Ruido Prize (Premio Ruido) for "Tercer Cielo" as best album (with Bronquio)
- 2023: Nana a medias with Antonio Manuel and Javier Prieto 2nd Carmen Awards, Best Original Song
- 2025: Fandango 4th Carmen Awards, Best Original Song

== Discography ==
- 2009: Aquí y Ahora (DVD, El Séptimo Sello Records)
- 2012: Claridad (Universal)
- 2014: El niño consisting of songs by Pepe Marchena (Universal)
- 2017: Firmamento (Universal)
- 2018: Diálogos de nuevos y viejos sones (Alqhai&Alqhai)
- 2019: Visto en El Jueves (Universal)
- 2020: Omnia Vincit Amor (Digital EP)
- 2022: Flamencos: Falla, Granados & Albéniz with Rosa Torres-Pardo (Marchvivo)
- 2022: Tercer cielo with 'Bronquio' (Universal)
