= Rockdelux =

Spanish music magazine

- Editor: Santi Carrillo
- Categories: Music
- Frequency: Monthly
- First issue: 1 November 1984
- Country: Spain
- Based in: Barcelona
- Language: Spanish
- Website: http://www.rockdelux.com
- ISSN: 1138-2864

Rockdelux is a Spanish music magazine.

== History and profile ==
Rockdelux was first published in November 1984, and celebrated its 200th edition in October 2002, when it released a list of the 200 greatest international albums of all time, according to the magazine's staff. Rockdelux's brief was to serve a specific section of the public who are passionate about music, and its focus was on new and more alternative artists from both Spain and the outside world (termed "international").

It had an extensive review section, covering mainly new musical releases and re-releases, but also covered other music-related subjects such as live concerts and videos and featured reviews of new books and graphic novels. Unlike many other review sections in popular magazines, it eschewed the trend of giving a numerical value to each review, which are purely composed of written text summing up the release's values.

From 1987 Santi Carrillo was the editor-in-chief of the magazine. Rockdelux was the recipient of various awards for music publication of the year from such organisations as Radio 3, Cadena SER and Iberpop amongst others.

In April 1999, Rockdelux began to issue complimentary CDs as a gift with the magazine, each one generally acting as a sampler for a particular record label, such as Warp Records, Fierce Panda Records and Sub Pop records.

The final issue (#394) was published in May 2020. In December 2020, Rockdelux was bought by Primavera Sound, who relaunched the magazine as a digital publication under a subscription model. The magazine is still led by Santi Carrillo, with a reduced original staff.

== See also ==
- List of magazines in Spain
