= Primavera Sound Porto 2023 =

Music festival

- Dates: 7–10 June 2023
- Locations: Parque da Cidade, Porto, Portugal
- Website: www.primaverasound.com/porto

The Primavera Sound Porto 2023 was held on 7 to 10 June 2023 at the Parque da Cidade, Porto, Portugal. The festival was headlined by Kendrick Lamar, Rosalía, Pet Shop Boys, Blur, and Halsey.

== Headlining set lists ==
Wednesday, 7 June 2023

Kendrick Lamar
1. "N95"
2. "Element"
3. "A.D.H.D"
4. "King Kunta"
5. "Worldwide Steppers"
6. "Nosetalgia"
7. "Backseat Freestyle"
8. "M.A.A.D City"
9. "Swimming Pools (Drank)"
10. "Loyalty"
11. "Purple Hearts"
12. "DNA"
13. "Rich Spirit"
14. "Humble"
15. "Sidewalks"
16. "Count Me Out"
17. "Money Trees"
18. "Bitch, Don't Kill My Vibe"
19. "Die Hard"
20. "Love"
21. "Family Ties" with Baby Keem
22. "Alright"
23. "Savior"

Thursday, 8 June 2023

Rosalía
1. "Saoko"
2. "Bizcochito"
3. "La Fama"
4. "De aquí no sales"/"Bulerías"
5. "La Noche de Anoche"
6. "Linda"
7. "Diablo"
8. "Despechá"
9. "Hentai"
10. "Candy"
11. "Motomami"
12. "La combi versace"
13. "Beso"
14. "Vampiros"
15. "Con Altura"
16. "Héroe"
17. "Malamente"
18. "Chicken Teriyaki"
19. "CUUUUuuuuuute"

Friday, 9 June 2023

Pet Shop Boys
1. "Suburbia"
2. "Can You Forgive Her?"
3. "Opportunities (Let's Make Lots of Money)"
4. "Where the Streets Have No Name (I Can't Take My Eyes Off You)"
5. "Rent"
6. "I Don't Know What You Want but I Can't Give It Any More"
7. "So Hard"
8. "Left to My Own Devices"
9. "Domino Dancing"
10. "Love Comes Quickly"
11. "Paninaro"
12. "Always on My Mind"
13. "Dreamland"
14. "Heart"
15. "It's Alright"
16. "Vocal"
17. "Go West"
18. "It's a Sin"

Encore

19. "West End Girls"
20. "Being Boring"

Saturday, 10 June 2023

Blur
1. "St Charles Square"
2. "There's No Other Way"
3. "Popscene"
4. "Tracy Jacks"
5. "Beetlebum"
6. "Trimm Trabb"
7. "Villa Rosie"
8. "Coffee & TV"
9. "End of a Century"
10. "Country House"
11. "Parklife"
12. "To the End"
13. "Sing"
14. "Girls & Boys"
15. "Advert"
16. "Song 2"
17. "This Is a Low"
18. "Tender"
19. "The Narcissist"
20. "The Universal"
Halsey
1. "Nightmare"
2. "Castle"
3. "Easier than Lying"
4. "You Should Be Sad"
5. "Graveyard"
6. "Colors"
7. "Eastside"
8. "The Lighthouse"
9. "honey"
10. "Bad at Love"
11. "3am"
12. "Closer"
13. "Gasoline"
14. "Experiment on Me"
15. "Without Me"
16. "I Am Not a Woman, I'm a God"

== Lineup ==
Headline performers are listed in boldface. Artists listed from latest to earliest set times.

=== Palco Porto ===
| Wednesday, 7 June 2023 | Thursday, 8 June 2023 | Friday, 9 June 2023 | Saturday, 10 June 2023 |
|---|---|---|---|
| **Kendrick Lamar**; Baby Keem; Alison Goldfrapp (Note: FKA Twigs was supposed to perform but cancelled. She was replaced by Alison Goldfrapp.); Beatriz Pessoa | **Rosalía**; The Mars Volta; Arlo Parks; Núria Graham; Fumo Ninja | Central Cee; **Pet Shop Boys**; My Morning Jacket; Deixem O Pimba em Paz | **Blur**; **Halsey**; Sparks; Yard Act; Wolf Manhattan |

=== Palco Vodafone ===
| Wednesday, 7 June 2023 | Thursday, 8 June 2023 | Friday, 9 June 2023 | Saturday, 10 June 2023 |
|---|---|---|---|
| ¥///0 $#£[[ //&$ #£>3; The Comet Is Coming; Holly Humberstone; Georgia | Mora; Fred again..; Maggie Rogers; Shellac; Quadra | Darkside; St. Vincent; NxWorries (Anderson .Paak × Knxwledge); Wednesday; Meta | Unwound; New Order; Karate; Israel Fernández y Diego del Morao; Unsafe Space Garden |

=== Palco Super Bock ===
| Thursday, 8 June 2023 | Friday, 9 June 2023 | Saturday, 10 June 2023 |
|---|---|---|
| Bad Religion; Japanese Breakfast; Alvvays; The Beths | Le Tigre; Rema; Pusha T; Terno Rei | Marina Herlop; Yves Tumor; Nation of Language; Isa Leen |

=== Palco Plenitude ===
| Thursday, 8 June 2023 | Friday, 9 June 2023 | Saturday, 10 June 2023 |
|---|---|---|
| Jockstrap; Gilla Band; Gaz Coombes; The Murder Capital; Surf Curse | Tokischa; Self Esteem; Built to Spill; Blondshell; Margarida Campelo | Drain Gang; Off!; Julia Holter; Flowerovlove; PUP |

=== Palco Bits ===
| Thursday, 8 June 2023 | Friday, 9 June 2023 | Saturday, 10 June 2023 |
|---|---|---|
| VTSS B2B Lsdxoxo; Teki Latex; UNIIQU3; Gazzi | Jayda G; Marcellus Pittman; Shannen SP B2B Joe Cotch; King Kami | Daphni; Nick León; Verraco; Isabella Lovestory; Chima Isaaro |
