= Motomami World Tour =

2022 concert tour by Rosalía

- Transcontinental tour by Rosalía
- Location: Europe; North America; South America
- Associated album: Motomami
- Start date: 6 July 2022
- End date: 18 December 2022
- Legs: 4
- No. of shows: 46
- Attendance: 440,000
- Box office: $30,4 million

Rosalía concert chronology
- El Mal Querer Tour (2019); Motomami World Tour (2022); Lux Tour (2026)

The Motomami World Tour was the third concert tour by Spanish singer Rosalía in support of her third studio album, Motomami (2022). Led by Live Nation Entertainment, the tour was officially announced on 18 April 2022. It began on 6 July 2022 in Almería, Spain, and concluded on 18 December 2022 in Paris, France, visiting cities in Europe, Latin America and North America throughout 46 dates.

The tour was both a commercial and critical success. It received positive reviews from critics and fans, who complimented the immersive stage design and setlist. The Motomami World Tour was attended by 440,000 people and grossed $30,4 million, surpassing her previous concert tour, the El Mal Querer Tour, as her highest-grossing tour to date. It became the tenth best performing female concert tour of the year worldwide.

== Background ==
Rosalía released her third studio album Motomami on 18 March 2022. The alternative reggaeton album became Rosalía's first major LP release after the international recognition El Mal Querer brought her. It was a critical and commercial success, charting in many countries, including the United Kingdom and the United States, reaching the top 40. Tour manager Agustín Boffi had previously revealed during the Bime Pro music conference in Bilbao in October 2021 that Rosalía would embark on a "world tour in 2022" that had been prepared "for over a year". Boffi also revealed that the tour crew would be expanded to "over 150 people" compared to the 40 people that were working on her previous concert cycle. Initial rehearsals reportedly started in January 2022 while dancing practices began in April in Barcelona. Final rehearsals were held at Sant Jordi Club, where a private show was held for a dozen of selected fans on 2 July.

The tour was first announced with 44 dates in April 2022 with tickets going on sale for North American fans on 21 April for American Express cardholders, and for European fans the following day. The tour started in Almería, Spain on 6 July 2022, and conclude in Paris on 18 December 2022. Additional shows were announced in Barcelona, Los Angeles, Madrid and New York City. Due to overwhelming demand, the São Paulo concert was moved from the Tokio Marine Hall to Espaço Unimed, a double-sized venue. Additional shows in Mexico City and Buenos Aires were announced, respectively in April and May. No opening acts were announced, although the concerts in Buenos Aires and Santiago had theirs announced the day before each show.

== Stage and aesthetic ==
Rosalía wore costumes from Dion Lee and Pepa Salazar on stage. She enlisted long-time friend Ferran Echegaray and sister Pilar Vila as artistic directors and production designers and Jesse Blevins from Barcelonian company Fluge Audiovisuales as lighting director. The design concept is based on Harold Rosenberg's idea of a white canvas to be filled within the abstract expressionism movement and the defense of the performance. The tour stage is composed of a white cyclorama and two vertical 7,5x9 meter, 4,8mm pitch screens on both sides that accompany a 20-meter-long runway (only in shows performed in indoor arenas) that loops around an audience pit. Lightning equipment primarily consists of two Lancelot HTI 4000 by Robert Juliat located on the top part of the stage, above the runway. The sound system is confected of 112 Meyer Sound loudspeakers, 62 on the public address system, 6 on the downfill, 16 on the frontfill and 28 on the outfill. The stage for the Motomami Tour was reportedly constructed in the United States with a cost over half-a-million euros.

The stage design is intended to deliver a "minimalistic" and "immersive" experience incorporating the motorcycle aesthetic of the record. The on-stage activity, which pretends to approximate every single audience member to the stage through mobile cameras handed by the performer and a selected amount of dancers. In resemblance to her Motomami Live TikTok concert that took place on 17 March, six Panasonic PT-RZ31K cameras, if not a steadicam, follow Rosalía during a major part of the show, projecting what happens onstage on both screens in a TikTok-ish recording manner, also enriching the experience of visualizing the concert from the grandstand. The presence of a cameraman often sparked controversy. Rosalía later told the Recording Academy that she "figured there had to be a huge camera to make the audience feel. I understand people expected fireworks, but the craziest thing for me is dancing and expressing myself. I'm at a point where I want to put all my effort into having the best voice, put all the best choreography. That's what's important to me".

== Concert synopsis ==
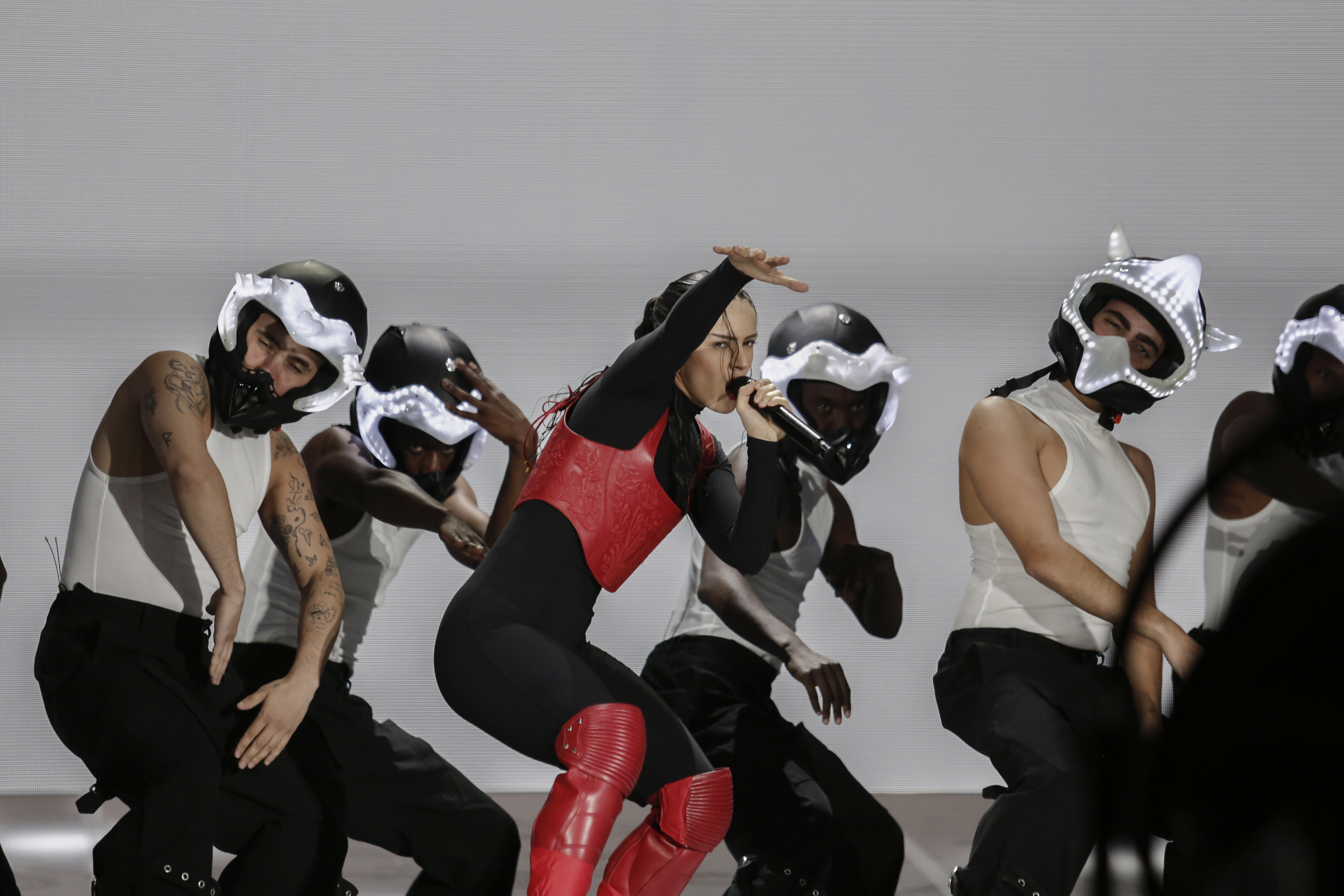
Rosalía opening with "Saoko"

As the audience enters the venue before the start of the show, a progressive Bic pen drawing inspired by the Motomami artwork is projected on the stage while a playlist of selected songs plays in the background, including "Another Brick in the Wall, Part 2" by Pink Floyd, "Obsesión" by Aventura, "Fiebre" by Bad Gyal, "Loco por Perrearte (Remix)" by De La Ghetto and Rauw Alejandro, among others. Three minutes before shutting down the venue's lights, "Matsuri-Shake", an experimental punk song by Japanese all-girl band Ni Hao is played. Once obscure, loud motorcycle noises emerge from the loudspeakers while smoke comes out of the stage's extremes. Rosalía and her dance crew (popularly known as 'motopapis') enter from behind the screen shortly after, wearing a white neon full face motorcycle helmet. Rosalía soon reveals herself and performs an extended version of "Saoko", followed by "Candy" immediately after. During the performance, with her entirely-male dancing formation running around Rosalía in circles.

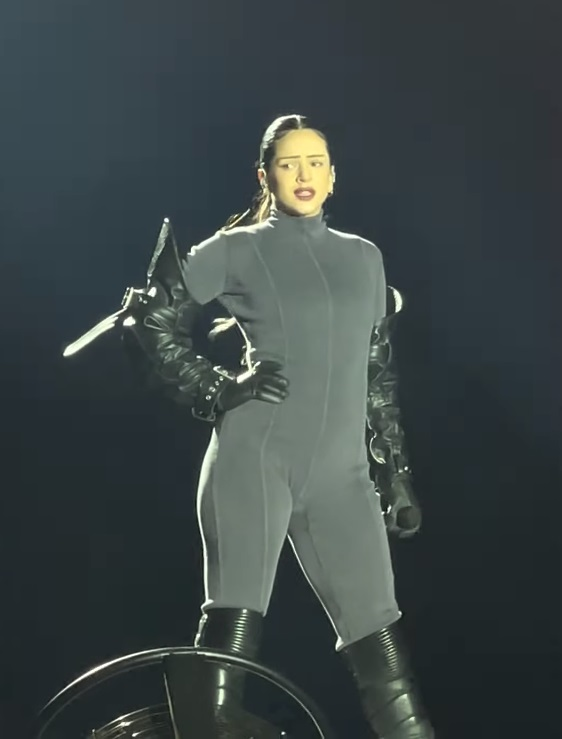
Rosalía chews fake gum while performing "Bizcochito"

During "Bizcochito", Rosalía walks to the end of the runway and makes a "sassy" fake chewing gum face that became viral on TikTok. A high-pitch voice distorter is used on the singer's vocals at the end. An extended solo version of lead single "La Fama" similar to the one used in her performance on Saturday Night Live, starts playing while Rosalía puts on a pair of sunglasses. Rosalía picks up a guitar and interacts with the audience for the first time during a speech that precedes "Dolerme". During the performance, a blue floodlight shines above the singer and the main screen projects images of moving water. A medley of "De Aquí No Sales" and "Bulerías" comes right after. The former's performance partly recycles that of El Mal Querer Tour while the latter features an avant-flamenco outro that was already spotted on her Motomami Live virtual concert. The 'motopapis' form a human motorcycle during an extended version of the Pharrell-produced "Motomami". The show continues with Rosalía being transferred by two of her dancers (making the form of a crux immissa) to a spinning platform to sing the emotional "G3 N15". The show goes on with "Linda", the first of two collaborations with Tokischa. In this is heavily choreographed performance, the lateral screens show direct images from the stage through mobile cameras handed by dancers Jaxon Willard and Stanley Glover.

Rosalía walks down to the public with yet another mobile camera during "La Noche de Anoche", encouraging her followers to sing the track on her microphone while live recording them. A camera operator using a steadicam accompanies Rosalía during "Diablo", where she sits on a barber chair, removes her makeup with a white towel and cuts her hair extensions in a performance that resembles Cut Piece, a pioneer of performance art first performed by Yoko Ono in 1964. Rosalía whistles and plays a black classical piano during "Hentai" while the main screen projects a green landscape similar to Charles O'Rear's Bliss, that slowly sees sunset, followed by a shortened version of "Pienso en tu Mirá". A "nude" version of La Factoría and Eddy Lover's 2007 song "Perdóname" is performed immediately after.

A twenty-meter-long black skirt "wraps" the singer's waist during a revamped electric and Spanish guitar-driven performance of "De Plata", the only song of her debut album Los Ángeles to be included in the setlist. Rosalía asks the audience to collaborate with her completing the alphabet during "Abcdefg", in which each mentioned letter is projected on the screen. She later lies on the floor and starts singing "La Combi Versace" in another heavily choreographed performance. The show smoothly transitions to a purple reggaeton party that starts the remixed version of Sech's "Relación" and is followed by the Travis Scott collaboration "TKN", incorporating elements of Lorna's "Papi Chulo". Rosalía brings approximately twenty fans on stage to dance along to "Yo x Ti, Tu x Mi" and "Gasolina" by Daddy Yankee before singing a shortened version of "Despechá". Rosalia sings about vulnerability and her struggles with fame and paparazzi on "Aislamiento" which eventually collapses in synthesizers and transitions to the remixed version of the Weeknd's "Blinding Lights", followed by "Chiri". Vulnerability strikes again during "Como Un G", which starts with Rosalía on her knees. The following performance, "Malamente", features Rosalía's dancers running around in a new choreography routine.

"LAX", in which Rosalía sings about her fears of stardom, serves as the show's first and only interlude, with its lyrics written by a Bic pen being projected on the central screen as they're sung. Lightning turns orange and a mic stand is used during "Delirio de Grandeza". Rosalía later laments that the show is nearly coming to an end and proceeds to perform "Con Altura", with the crew leaving the stage after its end. After a few minutes, the encore begins with the dancers riding scooters as the first chords of "Chicken Teriyaki" start playing, after which pianist Llorenç Barceló comes onstage during "Sakura", which Rosalía sings in an almost theatrical way. Jal Joshua walks the runway during a twenty-one-number countdown with Rosalía appearing shortly after to sing an extended version of "CUUUUuuuuuute" before leaving the stage. The song "ハピネス" by Japanese musician Sekitō Shigeo is played over the public address system as the audience leaves the venue; the recording is an instrumental version of "Happiness is Me and You" by Gilbert O'Sullivan.

== Critical reception ==
=== Spain ===
The tour received positive-to-mixed reviews from critics during its first leg. Nuria Net from Rolling Stone gave the first show at Madrid a positive review, stating that "On this Motomami Tour, it's all about minimalism and showcaszing her raw talent, but it's also loud and eclectic. In the cover image of the acclaimed album, Rosalía appears naked except for a motorcycle helmet. During her live show, she bares it all even more". About the stage design, she added: "the immersive experience is translated to the stage by a cameraperson who could very well have been the ninth 'motopapi' dancer, hovering constantly around Rosalía, even standing right in front of her and blocking her from front view. But that's the point." Writing for El País, Fernando Neira wrote a controversial paper about the same show, in which he questioned the "camera-focused" type of spectacle by calling Rosalía a "walking selfie" performing a "televised karaoke" while also talking poorly about the record. Neira's words were widely criticized by fans and specialized outlets including Forbes, ElDiario.es, and singer Alaska, who called Neira "absurd" and stated that the show "is a full 21st century spectacle" while also comparing it to recent live performances by Kiss and C. Tangana. Jenesaispop's Sebas Alonso gave the tour a positive review, rating the show with an 8/10. The portal highlighted the "futuristic" yet "minimalistic" aspects of the show stating that "Rosalía is always two steps ahead (...) she's already thinking about what's next. There are no artists in this world interested in looking back at 2019", praising the show not relying on the "glorification of the 80s or 90s" by betting on a "new way to perform and to interact, with no costume changes or kilometrical cranes".

=== North America ===
The North American leg of the tour received positive reviews from critics. Maura Johnston from The Boston Globe, who attended the tour's first stop in the United States, called Rosalía's set a "wildly energetic, yet utterly human" one that "proved that she's a pop force in full command of herself to be reckoned with, and that she's only beginning to write her legacy". Consequence of Sound and Edge covered both concerts in New York City, coinciding that "Rosalía is a leading figure in Latin music". Chris Richards wrote an outstanding review of the only show in the District of Columbia for The Washington Post. Calling Rosalía "a polyglot with a paralyzing voice" performing a "syncretic masterstroke" record by "positing her curiosity as tenacity, her meticulousness as virtuosity", Richards described the show as "hyperreal" stating that "this wasn't your everyday information-age maximalist popstuff. It wasn't worldly mood boarding. It wasn't trend forecasting, or klepto flossing or tea leaf browsing. This was something far more intimate, something futuristic and precious, and inextricably so a new kind of pop music that seems fully aware of life's unfathomable breadth, as well as the fact that we're each given only so much future to live. About the shows in California, Riff and USD The Guardian called it "a solid representation of the cathartic soundscape of the album, where the songs slam back and forth between chaos and calm, old and new, rigid and soft, much like the nature of her artistry".

=== Europe ===
The European leg of the tour received positive reviews from critics. Hannah Mylrea from NME and The Independent gave the show in Lisbon a five-star perfect review. They coincided that "rapidly switching from soaring ballads to industrial club moments, this show is a demonstration of Rosalía's singular artistic vision. Encompassing the genre-shifting nature of Motomami and allowing each of the record's sides to shine in equal measure –be that with a complex dance routine, or a tear-jerking moment of catharsis– it's indicative of Rosalía's sheer talent as a performer, and a reminder that nobody is doing it quite like her at the moment".

The London stop at The O_{2} Arena was widely acclaimed by British media outlets. Metro called Rosalía "music's greatest living collagists" as "a textural auteur who appears to fold in every sound and taste, culture and country she's ever experienced into her own extremely complicated and dynamic universe." Evening Standard and The Telegraph coincided that Rosalía is "one of the greatest performers it has ever been their privilege to see and hear". Charles Ravens wrote for The Guardian that Rosalía is "pop's fearless queen" conjuring "a kaleidoscopic paradise" and compared her to "Frank Ocean with twice as hits", "Björk with dance routines" and "Kanye West with a personality transplant".

The solo tour stops were attended by many celebrities and public personalities such as Queen Letizia, Frank Ocean, M.I.A, Drake, Dua Lipa, Pedro Pascal, Robert Pattinson, Kylie Jenner, Kendall Jenner, Bella Hadid, Shawn Mendes, Pedro Almodóvar, Rossy de Palma, Suki Waterhouse, Emily Ratajkowski, Danna Paola, Zara Larsson, Julieta Venegas, Angèle, Simon Jacquemus, Nicki Nicole, Addison Rae, Estopa, Pabllo Vittar, Ludmilla, Carlos Cuevas, Amaia, Tokischa, Carminho and Rauw Alejandro.

== Commercial performance ==
The Motomami World Tour was attended by 440,000 people and grossed $30.4 million from 45 shows, surpassing her previous concert tour, the El Mal Querer Tour, as her highest-grossing tour to date. It became the tenth best performing female concert tour of the year worldwide, and the second best-performing female tour by a Spanish-singing act after Karol G's Strip Love Tour.

== Setlist ==
The following setlist was obtained from the 9 July 2022 concert, held at the Estadio de La Cartuja in Seville, Spain. It does not represent all concerts for the duration of the tour.

1. "Saoko"
2. "Candy"
3. "Bizcochito"
4. "La Fama"
5. "Dolerme"
6. "De aquí no sales" / "Bulerías"
7. "Motomami"
8. "G3 N15"
9. "Linda"
10. "La Noche de Anoche"
11. "Diablo"
12. "Hentai"
13. "Pienso en tu mirá"
14. "Perdóname" (La Factoría and Eddy Lover cover)
15. "De Plata"
16. "Abcdefg" (interlude)
17. "La Combi Versace"
18. "Relación (remix)" / "TKN" / "Yo x ti, tu x mi" / "Despechá" (contains elements of "Papi Chulo" and "Gasolina")
19. "Aislamiento"
20. "Blinding Lights (remix)"
21. "Chiri"
22. "Como un G"
23. "Malamente"
24. "LAX" (interlude)
25. "Delirio de grandeza"
26. "Con altura"

Encore

27. "Chicken Teriyaki"
28. "Sakura"
29. "Cuuuuuuuuuute"

=== Notes ===
- During the first show in Barcelona, Rosalía sang an acapella version of "Milionària" in the course of "Abcdefg".
- During the concert in Braga, Rosalía sang an acapella cover of "Escrevi Teu Nome no Vento" by Portuguese fado singer Carminho.
- During the concert in São Paulo, Rosalía performed an acapella cover of "Você Vai Ver" by Tom Jobim.
- During the concerts in Buenos Aires, Rosalía performed an acapella cover of "Alfonsina y el mar" by Mercedes Sosa after reading a sign from a fan in the audience on the first night.
- During the concert in Santiago, Rosalía performed an acapella version of "Catalina" after a request of someone in the audience. The song was performed again at the following shows in Bogotá, La Romana and Berlin.
- During the concert in La Romana, Tokischa joined Rosalía on stage to sing "Linda".
- During the first concert in Inglewood, M.I.A. surprised Rosalía onstage while performing "Yo x Ti, Tu x Mi".
- During the concert in Almería, "LAX" was not performed.
- During the concerts in Granada, Fuengirola, the first one in Madrid and the second one in Mexico City, "De plata" was not performed.
- During the concert in Palma, Rosalía did not perform "Perdóname", "De plata", "Delirio de grandeza", "Chicken Teriyaki" and "Sakura" due to an illness.
- During the concert in Miami, "Dolerme", "Diablo", "Pienso en tu Mirá", "Perdóname", "De Plata", "Abcdefg", "Aislamiento", "Blinding Lights", "Chiri", "Como Un G" and "Sakura" were not performed.

== Shows ==
List of concerts showing date, city, country, venue, opening acts, tickets sold, number of available tickets and amount of gross revenue
Date	City	Country	Venue	Opening acts	Attendance	Revenue
Europe
6 July 2022	Almería	Spain	Recinto Ferial	—N/a	6,969 / 8,483	$476,698
9 July 2022	Seville	Spain	Estadio de La Cartuja	—N/a	15,254 / 18,758	$991,360
12 July 2022	Granada	Spain	Plaza de Toros	—N/a	7,442 / 7,442	$506,814
14 July 2022	Fuengirola	Spain	Marenostrum Music Castle	—N/a	12,364 / 15,982	$793,165
16 July 2022	Valencia	Spain	Auditorio Marina Sur	—N/a	15,357 / 17,919	$1,107,086
19 July 2022	Madrid	Spain	WiZink Center	—N/a	30,202 / 30,202	$2,044,525
20 July 2022	Madrid	Spain	WiZink Center	—N/a	30,202 / 30,202	$2,044,525
23 July 2022	Barcelona	Spain	Palau Sant Jordi	—N/a	35,490 / 35,490	$2,263,939
24 July 2022	Barcelona	Spain	Palau Sant Jordi	—N/a	35,490 / 35,490	$2,263,939
27 July 2022	Bilbao	Spain	Bizkaia Arena	—N/a	13,599 / 16,114	$903,305
29 July 2022	A Coruña	Spain	Coliseum da Coruña	—N/a	7,988 / 7,988	$516,687
1 August 2022	Palma	Spain	Son Fusteret	—N/a	8,999 / 8,999	$636,564
Latin America
14 August 2022	Mexico City	Mexico	Auditorio Nacional	—N/a	19,161 / 19,161	$1,235,436
15 August 2022	Mexico City	Mexico	Auditorio Nacional	—N/a	19,161 / 19,161	$1,235,436
17 August 2022	Zapopan	Mexico	Auditorio Telmex	—N/a	7,902 / 7,943	$628,737
19 August 2022	Monterrey	Mexico	Auditorio Citibanamex	—N/a	6,668 / 6,679	$573,034
22 August 2022 (Note: The concert on 22 August 2022 in São Paulo was originally set to take place at the Tokio Marine Hall, but it was moved due to high demand.)	São Paulo	Brazil	Espaço Unimed	—N/a	8,594 / 8,594	$607,526
25 August 2022	Buenos Aires	Argentina	Movistar Arena	Bresh	25,740 / 31,001	$1,522,966
26 August 2022	Buenos Aires	Argentina	Movistar Arena	Bresh	25,740 / 31,001	$1,522,966
28 August 2022	Santiago	Chile	Movistar Arena	ICZ	15,506 / 15,506	$795,162
31 August 2022	Bogotá	Colombia	Movistar Arena	—N/a	10,732 / 11,384	$594,775
3 September 2022	La Romana	Dominican Republic	Altos De Chavón	—N/a	5,796 / 5,796	$460,747
9 September 2022	San Juan	Puerto Rico	José Miguel Agrelot Coliseum	—N/a	12,283 / 13,593	$897,410
North America
15 September 2022	Boston	United States	MGM Music Hall at Fenway	—N/a	4,652 / 4,916	$400,989
18 September 2022	New York City	United States	Radio City Music Hall	—N/a	11,544 / 11,544	$1,224,263
19 September 2022	New York City	United States	Radio City Music Hall	—N/a	11,544 / 11,544	$1,224,263
23 September 2022	Toronto	Canada	Budweiser Stage	—N/a	7,667 / 8,871	$542,478
26 September 2022	Washington, D.C.	United States	The Anthem	—N/a	6,000 / 6,000	$553,258
28 September 2022	Chicago	United States	Byline Bank Aragon Ballroom	—N/a	4,901 / 4,901	$402,201
2 October 2022	San Diego	United States	CalCoast Credit Union Open Air Theatre	—N/a	4,720 / 4,720	$500,930
4 October 2022	San Francisco	United States	Bill Graham Civic Auditorium	—N/a	8,507 / 8,507	$765,305
7 October 2022	Inglewood	United States	YouTube Theater	—N/a	11,699 / 11,699	$1,450,359
8 October 2022	Inglewood	United States	YouTube Theater	—N/a	11,699 / 11,699	$1,450,359
12 October 2022	Houston	United States	713 Music Hall	—N/a	5,058 / 5,058	$437,422
14 October 2022	Irving	United States	The Pavilion at Toyota Music Factory	—N/a	5,952 / 8,023	$478,837
17 October 2022	Atlanta	United States	Coca-Cola Roxy	—N/a	3,607 / 3,607	$339,968
22 October 2022 (Note: The concert on 22 October 2022 in Miami was part of the III Points Music, Art, and Technology Festival.)	Miami	United States	MANA Wynwood	—N/a	—N/a	—N/a
Europe
25 November 2022	Braga	Portugal	Altice Forum	—N/a	11,444 / 11,444	$567,766
27 November 2022	Lisbon	Portugal	Altice Arena	—N/a	19,002 / 19,002	$888,048
1 December 2022	Milan	Italy	Mediolanum Forum	—N/a	10,146 / 10,146	$535,363
4 December 2022	Berlin	Germany	Velodrom	—N/a	7,872 / 7,872	$428,310
7 December 2022	Düsseldorf	Germany	Mitsubishi Electric Halle	—N/a	7,187 / 7,187	$398,453
10 December 2022	Amsterdam	Netherlands	AFAS Live	—N/a	6,019 / 6,019	$345,725
12 December 2022	Brussels	Belgium	Forest National	—N/a	8,388 / 8,388	$484,072
15 December 2022	London	England	The O_{2} Arena	—N/a	14,752 / 14,752	$1,083,667
18 December 2022	Paris	France	Accor Arena	—N/a	15,540 / 15,540	$1,048,470
Total					440,703 / 465,230 (94.73%)	$30,431,765

== Personnel ==
Credits adapted from Live Nation.

Show

- Rosalía – Vocals, dancer, electric guitar, piano, creative director
- Jaxon Willard – Dancer
- Chandler – Dancer
- Oscar Ramos – Dancer
- Antonio Spinelli – Dancer
- Stanley Glover – Dancer
- Daniel Muñoz – Dancer
- Mykee Moves – Dancer
- Eddy Soares – Dancer
- Sam Vázquez – Dancer
- Jal Joshua – Dancer
- Jesse Johnson – Dancer
- Jovanni Christian Soto – Dancer
- Yai Ariza – Dancer
- Mario D. Harris – Dancer
- Llorenç Barceló – Keyboards

Crew

- Agustin Boffi – Tour Manager
- Alejandro Agra – Production Manager
- Jordi Picazos – Stage Manager
- Unai Lascano Muro – Ableton Live Tech
- Aaron Wade – LD
- Mecnun Giasar – Choreographer
- Jacob Jonas – Choreographer
- Ferran Echegaray – Creative director
- Pilar Vila Tobella – Creative director
- Jesse Blevins – Lighting design
- Lucas Casanovas - Live Camera Designer
- José María Mourin Pérez – Sound design
- Omar Mohamed Luis – D3 programmer
- Dion Lee – Costume designer
- Pepa Salazar – Costume designer
