= Motomami =

- Standard cover (Note: In the deluxe version, Motomami +, the background is red and the shield is down, showing a plus sign.)

Studio album by Rosalía
- Released: 18 March 2022
- Recorded: March 2020 – August 2021
- Studios: Angel Sound and Ca La Laia (Barcelona); Electric Lady and the Mercer Hotel (New York City); Larrabee, The Edition Hotel, Dejavú Apartment, Kingsway, and Republic Studios (Los Angeles); Motomami House, The Hit Factory, Kiss the Chief, and The Library Room (Miami); La Caja de Música (Castilleja de la Cuesta); LeoRD Produciendo Studio (Santo Domingo)
- Genres: Experimental pop; alternative reggaeton
- Length: 42:17; 61:43 (Motomami +)
- Language: Spanish
- Label: Columbia
- Producers: Rosalía; Dylan Wiggins; El Guincho; Frank Dukes; Michael Uzowuru; Noah Goldstein; Pharrell Williams; Sky Rompiendo; Tainy; Teo Halm

Rosalía chronology
El Mal Querer (2018)	Motomami (2022)	Lux (2025)

Singles from Motomami
- 1. "La Fama" Released: 11 November 2021; 2. "Saoko" Released: 4 February 2022; 3. "Chicken Teriyaki" Released: 24 February 2022; 4. "Despechá" Released: 28 July 2022

Motomami is the third studio album by Spanish singer Rosalía. It was released on 18 March 2022 through Columbia Records. Rosalía enlisted producers Noah Goldstein, Michael Uzowuru, Dylan Wiggins and Pharrell Williams as well as longtime colleague El Guincho to create a concept album about her feelings during the past three years, including troubled times with fame, homesickness and isolation in the form of a collage of the singer's musical influences, especially in Latin music. Separated in two parts, it features guest vocals from the Weeknd, who sings in Spanish, and Tokischa, and is presented as Rosalía's "most personal and confessional album so far."

The album's release was preceded by three singles along with "Hentai" as a promotional single. "La Fama" was released on 11 November 2021 as the album's lead single, attaining both critical and commercial success. The song peaked at number two on the US Hot Latin Songs chart and reached the top ten in France, El Salvador, Spain and Panama. "Saoko" and "Chicken Teriyaki" were released as the second and third singles, respectively, both reaching the top twenty in Spain. Other promotional initiatives included a Grand Theft Auto Online radio station and a performance on Saturday Night Live, becoming the first Spanish solo act to serve as the show's musical guest. Rosalía embarked on the Motomami World Tour from July to December 2022, traveling around Europe and the Americas. A deluxe edition of the album, titled Motomami +, was released on 9 September featuring five additional tracks, including the hit single "Despechá".

Upon its release, Motomami received universal acclaim from music critics, many of whom praised the experimentation and genre-bending sounds. It later became the best reviewed and most discussed album of 2022 on Metacritic. Commercially, the album entered twenty-two charts in nineteen countries and reached the top ten in seven of them. Motomami entered major market charts, reaching the top forty in both on the UK Albums Chart and the Billboard 200. In Spain, it peaked atop the PROMUSICAE chart for six consecutive weeks. It also became the second most-streamed female album of the year worldwide.

At the 23rd Annual Latin Grammy Awards, Motomami won Album of the Year, Best Alternative Music Album, Best Engineered Album and Best Recording Package, making Rosalía the first woman to win Album of the Year twice, whilst "La Fama" was nominated for Record of the Year and "Hentai" for Song of the Year and Best Alternative Song. It also won Best Latin Rock or Alternative Album at the 65th Annual Grammy Awards, while its lack of nominations in the general field categories was widely considered a "snub" by the Recording Academy.

== Background ==
In November 2018, Rosalía released her second studio album El Mal Querer to critical acclaim and commercial success. The concept album, inspired by the 13th-century anonymous Occitan Romance of Flamenca, launched the singer into mainstream stardom. The album received critical acclaim for its avant-garde production, which fused flamenco music with pop and urbano. El Mal Querer was listed in many year-end publications as well as in Rolling Stone's 500 Greatest Albums of All Time. It was also awarded Album of the Year at the 20th Annual Latin Grammy Awards and Best Latin Rock, Urban or Alternative Album at the 62nd Annual Grammy Awards.

Recording sessions for the singer's next project began in Los Angeles as early as 2019. While on tour that year, Rosalía released a collection of singles. In March, the first of eight, "Con Altura", featuring J Balvin and el Guincho, was released on digital platforms. It topped the charts in Argentina, Venezuela, Spain and Colombia among others and was the second most-watched music video released in 2019 on YouTube as well as the most-watched female music video that year. 2019 also saw the release of "Yo x Ti, Tu x Mi", featuring Ozuna, "Aute Cuture", "A Palé" and "Milionària", whilst "Juro Que" and "TKN", featuring Travis Scott, were released the following year. The latter of which became her first entry on the Billboard Hot 100.

When Dutch radio station 3voor12 asked the singer through a Zoom press conference about a possible single compilation or box set, Rosalía expressed total rejection to the idea explaining that "I don't really enjoy records that are just a collection of singles. I usually enjoy records that tell a story and that are alive and involve a lot of thinking." She continued by stating that "as a musician I feel the responsibility to release a cohesive album, one that makes sense; one in where the songs are linked and share an essence". Rosalía was later seen in the recording studio with Michael Uzowuru, Mike Dean and the Neptunes among others.

During 2021, Rosalía released the standalone singles "Lo Vas a Olvidar" and "Linda" alongside Billie Eilish and Tokischa, respectively. In May, talent manager Rebecca León confirmed that Rosalía wouldn't release an album in 2021. In August, the singer revealed to Santiago Matías that the album "was already taking shape". In October, the singer teased on TikTok that the project would be released "soon" and premiered 30 seconds of the album's lead single. During a fan meet and greet in Mexico organized by Exa FM, Rosalía revealed that her new album would be "very different" from its predecessor and that the lead single would be released in November.

Motomami was officially announced on 2 November 2021, the third anniversary of El Mal Querer, along with a 15-second trailer directed by Daniel Sannwald, containing a snippet of the title track as well as a tentative '2022' release date. Sannwald also pictured the album cover, which was revealed on social media on 31 January 2022. On 8 November 2021, Rosalía announced the album's lead single, "La Fama" featuring the Weeknd. It was released on 11 November.

== Recording ==
Rosalía began work on Motomami in January 2019 and finished in August 2021. However, during the first year of production, she was still promoting her sophomore album on El Mal Querer Tour and was still figuring out the direction she wanted to go in. Rosalía had begun thinking of several ideas for the album before El Mal Querer was released in November 2018. The confection of the album went through many stages as Rosalía was once convinced of making "four projects at the same time" differencing a flamenco record, a piano ballad one, a dark pop one, and an alternative reggaeton record. The singer ended up "finding a purport within chaos", committing to a color palette at the sound level. The production on Motomami distinguishes six elements that get used in almost every track: "aggressive" drums, filters that "make the music seem distant", a nude voice (no use of vocal harmonies or reverbs), the use of vocal chops, and a repeated minimalist production. During the album's creation, Rosalía drew influences from artists of all disciplines such as Héctor Lavoe, Nina Simone, Patti Smith, Bach, Michèle Lamy, Ocean Vuong, Yayoi Kusama, Ricardo Bofill and Andrei Tarkovsky. On 25 April 2022, she shared a seven-hour Spotify playlist of music that she was inspired by, dubbed "Inspo$ Motomami", which included artists such as Daddy Yankee, Madonna, David Bowie, Björk, Snoop Dogg, Manuel Molina, Carla Bruni, etc.

The majority of the album was recorded between 2020 and 2021. The process was registered on the singer's private Instagram account 'holamotomami', which she made public in December 2021. During tour season in 2019, Rosalía suffered from writer's block as she was constantly releasing new material and performing live, with isolation during the COVID-19 pandemic and partly moving with Frank Ocean to New York City helping the process flow despite being homesick. Rosalía didn't leave the United States until June 2021 due to travel restrictions during the pandemic. During her time in the States, she had "twelve-to-sixteen hour long" studio sessions almost every day, whether at her rented home in Miami (dubbed as Motomami House) or at recording studios in Hollywood and Manhattan, where she recorded upwards of nearly 30 songs for the album. Rosalía had troubled time with deadlines, pushing the album's release a couple times. The mixing and mastering process of Motomami took nine months, being completed on 15 April 2021. "Saoko" was the last song Rosalía wrote for the album and "La Combi Versace" the most modified as she "changed the arrangement completely right before she was going to turn in the album" as well as the featured artist, which was originally Tego Calderón.

== Music and lyrics ==
Primarily, Motomami is an experimental pop and alternative reggaeton record that also explores bachata, hip-hop, flamenco, art pop, chiptune, bolero, electropop and dembow as well as mambo, merengue and funk carioca in its expanded edition. In an interview with Diego Ortiz for Rolling Stone, Rosalía described the album as a "brave" record that is "heavily influenced by reggaeton". She then expressed that the album is the "most personal and confessional album that I've made so far", revolving around lyrical themes of transformation, sexuality, heartbreak, celebration, spirituality, self-respect and isolation. Motomami is largely inspired by the Latin music she danced to with her cousins as a child, and encountered again traveling the world as a budding pop star.

Critics compared "the degree of lyrical, rhythmic and sonic experimentation" to Beastie Boys' Ill Communication (1994) and Moby's Play (1999), and found similarities in Lorde's Pure Heroine (2013) and Nine Inch Nails' The Downward Spiral (1994) and in the works of Frank Ocean and Kanye West. Some media outlets later found resemblances of Motomami in Charli XCX's Brat (2024) and in Tini's Un Mechón de Pelo (2024).

I love thinking every project should be different than the one before. I'm not interested at all in any formula, or some shit like that. MOTOMAMI is built on letting things that happen affect my songs and the way I write—the travels, all of that, letting that affect it sonically, visually. I would love to express what is happening in these three years, so when I'm 70 or 80 and look back and listen to this album, I really can feel and see what was happening in that moment. I don't have the time to keep a diary, and I didn't like that. With this album, I created an excuse to actually write about what was really happening. I tried to convey the ambivalence, if that makes sense—a place or context can be really exciting, but at the same time it can be very hostile.

— Rosalía on the album's confection, Pitchfork

=== Songs ===
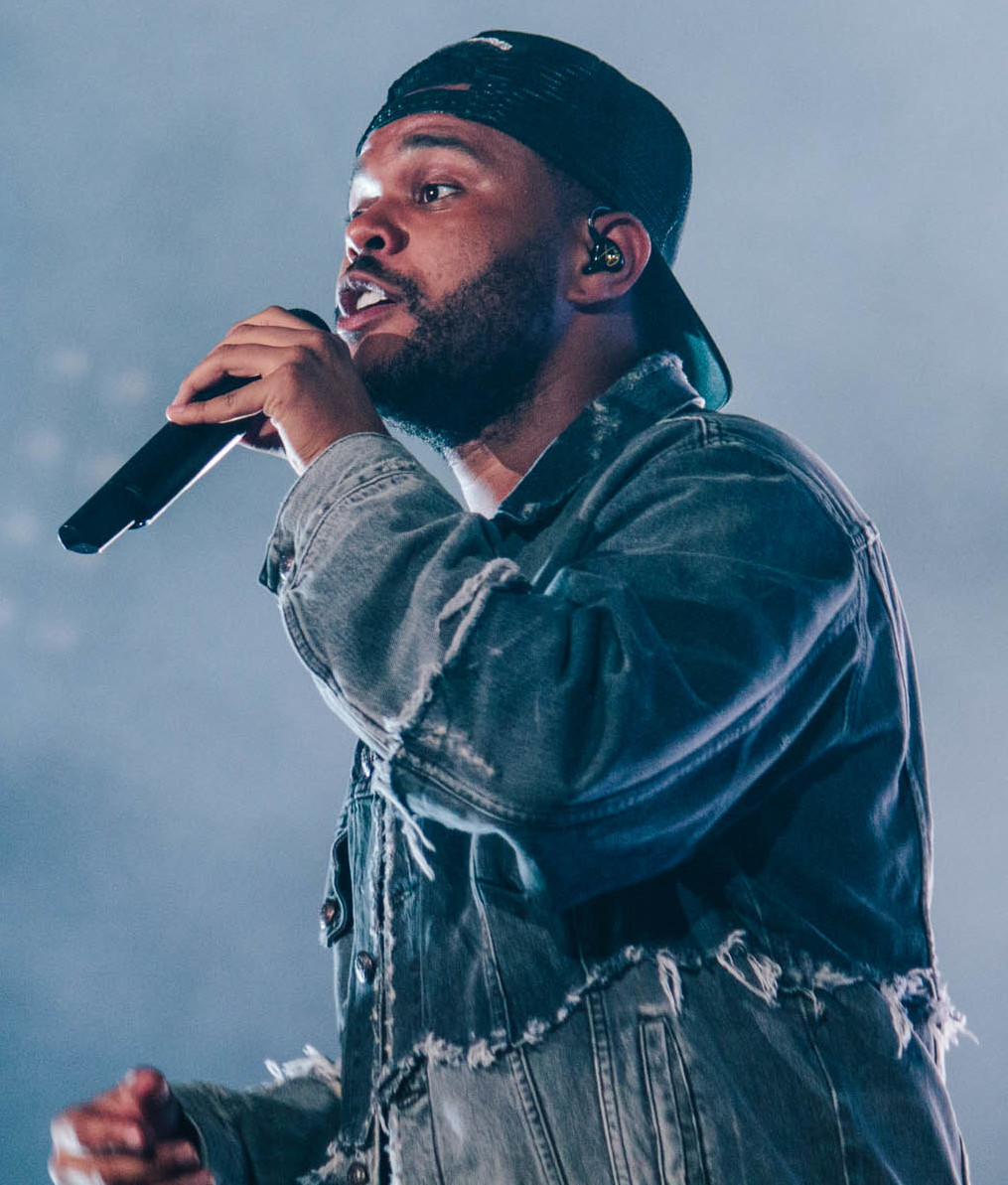
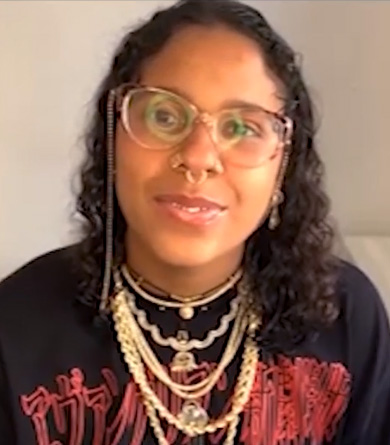
The Weeknd (left) and Tokischa (right) provide vocals on "La Fama" and "La Combi Versace" respectively.

Motomami begins with "Saoko", an alternative reggaeton and experimental track with industrial and avant-jazz elements. The song features heavy synthesizers, distorted pianos and traditional reggaeton drums; while its lyrics celebrate transformation and change. The reggaeton sounds continue into its "slow-building" second track "Candy", where Rosalía sings about a broken relationship over "shimmering" synthesizers. Its third track, "La Fama" featuring The Weeknd, is a midtempo bachata influenced by electropop that details the downsides of fame. Rosalía returns to her flamenco background in the fourth track "Bulerías", which sees her defending her position as a celebrity over communal chants.

The fifth track "Chicken Teriyaki" has been described as a "TikTok dance-ready" reggaeton track where Rosalía raps about a trip to New York City. The song is highlighted for its use of "ironic" and humorous lyricism. The sixth track "Hentai" is a "delicate" piano ballad with pulsing electronic beats that explores the pleasures of sexual intercourse and female sexuality. The seventh track "Bizcochito" is a chiptune track that's "so playful it sounds like an ice cream truck rolling through the neighborhood." Rosalía sings about isolation and homesickness during her time in the United States within the pandemic in "G3 N15" as she also delivers a pessimist point of view of Los Angeles in between piano melodies. It features a voice message of her maternal grandmother in Catalan. Followed up by the title track, "Motomami" serves as an interlude. The tenth track, "Diablo", lays Rosalía's pitch-shifted vocals over ominous electronica and an off-kilter reggaeton beat. It features uncredited guest vocals by Leyvan and James Blake.

The eleventh track "Delirio de Grandeza" reimagines Justo Betancourt's 1968 track of the same name, adding a sample from Soulja Boy's remix of "Delirious" by Vistoso Bosses. The twelfth track "Cuuuuuuuuuute" is a clattering cyberpunk and deconstructed club song that suddenly switches to piano balladry and back again. It draws inspiration from Kate Bush's "Wuthering Heights". The thirteenth "Como Un G" is a piano ballad about an unrequited, ephemeral love. The following track "Abcdefg" serves as an interlude. It features a voicenote in which Rosalía recites an acrostic poem based on the alphabet. Rosalía and featured artist Tokischa describe having fun dressed in Versace in "La Combi Versace", a minimalist dembow/neoperreo track. The sixteenth track "Sakura" is an "emotionally authoritative" closing track that sounds like it was recorded live in an arena as it features audience cheers recorded during the El Mal Querer Tour. In "Sakura", Rosalía compares her time as a pop star to the brief life of a cherry blossom.

== Concept ==
During an interview with Zane Lowe for Apple Music 1, Rosalía described Motomami as a loose concept album that paints a self-portrait. She also revealed that the album is more playful than her previous albums, explaining: "I feel like I haven't done that in the other albums. Also, they were much more serious if that makes sense. And I think that in this one, I was like, 'I really want to find a way to allow my sense of humor to be present.'"

About the title, Rosalía has stated that she chose to name it Motomami in honor of her mother, Pilar Tobella, who used to take Rosalía around town on a motorcycle. The singer also told Brut that the 'Motomami' noun was indeed by her friend Maite back in high school, who used it in her Hotmail address. It also references the company her mother runs, Motomami S.L., which she created in 2018 to administer activities around artist representation. Rosalía shared that she chose the name Motomami because it's "structured in binaries, two types of contrasting energy." The album is separated into two parts; Moto is the divine, experimental, frictional and the strongest part of the album, while Mami is the genuine, personal, confessional and vulnerable one. Rosalía also stated that "feminism is implicit in the intention. It is very much present in some songs, and maybe not some much in some others, because in the end, it's all the emotional journey of the ups and downs an artist can take. There's a lot of my day-to-day life that's why this vindication of women and femininity are implicit." Rosalía hopes Motomami "provides a feminist counterbalance to misogyny in music".

== Release and promotion ==
The album was issued on 18 March 2022, by Columbia Records, Rosalía's first to be released under the label. The standard edition was released on CD, vinyl, digital download and streaming. The vinyl was released on a red coloured vinyl. A premium boxset containing a red 12" vinyl, a zine photographic shot by Carlota Guerrero in Mallorca and thank you note from Rosalía was sent to selected fans, personal friends and celebrities.

The deluxe edition of the album, Motomami +, was released on streaming platforms on 9 September 2022. It contains five additional tracks, a remix of "Candy" featuring Chencho Corleone, a thank you voice message and a live version of "La Fama" recorded at Palau Sant Jordi, in Barcelona on 24 July 2022 during the Motomami World Tour.

=== Singles and music videos ===
Rosalía's executive team chose "La Fama" as the album's lead single, released on 11 November 2021. The song, which features vocals by Canadian singer the Weeknd, was met with great critical reception for its neo form of classical bachata, and achieved commercial success in Europe and Latin America. It became the singer's eighth number one single in Spain as well as her best performing song in France, peaking at five. Columbia released the accompanying music video, directed by Director X, on the same day. Inspired in From Dusk till Dawn (1996), it takes place in a cabaret and features a cameo appearance from actor Danny Trejo. "Saoko" was released as the second single on 4 February 2022 to universal critical acclaim. Valentin Petit directed its music video, which premiered the afternoon of the single release, and showcases a motorcycle-flipping spectacle around Kyiv. Petit and co-editor Jon Echeveste would go on to win the MTV Video Music Award for Best Editing for their work. "Chicken Teriyaki" was released as the album's third single twenty days later, featuring a music video directed by Tanu Muino and mixed reviews from music critics.

Two days ahead of Motomami's scheduled release, Rosalía released "Hentai" as a promotional single. "Hentai" had already been teased via TikTok in January, sparking negative backlash due to its sexual content and "plain, explicit, vulgar" lyrics. Nevertheless, once released, it received positive comments from the general public. "Candy" was accompanied with a music video on release day, directed by Stillz and heavily inspired in the 2003 film Lost in Translation. Despite the lack of radio promotion, it became the singer's ninth number one single in Spain, while also entering the charts in Argentina, Portugal and Switzerland and reaching the top seventy on the Billboard Global 200. A music video for "Motomami", directed by Daniel Sannwald, premiered on YouTube on 18 April 2022 to promote the album's accompanying tour. A music video for "Delirio de Grandeza", directed by Mitch Ryan, also premiered on YouTube on 11 May 2022 after it was announced on social media one day prior.

=== Marketing ===
Promotional strategies for the Motomami rollout started in November 2021, with the album's announcement and the release of its lead single. Catalogued as "brilliant", the marketing campaign behind this third album mixed physical promotional banners, radio singles, magazine features, social media interaction and an extensive use of TikTok to tease future content. Rosalía first teased the lead single "La Fama" on the platform in October and formally announced its release on 8 November. The singer would continue teasing her new material through TikTok, later advancing "Saoko", "Hentai" and "Chicken Teriyaki". With the lead single impacting radio stations and with the album's title and tentative '2022' date revealed, Rosalía covered the December edition of Rolling Stone en Español with an article written by Diego Ortiz narrating the recording process of Motomami. The singer would later grace the cover of GQ, El País, Vogue Italia and I-D. The recording process of Motomami was also shared through a private Instagram page, 'holamotomami', which she made public in January 2022. This action created engagement with fans and consumers and showed "the best of both worlds" while creating a musical body.

During Art Basel week in December 2021, various promotional graffitis of Motomami started to appear in the streets of Miami Beach. This kind of banners were later exported to other cities including Barcelona, Buenos Aires, New York City, Madrid, Mexico City, Milan, Seoul and Tokyo. These ones included unreleased lyrics of upcoming songs. Light in the dark Spotify-sponsored billboards were placed in central public spaces in Madrid, Mexico City and Milan upon the album's release.

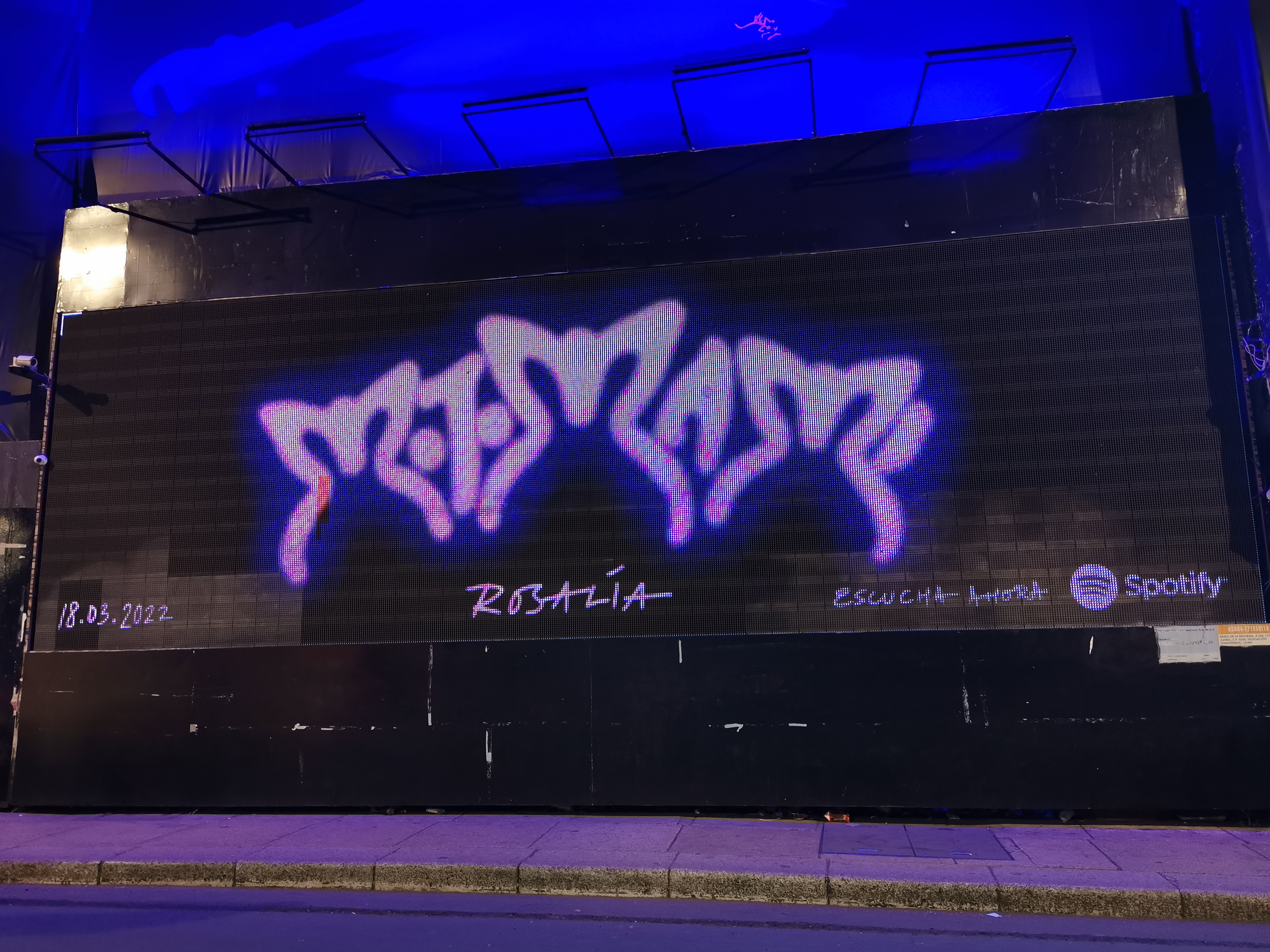
Motomami promotional banners in Mexico City.

Starting 27 February, Rosalía posted daily on Twitter about the characteristics of the 'motomami', the fictional concept she adopted for the album, transforming it into an identity. The twenty-tweet series was completed on release day. The technique was popularized within her fanbase and the general public. Several brands and associations (mainly in Spain), such as AliExpress and FC Barcelona, referenced it. In March 2023, due to their partnership with Spotify and to celebrate one year since the album's release, FC Barcelona release a limited edition 'Motomami' shirt, which players wore during two matches against Real Madrid. Rosalía embraced the mixed reviews and backlash she received for her "kitsch" lyrics after teasing "Hentai" and "Chicken Teriyaki" on TikTok, reversing the initial negative idea through self-referential and self-deprecating humor.

As for radio and television, Rosalía gave interviews to Zane Lowe for Apple Music, Leila Cobo for VP Latin, Amelia Dimoldenberg for Chicken Shop Date, Los 40, RTVE, Cadena SER, RAC 1, Catalunya Ràdio and Exa among others. The singer made her US late night debut on The Tonight Show Starring Jimmy Fallon on 10 March, performed "Chicken Teriyaki" and "La Fama" on Saturday Night Live two days later, and was interviewed on El Hormiguero on 17 March. An album-signing party organized by Fnac was held in Madrid on 18 March. Rosalía later appeared in various shows in France such as Quotidien and NRJ. On 7 April, Spanish musician and YouTuber Jaime Altozano analyzed Motomami the same way he did in 2018 with El Mal Querer, this time featuring direct notes from the singer.

==== Motomami Los Santos ====
On 15 December 2021, a new radio station in Grand Theft Auto Online, Motomami Los Santos, premiered as a result of a partnership between the singer and Rockstar Games. Curated by Rosalía and Arca, it includes personal favorite songs of both artists as well as songs from their own catalogue. It includes tracks from Camarón de la Isla, Daddy Yankee, Caroline Polachek and Aventura among others as well as an unreleased track by Bad Gyal. Kaydy Cain and Rosalía's older sister Pilar also make speaking cameos. Coinciding with the release of the radio station, Los Santos' Eclipse Boulevard displayed many billboards promoting Rosalía's upcoming studio album.

==== Motomami Live ====
On 28 February, Rosalía announced a TikTok concert, titled Motomami Live, filmed in London and directed by Stillz, to celebrate the album's release. The singer played on the video platform on 17 and 18 March. The pre-show included thirty minutes of informal interviews with Brittany Broski, Camilo, Ibai Llanos, Lele Pons, Pabllo Vittar, Pharrell Williams, and Rauw Alejandro. The show attracted four million viewers and featured eleven debut performances of tracks off the album. It was nominated for a Latin Grammy Award for Best Long Form Music Video and a Grammy Award for Best Music Film.

=== Tour ===
In October 2021, in the mark of the BIME Pro music conference, tour manager Agustín Boffi revealed that Rosalía will embark on a "world tour in 2022" that has been being prepared "for over a year". Boffi also revealed that the tour crew will be expanded to "over 150 people" compared to the 40 people that were working on her previous concert cycle. On 18 April 2022, the tour dates were revealed. The forty-six-date long concert series began on 6 July in Almería and ended on 18 December, in Paris. It met great commercial reception, selling over 343,000 tickets and grossing $28.1 million.

== Critical reception ==
Professional ratings
Aggregate scores
Source	Rating
AnyDecentMusic?	8.5/10
Metacritic	94/100
Review scores
Source	Rating
AllMusic	4.5/5 stars
Clash	9/10
The Daily Telegraph	5/5 stars
The Independent	5/5 stars
The Line of Best Fit	9/10
Mondo Sonoro	8/10
NME	5/5 stars
The Observer	4/5 stars
Pitchfork	8.4/10
Rolling Stone	4/5 stars

Motomami was met with widespread acclaim from music critics, who often commended the album's experimentation and genre-bending sounds. At Metacritic, which assigns a normalized rating out of 100 to reviews from professional publications, the album received an average score of 94 based on 17 reviews, indicating "universal acclaim", making it the site's highest-rated album of 2022 and placing it as their 17th best album of all time. Aggregator AnyDecentMusic? gave it 8.5 out of 10, based on their assessment of the critical consensus.

In a five-star review, Diego Ortiz of Rolling Stone en Español wrote that Motomami "redefines the concept of the mainstream with its abstract sound exploration, where borders and genres are completely blurred. Undoubtedly, it is one of the boldest and most daring productions of recent years and which in turn paves a new path of almost infinite possibilities." Brittany Spanos of the same outlet's American edition characterized its sounds as "innovative" and "daring". Mark Richardson of The Wall Street Journal agrees, writing, "...for Rosalía, this future-forward strain of pop is swirled together with rap, the Caribbean style reggaetón, dance, and, of course, flamenco—here, folk guitars collide with otherworldly digital processing. She's a visionary in the mode of M.I.A. or Madonna, one who uses her mainstream perch to push music in new directions." Thom Jurek of AllMusic described the record as "provocative and risky as it is creative. It showcases Rosalía as a master, twisting together the contradictory strands of Latin and Anglo pop with traditional and vanguard forms and fresh sounds into a gloriously articulated radical approach that makes for obsessive listening." Nathan Evans of The Quietus wrote that Motomami "darts away from the angelic image of Rosalía's previous work, stirring the cauldron to create an outlandish, genre-hopping revision of herself."

Pitchfork crowned Motomami with its "Best New Music" honor, with Julianne Escobedo Shepherd writing, "It feels rare to hear an album that's so experimental, that aspires to stretch itself out across genres and play with form, and that attains exactly what it sets out to achieve. Rosalía was already a formidable singer, but here she also sounds like she learned that with global superstardom comes the freedom to set her own agenda."

== Accolades ==
Motomami received a nomination for the Best Latin Rock or Alternative Album at the 65th Annual Grammy Awards and won in the category. However, its omission in the Album of the Year category was dubbed a "glaring absence that shows that the Recording Academy still has a lot to learn about music in other languages" by Rolling Stone's Brittany Spanos. Other outlets considered the omission surprising or a "snub" as well, including The New York Times, Yahoo! Entertainment, and W.

Awards and nominations for Motomami
Year	Organization	Award	Result	Ref.
2022	Premios Juventud	Album of the Year	Nominated	
2022	Premios Tu Música Urbano	Female Album of the Year	Nominated	
2022	Billboard Latin Music Awards	Latin Pop Album of the Year	Won	
2022	Latin Grammy Awards	Album of the Year	Won	
2022	Latin Grammy Awards	Best Alternative Music Album	Won	
2022	Latin Grammy Awards	Best Engineered Album	Won	
2022	Latin Grammy Awards	Best Recording Package	Won	
2022	American Music Awards	Favorite Latin Album	Nominated	
2022	LOS40 Music Awards	Best Album (Spain)	Won	
2023	Grammy Awards	Best Latin Rock or Alternative Album	Won	
2023	Premio Lo Nuestro	Album of the Year	Nominated	
2023	Premio Lo Nuestro	Urban Album of the Year	Nominated	
2023	Latin American Music Awards	Album of the Year	Nominated	
2023	Latin American Music Awards	Best Pop Album	Won	
2023	Rolling Stone en Español Awards	Album of the Year	Nominated	

=== Year-end lists ===
Select critical rankings for Motomami
Publication	List	Rank	Ref.
A.V. Club	Here Are the 30 Best Albums of 2022	4	
Billboard	The 50 Best Albums of 2022	5	
Crack	The Top 50 Albums of the Year	2	
Entertainment Weekly	The 10 Best Albums of 2022	2	
The Fader	The 50 Best Albums of 2022	3	
The Guardian	The 50 Best Albums of 2022	5	
The Independent	Best Albums of 2022	1	
Los Angeles Times	The 20 Best Albums of 2022	2	
NME	The 50 Best Albums of 2022	9	
The New York Times	Jon Caramanica's Best Albums of 2022	2	(Note: The New York Times released three year-end album rankings by three of their music critics. Motomami was one of only two albums, alongside Beyoncé's Renaissance, to be ranked on all three lists, placing third on Lindsey Zoladz's list in addition to second on both Caramanica's and Pareles'.)
The New York Times	Jon Pareles' Best Albums of 2022	2	(Note: The New York Times released three year-end album rankings by three of their music critics. Motomami was one of only two albums, alongside Beyoncé's Renaissance, to be ranked on all three lists, placing third on Lindsey Zoladz's list in addition to second on both Caramanica's and Pareles'.)
NPR	Best Albums of 2022	3	
People	People Picks the Top 10 Albums of the Year	6	
Pitchfork	The 50 Best Albums of 2022	6	
Pitchfork	The 100 Best Albums of the 2020s So Far (2024)	8	
Rolling Stone	The 100 Best Albums of 2022	4	
Rolling Stone	Rob Sheffield's Top 20 Albums of 2022	6	
The Telegraph	The Best Albums of 2022 – and the Worst	1	
Time	The 10 Best Albums of 2022	10	
Variety	The Best Albums of 2022	1	
The Washington Post	Music in 2022: The 10 Best Singles and Albums of the Year	1	

== Commercial performance ==
In the United States, Motomami debuted at number 33 on Billboard 200 with 17,000 equivalent album units sold in its first week, marking her first entry on this chart. It achieved the largest opening week for a Latin pop album in 2022. The album also opened at number one on Top Latin Pop Albums, becoming her second album to reach the top spot.

== Track listing ==
Credits adapted from Rosalia's official website.

Motomami track listing
No.	Title	Lyrics	Music	Producer(s)	Length
1.	"Saoko"	Rosalía Vila Tobella; Urbani Mota Cedeño; Juan Iván Orengo; Luis Morera	R. Vila Tobella; Noah Goldstein; Dylan Wiggins; Justin Rafael Quiles; Michael Uzowuru; David Rodríguez; Morera; Cedeño; Orengo	Rosalía^{[c]}; Goldstein; Dylan Patrice; Uzowuru; D. Rodríguez^{[b]}	2:17
2.	"Candy"	R. Vila Tobella; Pablo Díaz-Reixa	R. Vila Tobella; Díaz-Reixa; Adam Feeney; Kaan Güneşberk; D. Rodríguez; William Bevan; LaShawn Daniels; Fred Jerkins III; Rodney Jerkins; William Ray Norwood, Jr.	Rosalía; El Guincho; Frank Dukes^{[c]}; Goldstein^{[c]}; Uzowuru; Tainy	3:13
3.	"La Fama" (featuring the Weeknd)	R. Vila Tobella	R. Vila Tobella; Abel Tesfaye; Goldstein; Feeney; Alejandro Ramírez; Marco Masís; Díaz-Reixa; Wiggins; D. Rodríguez	Goldstein; Rosalía^{[c]}; Frank Dukes^{[c]}; Patrice^{[c]}; Sky Rompiendo; El Guincho; Tainy; Roland Gajate Garcia^{[a]}; Jean Rodríguez^{[b]}	3:08
4.	"Bulerías"	R. Vila Tobella; Daniel Gómez Carrero	Traditional; R. Vila Tobella; José Miguel Vizcaya Sánchez; Goldstein; Wiggins; D. Rodríguez	Goldstein^{[c]}; Rosalía^{[c]}; Patrice^{[a]}	2:35
5.	"Chicken Teriyaki"	R. Vila Tobella; Raúl Alejandro Ocasio Ruiz; Díaz-Reixa	R. Vila Tobella; Díaz-Reixa; Ramírez; Kamaal Fareed; Uzowuru; D. Rodríguez	El Guincho; Rompiendo; Ramírez; Uzowuru; Goldstein; Rosalía^{[c]}	2:02
6.	"Hentai"	R. Vila Tobella; Pilar Vila Tobella; Pharrell Williams	R. Vila Tobella; Williams; Chad Hugo; Uzowuru; Larry Gold; Goldstein; Wiggins; Jacob Sherman; D. Rodríguez	Rosalía^{[c]}; Williams; Uzowuru; Goldstein; Patrice^{[a]}	2:42
7.	"Bizcochito"	R. Vila Tobella	R. Vila Tobella; Uzowuru; D. Rodríguez	Uzowuru; Rosalía^{[c]}; El Zorro^{[a]}; D. Rodríguez^{[a]}	1:49
8.	"G3 N15"	R. Vila Tobella	R. Vila Tobella; Cory Henry; Goldstein; Wiggins; D. Rodríguez	Rosalía^{[c]}; Goldstein^{[c]}; Patrice^{[c]}; Uzowuru^{[a]}	4:12
9.	"Motomami"	R. Vila Tobella	R. Vila Tobella; Williams; Uzowuru; D. Rodríguez	Williams; Rosalía^{[c]}; Uzowuru	1:01
10.	"Diablo"	R. Vila Tobella; Díaz-Reixa	R. Vila Tobella; Díaz-Reixa; James Blake Litherland; Feeney; Uzowuru; Goldstein; D. Rodríguez	Frank Dukes; El Guincho^{[c]}; Rosalía^{[c]}; Goldstein^{[c]}; D. Rodríguez^{[a]}^{[c]}; Nick León^{[a]}	2:45
11.	"Delirio de Grandeza"	Carlos Querol; James W. Manning	R. Vila Tobella; Uzowuru; D. Rodríguez; Querol; Manning	Uzowuru; Rosalía^{[c]}	2:35
12.	"Cuuuuuuuuuute"	R. Vila Tobella; P. Vila Tobella; So Y Tiet	R. Vila Tobella; Goldstein; Wiggins; D. Rodríguez; So Y Tiet	Rosalía^{[c]}; Goldstein; So Y Tiet; Tayhana; Patrice; D. Rodriguez^{[b]}	2:30
13.	"Como un G"	R. Vila Tobella; Díaz-Reixa	R. Vila Tobella; Feeney; Litherland; Díaz-Reixa; Goldstein; D. Rodríguez	Frank Dukes; Rosalía^{[c]}; James Blake; El Guincho; Goldstein; Patrice^{[a]}	4:22
14.	"Abcdefg"	R. Vila Tobella	R. Vila Tobella	Rosalía^{[c]}	1:05
15.	"La Combi Versace" (featuring Tokischa)	R. Vila Tobella; Díaz-Reixa; Tokischa Altagracia Peralta Juárez	R. Vila Tobella; Díaz-Reixa; Williams; Teo Halm; Uzowuru; Suárez; Masís; D. Rodríguez	Goldstein; Rosalía^{[c]}; El Guincho; Williams; Rompiendo; Tainy; Uzowuru; Halm^{[a]}; Jorge Luis Delmonte^{[b]}	2:40
16.	"Sakura"	R. Vila Tobella	R. Vila Tobella; Goldstein; D. Rodríguez	Rosalía^{[c]}; Goldstein; D. Rodríguez^{[a]}	3:21
Total length:					42:17

Motomami + track listing
No.	Title	Lyrics	Music	Producer(s)	Length
13.	"Abcdefg"	R. Vila Tobella	R. Vila Tobella	Rosalía^{[c]}	1:05
14.	"La Combi Versace" (featuring Tokischa)	R. Vila Tobella; Peralta Juárez; Díaz-Reixa	R. Vila Tobella; Díaz-Reixa; Williams; Halm; Uzowuru; Suárez; Masís; D. Rodríguez	Goldstein; Rosalía^{[c]}; El Guincho; Williams; Rompiendo; Tainy; Uzowuru; Halm^{[a]}; Jorge Luis Delmonte^{[b]}	2:40
15.	"Como un G"	R. Vila Tobella; Díaz-Reixa	R. Vila Tobella; Feeney; Litherland; Díaz-Reixa; Goldstein; D. Rodríguez	Frank Dukes; Rosalía^{[c]}; Blake; El Guincho; Goldstein; Patrice^{[a]}	4:22
16.	"Thank Yu :)"	R. Vila Tobella	R. Vila Tobella	Rosalía	0:34
17.	"Despechá"	R. Vila Tobella	R. Vila Tobella; Carlos Ortiz; D. Rodríguez; Juan Rivera; Nino Segarra; Goldstein; Dylan Patrice	Rosalía; Chris Jedi; Gaby Music; Goldstein; Sir Dylan	2:36
18.	"Candy" (remix; with Chencho Corleone)	R. Vila Tobella; Chencho Corleone	R. Vila Tobella; Díaz-Reixa; Feeney; Güneşberk; D. Rodríguez; Bevan; LaShawn Daniels; Fred Jerkins III; Rodney Jerkins; William Ray Norwood, Jr.	Rosalía; El Guincho; Frank Dukes^{[c]}; Goldstein^{[c]}; Uzowuru; Tainy	3:24
19.	"La Fama" (Live en el Palau Sant Jordi)				3:46
20.	"Aislamiento"	R. Vila Tobella	R. Vila Tobella; Díaz-Reixa; Goldstein; Teo Halm; D. Rodríguez; Wiggins; Terius Gesteelde-Diamant	Rosalía; Goldstein; Patrice; El Guincho	3:26
21.	"La Kilié"	R. Vila Tobella	R. Vila Tobella; Díaz-Reixa; Gabriel do Borel; Teo Halm; D. Rodríguez; Rita Indiana; Uzowuru	Rosalía; Teo Halm; El Guincho; Uzowuru	2:11
22.	"LAX"	R. Vila Tobella	R. Vila Tobella; Díaz-Reixa; Teo Halm; D. Rodríguez; Uzowuru	Rosalía; Teo Halm; Uzowuru	1:29
23.	"Chiri"	R. Vila Tobella	R. Vila Tobella; Alejandro Ramírez Suarez; Ana Cortés Bustamante; D. Rodríguez; Wiggins; Salvador Andrades Santiago	Rosalía; Goldstein; Patrice	2:00
24.	"Sakura"	R. Vila Tobella	R. Vila Tobella; Goldstein; D. Rodríguez	Rosalía^{[c]}; Goldstein; D. Rodríguez^{[a]}	3:21
Total length:					61:43

Notes

- "Cuuuuuuuuuute" is stylised as "CUUUUuuuuuute"
- ^{^a} signifies an additional producer
- ^{^b} signifies a vocal producer
- ^{^c} also signifies a vocal producer

Sample credits

- "Saoko" contains a portion of "Saoco", written by Juan Luis Morera, Juan Iván Orengo and Urbani Mota Cedeño.
- "Candy" samples "Archangel", performed by Burial; which itself contains a sample of "One Wish", performed by Ray J.
- "Delirio de Grandeza" contains samples from "Delirio de Grandeza", written by Carlos Querol and performed by Justo Betancourt; and contains samples from "Delirious", written by James W. Manning and performed by Vistoso Bosses featuring Soulja Boy Tell 'Em.
- "Cuuuuuuuuuute" contains a sample of "Counting to 28", written by So Y Tiet.
- "La Kilié" contains a sample of "Passinho do Volante" performed by MC Federado e os Leleks.

== Personnel ==
Credits adapted from Rosalia's official website.

Musicians

- Rosalía – vocals, piano (1, 6), snaps (1), drums (1, 5, 6), vocal chops (1), background vocals (2), vocal arrangement (3, 4, 7–10, 13), arrangement (4), beat (7), organ (8), bass (8), vocal percussion (11), keyboards (11), Wurlitzer (16)
- Dylan Patrice – piano (1, 6, 8), acoustic drums (1), vocal arrangement (3, 4, 8, 13), bass (3, 6), synthesizer (3), arrangement (4)
- El Guincho – drums (2, 5, 8, 10) keyboards (5), Juno (8)
- Tainy – drums (2), bass (3)
- Noah Goldstein – 808 (2), synthesizer (2), vocal arrangement (3, 4, 8, 10, 13), arrangement (4), bass (6)
- Frank Dukes – synthesizer (2, 3, 10, 13), vocal arrangement (3, 10, 13), bass (5)
- Kaan Güneşberk – synthesizer (2)
- The Weeknd – vocals (3)
- Caroline Shaw – vocal arrangement (3, 4, 8, 10, 13, 15), background vocals (10)
- LA Session Singers – choir (3, 4, 8, 13, 15)
- Roland Gajate Garcia – drums (3), percussion (3)
- Connor Wren – background vocals (3, 4, 8, 13, 15)
- Macario Ibañez Díaz – arrangement (4), palmas (4, 15), nudillos (4), jaleos (4)
- José Alvaro Ibañez Díaz – arrangement (4), palmas (4, 15), nudillos (4), jaleos (4)
- Francisco Manuel Valencia Vargas – palmas (4, 15), nudillos (4), jaleos (4)
- Juan Diego Valencia Vargas – palmas (4, 15), nudillos (4), jaleos (4)
- Jose Manuel Angulo Peña – palmas (4, 15), nudillos (4), jaleos (4)
- Diego Fuentes Montoya – palmas (4, 15), nudillos (4), jaleos (4)
- Juan José Jaen Arroyo – palmas (4, 15), nudillos (4), jaleos (4), bailaor (4)
- Juan Carlos Grilo Mateos – palmas (4, 15), nudillos (4), jaleos (4)
- Q-Tip – background vocals (5)
- Sky Rompiendo – drums (5)
- Michael Uzowuru – bass (5), drums (6), beat (7), vocal arrangement (9)
- Jacob Sherman – piano (6)
- Larry Gold – strings (6)
- Nicole Esteller – background vocals (7)
- Carolina Hernández – background vocals (7)
- Cory Henry – organ (8)
- Pharrell Williams – vocal arrangement (9), beat (9), percussion (15)
- Olivia Pirez – background vocals (9)
- Caroline Pirez – background vocals (9)
- Giselle Hailey – background vocals (9)
- Jacqueline Taylor – background vocals (9)
- Leyvan – background vocals (10)
- James Blake – background vocals (10, 13), keyboards (10), synthesizer (13), piano (13)
- Tayhana – beat (11)
- Tokischa – vocals (15)
- Samueliyo Baby – background vocals (15)
- Irrita el Indio – background vocals (15)

Technical personnel

- David Rodríguez – recording (1–13, 15, 16)
- Manny Marroquin – mixing (1–13, 15, 16)
- Zach Peraya – mixing assistance (1–13, 15, 16)
- Jeremie Inhaber – mixing assistance (1–13, 15, 16)
- Anthony Vilchis – mixing assistance (1–13, 15, 16)
- Chris Gehringer – mastering
- Sean Matasukawa – recording (2, 3, 16)
- Tyler Murphy – recording (2, 3, 10, 13)
- Higinio Marfil Ruiz – recording (4, 15)
- Manuel Nieto – recording assistance (4, 15)
- Manolo Nieto – recording assistance (4, 15)
- Mike Larson – recording (5, 6, 9, 13)
- Brian Hernandez – recording (13)

Concept and artwork

- Rosalia Vila – creative direction, album concept
- Pili Vila – creative direction, album concept
- Ferran Echegaray – creative direction, album concept
- Daniel Sannwald – album photography
- Viktor Hammarberg – album graphic design

== Charts ==
=== Weekly charts ===
Weekly chart performance for Motomami
Chart (2022)	Peak position
Australian Hitseekers Albums (ARIA)	2
Austrian Albums (Ö3 Austria)	18
Belgian Albums (Ultratop Flanders)	3
Belgian Albums (Ultratop Wallonia)	17
Canadian Albums (Billboard)	50
Croatian International Albums (HDU)	35
Czech Albums (ČNS IFPI)	39
Dutch Albums (Album Top 100)	12
French Albums (SNEP)	15
German Albums (Offizielle Top 100)	28
Irish Albums (IRMA)	43
Italian Albums (FIMI)	24
Lithuanian Albums (AGATA)	43
Norwegian Albums (VG-lista)	40
Portuguese Albums (AFP)	1
Scottish Albums (Official Charts)	86
Slovak Albums (ČNS IFPI)	55
Spanish Albums (PROMUSICAE)	1
Swiss Albums (Schweizer Hitparade)	6
UK Albums (Official Charts)	42
Uruguayan Albums (CUD)	11
US Billboard 200	33
US Top Latin Albums (Billboard)	3
US Latin Pop Albums (Billboard)	1

=== Year-end charts ===
2022 year-end chart performance for Motomami
Chart (2022)	Position
Belgian Albums (Ultratop Flanders)	108
Belgian Albums (Ultratop Wallonia)	94
French Albums (SNEP)	53
Italian Albums (FIMI)	86
Portuguese Albums (AFP)	15
Spanish Albums (PROMUSICAE)	2
Swiss Albums (Schweizer Hitparade)	85

2023 year-end chart performance for Motomami
Chart (2023)	Position
Belgian Albums (Ultratop Wallonia)	148
French Albums (SNEP)	63
Italian Albums (FIMI)	99
Portuguese Albums (AFP)	80
Spanish Albums (PROMUSICAE)	12

2024 year-end chart performance for Motomami
Chart (2024)	Position
French Albums (SNEP)	155
Spanish Albums (PROMUSICAE)	38

== Certifications and sales ==
Certifications for Motomami
Region	Certification	Certified units/sales
Brazil (Pro-Música Brasil)	Platinum	40,000^{‡}
France (SNEP)	Platinum	100,000^{‡}
Italy (FIMI)	Platinum	50,000^{‡}
Mexico (AMPROFON)	2× Platinum	280,000^{‡}
Poland (ZPAV)	Gold	10,000^{‡}
Spain (Promusicae)	3× Platinum	120,000^{‡}
United States (RIAA)	Gold	500,000^{‡}
^{‡} Sales+streaming figures based on certification alone.

Certifications for Motomami+
Region	Certification	Certified units/sales
Brazil (Pro-Música Brasil)	Gold	20,000^{‡}
^{‡} Sales+streaming figures based on certification alone.

== Release history ==
Release dates and formats for Motomami
Region	Date	Format	Version	Label	Ref.
Various	18 March 2022	CD; digital download; streaming	Standard	Columbia	
Spain	18 March 2022	LP	Standard	Columbia	
Europe	13 May 2022	LP	Standard	Columbia	
United States	15 July 2022	LP	Standard	Columbia	
Various	9 September 2022	Digital download; streaming	Deluxe	Columbia	
Various	18 October 2024	LP	Deluxe	Columbia	
