= Despechá =

2022 single by Rosalía

Single by Rosalía

from the album Motomami +
- Language: Spanish
- Released: 28 July 2022
- Recorded: February 2022
- Genre: Merengue; mambo
- Length: 2:37
- Label: Columbia
- Composers: Rosalía; Carlos Ortiz; David Rodríguez; Juan Rivera; Nino Segarra; Noah Goldstein; Dylan Wiggins
- Lyricist: Rosalia Vila
- Producers: Rosalía; Chris Jedi; Gaby Music; Noah Goldstein; Sir Dylan

Rosalía singles chronology
"Chicken Teriyaki" (2022)	"Despechá" (2022)	"El Pañuelo" (2022)

Music video
- "Despechá" on YouTube

"Despechá" (lit. 'Spiteful') is a song by Spanish singer and songwriter Rosalía. It was released on 28 July 2022 by Columbia Records as a single from Motomami +, the deluxe edition of her third studio album Motomami (2022). The song was written by Rosalía, reggaeton veterans Chris Jedi, Gaby Music, and El Kagueto del Guetto, along with Motomami producers David Rodríguez, Noah Goldstein and Dylan Patrice. "Despechá" is a mambo track, with merengue and electropop elements, about "the joys of leaving work and toxic men behind to hit the club." A remix with American rapper Cardi B was released on 16 December 2022.

The song was met with great commercial success upon release, earning the biggest streaming debut for a Spanish-language song by a female artist in Spotify history. "Despechá" topped the charts in Spain, Panama and Uruguay, while also hitting the top ten in seventeen other countries. It became Rosalía's first solo entry on the Billboard Hot 100 and her highest charting single on the Billboard Global 200.

In 2025, Rolling Stone listed it among the greatest Spanish-language songs of the 21st century.

== Background ==
In March 2022, Rosalía released her third studio album Motomami, which saw a departure from the new flamenco sound of its predecessor and an embracement of Latin music in an avant-garde and experimental key. The album met with commercial and critical success. To further promote the record, the singer embarked on the Motomami World Tour, scheduled to visit seventeen countries from July to December 2022.

At the opening night of the tour in Almería, Rosalía unveiled three unreleased tracks, with a fourth in Seville. Two of them have been confirmed to be discarded songs from Motomami while and one was specifically written for the tour. "Despechá" (at the time known as "Lao a Lao" by fans), is performed between a 4-minute classic reggaeton medley that blends Lorna's "Papi Chulo" and "Gasolina" with Rosalía's "TKN" and "Yo x Ti, Tu x Mi"; and the unreleased track "Aislamiento". During the medley and "Despechá", Rosalía brought onstage twenty fans previously selected by her team to dance with her, making the performance a highlight within the show.

"Despechá" became a fan favorite, and videos of the performance were shared on TikTok. On 12 July, Rosalía posted a TikTok video teasing the studio version of the song. During the 19 July show in Madrid, the singer asked the audience whether they preferred the track to be titled "Despechá" or "Lao a Lao", with the audience preferring the former. After performing it at her show in Bilbao on 27 July, Rosalía revealed that "Despechá" would be released on digital platforms that same night.

== Composition ==
"Despechá" is a track with merengue and electropop elements that runs for two minutes and thirty-seven seconds. Described by Pitchfork as "a wonder of efficiency, flitting back and forth between two springy piano chords as it rides an equally fleet percussive rhythm", the song is about leaving work and heartbreak behind to have fun with one's friends in the club and see life in the most hedonist way possible. Lyrical references include Fefita la Grande and Dominican singer Omega, who was originally featured on the track.

About the song, Rosalía has stated that "there are many ways to be despechá, in this theme it is from the freeness or the craziness, moving without reservations or regrets. This is the place from where I make music, from where I did it when I first started and where I will continue to until God says so. I'm grateful for having been able to travel in recent years and have learned from music from other places including the [Dominican Republic], where artists like Fefita la Grande, Juan Luis Guerra, and Omega have inspired me and without them this song would not exist."

== Accolades ==
Awards and nominations for "Despechá"
Award	Year	Category	Result	Ref.
Billboard Latin Music Awards	2023	Tropical Song of the Year	Nominated	
Heat Latin Music Awards	2023	Song of the Year	Nominated	
Latin American Music Awards	2023	Song of the Year	Nominated	
Latin American Music Awards	2023	Favorite Tropical Song	Nominated	
Latin Grammy Awards	2023	Record of the Year	Nominated	
MTV Europe Music Awards	2022	Best Song	Nominated	
MTV Video Music Awards	2023	Best Latin	Nominated	
Premios Juventud	2023	Best Pop/Urban Song	Nominated	
Premio Lo Nuestro	2023	Pop-Urban/Dance Song of the Year	Nominated	
Rolling Stone en Español Awards	2023	Song of the Year	Nominated	
WME Awards	2022	Latin Song	Nominated	

== Music video ==
Rosalía shared a preview of the music video on 9 August 2022. The video itself premiered on the singer's YouTube channel the day after. It is the third music video in Rosalía's videography to be directed by Mitch Ryan, after "Hentai" and "Delirio de Grandeza". Inspired in the photographic collections Benidorm and Life's a Beach, by Martin Parr, as well as in Spanish costumbrismo, it features Rosalía and her Motomami World Tour dance crew during a fun beach day in the Palma neighbourhood of Portixol, in Mallorca.

== Credits and personnel ==
Production

- Rosalia Vila – production, lyrics, composition; vocals, beat, vocal arrangement
- Chris Jedi – production, composition, beat
- David Rodríguez – production, composition, additional production
- Noah Goldstein – production, composition, drums
- Dylan Patrice – production, composition, piano
- Gaby Music – production, composition
- Dimelo Ninow – composition

Technical personnel

- Manny Marroquin – mixing engineer
- Zach Peraya – assistant mix engineer
- Jeremie Inhaber – assistant mix engineer
- Anthony Vilchis – assistant mix engineer
- Chris Gehringer – mastering engineer

== Charts ==
=== Weekly charts ===
Weekly chart performance for "Despechá"
Chart (2022)	Peak position
Argentina (Argentina Hot 100)	2
Belgium (Ultratop 50 Wallonia)	5
Bolivia (Billboard)	7
Canada Hot 100 (Billboard)	80
Chile (Billboard)	7
Costa Rica (Monitor Latino)	2
Colombia (Billboard)	15
Dominican Republic (Monitor Latino)	3
Ecuador (Billboard)	6
El Salvador (Monitor Latino)	5
France (SNEP)	6
France Airplay (SNEP)	1
Global 200 (Billboard)	6
Guatemala (Monitor Latino)	5
Honduras (Monitor Latino)	5
Ireland (IRMA)	76
Italy (FIMI)	32
Luxembourg (Billboard)	11
Mexico (Billboard)	6
Netherlands (Single Tip)	9
New Zealand Hot Singles (RMNZ)	37
New Zealand Hot Singles (RMNZ) Remix with Cardi B	25
Nicaragua (Monitor Latino)	15
Panama (Monitor Latino)	1
Paraguay (Monitor Latino)	6
Peru (Billboard)	6
Portugal (AFP)	3
San Marino (SMRRTV Top 50)	41
Spain (PROMUSICAE)	1
Suriname (Nationale Top 40)	34
Switzerland (Schweizer Hitparade)	14
Uruguay (Monitor Latino)	1
US Billboard Hot 100	63
US Hot Latin Songs (Billboard)	7
US Latin Airplay (Billboard)	1
US Tropical Airplay (Billboard)	1
US Rhythmic Airplay (Billboard)	37

=== Year-end charts ===
2022 year-end chart performance for "Despechá"
Chart (2022)	Position
Belgium (Ultratop Wallonia)	67
France (SNEP)	70
Global 200 (Billboard)	104
Spain (PROMUSICAE)	3
Switzerland (Schweizer Hitparade)	63
US Hot Latin Songs (Billboard)	30

2023 year-end chart performance for "Despechá"
Chart (2023)	Position
Belgium (Ultratop 50 Wallonia)	63
Global 200 (Billboard)	112
Switzerland (Schweizer Hitparade)	52
US Hot Latin Songs (Billboard)	73

2025 year-end chart performance for "Despechá"
Chart (2025)	Position
Chile Airplay (Monitor Latino)	25

== Certifications ==
Certifications for "Despechá"
Region	Certification	Certified units/sales
Brazil (Pro-Música Brasil)	Diamond	160,000^{‡}
Canada (Music Canada)	Gold	40,000^{‡}
France (SNEP)	Diamond	333,333^{‡}
Italy (FIMI)	2× Platinum	200,000^{‡}
Mexico (AMPROFON)	Diamond+3× Platinum	1,120,000^{‡}
Poland (ZPAV)	Gold	25,000^{‡}
Portugal (AFP)	5× Platinum	125,000^{‡}
Spain (Promusicae)	13× Platinum	780,000^{‡}
Switzerland (IFPI Switzerland)	2× Platinum	40,000^{‡}
United States (RIAA)	Platinum	1,000,000^{‡}
Streaming
Chile (PROFOVI)	Platinum	29,815,140
^{‡} Sales+streaming figures based on certification alone.

== Release history ==
Release history and formats for "Despechá"
Country	Date	Format	Label	Ref
Various	28 July 2022	Digital download; streaming	Columbia	
Italy	5 August 2022	Contemporary hit radio	Sony Music Italy	
United States	23 August 2022	Rhythmic contemporary radio	Columbia	

== See also ==
- List of Billboard Hot Latin Songs and Latin Airplay number ones of 2022
- List of best-selling singles in Spain
- List of Billboard Argentina Hot 100 top-ten singles in 2022
- List of Billboard Global 200 top 10 singles of 2022
