= Sô Y Tiết =

Vietnamese singer-songwriter and cattle herder (born 1988)

- Born: Sô Y Tiết; 1988 (age 37–38)
- Origin: Bình Định, Vietnam
- Occupations: Singer-songwriter; cattle farmer
- Instrument: Vocals
- Years active: 2020–present

Sô Y Tiết (born 1988), also known under the mononym of Ytiet, is a Vietnamese singer-songwriter and cattle herder. During a difficult childhood, he and his sister were often forced to beg for food and money. He was put into an orphanage and was later adopted by a foster mother and worked as a cattle herder.

In 2020, Sô started posting videos on social media and went viral for singing numbers in English. Wiz Khalifa featured his vocals on one of his songs entitled "Number Song (From 41 to 49)". In 2022, Rosalía released the song "Cuuuuuuuuuute" (Note: Stylised as "CUUUUuuuuuute".) on her album Motomami, which features a sample from "Counting to 28" written and sung by Sô. The album won Album of the Year at the 23rd Annual Latin Grammy Awards, earning him a Latin Grammy Award as a featured artist.

== Early life ==
Sô Y Tiết was born in 1988 in what was then Bình Định (now incorporated to the Gia Lai province) to a Cham and Bahnar family. He speaks Cham and Vietnamese. Sô had a difficult childhood due to his mother's death and his father being an alcoholic without a stable job. He and his sister were often forced by their father to beg for food and money. They were later adopted by two of their relatives.

In 2000, Sô was placed in an orphanage. Six years later, he was diagnosed with chronic acute pneumonia which lead to him dropping out of the 8th grade. He went back to his hometown upon the discretion of the orphanage and lived with his uncle for a year. Before he was adopted by his foster mother, his father died in 2009 due to lung cancer. Sô was then adopted by his foster mother the following year, working as a cattle herder to help her make ends meet.

== Career ==
Sô started posting videos on YouTube and TikTok in 2020 to earn more money, posting videos mainly about his life in the countryside, cooking, herding cattle, and music. Though, he mainly went viral for videos of himself singing about topics such as the days of the week, letters of the alphabet, and especially, numbers in English. On 8 September, American rapper Wiz Khalifa released his mixtape Big Pimpin' with a track named "Number Song (From 41 to 49)" featuring vocals from Sô. The song earned mixed reactions though was praised for its melody. Videos and images of Sô were shared by multiple media personalities including Cardi B, Justin Bieber, Chris Brown, Viola Davis, Snoop Dogg, and Rihanna.

In the same year, Sô was invited to local events and eventually built a toilet for his family through his earnings. He was also invited by small record companies located in the United States to collaborate although he was not able to as he could not buy flight tickets. The following year, he released two songs entitled "Do You Know" and "Are You OK" in collaboration with American musician Thirstpro. In 2022, Spanish singer-songwriter Rosalía released the song "Cuuuuuuuuuute" alongside her album Motomami which contains a sample from "Counting to 28" written and sung by Sô. The song is described as a clattering cyberpunk song that suddenly switches to piano balladry and back again. Sô was credited with writing lyrics and producing the track. Motomami was later nominated and eventually won Album of the Year at the 23rd Annual Latin Grammy Awards, earning him a Latin Grammy Award as a featured artist.

== Awards and nominations ==
List of awards and nominations earned by Sô
Award	Year	Work	Category	Result	Ref.
Latin Grammy Awards	2022	Motomami	Album of the Year	Won	
