= Jaime Altozano =

Spanish YouTuber, musician and producer

- Born: 1993 (age 32–33); Madrid, Spain
- Occupations: Musician; music producer; YouTuber

YouTube information
- Channel: Jaime Altozano
- Years active: 2016-present
- Genre: Music
- Subscribers: 3.49 million
- Views: 385 million
- Last updated: 15 January 2026
- Website: www.jaimealtozano.com

Jaime Altozano (born 1993) is a Spanish musician, music producer and YouTuber known for promoting the musical arts online.

He was in a relationship with YouTuber and architect Ter in the period between 2017 and 2024.

== Biography ==
Jaime Altozano was born in 1993 in the Ciudad Lineal district of Madrid. He studied piano at the Arturo Soria Professional Conservatory of Music in Madrid, completed two years at the Complutense University of Madrid with a double-major in Mathematics and Physics, and studied music production at Escuela Creativa de Madrid. He started his YouTube channel in May 2017 to provide free, digestable music education videos. The increasing popularity of his videos on musical themes, such as his analysis of soundtracks including The Lord of the Rings trilogy and informative videos about classical music using songs from Pokémon, Dragon Ball, The Beatles and La Oreja de Van Gogh, helped him reach 187,000 subscribers by the end of the year. He doubled that figure five months later.

He collaborated on the Radio Clásica program Música y significado, presented by Luis Ángel de Benito, on which he analyzed the soundtracks of The Lord of the Rings by Howard Shore in 2017 and Star Wars by John Williams in 2018. He has also participated in musical segments on various radio programs including Hoy por Hoy on Cadena SER and He venido aquí a hablar de lo mío on Radio Nacional de España (RNE).

In October 2017, Spanish music lecturer Ramon Gener Sala plagiarized portions of Altozano's analysis in two YouTube videos (De Pokémon a Bach. Una historia de VOCES and Los Miserables: la Mejor Fuga de BACH) during a radio segment entitled Un gesto lo puede cambiar todo (A gesture can change everything). Gener later blamed a collaborator for the plagiarism and said he was not familiar with the work of Altozano.

On December 29, 2017, Altozano live-tweeted a streaming broadcast of La bohème by Giacomo Puccini from Teatro Real in Madrid in an attempt to get more than 100,000 people to watch the stream. In November 2018, he published a video on Rosalía's El mal querer that the singer herself reacted to on Instagram. In 2019 he appeared on the TVE program, "La mejor canción jamas cantada" (The best song ever sung). In February 2019 he made a collaboration video with the Colombian YouTuber Alvinsch, in which both competed to decide who was the best musician, and made another with the YouTuber QuantumFracture in which they collaborated with the Polytechnic University of Madrid to scientifically answer why "Happy Birthday to You" is not playable on the drum. In February 2020 he returned to Spanish television to speak to the contestants of Operación Triunfo 2020 about harmony and composition.

Altozano also has a second channel, named Musihacks which is functional since 8 December 2021. He has 96.8 subscribers and 3.9 million views. The project started off as a course.

== Personal life ==
Altozano is the cousin of video game YouTuber DayoScript. From 2017 to 2024, Altozano was in a relationship with YouTuber and Internet personality Ter. The two announced their relationship to the public through a video on the latter's channel in 2018. On 9 May 2024, the two announced the end of their relationship to the public through a newly opened channel, titled Jaime Altozano 2. They shared the end came in good terms.
