= Jake Sherman (pianist) =

American singer-songwriter and producer

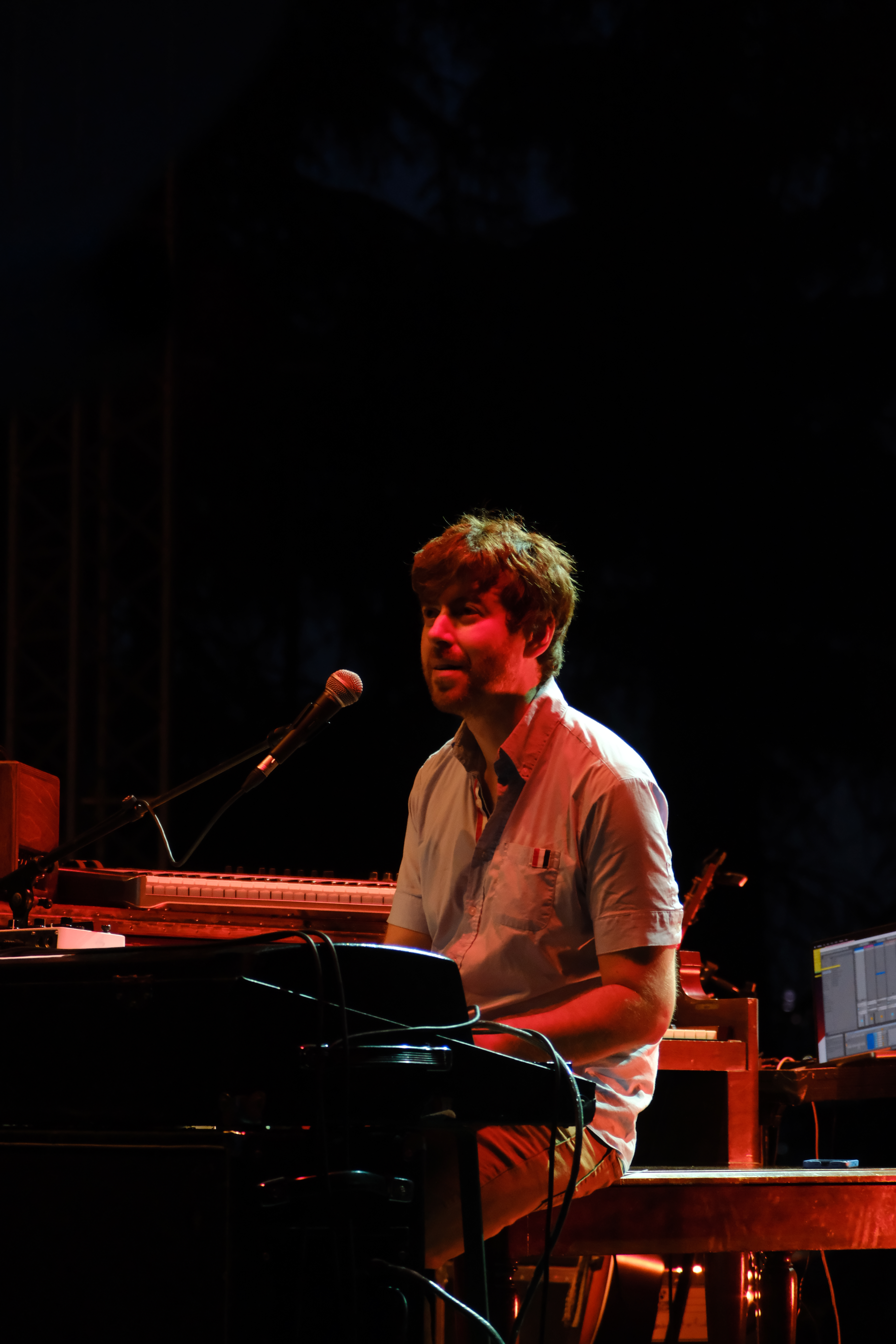
- Sherman at the Istanbul Jazz Festival 2025

Background information
- Occupations: Singer; songwriter; producer
- Instruments: Organ; keyboard; Vocals; Harmonica

Jake Sherman is an American singer-songwriter and producer. He has released five solo albums: The eponymous Jake Sherman (2012), Jake Sherman Returns (2016), Jake Sherman Gets Sexy (2020), You're a Dream (2020), and What a Wonderful World (2023).

As a sideman, he has performed with Bilal, Meshell Ndegeocello, Nick Hakim, Blood Orange, Doobie Powell, Andrew Bird, Benny Sings, Kimbra, Emily King, Gabriel Garzon-Montano, and Ralph Peterson Jr. Unity Project, among others.

== Early life ==
Jake Sherman was raised in Boston, where he interacted regularly with the musical cultures of Berklee College of Music, the New England Conservatory of Music, and Wally's Café Jazz Club, all of which he cites as influences on his work. Sherman began playing piano at the age of four and initially played Scott Joplin rags before becoming heavily influenced in jazz by Jimmy Smith and Herbie Hancock.

As a teenager, he played at Wally's Cafe in Boston on the weekends. In addition, Sherman's parents both played instruments, with his mother playing the flute and his father playing the harpsichord. Sherman, growing up, had very little "exposure to pop culture," with the initial genres he listened to being ragtime, gospel and jazz. Originally, Sherman regarded these genres and the pop music on the radio as "Two separate worlds," though eventually the fusion of these two sounds became what he now considers his music to be.

== Influences ==
Stylistically, Sherman cites the artists at Berklee, the New England Conservatory, and Wally's Café as influences. As a lyricist, Sherman claims to take inspiration from "real-life situations". He has cited the album Astro Lounge by Smash Mouth as one of the biggest influences on his production work.

== Discography ==
=== Solo Recordings ===
- Power Them Off (ft. Cory Henry) (2023)
- What A Wonderful World (2023)
- live ep (2021)
- You're A Dream (2020)
- Jake Sherman Gets Sexy (2020)
- Jake Sherman Returns (2016)
- Jake Sherman (2012)

=== Recordings with Jake and Abe ===
- The Question Remix (2023)
- Love of the Tiger Remix (2023)
- What's Never Gone [ft. Emily King] (2021)
- (I Won't Be) Home For Christmas (2020)
- Selfish Endeavor EP (2019)

=== Recordings with Jake Twig ===
- OK EP (2020)

=== Recordings as Herman Berman ===
- The Menorah: It's Lit (2019)

=== Selected Sideman Recordings ===
- Rosalia HENTAI (piano)
- Chance the Rapper No Problem (organ)
- Doobie Powell Close To You (songwriting, bass, rhodes, synths, bgv's) OK (vocals, electric piano)
- Luke Temple Both-And [album] (synths, clavinet, organ, vibraphone)
- Bilal Last Hope (keys, additional production)
- Emily King Special Occasion (piano)
- Nick Hakim Where Will We Go? (Pt. I and II) (piano, organ) GODS DIRTY WORK (synths, guitar) COMETA (keys on Happen, Vertigo, The Only One)
- L'Rain Suck Teeth (clavinet)
- Sam Evian Knock Knock, Sunshine (rhodes)
- Kimbra The Robin (piano, songwriting, additional production)
- Ethan Gruska En Garde [album] (vocoder, organ, synth)
- Delicate Steve (keys on Looking Glass, Artificial, Still Life, Find My Way)
- Gabriel Garzon-Montano Someone (vocoder, wurlitzer)
- Cyrille Aimee A Fleur De Peau [album] (production, all instruments except horns, strings, drums)
- Devin Morrison MC2U (harmonica)
- Monica Martin A Song For You, More Than Fine (production, instruments)
- Joey Dosik Game Winner- stadium version (organ) All The Way Back in Love (harmonica)
- Sebastian Mikael Dad, U Ain't Fair, Acid ptii, Rain (keys) Exit (rhodes, organ, string synth)
- Kemba Alive, Work in Progress (organ)
- Goodfight (keys and harmonica on self titled album)
- Chiquita Magic Back And Forth (production)
- Ryan Lerman Emily (writing, bass, keys, aux production)
- CARRTOONS Good Run (Juno) Dial It Back, Spaceships (piano, organ)
- Rich Tennessee Whiskey, I'll Never Love Nobody (production, all instruments)
- Stories Isabelle, Sweet Caroline, Lopin' Along Through The Cosmos, Across The Universe (vocals, piano, organ)
- Madam C. J. Walker (TV series) Madam (bass, wurlitzer, writing)
- Oscar Louis Like Oh (keys, bass, vocoder, production)
- ginla Everything (bass, keys, additional production)
- Dylan Cox A Place to Meet (piano, organ, mellotron on tracks 1–3, 6, 7)
- Bebo Dumont Cronico (organ)
- Bernice We Choose You (vocoder)
- Jesse and Forever Jesse and Forever [album] and Good Morning! (keys, bass, vocals, harmonica, production) I Was Electrocuted... (piano on "Victoria") This Way! A Miracle! (bass, wurli)
- Jesse Scheinin Big Apple Suite (piano, organ, bass, drums)
- Hannah Cohen Welcome Home (rhodes on Holding On, Get in Line, synth on What's This All About)
- Dexter Mason Y-D-K-W and Treefaces (all instruments, production)
- Jennah Bell Can't Be too Careful, Everybody Likes to Party, Green and Blue (organ, wurlitzer)
- Brasstracks Stay There (organ)
- Buz Acres of Diamonds (synths, wurli)
- Melanie Charles Detour Ahead (piano)
- Gatton Ghosts ii (writing)
- Alita Moses Still (production, all instruments except guitar and vocals)
- Angelica Rahe Tqro (production, instruments) Reina (keys)
- Allison Russell 4th Day Prayer (organ)
- Anna Wise Vivre d'amour et d'Eau Fraiche (keys)
- Vince Anthony Innocence and Jasmine Vanilla (keys, aux production)
- Mason Jar Music and Friends Decoration Day Vols. I-IV (organ and piano) 5 Doctors movie score (organ) Scenes (piano on Dancing on the Moon)
- Sid Sriram Entropy (synth bass) It Isn't True (organ)
- Kelsey Waldon Sunday's Children (wurlitzer, organ)
- Liz Vice Save Me (vocoder, piano, organ)
- DMNEJU Used to Her (vocals, bass, production, songwriting)
- Sam O.B. Too Many Humans, Not Enough Souls (vocoder, keys, organ, on tracks 3,9,10)
- Quinn Oulton Clashing Colours Reworked (piano and kick drum)
- Son Of Cloud Son of Cloud, We Are Created By Being Destroyed (keys)
- Space Captain Secret Garden (organ)
- Kami Maltz Perfectly the Same (aux production)
- Leo Sidran Nobody Kisses Anymore (harmonica)
- Ziarra Lover's Lullaby (keys, bgv's)
- Flearoy Old Dog, New Tricks (organ)
- Sarah Walk Secrets (aux production)
- Ajay (keys and additional production on Summer Shade)
- Dylan Cox Animals in the Kitchen (keys)
- Raven Katz Inside Out (piano)
- Scary Pockets Don't Stop Now, Thinking Out Loud (clavinet, aux production)
- Ralph Peterson Jr. ALIVE At Firehouse12 Vol. 1 (organ)
- Jamie Woods Can't Let It Go (organ)
- Gizmo Red Balloon (organ, rhodes)
- Weird Wish Homeowner's Association EP (organ, rhodes, keys)
- Josh Garrells Home (organ, keys)
- Andreas Arnold Vacio (piano and bass)
- Tuck Ryan (organ on Into the Deep)
- Sam Rappaport Bicycle Away (synth solo)
- Bobby Hawk Stronghold (vibes)
- Emily Elbert Evolve (keys and organ)
- Mike Brun There Is No River Strong As Me (keys)
- Anatole Muster Outlook (wurli solo)
- Alli O'Donnell Trout (organ)
- Shilpa Ananth Reproduction (keys on tracks 7, 11, 12)
- Michael Valeanu Hard To Cook (organ)
- David Fiuczynski Flam! (microtonal keyboards, piano)
- Jason Palmer Take a Little Trip (rhodes, piano)
