= Saoko =

2022 single by Rosalía

Single by Rosalía

from the album Motomami
- Language: Spanish
- Released: 4 February 2022
- Recorded: February 2021
- Studio: Electric Lady (New York City); Larrabee (Los Angeles)
- Genre: Alternative reggaeton; experimental
- Length: 2:17
- Label: Columbia
- Composers: Rosalia Vila; David Rodríguez; Dylan Wiggins; Juan Iván Orengo; Juan Luis Morera; Justin Quiles; Michael Uzowuru; Noah Goldstein; Urbani Cedeño
- Lyricists: Rosalia Vila; Juan Luis Morera; Juan Iván Orengo; Urbani Cedeño
- Producers: Rosalía; Noah Goldstein; Sir Dylan; Michael Uzowuru

Rosalía singles chronology
"La Fama" (2021)	"Saoko" (2022)	"Chicken Teriyaki" (2022)

Music video
- "Saoko" on YouTube

"Saoko" (also spelled Såoko) is a song by Spanish singer Rosalía. It was released on 4 February 2022 by Columbia Records as the second single from her third studio album Motomami (2022). The song was written by Rosalía, David Rodríguez, el Kagueto del Guetto, Juan Orengo, Justin Quiles, Michael Uzowuru, Noah Goldstein and Urbani Cedeño. Rosalía, Dylan Wiggins, Goldstein, and Uzowuru also served as producers. With lyrics about transformation and metamorphosis, Rosalía's "Saoko" contains an interpolation of "Saoco" by Wisin and Daddy Yankee. The song's title is a reference to Puerto Rican slang for "outstanding rhythm".

The song was widely acclaimed by music critics, most of whom praised its deconstruction of reggaeton and cyberpunk experimental sounds, stating "the song is more experimental than anything she has recorded before and perhaps her best work yet". The song's accompanying music video, directed by Valentin Petit, was shot in Kyiv, mainly at Podilskyi Bridge. It would go on to win an MTV Video Music Award and a UK Music Video Award.

== Background ==
"Saoko" was first mentioned in November 2021, in a Rolling Stone article by Diego Ortiz that covered the emancipation of Rosalía and the recording process of her album Motomami. It was also revealed to be the opening track of the album. The singer previewed the song on TikTok on 29 December.

Upon unveiling the cover art of the album, the singer announced a new song to be released on 4 February. A teaser of the music video for "Saoko" was posted on 2 February, indicating the release of the song that week.

This song is on FIFA 23's soundtrack, which was released on 30 September 2022. Due to players that pre-ordered the game via Xbox getting access to the game earlier than the official release date accidentally, the entire soundtrack has been leaked early to the game's release, confirming "Saoko" being part of it.

== Composition ==
"Saoko" is an experimental with industrial and reggaeton elements that runs for two minutes and seventeen seconds. Rosalía labeled the process of creating the track's beat "as fun as driving a Lamborghini." It features heavy synthesizers, a distorted piano and traditional reggaeton drums, as well as a ten-second avant-jazz talking interlude between the singer and her team at Electric Lady that was compared to Eddie Palmieri's The Sun of Latin Music (1974). Described by music critics as "bizarre, industrial and psychotic", the song combines influences of Nine Inch Nails' The Downward Spiral (1994), and Kanye West's Yeezus (2013), both of which Rosalía has cited as an artistic inspiration, as well as Arca, who she previously worked with on "KLK". "Saoko" marks the first solo release of Rosalía since "Dolerme".

In an interview with Clash, Rosalía explained that "each and every phrase is an image of transformation. Celebrating transformation, celebrating change. Celebrating that you are always yourself even though you are in constant transformation or even that you are you more than ever at the very moment you are changing". Lyrical references include Frank Ocean, Vivienne Westwood, Lego, and Kim Kardashian, among others.

== Music video ==
Rosalía shared a preview of the music video on 2 February 2022. The video itself premiered on 4 February on YouTube. It was directed by Valentin Petit and produced by Division. It features an all-female professional motorcycle crew. It was filmed over the course of three days in early July 2021 mainly at the Podilskyi Bridge and Naberezhno-Khreschatytska street in Kyiv, Ukraine, as well as in a filming studio nearby. A fictional gas station was set up in the filming studio also using chroma key technique. The music video received comparisons to Spring Breakers, Street Fighter, Fallen Angels, and the music video for "Gasolina".

Style advice was given by Samantha Burkhart, featuring clothes by Jean Paul Gaultier.

For the video, Petit and co-editor Jon Echeveste would go on to win the MTV Video Music Award for Best Editing.

== Personnel ==
Credits adapted from Tidal.

Production

- Rosalia Vila Tobella – composition, songwriting, production, vocal production, vocals, background vocals, handclaps, drums, piano.
- Noah Goldstein – composition, songwriting, production, drums.
- Dylan Wiggins – composition, songwriting, production, piano.
- David Rodríguez – composition, songwriting, recording engineer.
- Justin Rafael Quiles – composition, songwriting
- Michael Uzowuru – composition, production, bass, synthesizer
- Juan Luis Morera – songwriting (sample)
- Urbani Mota Cedeño – songwriting
- Juan Ivan Orengo – songwriting

Technical

- Anthony Vilchis – assistant engineer
- Chris Gehringer – mastering engineer
- Manny Marroquin - mixing engineer
- Zach Peraya – assistant engineer
- Jeremie Inhaber – assistant engineer
- Anthony Vilchis – assistant engineer
- Chris Gehringer – assistant engineer

== Charts ==
Chart performance for "Saoko"
Chart (2022)	Peak position
Global 200 (Billboard)	101
Portugal (AFP)	68
Spain (PROMUSICAE)	5
US Hot Latin Songs (Billboard)	22

== Certifications ==
Certifications for "Saoko"
Region	Certification	Certified units/sales
Brazil (Pro-Música Brasil)	Platinum	40,000^{‡}
Mexico (AMPROFON)	Gold	70,000^{‡}
Spain (Promusicae)	2× Platinum	120,000^{‡}
^{‡} Sales+streaming figures based on certification alone.

== Release history ==
Release history and formats for "Saoko"
Region	Date	Format	Label	Ref.
Various	4 February 2022	Digital download; streaming	Columbia	
