= Noah Goldstein =

American record producer

- Born: Richboro, PA, U.S.
- Genres: Hip hop; R&B; pop; rock; alternative
- Occupations: Record producer; composer; audio engineer; audio mixer
- Years active: 2008–present
- Label: GOOD

Noah Goldstein is an American record producer, songwriter, audio engineer, publisher and film composer. He is known for his work with artists Frank Ocean, Jay-Z, Rosalía, Kanye West, and FKA Twigs. He has produced, written, and engineered on albums including Lux, My Beautiful Dark Twisted Fantasy, Motomami, Yeezus, The Life of Pablo, Blonde, Magdalene, Watch the Throne and many others. He has won multiple Grammy awards for his work.

== Early life ==
Goldstein was born and raised in Philadelphia. He graduated from Temple University with a master's degree in media studies. After graduating in 2006, he did a three-month internship at Greenhouse Studios in Iceland, and then moved to New York. He began working at Electric Lady Studios, where his first session was with Patti Smith.

== Career ==
Goldstein has produced, written, mixed, and engineered on songs and albums including Arcade Fire's Grammy-winning album The Suburbs, Frank Ocean's album Blonde (which Pitchfork named the best album of the 2010s), the single "FourFiveSeconds" by Rihanna, Kanye West and Paul McCartney, Travis Scott's album Rodeo, Anohni's album Hopelessness, and Pusha T's album Daytona, and for artists including Drake, FKA Twigs, Nas, Jay-Z, RZA, and Bon Iver.

In 2010, he began working regularly with Kanye West and GOOD Music as a producer, mixer, and engineer, on albums including Watch the Throne, My Beautiful Dark Twisted Fantasy, Yeezus, The Life of Pablo, Kids See Ghosts, and Ye. Following his departure from West in 2018, Goldstein was named SVP of A&R at Columbia Records. In 2021, he began production on Rosalía's album Motomami.

== Awards ==
Year	Award	Category	Work	Result
2012	Grammy Award	Best Rap Album	My Beautiful Dark Twisted Fantasy by Kanye West	Won
2014	Grammy Award	Best Rap Song	"New Slaves" by Kanye West	Nominated
2015	Grammy Award	Best Rap Song	"Bound 2" by Kanye West	Nominated
2016	Grammy Award	Album of the Year	Beauty Behind the Madness by the Weeknd	Nominated
2016	Grammy Award	Best Rap Song	"All Day" by Kanye West feat. Theophilus London, Allan Kingdom and Paul McCartney	Nominated
2017	Grammy Award	Best Rap Song	"Ultralight Beam" by Kanye West	Nominated
2017	Grammy Award	Best Rap Song	"Famous" by Kanye West	Nominated
2022	Latin Grammy Award	Album of the Year	Motomami by Rosalía	Won
2022	Latin Grammy Award	Best Alternative Music Album	Motomami by Rosalía	Won
2022	Latin Grammy Award	Record of the Year	"La Fama" by Rosalía with the Weeknd	Nominated
2022	Latin Grammy Award	Song of the Year	"Hentai" by Rosalía	Nominated
2022	Latin Grammy Award	Best Alternative Song	"Hentai" by Rosalía	Nominated
2023	Grammy Award	Best Latin Rock or Alternative Album	Motomami by Rosalía	Won

== Discography ==
=== Production credits ===
Year	Artist(s)	Album	Role
2008	Secret Machines	Secret Machines	Engineer
2009	Elvis Perkins	Elvis Perkins in Dearland	Engineer
2009	Lloyd Banks	H.F.M. 2 (The Hunger for More 2)	Engineer
2010	Daniel Merriweather	Love & War	Engineer
2010	Kanye West	My Beautiful Dark Twisted Fantasy	Engineer
2010	T.I.	No Mercy	Engineer
2010	Hole	Nobody's Daughter	Engineer
2010	Arcade Fire	The Suburbs	Engineer
2011	Snoop Dogg	Doggumentary	Engineer
2011	Big Sean	Finally Famous	Vocal engineer, recording
2011	Jay-Z and Kanye West	Watch the Throne	Producer, engineer, mixing
2012	Compilation	Cruel Summer	Producer, engineer, mixing, keyboards, vocals
2012	2 Chainz	Based on a T.R.U. Story	Engineer
2012	DJ Khaled	Kiss the Ring	Engineer
2012	Fun	Some Nights	Engineer
2012	RZA	The Man with the Iron Fists	Engineer
2012	WZRD	WZRD	Engineer, mixing
2013	Big Sean	Hall of Fame	Composer, engineer
2013	John Legend	Love in the Future	Engineer
2013	Pusha T	My Name Is My Name	Engineer, mixing, programming
2013	Kanye West	Yeezus	Producer, engineer, mixing, programming
2014	Future	Honest	Engineer
2014	Rick Ross	Mastermind	Engineer
2014	Kanye West feat. Paul McCartney	"Only One"	Composer, producer
2015	Kanye West	"All Day"	Composer, producer, engineer, mixer
2015	A$AP Rocky	At.Long.Last.A$AP	Engineer
2015	The Weeknd	Beauty Behind the Madness	Engineer
2015	Tyler, the Creator	Cherry Bomb	Engineer
2015	Big Sean	Dark Sky Paradise	Composer, engineer
2015	Paul McCartney, Rihanna, Kanye West	"FourFiveSeconds"	Composer, engineer
2015	Travis Scott	Rodeo	Producer, engineer, composer, mixing
2015	Pusha T	King Push – Darkest Before Dawn: The Prelude	Engineer
2016	Frank Ocean	Endless	Mixing
2016	Frank Ocean	Blonde	Mixing
2016	Gucci Mane	Everybody Looking	Engineer
2016	Kanye West	The Life of Pablo	Producer, composer, engineer
2016	Schoolboy Q	Blank Face LP	Engineer, composer
2016	Sia	This Is Acting	Composer, producer
2017	Drake	More Life	Composer
2018	Kids See Ghosts	Kids See Ghosts	Producer, engineer
2018	Teyana Taylor	K.T.S.E.	Composer
2018	Christina Aguilera	Liberation	Composer, engineer, producer
2018	Nas	Nasir	Producer, composer, engineer
2018	Swizz Beats	Poison	Engineer
2018	Muse	Simulation Theory	Producer
2018	Kanye West	Ye	Producer, composer, engineer
2019	Bon Iver	I, I	Composer, engineer
2019	FKA Twigs	Magdalene	Producer, composer, engineer
2019	Dirty Projectors	Sing the Melody	Composer
2019	Frank Ocean	"DHL"	Producer
2021	Why Don't We	The Good Times and the Bad Ones	Composer
2022	Denzel Curry	Melt My Eyez See Your Future	Producer
2022	Omar Apollo	Ivory	Producer, composer
2022	Rosalía	Motomami	Producer, composer
2023	Rosalía and Rauw Alejandro	RR	Producer
2023	Yves Tumor	Praise a Lord Who Chews but Which Does Not Consume; (Or Simply, Hot Between Worlds)	Producer, composer
2023	Travis Scott	Utopia	Producer
2025
2025	Kid Cudi	Free	Programming
2025	Rosalía	Lux	Producer, composer
