= Candy (Rosalía song) =

2022 song by Rosalía

Promotional single by Rosalía

from the album Motomami
- Language: Spanish
- Released: 18 March 2022
- Recorded: 2020
- Studio: Angel Sound (Barcelona); Dejavú Apartment (Los Angeles); Motomami House (Miami); Larrabee (Los Angeles); Kiss the Chief (Miami)
- Genre: Reggaeton
- Length: 3:13
- Label: Columbia
- Composers: Rosalia Vila; Pablo Díaz-Reixa; Adam Feeney; Kaan Güneşberk; David Rodríguez; William Bevan; LaShawn Daniels; Fred Jerkins III; Rodney Jerkins; William Ray Norwood, Jr.
- Lyricist: Rosalia Vila
- Producers: Rosalía; El Guincho; Frank Dukes; Noah Goldstein; Michael Uzowuru; Tainy

Music video
- "Candy" on YouTube

"Candy" (stylized in all caps) is a song recorded by Spanish singer and songwriter Rosalía. It was released on 18 March 2022 through Columbia Records as a promotional single from her third studio album Motomami (2022). The song was written and produced by Rosalía herself alongside El Guincho, Frank Dukes, Noah Goldstein, Michael Uzowuru and Tainy.

"Candy" is a mid-tempo reggaeton track featuring pop and electropop elements, filtered instrumentation and light vocals. The song title references the 2014 track of the same name, by Puerto Rican duo Plan B. "Candy" samples "Archangel", performed by Burial, which samples "One Wish", performed by Ray J.

An accompanying music video for "Candy" filmed in Shibuya, Japan and inspired by Sofia Coppola's Lost In Translation was shared on YouTube upon the release of Motomami. Commercially, "Candy" entered major market charts including the Argentina Hot 100, Swiss Hitparade, and the Billboard Hot Latin Songs, and became the singer's eighth number one single on the PROMUSICAE chart in Spain. A remix featuring Chencho Corleone of Plan B was included in the deluxe version of the album, released later that year.

== Background ==
In November 2018, Rosalía released her second studio album El Mal Querer, which she wrote and co-produced with el Guincho, her long-time collaborator. The album reimagines the folk and flamenco sound of Rosalía's previous album, Los Ángeles (2017), by mixing it with elements of radio-friendly pop and urban crossover in an experimental key. Rosalía would expand her horizons and venture in reggaeton the following year, reaching mainstream audiences worldwide with songs like "Con Altura" or "Yo x Ti, Tu x Mi".

On El Mal Querer's follow-up Motomami, Rosalía aimed to experiment beyond her earlier albums' new flamenco sound. Initially planning to confect four different projects, Rosalía committed to a color palette at the sound level. "Candy" is one of the many songs Rosalía wrote during her time in the United States in the outbreak of the COVID-19 pandemic before starting a nine-month mixing and mastering process in Los Angeles. The song's original working name was "Olvidao". Rosalía ended co-producing the song as well as any other track on the album. "Candy" was recorded by engineers and songwriters David Rodríguez, Sean Matsukawa and Tyler Murphy; and mixed by Manny Marroquín at Larrabee, in Hollywood. Chris Gehringer mastered the track in New Jersey. Rosalía first teased "Candy" on TikTok on 31 December 2021 to great reception from fans.

== Music video ==
Rosalía announced the release of a music video for "Candy" during an interview on El Hormiguero on 17 March 2022 and shared a preview. It was released the following day on digital platforms. The music video was produced and directed by Stillz and filmed in Shibuya, a special ward in Tokyo, Japan. Heavily inspired in the 2003 film Lost in Translation, it sees the singer in a short pink wig and American model Alton Mason at a karaoke bar. In the music video, Rosalía wears a tight blue dress personally designed by late American fashion designer Virgil Abloh in July 2021, one of his lasts creations before his death later that year.

== Remix ==
A remix of "Candy" featuring Plan B's Chencho Corleone was released on 9 September 2022 as part of the bonus tracks on the deluxe edition of Motomami.

== Personnel ==
Credits adapted from the liner notes of Motomami.

Publishing

- Published by Songs of Universal, Inc. O/b/O itself and La Guantera Publishing (BMI) / WC Music Corp. (ASCAP) O/b/O Warner/Chappell Music Spain S.A. and RICO Publishing / Domino Publishing Company of America, Inc. / EMI April Music Inc. O/b/O itself, The Book Productions LLC, and LaShawn Daniels Productions, Inc. (ASCAP) / Sony/ATV Music Publishing / Sony/ATV Melody O/b/O itself and Fred Jerkins Publishing (ASCAP) / EMI Blackwood Music Inc. O/b/O itself, Quiet As Kept Music Inc., EMI Music Publishing Ltd., and Rodney Jerkins Productions, Inc. (BMI) / Kaan Gunesberk Publishing Designee / BMG Rights Management
- Recorded by David Rodríguez, Sean Matsukawa and Tyler Murphy at Angel Sound in Barcelona, Dejavú Apartment in Los Angeles, Motomami House and Kiss the Chief in Miami, and Larrabee in North Hollywood.
- Mixed by Manny Marroquín at Larrabee Studio, West Hollywood, California.
- Mastered by Chris Gehringer at Sterling Sound, Edgewater, New Jersey.

Production personnel

- Rosalía Vila – production, lyrics, composition, vocal production; vocals, background vocals, vocal arrangement.
- El Guincho – production, composition; drums, synthesizer
- Frank Dukes – production, composition; synthesizer
- Kaan Günesberk – composition; synthesizer
- Noah Goldstein – production, vocal production; 808, drums
- Tainy – production; drums
- Michael Uzowuru – production
- David Rodríguez – composition

Technical personnel

- Manny Marroquin – mixing
- Zach Peraya – assistant mix engineer
- Jeremie Inhaber – assistant mix engineer
- Anthony Vilchis – assistant mix engineer
- Chris Gehringer – mastering

== Charts ==
Chart performance for "Candy"
Chart (2022)	Peak position
Argentina (Argentina Hot 100)	94
Global 200 (Billboard)	72
Global Excl. US (Billboard)	59
Mexico Airplay (Billboard)	10
Portugal (AFP)	97
Spain (PROMUSICAE)	1
Spain Songs (Billboard)	2
Switzerland (Swiss Hitparade)	83
US Hot Latin Songs (Billboard)	20

== Certifications ==
Certifications for "Candy"
Region	Certification	Certified units/sales
Mexico (AMPROFON)	Gold	70,000^{‡}
Spain (Promusicae)	2× Platinum	200,000^{‡}
^{‡} Sales+streaming figures based on certification alone.

== Release history ==
Release history and formats for "Candy"
Region	Date	Format	Version	Label
Various	18 March 2022	Digital download; streaming	Solo	Columbia
Various	9 September 2022	Digital download; streaming	Remix	Columbia
