= La Fama (song) =

2021 single by Rosalía featuring the Weeknd

Single by Rosalía featuring the Weeknd

from the album Motomami
- Language: Spanish
- Released: 11 November 2021
- Recorded: December 2018, January 2020
- Studio: Dejavú Apartment (Los Angeles); Kingsway (Los Angeles); Larrabee (Los Angeles); Motomami House (Miami); Kiss the Chief (Miami)
- Genre: Bachata
- Length: 3:08
- Label: Columbia
- Composers: Rosalia Vila; Abel Tesfaye; Adam Feeney; Marco Masís; Alejandro Ramírez; Pablo Díaz-Reixa; David Rodríguez; Dylan Wiggins; Noah Goldstein
- Lyricist: Rosalia Vila
- Producers: Rosalía; the Weeknd; Frank Dukes; Tainy; Sky Rompiendo; El Guincho; Noah Goldstein; Sir Dylan

Rosalía singles chronology
"Linda" (2021)	"La Fama" (2021)	"Saoko" (2022)

The Weeknd singles chronology
"One Right Now" (2021)	"La Fama" (2021)	"Tears in the Club" (2021)

Music video
- "La Fama" on YouTube

"La Fama" (English: "The Fame") is a song recorded by Spanish singer Rosalía featuring Canadian singer the Weeknd. It was released on 11 November 2021 by Columbia Records as the lead single from Rosalía's third studio album, Motomami (2022). The song was written and produced by both performers alongside El Guincho, Frank Dukes, Noah Goldstein, Sir Dylan, Sky Rompiendo and Tainy.

"La Fama" is a mid-tempo non-guitar driven bachata track with electropop and experimental elements. Its lyrics see Rosalía describing the seductions of fame as well as its superficiality and emptiness. The song was met with generally positive reviews from music critics, who embraced its challenging way to produce bachata without its characteristic acoustic guitar. It received a nomination for Record of the Year at the 23rd Annual Latin Grammy Awards. The song's music video, directed by Director X and inspired by Robert Rodríguez' From Dusk till Dawn, accompanied the song's release, and depicts Rosalía as a bloodstone vedette.

Commercially, "La Fama" debuted atop the PROMUSICAE chart in Spain, becoming Rosalía's seventh number-one single in her home country and the Weeknd's first. Elsewhere, the song entered the top ten charts in Belgium, France, Mexico, Bulgaria, Panama, El Salvador and the US Hot Latin Songs. It also entered the Billboard Hot 100 and the Global 200, peaking at 94 and 34 respectively.

== Background ==
On 2 November 2021, to celebrate the three-year anniversary of the release of her second studio album El Mal Querer (2018), Rosalía revealed that her upcoming third studio album Motomami would be released in 2022. Earlier in October, during a meet and greet in Mexico, Rosalía revealed that the lead single from Motomami would be released in November. Later in the month, she posted a snippet of a then-unreleased song on her TikTok account.

On 8 November 2021, multiple advertisements were spotted in Buenos Aires that revealed the name of the single was "La Fama". It was also announced that the song would feature the Weeknd and that it was set to be released on 11 November. Later in the day, Rosalía unveiled the trailer for the song's music video. This marked the second collaboration between Rosalía and the Weeknd, following the remix of the Weeknd's 2019 single "Blinding Lights".

== Composition and reception ==
"La Fama" is a mid-tempo bachata track with electropop influences. In a statement for Rolling Stone, Rosalía noted that she "wanted to write, in my own way, a bachata with a little story around ambition. The challenge was also to compose a bachata song without using a guitar, which was able by chopping my voice. Taking as a reference the lyrics of Rubén Blades or Patti Smith and the songs of Aventura, I ended up writing a story of romance with fame." She also stated for Zane Lowe on Apple Music 1 that, after expressing her aim to write a bachata track, Romeo Santos reached out to the singer and sent her an extense playlist. The composition of "La Fama" began in 2018 and was intended to be solo. However, the Weeknd hopped on the song in early 2020, before the recording of the "Blinding Lights" remix.

Although generally well received by music journalists and fans, "La Fama" attracted criticism from several audiences who accused Rosalía of cultural appropriation for adopting bachata, a genre originated in the Dominican Republic. They also took issue with the Weeknd's feature, citing his Canadian origin and opining that a Spanish-speaking feature would have fitted better.

== Music video ==
The music video for "La Fama", directed by Director X, who also directed the music video for Rosalía and J Balvin's "Con Altura", premiered on 11 November 2021 alongside the single's release. Filmed at the Aurora Banquet Hall in Tujunga, California, it features a cameo appearance from actor Danny Trejo and is heavily inspired by the 1996 horror cult film From Dusk till Dawn. The typography featured in the video was inspired by the 1996 slasher film Scream.

In the video, Rosalía, introduced by Trejo, performs at a dimly lit nightclub as "La Fama". She wanders out to the crowd until she notices the Weeknd sitting alone watching her performance. She seduces him onto the stage, where they embrace before Rosalía stabs him with a hidden knife. She continues her performance while the Weeknd perishes. In the end, the audience applauds enthusiastically as Trejo is heard off-screen saying, "Be careful what you wish for".

== Accolades ==
Awards and nominations for "La Fama"
Year	Organization	Award	Result
2022	Heat Latin Music Awards	Best Music Video	Nominated
2022	Latin Grammy Awards	Record of the Year	Nominated
2022	LOS40 Music Awards	Best Spanish Song	Nominated
2022	LOS40 Music Awards	Best Collaboration	Nominated
2022	MTV Millennial Awards	Ship of the Year	Nominated
2022	MTV Video Music Awards	Best Collaboration	Nominated
2022	NRJ Music Awards	International Collaboration of the Year	Nominated
2022	Premios Juventud	OMG Collaboration	Nominated
2022	Premios Odeón	Song of the Year	Nominated
2022	Premios Odeón	Best Pop Song	Nominated
2022	Premios Tu Música Urbano	Best Crossover Song	Nominated
2022	Premios Tu Música Urbano	Video of the Year	Nominated
2023	Latin American Music Awards	Collaboration Crossover of the Year	Won
2023	Premio Lo Nuestro	Collaboration Crossover of the Year	Won

== Personnel ==
Credits adapted from the liner notes of Motomami.

Publishing

- Published by Songs of Universal, Inc. O/b/O itself and La Guantera Publishing (BMI) / KMR Music Royalties, admin. by Kobalt Songs Music Publishing (ASCAP) / Noah Goldstein Music (ASCAP) / EMI April Music Inc. (ASCAP) O/b/O itself EMI Music Publishing Ltd. and Nylan King Music Ltd. (PRS) / Sony/ATV Discos Music Publishing LLC (ASCAP) / EMI Blackwood Music Inc. (BMI) / WC Music Cop. (ASCAP) O/b/O Warner/Chappell Music Spain S.A. and RICO Publishing / Sony/ATV Ballad (BMI)
- Recorded by David Rodríguez, Tyler Murphy and Shin Kamiyama.
- Mixed by Manny Marroquín at Larrabee Studio, West Hollywood, California.
- Mastered by Chris Gehringer at Sterling Sound, Edgewater, New Jersey.

Production personnel

- Rosalía Vila – production, lyrics, composition, vocal production; vocals, vocal arrangement.
- The Weeknd – production, composition; vocals
- Dylan Patrice – production, composition, vocal production; vocal arrangement, bass, synthesizer
- Noah Goldstein – production, composition, vocal production; vocal arrangement
- Frank Dukes – production, composition; synthesizer, vocal arrangement
- El Guincho – production, composition; drums, synthesizer
- Roland García – additional production; drums, percussion
- Tainy – production; bass
- Sky Rompiendo – production
- Caroline Shaw – vocal arrangement
- Jean Rodríguez – vocal production
- LA Session Singers: choir, background vocals

Technical personnel

- Manny Marroquin – mixing
- Zach Peraya – assistant mix engineer
- Jeremie Inhaber – assistant mix engineer
- Anthony Vilchis – assistant mix engineer
- Chris Gehringer – mastering

== Charts ==
=== Weekly charts ===
Weekly chart performance for "La Fama"
Chart (2021–2022)	Peak position
Argentina Hot 100 (Billboard)	73
Belgium (Ultratop 50 Wallonia)	4
Bulgaria (PROPHON)	6
Canada Hot 100 (Billboard)	86
Colombia (National-Report)	56
Ecuador (National-Report)	28
El Salvador (ASAP EGC)	10
France (SNEP)	5
Global 200 (Billboard)	34
Greece (IFPI)	31
Ireland (IRMA)	73
Italy (FIMI)	86
Lithuania (AGATA)	45
Luxembourg (Billboard)	19
Mexico (Billboard Mexican Airplay)	2
New Zealand Hot Singles (RMNZ)	30
Panama (Monitor Latino)	7
Peru (UNIMPRO)	49
Portugal (AFP)	29
Spain (Promusicae)	1
Sweden Heatseeker (Sverigetopplistan)	16
Switzerland (Schweizer Hitparade)	15
US Billboard Hot 100	94
US Hot Latin Songs (Billboard)	2
US Latin Airplay (Billboard)	1
US Tropical Airplay (Billboard)	1

=== Year-end charts ===
2021 year-end chart performance for "La Fama"
Chart (2021)	Position
Spain (PROMUSICAE)	98

2022 year-end chart performance for "La Fama"
Chart (2022)	Position
Belgium (Ultratop Flanders)	150
Belgium (Ultratop Wallonia)	9
France (SNEP)	11
Global Excl. US (Billboard)	160
Switzerland (Schweizer Hitparade)	55

== Certifications ==
Certifications for "La Fama"
Region	Certification	Certified units/sales
Brazil (Pro-Música Brasil)	Gold	20,000^{‡}
Canada (Music Canada)	Gold	40,000^{‡}
France (SNEP)	Diamond	333,333^{‡}
Italy (FIMI)	Platinum	100,000^{‡}
Mexico (AMPROFON)	2× Platinum	280,000^{‡}
Poland (ZPAV)	Gold	25,000^{‡}
Portugal (AFP)	Platinum	10,000^{‡}
Spain (Promusicae)	5× Platinum	300,000^{‡}
Switzerland (IFPI Switzerland)	Platinum	20,000^{‡}
United States (RIAA)	Platinum	1,000,000^{‡}
Streaming
Chile (Profovi)	Gold	10,285,250
^{‡} Sales+streaming figures based on certification alone.

== Release history ==
Release history and formats for "La Fama"
Country	Date	Format	Label	Ref.
Various	11 November 2021	Digital download; streaming	Columbia	
Italy	19 November 2021	Contemporary hit radio	Sony	

== See also ==
- List of Billboard Hot Latin Songs and Latin Airplay number ones of 2022
