= Chicken Teriyaki (song) =

2022 single by Rosalía

Single by Rosalía

from the album Motomami
- Language: Spanish
- Released: 24 February 2022
- Studio: Electric Lady (New York City)
- Genre: Reggaeton
- Length: 2:02
- Label: Columbia
- Composers: Rosalía; Alejandro Ramírez; David Rodríguez; Kamaal Fareed; Michael Uzowuru; Pablo Díaz-Reixa
- Lyricists: Rosalia Vila; Raúl Alejandro Ocasio Ruiz
- Producers: Rosalía; El Guincho; Sky Rompiendo; Michael Uzowuru; Noah Goldstein

Rosalía singles chronology
| "Saoko" (2022) | "Chicken Teriyaki" (2022) | "Despechá" (2022) |

Music video
- "Chicken Teriyaki" on YouTube

"Chicken Teriyaki" is a song by Spanish singer Rosalía. It was released on 24 February 2022 by Columbia Records as the third single from her third studio album Motomami (2022). The song was written by Rosalía, Raúl Alejandro, Qukaracho, Kamaal Fareed, El Guincho, Michael Uzowuru, and Sky Rompiendo, with the last three also serving as producers alongside the performer and Noah Goldstein.

The song was commercially successful across some Hispanoamerican countries such as El Salvador, Guatemala and Peru where "Chicken Teriyaki" placed between the first ten positions of their charts. Elsewhere the single charted in Spain, Portugal and some other countries.

== Background ==
Rosalía teased "Chicken Teriyaki" for the first time through TikTok on 16 February and confirmed its release as a promotional single the week after.

== Composition ==
"Chicken Teriyaki" is a "difficult, enjoyment social gathering" mid-tempo "TikTok-ready" reggaeton track that runs for two minutes and two seconds. Conceived at the Mercer Hotel in New York City and later recorded at Electric Lady, the song talks about a trip to the city through "ironic lyrics". The concept of the song was mainly inspired in the 1981 painting Arroz con Pollo by Jean-Michel Basquiat. Talking to Apple Music 1, Rosalía stated that she was "just having fun" making the record. Lyrical references include Julio Iglesias, Mike Dean, and Naomi Campbell, among others.

== Music video ==
Rosalía shared a preview of the music video on 23 February 2022. The video itself premiered on 24 February on YouTube. It was directed by Tanu Muino and produced by UnderWonder Content in partnership with Canada, marking the second collaboration between the singer and Muino after "Juro Que". It was filmed in a single day in a dancing studio in Madrid in November 2021. It features a red-haired Rosalía in a dancing studio with a large amount of dancers, mostly women. Natalia Palomares served as the choreographer. It received comparisons to Gaspar Noé's Climax and Pedro Almodóvar.

== Personnel ==
Credits adapted from Tidal.

Production

- Rosalia Vila Tobella – composition, songwriting, production, vocal production, vocals, drums
- Alejandro Ramírez – composition, songwriting, production, drums
- David Rodríguez – composition, songwriting, recording engineer
- Michael Uzowuru – composition, songwriting, production
- El Guincho – composition, songwriting, production
- Kamaal Fareed – songwriting, background vocals
- Raúl Alejandro Ocasio – songwriting
- Noah Goldstein – additional production

Technical

- Anthony Vilchis – assistant engineer
- Chris Gehringer – mastering engineer
- Manny Marroquin - mixing engineer
- Zach Peraya – assistant engineer
- Jeremie Inhaber – assistant engineer
- Anthony Vilchis – assistant engineer
- Chris Gehringer – assistant engineer

== Charts ==
Chart performance for "Chicken Teriyaki"
| Chart (2022) | Peak position |
|---|---|
| Ecuador (Monitor Latino) | 18 |
| El Salvador (Monitor Latino) | 4 |
| Global 200 (Billboard) | 72 |
| Guatemala (Monitor Latino) | 10 |
| Mexico (Billboard Mexican Airplay) | 39 |
| Panama (Monitor Latino) | 16 |
| Peru (Monitor Latino) | 9 |
| Portugal (AFP) | 97 |
| Spain (PROMUSICAE) | 11 |
| Spain Songs (Billboard) | 1 |
| US Hot Latin Songs (Billboard) | 20 |

== Certifications ==
Certifications for "Chicken Teriyaki"
| Region | Certification | Certified units/sales |
|---|---|---|
| Brazil (Pro-Música Brasil) | Gold | 20,000^{‡} |
| Mexico (AMPROFON) | Gold | 70,000^{‡} |
| Spain (Promusicae) | Platinum | 60,000^{‡} |
^{‡} Sales+streaming figures based on certification alone.

== Release history ==
Release history and formats for "Chicken Teriyaki"
| Region | Date | Format | Label | Ref. |
|---|---|---|---|---|
| Various | 24 February 2022 | Digital download; streaming | Columbia | |
| Italy | 1 March 2022 | Contemporary hit radio | Sony | |
