= Hentai (song) =

Promotional single by Rosalía

from the album Motomami
- Released: 16 March 2022
- Studio: The Library Room (Miami); Electric Lady (New York City); Motomami House (Miami); Larrabee (Hollywood)
- Genre: Art pop
- Length: 2:42
- Label: Columbia
- Composers: Rosalia Vila; Pharrell Williams; Chad Hugo; Michael Uzowuru; Larry Gold; Noah Goldstein; Dylan Wiggins; Jacob Sherman; David Rodríguez
- Lyricists: Rosalia Vila; Pharrell Williams; Pilar Vila
- Producers: Rosalia Vila; Pharrell Williams; Michael Uzowuru; Noah Goldstein

Music video
- "Hentai" on YouTube

"Hentai" is a song recorded by Spanish singer and songwriter Rosalía. Written by Rosalía, sister Pilar Vila and Pharrell Williams with additional production by Michael Uzowuru and Noah Goldstein, it was released as a promotional single of Rosalía's third studio album Motomami through Columbia Records on 16 March 2022. "Hentai" is a delicate piano ballad with pulsing electronic beats that explores the pleasures of sexual intercourse and female sexuality. The song's lyricism earned a Latin Grammy nomination for Song of the Year and Best Alternative Song.

Despite initial backlash surrounding its sexual content and "kitch" lyricism earlier that year, "Hentai" received critical praise once fully released, with compliments directed towards the contrast between its explicit lyrics and soft melody. An accompanying music video filmed in Ukraine and directed by Mitch Ryan, premiered on YouTube on release day. Despite not being promoted as a radio single, the song peaked at number seven on the PROMUSICAE chart in Spain while also entering the charts in Portugal and the Billboard Global Excl. U.S.

== Background ==
In November 2018, Rosalía released her second studio album El Mal Querer, which she wrote and co-produced with El Guincho, her long-time collaborator. The album reimagines the folk and flamenco sound of Rosalía's previous album, Los Ángeles (2017), by mixing it with elements of radio-friendly pop and urban crossover in an experimental key. Rosalía would expand her horizons and venture in reggaeton the following year, reaching mainstream audiences worldwide with songs like "Con altura" or "Yo x Ti, Tu x Mi".

On El Mal Querer's follow-up Motomami, Rosalía aimed to experiment beyond her earlier albums' new flamenco sound. Initially planning to confect four different projects, Rosalía committed to a color palette at the sound level, which resulted in Motomami. "Hentai" is one of the many songs Rosalía wrote during COVID-19 lockdown in Miami, before starting a nine-month mixing and mastering process in Los Angeles. Rosalía first teased "Hentai" on TikTok on 16 January 2022 with a video filmed by partner Rauw Alejandro in a chairlift in the Pyrenean ski resort of Baqueira-Beret. The video received backlash due to its lyrics, with many users complaining about the downgrade of her writing skills, often comparing them to those in the era of El Mal Querer. Despite vast online criticism the singer continued teasing the track. On 13 March she posted yet another TikTok video where she read the song's lyrics as a poem, also announcing that the song would be released on 16 March.

== Composition ==
"Hentai" is an art pop song in form of a piano ballad separated in big intervals as the early compositions of Frank Sinatra. It circles a collection of four looping chords played mainly by Jacob Sherman that run for two minutes and forty-two seconds. The song ends with a deconstructed reggaeton drum resembling a gunshot choir on the post-chorus. The initial version of "Hentai", however, was completely driven by violin strings. Those strings, played by Larry Gold, can be heard in the background for a little over a dozen seconds in the final version. Praised by Rolling Stone for "embracing the simple, straightforward pleasures of sex, toying with expectations and contrasts while subverting the kind of lyrics that men get away with all the time", the explicitness of the lyrics contrast the delicacy of the Cinderella-inspired melody. The vocal performance in "Hentai" has been compared to those of Judy Garland and Audrey Hepburn while the song's intention drew comparisons to Ariana Grande's "34+35". Lyrical references include Spike Jonze.

The title references the triple-X manga of the same name as an alternative form of mentioning sex as "it is more interesting than conventional pornography due to the fact that it is a drawing". Melodic inspirations also include Richard Rodgers, Oscar Hammerstein II, Leonard Cohen, Frank Sinatra, Lil' Kim, Bill Evans, Ilene Woods, Björk and Madonna.

== Music video ==
Rosalía shared a preview of the music video on 15 March 2022. The video itself, directed by Mitch Ryan and produced by Shotclock, premiered on 16 March on YouTube. It features Rosalía in several locations in the Ukrainian countryside riding a mechanical bull, including a hippodrome. It was filmed over the course of two days in late September 2021 in Ukraine.

== Credits and personnel ==
Credits adapted from the liner notes of Motomami.

Publishing

- Published by Songs of Universal, Inc. o/b/o itself and La Guantera Publishing (BMI) / EMI Pop Publishing o/b/o itself and More Water From Nazareth (GMR) / Universal Music Corp. o/b/o itself and Beyond Category LLC (BMI) / Maird Music Through (BMI) / Noah Goldstein Music (ASCAP) / Sony/ATV Ballad (BMI) / Jake Sherman Songs (BMI) / Pilar Vila Tobella Publishing Designee (SGAE)
- Recorded by David Rodríguez and Michael Larson at The Library Room (Miami, Florida); Electric Lady (New York City), Motomami House (Miami) and Larrabee Studios (North Hollywood, California)
- Mixed by Manny Marroquín at Larrabee Studio, North Hollywood, California.
- Mastered by Chris Gehringer at Sterling Sound, Edgewater, New Jersey.

Production personnel

- Rosalía Vila – production, lyrics, composition; vocals, piano, drums, vocal arrangement.
- Pharrell Williams – production, lyrics, composition,
- Michael Uzowuru – production, composition, drums
- Noah Goldstein – production, composition, bass
- Dylan Patrice – composition, piano, bass, additional production
- Chad Hugo – composition
- David Rodríguez – composition
- Pilar Vila – lyrics
- Jacob Sherman – piano
- Larry Gold – strings

Technical personnel

- Manny Marroquin – mixing
- Zach Peraya – assistant mix engineer
- Jeremie Inhaber – assistant mix engineer
- Anthony Vilchis – assistant mix engineer
- Chris Gehringer – mastering

== Charts ==
Chart (2022)	Peak position
Global Excl. US (Billboard)	168
Portugal (AFP)	110
Spain (PROMUSICAE)	7

== Release history ==
Country	Date	Format	Label	Ref
Various	16 March 2022	Digital download; streaming	Columbia	
