= List of awards and nominations received by Rosalía =

Rosalía awards and nominations
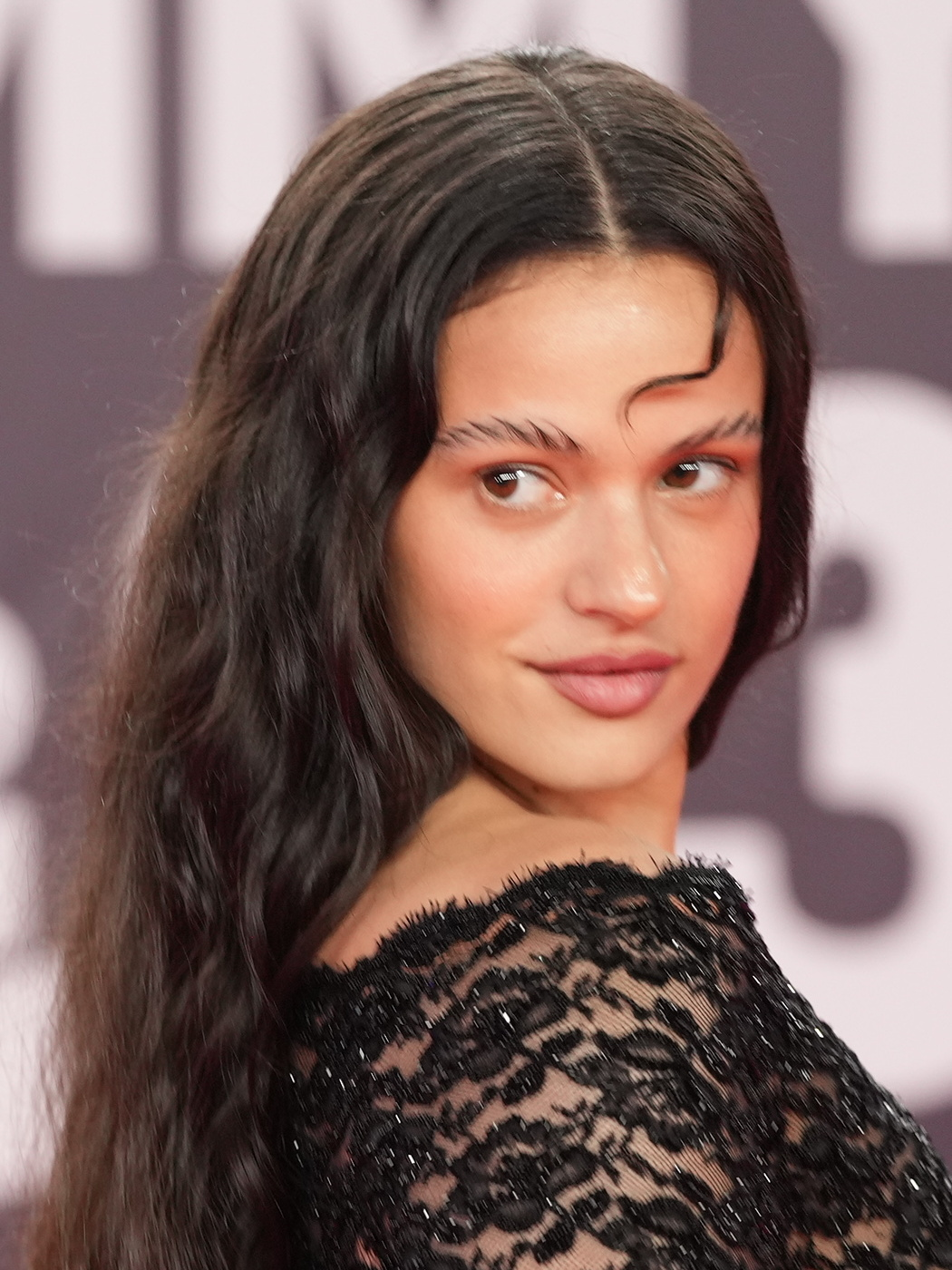
- Rosalía in 2023
Awards and nominations
Award	Wins	Nominations
American Music Awards	0	8
Billboard Latin Music Awards	4	21
Billboard Music Awards	0	3
Brit Awards	1	1
Grammy Awards	2	13
iHeartRadio Music Awards	1	3
Latin American Music Awards	2	14
Latin Grammy Awards	16	31
Los 40 Music Awards	10	21
MTV Europe Music Awards	2	14
MTV Video Music Awards	4	11
NRJ Music Awards	1	4
Premios Juventud	6	31
Premio Lo Nuestro	4	22
Premios Odeón	5	13
UK Music Video Awards	5	16

Totals (Note: Certain award groups do not simply award one winner. They acknowledge several different recipients, have runners-up, and have third place. Since this is a specific recognition and is different from losing an award, runner-up mentions are considered wins in this award tally. For simplification and to avoid errors, each award in this list has been presumed to have had a prior nomination.)
- Wins: 212
- Nominations: 539

Spanish singer and songwriter Rosalía has received several awards and nominations, including two Grammy Awards, sixteen Latin Grammy Awards, one Brit Award, four MTV Video Music Awards, and two MTV Europe Music Awards. In 2017, she released her first studio album Los Ángeles, which gave her a nomination for Best New Artist at the 18th Annual Latin Grammy Awards.

In 2018, she released her second studio album El Mal Querer to critical acclaim; the album won Best Latin Rock, Urban or Alternative Album at the 62nd Annual Grammy Awards, where she also was nominated for Best New Artist (being the first Spanish-language artist to be nominated for the award), while at the 20th Annual Latin Grammy Awards, it was awarded Best Contemporary Pop Vocal Album and Album of the Year, becoming the third solo female artist to win the latter in the history of the awards. Rosalía is the first, and to date only, artist to have been nominated for Best New Artist at both the Grammy Awards and Latin Grammy Awards. For "Malamente", the lead single of the album, she won Latin Grammys for Best Alternative Song and Best Urban Fusion/Performance in addition to nominations for both Song of the Year and Record of the Year.

In 2019, she released "Con Altura" alongside Colombian singer J Balvin and Spanish musician El Guincho; the song became a commercial success and received several awards, including the Latin Grammy Award for Best Urban Song, the MTV Video Music Award for Best Latin and Best Choreography, and the MTV Europe Music Award for Best Collaboration. Also in 2019, she collaborated with Puerto Rican singer Ozuna in "Yo x Ti, Tu x Mi"; the song won Best Urban Song and Best Urban Fusion/Performance at the 21st Annual Latin Grammy Awards. At the 2020 ceremony, she also won Best Short Form Music Video for "TKN", a song with American rapper Travis Scott.

In 2022, she released her third studio album Motomami to critical acclaim as well as significant commercial success compared to her previous efforts. At the 23rd Annual Latin Grammy Awards, the album won Album of the Year and Best Alternative Music Album, making Rosalía the first female artist to win the former category more than once. In addition, the lead single "La Fama" was nominated for Record of the Year, whereas the promotional single "Hentai" was nominated for Song of the Year, Best Alternative Song, and Best Short Form Video. The album also gave Rosalía her second Grammy Award, winning Best Latin Rock or Alternative Album in 2023. The second single "Saoko" also won Best Editing at the 2022 MTV Video Music Awards.

In 2025, she released her fourth studio album Lux to unanimous critical acclaim and strong commercial performance in English-speaking and German-speaking countries. In the UK, she was awarded the Brit Award for International Artist at the Brit Awards 2026 and International Songwriter of the Year at the Ivor Novello Awards later the same year. At the 27th Annual Latin Grammy Awards, Lux won six out of its eight nominations, making Rosalía the first female artist to win Album of the Year three times and the most awarded female artist in a single night.

== Awards and nominations ==
Award	Year (Note: Indicates the year of ceremony. Each year is linked to the article about the awards held that year, wherever possible.)	Recipient(s) and nominee(s)	Category	Result	Ref.
AICP Awards	2026	"Berghain" (with Björk and Yves Tumor)	Music Video	Won	
AIM Independent Music Awards	2024	"Oral" (Olof Dreijer Remix) (featuring Björk)	Best Independent Remix	Nominated	
American Music Awards	2020	Herself	Favorite Female Artist - Latin	Nominated	
American Music Awards	2021	Herself	Favorite Female Artist - Latin	Nominated	
American Music Awards	2021	"La Noche de Anoche" (with Bad Bunny)	Favorite Latin Song	Nominated	
American Music Awards	2022	Herself	Favorite Female Artist - Latin	Nominated	
American Music Awards	2022	Motomami	Favorite Album - Latin	Nominated	
American Music Awards	2026	"Berghain" (with Björk and Yves Tumor)	Best Music Video	Nominated	
American Music Awards	2026	Herself	Best Female Latin Artist	Nominated	
American Music Awards	2026	Lux	Best Latin Album	Nominated	
ASCAP Latin Awards	2020	"Con Altura" (with J Balvin featuring El Guincho)	Winning Songs	Won	
ASCAP Latin Awards	2020	"Yo x Ti, Tu x Mi" (with Ozuna)	Winning Songs	Won	
ASCAP Latin Awards	2022	"La Noche de Anoche" (with Bad Bunny)	Winning Songs	Won	
ASCAP Latin Awards	2022	"Relación (Remix)" (with Sech, Daddy Yankee, J Balvin, & Farruko)	Winning Songs	Won	
ASCAP Latin Awards	2023	"Despechá"	Winning Songs	Won	
ASCAP Latin Awards	2023	"La Fama" (with The Weeknd)	Winning Songs	Won	
ASCAP Latin Awards	2024	"El Pañuelo" (with Romeo Santos)	Winning Songs	Won	
Asian Pop Music Awards	2024	"New Woman" (with Lisa)	Best Collaboration (Overseas)	Nominated	
BBC Sound Of...	2019	Herself	Sound of 2019	Nominated	
Berlin Commercial Awards	2019	"De aquí no sales"	Music Video	Nominated	
Berlin Commercial Awards	2019	"De aquí no sales"	Craft: Hair & Make Up	Won	
Berlin Commercial Awards	2019	"De aquí no sales"	Craft: Direction	Nominated	
Berlin Commercial Awards	2019	"De aquí no sales"	Craft: VFX	Nominated	
Berlin Commercial Awards	2020	"TKN" (with Travis Scott)	Best Music Video	Nominated	
Berlin Commercial Awards	2020	"TKN" (with Travis Scott)	Craft: Direction	Nominated	
Berlin Commercial Awards	2022	Motomami (song)	Craft: Editing	Nominated	
Berlin Commercial Awards	2022	Rosalía/Spotify	Craft: Editing	Nominated	
Berlin Commercial Awards	2023	Rosalía/Spotify	Craft: Editing	Nominated	
Berlin Commercial Awards	2023	"Despechá"	Best Music Video	Nominated	
Berlin Commercial Awards	2023	"Despechá"	Craft: Editing	Nominated	
Berlin Commercial Awards	2023	Motomami (song)	Craft: Editing	Nominated	
Berlin Commercial Awards	2023	Motomami (song)	Best Music Video	Nominated	
Berlin Commercial Awards	2023	"Vampiros" (with Rauw Alejandro)	Best Music Video	Nominated	
Berlin Commercial Awards	2023	"Beso" (with Rauw Alejandro)	Best Music Video	Nominated	
Berlin Commercial Awards	2023	"Beso" (with Rauw Alejandro)	Craft: Idea	Nominated	
Berlin Commercial Awards	2023	"Beso" (with Rauw Alejandro)	Craft: Editing	Nominated	
Berlin Commercial Awards	2023	Cupra x Rosalía - ABCDEFG	Commercials and Branded Content - Short	Nominated	
Berlin Commercial Awards	2023	Cupra x Rosalía - ABCDEFG	Craft: Direction	Nominated	
Berlin Commercial Awards	2023	Cupra x Rosalía - ABCDEFG	Craft: VFX/Animation	Nominated	
Berlin Commercial Awards	2023	Cupra x Rosalía - ABCDEFG	Craft: Editing	Won	
Berlin Commercial Awards	2023	Rosalía Coke Creations	Craft: Editing	Nominated	
Berlin Commercial Awards	2023	Rosalía Coke Creations	Commercials and Branded Content - Short	Nominated	
Berlin Commercial Awards	2026	"Berghain" (with Björk and Yves Tumor)	Best Music Video	Won	
Berlin Commercial Awards	2026	"Berghain" (with Björk and Yves Tumor)	Craft: Costume Styling	Nominated	
Berlin Commercial Awards	2026	"Berghain" (with Björk and Yves Tumor)	Craft: Direction	Won	
Berlin Commercial Awards	2026	"Berghain" (with Björk and Yves Tumor)	Craft: Idea	Nominated	
Berlin Commercial Awards	2026	"Berghain" (with Björk and Yves Tumor)	Craft: VFX/Animation	Won	
Berlin Commercial Awards	2026	Focu 'Ranni	Craft: Editing	Nominated	
Berlin Music Video Awards	2019	"De aquí no sales"	Best Art Director	Nominated	
Berlin Music Video Awards	2021	"TKN" (with Travis Scott)	Best Director	Nominated	
Berlin Music Video Awards	2022	"Saoko"	Best Editor	Nominated	
Berlin Music Video Awards	2025	"New Woman" (with Lisa)	Best Editor	Nominated	
Berlin Music Video Awards	2026	"Berghain" (with Björk and Yves Tumor)	Best Director	3rd place	
BIC Seven Awards	2024	Herself	Spanish Artist Of The Year	Won	
Billboard Latin Music Awards	2019	Herself	Female Top Latin Albums Artist of the Year	Nominated	
Billboard Latin Music Awards	2019	El Mal Querer	Latin Pop Album of the Year	Nominated	
Billboard Latin Music Awards	2020	"Con Altura" (with J Balvin featuring El Guincho)	Latin Pop Song of the Year	Nominated	
Billboard Latin Music Awards	2020	"Yo x Ti, Tu x Mi" (with Ozuna)	Latin Pop Song of the Year	Nominated	
Billboard Latin Music Awards	2021	"La Noche de Anoche" (with Bad Bunny)	Vocal Event Hot Latin Song of the Year	Nominated	
Billboard Latin Music Awards	2021	Herself	Female Hot Latin Songs Artist of the Year	Nominated	
Billboard Latin Music Awards	2022	Herself	Female Hot Latin Songs Artist of the Year	Nominated	
Billboard Latin Music Awards	2022	Herself	Female Top Latin Albums Artist of the Year	Nominated	
Billboard Latin Music Awards	2022	Motomami	Latin Pop Album of the Year	Won	
Billboard Latin Music Awards	2023	Herself	Hot Latin Songs Artist of the Year, Female	Nominated	
Billboard Latin Music Awards	2023	Herself	Top Latin Albums Artist of the Year, Female	Nominated	
Billboard Latin Music Awards	2023	Herself	Latin Pop Artist of the Year	Nominated	
Billboard Latin Music Awards	2023	"Beso" (with Rauw Alejandro)	Latin Pop Song of the Year	Nominated	
Billboard Latin Music Awards	2023	"Despechá"	Tropical Song of the Year	Nominated	
Billboard Latin Music Awards	2023	"El Pañuelo" (with Romeo Santos)	Tropical Song of the Year	Nominated	
Billboard Latin Music Awards	2026	Herself	Hall of Fame	Honoree	
Billboard Latin Music Awards	2026	Herself	Hot Latin Songs Artist of the Year, Female	Nominated	
Billboard Latin Music Awards	2026	Herself	Top Latin Albums Artist of the Year, Female	Nominated	
Billboard Latin Music Awards	2026	Herself	Latin Pop Artist of the Year, Solo	Won	
Billboard Latin Music Awards	2026	"La Perla" (with Yahritza y su Esencia)	Global 200 Latin Song of the Year	Nominated	
Billboard Latin Music Awards	2026	Lux	Top Latin Album of the Year	Nominated	
Billboard Latin Music Awards	2026	Lux	Top Latin Pop Album of the Year	Won	
Billboard Latin Women in Music	2026	Herself	Woman of the Year	Honoree	
Billboard Music Awards	2021	Herself	Top Latin Female Artist	Nominated	
Billboard Music Awards	2022	Herself	Top Latin Female Artist	Nominated	
Billboard Music Awards	2023	Herself	Top Latin Female Artist	Nominated	
Billboard Women in Music	2019	Herself	Rising Star Award	Honoree	
Billboard Women in Music	2023	Herself	Producer of the Year	Honoree	
BMI Latin Awards	2021	"Con Altura" (with J Balvin featuring El Guincho)	Most Performed Songs of the Year	Won	
BMI Latin Awards	2021	"Yo x Ti, Tu x Mi" (with Ozuna)	Most Performed Songs of the Year	Won	
BMI Latin Awards	2022	"La Noche de Anoche" (with Bad Bunny)	Most Performed Songs of the Year	Won	
BMI Latin Awards	2022	"Relación (Remix)" (with Sech, Daddy Yankee, J Balvin, & Farruko)	Most Performed Songs of the Year	Won	
BMI Latin Awards	2024	"Despechá"	Most Performed Songs of the Year	Won	
BMI Latin Awards	2025	"Beso" (with Rauw Alejandro)	Most Performed Songs of the Year	Won	
BMI London Awards	2021	"Yo x Ti, Tu x Mi" (with Ozuna)	Most Performed Songs of the Year	Won	
BMI London Awards	2022	"La Noche de Anoche" (with Bad Bunny)	Most Performed Songs of the Year	Won	
BMI London Awards	2022	"Relación (Remix)" (with Sech, Daddy Yankee, J Balvin, & Farruko)	Most Performed Songs of the Year	Won	
BMI London Awards	2023	"Despechá"	Most Performed Songs of the Year	Won	
BMI London Awards	2024	"Beso" (with Rauw Alejandro)	Most Performed Songs of the Year	Won	
BreakTudo Awards	2019	Herself	Rising Star Artist	Nominated	
BreakTudo Awards	2019	"Con Altura" (with J Balvin featuring El Guincho)	Boom Clip of the Year	Nominated	
BreakTudo Awards	2019	"Con Altura" (with J Balvin featuring El Guincho)	International Hit	Nominated	
BreakTudo Awards	2020	"Yo x Ti, Tu x Mi" (with Ozuna)	Collaboration of the Year	Nominated	
BreakTudo Awards	2021	"La Noche de Anoche" (with Bad Bunny)	Collaboration International	Nominated	
BreakTudo Awards	2022	Herself	Global Artist	Nominated	
BreakTudo Awards	2022	"Despechá"	Latin Hit	Nominated	
BreakTudo Awards	2023	"Beso" (with Rauw Alejandro)	Collaboration International	Nominated	
BreakTudo Awards	2024	"New Woman" (with Lisa)	Collaboration International of the Year	Won	
BreakTudo Awards	2026	Herself	Global Artist	Nominated	
BreakTudo Awards	2026	"La Perla" (with Yahritza y su Esencia)	Latin Hit of the Year	Nominated	
Brit Awards	2026	Herself	International Artist of the Year	Won	
Camerimage International Film Festival	2026	"Berghain" (with Björk and Yves Tumor)	Best Music Video	Nominated	
Cannes Lions International Festival of Creativity	2023	"Motomami (Rosalía TikTok Live Performance)"	Partnerships with Music Talent	Bronze Lion	
Cannes Lions International Festival of Creativity	2023	"Motomami (Rosalía TikTok Live Performance)"	Excellence in Music Video	Silver Lion	
Cannes Lions International Festival of Creativity	2023	"Motomami (Rosalía TikTok Live Performance)"	Fan Engagement/Community Building	Gold Lion	
Cannes Lions International Festival of Creativity	2023	Spotify Presents: FC Barcelona x Motomami	Fan Engagement/Community Building	Bronze Lion	
Cannes Lions International Festival of Creativity	2023	Spotify Presents: FC Barcelona x Motomami	Brand Partnerships, Sponsorships & Collaborations	Shortlisted	
Cannes Lions International Festival of Creativity	2026	"Berghain" (with Björk and Yves Tumor)	Excellence in Music Video	Grand Prix	
Ciclope Awards	2018	"Malamente"	Music Video - Editing	Shortlisted	
Ciclope Awards	2022	Motomami (song)	Music Video - Editing	Shortlisted	
Ciclope Awards	2023	Cupra x Rosalía - ABCDEFG	Post-Production - Color Grading	Shortlisted	
Ciclope Awards	2026	"Berghain" (with Björk and Yves Tumor)	Music Video - Direction	Silver	
Ciclope Awards	2026	"Berghain" (with Björk and Yves Tumor)	Music Video - Cinematography	Bronze	
Ciclope Awards	2026	"Berghain" (with Björk and Yves Tumor)	Music Video - Editing	Gold	
Clio Awards	2020	La Rosalía: The Sound of Energy, Freedom and Love	Editing (Film Craft)	Silver	
Clio Awards	2026	"Berghain" (with Björk and Yves Tumor)	Music (Branded Entertainment & Content)	Silver	
Clio Awards	2026	"Berghain" (with Björk and Yves Tumor)	Direction	Bronze	
Clio Awards	2026	"Berghain" (with Björk and Yves Tumor)	Production Design	Shortlisted	
Clio Music Awards	2020	La Rosalía: The Sound of Energy, Freedom and Love	Editing (Film / Video Craft)	Silver	
Clio Music Awards	2024	Spotify Presents: FC Barcelona x Motomami	Partnerships & Collaborations	Gold	
Clio Music Awards	2024	Spotify Presents: FC Barcelona x Motomami	Experience/Activation	Silver	
Clio Music Awards	2024	Spotify Presents: FC Barcelona x Motomami	Partnerships (Fan Engagement)	Silver	
Clio Music Awards	2024	Spotify Presents: FC Barcelona x Motomami	Brand and Artist Collaborations (Public Relations)	Silver	
Clio Music Awards	2024	Spotify Presents: FC Barcelona x Motomami	Multi-Platform (Social Media)	Shortlisted	
Clio Music Awards	2024	Spotify/Rosalía	31 Seconds to 60 Seconds (Film & Video)	Silver	
Clio Music Awards	2024	Motomami (song)	Editing (Film & Video Craft)	Silver	
Clio Music Awards	2024	Motomami (song)	Music Videos (Film & Video)	Bronze	
Clio Music Awards	2024	"Motomami (Rosalía TikTok Live Performance)"	Social Video	Silver	
Clio Music Awards	2024	"Motomami (Rosalía TikTok Live Performance)"	Film (Fan Engagement)	Bronze	
Clio Music Awards	2024	"Motomami (Rosalía TikTok Live Performance)"	Social Media (Fan Engagement)	Bronze	
Clio Music Awards	2024	"Motomami (Rosalía TikTok Live Performance)"	Single Platform (Social Media)	Bronze	
Clio Music Awards	2024	Coke Move	Branded Entertainment & Content	Bronze	
Clio Music Awards	2024	"Beso" (with Rauw Alejandro)	Music Videos (Film & Video)	Bronze	
Clio Music Awards	2024	"Beso" (with Rauw Alejandro)	Editing (Film & Video Craft)	Bronze	
Clio Music Awards	2024	"Despechá"	Editing (Film & Video Craft)	Bronze	
Creative Circle Awards	2023	"El Pañuelo" (with Romeo Santos)	Music Video - Colour Grading (single)	Silver	
Creative Circle Awards	2025	"New Woman" (with Lisa)	Music Video - Editing (single)	Gold	
Creative Circle Awards	2026	"Berghain" (with Björk and Yves Tumor)	Music Video - Promo Film (single)	Gold	
Creative Circle Awards	2026	"Berghain" (with Björk and Yves Tumor)	Music Video - Direction (single)	Gold	
Creative Circle Awards	2026	"Berghain" (with Björk and Yves Tumor)	Music Video - Editing (single)	Silver	
D&AD Awards	2019	"Malamente"	Direction for Music Videos	Wood Pencil	
D&AD Awards	2019	"Malamente"	Music Video	Wood Pencil	
D&AD Awards	2019	"De Aquí No Sales"	Music Video	Shortlisted	
D&AD Awards	2019	"De Aquí No Sales"	Editing for Music Videos	Shortlisted	
D&AD Awards	2019	"De Aquí No Sales"	Production Design for Music Videos	Shortlisted	
D&AD Awards	2021	"TKN" (with Travis Scott)	Direction for Music Videos	Graphite Pencil	
D&AD Awards	2022	"Saoko"	Direction for Music Videos	Shortlisted	
D&AD Awards	2022	"Saoko"	Performance for Music Videos	Shortlisted	
D&AD Awards	2023	"Motomami (Rosalía TikTok Live Performance)"	Albums for Music Videos	Wood Pencil	
D&AD Awards	2026	"Berghain" (with Björk and Yves Tumor)	Direction for Music Videos	Yellow Pencil	
D&AD Awards	2026	"Berghain" (with Björk and Yves Tumor)	Concept for Music Videos	Yellow Pencil	
D&AD Awards	2026	"Berghain" (with Björk and Yves Tumor)	Art Direction for Music Videos	Yellow Pencil	
D&AD Awards	2026	"Berghain" (with Björk and Yves Tumor)	Cinematography for Music Videos	Wood Pencil	
Escuela Superior de Artes Escénicas de Málaga	2019	Herself	"Antonio Banderas" Performing Arts Award	Honoree	
Eyecandy Awards	2026	"Berghain" (with Björk and Yves Tumor)	Music Videos of the Year	Won	
Glamour Awards	2017	Herself	Artist of the Year	Won	
Grammy Awards	2020	Herself	Best New Artist	Nominated	
Grammy Awards	2020	El Mal Querer	Best Latin Rock, Urban or Alternative Album	Won	
Grammy Awards	2023	Motomami	Best Latin Rock or Alternative Album	Won	
Grammy Awards	2023	"Motomami (Rosalía TikTok Live Performance)"	Best Music Film	Nominated	
Grammy Awards	2027	"Berghain" (with Björk and Yves Tumor)	Record of the Year	Pending	
Grammy Awards	2027	"Berghain" (with Björk and Yves Tumor)	Song of the Year	Pending	
Grammy Awards	2027	"Berghain" (with Björk and Yves Tumor)	Best Music Video	Pending	
Grammy Awards	2027	Lux (Complete Works)	Album of the Year	Pending	
Grammy Awards	2027	Lux (Complete Works)	Best Alternative Music Album	Pending	
Grammy Awards	2027	"Sauvignon Blanc"	Best Pop Solo Performance	Pending	
Grammy Awards	2027	"Reliquia"	Best Alternative Music Performance	Pending	
Grammy Awards	2027	"La Perla" (with Yahritza y su Esencia)	Best Latin Song	Pending	
Grammy Awards	2027	"Porcelana" (with Dougie F)	Best Global Music Performance	Pending	
Heat Latin Music Awards	2020	"Con Altura" (with J Balvin featuring El Guincho)	Best Collaboration	Won	
Heat Latin Music Awards	2020	Herself	Best Female Artist	Nominated	
Heat Latin Music Awards	2021	Herself	Best Female Artist	Nominated	
Heat Latin Music Awards	2021	"La Noche de Anoche" (with Bad Bunny)	Best Music Video	Nominated	
Heat Latin Music Awards	2022	"La Fama" (with The Weeknd)	Best Music Video	Nominated	
Heat Latin Music Awards	2022	"Saoko"	Best Music Video	Nominated	
Heat Latin Music Awards	2022	Herself	Best Female Artist	Nominated	
Heat Latin Music Awards	2023	Herself	Best Female Artist	Nominated	
Heat Latin Music Awards	2023	"Despechá"	Song of the Year	Nominated	
Heat Latin Music Awards	2026	"La Perla" (with Yahritza y su Esencia)	Song of the Year	Nominated	
Heat Latin Music Awards	2026	"La Perla" (with Yahritza y su Esencia)	Best Viral Song	Nominated	
Heat Latin Music Awards	2026	Herself	Best Female Artist	Nominated	
Heat Latin Music Awards	2026	Herself	Best Pop Artist	Nominated	
Heat Latin Music Awards	2026	"Berghain" (with Björk and Yves Tumor)	Best Music Video	Nominated	
Heat Latin Music Awards	2026	Lux	Album of the Year	Nominated	
Hollywood Music Video Awards	2025	"New Woman" (with Lisa)	Music Video of the Year	Nominated	
Hollywood Music Video Awards	2025	"New Woman" (with Lisa)	Best Styling	Won	
Hollywood Music Video Awards	2025	"New Woman" (with Lisa)	Best Hair and Makeup	Nominated	
Hollywood Music Video Awards	2025	"New Woman" (with Lisa)	Best Dance & Electronic	Nominated	
Hollywood Music Video Awards	2025	"New Woman" (with Lisa)	Best International	Won	
Hollywood Music Video Awards	2026	"Berghain" (with Björk and Yves Tumor)	Music Video of the Year	Won	
Hollywood Music Video Awards	2026	"Berghain" (with Björk and Yves Tumor)	Best Direction	Won	
Hollywood Music Video Awards	2026	"Berghain" (with Björk and Yves Tumor)	Best Concept	Nominated	
Icelandic Music Awards	2024	"Oral" (featuring Björk)	Best of Pop, Rock, Hip-Hop & Electronic - Composition of the Year	Nominated	
iHeartRadio Music Awards	2020	"Con Altura" (with J Balvin featuring El Guincho)	Best Music Video	Nominated	
iHeartRadio Music Awards	2020	Herself	Best New Pop/Urban Latin Artist	Won	
iHeartRadio Music Awards	2023	Herself	Favorite Tour Style	Nominated	
Imagen Awards	2026	Euphoria	Best Supporting Actress – Drama (Television)	Nominated	
Ivor Novello Awards	2026	Herself	International Songwriter of the Year	Honoree	
Kids' Choice Awards	2020	Herself	Favorite Global Music Star	Nominated	
Kids' Choice Awards	2022	Herself	Favorite Global Music Star	Nominated	
Kids' Choice Awards	2023	Herself	Favorite Global Music Star	Nominated	
Kids' Choice Awards México	2023	Herself	Favorite Global Artist	Nominated	
Korea Grand Music Awards	2025	"New Woman" (with Lisa)	Best Music Video	Nominated	
Las Culturistas Culture Awards	2023	"Rosalía — Coachella"	Rosalía Award for Best Outdoor Live Performance	Won	
Latin American Music Awards	2019	Herself	Best New Artist	Nominated	
Latin American Music Awards	2019	Herself	Favorite Female Artist	Nominated	
Latin American Music Awards	2019	El Mal Querer	Favorite Pop Album	Nominated	
Latin American Music Awards	2021	"TKN" (with Travis Scott)	Favorite Video	Nominated	
Latin American Music Awards	2022	Herself	Favorite Female Artist	Nominated	
Latin American Music Awards	2023	Herself	Artist of the Year	Nominated	
Latin American Music Awards	2023	Herself	Favorite Pop Artist	Nominated	
Latin American Music Awards	2023	"Despechá"	Song of the Year	Nominated	
Latin American Music Awards	2023	"Despechá"	Favorite Tropical Song	Nominated	
Latin American Music Awards	2023	"La Fama" (with The Weeknd)	Collaboration Crossover of the Year	Won	
Latin American Music Awards	2023	"El Pañuelo" (with Romeo Santos)	Best Collaboration - Tropical	Nominated	
Latin American Music Awards	2023	Motomami	Album of the Year	Nominated	
Latin American Music Awards	2023	Motomami	Favorite Pop Album	Won	
Latin American Music Awards	2024	"Beso" (with Rauw Alejandro)	Favorite Pop Song	Nominated	
Latin Grammy Awards	2017	Herself	Best New Artist	Nominated	
Latin Grammy Awards	2018	"Malamente"	Record of the Year	Nominated	
Latin Grammy Awards	2018	"Malamente"	Song of the Year	Nominated	
Latin Grammy Awards	2018	"Malamente"	Best Alternative Song	Won	
Latin Grammy Awards	2018	"Malamente"	Best Urban Fusion/Performance	Won	
Latin Grammy Awards	2018	"Malamente"	Best Short Form Music Video	Nominated	
Latin Grammy Awards	2019 (Note: At the 20th Annual Latin Grammy Awards, El Mal Querer also won Best Recording Package and Best Engineered Album, the former award went to Man Mourentan and Tamara Pérez, the art directors of the album while the latter went to El Guincho and Brian Hernández, Jaycen Joshua and Chris Athens.)	El Mal Querer	Album of the Year	Won	
Latin Grammy Awards	2019	El Mal Querer	Best Contemporary Pop Vocal Album	Won	
Latin Grammy Awards	2019	"Aute Cuture"	Record of the Year	Nominated	
Latin Grammy Awards	2019	"Pienso en tu Mirá"	Best Pop Song	Nominated	
Latin Grammy Awards	2019	"Con Altura" (with J Balvin featuring El Guincho)	Best Urban Song	Won	
Latin Grammy Awards	2020	"Yo x Ti, Tu x Mi" (with Ozuna)	Best Urban Song	Won	
Latin Grammy Awards	2020	"Yo x Ti, Tu x Mi" (with Ozuna)	Best Urban Fusion/Performance	Won	
Latin Grammy Awards	2020	"Dolerme"	Best Pop/Rock Song	Nominated	
Latin Grammy Awards	2020	"TKN" (with Travis Scott)	Best Short Form Music Video	Won	
Latin Grammy Awards	2022 (Note: At the 23rd Annual Latin Grammy Awards, Motomami also won for Best Engineered Album, the award goes to Chris Gehringer, Jeremie Inhaber, Manny Marroquin, Zach Peraya & Anthony Vilchis.)	Motomami	Album of the Year	Won	
Latin Grammy Awards	2022	Motomami	Best Alternative Music Album	Won	
Latin Grammy Awards	2022	Motomami	Best Recording Package	Won	
Latin Grammy Awards	2022	"Hentai"	Song of the Year	Nominated	
Latin Grammy Awards	2022	"Hentai"	Best Alternative Song	Nominated	
Latin Grammy Awards	2022	"Hentai"	Best Short Form Music Video	Nominated	
Latin Grammy Awards	2022	"La Fama" (with The Weeknd)	Record of the Year	Nominated	
Latin Grammy Awards	2022	"Motomami (Rosalía TikTok Live Performance)"	Best Long Form Music Video	Nominated	
Latin Grammy Awards	2023	"Despechá"	Record of the Year	Nominated	
Latin Grammy Awards	2026 (Note: At the 27th Annual Latin Grammy Awards, Lux also won for Best Engineered Album, the award went to engineers Daniel Cayotte, Isaac Diskin, Tristan Hoogland, Jake Miller, David Rodríguez & Harry Wilson; mixer Manny Marroquin; and mastering engineers Bob Jackson & Brian Lee.)	"La Perla" (with Yahritza y su Esencia)	Record of the Year	Nominated	
Latin Grammy Awards	2026	"La Perla" (with Yahritza y su Esencia)	Song of the Year	Won	
Latin Grammy Awards	2026	"La Perla" (with Yahritza y su Esencia)	Best Pop Song	Won	
Latin Grammy Awards	2026	Lux (Complete Works)	Album of the Year	Won	
Latin Grammy Awards	2026	Lux (Complete Works)	Best Alternative Music Album	Won	
Latin Grammy Awards	2026	"Memória" (with Carminho)	Best Portuguese Language Song	Nominated	
Latin Grammy Awards	2026	Sauvignon Blanc	Best Short Form Music Video	Won	
Latin Music Italian Awards	2021	"TKN" (with Travis Scott)	Best Latin Song	Nominated	
Latin Music Italian Awards	2021	"TKN" (with Travis Scott)	Best Spanglish Song	Nominated	
Latin Music Italian Awards	2021	"TKN" (with Travis Scott)	Best Latin Collaboration	Nominated	
Latin Music Italian Awards	2021	"TKN" (with Travis Scott)	Best Latin Female Video	Won	
Latin Music Italian Awards	2021	"TKN" (with Travis Scott)	Best Latin Video Choreography	Won	
Latin Music Italian Awards	2021	"Relación (Remix)" (with Sech, Daddy Yankee, J Balvin, & Farruko)	Best Latin Remix	Won	
Latin Music Italian Awards	2021	Herself	Best Latin Female Artist	Nominated	
Los 40 Music Awards	2019	Herself	Best Spanish Artist	Won	
Los 40 Music Awards	2019	El Mal Querer	Best Spanish Album	Nominated	
Los 40 Music Awards	2019	"Con Altura" (with J Balvin featuring El Guincho)	Best Spanish Video	Nominated	
Los 40 Music Awards	2019	"Con Altura" (with J Balvin featuring El Guincho)	Los40 Global Show Award	Won	
Los 40 Music Awards	2020	"TKN" (with Travis Scott)	Best Latin Music Video	Nominated	
Los 40 Music Awards	2021	"La Noche de Anoche" (with Bad Bunny)	Best Latin Music Video	Nominated	
Los 40 Music Awards	2022	Herself	Golden Music Award	Honoree	
Los 40 Music Awards	2022	Herself	Best Spanish Artist	Nominated	
Los 40 Music Awards	2022	Herself	Best Spanish Live Act	Nominated	
Los 40 Music Awards	2022	Motomami	Best Spanish Album	Won	
Los 40 Music Awards	2022	"Saoko"	Best Spanish Music Video	Nominated	
Los 40 Music Awards	2022	"La Fama" (with The Weeknd)	Best Spanish Song	Nominated	
Los 40 Music Awards	2022	"La Fama" (with The Weeknd)	Best Spanish Collaboration	Nominated	
Los 40 Music Awards	2022	Motomami World Tour	Best Spanish Festival, Tour or Concert	Won	
Los 40 Music Awards	2023	"Beso" (with Rauw Alejandro)	Best Spanish Song	Nominated	
Los 40 Music Awards	2025	Herself	Global Icon Award	Honoree	
Los 40 Music Awards	2026	Herself	Global Artist of the Year	Honoree	
Los 40 Music Awards	2026	Herself	Best Spanish Artist	Nominated	
Los 40 Music Awards	2026	Herself	Best Spanish Live Act	Nominated	
Los 40 Music Awards	2026	Lux	Best Spanish Album	Won	
Los 40 Music Awards	2026	"La Perla" (with Yahritza y su Esencia)	Best Spanish Song	Nominated	
Los 40 Music Awards	2026	"Berghain" (with Björk and Yves Tumor)	Best Spanish Music Video	Won	
Los 40 Music Awards	2026	Lux Tour	Best Spanish Tour or Concert	Nominated	
Los 40 Music Awards	2026	Lux Tour	Best International Tour	Won	
Medallas del FAD	2024	Herself	Honorary Medal	Honoree	
Ministry of Culture (Spain)	2026	Herself	National Award for Contemporary Music	Honoree	
MTV Europe Music Awards	2018	Herself	Best Spanish Act	Nominated	
MTV Europe Music Awards	2019	"Con Altura" (with J Balvin featuring El Guincho)	Best Video	Nominated	
MTV Europe Music Awards	2019	"Con Altura" (with J Balvin featuring El Guincho)	Best Collaboration	Won	
MTV Europe Music Awards	2019	Herself	Best Push Act	Nominated	
MTV Europe Music Awards	2019	Herself	Best Look	Nominated	
MTV Europe Music Awards	2021	Herself	Best Latin	Nominated	
MTV Europe Music Awards	2022	Herself	Best Latin	Nominated	
MTV Europe Music Awards	2022	Herself	Best Artist	Nominated	
MTV Europe Music Awards	2022	Herself	Best Spanish Act	Nominated	
MTV Europe Music Awards	2022	"Despechá"	Best Song	Nominated	
MTV Europe Music Awards	2022	"Motomami (Rosalía TikTok Live Performance)"	Best Longform Video	Nominated	
MTV Europe Music Awards	2023	Herself	Best Latin	Nominated	
MTV Europe Music Awards	2024	"New Woman" (with Lisa)	Best Video	Nominated	
MTV Europe Music Awards	2024	"New Woman" (with Lisa)	Best Collaboration	Won	
MTV Millennial Awards	2019	Herself	MIAW Artist	Nominated	
MTV Millennial Awards	2019	Herself	Best Female Artist	Nominated	
MTV Millennial Awards	2019	"Con Altura" (with J Balvin featuring El Guincho)	Ship of the Year (Best Collaboration)	Nominated	
MTV Millennial Awards	2019	"Con Altura" (with J Balvin featuring El Guincho)	Video of the Year	Nominated	
MTV Millennial Awards	2021	"La Noche de Anoche" (with Bad Bunny)	Video of the Year	Won	
MTV Millennial Awards	2021	"La Noche de Anoche" (with Bad Bunny)	Ship of the Year (Best Collaboration)	Nominated	
MTV Millennial Awards	2021	"Lo Vas a Olvidar" (with Billie Eilish)	Ship of the Year (Best Collaboration)	Nominated	
MTV Millennial Awards	2021	"Relación (Remix)" (with Sech, Daddy Yankee, J Balvin, & Farruko)	Hit of the Year (Best Song)	Nominated	
MTV Millennial Awards	2022	"Linda" (with Tokischa)	Video of the Year	Nominated	
MTV Millennial Awards	2022	"Saoko"	Video of the Year	Nominated	
MTV Millennial Awards	2022	"Saoko"	Hit of the Year (Best Song)	Nominated	
MTV Millennial Awards	2022	"Abcdefg"	Miawdio of the Year	Nominated	
MTV Millennial Awards	2022	"La Fama" (with The Weeknd)	Ship of the Year (Best Collaboration)	Nominated	
MTV Millennial Awards	2022	Herself	MIAW Artist	Nominated	
MTV Millennial Awards	2022	Herself	Motomami of the Year	Nominated	
MTV Millennial Awards	2022	Rosalía and Rauw Alejandro	Couple of the Year	Nominated	
MTV Millennial Awards	2023	Herself	MIAW Artist	Nominated	
MTV Millennial Awards	2023	"Beso" (with Rauw Alejandro)	Global Hit of the Year	Nominated	
MTV Millennial Awards	2023	"Beso" (with Rauw Alejandro)	Music Ship of the Year (Best Collaboration)	Nominated	
MTV Millennial Awards	2023	"Vampiros" (with Rauw Alejandro)	Video of the Year	Nominated	
MTV Millennial Awards	2023	Ángeles	Fandom	Nominated	
MTV Millennial Awards	2023	Rosalía and Rauw Alejandro	Couple Goals	Nominated	
MTV Millennial Awards Brazil	2022	Herself	¡Me Gusta!	Nominated	
MTV Video Music Awards	2019	"Con Altura" (with J Balvin featuring El Guincho)	Best Choreography	Won	
MTV Video Music Awards	2019	"Con Altura" (with J Balvin featuring El Guincho)	Best Latin	Won	
MTV Video Music Awards	2019	"Con Altura" (with J Balvin featuring El Guincho)	Song of the Summer	Nominated	
MTV Video Music Awards	2019	Herself	Best New Artist	Nominated	
MTV Video Music Awards	2020	"A Palé"	Best Editing	Nominated	
MTV Video Music Awards	2021	"Lo Vas a Olvidar" (with Billie Eilish)	Best Latin	Won	
MTV Video Music Awards	2022	"La Fama" (with The Weeknd)	Best Collaboration	Nominated	
MTV Video Music Awards	2022	"Saoko"	Best Editing	Won	
MTV Video Music Awards	2022	"Bizcochito"	Song of the Summer	Nominated	
MTV Video Music Awards	2023	"Despechá"	Best Latin	Nominated	
MTV Video Music Awards	2026	"La Perla" (with Yahritza y su Esencia)	Best Latin	Nominated	
Musa Awards	2022	Herself	Latin International Artist of the Year	Nominated	
Musa Awards	2022	"Despechá"	Latin International Song of the Year	Nominated	
Musa Awards	2023	"Beso" (with Rauw Alejandro)	Latin International Song of the Year	Nominated	
Musa Awards	2023	"Beso" (with Rauw Alejandro)	International Collaboration of the Year	Nominated	
Music Awards Japan	2026	"Reliquia"	Best International Alternative Song in Japan	Won	
Music Moves Europe Talent Awards	2019	Herself	RnB/Urban	Won	
M-V-F- Awards	2019	"Aute Cuture"	Best International Music Video - Public's Choice	Nominated	
M-V-F- Awards	2019	"De aquí no sales"	Best Direction in an International Music Video - Jury's Choice	Nominated	
M-V-F- Awards	2022	"Motomami (Rosalía TikTok Live Performance)"	Innovation in an International Video - Jury's Choice	Nominated	
M-V-F- Awards	2023	"Vampiros" (with Rauw Alejandro)	International Music Video - Jury's Choice	Nominated	
M-V-F- Awards	2023	"Vampiros" (with Rauw Alejandro)	International Music Video - Public's Choice	Nominated	
M-V-F- Awards	2025	"Berghain" (with Björk and Yves Tumor)	Best International Music Video - Jury's Choice	Won	
M-V-F- Awards	2025	"Berghain" (with Björk and Yves Tumor)	Best International Music Video - Public's Choice	Nominated	
M-V-F- Awards	2025	"Berghain" (with Björk and Yves Tumor)	Best Direction - Jury's Choice	Nominated	
MVPA Awards	2020	"A Palé"	Best Pop Video	Nominated	
MVPA Awards	2020	"TKN" (with Travis Scott)	Best Pop Video	Won	
MVPA Awards	2020	"TKN" (with Travis Scott)	Best Choreography	Won	
MVPA Awards	2020	La Rosalía: The Sound of Energy, Freedom and Love	Best Visual Project	Nominated	
NRJ Music Awards	2022	Herself	International Revelation of the Year	Nominated	
NRJ Music Awards	2022	"La Fama" (with The Weeknd)	Best International Collaboration	Nominated	
NRJ Music Awards	2023	"Beso" (with Rauw Alejandro)	Best International Collaboration	Won	
NRJ Music Awards	2023	Herself	International Female Artist of the Year	Nominated	
People's Choice Awards	2022	Herself	The Latin Artist of 2022	Nominated	
People's Choice Awards	2024	Herself	The Female Latin Artist of the Year	Nominated	
Pollstar Awards	2023	Motomami World Tour	Latin Tour of the Year	Nominated	
Pollstar Awards	2023	Herself	New Headliner of the Year	Nominated	
Premios APCP	2026	"Malamente"	Best Production of the Last 20 Years	Won	
Premios de la Academia de Música	2026	Herself	Artist of the Year	Won	
Premios de la Academia de Música	2026	Lux	Album of the Year	Won	
Premios de la Academia de Música	2026	Lux	Producer of the Year	Won	
Premios de la Academia de Música	2026	Lux	Best Pop Album	Won	
Premios de la Academia de Música	2026	"La Perla" (with Yahritza y su Esencia)	Song of the Year	Won	
Premios de la Academia de Música	2026	"La Perla" (with Yahritza y su Esencia)	Songwriter of the Year	Won	
Premios de la Academia de Música	2026	"La Perla" (with Yahritza y su Esencia)	Best Pop Song	Won	
Premios de la Academia de Música	2026	"Berghain" (with Björk and Yves Tumor)	Best Music Video	Won	
Premios El Ojo Crítico	2017	Herself	Modern Music	Honoree	
Premios Juventud	2019	"Con Altura" (with J Balvin featuring El Guincho)	Best Choreography - Sick Dance Routine	Nominated	
Premios Juventud	2019	Herself	New to the US, but big at home	Won	
Premios Juventud	2020	Herself	Nailed It	Nominated	
Premios Juventud	2020	Herself	Sneakerhead	Nominated	
Premios Juventud	2020	Herself and Kylie Jenner	Together They Fire Up My Feed	Nominated	
Premios Juventud	2021	Herself	Best Female Artist	Nominated	
Premios Juventud	2021	"TKN" (with Travis Scott)	OMG Collaboration	Nominated	
Premios Juventud	2021	"Lo Vas a Olvidar" (with Billie Eilish)	Girl Power	Nominated	
Premios Juventud	2021	"Relación (Remix)" (with Sech, Daddy Yankee, J Balvin, & Farruko)	The Best Mix	Won	
Premios Juventud	2021	"Relación (Remix)" (with Sech, Daddy Yankee, J Balvin, & Farruko)	Viral Track of the Year	Nominated	
Premios Juventud	2021	"Relación (Remix)" (with Sech, Daddy Yankee, J Balvin, & Farruko)	Best Traffic Jam	Nominated	
Premios Juventud	2022	Herself	Best Female Artist	Nominated	
Premios Juventud	2022	Motomami	Album of the Year	Nominated	
Premios Juventud	2022	"Linda" (with Tokischa)	Girl Power	Nominated	
Premios Juventud	2022	"Linda" (with Tokischa)	Best Social Dance Challenge	Nominated	
Premios Juventud	2022	"La Fama" (with The Weeknd)	Collaboration OMG	Nominated	
Premios Juventud	2022	"Chicken Teriyaki"	The Hottest Choreography	Nominated	
Premios Juventud	2023	Herself	Artist of the Youth – Female	Nominated	
Premios Juventud	2023	"Beso" (with Rauw Alejandro)	Best Song By a Couple	Won	
Premios Juventud	2023	"Despechá RMX" (with Cardi B)	OMG Collaboration	Won	
Premios Juventud	2023	"Despechá RMX" (with Cardi B)	Girl Power	Nominated	
Premios Juventud	2023	"Besos Moja2" (with Wisin & Yandel)	Best Urban Mix	Nominated	
Premios Juventud	2023	"Despechá"	Best Pop/Urban Song	Nominated	
Premios Juventud	2023	"El Pañuelo" (with Romeo Santos)	Best Tropical Mix	Nominated	
Premios Juventud	2023	Motomami +	Best Pop/Urban Album	Won	
Premios Juventud	2023	Rosalía & Rauw Alejandro	Couples That Blow Up My Social	Won	
Premios Juventud	2026	Herself	Artist of the Youth – Female	Nominated	
Premios Juventud	2026	"La Perla" (with Yahritza y su Esencia)	My Favorite Track	Nominated	
Premios Juventud	2026	Lux	Album of the Year	Nominated	
Premios Juventud	2026	"La Rumba del Perdón" (with Estrella Morente and Sílvia Pérez Cruz)	Girl Power	Nominated	
Premios Juventud	2026	Lux Tour	Best Tour	Nominated	
Premio Lo Nuestro	2019	"Malamente"	Video of the Year	Nominated	
Premio Lo Nuestro	2020	Herself	Female Artist of the Year	Nominated	
Premio Lo Nuestro	2020	Herself	Breakthrough Female Artist of the Year	Won	
Premio Lo Nuestro	2020	Herself	Female Artist of the Year - Urban	Nominated	
Premio Lo Nuestro	2021	"Relación (Remix)" (with Sech, Daddy Yankee, J Balvin, & Farruko)	Remix of the Year	Nominated	
Premio Lo Nuestro	2021	"TKN" (with Travis Scott)	Crossover Collaboration of the Year	Nominated	
Premio Lo Nuestro	2021	"TKN" (with Travis Scott)	Video of the Year	Won	
Premio Lo Nuestro	2022	Herself	Pop Solo Act of the Year	Nominated	
Premio Lo Nuestro	2022	"La Noche de Anoche" (with Bad Bunny)	Urban Collaboration of the Year	Nominated	
Premio Lo Nuestro	2023	Motomami	Album of the Year	Nominated	
Premio Lo Nuestro	2023	Motomami	Urban Album of the Year	Nominated	
Premio Lo Nuestro	2023	"Despechá"	Pop-Urban/Dance Song of the Year	Nominated	
Premio Lo Nuestro	2023	"La Fama" (with The Weeknd)	Crossover Collaboration of the Year	Won	
Premio Lo Nuestro	2023	"El Pañuelo" (with Romeo Santos)	The Best Mix	Nominated	
Premio Lo Nuestro	2023	Herself	Female Urban Artist of the Year	Nominated	
Premio Lo Nuestro	2023	Motomami World Tour	Tour of the Year	Nominated	
Premio Lo Nuestro	2024	"Despechá"	Song of the Year	Nominated	
Premio Lo Nuestro	2024	"El Pañuelo" (with Romeo Santos)	The Best Mix	Nominated	
Premio Lo Nuestro	2024	"El Pañuelo" (with Romeo Santos)	Tropical Collaboration of the Year	Won	
Premio Lo Nuestro	2024	"Besos Moja2" (with Wisin & Yandel)	Urban Song of the Year	Nominated	
Premio Lo Nuestro	2024	"Beso" (with Rauw Alejandro)	Pop-Urban Collaboration of the Year	Nominated	
Premio Lo Nuestro	2024	Herself	Female Pop Artist of the Year	Nominated	
Premios Odeón	2020	El Mal Querer	Album of the Year	Nominated	
Premios Odeón	2020	Herself	Best Female Artist	Nominated	
Premios Odeón	2020	"Con Altura" (with J Balvin featuring El Guincho)	Best Music Video	Won	
Premios Odeón	2020	"Malamente"	Best Music Video	Nominated	
Premios Odeón	2020	"Yo x Ti, Tu x Mi" (with Ozuna)	Best Music Video	Nominated	
Premios Odeón	2020	"Con Altura" (with J Balvin featuring El Guincho)	Song of the Year	Nominated	
Premios Odeón	2020	"Malamente"	Song of the Year	Nominated	
Premios Odeón	2020	"Milionària"	Song of the Year	Nominated	
Premios Odeón	2020	"Yo x Ti, Tu x Mi" (with Ozuna)	Song of the Year	Nominated	
Premios Odeón	2021	"TKN" (with Travis Scott)	Best Music Video	Nominated	
Premios Odeón	2021	Herself	Best Pop Artist	Nominated	
Premios Odeón	2022	"La Fama" (with The Weeknd)	Song of the Year	Nominated	
Premios Odeón	2022	"La Fama" (with The Weeknd)	Best Pop Song	Nominated	
Premios Odeón	2023	Motomami	Album of the Year	Won	
Premios Odeón	2024	"Beso" (with Rauw Alejandro)	Best Pop Song	Won	
Premios Odeón	2026	"La Perla" (with Yahritza y su Esencia)	Best Pop Song	Won	
Premios Odeón	2026	Lux	Album of the Year	Won	
Premios Ondas	2019	Herself	Musical Phenomenon of the Year	Honoree	
Premios Ondas	2026	Lux	Musical Phenomenon of the Year	Honoree	
Premios Ondas	2026	Lux	Most Innovative Campaign of the Year	Honoree	
Premios Quiero	2019	"Con Altura" (with J Balvin featuring El Guincho)	Best Collaboration	Nominated	
Premios Quiero	2019	"Con Altura" (with J Balvin featuring El Guincho)	Best Choreography	Nominated	
Premios Quiero	2022	"Despechá"	Video of the Year	Nominated	
Premios Quiero	2022	"Despechá"	Best Female Video	Nominated	
Premio Ruido	2017	Los Ángeles	Best Album from Spain	Won	
Premio Ruido	2018	El Mal Querer	Best Album from Spain	Won	
Premio Ruido	2022	Motomami	Best Album from Spain	Nominated	
Premio Ruido	2025	Lux	Best Album from Spain	Nominated	
Premios Telehit	2019	"Con Altura" (with J Balvin featuring El Guincho)	Best Urban Video	Won	
Premios Telehit	2019	"Con Altura" (with J Balvin featuring El Guincho)	Best Urban Song	Nominated	
Premios Telehit	2019	Herself	Best Solo Female Artist	Nominated	
Premios Time Out Barcelona	2017	Los ángeles	Best Work	Won	
Premios Tu Música Urbano	2019	"Malamente"	International Artist Video	Nominated	
Premios Tu Música Urbano	2020	"Malamente"	Female Song of the Year	Nominated	
Premios Tu Música Urbano	2020	Herself	Top New Generation - Female	Won	
Premios Tu Música Urbano	2020	"Yo x Ti, Tu x Mi" (with Ozuna)	Top Song - Pop Urban	Nominated	
Premios Tu Música Urbano	2020	"Yo x Ti, Tu x Mi" (with Ozuna)	Video of the Year	Nominated	
Premios Tu Música Urbano	2020	"Con Altura" (with J Balvin featuring El Guincho)	Video of the Year	Nominated	
Premios Tu Música Urbano	2020	"Con Altura" (with J Balvin featuring El Guincho)	Collaboration of the Year - New Generation	Nominated	
Premios Tu Música Urbano	2020	El Mal Querer	Album of the Year - Female	Nominated	
Premios Tu Música Urbano	2022	Herself	Top Female Artist	Nominated	
Premios Tu Música Urbano	2022	Herself	Top Artist - Pop Urban	Nominated	
Premios Tu Música Urbano	2022	"La Fama" (with The Weeknd)	Top Crossover Song	Nominated	
Premios Tu Música Urbano	2022	"La Fama" (with The Weeknd)	Video of the Year	Nominated	
Premios Tu Música Urbano	2022	"Linda" (with Tokischa)	Top Song - Dembow	Nominated	
Premios Tu Música Urbano	2022	Motomami	Album of the Year - Female Artist	Nominated	
Premios Tu Música Urbano	2023	Motomami	Album of the Year - Female Artist	Nominated	
Premios Tu Música Urbano	2023	Herself	Artist of the Year	Nominated	
Premios Tu Música Urbano	2023	Herself	Top Artist - Pop Urban	Nominated	
Premios Tu Música Urbano	2023	Herself	Top Social Artist	Nominated	
Premios Tu Música Urbano	2023	"Despechá"	Song of the Year	Nominated	
Premios Tu Música Urbano	2023	"Besos Moja2" (with Wisin & Yandel)	Song of the Year - Duo or Group	Won	
Premios Tu Música Urbano	2023	"LLYLM"	Top Song - Pop Urban	Nominated	
Premios Tu Música Urbano	2023	Motomami World Tour	Concert/Tour of the Year	Nominated	
Premios Tu Música Urbano	2026	Herself	Female Artist of the Year	Nominated	
Premios Tu Música Urbano	2026	"La Perla" (with Yahritza y su Esencia)	Song of the Year	Nominated	
Premios Tu Música Urbano	2026	Reliquia	Top Song - Pop	Nominated	
Premios Tu Música Urbano	2026	Lux	Album of the Year - Female Artist	Nominated	
Premis ADG Laus	2018	Rosalía és betevé	Audiovisuals	Silver	
Premis ADG Laus	2019	"Pienso en tu mirá"	Videoclips	Silver	
Premis ADG Laus	2021	"TKN" (with Travis Scott)	Videoclips	Gold	
Premis ADG Laus	2021	"TKN" (with Travis Scott)	Lettering / Experimental Typography	Bronze	
Premis ADG Laus	2023	"Motomami (Rosalía TikTok Live Performance)"	Videoclips	Gold	
Premis ADG Laus	2024	Cupra x Rosalía - ABCDEFG	Art Direction - Advertising	Gold	
Premis ADG Laus	2026	"Berghain" (with Björk and Yves Tumor)	Art Direction - Audiovisual	Gold	
Premis Alicia a la Música Catalana	2019	El Mal Querer	Authorship	Nominated	
Premis Alicia a la Música Catalana	2019	El Mal Querer	Best Production	Won	
Premis Alicia a la Música Catalana	2019	Herself	Best Live	Nominated	
Premis Alicia a la Música Catalana	2019	Herself	Internationalization	Won	
Premis Alicia a la Música Catalana	2022	Herself	Internationalization	Won	
Premis Alicia a la Música Catalana	2023	Herself	Internationalization	Won	
Premis Alicia a la Música Catalana	2023	Motomami	Authorship	Nominated	
Premis Alicia a la Música Catalana	2023	Motomami	Best Production	Nominated	
Premis Alicia a la Música Catalana	2026	Herself	Internationalization	Nominated	
Premis Altaveu	2019	Herself	Excellence Award	Won	
Premis ARC	2019	El Mal Querer Tour	Best Tour by a Catalan Artist	Won	
Premis Ciutat de Barcelona	2018	El Mal Querer	Music	Won	
Premis Enderrock	2019	El Mal Querer	Best Non-Catalan Album	Won	
Premis Enderrock	2019	Herself	Best Non-Catalan-Singing Act	Won	
Premis Enderrock	2020	"Milionària"	Best Music Video	Nominated	
Premis Enderrock	2020	Herself	Best Artist	Nominated	
Premis Enderrock	2020	Herself	Best Non-Catalan-Singing Act	Won	
Premis Enderrock	2023	Motomami	Best Album of the Year	Won	
Premis Enderrock	2023	Motomami	Best Non-Catalan Album	Nominated	
Premis Enderrock	2026	Lux	Special Jury Prize	Won	
Premis Enderrock	2026	Lux	Best Non-Catalan Album	Nominated	
Pure Charts Awards	2023	Herself	International Female Artist of the Year	Nominated	
Rober Awards Music Prize	2017	"I See a Darkness"	Best Cover Version	Nominated	
Rober Awards Music Prize	2017	Herself	Best Hispanic Artist	Nominated	
Rober Awards Music Prize	2018	Herself	Best Hispanic Artist	Won	
Rober Awards Music Prize	2018	Herself	Best Pop Artist	Won	
Rober Awards Music Prize	2018	Herself	Best Female Artist	Nominated	
Rober Awards Music Prize	2018	"Malamente"	Song of the Year	Won	
Rober Awards Music Prize	2018	"Malamente"	Best Promo Video	Nominated	
Rober Awards Music Prize	2018	El Mal Querer	Album of the Year	Nominated	
Rober Awards Music Prize	2019	Herself	Best Latin Artist	Won	
Rober Awards Music Prize	2019	Herself	Best Pop Artist	Nominated	
Rober Awards Music Prize	2019	Herself	Best Live Artist	Nominated	
Rolling Stone en Español Awards	2023	Herself	Artist of the Year	Nominated	
Rolling Stone en Español Awards	2023	Herself	Music Producer of the Year	Nominated	
Rolling Stone en Español Awards	2023	Motomami	Album of the Year	Nominated	
Rolling Stone en Español Awards	2023	"Despechá"	Song of the Year	Nominated	
Rolling Stone en Español Awards	2023	"Saoko"	Music Video of the Year	Nominated	
Rolling Stone en Español Awards	2026	Herself	Artist of the Year	Pending	
Rolling Stone en Español Awards	2026	Lux	Album of the Year	Pending	
Rolling Stone en Español Awards	2026	"La Perla" (with Yahritza y su Esencia)	Song of the Year	Pending	
Rolling Stone en Español Awards	2026	Lux Tour	Best Live Performance	Pending	
SEC Awards (Note: Note: The SEC Awards (formerly known as Séries em Cena Awards) is a Brazilian Award Show. It awards movies, tv series, music and internet influencers. It was created in 2019.)	2023	Herself	International Female Artist of the Year	Nominated	
SEC Awards	2025	"New Woman" (with Lisa)	Collaboration International of the Year	Nominated	
SEC Awards	2026	Lux	Album/EP International of the Year	Nominated	
Shark Music Video Awards	2018	"Malamente"	Best Music Video – International	Won	
Shark Music Video Awards	2018	"Malamente"	Best Editing – International	Won	
Shark Music Video Awards	2023	Motomami (song)	Best Editing – International	Nominated	
Shark Music Video Awards	2023	"Motomami (Rosalía TikTok Live Performance)"	Best Artiste Performance – International	Nominated	
Shark Music Video Awards	2024	"Vampiros" (with Rauw Alejandro)	Best Production Design – International	Nominated	
Shark Music Video Awards	2026	"Berghain" (with Björk and Yves Tumor)	Best Music Video – International	Grand Prix	
Shark Music Video Awards	2026	"Berghain" (with Björk and Yves Tumor)	Best Direction – International	Won	
Shark Music Video Awards	2026	"Berghain" (with Björk and Yves Tumor)	Best Editing – International	Nominated	
Shark Music Video Awards	2026	"Berghain" (with Björk and Yves Tumor)	Best Production Design – International	Nominated	
Shark Music Video Awards	2026	"Berghain" (with Björk and Yves Tumor)	Best Writing/Idea/Concept – International	Nominated	
Shark Music Video Awards	2026	"Berghain" (with Björk and Yves Tumor)	Best Pop Video – International	Nominated	
Shots Awards EMEA	2023	"Vampiros" (with Rauw Alejandro)	Music Video of the Year	Shortlisted	
Shots Awards EMEA	2026	"Berghain" (with Björk and Yves Tumor)	Music Video of the Year	Gold	
Swiss Music Awards	2023	Herself	Best Breaking Act International	Won	
Teen Choice Awards	2019	Herself	Choice Breakout Artist	Nominated	
Teen Choice Awards	2019	"Con Altura" (with J Balvin featuring El Guincho)	Choice Latin Song	Nominated	
The Daily Californian's Arts Awards	2022	Motomami	Best International Album	Won	
The Daily Californian's Arts Awards	2022	Herself	Best International Artist	Won	
The 1.4 Awards	2020	"TKN" (with Travis Scott)	Music Video	Shortlisted	
The 1.4 Awards	2022	"El Pañuelo" (with Romeo Santos)	Music Video	Shortlisted	
The 1.4 Awards	2026	"Berghain" (with Björk and Yves Tumor)	Music Video	Gold	
UK Music Video Awards	2017	"De Plata"	Best Styling in a Video	Nominated	
UK Music Video Awards	2018	"Malamente"	Best Styling in a Video	Nominated	
UK Music Video Awards	2018	"Malamente"	Best Production Design in a Video	Nominated	
UK Music Video Awards	2018	"Malamente"	Best Pop Video - International	Won	
UK Music Video Awards	2018	"Pienso en tu Mirá"	Best Pop Video - International	Nominated	
UK Music Video Awards	2019	"Aute Cuture"	Best Pop Video - International	Nominated	
UK Music Video Awards	2019	"De aquí no sales"	Best Pop Video - International	Won	
UK Music Video Awards	2019	"De aquí no sales"	Best Styling in a Video	Nominated	
UK Music Video Awards	2019	Herself	Best Artist	Nominated	
UK Music Video Awards	2020	"A Palé"	Best Pop Video - International	Nominated	
UK Music Video Awards	2020	"Juro Que"	Best Pop Video - International	Nominated	
UK Music Video Awards	2020	"TKN" (with Travis Scott)	Best Pop Video - International	Nominated	
UK Music Video Awards	2022	"Saoko"	Best Pop Video - International	Won	
UK Music Video Awards	2023	"El Pañuelo" (with Romeo Santos)	Best Production Design in a Video	Nominated	
UK Music Video Awards	2026	"Berghain" (with Björk and Yves Tumor)	Best Pop Video - International	Won	
UK Music Video Awards	2026	"Berghain" (with Björk and Yves Tumor)	Best Styling in a Video	Won	
Variety Hitmakers Awards	2026	Lux	Hitmakers Masterpiece of the Decade	Honoree	
Videoclip Italia Awards	2026	"Berghain" (with Björk and Yves Tumor)	Best Music Video International	Won	
Video Prisma Awards	2022	"Despechá"	Favorite Video	Nominated	
Video Prisma Awards	2022	"El Pañuelo" (with Romeo Santos)	Latin Video	Nominated	
Video Prisma Awards	2023	"Vampiros" (with Rauw Alejandro)	Latin Video	Nominated	
Video Prisma Awards	2026	"Berghain" (with Björk and Yves Tumor)	Best Video (International)	Won	
Video Prisma Awards	2026	"Berghain" (with Björk and Yves Tumor)	Best Cinematography (International)	Nominated	
Video Prisma Awards	2026	"Berghain" (with Björk and Yves Tumor)	Best Art Direction (International)	Nominated	
Webby Awards	2021	La Rosalía: The Sound of Energy, Freedom and Love	Best Editing – Video & Film	Nominated	
Webby Awards	2022	"La Fama" (with The Weeknd)	Music Video – Video & Film	Honoree	
Webby Awards	2023	"LLYLM"	Music (Branded) – Video & Film	Won	
Webby Awards	2023	Spotify/Rosalía	Best Video Editing – Advertising, Media & PR	Honoree	
Webby Awards	2026	"Berghain" (with Björk and Yves Tumor)	Music Video – Video & Film	Nominated	
Webby Awards	2026	The Zane Lowe Show "ROSALÍA: The LUX Interview"	Interview or Talk Show – Video & Film	Nominated	
WME Awards	2022	"Despechá"	Latin American Song	Nominated	
WSJ. Magazine Innovator Awards	2026	Herself	Music Innovator	Honoree	
