= Vampiros (song) =

2023 song by Rosalía and Rauw Alejandro

Song by Rosalía and Rauw Alejandro

from the EP RR
- Released: March 24, 2023
- Recorded: 2022
- Studio: Ark Studios (Los Angeles); Motomami House (Miami); Ocean Bravo Studios (Atlanta); Sleeper Sounds (London); Rue Boyer (Paris)
- Genre: Reggaeton · goth rock
- Length: 2:56
- Label: Columbia; Sony Latin
- Songwriter(s): Raúl Alejandro Ocasio; Rosalia Vila Tobella
- Producer(s): Rosalía; Noah Goldstein; Dylan Patrice; Jake Miller; El Zorro

Music video
- "Vampiros" on YouTube

"Vampiros" (transl. "Vampires") is a song Spanish singer Rosalía and Puerto Rican singer Rauw Alejandro for their collaborative extended play, RR (2023). The song's production was handled by Dylan Patrice, Alejandro, Rosalía, Jake Miller, and Noah Goldstein. It was released by Columbia Records in partnership with Sony Music Latin on March 24, 2023, along with the rest of the EP. A Spanish-language reggaeton track with goth rock elements, driven by heavy drums, it is a carpe diem song, in which they sing about making the most out of a night together.

== Background ==
After months of exchanging Instagram direct messages, Rosalía and Rauw Alejandro met in person in Las Vegas during the 20th Annual Latin Grammy Awards in November 2019 and fell in love with each other. They began dating privately and worked together on several musical projects; Rosalía was featured as a background vocalist on Alejandro's "Dile a Él" (2020) and "Corazón Despeinado" (2022), and co-wrote "Caprichoso" (2022), while Alejandro co-wrote Rosalía's "Chicken Teriyaki" (2022). They made their relationship public in September 2021. During an interview with Billboard in May 2022, Alejandro spoke about collaborating with Rosalía:

For sure, we have a few [things planned] in the studio already. It's a surprise. Those songs are [under] extra security. We're planning to do the release — I'm not going to say when, but soon. We're doing it for the love of the fans and she's my girl and I did those songs with more love.

On March 13, 2023, the couple announced that they would release a three-song collaborative extended play titled RR on March 24, and revealed the tracks' titles as "Beso", "Vampiros", and "Promesa". On March 23, 2023, Rosalía shared a preview of "Vampiros" on Instagram Live. RR was released for digital download and streaming by Columbia Records the following day, and "Vampiros" was included as the second track.

== Music video ==
Alejandro and Rosalía attended the Wednesday-regular Bresh party at Sala Apolo, in Barcelona, on February 22, 2023. Images of the singers in and outside the club quickly became viral on social media. After sharing a preview of the music video on April 11, 2023, those images were confirmed to be part of the project. The video itself, directed by Stillz ("Candy", "La Noche de Anoche") and produced by Canada ("Malamente", "Pienso en Tu Mirá", "TKN"), premiered on April 13 on YouTube. It features Rosalía and Alejandro in several locations in Barcelona; partying, walking through Ciutat Vella, and driving a sports car. It was filmed over the course of two days in late February 2023 in Barcelona and Esplugues de Llobregat. Other locations include Bar Marsella, Espai Corberó, and a famous churrería van located in Carrer Marina.

== Credits and personnel ==
Credits adapted from the liner notes of RR.

Publishing

- Recorded by David Rodríguez at Ark Studios (Los Angeles), Motomami House (Miami, Florida), Ocean Bravo Studios (Atlanta, Georgia), Sleeper Sounds (London) and Rue Boyer (Paris)
- Mixed by Manny Marroquín at Larrabee Studio (North Hollywood, California).
- Mastered by Chris Gehringer at Sterling Sound (Edgewater, New Jersey).

Production personnel

- Rosalía Vila – associated performer, composer, lyricist, producer, vocal, vocal producer
- Raúl Alejandro – associated performer, composer, lyricist, producer, vocal
- Noah Goldstein – production, synthesizer, drums
- Dylan Patrice – production, synthesizer, live drums
- Jacob Miller – production, synthesizer
- William J. Sullivan – additional vocals

Technical personnel

- Manny Marroquin – mixing
- Daniella Leon – assistant mix engineer
- Claude Vause – assistant mix engineer
- Rémy Dumelz – assistant mix engineer
- Lucas Glastra – assistant mix engineer
- Jack Laiheugue – assistant mix engineer
- Marius Van Mierlo – assistant mix engineer
- Chris Gehringer – mastering

== Charts ==
Chart performance for "Vampiros"
Chart (2022)	Peak position
Global 200 (Billboard)	163
Portugal (AFP)	100
Spain (PROMUSICAE)	7
Switzerland (Schweizer Hitparade)	75
US Hot Latin Songs (Billboard)	32

== Certifications ==
Certifications for "Vampiros"
Region	Certification	Certified units/sales
Spain (PROMUSICAE)	Platinum	60,000^{‡}
^{‡} Sales+streaming figures based on certification alone.
