= Beso (song) =

2023 single by Rosalía and Rauw Alejandro

Single by Rosalía and Rauw Alejandro

from the EP RR
- Language: Spanish
- English title: "Kiss"
- Released: March 24, 2023
- Studio: Ark Studios (Los Angeles); Motomami House (Miami); Ocean Bravo Studios (Atlanta); Sleeper Sounds (London); Rue Boyer (Paris)
- Genre: Emo; reggaeton; pop
- Length: 3:14
- Label: Columbia; Sony Latin
- Songwriters: Raúl Alejandro Ocasio; Rosalia Vila Tobella
- Producers: Dylan Patrice; El Zorro; Rosalía; Noah Goldstein

Rosalía singles chronology
"LLYLM" (2023)	"Beso" (2023)	"Tuya" (2023)

Rauw Alejandro singles chronology
"Tamo en Nota" (2023)	"Beso" (2023)	"Rauw Alejandro: Bzrp Music Sessions, Vol. 56" (2023)

Music video
- "Beso" on YouTube

"Beso" (transl. "Kiss") is a song by Spanish singer Rosalía and Puerto Rican singer Rauw Alejandro for their collaborative extended play, RR (2023). The song's production was handled by Dylan Patrice, Alejandro, Rosalía, and Noah Goldstein. It was released by Columbia Records in partnertship with Sony Music Latin on March 24, 2023, as the lead single from the EP. A Spanish-language emo reggaeton and pop track, with an upbeat keyboard melody, it is a love song, in which they sing about longing for a kiss with each other, as well as their fear of separation.

"Beso" received positive reviews from music critics, who assumed that it would be one of the songs of the summer. The song was commercially successful, reaching number one in Spain, as well as the top five in several other countries such as Chile and Switzerland, and on Billboard's Hot Latin Songs in the United States. It also reached the summit of Latin Digital Song Sales and peaked at number 10 on Billboard Global 200. The song has received several certifications, including 8× platinum in Spain and diamond in France. An accompanying music video, released simultaneously with the song, was mainly made up of videos recorded by the singers in selfie mode and features a series of key moments the two had spent together during their relationship. They confirmed their engagement at the end of the video.

== Background and release ==
After months of exchanging Instagram direct messages, Rosalía and Rauw Alejandro met in person in Las Vegas during the 20th Annual Latin Grammy Awards in November 2019 and fell in love with each other. They began dating privately and worked together on several musical projects; Rosalía was featured as a background vocalist on Alejandro's "Dile a Él" (2020) and "Corazón Despeinado" (2022), and co-wrote "Caprichoso" (2022), while Alejandro co-wrote Rosalía's "Chicken Teriyaki" (2022). They made their relationship public in September 2021. During an interview with Billboard in May 2022, Alejandro spoke about collaborating with Rosalía:

For sure, we have a few [things planned] in the studio already. It's a surprise. Those songs are [under] extra security. We're planning to do the release — I'm not going to say when, but soon. We're doing it for the love of the fans and she's my girl and I did those songs with more love.

On March 13, 2023, the couple announced that they would release a three-song collaborative extended play titled RR on March 24, and revealed the tracks' titles as "Beso", "Vampiros", and "Promesa". On March 15, 2023, Rosalía shared a preview of "Beso" on TikTok, in which she was seen "on the verge of sharing a kiss" with Alejandro, while they were singing the song to each other. RR was released for digital download and streaming by Columbia Records on March 24, 2023, and "Beso" was included as the first track. On the same day, the song was picked as the lead single promoting the project, issued by Sony Music to Italian and Latin American radio stations.

== Music and lyrics ==
"Beso"
A 19-second sample of the song's chorus, which blends both Rosalía and Alejandro's voices.

Musically, "Beso" is a Spanish language emo reggaeton and pop song, with an upbeat keyboard melody. The New York Times reviewer Jon Pareles noted the singers' "high, small and tremulous" vocals over "a brusque beat topped with quasi-Baroque keyboards and strings". The track was written by Alejandro and Rosalía, while the production was handled by Dylan Patrice, Alejandro, Rosalía, and Noah Goldstein. It runs for a total of 3 minutes and 14 seconds. Lyrically, "Beso" which translates to "Kiss" in English, is a love song, in which they sing about longing for a kiss with each other, as well as their fear of separation. The lyrics include, "Ya yo necesito otro beso / Uno de esos que tú me da' / Estar lejos de ti e' el infierno / Estar cerca de ti es mi paz" (I need another kiss / One of those that you give to me / Being away from you is hell / Being close to you is my peace).

== Critical reception ==
Upon release, "Beso" was met with widely positive reviews from music critics. Writing for Cosmopolitan, Natalia Arroyo assumed that it "is going to be one of the songs of the summer". Similarly, Happy FM staff labeled the track "a song that sounds like a hit" and believed that it "will be played a lot in the coming months", noting that "it has all the ingredients to be a new hit for the couple artists of the moment".

== Commercial performance ==
"Beso" became a global hit, bounding in Billboard Global 200 at number 10, with 50 million streams and 3,000 digital downloads sold worldwide in its first week. The song also debuted at number seven on Billboard Global Excl. US, earning Alejandro his fifth top 10 on the chart and Rosalía her fourth. The song debuted and peaked at number four on the US Billboard Hot Latin Songs chart on April 8, 2023, with a first-week tally of 2,000 downloads sold, 9.1 million streams, and 3 million radio impressions. Thus, it became Rosalía's seventh top 10 hit on the chart and Alejandro's tenth. It also reached number one on the US Latin Digital Song Sales, number ten on Latin Airplay, number three on Latin Rhythm Airplay, and number two on Latin Pop Airplay charts. On the US Billboard Hot 100, "Beso" debuted and peaked at number 52, giving both Rosalía and Alejandro their seventh entry. It also became the former's highest-charting song in her career, surpassing "La Noche de Anoche". In Canada, "Beso" debuted at number 85 on Billboard's Canadian Hot 100 on the chart issue dated April 8, 2023, earning Rosalía her fifth entry, and Alejandro his third. The song reached its peak of number 75 in the country on April 29, 2023.

Besides North America, "Beso" hit the charts in several European countries, including the Netherlands and Italy. In Switzerland, the song debuted at number three on April 2, 2023, becoming Rosalía's second top-10 hit in the country and Alejandro's first. It also peaked at numbers three and seven in Portugal and Luxembourg, respectively. In Spain's official weekly chart, the song debuted at number-one on April 2, 2023, becoming Rosalía's 11th number one hit in the country and Alejandro's fourth. The track was later certified 8× platinum by the Productores de Música de España (PROMUSICAE), for track-equivalent sales of over 480,000 units in the country. In France, "Beso" debuted at number 45 on March 25, 2023, becoming Rosalía's eighth entry, and Alejandro's fourth. It subsequently peaked at number seven on the chart on July 29, 2023, giving Rosalía and Alejandro their third and first top-10 hit, respectively. The song was later certified diamond by the Syndicat National de l'Édition Phonographique (SNEP), for track-equivalent sales of 333,333 units in the country.

== Promotion ==
=== Music video ===
A screenshot from the music video, depicting Rosalía and Alejandro kissing each other in the snow.

During an interview with Ibai Llanos, Rosalía and Alejandro confirmed that all three tracks off RR would be accompanied by music videos. On March 21, 2023, the two shared a trailer for "Beso" music video on social media, announcing that it would be released simultaneously with the EP on March 24. The visual was released on the specified date. It features a series of key moments the two had spent together during their relationship — from their concerts backstage and the studio to vacations and international trips to countries such as France and Japan. The video is mainly made up of videos recorded by themselves in selfie mode. In the final scene, when the music fades, the couple confirms their engagement. Teary-eyed Rosalía shows the camera a ring with a huge diamond, saying: "Oh my god and my mascara is all runny now. I love you". As she holds her phone with one hand, and the brown ring box with the other, she looks at Alejandro and kisses him. In her reviews for Billboard, Isabela Raygoza described the music video as "beautiful", and praised how they announced their engagement in "the sweetest" and the "most creative" ways.

=== Live performances ===
Alejandro performed "Beso" for the first time at Barclays Center in Brooklyn, during his concert as part of the Saturno World Tour on March 24, 2023. On the same night, Rosalía performed the track among her other songs at the 2023 Festival Estéreo Picnic in Bogotá, as part of her '23 "Festivales" tour. One week later, the two performed the song for the first time together at Hiram Bithorn Stadium in San Juan, Puerto Rico, during Alejandro's show as part of the Saturno World Tour. On April 15, 2023, Rosalía brought out Alejandro during her performance at the 2023 Coachella Festival and performed "Beso" together.

== Credits and personnel ==
Credits adapted from Tidal.

- Rosalía – associated performer, composer, lyricist, producer, vocal, vocal producer
- Rauw Alejandro – associated performer, composer, lyricist, producer, vocal
- Dylan Patrice – producer, bass, piano, synthesizer
- Noah Goldstein – producer, synthesizer
- Lucas Glastra – assistant engineer
- Claude Vause – assistant engineer
- Rémy Dumelz – assistant engineer
- Marius Van Mierlo – assistant engineer
- Jack Laiheugue – assistant engineer
- Daniella Leon – assistant engineer
- Chris Gehringer – mastering engineer
- Manny Marroquin – mixing engineer
- David Rodríguez – recording engineer, vocal producer
- Abraham Mansfaroll – percussion

== Charts ==
=== Weekly charts ===
Chart performance for "Beso"
Chart (2023)	Peak position
Argentina Hot 100 (Billboard)	11
Argentina (Monitor Latino)	5
Belgium (Ultratop 50 Wallonia)	40
Bolivia (Monitor Latino)	10
Bolivia (Billboard)	10
Brazil Latin (Crowley Charts)	5
Canada Hot 100 (Billboard)	75
Chile (Monitor Latino)	8
Chile (Billboard)	3
Central America (Monitor Latino)	5
Colombia (Monitor Latino)	10
Colombia (Billboard)	9
Costa Rica (Monitor Latino)	4
Dominican Republic (Monitor Latino)	1
Ecuador (Monitor Latino)	14
Ecuador (Billboard)	10
El Salvador (Monitor Latino)	4
France (SNEP)	7
Global 200 (Billboard)	10
Guatemala (Monitor Latino)	8
Honduras (Monitor Latino)	14
Ireland (IRMA)	52
Italy (FIMI)	23
Latin America (Monitor Latino)	2
Lithuania Airplay (TopHit)	61
Luxembourg (Billboard)	5
Mexico (Monitor Latino)	6
Mexico (Billboard)	16
Netherlands (Single Top 100)	98
New Zealand Hot Singles (RMNZ)	32
Nicaragua Pop (Monitor Latino)	8
Panama (Monitor Latino)	2
Paraguay (Monitor Latino)	1
Peru (Monitor Latino)	17
Peru (Billboard)	10
Portugal (AFP)	3
Puerto Rico (Monitor Latino)	1
Spain (Promusicae)	1
Suriname (Nationale Top 40)	19
Sweden Heatseeker (Sverigetopplistan)	11
Switzerland (Schweizer Hitparade)	3
Uruguay (Monitor Latino)	3
US Billboard Hot 100	52
US Hot Latin Songs (Billboard)	4
US Latin Airplay (Billboard)	10
US Latin Pop Airplay (Billboard)	2
US Latin Rhythm Airplay (Billboard)	3
US Rhythmic Airplay (Billboard)	30
Venezuela Pop (Monitor Latino)	5

=== Monthly charts ===
Monthly chart position for "Beso"
Chart (2023)	Peak position
Paraguay (SGP)	3
Uruguay (CUDISCO)	10

=== Year-end charts ===
2023 year-end chart performance for "Beso"
Chart (2023)	Position
Argentina (Monitor Latino)	36
Belgium (Ultratop 50 Wallonia)	80
Bolivia (Monitor Latino)	49
Central America (Monitor Latino)	18
Chile (Monitor Latino)	14
Colombia (Monitor Latino)	59
Costa Rica (Monitor Latino)	10
Dominican Republic (Monitor Latino)	4
Ecuador (Monitor Latino)	54
El Salvador (Monitor Latino)	22
Global 200 (Billboard)	92
Guatemala (Monitor Latino)	31
Honduras Pop (Monitor Latino)	15
Italy (FIMI)	50
Latin America (Monitor Latino)	15
Mexico Pop (Monitor Latino)	29
Nicaragua (Monitor Latino)	66
Panama (Monitor Latino)	20
Paraguay (Monitor Latino)	17
Peru (Monitor Latino)	64
Puerto Rico (Monitor Latino)	8
Spain (PROMUSICAE)	9
Switzerland (Schweizer Hitparade)	15
Uruguay (Monitor Latino)	18
US Hot Latin Songs (Billboard)	25
US Latin Airplay (Billboard)	28
US Latin Pop Airplay (Billboard)	4
US Latin Rhythm Airplay (Billboard)	14
Venezuela (Monitor Latino)	68

== Certifications ==
Certifications and sales for "Beso"
Region	Certification	Certified units/sales
Belgium (BRMA)	Gold	20,000^{‡}
Brazil (Pro-Música Brasil)	Platinum	40,000^{‡}
France (SNEP)	Diamond	333,333^{‡}
Italy (FIMI)	2× Platinum	200,000^{‡}
Mexico (AMPROFON)	4× Platinum+Gold	630,000^{‡}
Portugal (AFP)	3× Platinum	30,000^{‡}
Spain (Promusicae)	8× Platinum	480,000^{‡}
Switzerland (IFPI Switzerland)	Gold	10,000^{‡}
United States (RIAA)	Platinum	1,000,000^{‡}
^{‡} Sales+streaming figures based on certification alone.

== Release history ==
Release dates and formats for "Beso"
Region	Date	Format(s)	Label	Ref.
Latin America	March 24, 2023	Contemporary hit radio	Sony Music	
Italy	March 24, 2023	Contemporary hit radio	Sony Music	
United States	May 2, 2023	Rhythmic radio	Sony Music Latin; Columbia	

== See also ==
- List of number-one singles of 2023 (Spain)
