= RR (EP) =

2023 EP by Rosalía and Rauw Alejandro

EP by Rosalía and Rauw Alejandro
- Released: March 24, 2023
- Length: 9:26
- Language: Spanish
- Label: Columbia; Duars; Sony Latin
- Producer: Rosalía; Noah Goldstein; Dylan Patrice; El Zorro; Jake Miller

Rosalía chronology
Motomami (2022)	RR (2023)	Lux (2025)

Rauw Alejandro chronology
Saturno (2022)	RR (2023)	Playa Saturno (2023)

Singles from RR
- 1. "Beso" Released: March 24, 2023

Professional ratings
Review scores
Source	Rating
Mondo Sonoro	7/10

RR (stylized as RЯ or R∞Я) is a collaborative extended play (EP) by Spanish singer Rosalía and Puerto Rican singer Rauw Alejandro. It was released on March 24, 2023.

== Background ==
Rosalía and Alejandro were first rumored to be dating in August 2021 after being seen in public together by paparazzi. They confirmed their relationship the next month with photos of the two celebrating Rosalía's 29th birthday together. In May 2022, Alejandro told Billboard that they had been working together in the studio and had material with plans to release it. Rosalía confirmed this in her own Billboard interview in November. The project was announced on March 13, 2023, with the cover art, track list, and release date posted to social media.

== Single ==
The EP was released March 24. The same day, a single and music video were released for "Beso". The video consists of slice-of-life shots of the couple traveling the globe along with concert footage and behind-the-scenes tour clips. The end of the video shows Rosalía wearing a Cartier engagement ring, revealing that the couple are engaged.

== Track listing ==
All tracks are written by Rosalia Vila Tobella and Raúl Alejandro Ocasio.

RR track listing
No.	Title	Producer(s)	Length
1.	"Beso"	Rosalía; Noah Goldstein; Dylan Patrice; El Zorro	3:14
2.	"Vampiros"	Rosalía; Noah Goldstein; Dylan Patrice; Jake Miller; El Zorro	2:56
3.	"Promesa"	Rosalía; Noah Goldstein; Dylan Patrice; El Zorro	3:16
Total length:			9:26

== Personnel ==
Musicians

- Rosalía – vocals
- Rauw Alejandro – vocals
- Dylan Patrice – synthesizer (all tracks), bass guitar (tracks 1, 3), piano (1), drums (2)
- Noah Goldstein – synthesizer (all tracks), drums (1, 2), drum machine (3)
- Abraham Mansfarrol – percussion (1, 3)
- William J. Sullivan – background vocals (2)
- Jake Miller – synthesizer (2)
- Juan Diego Valencia – clapping (3)
- Makarines – clapping (3)
- Manuel Valencia – clapping (3)

Technical

- Rosalía – production, vocal production
- Dylan Patrice – production
- El Zorro – production
- Noah Goldstein – production
- Jake Miller – production (2)
- David Rodriguez – engineering, vocal production
- Chris Gehringer – mastering
- Manny Marroquin – mixing
- Claude Vause – engineering assistance
- Daniella Leon – engineering assistance
- Jack Laiheugue – engineering assistance
- Lucas Glastra – engineering assistance
- Marius Van Mierlo – engineering assistance
- Rémy Dumelz – engineering assistance

== Charts ==
Chart performance for RR
Chart (2023)	Peak position
UK Physical Singles (OCC)	16

== Release history ==
Release formats for RR
Region	Date	Format	Label	Ref.
Various	March 24, 2023	Digital download; streaming	Columbia; Duars; Sony Latin	
Various	December 15, 2023	LP	Columbia; Duars; Sony Latin	
