= LOS40 Music Awards for Best Latin Video =

Annual Spanish music award

LOS40 Music Award for Best Latin Video
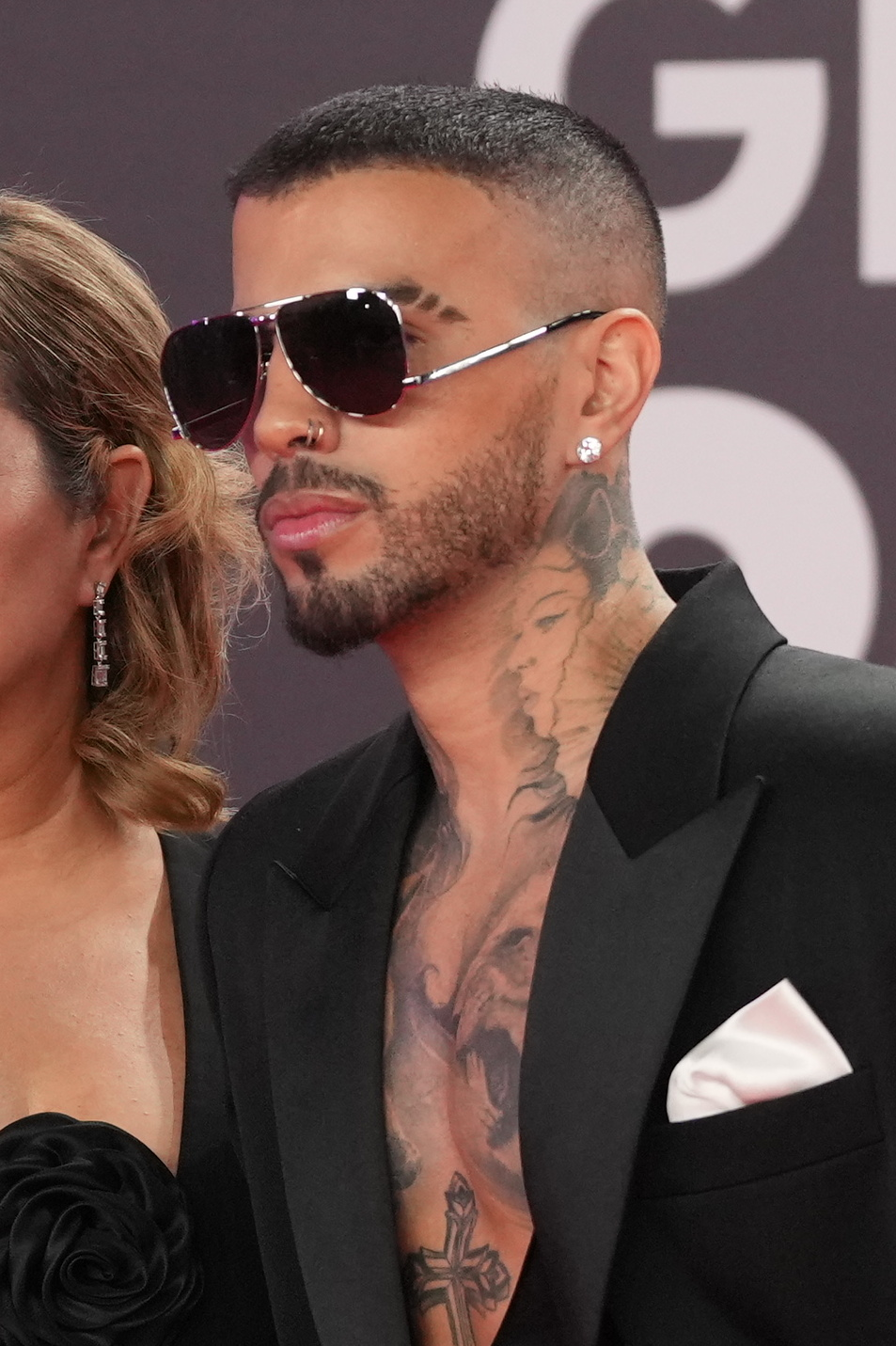
- "Carita linda" by Rauw Alejandro is the most recent recipient
- Awarded for: Best in Spanish and International music
- Country: Spain
- Presented by: Los 40
- First award: 2020
- Currently held by: "Carita linda" by Rauw Alejandro (2025)
- Website: los40.com/tag/los40_music_awards/a/

The LOS40 Music Award for Best Latin Video is an honor presented annually since 2020 by Los 40 as part of the LOS40 Music Awards, which are considered Spain's most important music awards today.

== Winners and nominees ==
Year	Artist	Work	Nominees
2020	(Colombia) / (Trinidad and Tobago) Karol G and Nicki Minaj	"Tusa"	(Colombia) J Balvin – "Rojo"; (Colombia) Maluma – "Hawái"; (Puerto Rico) Bad Bunny – "Yo Perreo Sola"; (Spain) / (United States) Rosalía and Travis Scott – "TKN"
2021	(Colombia) / (Puerto Rico) Sebastián Yatra and Myke Towers	"Pareja del Año"	(Colombia) / (Puerto Rico) Karol G, Anuel AA, and J Balvin – "Location"; (Puerto Rico) / (Spain) Bad Bunny and Rosalía – "La Noche de Anoche"; (Puerto Rico) Rauw Alejandro – "Todo de Ti"; (Colombia) / (United States) J Balvin and Skrillex – "In da Getto"
2022	(Colombia) / (Puerto Rico) Shakira & Rauw Alejandro	"Te Felicito"	(United States) / (Colombia) Becky G & Karol G – "Mamiii"; (Puerto Rico) Daddy Yankee – "Rumbatón"; (United States) Nicky Jam – "Ojos rojos"; (Colombia) Karol G – "Provenza"; (Colombia) / (Argentina) Morat & Duki – "París"
2023	(Argentina) María Becerra	"Corazón vacío"	(Argentina) / (Colombia) Bizarrap & Shakira – "Shakira: Bzrp Music Sessions, Vol. 53"; (Brazil) Anitta – "Funk Rave"; (Colombia) Manuel Turizo – "El Merengue"; (Colombia) Karol G & Shakira – "TQG"; (Colombia) Shakira & Manuel Turizo – "Copa Vacía"
2024	(Puerto Rico) Rauw Alejandro	"Touching the Sky"	(Brazil) Anitta – "Aceita"; (Colombia) Karol G – "Si Antes Te Hubiera Conocido"; (Puerto Rico) Guaynaa – "Poliamoroso"; (Puerto Rico) / (Spain) Ozuna & Bad Gyal – "Guay"; (Colombia) / (United States) Shakira & Cardi B – "Puntería"
2025	(Puerto Rico) Rauw Alejandro	"Carita linda"	(Colombia) Feid – "Se lo juro mor"; (Venezuela) / (Panama) Danny Ocean & Sech – "Priti"; (Colombia) Karol G – "Latina Foreva"; (Argentina) María Becerra & Paulo Londra – "Ramen para dos"; (Colombia) Sebastián Yatra – "La pelirroja"
