= Eydren =

Venezuelan record producer (born 1996)

- Born: Adrián Sánchez; June 20, 1996 (age 30); Caracas, Venezuela
- Genres: Reggaeton; Latin pop; EDM; hip hop
- Occupations: Music producer; songwriter
- Years active: 2013–present
- Label: Universal Music Publishing Group

Adrián Sánchez (born June 20, 1996), known as Eydren con el Ritmo or simply Eydren, is a Venezuelan music producer, songwriter and DJ who has worked in the urban genre, collaborating with artists such as Rauw Alejandro, Piso 21, Deorro, Irama, Sunmi, among many others.

He has been jointly nominated for Grammy and Latin Grammy awards, and other ceremonies as producer of Rauw Alejandro's albums.

== Musical career ==
At the age of 15, he approached production more strongly, forming Dual Color, a DJ duo focused mainly on the EDM movement in which Eydren was able to show songs such as "Make it Bounce", which came to be placed in festivals such as the Ultra Music Fest and the EDC.

In 2019, the young producer's first steps in urban music took place, working in the Venezuelan music industry, but his career took a sharp turn when he received a direct message on Instagram from Rauw Alejandro, to whom he had sent -as to Lots of other artists- different musical works trying to be heard. It was from this conversation that "Mis Días Sin ti" was born, a single that would be published at the end of the year and which would result in the internationalization of the man from Caracas under the nickname Eydren Con El Ritmo or Eydren.

During 2020, he continued to work with Rauw Alejandro, specifically the songs "Enchule" and "Dile a Él" from the Afrodisíaco project, the Puerto Rican singer's first studio album, released on November 13 of that year, which would later be nominated for the 2022 Grammy Awards in the category Best Urban Album. While this was happening, Eydren decided to leave his native country to reside in Miami, United States, seeking to give more exposure to his sound.

At the end of 2021, Eydren managed to make the leap in his career by sealing his first contract with Universal Music Group. After closing this link, the young producer worked on "Al Lau" by Lele Pons, "Cosa Guapa" by Rauw Alejandro, "Mató Mi Corazón" by Piso 21, among others.

For February 2022, the release of "Museo" takes place, a single from Rauw Alejandro's EP Trap Cake, Vol. 2, produced by Eydren. Then, in July, he participated in "PAMPAMPAMPAMPAMPAM" by Italian Irama and "Number 1" by Mexican-American DJ Deorro.

== Production credits ==
Year	Title	Artist(s)	Production	Composition
2019	"Mis Días Sin Ti"	Rauw Alejandro ft. Bryant Myers	Ya	Ya
2020	"Enchule"	Rauw Alejandro	Ya	
2020	"Dile a Él"	Rauw Alejandro	Ya	
2021	"Al Lau"	Lele Pons	Ya	Ya
2021	"VEN"	st. Pedro ft. Luar la L & Eydren	Ya	Ya
2021	"Life"	Joonti	Ya	
2021	"Como Antes"	st. Pedro	Ya	Ya
2021	"Cosa Guapa"	Rauw Alejandro	Ya	Ya
2021	"Mató Mi Corazón"	Piso 21	Ya	Ya
2022	"Museo"	Rauw Alejandro	Ya	
2022	"Mató Mi Corazón - Parte II"	Piso 21 ft. Khea & Marc Seguí	Ya	Ya
2022	"Échale"	Anthony Ramos	Ya	
2022	"Fellowship"	SUNMI	Ya	Ya
2022	"PAMPAMPAMPAMPAMPAM"	Irama	Ya	
2022	"Number 1"	Deorro ft. Dylan Fuentes	Ya	
2022	"Me Va Muy Bien"	Angela Torres	Ya	
2022	"Desacatá"	Ptazeta & L-gante	Ya	
2023	"Una Noche Sin Pensar"	Sebastian Yatra	Ya	
2023	"Villano"	Anthony Ramos	Ya	
2023	"Como Yo :("	Marshmello, Tiago PZK	Ya	
2023	"Alcohol"	Marshmello, Anuel AA	Ya	
2023	"Super High"	Marshmello, Polimá Westcoast	Ya	
2023	"Sustancias En Mi Corazón"	STRANGEHUMAN, DannyLux	Ya	Ya
2023	"VESTIDO"	STRANGEHUMAN	Ya	Ya
2024	"LUCES DE COLORES"	OMAR COURTZ	Ya	

== Awards and nominations ==
=== Grammy Awards ===
Year	Category	Nominated work	Result
2022	Best Música Urbana Album	Afrodisíaco - Rauw Alejandro	Nominees
2023	Best Música Urbana Album	Trap Cake, Vol. 2 - Rauw Alejandro	

=== Latin Grammy Awards ===
Year	Category	Nominated work	Result
2022	Best Urban Music Album	Trap Cake, Vol. 2 - Rauw Alejandro	Nominees

=== American Music Awards ===
Year	Category	Nominated work	Result
2021	Favorite Album - Latin	Afrodisíaco - Rauw Alejandro	Nominees
2022	Album of the Year	Vice Versa - Rauw Alejandro	Nominees
2022	Favorite Album - Latin	Vice Versa - Rauw Alejandro	Nominees

=== Billboard Latin Music Awards ===
Year	Category	Nominated work	Result
2023	Latin Pop Song of the Year	"Una Noche Sin Pensar" - Sebastián Yatra	Nominees

=== Premios Tu Música Urbano ===
Year	Category	Nominated work	Result
2022	Album of the Year - Male Artist	Vice Versa - Rauw Alejandro	Nominees

=== Other recognitions ===
- 2020: Lo Más Escuchado Awards - Best Latin Album | Afrodisíaco - Rauw Alejandro
- 2021: Lo Más Escuchado Awards - Best Latin Album | Vice Versa - Rauw Alejandro
- 2021: Master FM Awards - Best Latin Album of the Year | Vice Versa - Rauw Alejandro
- RIAA 6× Platinum album (Afrodisíaco - Rauw Alejandro)
- RIAA 8× Platinum album (Vice Versa - Rauw Alejandro)
- RIAA Gold single ("Pampampampampam" - Irama)
- RIAA Gold single ("Una Noche Sin Pensar" - Sebastián Yatra)
