= Enchule =

2020 single by Rauw Alejandro

Single by Rauw Alejandro

from the album Afrodisíaco
- Language: Spanish
- Released: September 17, 2020
- Genre: Reggaeton
- Length: 3:05
- Label: Sony Latin; Duars
- Songwriter: Raúl Alejandro Ocasio Ruiz "Rauw Alejandro"
- Producers: Mr. Naisgai; Eydren

Rauw Alejandro singles chronology
"En Tu Cuerpo (Remix)" (2020)	"Enchule" (2020)	"La Nota" (2020)

Music video
- "Enchule" on YouTube

"Enchule" (Puerto Rican slang for "a romantic obsession") is a song recorded by Puerto Rican singer Rauw Alejandro for his debut studio album, Afrodisíaco (2020). It was written by Alejandro, while the production was handled by Mr. Naisgai and Eydren con el Ritmo. The song was released for digital download and streaming by Sony Music Latin and Duars Entertainment on September 17, 2020, as the third single from the album. A Spanish language pop song, it was noted by the media for being different with Alejandro's usual reggaeton aesthetic, and is a love song, in which he expresses the feelings of the person on the stage where he know he has fallen in love.

"Enchule" received positive reviews from music critics, who complimented the singer's vocals. The track was nominated for La Coreo Más Hot at the 2021 Premios Juventud. It was commercially successful in Spain, reaching the top 10 in the country and being certified platinum. An accompanying music video, released simultaneously with the song, was directed by Gustavo "Gus" Camacho. It depicts Alejandro traveling to different parts of the world in the search of love. He is shown dancing in Tokyo streets, in front of the Eiffel Tower, near the Egyptian pyramids, and up in the clouds. His choreography was praised by the critics and the video was nominated for Best Latin Video Choreography at the 2020 Latin Music Official Italian Awards.

== Background and release ==
In January 2020, Rauw Alejandro revealed the titles of four of his upcoming songs, including "Enchule". He explained that the song's title refers to "when you like something or someone to levels that only you think about it". In February 2020, he announced that he was working on his debut studio album Afrodisíaco. "Enchule" was released for digital download and streaming by Sony Music Latin and Duars Entertainment as the third single from Afrodisíaco on September 17, 2020. It was included as the fifth track on the album, released November 13, 2020. During an interview with Remezcla, he described the track as his "favorite song", stating that he "enjoyed this one so much".

== Music and lyrics ==
"Enchule"
An 18-second sample of the chorus

Musically, "Enchule", which was noted by the media for being different with Alejandro's usual reggaeton aesthetic, is a Spanish language pop song, with elements of R&B and trap. It was written by Alejandro and produced by Mr. Naisgai and Eydren con el Ritmo. The track runs for a total of three minutes and five seconds. Lyrically, "Enchule" is a love song, in which Alejandro expresses the feelings of the person on the stage where he know he has fallen in love. The word "Enchule" is a Puerto Rican slang for a romantic obsession.

== Reception ==
=== Critical ===
Upon release, "Enchule" was met with positive reviews from music critics. Remezcla's Lucas Villa called Alejandro's voice "hypnotic" and described the song as "alluring". In 2022, Ernesto Lechner from Rolling Stone ranked the track as Alejandro's 12th-best song.

The track was nominated for La Coreo Más Hot at the 2021 Premios Juventud.

=== Commercial ===
In Spain, "Enchule" debuted at number 43 on September 27, 2020. It subsequently peaked at number 10 on the chart issue dated November 1, 2020, becoming Alejandro's fifth top 10 hit in the country. The track was later certified platinum by the Productores de Música de España (PROMUSICAE), for track-equivalent sales of over 40,000 units in the country. In Latin America, the song experienced moderate chart success. It peaked at number 4 in Dominican Republic, number 21 in Paraguay, number 47 in Peru, and number 66 in Argentina. The song was also certified double platinum by the Asociación Mexicana de Productores de Fonogramas y Videogramas (AMPROFON), for track-equivalent sales of over 120,000 units in Mexico.

== Promotion ==
=== Music video ===
A screenshot from the music video, depicting Alejandro and his dancers dancing in front of the Egyptian pyramids.

An accompanying music video was released simultaneously with the song. The visual was directed by Venezuelan director Gustavo "Gus" Camacho, who had also directed the videos for Alejandro's previous singles "Fantasías", "Fantasías (Remix)", "Elegí", "Tattoo (Remix)", and "Elegí (Remix)". It depicts Alejandro traveling to different parts of the world in the search of love. He is shown dancing in Tokyo streets, in front of the Eiffel Tower, near the Egyptian pyramids, and up in the clouds. Remezcla's Lucas Villa gave the "dance-heavy" video a positive review, calling it "cute", while labeling Alejandro "a straight choreo killer". Happy FM staff described the video as "incredible", while MTV News staff called it "magical". The visual was nominated for Best Latin Video Choreography at the 2020 Latin Music Official Italian Awards.

=== Live performances ===
"Enchule" was included on the set lists for Alejandro's the Rauw Alejandro World Tour and the Vice Versa Tour.

== Track listing ==
Digital download / streaming
No.	Title	Length
1.	"Enchule"	3:05

== Credits and personnel ==
Credits adapted from Tidal.

- Rauw Alejandro – associated performer, composer, lyricist
- Mr. Naisgai – producer
- Eydren con el Ritmo – producer

== Charts ==
=== Weekly charts ===
Weekly chart performance for "Enchule"
Chart (2020–2021)	Peak position
Argentina Hot 100 (Billboard)	66
Dominican Republic (Monitor Latino)	4
Global Excl. US (Billboard)	163
Paraguay Urbano (Monitor Latino)	17
Peru Streaming (UNIMPRO)	47
Spain (Promusicae)	10

=== Monthly charts ===
Monthly chart position for "Enchule"
Chart (2020)	Peak position
Paraguay (SGP)	21

== Certifications ==
Certifications and sales for "Enchule"
Region	Certification	Certified units/sales
Colombia	2× Platinum	
Mexico (AMPROFON)	3× Platinum	180,000^{‡}
Spain (Promusicae)	Platinum	40,000^{‡}
Streaming
Central America (CFC)	Platinum	7,000,000^{†}
^{‡} Sales+streaming figures based on certification alone.^{†} Streaming-only figures based on certification alone.

== Release history ==
Release dates and formats for "Enchule"
Region	Date	Format	Label	Ref(s)
Various	September 17, 2020	Digital download; streaming	Sony Music Latin; Duars Entertainment	
Latin America	September 18, 2020	Contemporary hit radio	Sony Music Latin; Duars Entertainment	
Italy	October 23, 2020	Contemporary hit radio	Sony Music Latin; Duars Entertainment	
