= KLK (song) =

2020 single by Arca featuring Rosalía

Single by Arca featuring Rosalía

from the album Kick I
- Language: Spanish
- B-side: "KLK" (instrumental)
- Released: 22 June 2020
- Recorded: September–December 2018
- Genre: Deconstructed club; reggaeton
- Length: 3:47
- Label: XL; Columbia
- Songwriters: Alejandra Ghersi; Rosalía; Luis Garban
- Producers: Arca; Cardopusher

Arca singles chronology
"Mequetrefe" (2020)	"KLK" (2020)	"Knot" (2020)

Rosalía singles chronology
"TKN" (2020)	"KLK" (2020)	"Relación (remix)" (2020)

Audio sample
- file; help

"KLK" (abbreviation of "qué lo qué", a colloquial expression for "what's up?") is a song recorded by Venezuelan musician Arca featuring vocals by Spanish singer Rosalía. Written by both of the performers in Barcelona, Spain, the track was released on 22 June 2020 through XL Recordings and Columbia Records as the fourth single off Arca's fourth studio album Kick I.

In December 2021, a remixed version featuring Ivy Queen and La Goony Chonga premiered exclusively on Motomami Los Santos, Rosalía's own Grand Theft Auto V radio station hosted by her and Arca.

== Background ==
Arca and Rosalía have been friends since 2018. Their friendship started when Arca discovered the Spanish singer through her hit single "Malamente" and saw her set at the Sónar music festival. In April 2019, during an Instagram livestream, Arca teased a song titled "KLK" and stated "I can't wait to put this record out". The couple of friends were seen in public again at Frank Ocean's PrEP+ Party in New York City, where the Venezuelan played a special DJ set. In November 2019, Rosalía sampled Arca's voice as an interlude to transition from "A Palé" to "Con altura" during her performance at the 20th Annual Latin Grammy Awards.

On 8 March 2020, Arca revealed to Garage Magazine that her new album would be released in 2020 and that would feature collaborations with Björk and Rosalía among others, confirming the participation of the Spanish new flamenco artist in her fourth studio album. On 21 June, Arca and Rosalía had a conversation on an Instagram livestream where they discussed the track and previewed it. Without any previous announcement, "KLK" was released on digital download and different streaming platforms the day after, along with its instrumental version.

== Composition ==
The track was first recorded in Barcelona on 17 September 2018 and was lyric empty. Since Rosalía was promoting her second studio album El mal querer (2018) in Madrid and Miami, her vocals were sent to Arca through a WhatsApp voice note. Thus, the song has partly been recorded using an iPhone. "KLK" was also produced by Venezuelan musician and Arca's high school friend Luis Garban, who records under the stage name Cardopusher.

Inspired by traditional Venezuelan music and utilising a drum known as the furruco, Arca has stated that she was grateful to have "studied some of the typical styles of Venezuelan music," thus noting that she had always thought of the drum when she would "program a subbass".

== Critical reception ==
"KLK" was generally well received by critics. Writing for Exclaim!, Kaelen Bell found the track to be "in a state of constant collapse and regeneration" and a form of "caustic reggaeton", while Dhruva Balram of NME referred to it as "hyperkinetic" and a "club-ready track." Pitchfork's Chal Ravens praised the "extra ballast" Cardopusher added to the song's production, whereas The Guardian's John Twells found that Rosalía's feature on the track added "little to the mix other than a Spanish voice in a reggaetónera’s clothing," negatively comparing it to the other collaborations on Kick I.

== Credits and personnel ==
Credits adapted from Tidal.

- Alejandra Ghersi – producer, composer
- Rosalía – lyricist
- Cardopusher – producer, composer
- Alex Epton – mixer, studio personnel

== Track listing ==
- Digital download – streaming
1. "KLK" – 3:47
2. "KLK" (instrumental) – 3:47

== Release history ==
Country	Date	Format	Label
Various	22 June 2020	Digital download; streaming	XL Recordings
