= Linda (Tokischa and Rosalía song) =

Single by Tokischa and Rosalía
- Language: Spanish
- English title: "Pretty"
- Released: 1 September 2021
- Recorded: 1 August 2021
- Studio: Desalmado (Santo Domingo)
- Genre: Dembow
- Length: 2:24
- Label: Sony Latin
- Songwriters: Tokischa Altagracia Peralta; Rosalia Vila Tobella; Leonardo Felipe Yasmil; Raymi Miguel Paulus Torres
- Producers: Leo RD; Rosalía

Tokischa singles chronology
"Perra" (2021)	"Linda" (2021)	"Yo Lo Daño" (2021)

Rosalía singles chronology
"La Noche de Anoche" (2021)	"Linda" (2021)	"La Fama" (2021)

Music video
- "Linda" on YouTube

"Linda" (transl. "Pretty") is a song recorded by Dominican rapper Tokischa and Spanish singer-songwriter Rosalía. Written by both performers alongside Leonardo Felipe Yasmil and El Kagueto del Guetto, and produced by Leo RD alongside Rosalía, the track was released to digital download and streaming platforms on 1 September 2021 through Sony Music Latin. Recorded in just an afternoon, "Linda" is a dembow track that interpolates flamenco music.

== Background ==
On July 25, Rosalía revealed that she would travel to the Dominican Republic "very soon". A week later, the singer made headlines after landing on the island as she was interacting with a lot of local people on the streets of the country's capital city, Santo Domingo. News about a possible collaboration with local rapper Tokischa came right through. On 9 August record producer Leo RD made an exclusive interview with Alofoke Radio Show, where he revealed that they had, indeed, recorded a song together. He also confirmed that the track was "thought-out in an hour" and "fully recorded in, perhaps, three hours", being the whole track "improvised". Arrangements and secondary production details where completed later that week.

The track was teased a couple times by both artists before its release. First, a snippet of its music video leaked online on 12 August. Then, three days later, Rosalía included a very short video of the shooting on TikTok. A week later, the title was confirmed by the performers on Twitter and, on 25 August, Rosalía posted another TikTok; this time, with a 16-second tease of the studio version of the song. A final snippet of the song featured a teaser of the music video, and was officially posted on social media the day after with the caption "soon". Pre-save for the song was made available on 31 August, as the cover art and release date were parallelly revealed.

== Reception ==
After uploading the first teaser of the song on social media, online backlash started to appear for Rosalía collaborating with a Latino artist, which is something the singer has been facing since the beginning of her career. Large amounts of people online constantly remind her that she is "not Latina" or is "Latina fishing". The controversy reached American rapper Cardi B, who is of direct Dominican descent. She responded to the following tweet "the gatekeeping woke activist latinos already hating in the comments. Y’all are so fucking irritating. We just wanna hear the music and shake ass. Go away!" and made the following statement: "and its soo annoying because Rosalia is a huge mainstream artist collabing with a small artist from DR. It's hard to go mainstream if you from DR this is huge for Tokischa and can take her far. There's only 2 big reggaeton mainstream artists from DR Alfa & Natti". After being reminded that "Rosalía ain't Latina", the rapper continued defending the Spanish singer by writing "And a lot of Latino artists ain't supporting or giving the push to Dominican artists so what's your point?".

At the end of 2021, "Linda" was listed as one of the best songs of the year by many publications including Billboard, Pitchfork, Harper's Bazaar, Dazed and The Fader.

== Commercial performance ==
"Linda" had a moderate success upon release, debting at number 34 on the US Billboard Hot Latin Songs. During the first month since release day, the song received an average of 500,000 daily worldwide streams on Spotify. After about five different TikTok dancing trends involving the song and a televised performance at the 2021 Billboard Latin Music Awards, "Linda" entered the Global 200 list on Spotify with 848,347 streams in a single day, debuting at 156.

== Music video ==
The music video for "Linda" was recorded in early August in the Santo Domingo districts of Los Guandules and San Carlos and features guest appearances by Dominican merengue accordionist and singer Fefita la Grande and social media personality Mami Jordan. It was directed by Raymi Paulus, who also took part in the composition and songwriting process.

== Live performance ==
Tokischa and Rosalía gave the first performance of the song on TV at the 2021 Billboard Latin Music Awards.

== Personnel ==
Adapted from TIDAL.

Production

- Rosalía – production, composition, songwriting; vocals
- Leonardo Felipe Yasmil "Leo RD" – production, composition, songwriting
- Tokischa – composition, songwriting; vocals
- Raymi Miguel Paulus Torres – composition, songwriting

Technical

- Chris Gehringer – mastering engineer
- Andrew Dawson – mixing engineer
- Leonardo Felipe Yasmil "Leo RD" – recording engineer

== Charts ==
Chart (2021)	Peak position
Dominican Republic (Monitor Latino)	8
Paraguay (SGP)	24
Peru (Monitor Latino)	56
Spain (PROMUSICAE)	22
US Billboard Hot Latin Songs	34

== Certifications ==
Region	Certification	Certified units/sales
Mexico (AMPROFON)	Gold	70,000^{‡}
Spain (Promusicae)	Platinum	40,000^{‡}
United States (RIAA)	2× Platinum (Latin)	120,000^{‡}
^{‡} Sales+streaming figures based on certification alone.

== Release history ==
Country	Date	Format	Label
Various	September 1, 2021	Digital download; streaming	Sony Latin
Spain	September 5, 2021	Contemporary hit radio	Sony Latin
Dominican Republic	September 21, 2021	Contemporary hit radio	Sony Latin
