= LLYLM =

2023 single by Rosalía

Single by Rosalía
- Language: Spanish; English
- Released: 27 January 2023
- Genre: Flamenco pop
- Length: 2:54
- Label: Columbia
- Songwriters: Rosalia Vila; Daniel Aged; David Rodríguez; Dylan Wiggins; Noah Goldstein; Karl Schuster
- Producers: Rosalía; Noah Goldstein; David Rodríguez; Dylan Patrice; Shellback

Rosalía singles chronology
"Besos Moja2" (2022)	"LLYLM" (2023)	"Beso" (2023)

Lyric video
- "LLYLM" on YouTube

"LLYLM" (an acronym for "Lie Like You Love Me") is a song by Spanish singer Rosalía. It was released on 27 January 2023 by Columbia Records. The flamenco pop song contains handclaps, guitars, synthesizers, and a chorus sung in English. "LLYLM" was used to promote a limited edition drink made in collaboration between Rosalía and Coca-Cola.

== Background and composition ==
The singer started teasing "LLYLM" in early January 2023, while vacationing in Tokyo with her then-boyfriend Rauw Alejandro. On 18 January, Rosalía revealed the release date for the song. She kept releasing TikTok clips with snippets of the song leading up to the release. On 23 January, she posted the cover of the single. In it Rosalía wears bubblegum pink boots, designed by Spanish fashion brand Abra.

"LLYLM" was described as a flamenco pop song with influences from pop, R&B, and electronic music. Marysabel Huston-Crespo, writing for CNN en Español, said that while the "LLYLM" is "closer to English-language pop", Rosalía keep her flamenco roots with the heavy use of handclaps throughout the song. Lyrically, the song is about an unrequited love in which a woman asks a man to love her reciprocally. The first verse begins as a tongue twister; "El que quiero, no me quiere / Como quiero que me quiera", with Rosalía singing over a handclap beat. For the chorus, she switches to English while using falsetto and instrumentation provided by guitar and synthesizers; "I don't need honesty / Baby, lie like you love me, lie like you love me".

== Promotion ==
"LLYLM" was used to promote Rosalía's collaboration with Coca-Cola, in which they created a limited edition brand called 'Move'. The drink included a QR code that gives access to behind-the-scenes of the song's creation. A short film inspired by the brand was released on 10 February 2023.

== Critical reception ==
Charlotte Krol of Rolling Stone UK described "LLYLM" as a "peppy, lovelorn track" while NME's Will Richards said it was "bright and poppy".

== Charts ==
=== Weekly charts ===
Weekly chart performance for "LLYLM"
Chart (2023)	Peak position
Belgium (Ultratop 50 Wallonia)	12
Brazil Latin Airplay (Crowley Charts)	1
France (SNEP)	34
Global 200 (Billboard)	66
Greece (IFPI)	87
Italy (FIMI)	74
Netherlands (Single Tip)	12
New Zealand Hot Singles (RMNZ)	31
Portugal (AFP)	48
San Marino (SMRRTV Top 50)	11
Spain (PROMUSICAE)	4
Sweden Heatseeker (Sverigetopplistan)	19
Switzerland (Schweizer Hitparade)	32
US Hot Latin Songs (Billboard)	22

=== Year-end charts ===
Year-end chart performance for "LLYLM"
Chart (2023)	Position
Belgium (Ultratop 50 Wallonia)	36

== Certifications ==
Certifications for "LLYLM"
Region	Certification	Certified units/sales
Brazil (Pro-Música Brasil)	Gold	20,000^{‡}
France (SNEP)	Platinum	200,000^{‡}
Italy (FIMI)	Gold	50,000^{‡}
Spain (PROMUSICAE)	2× Platinum	120,000^{‡}
^{‡} Sales+streaming figures based on certification alone.
