= Dile a Él =

2021 single by Rauw Alejandro

Single by Rauw Alejandro

from the album Afrodisíaco
- Language: Spanish
- English title: "Tell Him"
- Released: February 3, 2021
- Genre: Reggaeton
- Length: 3:29
- Label: Sony Latin; Duars
- Songwriter: Raúl Alejandro Ocasio Ruiz "Rauw Alejandro"
- Producers: Eydren; El Zorro; Rosalía; Caleb Calloway

Rauw Alejandro singles chronology
"Baila Conmigo" (2021)	"Dile a Él" (2021)	"2/Catorce" (2021)

Music video
- "Dile a Él" on YouTube

"Dile a Él" (transl. "Tell Him") is a song recorded by Puerto Rican singer Rauw Alejandro for his debut studio album, Afrodisíaco (2020), featuring uncredited background vocals from Spanish singer Rosalía. It was written by Alejandro, while the production was handled by Eydren con el Ritmo, Alejandro, Rosalía, and Caleb Calloway. The song was released by Sony Music Latin and Duars Entertainment on February 3, 2021, as the sixth single from the album. A Spanish language mid-tempo "dark" reggaeton ballad, it addresses the singer's ex-girlfriend who has broken up with him to be with another man.

"Dile a Él" received positive reviews from music critics, who described it as "one of the most spectacular songs" in the album. The track peaked at number 38 on the US Billboard Hot Latin Songs chart. An accompanying music video, released simultaneously with the song, was filmed in Miami, and directed by Alfred Marroquín. It depicts Alejandro lost, remorseful and crestfallen for not having the chance to share his life with the person he loves. The song was included on the set lists for Alejandro's the Rauw Alejandro World Tour and the Vice Versa Tour.

== Background and release ==
I love all my songs, but a really special song is the first track on the album. It's inspired by old reggaetón. [...] I put my R&B tunes on. Then I started working with Rosalía on this track. We created an amazing ending. I'm very happy and excited for people to hear that combination. It's an amazing song: it takes you through a great experience.

— Rauw Alejandro on "Dile a Él".

In February 2020, Rauw Alejandro announced that he was working on his debut studio album Afrodisíaco. On November 9, 2020, he revealed the album's track list, including "Dile a Él" as the first track. The album was released for digital download and streaming by Sony Music Latin and Duars Entertainment on November 13, 2020. On February 3, 2021, the track was released as the sixth single from the album.

The song features uncredited background vocals by Spanish singer Rosalía. During an interview with Rolling Stone, Alejandro talked about working with her: "I wanted [the song] to have an outro that was completely the opposite — more angelic and lighter. I had a chance to work with Rosalia, who came in and did her thing and went into the production side. In the end, it was such a great team and a great song." While there were already rumors of a romantic relationship between the singers, the rumors intensified following this collaboration. The two made their relationship as a couple official in September 2021, and Alejandro later admitted that they "were together" at the time they were working on the song.

== Music and lyrics ==
"Dile a Él"
A 20-second sample of the chorus, which features a mid-tempo melody.

Musically, "Dile a Él" is a Spanish language mid-tempo "dark" reggaeton ballad, with a down-tempo "slightly darker" outro. It was written by Alejandro and produced by Eydren con el Ritmo, Alejandro, Rosalía, and Caleb Calloway. The track runs for a total of 3 minutes and 29 seconds. Lyrically, "Dile a Él" which translates to "Tell Him" in English, addresses the singer's ex-girlfriend who has broken up with him to be with another man. During an interview with People, Alejandro explained the song's lyrics: "It's about breakup and jealousy. The guy can't get over his past love and he's mad because she's with another man. He's expressing all of his feelings of hate and rancor and at the end he realizes that he needs to let her go and be happy." He confirmed that it is "not 100%" inspired by his own experience. The lyrics include, "Todo esto a la mala tuve que aprender / El cenicero lleno, lo que hago es prender / Y todavía no olvido nada / Te he llora'o en mi almohada" (I had to learn all this the hard way / The ashtray is full, what I do is turn it on / And I still haven't forgotten anything / I've cried you on my pillow).

== Critical reception ==
"Dile a Él" has been met with widely positive reviews from music critics. Okdiario staff labeled the track "one of the most spectacular songs" included in Afrodisíaco, while Los 40's Ignacio Videla described it as "one of the hits" from the album. Julyssa Lopez from Rolling Stone, ranked the song among Alejandro's 10 Essential Songs, stating that it "signaled that Rauw was veering from the sensual R&B he'd set out to make and embracing the reggaeton roots he grew up on". Also from Rolling Stone, Ernesto Lechner ranked it as the singer's 17th-best song in 2022, called its beat "crisp" and "as compact and tight as reggaetón can be", and praised Rosalía's "angelic voice" in the song.

== Commercial performance ==
Following the release of Afrodisíaco, "Dile a Él" debuted and peaked at number 59 in Spain on November 22, 2020, as an album track. It was later certified platinum by the Productores de Música de España (PROMUSICAE), for track-equivalent sales of over 60,000 units in the country. The song debuted at number 42 on the US Billboard Hot Latin Songs chart on August 7, 2021, becoming Alejandro's 22nd entry. On August 28, 2021, the track reached its peak of number 38. It also peaked at numbers 31 and 18 on the Latin Airplay and Latin Rhythm Airplay charts, respectively. In Latin America, "Dile a Él" peaked at number 49 on the Argentina Hot 100 and was certified platinum in Colombia.

== Promotion ==
=== Music video ===
A screenshot from the black and white music video.

On December 13, 2020, Alejandro announced the fulfillment of the production of an accompanying music video on Twitter. On February 2, 2021, he shared a teaser of the video, announcing that it would be released "soon". The visual, directed by Alfred Marroquín, was released the following day. It was filmed in Miami and depicts Alejandro lost, remorseful and crestfallen for not having the chance to share his life with the person he loves. With some dark shots in color and in black and white, Alejandro is seen "carried away" by the music in several scenes.

=== Live performances ===
"Dile a Él" was included on the set lists for Alejandro's the Rauw Alejandro World Tour and the Vice Versa Tour.

== Credits and personnel ==
Credits adapted from Tidal.

- Rauw Alejandro – associated performer, composer, lyricist, producer
- Eydren con el Ritmo – producer
- Rosalía – producer
- Caleb Calloway – producer
- José M. Collazo "Colla" – mastering engineer, mixing engineer
- Jorge E. Pizarro "Kenobi" – recording engineer
- Eric Pérez Rovira "Eric Duars" – executive producer
- Amber Rubi Urena – A&R coordinator
- John Eddie Pérez – A&R director

== Charts ==
Weekly chart performance for "Dile a Él"
Chart (2020–2024)	Peak position
Argentina Hot 100 (Billboard)	49
Spain (Promusicae)	59
US Hot Latin Songs (Billboard)	38
US Latin Airplay (Billboard)	31
US Latin Rhythm Airplay (Billboard)	18

== Certifications ==
Certifications and sales for "Dile a Él"
Region	Certification	Certified units/sales
Colombia	Platinum	
Mexico (AMPROFON)	4× Platinum	560,000^{‡}
Spain (Promusicae)	2× Platinum	200,000^{‡}
^{‡} Sales+streaming figures based on certification alone.
