= TKN (song) =

2020 single by Rosalía and Travis Scott

Single by Rosalía and Travis Scott
- Language: Spanish; English
- Released: May 28, 2020
- Recorded: February 2019
- Studio: Homemade studio in Hollywood Hills; Conway Recording, Los Angeles
- Genre: Alternative reggaeton; gangsta rap; trap
- Length: 2:09
- Label: Columbia
- Songwriters: Rosalía Vila; Jacques Webster II; Alejandro Ramírez; Nelson Martinez; Marcos Masís; Pablo Díaz-Reixa
- Producers: Rosalía; El Guincho; Sky Rompiendo; Tainy; Teo Halm

Rosalía singles chronology
"Juro Que" (2020)	"TKN" (2020)	"KLK" (2020)

Travis Scott singles chronology
"The Scotts" (2020)	"TKN" (2020)	"Wash Us in the Blood" (2020)

Music video
- "TKN" on YouTube

"TKN" is a song by Spanish singer Rosalía and American rapper Travis Scott. Produced by Rosalía, El Guincho, Sky Rompiendo el Bajo, Tainy and Teo Halm, the song was released on May 28, 2020, by Columbia Records. This marks the second collaboration between the performers, the first one being a remix of Scott's "Highest in the Room". The song reached number one in Spain and Colombia, as well as the top ten in Panama, Costa Rica, Portugal, Switzerland, Czech Republic and Argentina. Its music video, directed by Canada, was awarded a Latin Grammy for Best Short Form Music Video and a Premio Lo Nuestro for Video of the Year, among others.

== Background ==
In March 2020, during the international lockdown caused by the COVID-19 pandemic, Rosalía appeared on several radio stations and TV shows to promote her new work, a promotional single titled "Dolerme"; she told El Hormiguero that she had released that track in substitution of a "very aggressive track that featured an American artist which was meant to be released that month but that didn't match the whole situation". In April, Rosalía told Zane Lowe on Beats 1 that the collaborator was Travis Scott, who she personally met through Kylie Jenner in the summer of 2019 and then performed at his Astroworld Festival in Houston in November. She stated that "this song is so aggressive, it has like an energy that I think that is so specific for a certain moment. It is really meant to be played in a club".

On May 22, Rosalía shared a 30-second clip on Instagram stories of her in Miami listening to the song on her phone. The clip showed Scott rapping in Spanish for the first time in his career. Three days later, she officially announced the name of the track as well as its respective cover art. On May 27, Rosalía changed the picture of her selfmade Spotify playlist 'La Rosalía' with one that was taken during the filming of the music video. Later, she shared a preview of the song and the music video on social media.

== Composition and lyrics ==
"TKN" was first written by Rosalía in a homemade studio in Hollywood Hills in January 2019 as a solo project. However, the track was re-recorded at the Conway Recording Studios in Los Angeles in February and turned into a duet. The track is two minutes and nine seconds long, one of the shortest songs in both artists' repertoire. The track was written by DJ Nelson, Pablo Díaz-Reixa and the performers themselves and produced mainly by Rosalía and El Guincho, with help by Sky Rompiendo el Bajo, Tainy and Teo Halm. In July 2021, it was revealed that Puerto Rican singer Lunay was scheduled to collaborate on the track before Scott jumped on it.

The track is a conceptual song centered around a gangster family formed by the two performers, Rosalía and Travis Scott. The song sees Scott being murdered in a gang war between drug networks, while Rosalía becomes a widow who still dresses in black in order to express mourning. According to XXL's Trent Fitzgerald "The gang could either be Italian or Brazilian due to the uncountable Sicilian references, from 'capo' to 'omertà' and for the use of the word 'brazuca', which references someone originary from Brazil". Rosalía sings about how she cannot trust anyone anymore, while Scott's lyrics contains "a conversation with and about the woman of his life, his wife, and how she had nothing to do with this business, that he assumes all the responsibility". Rosalía, the mother and wife, constantly talks about not breaking the 'omertà' a.k.a. the Sicilian law of silence, which forbids talking about any criminal act or crime. The track also references Argentinian film director Gaspar Noé, whose films usually are about drugs, gangs, crime and sects; and a woman dressed in black named "Kika" which references the role played by Verónica Forqué on the 1993 Pedro Almodóvar film Kika.

On release day, Rosalía told Spotify's "Baila Reggaeton" that she got inspired by the "squads" and "clans" some artists have. She stated that the song is based in the most pure and classical reggaeton. Production took a lot of time to develop and perfect, almost a year.

== Critical reception ==
Sheldon Pearce wrote for Pitchfork: "In 'TKN' they sing in unison, meet on neutral ground, and disavow all potential interlopers. It's a vibrant cross-cultural exchange that proves that relying on new friends can be constructive". Vulture's Justin Curto stated that: "The world is changing all around us, but some things remain constant, among them Rosalía's ability to release a total club banger every few months". Music portal Vinilo Negro wrote: "'TKN' brings back the best Rosalía in just 2 minutes, with an impeccable Travis Scott".

== Commercial performance ==
"TKN" debuted at the eighth position on the Spotify Global Chart with 3.4 million streams in over a day, marking the second time Rosalía enters the chart. The track became a top ten iTunes hit in Spain and Latin America while the music video became the most trendy in many European and American countries, including the United States. For over two consecutive weeks, the track received an average of two million daily streams on Spotify. Due to this release, Rosalía went from ten million monthly listeners on the platform to over 21 million, reaching 20 million again since September 2019, becoming one of the 100 most listened singers on the streaming platform for the first time ever.

The song peaked on the Billboard Hot 100 at number 66, becoming her first chart entry and the first time a Spanish female solo act does since Rocío Jurado in 1985. It also reached the second position on the US Hot Latin Song chart. "TKN" became a top 10 hit in Switzerland, New Zealand and Portugal, while reaching the top position in Spain, marking Rosalía's sixth number one single in her home country and Scott's first one there. On June 27 the track reached 100 million combined streams, combining YouTube and Spotify. Later, on July 18, the track reached 100 million streams exclusively on Spotify.

In late June the song became very popular on TikTok thanks to a series of dance videos posted by media personalities Charli D'Amelio and Maddie Ziegler among others. The viral choreography, marked by movements of the waist and hips, was created by Retroconverse. Starting with D'Amelio's post on June 27, the audio became trending on the app. The audio went from 40,000 uses to 500,000 in a single week. Spotify streams in this period of time went from 1,5 million daily streams to over 2 million. This trend helped the track reach the top spots in the ITunes charts in Portugal and Czech Republic despite being released for over a month. The audio reached a million uses on TikTok on July 12.

Despite being released four month before, "TKN" still managed to enter the new Billboard Global 200 chart and the Global Excl. US, which were launched in September 2020.

== Music video ==
The music video for "TKN" was filmed in Los Angeles between February 15 and 17, 2020. As revealed to Barcelonian radio station RAC 1, the video was produced by Catalan production company CANADA, who also took part in the production of Rosalía's Billboard x Honda 3-episode documentary and in some of her earlier songs like "Malamente" and "Pienso en tu Mirá". During her interview with Zane Lowe on Beats 1 in April, Rosalía confirmed that the music video was already finished. It premiered on YouTube on May 28 and scored a win for Best Short Form Music Video at the 2020 Latin Grammy Awards. It also won the Premio Lo Nuestro for Video of the Year and was nominated for a Los40 Music Award for Best Latin Video.

=== Synopsis ===
Directed by Nicolás Méndez and produced by CANADA alongside The Directors Bureau, it shows Rosalía with over thirty kids running through North Hollywood, Pomona and inside a house in South Los Angeles wearing outfits designed by Alexander Wang. These children portray the sons and daughters of Rosalía and Travis Scott, who died in a shooting and whose body was discovered by the police sometime after. Rosalía portrays a widow and a single mother. Paintings on the house's walls reflect the storyline. They show people with guns in their hands, three people holding burning torches and a dead bird, among others. A dead white dove also appears in the video. It falls to the ground and attracts the kids, who poke it with a stick The music video ends with Rosalía hugging one of the children. Mariah Tavares child being held. The video's choreography was designed by Charm La'Donna.

== Remix ==
On June 26, 2020, Venezuelan musician Arca played a special DJ set on BBC Radio 1 Dance to celebrate the release of her fourth studio album KiCk i. The musician played multiple tracks off it as well as "KLK", her collaboration with Rosalía and remixed the Spanish singer's track "TKN", which was moderately-well received by the public. The "TKN" remix includes distortionated voices, spaceship sounds and traffic noise effects among others.

== Awards and nominations ==
Year	Award	Category	Result
2020	Latin Grammy Awards	Best Short Form Music Video	Won
2020	Los40 Music Awards	Best Latin Video	Nominated
2020	MVPA Awards	Best Pop Video	Nominated
2020	MVPA Awards	Best Choreography	Nominated
2020	UK Music Video Awards	Best Pop Video - International	Nominated
2021	ADG Laus Awards	Best Audiovisual	Won
2021	ADG Laus Awards	Best Lettering in a Music Video	Won
2021	D&AD Awards	Best Direction	Won
2021	Latin American Music Awards	Favorite Video	Nominated
2021	Italian Latin Music Awards	Best Latin Song	Nominated
2021	Italian Latin Music Awards	Best Spanglish Song	Nominated
2021	Italian Latin Music Awards	Best Latin Collaboration	Nominated
2021	Italian Latin Music Awards	Best Latin Female Video	Won
2021	Italian Latin Music Awards	Best Latin Video Choreography	Won
2021	Premios Juventud	OMG Collaboration	Nominated
2021	Premio Lo Nuestro	Crossover Collaboration of the Year	Nominated
2021	Premio Lo Nuestro	Video of the Year	Won
2021	Premios Odeón	Best Music Video	Nominated

== Personnel ==
Credits adapted from Tidal.

- Recording and production
- Rosalía Vila – vocals, songwriting, production, arrangement
- Travis Scott – vocals, songwriting, production
- Pablo Díaz-Reixa – production, songwriting, arrangement, recording engineering
- Alejandro Ramírez – composer, production
- DJ Nelson – composer
- Marco Masís – composer, production
- Teo Halm – production
- José David Acedo Morales – arrangement
- Robin Florent – assistant engineering
- Jeremie Inhaber – assistant engineering
- Scott Desmarais – assistant engineering
- Sean Solymar – assistant engineering
- Emerson Mancini – master engineering
- Mike Dean – mixing engineering
- Chris Galland – mixing engineering
- Manny Marroquin – mixing engineering
- David Rodríguez – recording engineering

== Charts ==
=== Weekly charts ===
Chart (2020)	Peak position
Argentina Hot 100 (Billboard)	7
Austria (Ö3 Austria Top 40)	31
Belgium (Ultratip Bubbling Under Flanders)	3
Belgium (Ultratip Bubbling Under Wallonia)	12
Canada Hot 100 (Billboard)	57
Colombia (National-Report)	1
Costa Rica (National-Report)	14
Czech Republic Singles Digital (ČNS IFPI)	8
El Salvador (Monitor Latino)	3
France (SNEP)	52
Germany (GfK)	43
Global 200 (Billboard)	126
Greece International (IFPI Greece)	2
Hungary (Single Top 40)	38
Hungary (Stream Top 40)	35
Ireland (IRMA)	43
Italy (FIMI)	16
Mexico (Billboard Mexican Airplay)	17
Mexico (Billboard Mexican Espanol Airplay)	9
Netherlands (Dutch Tipparade 40)	1
Netherlands (Single Top 100)	20
New Zealand Hot Singles (RMNZ)	8
Panama (Monitor Latino)	3
Portugal (AFP)	2
Puerto Rico (National-Report)	12
Romania (Airplay 100)	98
Slovakia Singles Digital (ČNS IFPI)	34
Spain (Promusicae)	1
Spain (Digital Song Sales)	10
Sweden (Sverigetopplistan)	86
Switzerland (Schweizer Hitparade)	6
UK Singles (OCC)	41
US Billboard Hot 100	66
US Hot Latin Songs (Billboard)	2
US Latin Airplay (Billboard)	25

=== Year-end charts ===
Chart (2020)	Position
Spain (PROMUSICAE)	69
Switzerland (Schweizer Hitparade)	67
US Hot Latin Songs (Billboard)	31

== Certifications ==
Region	Certification	Certified units/sales
Australia (ARIA)	Gold	35,000^{‡}
Brazil (Pro-Música Brasil)	3× Platinum	120,000^{‡}
Canada (Music Canada)	Platinum	80,000^{‡}
France (SNEP)	Platinum	200,000^{‡}
Italy (FIMI)	Platinum	70,000^{‡}
Mexico (AMPROFON)	2× Platinum	120,000^{‡}
Poland (ZPAV)	Gold	10,000^{‡}
Portugal (AFP)	2× Platinum	20,000^{‡}
Spain (Promusicae)	2× Platinum	120,000^{‡}
Switzerland (IFPI Switzerland)	Gold	10,000^{‡}
United Kingdom (BPI)	Silver	200,000^{‡}
United States (RIAA)	Gold	500,000^{‡}
^{‡} Sales+streaming figures based on certification alone.

== Release history ==
Country	Date	Format	Label
Various	May 28, 2020	Digital download; streaming	Epic; Columbia
Italy	May 29, 2020	Contemporary hit radio	Sony
