= La Noche de Anoche =

2021 single by Bad Bunny and Rosalía

Single by Bad Bunny and Rosalía

from the album El Último Tour Del Mundo
- Language: Spanish
- English title: "The Night of Last Night"
- Released: February 14, 2021
- Recorded: July 2020
- Genre: Reggaeton
- Length: 3:23
- Label: Rimas
- Songwriters: Benito Martínez Ocasio; Rosalia Vila Tobella; Chris Jedi; Marco Masís
- Producers: Chris Jedi; Gaby Music; Tainy

Bad Bunny singles chronology
"Booker T" (2021)	"La Noche de Anoche" (2021)	"100 Millones" (2021)

Rosalía singles chronology
"Lo Vas a Olvidar" (2021)	"La Noche de Anoche" (2021)	"Linda" (2021)

Music video
- "La Noche de Anoche" on YouTube

"La Noche de Anoche" (transl. "The Night of Last Night") is a song recorded by Puerto Rican rapper Bad Bunny in collaboration with Spanish singer Rosalía (Note: Rosalía was originally promoted as a featured artist, but was credited as a lead following the release.) from his third studio album El Último Tour Del Mundo (2020). The track was written by both performers alongside Tainy and Chris Jedi and produced by the latter two with Gaby Music. A fan favorite, it was released as the fourth and final single off the album on February 14, 2021, through Rimas Entertainment along with its music video.

== Background ==
The performers first met at the Coachella Valley Music and Arts Festival in April 2019, where they took some pictures that would later be used to promote the single. A couple days later, Bad Bunny attended Rosalía's concert at the Mayan Theater in Los Angeles, sparking rumors of a future musical collaboration and a possible romance, which was later denied.

In July 2020, as the COVID-19 pandemic travel restrictions started to ease, Rosalía travelled to San Juan to work on her upcoming studio album. There, she worked with Tainy, Chris Jedi, Gaby Music and Tego Calderón among others. Bad Bunny later told Billboard that they and Rosalía wanted to work together for a long time, but the right song or moment hadn't come up. However, while in Puerto Rico, Jeday sent him a rhythmic base that he had been working on with the Spanish singer and "I thought it was cool, but I let it sit for a while. A couple days later I couldn't stop singing the song. So I told Chris I would take a stab and see what comes out".

On November 25, Bad Bunny surprisingly revealed the cover art, tracklist and release date for his third studio album. This was after he had announced in YHLQMDLG that he would release an album nine months after that one and then retire for an indefinite period of time. However, the pandemic situation made him change his mind. "La Noche de Anoche", released two days later, became an instant fan favorite and a remarkable one for critics.

== Composition ==
"La Noche de Anoche" is a mid-tempo reggaeton track incorporating pop.

== Commercial performance ==
"La Noche de Anoche" marked the ninth best debut on the platform in 2020 and the second biggest debut on Spotify Spain in music history. Bad Bunny performed the song along with Rosalía during his stint on Saturday Night Live on February 20.

== Charts ==
=== Weekly charts ===
Weekly chart performance for "La Noche de Anoche"
Chart (2020–2021)	Peak position
Argentina Hot 100 (Billboard)	3
Bolivia (Monitor Latino)	8
Colombia (Monitor Latino)	7
Costa Rica (Monitor Latino)	18
Dominican Republic (Monitor Latino)	1
El Salvador (Monitor Latino)	18
Global 200 (Billboard)	7
Honduras (Monitor Latino)	7
Mexico Streaming (AMPROFON)	5
Nicaragua (Monitor Latino)	9
Paraguay (Monitor Latino)	8
Paraguay (SGP)	5
Peru (Monitor Latino)	8
Portugal (AFP)	118
Puerto Rico (Monitor Latino)	1
Spain (Promusicae)	1
Switzerland (Schweizer Hitparade)	41
Uruguay (Monitor Latino)	9
US Billboard Hot 100	53
US Hot Latin Songs (Billboard)	2
US Latin Airplay (Billboard)	1
US Latin Rhythm Airplay (Billboard)	1

=== Year-end charts ===
Year-end chart performance for "La Noche de Anoche"
Chart (2021)	Position
Global 200 (Billboard)	45
Portugal (AFP)	118
Spain (PROMUSICAE)	20
US Hot Latin Songs (Billboard)	4

== Certifications ==
Region	Certification	Certified units/sales
Italy (FIMI)	Gold	35,000^{‡}
Portugal (AFP)	Platinum	10,000^{‡}
Spain (Promusicae)	6× Platinum	360,000^{‡}
^{‡} Sales+streaming figures based on certification alone.

== Release history ==
Country	Date	Format	Label	Ref
Various	November 27, 2020	Digital download; streaming	Rimas	

== See also ==
- List of Billboard number-one Latin songs of 2021
