= Spell =

Spell(s) or The Spell(s) may refer to:

== Processes ==
- Spell (paranormal), an incantation
- Spell (ritual), a magical ritual
- Spelling, the writing of words

== Arts and entertainment ==
=== Film and television ===
- The Spell (1977 film), an American television film
- The Spell (2009 film), a British horror film
- Spell (2014 film), a Thai film; see List of 2014 box office number-one films in Thailand
- Spell (film), a 2020 American horror film directed by Mark Tonderai
- "Spell" (Smallville), a television episode

=== Literature ===
- The Spell (novel), a 1998 novel by Alan Hollinghurst
- Spells (anthology), a 1985 anthology of fantasy and science fiction short stories
- Spells (novel), a 2010 novel by Aprilynne Pike
- Spell No. 7, a 1979 choreopoem by Ntozake Shange

=== Music ===
- Enharmonic spelling, how a musical note is indicated
- Spells, a choral work by Richard Rodney Bennett

==== Performers ====
- Spell, a 1993 duo consisting of Boyd Rice and Rose McDowall
- The Spells, a duo consisting of Carrie Brownstein and Mary Timony

==== Albums ====
- Spel, by Bukkene Bruse, 2004
- Spell (album), by Deon Estus, or the title song, 1989
- Spells (album), by the Comas, 2007
- The Spell (Alphabeat album) or the title song (see below), 2009
- The Spell (The Black Heart Procession album), or the title song, 2006
- The Spell (Cellar Darling album) or the title song, 2019
- The Spell (Ivan Doroschuk album) or the title song, 1997
- The Spell (Kirka album), 1987
- The Spell, by Syreeta Wright, 1983
- Spell (EP), by DIA, 2016
- Spell, an EP by Noelia, or the title song, 2014

==== Songs ====
- "The Spell" (Alphabeat song), 2009
- "The Spell" (Mammoth song), 2025
- "Spell", by Hot Chip from A Bath Full of Ecstasy, 2019
- "Spell", by Patti Smith from Peace and Noise, 1997
- "The Spell", by Four Letter Lie from A New Day, 2009

=== Other media ===
- Spell (gaming), in role-playing games or game systems, a set of rules used to portray magic
- The Spell, a 1797–98 painting by Francisco Goya
- The Spell, an 1864 painting by William Fettes Douglas

== Other uses ==
- SPELL, an organization that promotes the constructed language Ladin Dolomitan
- spell (Unix), a spell checker program
- William Spell, American entrepreneur

== See also ==
- Spelling (disambiguation)
- Spell House (disambiguation)
- Dizzy Spells (disambiguation)
- Dry Spell (disambiguation)
