= Worser =

Worser may refer to:

- Worser Bay, a bay in New Zealand
- Worser Creek, a stream in Texas, USA

== See also ==
- Worse (disambiguation)
- Worst (disambiguation)
- Worster, surname
