= Drought (disambiguation) =

A drought is an extended period of months or years when a region notes a deficiency in its water supply.

Drought, The Drought, or variation, may also refer to:

== People with the surname ==
- Connor Drought (born 2001), American soccer player
- James William Drought (1931-1983), American author
- Cecil Charles Worster-Drought (1888-1971), British medical doctor, physician, neurologist

== Music ==
- Drought (EP), a 2012 EP by Deathspell Omega
- The Drought (The Kill Devil Hills album), 2006
- The Drought (Puce Mary album), 2018

== Other uses ==
- The Drought, a 1965 science fiction novel by British author J. G. Ballard
- "The Drought" (SATC episode), a 1998 television episode
- Drought, a 2011 speculative fiction book by Pam Bachorz
- Power drought, a near-synonym of a German word dunkelflaute analogous with hydrological droughts and long used in planning for hydroelectricity

== See also ==
- Worster-Drought (disambiguation)
- Dry Spell (disambiguation)
- The Drouth
- Draft (disambiguation), a word also spelled draught
