= Puce Mary =

Danish experimental musician

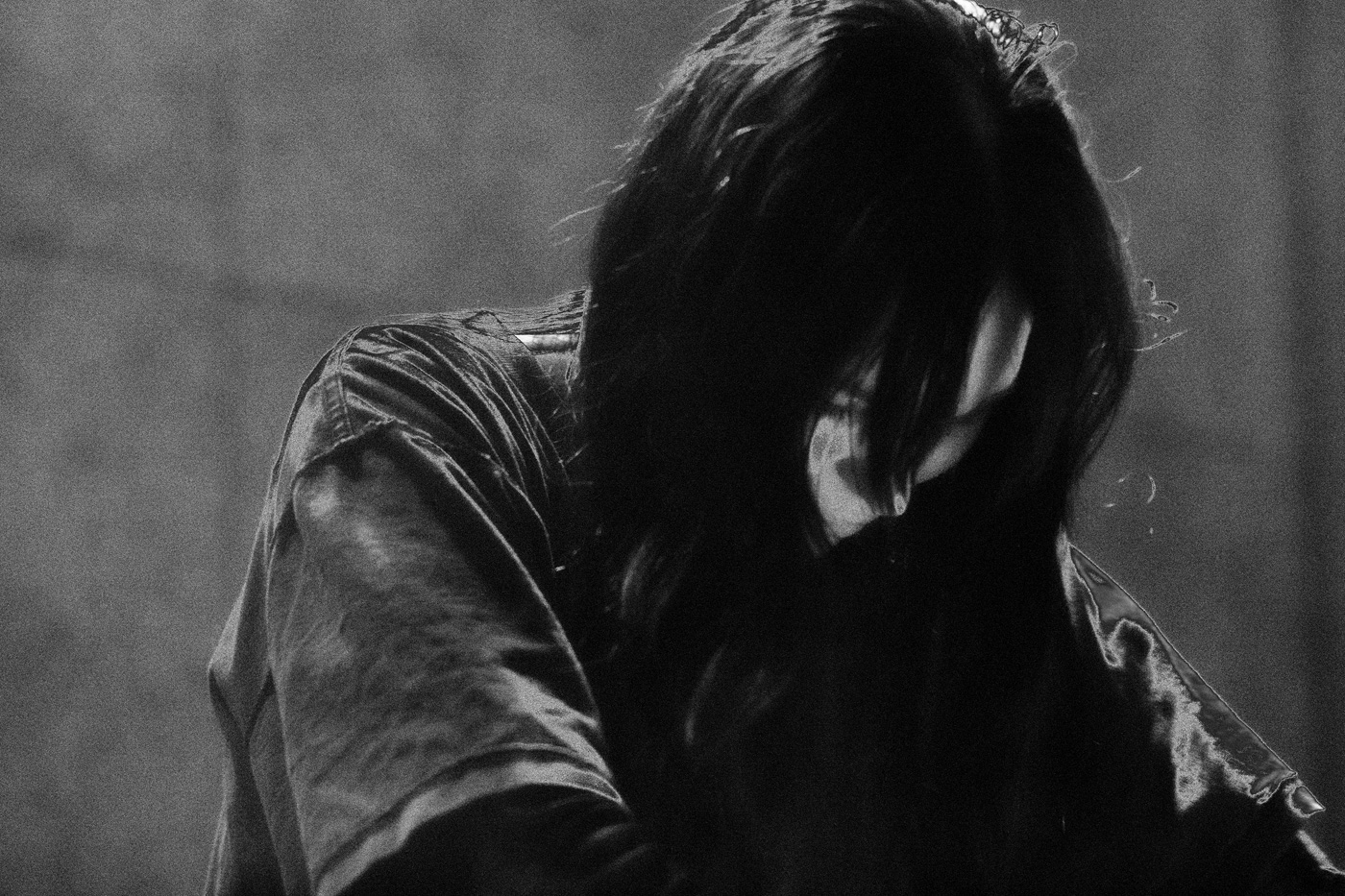
- Hoffmeier in 2014

Background information
- Also known as: Amphetamine Logic
- Born: Frederikke Sophie Hoffmeier; 1989 (age 36–37)
- Origin: Copenhagen, Denmark
- Genres: Power electronics; noise
- Occupations: Musician; composer; sound artist
- Years active: 2010–present
- Labels: Posh Isolation; PAN
- Formerly of: Timeless Reality
- Website: puce-mary.bandcamp.com

Frederikke Hoffmeier (born 1989), better known by her stage name Puce Mary, is a Danish experimental musician, composer and sound artist. She is known for her work in industrial, noise, and dark ambient music, gaining international recognition through releases on labels such as Posh Isolation and performances at major experimental music festivals.

== Biography ==
Frederikke Hoffmeier was born in 1989 in Denmark. She started her career in Copenhagen's underground music scene, performing with bands such as Timeless Reality, Body Sculptures (with VargT2M and Erik Enocksson. Her debut release under the name Puce Mary, Piss Flowers, was issued in cassette format in 2010. During this time, Hoffmeier collaborated with Loke Rahbek, also known as Croatian Amor, on multiple cassette-only releases. Her debut full-length album, Success, was released in 2013 on Posh Isolation record label. The record was followed up by 2014's Persona. Around this time, she obtained residency at EMS, a state-funded experimental music studio in Stockholm, Sweden.

In 2015, Hoffmeier collaborated with Rahbek on the full-length release, The Female Form. The following year saw the release of her fourth solo studio album, The Spiral. Her 2018 album, The Drought, was released on Berlin-based record label PAN and received positive reviews from publications such as Pitchfork, Resident Advisor and The Quietus. In the same year, she contributed to the track "Hope in Suffering (Escaping Oblivion & Overcoming Powerlessness)" by Yves Tumor, released on their album Safe in the Hands of Love.

At live performances following the release of The Spiral, Hoffmeier has collaborated with former Coil member Drew McDowall. In 2020, she scored the film Kød & Blod, which was directed by Jeanette Nordahl. It premiered at the Berlinale.

In 2024, she scored The Girl with the Needle, a Polish/Danish produced feature film which premiered at Cannes. She won the Excellence price for European Original Score at the European Film Awards and Best Music at the Polish Film Festival.

Hoffmeier resides in Copenhagen.

== Musical style ==
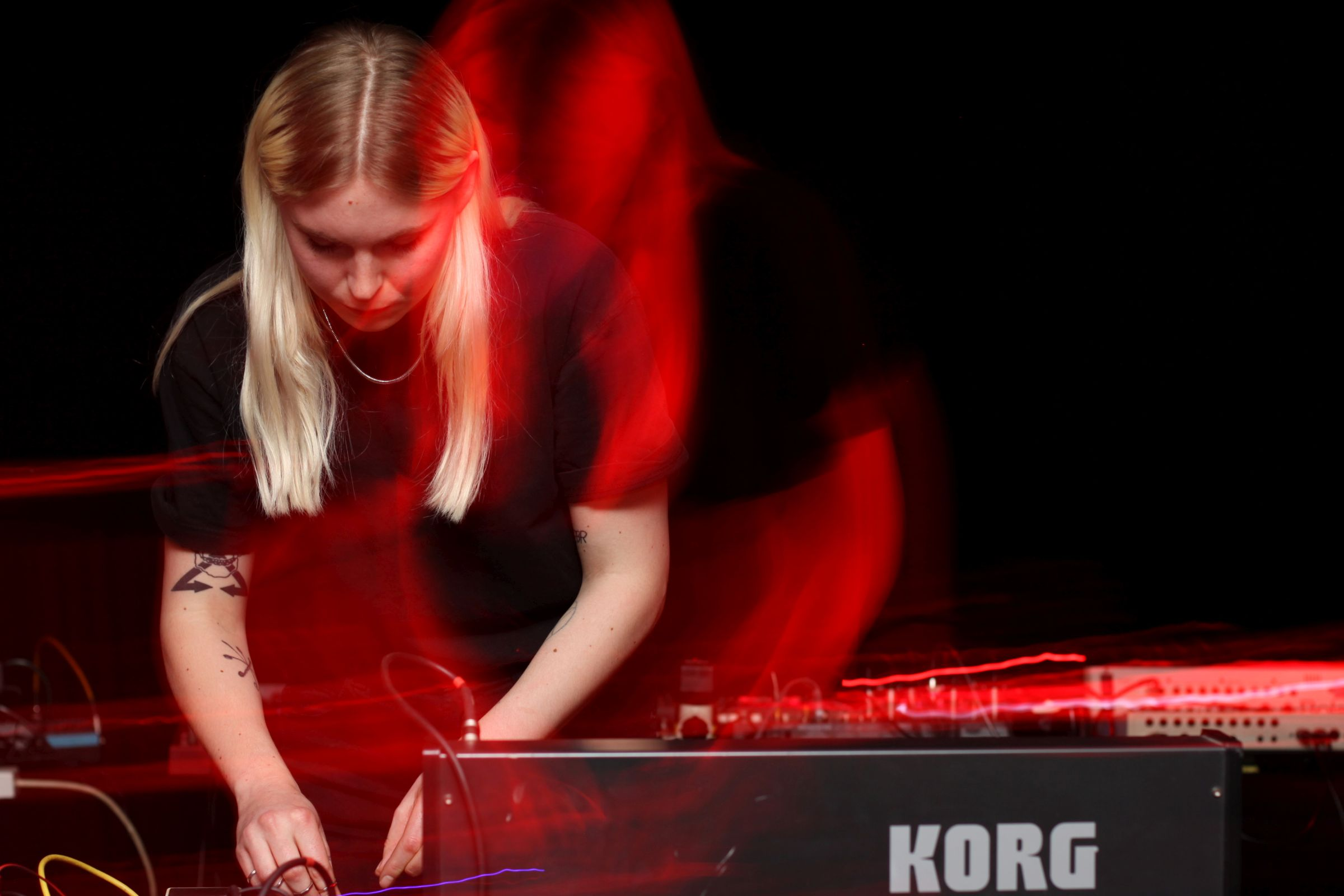
Puce Mary performing in 2014

Puce Mary's musical styles has been described as power electronics and noise music. According to Colin Joyce of Pitchfork, "grating percussive scraping and nail-on-chalkboard vocalizations dominate her [Hoffmeier's] creeping compositions, even as her instrumental work runs the gamut from deafening drones to clattering industrial drum beats." Pitchfork contributor Louis Pattison has noted that The Female Form, her collaboration with Loke Rahbek, "lingers on the threshold between gritty basement industrial and the rarified field of electroacoustic composition," while operating on the themes of "intimacy, communication, sexuality and gender identity." On her fourth record The Drought, Bob Cluness of The Quietus stated that: "Hoffmeier uses genre motifs of noise and industrial music here, not so much to bombard the listener with adolescent fantasies of power, transgression and provocation, but instead to look at such violence as possessing empathy based on action and transformation."

Puce Mary's live performances often stray away from the prerecorded material. On her musical workflow, she has emphasised "having a controlled set of variables and a system that is able to bear reproducible results." Likening her recording process to "a regenerated organ or an organ transplant," she states: "I want the chaos implied by this to be legible to the listener so when a rhythm is guiding their ears along a piece of music, they are not carried away and are very much aware that a single tone, a single beat, can stop that sound and time completely."

Hoffmeier has cited ambient music and real-life soundscapes as influences outside the industrial sounds.

== Discography ==
Full-length releases

- Success (2013)
- Persona (2014)
- The Spiral (2016)
- The Drought (2018)
- You Must Have Been Dreaming (2022) — self-released
- Stuck (2022) — self-released

Collaborative full-length releases

- The Closed Room (2011; with Loke Rahbek)
- An Exploitative Version of Surrogacy (2019; with Francesco Leali, Heith and Alessandro Branca)

EPs and cassette releases

- Piss Flowers (2010)
- Lucia (2011; with Loke Rahbek)
- Rubber Therapy (2012)
- Ultimate Hypocrisy (2013)
- The Viewer (2014)
- The Great Panic (2014)
- Masks Are Aids (2014; with Sewer Election)
- Fear and Pleasure (2014)
- PM/RS (2014; with Rodger Stella)
- Yours (2016)
- Sleep (2018)

Singles

- "Red Desert" (2018)
- "Caressing the Sun" (2019)

As Frederikke Hoffmeier

- Den blege grå tone (2012; with Sewer Election)
- Aska (2013; with Sewer Election)

As Amphetamine Logic

- Nostalgia Without Memory (2010)
- The Echoes of the Gestapo Cellar (2013; with Jan Warnke, Michael Esposito and Fantom Auditory Operations)
