= Worster-Drought =

Worster-Drought may refer to:

- Cecil Charles Worster-Drought (1888–1971), British medical doctor, physician, neurologist
- Worster-Drought syndrome, a form of congenital suprabulbar paresis associated with cerebral palsy
- Familial British dementia, a.k.a. Worster-Drought syndrome

== See also ==
- Drought (disambiguation)
- Worster, a surname
