= Parody (disambiguation) =

A parody is a creative work that imitates, comments on, or mocks its subject.

Parody may also refer to:

- Dyson Parody (born 1984), Gibraltarian professional darts player
- Gina Parody (born 1973), Colombian politician
- "Parody", a song by Yves Tumor from Praise a Lord Who Chews but Which Does Not Consume
