= Mono no aware (disambiguation) =

Mono no aware is a Japanese idiom.

Mono no aware may also refer to:

- Mono No Aware (film), a 2026 drama film by BC Amparado
- Mono No Aware (organization), a cinema-arts non-profit organization
- Mono No Aware (album), a 2017 compilation album by various artists
- Mono No Aware, a 2016 album by Johnny Foreigner
- "Mono no aware", a short story by Ken Liu
