= Trinity (mixtape) =

- Cover to the initial release, the reissue has Eartheater in a white bodysuit

Mixtape by Eartheater
- Released: October 18, 2019
- Genre: Electronic
- Length: 35:45
- Language: English
- Label: Chemical X
- Producer: AceMo; Color Plus; Dadras; Kwes Darko; denzxl; Hara Kiri; Tony Seltzer

Eartheater chronology
Irisiri (2018)	Trinity (2019)	Phoenix: Flames Are Dew Upon My Skin (2020)

Singles from Trinity
- 1. "High Tide" Released: August 21, 2019; 2. "Fontanel" Released: October 16. 2019

Trinity is the debut mixtape by American electronic musician Eartheater. It was released through Chemical X on October 18, 2019. It has received positive reviews from critics.

== Reception ==
Pitchfork Media's Sasha Geffen scored this album a 7.3 out of 10, writing that Eartheater's "signature oblique vocals remain a slippery presence" in "a blissful release that bursts past the cerebral parameters of her prior work and into new territory". Kiana Mickles of Resident Advisor writes that "with an air of yearnful sensuality, these tracks are more club and pop-oriented than those that defined Irisiri and an older Eartheater LP, Metalepsis" and the songs "draw from the gentlest sounds of old-school rave and pop".

== Track listing ==
All songs written by Eartheater

1. "Prodigal Self" – 4:25
2. "High Tide" – 3:00
3. "Supersoaker" – 3:05
4. "Spill the Milk" – 3:40
5. "Lick My Tears" – 3:06
6. "Pearl Diver" – 3:18
7. "Preservation" – 3:41
8. "Runoff" – 3:48
9. "Fontanel" – 3:40
10. "Solid Liquid Gas" – 4:04

Bonus tracks on the 2022 reissue

11. "High Tide" (Doss remix) – 3:43
12. "Supersoaker" (Coucou Chloe Remix) – 3:08
13. "Fontanel" (Sammy Remix) – 4:36
14. "Solid Liquid Gas" (Kiri VIP) – 4:49
15. "Spill the Milk" (LCY Remix) – 4:55
16. "Pearl Diver" (Nation Remix) – 3:29
17. "Preservation" (Eartheater VIP vs the Dillinger Escape Plan) – 3:39

== Personnel ==
- Eartheater – instrumentation, vocals, executive production
- AceMo – production on "Prodigal Self", "High Tide", "Supersoaker", and "Pearl Diver"
- Sam Clarke – photography
- Color Plus – production on "Preservation"
- Dadras – production on "Fontanel"
- Kwes Darko – production on "Spill the Milk"
- denzxl – production on "Runoff"
- Heba Kadry – mastering
- Hara Kiri – production on "Solid Liquid Gas"
- Tony Seltzer – production on "Spill the Milk" and "Lick My Tears"
- Kiri Stensby – mixing
- Christian Velasquez – art direction

== See also ==
- List of 2019 albums
