= Eartheater (musician) =

American singer-songwriter and producer

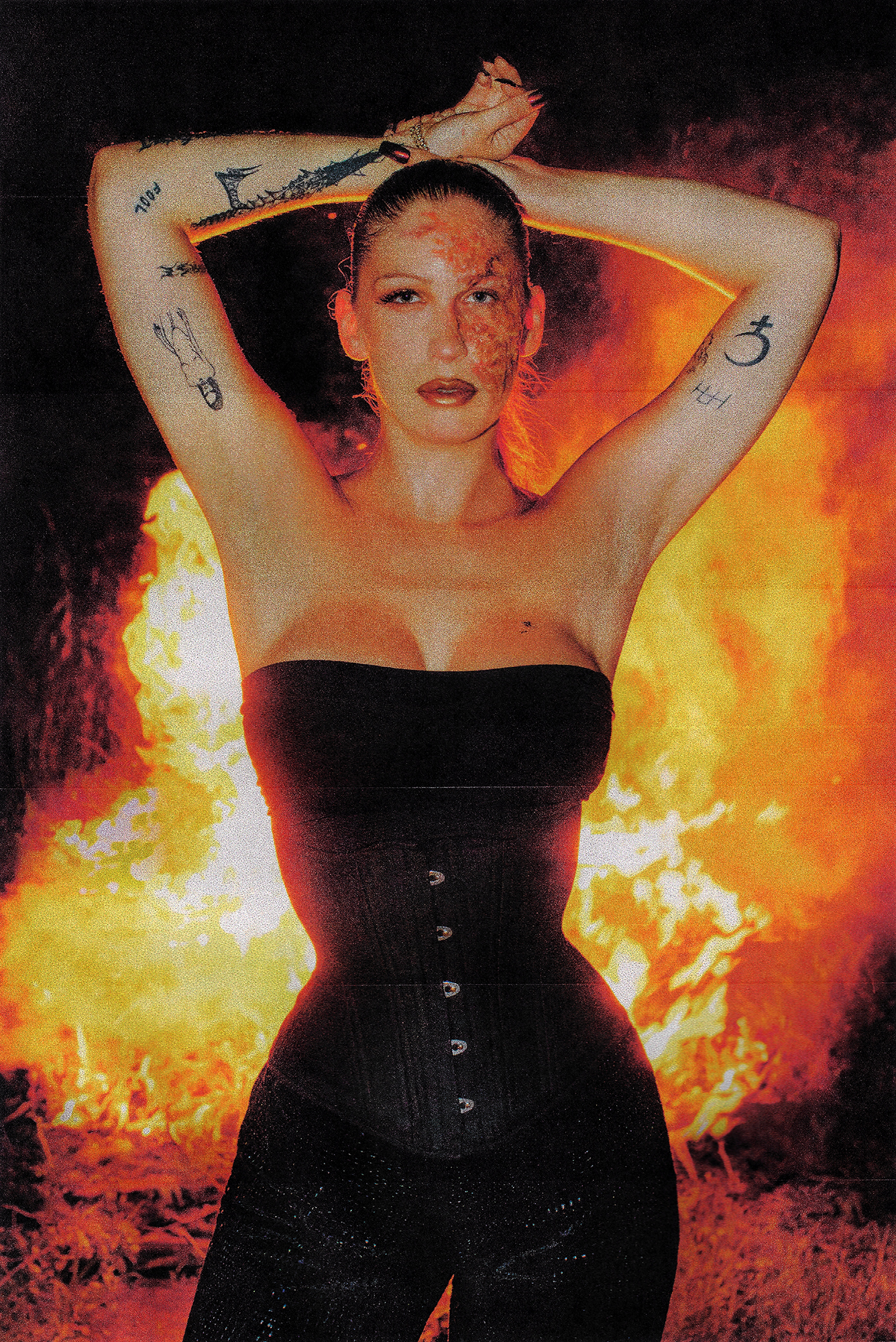
- Eartheater in 2020

Background information
- Also known as: Trinity Vigorsky
- Born: Alexandra Audrey Drewchin; March 16, 1989 (age 37); Northeastern Pennsylvania, U.S.
- Origin: New York City, U.S.
- Genres: Experimental electronic; industrial pop; psychedelic folk
- Occupations: Singer; songwriter; producer; composer; musician
- Instruments: Vocals; piano; guitar; keyboards
- Years active: 2009–present
- Labels: Hausu Mountain; PAN; Chemical X; Mad Decent

Alexandra Audrey Drewchin (Russian: Александра Дрючин, romanized: Aleksandra Dryuchin; born March 16, 1989), known professionally as Eartheater, is an American singer, songwriter, multi-instrumentalist, and producer. Born in Pennsylvania to a Russian father and an English mother, she has been performing since 2009, and is currently based in Queens, New York. Her music has been released on independent labels Hausu Mountain and PAN.

== Career ==
Eartheater has said that her stage name was inspired by a character eating earth in Gabriel García Márquez's novel One Hundred Years of Solitude. After combining the words "earth" and "eater" into "Eartheater", she realized that the name also reads as "ear theater", a deliberate double meaning reflecting her interest in linguistic ambiguity and hidden wordplay. She has also noted that the name contains additional embedded words, including "e-art" and "heater", allowing for yet another interpretation ("e-art heater").

Eartheater has released five full-length solo albums and one mixtape. Metalepsis (March 2015) and RIP Chrysalis (November 2015) were released on the Chicago-based label Hausu Mountain. Reviewing her first album, Colin Joyce of Pitchfork noted that "Metalepsis is music that's built to overwhelm and envelop you, and maybe even, as Drewchin's moniker suggests, swallow worlds whole."

Irisiri (June 2018) was released on Berlin-based PAN. Andrew Ryce of Resident Advisor described the album as "baffling and inspired in equal measure", and Pitchfork named it one of "the best experimental albums of 2018".

After contributing a new one-off track to a Doom Trip compilation in April, Eartheater announced in August 2019 that she would release the mixtape Trinity in October 2019 via her own imprint, Chemical X.

In May 2020, Eartheater shared the single "Below the Clavicle", which was later included on her fourth album, Phoenix: Flames Are Dew Upon My Skin, released through PAN on October 2, 2020. The album was mostly created over a ten-week artist residency in Zaragoza, Spain, drawing inspiration from the Earth's geology.

Her album Powders was released on September 20, 2023. To promote the album, Eartheater embarked on the Powders Tour which included stops in festivals such as Coachella in California and Primavera Sound in Barcelona.

== Collaborations ==
In addition to her solo work, Eartheater has collaborated with artists like Show Me the Body and Moor Mother.

In 2019, Eartheater and the experimental duo LEYA released the Angel Lust EP together. They had previously collaborated on the track "666" off the duo's 2018 album The Fool.

She also contributed guitar on the 2019 Caroline Polachek single "Ocean of Tears" and has covered Mazzy Star's "Fade into You" with Sega Bodega on Reestablishing Connection, a cover project benefiting the AIM COVID-19 Crisis Fund.

In November 2022, Madonna's daughter Lourdes Leon released her debut EP Go, executively produced by Eartheater, under the moniker Lolahol via Chemical X. The same year, Eartheater and the American producer LSDXOXO released the song "Demons".

In 2025, she enlisted British singer and DJ Shygirl for two of her songs, "Shark Brain" and "Dolphin". In the same year, she was also credited as a producer for FKA Twigs' album Eusexua and performed background vocals for its title track. She was also featured in the alternate version of "Striptease" from the reissue of Twigs' album.

== Discography ==
=== Studio albums ===
Title	Details
Metalepsis	Released: February 24, 2015; Label: Hausu Mountain; Format: streaming, digital download, CD, LP, cassette
RIP Chrysalis	Released: October 20, 2015; Label: Hausu Mountain; Format: streaming, digital download, CD, LP, cassette
Irisiri	Released: June 8, 2018; Label: PAN; Format: streaming, digital download, CD, LP, cassette
Phoenix: Flames Are Dew Upon My Skin	Released: October 2, 2020; Label: PAN; Format: streaming, digital download, CD, LP
Powders	Released: September 20, 2023; Label: Chemical X, Mad Decent; Format: streaming, digital download, CD, LP, cassette
Heavenly Body: If I'm the Bottle You're the Message	Release date: July 14, 2026; Label: Chemical X, Mad Decent, Because Music; Format: streaming, digital download, CD, LP, cassette

=== Mixtapes ===
Title	Details
Trinity	Released: October 18, 2019; Label: Chemical X; Format: streaming, digital download, LP, cassette

=== Remix albums ===
Title	Details
Phoenix: La Petite Mort Édition	Released: January 26, 2021; Label: PAN; Format: streaming, digital download, LP, cassette

=== Extended Plays ===
Title	Details
Angel Lust (with Leya)	Released: December 20, 2019; Label: PAN; Format: streaming, digital download

=== Singles ===
Title	Year	Album
"Infinity"	2013	Metalepsis
"C.L.I.T"	2018	Irisiri
"Claustra"	2018	Irisiri
"Inclined"	2018	Irisiri
"Concealer"	2019	Non-album single
"High Tide"	2019	Trinity
"Frontanel"	2019	Trinity
"Below the Clavicle"	2020	Phoenix: Flames Are Dew Upon My Skin
"How To Fight"	2020	Phoenix: Flames Are Dew Upon My Skin
"Volcano"	2020	Phoenix: Flames Are Dew Upon My Skin
"Faith Consuming Hope"	2021	Phoenix: Flames Are Dew Upon My Skin
"Scripture"	2021	Non-album singles
"Mitosis"	2022	Non-album singles
"Pure Smile Snake Venom"	2023	Powders
"Chop Suey"	2023	Powders
"Crushing"	2023	Powders
"Shark Brain" (featuring Shygirl)	2025	Non-album singles
"Dolphin" (featuring Shygirl)	2025	Non-album singles
"Nova"	2025	Heavenly Body: If I’m the Bottle You're the Message
"8"	2025	Metalepsis (10th Anniversary Edition)
"Paradise Rains"	2026	Heavenly Body: If I’m the Bottle You're the Message
"Crown Jewel"	2026	Heavenly Body: If I’m the Bottle You're the Message
"Wasp In the Fig"	2026	Heavenly Body: If I’m the Bottle You're the Message
