= Serpent Music =

Studio album by Yves Tumor
- Released: September 23, 2016
- Genres: Sound collage; experimental; noise
- Length: 44:00
- Label: PAN
- Producer: Yves Tumor

Yves Tumor chronology
When Man Fails You (2015)	Serpent Music (2016)	Safe in the Hands of Love (2018)

Serpent Music is the second studio album by American experimental musician and record producer Yves Tumor. It was released on September 23, 2016 on PAN record label.

== Background and style ==
Serpent Music was recorded over a three-year period in Miami, Leipzig, Los Angeles and Berlin. The record was originally titled as God Fearing; Tumor was inspired by personal relationships and spiritual themes, as well as Motown and soul music that Tumor's father used to play during their youth. Tumor refrained from the record on Bandcamp, anticipating its spread. After PAN founder Bill Kouligas praised the unfinished record, Tumor finished Serpent Music for its PAN release.

Described as an impressionistic collage, the album incorporates organic instruments, samples and field recordings. In addition to soul, the record features influences from ambient, club, pop, psychedelia and noise music. Eden Tizard of The Quietus regarded "juxtaposition" as a defining characteristic of Serpent Music, noting that "it merges ideas which would logically seem incompatible - grating noise one minute, blissed-out digital soul the next." Pitchfork's Andy Beta compared the sonic traits of the record to those of James Ferraro and Dean Blunt, noting that "Tumor favors mysterious loops, soul music as rendered by the recently concussed and noise-as-loofah." The press release reported that the album was "initially composed as a soul record." On the soul description, Tumor has stated: "I never thought of it as soul music, but that’s just what I was doing."

== Critical reception ==
Professional ratings
Aggregate scores
Source	Rating
Metacritic	77/100
Review scores
Source	Rating
Pitchfork	7.3/10
Resident Advisor	3.7/5
Tiny Mix Tapes	4/5 stars

At Metacritic, which assigns a normalized rating out of 100 to reviews from mainstream publications, Serpent Music received an average score of 77, based on 6 reviews, indicating "generally favorable reviews". Pitchfork critic Andy Beta wrote: "While it doesn’t always work, it’s Yves Tumor’s use of field recordings that gives Serpent Music an ambulatory quality." Beta further explained: "At times, such a sense of wandering makes the tracks feel unresolved or interrupted, but at other times it gives the sensation of being lost in a strange urban landscape, alternating between endless gray blocks and brief glints of beauty." Angus Finlayson of Resident Advisor described the record as Tumor's "most naked and tender music, made with lush guitars, frazzled drum loops and his own heavenly falsetto," while stating that "at first it seems harmless; only later do you realise what you've gotten into." Tiny Mix Tapes's Rafael Lubner called the record "a study in disruption, in aggregated polarities" and remarked that "Serpent Music's pieces are never reducible to the singular [sonic form], either formally or emotionally." Reviewing for The Quietus, Eden Tizard wrote: "Toying with emotional themes of isolationism, loss and spirituality as opposed to fixed religious views, the album manages to somehow balance direct emotion with the indefinable and opaque."

The record was featured as number 13 on Noisey magazine's list of "The 33 Best Albums of 2016." On the album, Noisey critic Michelle Lhooq stated: "Like the artist himself, Serpent Music is a slithering, complex work that unfurls over repeated encounters—but the effect is infinitely moving, like painting a dreamy landscape with hot streaks of raw emotion."

== Track listing ==
All tracks are written by Yves Tumor.

1. "Devout" — 1:21
2. "The Feeling When You Walk Away" — 3:00
3. "Dajjal" — 2:57
4. "Role in Creation" — 2:11
5. "Serpent I" — 2:51
6. "Serpent II" — 3:12
7. "Broke In" (feat. Oxhy) — 4:30
8. "Seed" — 7:18
9. "Spirit in Prison" — 4:06
10. "Cherish" — 2:53
11. "Face of a Demon" — 1:38
12. "Perdition" — 8:03

== Personnel ==
Album personnel as adapted from liner notes.

- Yves Tumor — performer
- Ville Haimala — mixing
- Rashad Becker — mastering
- Daniel Sannwald — photography
- Bliss Serenity Resting — design
