= Irisiri =

Studio album by Eartheater
- Released: June 8, 2018
- Genre: Experimental • electronica
- Length: 39:15
- Label: PAN

Eartheater chronology
RIP Chrysalis (2015)	Irisiri (2018)	Trinity (2019)

Singles from Irisiri
- 1. "C.L.I.T" Released: March 20, 2018; 2. "Claustra" Released: May 10, 2018; 3. "Inclined" Released: June 1, 2018

Professional ratings
Aggregate scores
Source	Rating
Metacritic	81/100
Review scores
Source	Rating
Crack Magazine	7/10
Exclaim!	8/10
Pitchfork	7.4/10
PopMatters	8/10

Irisiri is the third studio album by American singer-songwriter and producer Eartheater. It was released on June 8, 2018 under PAN.

== Critical reception ==
Irisiri was met with "universal acclaim" reviews from critics. At Metacritic, which assigns a weighted average rating out of 100 to reviews from mainstream publications, this release received an average score of 81 based on 7 reviews. Aggregator Album of the Year gave the release a 74 out of 100 based on a critical consensus of 7 reviews.

Giving a review of the released on behalf of Crack Magazine, Gunseli Yalcinyaka said, "Set to a backdrop of organic harp chords and pillowy vocals, Drewchin manipulates her musical landscape with arrhythmic melodies and tripped-out beats which come together to form her unique sound. At times, this record can feel uncomfortable, with its abundance of vocal falsettos and staccato synths, but it is in this discomfort that IRISIRI reveals itself." Bryon Hayes from Exclaim! noted the release has "an evolving, extra-sensory shadow show replete with mutant classical music tropes, fractured electronic viscera, the dying gasps of a forgotten operating system, and an unmatched voice that veers between honey sweetness and contorted glossolalia."

Naming it among the best albums of early 2018, PopMatters reviewer Spyros Statis wrote: "Using a collage of sounds technique, Drewchin has produced an act that is hard to categorize. Electronic compositions meet noise injections, while her chameleonic vocal delivery enhances classical renditions."

=== Accolades ===
Accolades for Irisiri
Publication	Accolade	Rank
Crack Magazine	Crack Magazine's Top 50 Albums of 2018	45
EarBuddy	EarBuddy's Top 50 Albums of 2018	23
PopMatters	PopMatters' Top 70 Albums of 2018	36
PopMatters	PopMatters' Top 25 Electronic Albums of 2018	17
Tiny Mix Tapes	Tiny Mix Tapes' Top 50 Albums of 2018	24
The Wire	The Wire's Top 50 Albums of 2018	19
The Vinyl Factory	The Vinyl Factory's Top 50 Albums of 2018	45

== Track listing ==
Irisiri track listing
No.	Title	Length
1.	"Peripheral"	3:04
2.	"Inclined"	2:32
3.	"Not Worried"	2:32
4.	"Inkling"	2:02
5.	"MTTM"	2:54
6.	"Inhale Baby" (featuring Odwalla1221)	3:02
7.	"Curtains"	3:00
8.	"Slyly Child"	2:24
9.	"Switch"	4:37
10.	"Trespasses"	4:55
11.	"MMXXX" (featuring Moor Mother)	2:31
12.	"C.L.I.T."	3:56
13.	"OS in Vitro"	1:46
Total length:		39:15

Irisiri (Japanese Edition) track listing
No.	Title	Length
14.	"Claustra"	4:50
15.	"Angel in The Rough"	3:39
16.	"Mouth Feel Armageddon"	2:43
17.	"Skull Shining"	2:22
Total length:		52:52

Notes

- "MTTM" was later removed from all digital editions of the album due to sample clearing issues.
- "Claustra" was initially exclusive to the Japanese Edition of Irisiri, it was later included on all digital standard editions of the album.
