= Phoenix: Flames Are Dew Upon My Skin =

Studio album by Eartheater
- Released: October 2, 2020
- Genre: Experimental • Folktronica
- Length: 46:31
- Label: PAN

Eartheater chronology
Trinity (2018)	Phoenix: Flames Are Dew Upon My Skin (2020)	Powders (2023)

Singles from Phoenix: Flames Are Dew Upon My Skin
- 1. "Below The Clavicle" Released: May 5, 2020; 2. "How To Fight" Released: August 5, 2020; 3. "Volcano" Released: October 2, 2020; 4. "Faith Consuming Hope" Released: April 21, 2021

Professional ratings
Aggregate scores
Source	Rating
Metacritic	78/100
Review scores
Source	Rating
Resident Advisor	80/100
Pitchfork	7.8/10

Phoenix: Flames Are Dew Upon My Skin is the fourth studio album by American singer-songwriter and producer Eartheater. It was released on October 2, 2020, under PAN.

== Development and production ==
"Phoenix: Flames Are Dew Upon My Skin" was developed during Eartheater's two month FUGA residency in Zaragoza, Spain. It takes a journey back to acoustic sound helped and provided by the acoustics of Eutopia's reverb chamber. The main themes on the album are birth, death and rebirth, that's why Eartheater chose the phoenix as a representative symbol of it. The album was produced, recorded and developed between October 1 and December 2, 2019. "Phoenix: Flames Are Dew Upon My Skin" was announced on August 5, 2020, and released on October 2.

== Track listing ==
Phoenix: Flames Are Dew Upon My Skin track listing
No.	Title	Length
1.	"Airborne Ashes"	3:27
2.	"Metallic Taste of Patience"	3:50
3.	"Below The Clavicle"	3:59
4.	"Burning Feather"	1:26
5.	"How To Fight"	3:31
6.	"Kiss of The Phoenix"	3:03
7.	"Volcano"	4:35
8.	"Fantasy Collision"	4:38
9.	"Mercurial Nerve"	2:15
10.	"Goodbye Diamond"	1:28
11.	"Bringing Me Back"	5:19
12.	"Diamond In The Bedrock"	4:13
13.	"Faith Consuming Hope"	4:51
Total length:		46:31

Japanese Bonus Track track listing
No.	Title	Length
14.	"Little Horns"	2:01
Total length:		48:32
