= RIP Chrysalis =

Studio album by Eartheater
- Released: October 20, 2015
- Recorded: 2015
- Studio: Eartheater's home studio; Gravesend Studio ("Humyn Hymn" and "RIP Chrysalis")
- Genre: Electronic music
- Length: 43:03
- Language: English
- Label: Hausu Mountain

Eartheater chronology
Metalepsis (2015)	RIP Chrysalis (2015)	Irisiri (2018)

RIP Chrysalis is the second studio album by American electronic musician Eartheater. It was released through Hausu Mountain on October 20, 2015. It has received positive reviews from critics.

== Reception ==
Professional ratings
Review scores
Source	Rating
Pitchfork Media	7.7/10
TinyMixTapes	4/5 stars

Writing for Pitchfork Media, J. Edward Keyes rated this album a 7.7 out of 10, calling it "expansive" and "free-form" and "the sound of someone figuring themselves out in real time, making all of their distinct voices harmonize, and creating new musical forms to share their discoveries". Pat Beane of TinyMixTapes rated RIP Chrysalis 4 out of 5, characterizing it as "dripping with imagination".

== Track listing ==
All songs written by Alexandra Drewchin.

1. "Utterfly FX" – 6:50
2. "Ecdysisyphus" – 1:20
3. "RIP Chrysalis" – 2:55
4. "Humyn Hymn" – 5:37
5. "Mask Therapy" – 3:49
6. "Herstory of Platypus" – 2:52
7. "Petal Head" – 1:24
8. "Wetware" – 5:56
9. "If It in Yin" – 6:52
10. "Metamorphlexible" – 5:28

== Personnel ==
- Eartheater – instrumentation, vocals, design, cover
- Maxwell Allison – design
- Silas Drewchin – "Metamorphlexible"
- Julian Fader – drums on "Humyn Hymn" and "RIP Chrysalis", vocals on "Humyn Hymn" and "RIP Chrysalis"
- Carlos Hernandez – piano on "Humyn Hymn" and "RIP Chrysalis", vocals on "Humyn Hymn" and "RIP Chrysalis"
- Hunter Jack – violin on "Humyn Hymn" and "RIP Chrysalis", vocals on "Humyn Hymn" and "RIP Chrysalis"
- Patrick Klem – mastering
- Adam Markowitz – violin on "Humyn Hymn" and "RIP Chrysalis", vocals on "Humyn Hymn" and "RIP Chrysalis"
- Ariel Zanbenedetti – cello on "Humyn Hymn" and "RIP Chrysalis", vocals on "Humyn Hymn" and "RIP Chrysalis"

== See also ==
- List of 2015 albums
