= Scenario =

Scenario or scenarios may refer to:

== Management, science and technology ==
- Scenario planning, a strategic planning method from future studies
- Scenario (computing), the interaction between a computer user and a computer system or between two software components
- Scenario optimization, is a technique for obtaining solutions to problems based on randomization of the constraints
- Scenario (vehicular automation), a sequence of conditions in the field of vehicular automation
- User scenario, used to communicate an idea for a product or experience involving interactivity

== Art, films, music and theatre ==
- Scenario in films, part of the screenwriting process, precursor to a screenplay
- Scenario (performing arts), a synoptical collage of an event or series of actions and events
- Scenario – A Journal for Drama and Theatre Pedagogy, a bilingual online journal
- Scenario (album), a 1983 album by Al Di Meola
- Scenarios (album), by Andy Milne and Grégoire Maret
- Scenario (song), a 1992 song by hip-hop group, A Tribe Called Quest
- Scenario (artwork), an artificially intelligent interactive cinema project

== See also ==
- Worst-case scenario (disambiguation)
- What if
