= The Comas =

American indie rock band

- Origin: Chapel Hill, North Carolina
- Genres: Indie rock
- Years active: 1998–2008
- Labels: Vagrant Records (2004-2008); Yep Roc Records (1998-2004)
- Members: Nicole Gehweiler; Matt Sumrow; Nic Gonzales; Andy Herod; Jason Caperton
- Past members: Justin Williams; Cameron Weeks; Adam Price; John Harrison; Margaret White
- Website: TheComas.com

The Comas were an indie rock band active from 1998 to 2008. They formed in Chapel Hill, NC, in March 1998 as a 'joke country band', a sort of counterweight to the hyped No Depression movement. Before long, however, both the "joke" and the "country" parts of the concept were eliminated, thus allowing the band to develop into an alternative rock outfit.

After the album Def Needle in tomorrow, John and Margaret left the band. Singer-songwriter Andy Herod continued on with Nicole Gehweiler who switching from keyboards to guitar. Nicole stepped into the role of as Herod's right-hand girl sharing harmonies as well as lead and rhythm guitar. Still embracing their stoner pop vibe, the band went on to record two more records with the addition of Jason Caperton on bass, Matt Sumrow and keyboards, and Nick Gonzales on drums.

In 2008, lead singer Andy Herod moved to Asheville, and formed a new project, called Electric Owls, which was signed to Vagrant Records. Electric Owls has produced two EPs and a full-length record titled 'Ain't Too Bright'. Assisting him in the studio were a few friends and former member Caperton.

== Discography ==
=== Albums ===
Year	Title	Label
1999	Wave to Make Friends	Plastique Records
2000	A Def Needle In Tomorrow	Yep Roc Records
2004	Conductor	Yep Roc Records
2007	Spells	Vagrant Records

=== EPs and Singles ===
Year	Title	Label
2001	Bumblebee / Shining Eyes / 1:30	Sit-n-Spin Records
