= October (musician) =

New Zealand musician and model

- Also known as: October and the Eyes
- Born: Emma Logan; October 1997 (age 29); Blenheim, New Zealand
- Origin: Auckland, New Zealand
- Genres: Industrial pop; rock
- Occupations: Singer; songwriter; record producer; model
- Instruments: Vocals; piano
- Years active: 2015–present
- Labels: Universal NZ; KRO
- Website: october-and-the-eyes.com

Emma Logan (born October 1997), known professionally as October, is a New Zealand singer, songwriter, record producer, and model. She moved from her hometown of Blenheim to Auckland to pursue a career in music and released her debut extended play (EP), Switchblade, in 2016. Her debut studio album, Ultra Red (2018), was self-written and self-produced by her and distributed by Universal Music NZ. In 2020, she began performing as October and the Eyes and released her two EPs under the name, Dogs and Gods (2020) and Who Upset You? (2022), through KRO Records; as of 2023, October and the Eyes performs live as a five-piece band.

== Life and career ==
Emma Logan was born in October 1997 and raised in Blenheim, New Zealand. She has two older brothers, who are both musicians. As a child, she played piano and was exposed to classical music through her mother, a music teacher, who would make her do activities while listening to it. She began writing music at age 12, when she learned the basics of GarageBand, and, in high school, joined a cover band. She taught herself how to produce electronic music at age 16 and began using a MIDI keyboard at age 17 to produce her music. She then began studying music in Wellington before dropping out after her first year and moving to Auckland, where she began meeting with record label executives and a music lawyer in pursuit of a musical career.

Logan's single "Voids" was released in October 2015. She released the electronic-influenced Switchblade, her debut extended play, in April 2016, and released her single "Cherry Cola" with help from NZ On Air in September of that year, which was endorsed by Lorde. Also in 2016, she performed as an opening act for Yung Lean and Broods. In August 2017, she walked the runway at New Zealand Fashion Week for Zambesi. She also released her singles "Pure" and "All She Does is Stare" in August and December 2017, respectively. Her single "1000 Eyes" was released in February 2018. Her debut studio album, Ultra Red, was intended for release in October 2017. After listening to the album, she felt it was "far too pop" due to production by the album's collaborators, including Joel Little and Thom Powers. She spent several months reproducing the songs until December 2017 and the finished version of Ultra Red was self-released by Logan on 18 April 2018 and distributed by Universal Music NZ.

In 2020, Logan started performing as October and the Eyes, became based in London, and got signed to KRO Records after her demo tape was sent by singer Yves Tumor to their producers. Her debut EP as October and the Eyes, Dogs and Gods, was released through KRO on 20 November 2020 and preceded by the single "All for You", which was released in October 2020. She had also modeled for brands such as Balenciaga and Charlotte Knowles by 2020. Her single "Spiral" was released in February 2022. In early 2022, she toured as opening act for Yves Tumor. In May 2022, she released the single "When I Was Your Girl", and released her EP Who Upset You? on 24 June 2022. As of 2023, October and the Eyes performs live as a five-piece band.

== Musical style ==
Logan based her initial stage name, October, on her being born in the month of October, and based the addition of "the Eyes" on her desire to collaborate with other musicians as well as her song "1000 Eyes". She has described herself as primarily a producer and stated that her vocals "add to what [she has] constructed, production-wise". She uses Logic Pro to produce her songs. She has described her music as October as pop with elements of industrial music and has called the persona of October a "more bold and commanding and confident version of [herself]", while describing her music as October and the Eyes as rock. She has called Siouxsie Sioux, David Bowie, and Bauhaus, as well as female record producers like Grimes, Sevdaliza, and FKA Twigs, her inspirations, and called King Krule, Sky Ferreira, and Yung Lean "heroes" of hers.

== Discography ==
=== As October ===
==== Studio albums ====
List of albums, with selected chart positions
Title	Album details	Peak chart positions
Title	Album details	NZ
Ultra Red	Released: 20 April 2018; Label: Universal NZ; Formats: Digital download, streaming	19

==== Extended plays ====
List of extended plays, with selected chart positions
Title	Album details	Peak chart positions
Title	Album details	NZ Hot
Switchblade	Released: 19 April 2016; Label: Self-released; Formats: Digital download, streaming	3

==== Singles ====
List of singles, with selected chart positions
Title	Year	Peak chart positions	Album
Title	Year	NZ Hot	Album
"Voids"	2015	–	Non-album singles
"Cherry Cola"	2016	–	Non-album singles
"Pure"	2017	–	Ultra Red
"All She Does is Stare"	2017	5	Ultra Red
"1000 Eyes"	2018	–	Ultra Red
"Body of Desire"	2018	–	Ultra Red

=== As October and the Eyes ===
==== Extended plays ====
List of extended plays, with selected chart positions
Title	Album details
Dogs and Gods	Released: 20 November 2020; Label: KRO; Formats: Digital download, streaming
Who Upset You?	Released: 24 June 2022; Label: KRO; Formats: Digital download, streaming

==== Singles ====
List of singles, with selected chart positions
Title	Year	Peak chart positions	Album
Title	Year	NZ Hot	Album
"Ramble"	2020	–	Non-album single
"Spiral"	2022	19	Who Upset You?
"When I Was Your Girl"	2022	–	Who Upset You?
