= Worst-case scenario (disambiguation) =

A worst-case scenario is a risk management planning tool.

Worst-case scenario may also refer to:

== Music ==
- Worst Case Scenario Records, a UK record label
- Worst Case Scenario (album), by dEUS
- "Worst Case Scenario" (song), by The Hoosiers
- "Worst Case Scenario", a song by Madi Diaz from the deluxe edition of Weird Faith

== Television ==
- Worst Case Scenario (Star Trek: Voyager), an episode
- Worst Case Scenarios, a reality show aired on TBS in 2002 in the U.S.
- Worst-Case Scenario (TV series), a survival show hosted by Bear Grylls aired on Discovery Channel in 2010

== Other uses ==
- Worst-Case Scenario series, of books, games, calendars, and two television series inspired by The Worst-Case Scenario Survival Handbook
- Worst Case Scenario (cancelled film), a Dutch horror film
- Worst Case Scenario (2014 film), a German film

== See also ==
- Worst-case complexity, in computer science
- Worst Case, a 2010 novel by James Patterson
- Murphy's law
- The Worst (disambiguation)
- Case (disambiguation)
- Scenario (disambiguation)
