= Worse =

Worse may refer to:

- Worse Creek, Chattooga River, Georgia, USA; a creek
- Worse set, in mathematics

== See also ==
- The Worst (disambiguation)
- Worser (disambiguation)
