= Worster =

Worster is a surname. Notable people with the surname include:

- Alexander Worster (1887–1952), British actor
- Cecil Charles Worster-Drought (1888–1971), British medical doctor
- Donald Worster (born 1941), U.S. environmental historian
- George H. Worster (1871–1965), justice of the Maine Supreme Judicial Court
- Grae Worster (born 1958), British fluid dynamicist
- José Worster (1765–1819), Spanish commander of Artillery
- Steve Worster (1949–2022), American football player

== See also ==
- Worster-Drought (disambiguation)
- The Worst (disambiguation)
