= Safe in the Hands of Love =

Studio album by Yves Tumor
- Released: September 5, 2018
- Studios: Paulie Sphere Sound (Mount Washington, Los Angeles)
- Genres: Electronic; experimental; experimental pop; plunderphonics; psychedelia
- Length: 41:57
- Label: Warp
- Producers: Yves Tumor; Justin Raisen (co.); Mahssa Taghinia (exec.); Luke Niccoli (add.); Puce Mary (add.)

Yves Tumor chronology
Serpent Music (2016)	Safe in the Hands of Love (2018)	Heaven to a Tortured Mind (2020)

Singles from Safe in the Hands of Love
- 1. "Noid" Released: July 24, 2018; 2. "Licking an Orchid" Released: August 29, 2018; 3. "Lifetime" Released: September 3, 2018

Safe in the Hands of Love is the third studio album by American experimental electronic music artist Yves Tumor. It was released on September 5, 2018, by Warp Records.

== Release ==
Tumor released "Noid" as the first single from the album on July 24, 2018, and followed it with "Licking an Orchid" featuring James K on August 29, and "Lifetime" on September 3. They shared the track "Economy of Freedom" the following day, and surprise released the album digitally the next day with no prior announcement. It is their first album released on Warp Records. Physical editions were released on October 12.

== Composition ==
=== Musical style ===
Tumor's former tracks had nestled themselves into the realms of ambient, noise and sound collage. Their 2017 track "Limerence" was lauded and was included in the ambient music compilation mono no aware, alongside various other musicians.

A "benchmark in experimental music", the eclectic nature of Safe in the Hands has resulted in various descriptors for the genres it spans, with it noted for sounding "freer to move than most," going "from sultry ambient to future soul, psychedelic pop, and everything in between."

=== Tracks ===
Instrumental opener "Faith in Nothing Except in Salvation" features "film-noir jazz trumpet" supplied by Will Artope. It is the first of three tracks to include Artope performing trumpet. The result would be "an off-kilter take on anthemic jazz" "that lends a sense of foreboding" to Safe in the Hands. The second track "Economy of Freedom" features contributions to the song's writing and arrangements from dark ambient musician Croatian Amor. Starting "with gauzy, resonant synths before dipping into ambient house", the song includes drum hits that "feel like something already dead hitting the floor" and "a lone vocal melody for the coda."

== Critical reception ==
Professional ratings
Aggregate scores
Source	Rating
AnyDecentMusic?	8.3/10
Metacritic	89/100
Review scores
Source	Rating
The Guardian	4/5 stars
MusicOMH	4/5 stars
Pitchfork	9.1/10
PopMatters	9/10
Resident Advisor	4.1/5
Tiny Mix Tapes	4.5/5 marks

At Metacritic, which assigns a normalized rating out of 100 to reviews from mainstream publications, Safe in the Hands of Love received an average score of 89, based on 9 reviews, indicating "universal acclaim". Eoin Murray of The Quietus stated that "Yves Tumor has let assertiveness, assuredness and vulnerability run wild within him for Safe in the Hands of Love and the result is magisterial and deeply engaging." Sypros Statis of PopMatters wrote, "What pushes Safe in the Hands of Love beyond the producer's previous works is the emotion that the record transmits. No matter if the synths are harsh, or the rhythm section arrives with the perfect groove, this is a work filled with an emotive purpose, and it is that core that makes it such a wonderful listen."

Tiny Mix Tapes writer Sam Goldner said, "Bowie's only consistent trajectory has been one of tearing down his mythos even as his builds it, and his latest manages to knock down yet another wall as he steps more fully into the light than he's ever dared tread before. On Safe in the Hands of Love, Yves Tumor isn't concerned with being "experimental;" he's simply concerned with being." Resident Advisor's Matthew McDermott wrote, "Yves Tumor joins the ranks of Arca and SOPHIE at the millennial generation's pop vanguard, a group whose fluid approach to music and imagery is eradicating the gap between underground and mainstream." The Wire said, "Sometimes the sensuousness of Serpent Music is missed, but Tumor's drive to take this radically new music to audiences as big as Blake's, Ocean's or even Radiohead's is exhilarating." MusicOMH critic Ben Devlin called the album "a fascinating synthesis of rock, plunderphonics, bass music and noise from an artist that remains stubbornly undefinable."

In his rave review for Pitchfork, Jayson Greene wrote, "You get the sense, maybe, that Tumor is carrying around other people's secrets, and that Safe in the Hands of Love is so cavernous-sounding, in part, to accommodate them. Holding all of this together is a stew of feelings—dread, sensuousness, ecstasy, terror—that melt into a mood so pungent and pervasive that people who grew up inside all kinds of different music will be beckoned towards it. Ambient electronic, dream-pop, experimental noise, '90s R&B, even late-'90s alt-rock—Tumor's music is fluid and generous enough to contain it all."

== Accolades ==
Safe in the Hands of Love was ranked the 50th best release of the year in The Wire magazine's annual critics' poll.

Accolades for Safe in the Hands of Love
Publication	List	Rank	Ref.
Metacritic	Best Albums of 2018	5	
BrooklynVegan	BrooklynVegan's Top 50 Albums of 2018	36	
Crack Magazine	The Top 50 Albums of 2018	4	
Noisey	The 100 Best Albums of 2018	57	
Pitchfork	The 50 Best Albums of 2018	10	
Pitchfork	The 200 Best Albums of the 2010s	125	
PopMatters	The 70 Best Albums of 2018	12	
Resident Advisor	2018's Best Albums	*	
Spin	The 51 Best Albums of 2018	40	
Sputnikmusic	Staff's Top Albums of 2018	45	
Tiny Mix Tapes	2018: Favorite 50 Music Releases	2	
Treble	The 10 Best Electronic Albums of 2018	1	
The Vinyl Factory	Our 50 favourite albums of 2018	14	
The Wire	2018 Rewind: Releases of the Year 1-50	50	

== Track listing ==
All tracks are written by Yves Tumor, except track 2, co-written by Croatian Amor, and track 7, lyrics written by Oxhy.

No.	Title	Length
1.	"Faith in Nothing Except in Salvation"	1:33
2.	"Economy of Freedom" (with Croatian Amor)	4:55
3.	"Honesty"	5:01
4.	"Noid"	3:29
5.	"Licking an Orchid" (featuring James K)	4:38
6.	"Lifetime"	3:42
7.	"Hope in Suffering (Escaping Oblivion & Overcoming Powerlessness)" (featuring Oxhy and Puce Mary)	4:56
8.	"Recognizing the Enemy"	4:49
9.	"All the Love We Have Now"	3:22
10.	"Let the Lioness in You Flow Freely"	5:32
Total length:		41:57

Safe in the Hands of Love – Japanese edition (bonus track)
No.	Title	Length
11.	"Applaud"	3:12
Total length:		45:09

Sample credits

- "Faith in Nothing Except in Salvation" contains a sample of "Swahililand" written and recorded by Ahmad Jamal
- "Noid" contains samples of "Grace", written by Ronnie Laws and Roxanne J. Seeman and recorded by Sylvia St. James
- "Let the Lioness in You Flow Freely" contains a sample of "Angel Fire", written and recorded by Jan Haflin

== Personnel ==
Credits adapted from the liner notes of Safe in the Hands of Love.

=== Musicians ===
- Yves Tumor – vocals; arrangement (track 2)
- Croatian Amor – arrangement (track 2)
- Will Artope – trumpet (tracks 1, 6, 10)
- Luke Niccoli – bass guitar (tracks 3–5)
- Evan Johns – drums (tracks 4–6)
- Andreas Emanuel – electric guitar (track 4); additional electric guitar (track 6)
- James K – vocals (track 5); additional violin (track 7)
- Derek Stein – cello (tracks 6–8)
- James Ferraro – additional grand piano (track 6)
- Oxhy – vocals (track 7)
- Jon Peven – additional percussion (track 8)

=== Technical personnel ===
- Yves Tumor – production
- Justin Raisen – co-production (tracks 1–8, 10); engineering
- Mahssa Taghinia – executive production, management
- Luke Niccoli – additional production, additional engineering, additional editing
- Puce Mary – additional production (track 7)
- Paul Corley – mixing
- Dave Cooley – mastering

=== Artwork ===
- Yves Tumor – creative direction, models casting
- Isamaya Ffrench – creative direction, art direction, makeup
- Mahssa Taghinia – creative direction
- Collin Fletcher – design
- Bliss Serenity Resting – logo, additional design
- Evanie Frausto – hair
- Midland Agency – models casting
- Nick Royal – wardrobe, style
- Jordan Hemingway – photography, video, production

== Release history ==
Region	Date	Label	Format	Ref.
Various	September 5, 2018	Warp	Digital download	
Various	October 12, 2018	Warp	2xLP; CD	
