= Conductor (album) =

Studio album by the Comas
- Released: August 24, 2004
- Genre: Indie rock
- Length: 44:00
- Label: Yep Roc

The Comas chronology
A Def Needle in Tomorrow (2000)	Conductor (2004)	Spells (2007)

Professional ratings
Review scores
Source	Rating
AllMusic	4/5 stars
Pitchfork Media	8.0/10

Conductor is an album by North Carolina indie rock band the Comas. The album was recorded by Alan Weatherhead at Sound of Music in Richmond, Va. It features Andy Herod on guitars and vocals, Nicole Gehweiler also on guitars and vocals, Justin Williams on bass and baritone guitars and Cameron Weeks on drums.

The album is accompanied by a DVD, Conductor: The Movie, which was written and directed by filmmaker/animator Brent Bonacorso. Combining live footage and animation the film stars lead singer Andy Herod and his ex-girlfriend Michelle Williams of Dawson's Creek fame. It features videos for each song seamlessly blended together.

The DVD also features a new song in the middle called "Bad Connexion", and as easter egg an alternate version of the movie. It is about 10 minutes shorter and some of the songs are in a different order. To access it, do the following:

While on the title page of the DVD there are two choices. The first choice, PLAY, is already highlighted. If you go down one you highlight the menu that lets you view each video. Go down one more and nothing should be highlighted. This is where you will find the hidden alternate version of Conductor: hit "play".

You will know you are looking at the alternate version when the beginning credits end, after the MOON, you see the soldiers running. This is right before "The Science Of Your Mind" starts. In the original version there are no soldiers.

== Track listing ==
All songs written by Andrew Herod.

1. "The Science of Your Mind" – 3:53
2. "Moonrainbow" – 3:15
3. "Tonight on the WB" – 3:26
4. "Invisible Drugs" – 2:21
5. "The Last Transmission" – 4:07
6. "Employment" – 3:17
7. "Hologram" – 2:27
8. "Dirty South" – 5:27
9. "Oh God" – 5:17
10. "Falling" – 3:40
11. "This Commercial" (hidden track) – 6:45
