= Heavenly Body: If I'm the Bottle You're the Message =

2026 studio album by Eartheater

Studio album by Eartheater
- Released: July 14, 2026
- Genre: Art pop
- Length: 40:16
- Labels: Chemical X; Mad Decent; Because Music
- Producers: Eartheater; Dave Sitek; Nosaj Thing; Michael Andrews

Eartheater chronology
Powders (2023)	Heavenly Body: If I'm the Bottle You're the Message (2026)

Singles from Heavenly Body: If I'm the Bottle You're the Message
- 1. "Nova" Released: June 6, 2025; 2. "Paradise Rains" Released: May 13, 2026; 3. "Crown Jewel" Released: June 10, 2026; 4. "Wasp In the Fig" Released: September 9, 2026

Heavenly Body: If I'm the Bottle You're the Message is the sixth studio album by American experimental musician Eartheater. It was released on July 14, 2026, through Chemical X and Because Music under exclusive license to Mad Decent.

The album was produced by Eartheater and Dave Sitek, with Nosaj Thing and Michael Andrews contributing production on "Nova". It was preceded by the singles "Nova", "Paradise Rains", and "Crown Jewel".

== Background and composition ==
Following the release of Powders in 2023, Eartheater began work on a new body of material inspired by "conception, gestation, and birth of her first child". The album was produced by Eartheater alongside Dave Sitek, with work beginning following the birth of her daughter in May 2025. She has stated that pregnancy provided "the highest degree of inspiration that you cannot deny", describing the album as an "exhibition" of her own experience. Another source of inspiration was Eartheater's purchase of her childhood family farm, where she had lived until the age of 15.

The album was announced on May 13, 2026, alongside its lead single, "Paradise Rains". The song was inspired by Eartheater's return to her childhood family farm after two decades. She revealed that she conceived her daughter the same day she returned to the property, describing the song as reflecting on memories transformed through love and new beginnings.

A second single, "Nova", was released on June 26, 2026, ahead of the album's release. The album also features a guest appearance from French musician Oklou on the song "Fast Asleep".

== Critical reception ==
Professional ratings
Review scores
Source	Rating
Clash	8/10
The Skinny	4/5 stars

Writing for Clash, Seth White described the album as a "universally expansive and diaristic tribute" to pregnancy, conveyed through "ambient excursions and post-wave experimental dance anthems" that channel "celestial divination" throughout the record. John Creely of The Skinny compared the production on "Practical Amnesia" and "Crown Jewel" to the sensation of feeling like "the centre figure in a snow globe". However, Creely also felt that the album's production becomes "unusually characterless" in its second half, adding that its lyrical content ultimately elevates the material.

== Track listing ==
All tracks are written by Alexandra Drewchin and Dave Sitek, except "Malka Moma" (written with Neli Andreeva) and "Nova" (written with Michael Andrews, Jason Won Chung, Shahzad Ismaily, Casey Manierka-Quaile, and Nova Perkins).

Heavenly Body: If I'm the Bottle You're the Message track listing
No.	Title	Length
1.	"Malka Moma"	3:14
2.	"Paradise Rains"	3:19
3.	"Practical Amnesia"	3:46
4.	"Crown Jewel"	4:01
5.	"Wasp in the Fig"	3:42
6.	"Glowing Guts"	2:05
7.	"Hers Before Hers"	3:26
8.	"Don't Look Back"	3:05
9.	"Favorite"	4:45
10.	"Fast Asleep" (featuring Oklou)	2:53
11.	"Nova"	5:55
Total length:		40:16

== Personnel ==
Credits are adapted from Tidal.

- Alex Drewchin – vocals, production
- Dave Sitek – production
- Nosaj Thing – production (track 11)
- Michael Andrews – co-production (11)
- Ciel – engineering
- Dash Hammerstein – engineering (4)
- Erin Tonkon – engineering (10)
- Matthew Green – mixing (1–10)
- Gabe Schuman – mixing (11)
- Dale Becker – mastering
- Esperé Eckard-Lee – cello (1, 2); arrangement, violin (1); viola (2)
- Scarlett Perry – additional vocals (3)
- Chanse Eckard-Lee – cello (8)
- Sage Eckard-Lee – viola (8)
- Shahzad Ismaily – bass (11)
- Casey MQ – piano (11)

== Charts ==
Chart performance for Heavenly Body: If I'm the Bottle You're the Message
Chart (2026)	Peak position
French Physical Albums (SNEP)	189
