= Natalie Chami =

Lebanese-American electronic musician

- Also known as: TALsounds
- Born: Windsor, Ontario, Canada
- Origin: Chicago, Illinois, US
- Genres: electronic; ambient
- Years active: 2009–present
- Formerly of: Good Willsmith, L'eterebre
- Website: www.talsounds.com

Natalie Chami (born January 27, 1987), known professionally as TALsounds, is a Lebanese-American musician, vocalist, composer, and educator. She is also a member of experimental band Good Willsmith.

== Early life ==
Natalie Chami was born in Windsor, Ontario, on January 27, 1987. At the age of ten, she relocated to Falls Church, Virginia along with her mother and stepfather. In 2005, shortly after graduating high school, she moved to Evanston, Illinois to attend Northwestern University. At age twenty-three, Chami became an American citizen.

== Career ==
=== Musical career ===
Chami began recording music as TALsounds in 2009. In late 2010, she formed ambient project L'eterebre with bassist Brian Griffith. The duo secured a residency at Chicago bar Rodan, and released a self-titled cassette via Plustapes in 2011.

Following a solo performance at Rodan, Chami was invited by Doug Kaplan and Maxwell Allison to join their newly-formed experimental band, Good Willsmith. In 2012, Allison and Kaplan founded Hausu Mountain, an independent record label that would release both the band's music as well as Chami's solo work. In 2015, she released her debut solo album All The Way through the label. In July 2016, Chami ended a Good Willsmith tour early, later stating that the band had "essentially been on hiatus since then." In 2018 the band released their third LP, Exit Future Heart, a collaboration with Dustin Wong and Takako Minekawa, via record label Umor Rex and in 2021 HausLive 2: Good Willsmith at Sleeping Village, 4/25/2019.

In October 2016, Chami released her second full-length solo album, Lifter + Lighter, via Hausu Mountain. Fact ranked the album the fourth-best Bandcamp release of the year, while Vice named the record the thirteenth-best experimental album of the year. The Quietus editor Tristan Bath listed the album among his top ten cassette releases of 2016, describing it as Chami's "most focused to date."

In May 2020, Chami released her solo album Acquiesce via NNA Tapes. The album received positive reviews, being rated 7.6 out of 10 by Pitchfork, 7 out of 10 by Exclaim!, and 8 out of 10 by PopMatters.

In 2021, Chami was commissioned to create a 20-minute spatialized sound work for the Sonic Pavilion Festival, a series of 30-channel sound installations presented at Millennium Park’s Pritzker Pavilion. Her piece was featured as part of an immersive overhead speaker array curated by Experimental Sound Studio and the City of Chicago’s Department of Cultural Affairs and Special Events.

Chami is also a member of the ambient duo Damiana, alongside musician Whitney Johnson. In July 2021, the duo released their debut album, Vines, via Hausu Mountain.

In November 2023, Chami released Shift via NNA Tapes. The Skinny writer Joe Creely rated the album four out of five stars, describing it as "a beautiful record."

In August 2024, Chami was slated to perform at the ninth annual Wonderment festival in Victoria, British Columbia.

She has also collaborated with Chicago-based electronic composer Brett Naucke.

=== Teaching ===
In 2009, Chami became a founding faculty member and music teacher at the Chicago High School for the Arts. Among her students was R&B singer Ravyn Lenae.

== Musical style and influences ==
Chami has cited Beethoven, Chopin, Duke Ellington, and Björk as influences. Her music has been compared to Björk, The Knife, Laurie Anderson, and Beverly Glenn-Copeland.

== Discography ==
=== Studio albums ===
- Shift (NNA Tapes, 2023)
- Acquiesce (NNA Tapes, 2020)
- Love Sick (Ba Da Bing! Records, 2017)
- Lifter + Lighter (Hausu Mountain, 2016)
- All The Way (Hausu Mountain, 2015)
