= Spelling (disambiguation) =

Spelling is the writing of words with all necessary letters and diacritics present in an accepted, conventional order.

Spelling or Spellings is the name of:

- Aaron Spelling (1923–2006), American film and television producer
- Candy Spelling (born 1945), author, socialite, widow of Aaron Spelling
- Randy Spelling (born 1978), American actor
- Margaret Spellings (born 1957), United States Secretary of Education from 2005–2009
- Tori Spelling (born 1973), American actress

== See also ==
- Spell (disambiguation)
- Orthography
- Letter (alphabet)
- Spellling, the project of American musician Chrystia Cabral (born 1991)
