= Wave to Make Friends =

Studio album by the Comas
- Released: July 6, 1999
- Genre: Indie rock
- Length: 45:00
- Label: Plastique

The Comas chronology
Wave to Make Friends (1999)	A Def Needle in Tomorrow (2000)

Wave to Make Friends is the first full-length album by the American indie rock band the Comas, released in 1999.

== Critical reception ==
Professional ratings
Review scores
Source	Rating
AllMusic	3/5 stars

The New York Times included the album on its list of "Favorite CD's You Nearly Missed", writing that "the Comas write slow, haunting pop reminiscent of Yo La Tengo."

== Track listing ==
1. Tears for Trixie
2. Sparrowheaded Man
3. 16mm
4. Fainter
5. B to Chloe
6. Victoria
7. Execution Style
8. Naked Cowboys
9. Broken Camel
