= Powders (album) =

Studio album by Eartheater
- Released: September 20, 2023
- Studios: Sunset Sound, Hollywood, California, United States
- Genres: Experimental; trip hop
- Length: 34:03
- Language: English
- Labels: Chemical X; Mad Decent
- Producers: Casey MQ; Eartheater; Elliott Kozel; Yves Rothman; Sega Bodega; Tony Seltzer; Lecx Stacy; Kiri Stensby; Swaya

Eartheater chronology
Phoenix: Flames Are Dew Upon My Skin (2020)	Powders (2023)	Heavenly Body: If I'm the Bottle You're the Message (2026)

Singles from Powders
- 1. "Pure Smile Snake Venom" Released: August 23, 2023; 2. "Chop Suey" Released: September 14, 2023; 3. "Crushing" Released: September 23, 2023

“Initially, I had rules set for Aftermath, my next album, but the songs on Powders unfolded in their own accord. I had absolutely no rules with Powders. The songs chose me—I didn’t choose them.”

— Eartheater on recording two albums simultaneously.

Powders is the fifth studio album by American experimental musician Eartheater. It was released September 20, 2023, via Chemical X under exclusive license to Mad Decent. It is a sister album to the upcoming album titled Aftermath.

It was supported by the singles "Pure Smile Snake Venom" and "Chop Suey". The former single and "Crushing" feature music videos directed by Daniel Sannwald and Andrew Thomas Huang, respectively.

== Reception ==
Online retailer Bandcamp spotlighted Powders as Album of the Day, with critic Andrew Parks writing that the music "finds much of its power in minimalism and making every last sound count" and that it is "an incredibly cohesive listen despite its moving parts and myriad co-producers". In The Fader, Raphael Helfand called the cover of System of a Down's "Chop Suey!" "tranquil" and wrote that it does the song justice. The Line of Best Fit's Callum Foulds rated Powders a 9 out of 10, writing that the album "displays Eartheater’s talents for creating worlds of hyper-saturated textures and sounds" and is "is another masterwork and continues her steady ascension". Colin Lodewick of Pitchfork scored Powders a 7.5 out of 10, calling it a "radiant new album [that] explores love’s rapture within the confines of more traditional pop structures" and praising Eartheater's voice but criticizing that the structure of some songs holds back her singing. At that same site, Peyton Toups gave a positive review to "Crushing", calling it "a calming sea of trip-hop". Online streaming service Tidal published a spotlight on this album, with Gabriel Szatan calling the music a set "driven by a rhythmic pulse, with textural accents that twist like curlicues of smoke into inky air", with "more concentrated guitarwork than has ever been heard on a record of" Eartheater's. Editors at Clash Music listed this the 43rd best albums of the year.

== Powders Tour ==
To promote the album, Eartheater embarked on the 11-date 'Powders Tour' across Europe and North America in late 2023. The next year, she announced a second leg of the tour called 'Spring Summer Tour' which included shows at Coachella in California and Primavera Sound in Barcelona. She also announced three shows in Oceania as the last leg of the tour.

== Track listing ==
No.	Title	Writer(s)	Producer(s)	Length
1.	"Sugarcane Switch"	Alexandra Drewchin; Elliott Kozel; Casey Manierka-Quaile	Eartheater; Kozel; Casey MQ	4:10
2.	"Crushing"	Drewchin	Eartheater	4:10
3.	"Face in the Moon"	Drewchin; Yves Rothman	Eartheater; Rothman	4:45
4.	"Clean Break"	Drewchin; Manierka-Quaile; Alecx Avelino Omo	Eartheater; Casey MQ; Lecx Stacy; Kiri	3:09
5.	"Chop Suey"	Daron Malakian; Serj Tankian	Eartheater; Kiri	4:02
6.	"Heels over Head"	Drewchin; Antonio Felipe Hernandez; Sawaya Sophie Macarthur	Eartheater; Tony Seltzer; Swaya	3:07
7.	"Mona Lisa Moan"	Samuel Burgess; Drewchin; Kiri Stensby	Eartheater; Sammy; Kiri; Rothman	3:27
8.	"Pure Smile Snake Venom"	Drewchin; Salvador Navarrete	Eartheater; Sega Bodega	3:41
9.	"Salt of the Earth (H2ome)"	Drewchin	Eartheater	3:09
Total length:				34:03

== Personnel ==
- Eartheater – instrumentation, vocals, production
- Luis Aponte – drums on "Chop Suey"
- Ben Babbitt – mixing on "Salt of the Earth (H2ome)"
- Isaiah Barr – bass guitar on "Chop Suey"
- Silas Drewchin – guitar on "Salt of the Earth (H2ome)"
- Hannah Khymych – photography
- Elliott Kozel – production on "Sugarcane Switch"
- Joe LaPorta – mastering
- Lolahol – backing vocals on "Mona Lisa Moan"
- Sawaya Sophie Macarthur – production on "Heels over Head"
- Casey Manierka-Quaile – production on "Sugarcane Switch" and "Clean Break"
- Mom – violin on "Salt of the Earth (H2ome)"
- Kayla Reagan – mixing on "Face in the Moon"
- Yves Rothman – production on "Face in the Moon" and "Mona Lisa Moan", additional production on "Clean Break"
- Gabriel Schuman – mixing on "Sugarcane Switch", "Clean Break", "Chop Suey", "Mona Lisa Moan", and "Pure Smile Snake Venom"
- Sega Bodega – production on "Pure Smile Snake Venom"
- Tony Seltzer – production on "Heels over Head"
- Lecx Stacy – production on "Clean Break"
- Kiri Stensby – production on "Clean Break", "Chop Suey", and "Mona Lisa Moan", mixing on "Sugarcane Switch", "Clean Break", "Chop Suey", and "Mona Lisa Moan"
- Alonzo Vargas – mixing on "Crushing" and "Heels over Head"
- Christian Velasquez – art direction
