= A Def Needle in Tomorrow =

Studio album by the Comas
- Released: October 3, 2000
- Genre: Indie rock
- Label: Yep Roc
- Producer: Brian Paulson

The Comas chronology
Wave to Make Friends (1999)	A Def Needle in Tomorrow (2000)	Conductor (2004)

Professional ratings
Review scores
Source	Rating
AllMusic	3/5 stars

A Def Needle In Tomorrow is the second album from the American indie rock band the Comas. It was released in 2000 via Yep Roc Records.

== Production ==
The album was produced by Brian Paulson.

== Critical reception ==
Indy Week wrote that the band's "cloudy, creamy, country-tinged dreampop—with violin by ... Margaret White, a strong female vocal presence, and a drummer toying with a sampler—stood out from the masculine rock energy that still pervaded Chapel Hill." The Morning Star wrote that the Comas' "songs are awash in beautiful, hazy melodies, layers of guitar, keyboard fills and the sly, thin vocals of frontman Andy Herod." PopMatters thought that it "hinted at greatness, even if it didn't always deliver."

== Track listing ==
All songs written by Andrew Herod.

No.	Title	Length
1.	"Arena"
2.	"Tiger in a Tower"
3.	"Wicked Elm"
4.	"All Over the School"
5.	"Rancor"
6.	"Sweet Sweet 69"
7.	"Tired"
8.	"Sister Brewerton"
9.	"Centipedes"
10.	"Free Burritos"
11.	"Pa Mac"

== Personnel ==
- Laird Dixon - Guitar
- Nicole Gehweiler - Guitar, Keyboards, Photography, Vocals
- John Harrison - Drums, Sampling, Turntables
- Andrew Herod - Casio, Drawing, Guitar, Vocals
- Margaret White Bass, Violin, Vocals
