= Heaven to a Tortured Mind =

Studio album by Yves Tumor
- Released: April 3, 2020
- Studios: Kaiku Studios; Paulie's Kro East Studios; Saturn Sound; Press Play Studios
- Genres: Rock; glam rock; psychedelic soul
- Length: 36:22
- Label: Warp
- Producers: Justin Raisen; Mahssa Taghinia; Yves Tumor

Yves Tumor chronology
Safe in the Hands of Love (2018)	Heaven to a Tortured Mind (2020)	The Asymptotical World (2021)

Singles from Heaven to a Tortured Mind
- 1. "Gospel for a New Century" Released: February 18, 2020; 2. "Kerosene!" Released: March 9, 2020; 3. "Romanticist / Dream Palette" Released: March 19, 2020

Heaven to a Tortured Mind is the fourth studio album by American experimental electronic artist Yves Tumor, released on April 3, 2020.

== Background ==
The album was announced alongside the release of the single "Gospel for a New Century" on February 18, 2020. Two more singles followed, "Kerosene!" which was released on March 9, 2020, and "Romanticist / Dream Palette", which was released March 31, 2020.

== Critical reception ==
Professional ratings
Aggregate scores
Source	Rating
AnyDecentMusic?	8.2/10
Metacritic	88/100
Review scores
Source	Rating
AllMusic	5/5 stars
Clash	8/10
Exclaim!	9/10
The Guardian	4/5 stars
Paste	9.0/10
Pitchfork	8.5/10
PopMatters	9/10
Q	4/5 stars
The Skinny	5/5 stars
The Times	4/5 stars

Heaven to a Tortured Mind received widespread acclaim from music critics. At Metacritic, which assigns a normalized rating out of 100 to reviews from mainstream critics, the album has an average score of 88 based on 18 reviews, indicating "universal acclaim". AllMusic critic Heather Phares praised the record, describing it as "an album that suggests the easiest way to define Tumor is as an artist who consistently outdoes themself." Eero Holi of Clash labeled the album as a "psychedelic soul record for the 21st century," further stating: "It’s so heart-rending you could keep yourself wrapped inside its comfort for hours and not come out." Kaelen Bell of Exclaim! characterized the music as "the sound of a new kind of warped pop star — an artist capable of weaving the unending unknown of space and the throb of blood and skin, willing to take us and destroy us and create something wholly new from what remains."

Alexis Petridis of The Guardian thought that the record "sounds coherent" and "is punchy and concise;" Petridis further remarked that "its stylistic leaps and short-circuits always feel intended – the product of someone operating to their own internal logic rather than randomly throwing ideas at the wall." Paste critic Austin Jones praised the record, stating: "The record, with all its idiosyncrasies, will be remembered as a definitive piece by one of our era’s most important rock icons—a pop star as transgressive and rule-breaking as the legends of the ’70s and ’80s we take for granted now." Pitchfork's Kevin Lozano considered Tumor's commercial ambition, writing: "The product of this ambition is a gratifying and intense record, one whose pleasures are viscerally immediate." Reviewing for PopMatters, Paul Carr noted: "Whereas on previous albums, he would obscure himself behind the music, here he steps out of his sonic chrysalis, dons some shiny black wings and soars." Q's Leonie Cooper likewise noted the album's "relatively straight-up approach", dubbing it "sleazy listening at its best".

=== Accolades ===
Accolades for Heaven to a Tortured Mind
Publication	Accolade	Rank	Ref.
Beats Per Minute	Top 50 Albums of 2020	13	
Consequence of Sound	Top 50 Albums of 2020	17	
Crack Magazine	Top 50 Albums of 2020	4	
Exclaim!	Top 50 Best Albums of 2020	8	
The Line of Best Fit	Top 50 Albums of 2020	8	
Paste	Paste's 25 Best Albums of 2020 – Mid-Year	12	
Paste	The 50 Best Albums of 2020	20	
Paste	The 100 Best Albums of the 2020s So Far	40	
Pitchfork	The 50 Best Albums of 2020	7	
Pitchfork	The 100 Best Albums of the 2020s So Far	42	
PopMatters	The 60 Best Albums of 2020	5	
The Skinny	Top 10 Albums of 2020	4	
Stereogum	Stereogum's 50 Best Albums of 2020 – Mid-Year	9	
Stereogum	The 50 Best Albums of 2020	13	
Under the Radar	Top 100 Albums of 2020	19	
Uproxx	The Best Albums and Songs of 2020	17	

== Track listing ==
All tracks are written by Yves Tumor, except where noted.

Heaven to a Tortured Mind track listing
No.	Title	Writer(s)	Length
1.	"Gospel for a New Century"		3:18
2.	"Medicine Burn"		4:04
3.	"Identity Trade"		1:59
4.	"Kerosene!"	Yves Tumor, Jeremiah Raisen	5:05
5.	"Hasdallen Lights"		2:07
6.	"Romanticist"		1:46
7.	"Dream Palette"		2:55
8.	"Super Stars"	Yves Tumor, Hirakish	3:05
9.	"Folie Imposée"		3:05
10.	"Strawberry Privilege"		3:52
11.	"Asteroid Blues"		2:02
12.	"A Greater Love"	Yves Tumor, Clara La San, Hirakish	3:04
Total length:			36:22

Japanese bonus track
No.	Title	Length
13.	"Folie Simultanée"	3:28
Total length:		39:50

Sample credits

- "Gospel for New Century" contains elements from "이송아," performed by Lee Son Ga
- "Kerosene" contains elements from "Weep in Silence," written by Ken Hensley and John Wetton
- "Romanticist" contains elements from "김남미 - 오! 그말," performed by Kim Nam Mi; and the composition "Hangman," written by Roy Harper and Jimmy Page
- "Dream Palette" contains elements from "A Love That's Worth Having," written and performed by Willie Hutch
- "Super Stars" contains elements from the composition "Three Piece Suit," written by Robert Webb, Martin Henderson, and Frank Holland
- “Asteroid Blues” contains a sample from the 1998 PlayStation game Metal Gear Solid

== Personnel ==
Album personnel adapted from Bandcamp liner notes.

- Yves Tumor – vocals, writer, composer, performer, producer
- Hirakish – vocals (8, 12)
- Pan Daijing – additional vocals (1)
- Diana Gordon – additional vocals (4)
- Kelsey Lu – additional vocals (6)
- Julia Cumming – additional vocals (7, 10)
- Clara La San – additional vocals (12)
- Yves Rothman – synthesizer (4, 6, 8), bass guitar (5), additional programming (1, 4–8, 10), co-producer, engineer, editor
- Joe Kennedy – guitar (1, 4, 8), bass guitar (4, 7, 11, 12), organ (4, 8), drum machine (6), synth (6, 8, 12), Mellotron (12)
- Heavy Mellow – guitar (1, 4, 6, 8, 12)
- Andreas Emanuel – guitar (3, 9, 12)
- Kenny Gilmore – guitar (2, 6), synth (2)
- Andy Ramsay – guitar (1), drums (1), effects (1)
- Gina Ramirez – bass guitar (1–3, 6–8)
- Henry Schiff – drums (1, 3, 4, 6–8, 11, 12)
- Sylvain Carton – tenor saxophone, baritone saxophone, flute, clarinet (1, 3)

=== Production ===
- Justin Raisen – executive producer, engineer, synth (2, 8, 12), additional drums (10)
- Mahssa Taghinia – executive producer
- Anthony Paul Lopez – engineer, drums (10)
- Ben Zelico – editor
- Collin Dupuis – mixing
- Mike Bozzi – mastering

== Charts ==
Sales chart performance for Heaven to a Tortured Mind
Chart (2020)	Peak position
Belgian Albums (Ultratop Flanders)	170
Scottish Albums (Official Charts)	38
