= The Drought (Puce Mary album) =

Studio album by Puce Mary
- Released: 5 October 2018
- Genre: Industrial; noise; power electronics
- Length: 44:13
- Label: PAN
- Producer: Frederikke Hoffmeier

Puce Mary chronology
The Spiral (2016)	The Drought (2018)

Singles from The Drought
- 1. "Red Desert" Released: August 2018

The Drought is the fourth full-length album by Danish experimental musician and composer Frederikke Hoffmeier under the moniker Puce Mary. It was released on 5 October 2018 by Berlin-based record label, PAN. The first and only single from the album, "Red Desert", was released in August 2018.

== Background and music ==
The music on The Drought was described as noise and industrial music and incorporates soundtrack dynamics. According to Pitchfork's Daniel Martin-McCormick, the album, while rooted in industrial and power electronics genres, eschews these genres' "stereotypical displays of machismo and fetishistic celebrations of strength." Similarly, Bob Cluness of The Quietus stated that "uses genre motifs of noise and industrial music not so much to bombard the listener with adolescent fantasies of power, transgression and provocation, but instead to look at such violence as possessing empathy based on action and transformation."

Hoffmeier has stated that during the recording sessions for The Drought, she exerted a particular emphasis on the sound editing process. According to the press release, the record "demonstrates an intention to expand on the vocabulary of confrontational music and into a grander narrative defined by technical and emotional growth." Hoffmeier has cited the works of Charles Baudelaire and Jean Genet as influences on the album.

The cover art was created by Norwegian photographer Torbjørn Rødland in 2006. The track "Red Desert" was named after the 1964 film of the same name by Michelangelo Antonioni.

== Critical reception ==
Professional ratings
Aggregate scores
Source	Rating
Metacritic	81/100
Review scores
Source	Rating
Exclaim!	9/10
Pitchfork	7.2/10

The Drought has received generally positive reviews. At Metacritic, which assigns a normalized rating out of 100 to reviews from mainstream critics, the album has an average score of 81 based on 5 reviews, indicating "universal acclaim". Exclaim! critic Tom Beedham has described the record as a "thoroughly traumatizing noise horror", and further stated that "it's hard to imagine a more terrifying album to come this year." Daniel Martin-McCormick of Pitchfork thought that Hoffmeier's voice "brings The Drought together, giving the album a sense of movement and purpose beyond a set of well-executed mood pieces." Martin-McCormick additionally considered the record as a "cinematic take on noise".

Resident Advisor's Marc Masters wrote that The Drought "deftly navigates unpredictable freedom and domineering control," regarding it to "be compelling because Hoffmeier is so clearly in charge." Writing for The Quietus, Bob Cluness described the record as "her strongest album to date and one where "noise" is but a tool towards a much more expansive expression of music."

== Track listing ==
1. "Dissolve" — 2:30
2. "A Feast Before the Drought" — 6:44
3. "To Possess Is to Be in Control" — 5:31
4. "Fragments of a Lily" — 4:21
5. "Red Desert" — 3:23
6. "Coagulate" — 2:55
7. "The Size of Our Desires" — 7:21
8. "The Transformation" — 6:47
9. "Slouching Uphill" — 4:41

== Personnel ==
- Frederikke Hoffmeier — performer, mixing
- Sewer Election — recording, noise (3)
- David Wojnarowicz — lyrics (3)
- Rashad Becker — mastering
- Torbjørn Rødland — cover art
- Bill Kouligas — layout
