= The Asymptotical World =

The Asymptotical World EP

EP by Yves Tumor
- Released: July 15, 2021
- Genre: Experimental rock; nu gaze
- Label: Warp
- Producer: Yves Tumor; Chris Greatti; Yves Rothman

Yves Tumor chronology
Heaven to a Tortured Mind (2020)	The Asymptotical World EP (2021)	Praise a Lord Who Chews but Which Does Not Consume; (Or Simply, Hot Between Worlds) (2023)

Singles from The Asymptotical World EP
- 1. "Jackie" Released: June 15, 2021

The Asymptotical World EP is an EP by experimental musician Yves Tumor, released by Warp on July 15, 2021. It follows on the heels of their acclaimed 2020 album Heaven to a Tortured Mind.

The EP was recorded and produced alongside longtime collaborator Yves Rothman, as well as a new partner in multi-instrumentalist Chris Greatti. Musically, it dives deeper into their experimental rock tendencies, as well as the glam-infused sounds of its predecessor.

== Composition ==
The EP's songs take on nu gaze and shoegazing sounds, as well as pulling from 2000s alternative music, dream pop, glam rock and goth rock. It has also been noted for pushing forward in Tumor's experimental rock and donning "maximalist neo-psychedelic texture". It is also seen as an "artful" fusion of industrial music and nu metal.

Opener "Jackie" digs into "heat-sick" psychedelic rock, being compared to the work of duo A.R. Kane and quartet My Bloody Valentine. "Rip-roaring" pop-punk kicks in on "Crushed Velvet". The hypnagogic pop of "Secrecy..." leads into a "Prince-meets-Ariel Pink scenario" and features a "post-punk bass throb".

== Critical reception ==
Professional ratings
Review scores
Source	Rating
Loud and Quiet	9/10
Pitchfork	7.8/10

Upon its release, The Asympototical World was welcomed with mostly positive reviews. Emeka Okonkwo for Resident Advisor called it "dazzling" and its songs "emotional, out-of-this-world love songs".

== Track listing ==
All tracks are written by Sean Bowie, except where noted

No.	Title	Writer(s)	Length
1.	"Jackie"	Bowie; Chris Greatti	2:56
2.	"Crushed Velvet"		3:17
3.	"Secrecy Is Incredibly Important to the Both of Them"		3:52
4.	"Tuck" (featuring Naked)	Bowie; Agnes Gryczkowska (lyrics)	2:42
5.	"...And Loyalty Is a Nuisance Child"		2:13
6.	"Katrina"		3:19

== Personnel ==
All credits adapted from the EP's credits website.

- Yves Tumor – arranging (all songs), additional synth (1), drums (1, 6), drum programming (2, 3, 5), Mellotron strings (5), bass (5, 6), "rattlesnake" (6)

Additional musicians

- Asher Bank – drums (1, 2, 6)
- Brad Bowers – bass (2, 6)
- Andreas Emmanuel – guitar (3)
- Henry Finds – drums (5)
- Chris Greatti – arranging (1, 2, 5), bass (1, 4), guitar (1–3, 5, 6), Mellotron (1), Juno-106 (3), Mellotron strings (5)
- Agnes Gryczkowska – arranging (4), vocals (4)
- Frank James – additional percussion (4)
- Simon and Elliot Kozel – additional sound effects/vibes (6)
- Yves Rothman – arranging (1, 2), drum programming (1, 2, 5), Mini Moog (1)

Technical

- Sean Bowie – production
- Collin Dupuis – mixing at Center for Pleasure Mechanics
- Chris Greatti – production (1–4, 6)
- Emily Lazar and Chris Allgood – mastering at The Lodge, NY
- Yves Rothman – production

Artwork and design

- Collin Fletcher – art direction, design
- Paul Kooiker – photography
- Lisa Signorini – illustration

Other

- Brian McPherson – legal
- Mahssa Taghinia – management
