= Metalepsis (album) =

- Original release cover, a 2019 re-release features a photo of a woman eating dolls

Studio album by Eartheater
- Released: February 24, 2015
- Recorded: 2014
- Studio: Eartheater's home studio
- Genre: Electroacoustic; freak folk
- Length: 34:16
- Language: English
- Label: Hausu Mountain
- Producer: Alexandra Drewchin

Eartheater chronology
Metalepsis (2015)	RIP Chrysalis (2015)

Singles from Metalepsis
- 1. "Infinity" Released: January 25, 2013

Metalepsis is the debut studio album by American electronic musician Eartheater. It was released through Hausu Mountain on February 24, 2015. The album has received positive reviews from critics.

== Reception ==
Professional ratings
Review scores
Source	Rating
AllMusic	3.5/5 stars
Pitchfork	7.5/10
TinyMixTapes	4/5 stars

Editors at AllMusic rated this album 3.5 out of 5 stars, with critic Paul Simpson writing that this release addresses "spirituality, nature, and the internet through a fragmentary mixture of electro-acoustic freak-folk". Online music platform Bandcamp highlighted Metalepsis as Album of the Day and writer Miles Bowe remarked that the "most abstract moments are also its most resonant in hindsight with "weightless, insular soundscapes [that] connect the album’s brightest moments, making them feel like extraterrestrial encounters". Writing for Pitchfork, Colin Joyce rated this album 7.5 out of 10, calling it "a vision of psychedelic music that embraces both conventional folk elements and stranger experimentation". Pat Beane of TinyMixTapes rated Metalepsis 4 out of 5, writing that "many of these songs are covered in and born of the textural strains of Drewchin’s voice and electronics" and the album hinges on what breaks down and what persists; its deviations and pulses are Drewchin showing her hand, the hand that puts a head inside a head".

== Track listing ==
All songs written by Alexandra Drewchin.

1. "MacroEV" – 3:26
2. "Homonyms" – 4:06
3. "The Internet Is Handmade" – 3:36
4. "Put a Head in a Head" – 2:29
5. "Youniverse" – 2:11
6. "View Point Strata" – 1:13
7. "Sigil Life" – 2:36
8. "Orbit" – 10:30
9. "Infinity" – 4:09

10th Anniversary Edition

10. "8" – 4:51

== Personnel ==
- Eartheater – instrumentation, vocals, recording, production, design, cover on re-release
- Maxwell Allison – design
- Chris Carlone – on re-release
- Markus S. Fiedler – logo on re-release
- Doug Kaplan – additional mixing
- Patrick Klem – mastering
- Mr. Doug Doug – on "Orbit"

== See also ==
- List of 2015 albums
