= Dizzy Spells =

Dizzy Spells may refer to:

- "Dizzy Spells" (song), a song by Benny Goodman, Lionel Hampton, and Teddy Wilson
- Dizzy Spells (album), a 2001 album by Dutch anarchist band The Ex
