= Praise a Lord Who Chews but Which Does Not Consume =

Praise a Lord Who Chews but Which Does Not Consume; (Or Simply, Hot Between Worlds)

Studio album by Yves Tumor
- Released: March 17, 2023
- Genres: Indie rock; post-punk; alternative dance; indie pop; electronica; psychedelic rock
- Length: 37:29
- Label: Warp
- Producers: Sean Lee Bowie; Noah Goldstein; Simon Christensen; Elliott Kozel; Dylan Wiggins

Yves Tumor chronology
The Asymptotical World (2021)	Praise a Lord Who Chews but Which Does Not Consume; (Or Simply, Hot Between Worlds) (2023)

Singles from Praise a Lord Who Chews...
- 1. "God Is a Circle" Released: November 3, 2022; 2. "Echolalia" Released: January 30, 2023; 3. "Heaven Surrounds Us Like a Hood" Released: February 28, 2023; 4. "Parody" Released: March 15, 2023

Praise a Lord Who Chews but Which Does Not Consume; (Or Simply, Hot Between Worlds), sometimes shortened as Praise a Lord Who Chews…, is the fifth studio album by American experimental electronic artist Yves Tumor. It was released on March 17, 2023, through Warp.

== Background ==
Yves Tumor released the album's first single, "God is a Circle", on November 2, 2022, alongside a music video. On January 30, 2023, they announced the album's title, release date, and track listing. On the same day, they released the album's second single, "Echolalia", alongside a music video. They also announced the To Spite or Not to Spite Tour to support the album, starting on April 4, 2023, in Indio, California, and ending on November 27, 2023, in Dublin, Ireland, with Pretty Sick, Frost Children, Izzy Spears, Evanora Unlimited, and Nation. On February 28, 2023, they released the album's third single, "Heaven Surrounds Us Like a Hood", alongside a music video. On March 15, 2023, the album's fourth single was released, titled "Parody".

== Critical reception ==
Professional ratings
Aggregate scores
Source	Rating
AnyDecentMusic?	7.8/10
Metacritic	86/100
Review scores
Source	Rating
AllMusic	4/5 stars
DIY	4.5/5 stars
The Guardian	4/5 stars
Loud and Quiet	8/10
NME	4/5 stars
Paste	8.4/10
Pitchfork	8.4/10
The Skinny	4/5 stars
Slant Magazine	4/5 stars
Under the Radar	8/10

According to the review aggregator Metacritic, Praise a Lord Who Chews... received "universal acclaim" based on a weighted average score of 86 out of 100 from 19 critic scores. Aggregator AnyDecentMusic? gave it 7.9 out of 10, based on their assessment of the critical consensus.

The album received praise for its diverse production. Writing for Northern Transmissions, Otis Cohan Mone writes: "Ranging from post-punk and alternative dance to hard rock along with a light touch of heavy metal territory, Yves Tumor still does not leave you with any exact definition of the genre of their songs, continuing to hone and improve their stubborn skill to make their tracks both precise and incomprehensible at the same time." Ammar Kalia of Crack writes that the album is "ultimately Yves Tumor's take on pop – a deliciously compressed offering harnessing their irrepressible energy; 12 infectious tracks that leave you wanting more." Erica Campbell of NME states: "Tumor makes rock music in the way the counterculture movement the music grew out of is known for, with a focus on creativity, invention, and generating sounds that blast away expectations. With their latest album, ... the experimental producer and songwriter transcends even further, dipping into electronica, alt-pop and punk territory and landing on a collection of songs that are equally bizarre and delightful." Exclaim!'s Allie Gregory writes: "Bewildering and disparate influences merge to form an agitation of genre, from the twinkles of Halifaxa-era witch house and Strokes-indebted bass notes on the glistening "Lovely Sewer," to the P.O.D.- and Incubus-inspired aughts rock of "Meteora Blues" [...] and the outright indie sleaze of "Operator.""

The album received praise for its lyrics. Luke Cartledge of Loud and Quiet described the lyrics as "expertly meld[ing] romance, reflection, queerness and candour". Consequence's Wren Graves writes that "the lyrics reward multiple listens, even as the melody is sticky enough to stay with you after a single time through." NPR's Anupa Mistry writes: "There are hierarchies of gender, race, desire (as in needs, but also romance) and performance that Yves Tumor's music disrupts through its intense magnification and worship of life, death and spirituality. Praise A Lord could be heard as a thesis statement, the cohering of ideas, but I think its function is in breaking things apart." Alisdair Grice of DIY writes: "Their blunt, affecting lyrics on 'Praise A Lord...' separates them from other leftfield pop acts, somehow creating grounding, brutal love songs amid the flurry of dance-pop and industrial noise."

The AllMusic review concludes: "At once challenging and inviting, Praise a Lord Who Chews ... is another dazzling work from a creative whirlwind."

In June 2023, Alternative Press published an unranked list of the top 25 albums of the year to date and included this release, calling it "a sheer pop thrill" that is "intoxicating, empowering you to relinquish yourself to the music completely and, primarily, feel just as free as the boundary-defying extraterrestrial behind the microphone".

=== Accolades ===
Publication	Accolade	Rank	Ref.
Alternative Press	25 best albums of 2023 so far	—N/a	
Autostraddle	10 of the Best Queer Albums of 2023	—N/a	
Beats Per Minute	Top 50 Albums of 2023	16	
BrooklynVegan	Our 40 Favorite Albums of 2023 So Far	—N/a	
Consequence	The 50 Best Albums of 2023	1	
The Fader	The 50 Best Albums of 2023	12	
The Guardian	The 50 best albums of 2023	16	
KCRW	The 23 Best Albums of 2023	16	
Loud And Quiet	Albums of the Year 2023	8	
NME	The 50 best albums of 2023	17	
Paste	The 50 Best Albums of 2023	21	
Pitchfork	The 50 Best Albums of 2023	31	
Pitchfork	The 37 Best Rock Albums of 2023	—N/a	
Resident Advisor	The Best Albums of 2023	—N/a	
Rolling Stone	The 100 Best Albums of 2023	87	
Stereogum	The 50 Best Albums Of 2023	32	
Slant Magazine	The 50 Best Albums of 2023	27	
Under the Radar	Top 100 Albums of 2023	78	
Uproxx	The Best Albums Of 2023	—N/a	
Vulture	The Best Albums of 2023	4	

== Track listing ==
All tracks are written by Sean Lee Bowie and Noah Goldstein, with additional writers noted.

Praise a Lord Who Chews... track listing
No.	Title	Writer(s)	Producer(s)	Length
1.	"God Is a Circle"	Chris Greatti; Alexander Bazzi	Bowie; Goldstein	3:32
2.	"Lovely Sewer"	Elliott Kozel; Simon Christensen	Bowie; Goldstein; Simon Christensen; Elliott Kozel	3:15
3.	"Meteora Blues"	Kozel; Christensen	Bowie; Goldstein; Christensen; Kozel	3:47
4.	"Interlude"	John Carroll Kirby; The Samples	Goldstein	0:52
5.	"Parody"	Kozel; Bazzi	Bowie; Goldstein	3:06
6.	"Heaven Surrounds Us Like a Hood"	Kozel; Christensen; Dylan Wiggins; Jake Miller	Bowie; Goldstein; Christensen; Kozel; Dylan Wiggins	4:06
7.	"Operator"	Kozel; Christensen; Bazzi; Frank Nadolny	Bowie; Goldstein; Christensen; Kozel	3:16
8.	"In Spite of War"	Kozel; Christensen	Bowie; Goldstein; Christensen; Kozel	2:31
9.	"Echolalia"	Kozel; Christensen; Miller	Bowie; Goldstein; Kozel	3:00
10.	"Fear Evil Like Fire"	Kozel; Christensen; Miller; Sasha Desree	Bowie; Goldstein; Kozel	3:30
11.	"Purified by the Fire"	Kozel; Christensen; Miller; Ian Evans	Bowie; Goldstein; Christensen; Kozel	3:13
12.	"Ebony Eye"	Kirby; Wiggins; Miller; The Samples	Bowie; Goldstein; Wiggins	3:16
Total length:				37:29

== Personnel ==
Credits are adapted from the album's liner notes.

Musicians

- Yves Tumor – vocals (all tracks), drums (track 1), bass (1, 3, 7, 8), guitars (2, 5), keyboards (2, 11), drum programming (2, 7, 11), FX (8)
- Ecco2k – additional vocals (1, 9)
- Thoom – additional vocals (1)
- Kidä – vocals (2)
- The Samples – choir vocals (4, 5, 6, 12)
- Fresh Jame – additional vocals (7)
- Mowalola – additional vocals (7)
- William Wadhams – additional vocals (7)
- Deto Black – additional vocals (7)
- Shannon Funchess – additional vocals (8)
- Sasha Desree – additional vocals (10)
- Tanner Orange – additional vocals (10)
- Rhys Hastings – drums (1, 3, 7, 12)
- Alexander Bazzi – bass (1)
- Jesse Schuster – bass (2)
- Chris Greatti – guitars (1, 3, 6–8, 12), additional vocals (10)
- Noah Goldstein – keyboards (1, 6, 9, 12), FX (6), drum programming (9, 11), guitars (9, 12), bass (11), brass (11)
- Jake Miller – keyboards (1, 9), bass (2, 3, 8), drum programming (7), guitars (10)
- Devon Taylor – brass (1, 3, 6)
- Jordan Katz – brass (1, 6)
- Daniel Aged – guitars (2), keyboards (2)
- Elliott Kozel – guitars (2, 3, 5–8, 11), keyboards (2, 3, 6, 7, 11), drum programming (2, 7–9), FX (6, 8), bass (9, 10)
- John Carroll Kirby – keyboards (2, 4, 5, 12)
- Psymun – drum programming (2, 8, 11), guitars (3, 7, 8, 10, 11), keyboards (3, 7, 9, 10, 11), FX (6, 8), bass (10)
- Lemar Carter – drums (3, 5, 6, 8–10)
- Kelly Moran – keyboards (3, 4)
- Dylan Wiggins – bass (5, 6, 12), keyboards (12)
- Joe Kennedy – guitars (6)
- Heavy Mellow – guitars (6)
- Yves Rothman – guitars (6)
- Yuli – strings (11)
- Brad Bowers – bass (11)

Technical

- Jake Miller – engineering (all tracks), mixing (2, 7, 10–12)
- Yves Rothman – engineering (1)
- Taylor Jackson – engineering (2, 3, 7–12)
- Nate Haessly – assistant engineer (1, 3, 7, 12)
- Jordan Cantor – assistant engineer (4–6, 8)
- Gabe Lowry – assistant engineer (4–6, 8)
- Alan Moulder – mixing (1, 3–6, 8, 9)
- Noah Goldstein – mixing (2, 7, 10–12)
- Tom Herbert – assistant mixing engineer (1, 3–6, 8, 9)
- Finn Howells – assistant mixing engineer (1, 3–6, 8, 9)
- Joe LaPorta – mastering (all tracks)

== Charts ==
Chart performance for Praise a Lord Who Chews...
Chart (2023)	Peak position
UK Album Downloads (Official Charts)	34
UK Independent Albums (Official Charts)	31
US Top Album Sales (Billboard)	81
