= Worster-Drought syndrome =

Medical condition

Worster-Drought syndrome is a form of congenital suprabulbar paresis that occurs in some children with cerebral palsy. It is caused by inadequate development of the corticobulbar tracts and causes problems with the mouth and tongue including impaired swallowing. A similar syndrome in adults is called anterior opercular syndrome.

A 1986 study of a family in which multiple members had Worster-Drought syndrome suggested it might be hereditary.

A 2000 review of cases classified Worster-Drought Syndrome as a form of cerebral palsy, caused by early damage to the brain, but identified no obvious causes during gestation or birth and found some families with a history of the condition. The syndrome was named after Cecil Charles Worster-Drought, the doctor who described it in 1956.

== Sources ==
- Worster-Drought C (August 1956). "Congenital suprabulbar paresis". The Journal of Laryngology and Otology. 70 (8): 453–63. doi:10.1017/S0022215156000115. PMID 13357872.
- Malcolm Ray McNeil, Clinical Management of Sensorimotor Speech Disorders, New York: Thieme, 1997, p. 407.
- Bianca Specht-Moser, "Die Behandlung des Kausystems in der Kinder- und Jugendneurorehabilitation - Elemente eines Rehabilitationspfades" MS Thesis, Danube University Krems, September 2004 (pdf, German)
