= Worst =

The Worst or Worst may refer to:

- John H. Worst (1850–1945), Lieutenant Governor of North Dakota
- Worst (manga), a 2002 Japanese delinquent manga series by Hiroshi Takahashi
- "The Worst" (The Amazing World of Gumball), a television episode
- "The Worst" (Onyx and Wu-Tang Clan song), 1998
- "The Worst" (Jhené Aiko song), 2014
- The Worst, a 1997 album by Sarcófago, or its title track
- The Worst, a 2000 album by Tech N9ne, or its title track
- The Worst, a 2004 EP by Lower Class Brats, or its title track
- "Worst (I Assume)", a song by JoJo from her 2021 album Trying Not to Think About It
- "The Worst", a song by the Rolling Stones from the album Voodoo Lounge, 1994

== See also ==
- Worster (surname)
- Worst-case scenario (disambiguation)
- Worse (disambiguation)
