= Worser Creek =

River in Palo Pinto County, Texas, United States

- Location within Texas

Location
- Country: United States
- State: Texas
- County: Palo Pinto County

Physical characteristics
- Mouth: Palo Pinto Creek
  - coordinates: 32°37′38″N 98°09′02″W
- Length: 7 miles (11 km)

Worser Creek is a stream in Palo Pinto County, Texas, in the United States. The creek flows seven miles (11 km) to its mouth at Palo Pinto Creek.

== See also ==
- List of rivers of Texas
