= Spell House =

Spell House may refer to:

- Spell House (Titusville, Florida), listed on the NRHP in Florida
- Spell House (Keachi, Louisiana), listed on the NRHP in Louisiana
