= Mono No Aware (album) =

Compilation album by various artists
- Released: 17 March 2017
- Genre: Ambient
- Length: 76:00
- Label: PAN
- Producers: Bill Kouligas; Rashad Becker
- Compiler: Bill Kouligas

Mono No Aware (stylized in all lowercase) is a various artists compilation album released by the Berlin-based record label PAN on 17 March 2017. Titled after the Japanese term of the same name, meaning "the pathos of things" or "an empathy towards things", Mono No Aware features a mix of released and previously unreleased tracks by artists under the PAN label, including Yves Tumor and Jeff Witscher.

== Release ==
Mono No Aware was first released on vinyl record as a "special art edition" at the Los Angeles Art Book Fair in February 2017, limited to 100 copies. The album later received a general release on physical and digital media on 17 March 2017.

== Reception ==
Professional ratings
Review scores
Source	Rating
Crack	8/10
Mixmag	9/10
Pitchfork	8.6/10
Tiny Mix Tapes	4/5 marks

Mark Richardson of Pitchfork gave the album a positive review, writing that "each piece of the 80-minute compilation has its own unique identity, yet together it feels like the work of one mind". Tom Watson of Crack Magazine wrote in his review of the album that "often, Mono No Aware achieves something transcendental with music that is hypnotic, diverse and tenebrous but clearly forged by the sensitive hands of humans"; Watson concludes by calling it "a Spirograph of uniquely experimental artists merging together to create something even more beguiling. A truly arresting listen". The album was listed as Mixmag's compilation of the month for May 2017, with reviewer Nina Posner describing it as "an incredibly strong ambient compilation".

Jake Witz of NPR praised Yves Tumor's track "Limerence", calling it "a heartbreaking look at how mono no aware transpires within the context of a romantic relationship". Witz commended the track's use of audio samples of romantic partners in a home video as "a haunting ceremony", and wrote that, "mono no aware is painful, but only if you see the past and present as disconnected worlds. By fusing decayed recordings with modern ambience, "Limerence" transforms death from a negative experience into a universal bond of empathy".

In 2025, Resident Advisor ranked it ninth in their list of "The Best Electronic Records 2000–25"; contributor Maya-Roisin Slater wrote: "A galvanising statement for the new generation who swept electronic music in the late '10s, Mono No Aware eerily predicted so many trends that grip our scene today. Take Malibu's baroque slowcore; Oli XL and Flora Yin-Wong's crackling sound design; james K's warped downtempo; or Yves Tumor's gentle arpeggios. The 2017 compilation, expertly curated by PAN boss Bill Kouligas, felt like a premonition for a future in which Reels and TikTok audio spill out from every passing phone, creating a wall of uneasy yet intriguing background noise".

== Track listing ==
No.	Title	Artist	Length
1.	"Fr3sh"	Kareem Lotfy	3:51
2.	"Held"	Malibu	6:21
3.	"Limerence"	Yves Tumor	5:29
4.	"Eliminator"	HELM	3:26
5.	"Open Invitation"	ADR	4:49
6.	"Second Mistake"	AYYA	7:15
7.	"Lugere"	Flora Yin-Wong	2:46
8.	"justforu"	Mya Gomez	5:30
9.	"VXOMEG"	Bill Kouligas	3:36
10.	"ok, American Medium"	Jeff Witscher	6:19
11.	"C6 81 56 28 09 34 31 D2 F9 9C D6 _BD 92 ED FC 6F 6C A9 D4 88 95 8C 53 B4 55 DF 38 _C4 AB E7 72 13"	TCF	3:42
12.	"Stretch Deep" (feat. Eve Essex)	james K	4:20
13.	"Huit"	Sky H1	3:50
14.	"Exasthrus (Pane)"	M.E.S.H.	3:43
15.	"Heretic"	Oli XL	4:17
16.	"Zhao Hua"	HVAD and Pan Daijing	6:46
Total length:			76:00

== Personnel ==
Production

- Rashad Becker – mastering
