= Spells (album) =

Studio album by the Comas
- Released: April 17, 2007
- Genre: Indie rock
- Length: 37:00
- Label: Vagrant

The Comas chronology
Conductor (2004)	Spells (2007)

Professional ratings
Aggregate scores
Source	Rating
Metacritic	72/100
Review scores
Source	Rating
AllMusic	3.5/5 stars
Pitchfork	7.4/10
PopMatters	7/10 stars

Spells is the fourth studio album by the indie rock band the Comas. It was released in 2007 on Vagrant Records.

== Track listing ==
All songs written by Andrew Herod.

1. "Red Microphones"
2. "Hannah T"
3. "Now I'm a Spider"
4. "Come My Sunshine"
5. "Stoneded"
6. "Light the Pad" (Herod, Adam Price)
7. "Sarah T"
8. "Thistledown"
9. "New Wolf"
10. "After the Afterglow"
