= Yves Tumor =

American musician & producer (born 1990)

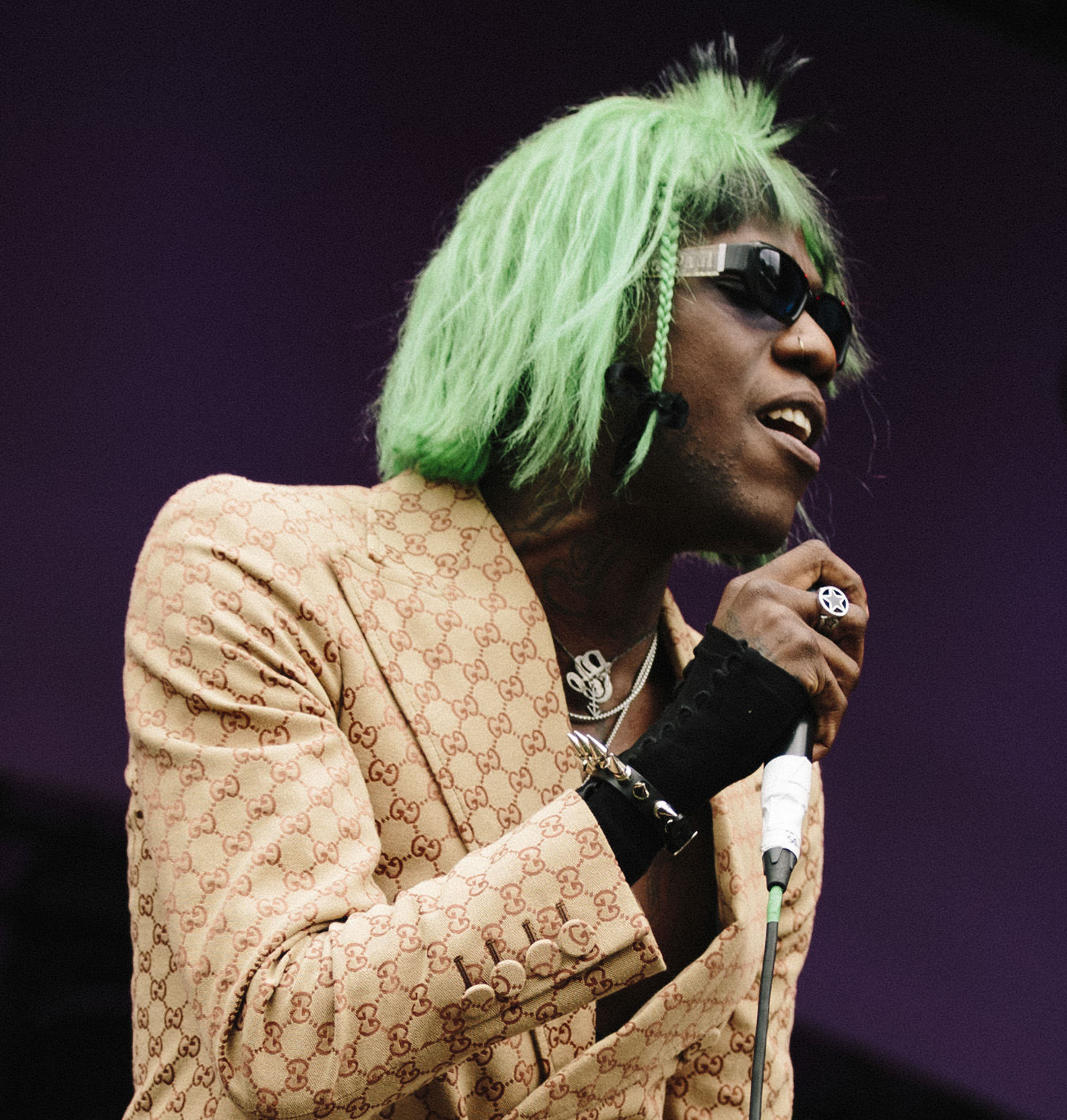
- Yves Tumor in 2019

Background information
- Also known as: Teams; Bekelé Berhanu; Rajel Ali; Shanti; Yvesie Ray Vaughan
- Born: Sean Lee Bowie; November 19, 1989 (age 37); Miami, Florida, U.S.
- Genres: Electronic; experimental; rock; neo-psychedelia
- Instruments: Vocals; synthesizer; keyboards; guitar; bass; drums
- Years active: 2010–present
- Labels: PAN; Warp
- Member of: Bodyguard; American Idol; Silkbless; Teamm Jordann; Trump$America
- Website: https://yvestumor.info

Sean Lee Bowie, best known by the recording alias Yves Tumor, is an American musician and producer of experimental music, born in Miami, Florida.

To date, they have released five studio albums: When Man Fails You (2015), Serpent Music (2016), Safe in the Hands of Love (2018), Heaven to a Tortured Mind (2020), and Praise a Lord Who Chews but Which Does Not Consume; (Or Simply, Hot Between Worlds) (2023).

== Life and career ==
Raised in Knoxville, Tennessee, Tumor started making music at age 16 as an outlet away from "dull, conservative surroundings". Tumor is self-taught, and plays drums, bass, guitar, and keyboards. Describing their experience growing up in Tennessee as unpleasant, Yves moved at age 20 to San Diego, and then after college, to Los Angeles. They met Mykki Blanco in 2012, later touring for two and a half years throughout Europe and Asia.

=== 2015–2017: Beginning of the Yves Tumor project ===
In the early 2010s, Tumor recorded as T.E.A.M.S., and made music which AllMusic described as "post-chillwave". After retiring the moniker in 2014, they debuted the Yves Tumor project in 2015. That same year, they released their first album, When Man Fails You (which would later be re-released by Apothecary Compositions on April 29, 2016).

In September 2016, Tumor signed with PAN Records and released their label debut, Serpent Music. Yves had worked on the album for three years after moving to Leipzig, Germany. The album was recorded between Miami, Leipzig, Los Angeles and Berlin. In Pitchfork's review of the album, critic Andy Beta compared Tumor's musical style to James Ferraro and Dean Blunt, and noted their use of "unsettling percussive loops and field recordings to create a mood as if lost in a strange urban landscape."

In September 2017, Tumor released a compilation album titled Experiencing the Deposit of Faith for free. Later that week, it was revealed through a tour announcement that Tumor had signed to Warp Records. Following the announcement, the artist embarked on a tour with a new audiovisual show.

=== 2018–2023: Safe in the Hands of Love, Heaven to a Tortured Mind and Praise a Lord... ===
In September 2018, Tumor released their Warp debut, Safe in the Hands of Love, with no prior announcement. It was preceded by the singles "Noid" on July 24, "Licking an Orchid" featuring James K on August 29, and "Lifetime" on September 3. The album received universal acclaim from music critics. Pitchfork's Jayson Greene stated in the review that the album "dwarfs everything the artist has released by several orders of magnitude. The leap is so audacious it's disorienting."

Tumor's fourth album, Heaven to a Tortured Mind, was released on April 3, 2020, preceded on March 3 by the single "Kerosene" featuring Diana Gordon. Alexis Petridis, reviewing the album for The Guardian, awarded it Album of the Week, describing it as "extraordinary: experimental, capable of any genre, with an internal logic powering its shifts in mood.[…] There's real skill involved in coming up with something that sounds coherent while shifting through so many styles."

In October 2020, Tumor said in an interview with Michèle Lamy " I have another EP and a whole album basically not finished, but ready to start finishing. I've been very busy during the quarantine." In December 2020, Tumor released the single "let all the poisons that lurk in the mud seep out" in collaboration with Kelsey Lu, featuring Kelly Moran and Moses Boyd. In July 2021, they released the EP The Asymptotical World, recorded in collaboration with their bandmates, Chris Greatti and Yves Rothman. Tumor went on an international tour throughout 2022, supported by October and the Eyes, Timkoh, and Doss.

In February 2023, Tumor was interviewed by Courtney Love for Interview, in which they briefly hinted at an upcoming album. Shortly after, in March 2023, Tumor released their fifth album, Praise a Lord Who Chews but Which Does Not Consume; (Or Simply, Hot Between Worlds), critically acclaimed as an ambitious, "ecstatic fusion of alt-rock and R&B", "spellbinding art rock", and a "Romantic, corporeal, gothy" offering that disrupts "hierarchies of gender, race, desire...and performance" via its "intense magnification and worship of life, death and spirituality." Tumor was part of the Coachella 2023 lineup.

=== 2024–present: American Idol project and collaborations ===
In 2024, Yves Tumor released a mixtape on their Soundcloud called American Idol – The Greatest Notes Chapter 1.

In 2025, Yves Tumor collaborated with Nina on the track "We Don't Count", with further collaborations teased. They also collaborated with Rosalía and Björk on the former's track "Berghain" for her album Lux.

In 2026, Yves Tumor was removed from their dates opening for Turnstile because of sexual assault allegations.

== Musical style ==
Tumor's earlier work was compared to that of Dean Blunt and James Ferraro, the latter of whom they have collaborated with; however, their more recent music, such as Heaven to a Tortured Mind, has been likened to Prince and David Bowie.

Tumor has cited Throbbing Gristle as an influence, saying: "Sonically, Throbbing Gristle (were very inspirational). There's something about their music, like the hypnotic trance vibes, that really influenced me. When I moved to Los Angeles after college, a good friend of mine would always play Chris & Cosey records when we were hanging out. I slowly became obsessed with them and started reading about Genesis P-Orridge and that whole movement."

== Personal life ==
In 2020, during the COVID-19 pandemic, Tumor designed furniture and furthered their interest in upholstery: "I just got really into my other hobbies, which include architecture and interior architecture, and urban architecture, but I'm not that good at math, so I wanted to scale everything down. I just decided to just start constructing chairs and couches and stools, but I think I'm going to begin welding as opposed to actual construction."

In August 2026, an Instagram story from an anonymous source was crossposted to Reddit, accusing Tumor of sexual assault, groping and biting, stating that the incident had been reported to police. Soon after, multiple other women posted their own accounts of harassment and assault on X, including musician Angel Money sharing a video of Tumor allegedly groping her, and former collaborator Kidä sharing her negative experiences as part of his touring band, describing it as "one of the most disrespectful professional experiences of [her] career." On 23 August 2026, Tumor responded in a deleted Instagram story, describing the allegations as "100% untrue and also completely heartbreaking", and stated they would take "extreme legal action".

== Backing band ==
In the studio and during live performances, Tumor is joined by:

- Yves Rothman – keyboards, synthesizers, rhythm guitar, sampler, electronics, backing vocals, musical director (2019–present)
- Rhys Hastings – drums (2019–present)
- Maro Chon – lead guitar (2024–present)

Former members of Tumor's ensemble are:

- Chris Greatti – lead guitar (2019–2024)
- Gina Ramirez – bass guitar (2019–2024)

== Discography ==
=== Studio albums ===
List of studio albums, with selected details and chart positions
Title	Details	Peak chart positions			
Title	Details	BEL (FL)	SCO	UK DL	UK Indie
When Man Fails You	Released: July 2, 2015; Label: Self-released (Note: Re-released by Apothecary Compositions on April 29, 2016, on cassette and digital download.); Format: Digital download, cassette	–	–	–	–
Serpent Music	Released: September 22, 2016; Label: PAN; Format: LP, digital download	–	–	–	–
Safe in the Hands of Love	Released: September 5, 2018; Label: Warp; Format: LP, CD, digital download	–	–	–	–
Heaven to a Tortured Mind	Released: April 3, 2020; Label: Warp; Format: LP, CD, digital download	170	38	29	8
Praise a Lord Who Chews but Which Does Not Consume; (Or Simply, Hot Between Worlds)	Released: March 17, 2023; Label: Warp; Format: LP, CD, digital download	–	–	34	–

=== Compilation albums ===
List of compilation albums, with selected details
Title	Details
Experiencing the Deposit of Faith	Released: September 13, 2017; Label: Self-released; Format: Digital download

=== Extended plays ===
List of extended plays, with selected details
Title	Details
The Asymptotical World	Released: July 15, 2021; Label: Warp; Format: LP, digital download

=== Singles ===
List of singles
Title	Year	Album
"Noid"	2018	Safe in the Hands of Love
"Licking an Orchid" (featuring James K)	2018	Safe in the Hands of Love
"Lifetime"	2018	Safe in the Hands of Love
"Applaud" (featuring Hirakish, Napolian, and Anthem)	2019	Non-album single
"Gospel for a New Century"	2020	Heaven to a Tortured Mind
"Kerosene!"	2020	Heaven to a Tortured Mind
"Romanticist" / "Dream Palette"	2020	Heaven to a Tortured Mind
"Jackie"	2021	The Asymptotical World
"God Is a Circle"	2022	Praise a Lord Who Chews but Which Does Not Consume; (Or Simply, Hot Between Worlds)
"Echolalia"	2023	Praise a Lord Who Chews but Which Does Not Consume; (Or Simply, Hot Between Worlds)
"Heaven Surrounds Us Like a Hood"	2023	Praise a Lord Who Chews but Which Does Not Consume; (Or Simply, Hot Between Worlds)
"Parody"	2023	Praise a Lord Who Chews but Which Does Not Consume; (Or Simply, Hot Between Worlds)
"We Don't Count" (featuring Nina)	2025	TBA

=== Guest appearances ===
List of guest appearances
Title	Year	Artist	Album
"Histrionic I"	2015	Mykki Blanco	Mykki Blanco Presents C-ORE
"Childish"	2015	Mykki Blanco	Mykki Blanco Presents C-ORE
"Histrionic II"	2015	Mykki Blanco	Mykki Blanco Presents C-ORE
"Histrionic III / Skunk of the Earth"	2015	Mykki Blanco	Mykki Blanco Presents C-ORE
"Limerence"	2017	None	Mono No Aware
"Reanimator"	2020	Joji	Nectar
"Let All the Poisons That Lurk in the Mud Seep Out"	2020	Kelsey Lu, Kelly Moran, Moses Boyd	Let All the Poisons That Lurk in the Mud Seep Out
"Perfectly Not Close to Me"	2022	Willow	Coping Mechanism
"Berghain"	2025	Rosalía, Björk	Lux

=== Remixes ===
List of remixes
Title	Year	Artist	Album
"Zure" (Yves Tumor Obsession Edit)	2017	Ryuichi Sakamoto	Async – Remodels
"The Altar" (Ruined By Yves Tumor)	2018	Alice Glass	Alice Glass (Remixes)
"Smoke" (Remix)	2018	Blood Orange, Yves Tumor, Ian Isiah	Smoke (Remix)

== Awards and nominations ==
Year	Association	Category	Nominated work	Result	Ref
2019	Libera Awards	Record of the Year	Safe in the Hands of Love	Nominated	
2019	Libera Awards	Best Dance/Electronic Record	Safe in the Hands of Love	Won	
2019	Libera Awards	Best Outlier Record	Safe in the Hands of Love	Nominated	
2020	AIM Independent Music Awards	Best Independent Track	"Gospel for a New Century"	Nominated	
2021	Libera Awards	Record of the Year	Heaven to a Tortured Mind	Nominated	
2021	Libera Awards	Best Outlier Record	Heaven to a Tortured Mind	Nominated	
2022	Libera Awards	Video of the Year	"Jackie"	Nominated	
2022	AIM Independent Music Awards	Best Independent Track	"Jackie"	Nominated	
2027	Grammy Awards	Record Of The Year	''Berghain'' (with Rosalía & Björk)	Pending	
