= Dry Spell =

A dry spell, also known as a drought, is a weather condition

Dry spell may also refer to:

== Books ==
- "Dry Spell", poem by Ellen Hopkins
- A Dry Spell, horror novel by Susie Moloney 1997
- A Dry Spell, romantic novel by Clare Chambers 2001

== Music ==
- "Dry Spell" (Burgess, James) by Johnny Hallyday from Rough Town (1994)
- "Dry Spell", song by Myka Relocate from Lies to Light the Way
- "Dry Spell", song by reggae band Pepper from Kona Town
- "Dry Spell", song by the funk group The Meters from Funky Miracle
- "Dry Spell", song by Casey Abrams, written Abrams, Friedman, Sheyne from Casey Abrams
- "Dry Spell" (song), by Kacey Musgraves from Middle of Nowhere (2026)

== Television ==
- "A Dry Spell", McLeod's Daughters season 2, episode 6 (2002)
- "A Dry Spell", Pocket Dragon Adventures episode 20a (1998)
- "Dry-Spell", Hullraisers episode 2 (2022)
- "Dry Spell", Care Bears (DIC series) episode 9a (1985)
- "Dry Spell", Extreme Ghostbusters episode 14 (1997)
- "Dry Spell", Inspector Gadget (1983) season 1, episode 52 (1983)
- "Dry Spell", Salvage 1 season 2, episode 5 (1979)
- "Dry Spell", Supa Strikas season 7, episode 7 (2020)
- "Dry Spell", The Deputy Dawg Show season 3, episode 2 (1963)
- "Dry Spell", The Good Doctor season 5, episode 12 (2022)
- "Dry Spells", Hollywood Darlings season 2, episode 7 (2018)
- "Dry Spells, Slang, Quitting", Girl Code season 4, episode 1 (2015)
- "The Dry Spell", Three Sisters (American) season 1, episode 4 (2001)
- "The Dry Spell", Turbo Fast season 3, episode 8 (2016)

== Other uses ==
- The Dry Spell, a 2023 Japanese film starring Toma Ikuta
