= Cecil Charles Worster-Drought =

English physician and neurologist

Cecil Charles Worster-Drought (2 August 1888–27 October 1971) was an English physician and neurologist. He discovered and named Worster-Drought syndrome. He was one of the founders of Moor House School, Oxted, Surrey, a school that specialises in speech and language disorders.
