= Hausu Mountain =

Record label

- Founded: 2012
- Founder: Doug Kaplan, Max Allison
- Genre: Indie rock, heavy metal, experimental rock, electronic
- Country of origin: United States
- Location: Chicago, Illinois
- Official website: www.hausumountain.com

Hausu Mountain is an American independent record label co-founded in 2012 by Doug Kaplan and Max Allison in Chicago, Illinois. The label specializes in releasing small editions by emerging artists on cassette tape, CD, and vinyl.

== History ==
Kaplan and Allison met at Northwestern University in 2008, where they co-hosted "Greatest Bits," a radio show focused on video game music. They decided to start their own label to release their own music as members of The Big Ship (Kaplan) and Good Willsmith (Kaplan & Allison). They drew inspiration from Ralph Records, the label run by The Residents. Kaplan worked with independent labels as the General Manager of WNUR and at the time he co-founded Hausu Mountain, Kaplan worked at Thrill Jockey and had completed an internship with The Numero Group. Kaplan and Allison rely on the relationships they build as friends, fans, and touring musicians to discover and sign music that is "boundary pushing, forward thinking, and unique within an artist's context or methods of creation, regardless of genre." Allison focuses on preproduction and design, often designing elaborate collages drawing on niche and popular culture for the label's releases, while Kaplan handles shipping, social media, and the logistics of releasing albums. Both share responsibility for curatorial decisions, press campaigns, and communicating with artists. Kaplan and Allison have both released solo projects on the label, along with their Good Willsmith bandmate Natalie Chami.

== See also ==
- List of record labels
