= PAN (record label) =

Experimental music record label (e. 2008)

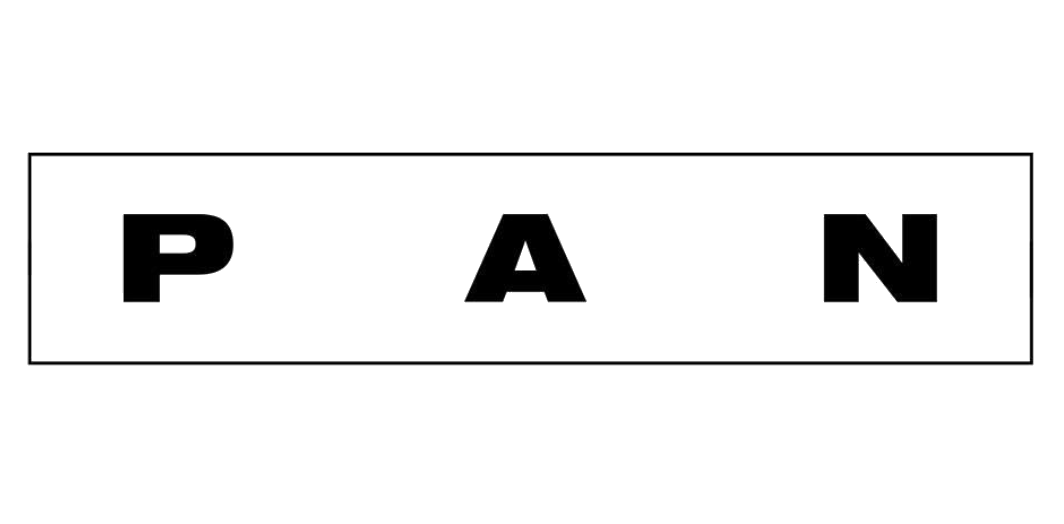
- Founder: Bill Kouligas
- Genre: Experimental
- Country of origin: Germany
- Location: Berlin
- Official website: https://p-a-n.org/

PAN is a Berlin-based record label founded in 2008 by Bill Kouligas. The label is known for its interdisciplinary approach to the fields of contemporary art and music, and has collaborated with institutions such as London's ICA. PAN has signed and distributed records by acts including Yves Tumor, Amnesia Scanner, Anne Imhof, Arca and Eartheater.

In 2017 PAN released its first compilation album, Mono No Aware, a collection of ambient songs by artists recording for the PAN label.
