= Mio Cristo Piange Diamanti =

Song by Rosalía

from the album Lux
- Language: Italian; English
- Released: 7 November 2025
- Recorded: 2023–2025
- Studio: Larrabee Studios (Los Angeles); Noah's Studio (Los Angeles); FB House (Miami); Air Studios (London); L'Auditori (Barcelona)
- Genre: Operatic pop; orchestral pop
- Length: 4:29
- Label: Columbia
- Composer: Rosalia Vila
- Lyricist: Rosalia Vila
- Producers: Rosalia; Noah Goldstein; Dylan Wiggins

"Mio Cristo Piange Diamanti" (Italian for “My Christ Cries Diamonds”; previously known as "Mio Cristo") is a song recorded by Spanish singer and songwriter Rosalía. It appears as the fifth song of her fourth studio album Lux, released on 7 November 2025 through Columbia Records. An operatic pop song, it was written solely by Rosalía and produced by herself alongside Noah Goldstein and Dylan Wiggins.

Built around orchestral and choral arrangements, the track features the London Symphony Orchestra —conducted by Daníel Bjarnason— and the Cor de Cambra del Palau de la Música Catalana, a musical institution deep-rooted in cultural catalanism. The composition adopts an aria-like structure, using Italian lyrics and religious imagery to explore themes of suffering, devotion, and transformation. The song is performed entirely in Italian except for the last line.

== Background ==
Rosalía has always had great interest in classical music, participating in multiple programs to make it more accessible to a wider and more juvenile audience. In 2013 she sang as a soloist for the closure of the Any Espriu and, in 2015 and 2016 —after graduating from flamenco studies in the Catalonia College of Music— she worked as a cantaora in the Flamencat program of the Palau de la Música Catalana. After the release of El Mal Querer (2018), she sang alongside the Orfeó Català at the 33rd Goya Awards.

In 2023, Following the experimental and genre-blending approach on Motomami (2022), Rosalía started recording her next album. She conceived Lux as a deeply spiritual and conceptual album, exploring themes of divinity, mysticism, and the human connection with God. The project marked a shift away from the more urban sound of her previous era, incorporating classical instrumentation, choral arrangements, and multilingual influences. Lux was officially announced on 20 October 2025.

On 30 October 2025, a week prior to its official release, "Mio Cristo Piange Diamanti" was previewed during an appearance by Rosalía on Popcast, a podcast by The New York Times. "Mio Cristo Piange Diamanti" was developed as part of this approach and was originally titled “Mio Cristo” during its early stages, and appears as such on the CD and LP versions of the album.

== Composition and lyrics ==
"Mio Cristo Piange Diamanti" is an orchestral and vocal composition situated within art pop and operatic pop, with clear influence from sacred and classical music traditions. The arrangement is centered on violin strings by Natalie Klouda and Magdalena Filipczak, cello strings by Ashok Klouda, and solo vocal performance by Rosalía, with background vocals by the Cor de Cambra del Palau de la Música Catalana at the end. The song has no prominent use of contemporary rhythm-based instrumentation. The recording also features a fully scored orchestral performance by a Daníel Bjarnason-conducted London Symphony Orchestra, with individual instrumental contributions including violin and cello, reinforcing its grounding in classical ensemble writing.

Structurally, the song unfolds in a manner comparable to an aria, emphasizing vocal phrasing, dynamic contrast, and sustained melodic lines over conventional verse–chorus repetition. Rosalía’s vocal performance occupies the central role, supported by choral harmonies. Lyrically, the song is inspired by Clare of Assisi, a follower of Francis of Assisi and founder of the Order of Poor Ladies. Rosalía wrote the song "for over a year", first in Spanish and then in Italian, for which she used Google Translate before sending it to a professional translator. The use of Italian in "Mio Cristo Piange Diamanti" contributes to a liturgical tone, distancing the narrative from everyday language and reinforcing its ceremonial character. The song ends with a spoken phrase in English that drives to a second climax and transitions to the following song, "Berghain".

== Live performances ==
"Mio Cristo Piange Diamanti" was included in the setlist of the Lux Tour, which ran from March to September 2026 in the continents of Europe, North America and South America. It was performed at the end of Act I, between "Divinize" and "Berghain". In live settings, the song is presented with emphasis on vocal performance and orchestral accompaniment.

== Credits and personnel ==
Credits adapted from the liner notes of Lux.

Publishing

- Songs of Universal, Inc. (BMI), o/b/o Itself and La Guantera Publishing
- Concord Copyrights, o/b/o Nono Good, c/o Concord Music Publishing (BMI)
- Sony/ATV (BMI)

Production personnel

- Rosalía Vila – production, lyrics, composition, vocal production; vocals
- Noah Goldstein – production
- Dylan Wiggins – production
- David Rodríguez – vocal production
- London Symphony Orchestra – orchestra
- Daníel Bjarnason – orchestra conduction
- Ashok Klouda – cello
- Natalie Klouda – violin
- Magdalena Filipczak – violin
- Cor de Cambra del Palau de la Música Catalana – choir

Technical personnel

- David Rodríguez – recording engineer
- Isaac Diskin – recording engineer
- Harry Wilson – recording engineer
- Tristan Hoogland – recording engineer
- Manny Marroquin – mixing engineer
- Ramiro Fernández-Seoane – assistant mixing engineer
- Francesco Di Giovanni – assistant mixing engineer
- Brian Lee – mastering engineer
- Bob Jackson – mastering engineer

Additional credits

- Kyle Gordon – score transcription

== Charts ==
Chart (2025)	Peak position
Global 200 (Billboard)	109
Italy (FIMI)	54
France (SNEP)	142
Spain (PROMUSICAE)	11
Portugal (AFP)	14
