= Lux Tour =

2026 concert tour by Rosalía

- Transcontinental tour by Rosalía
- Promotional poster for the tour
- Location: Europe; North America; South America
- Associated album: Lux
- Start date: 16 March 2026
- End date: 16 September 2026
- Legs: 3
- No. of shows: 57

Rosalía concert chronology
- Motomami World Tour (2022); Lux Tour (2026)

The Lux Tour was the fourth concert tour by Spanish singer Rosalía, in support of her fourth studio album, Lux (2025). The tour began on 16 March 2026 in Lyon, France and concluded on 16 September 2026 in Miami, United States.

== Background ==
In June 2025, Hits revealed that Rosalía would embark on an arena tour in 2026. It also confirmed that she had signed with September Management and that her new album was expected to be released before the end of the year. On 7 November 2025, Rosalía released her fourth studio album, Lux, marking her first major release since Motomami (2022). The album became a critical and commercial success, peaking at four on the UK Albums Chart and the Billboard 200. She would later reveal that she had three notebooks with sketches and ideas for the tour, intending for it to represent the "maximalist" and "brutalist" music.

Rosalía announced the tour on 4 December, scheduling forty-two shows across seventeen countries in Europe, North America, and South America from March to September 2026. General sale tickets went on sale on 11 December 2025, with pre-sales available through Live Nation two days earlier. Pre-access to tickets was also given to special cardholders, including Banco Santander, American Express, and Banamex. The tour marks her first ever all-arena tour, making it Rosalía's biggest headlining tour to date.

== Stage design ==
The stage design of the Lux Tour reflects its maximalist and theatrical concept, in contrast to the minimal staging of her previous tour. The production features two connected performance areas: a main stage and a secondary B-stage. The main stage is semi-circular in shape and dominated by a large white canvas curtain positioned at its center, which opens and closes throughout the show to introduce different acts. This element functions both as a visual centerpiece and as a narrative device.

== Concert synopsis ==
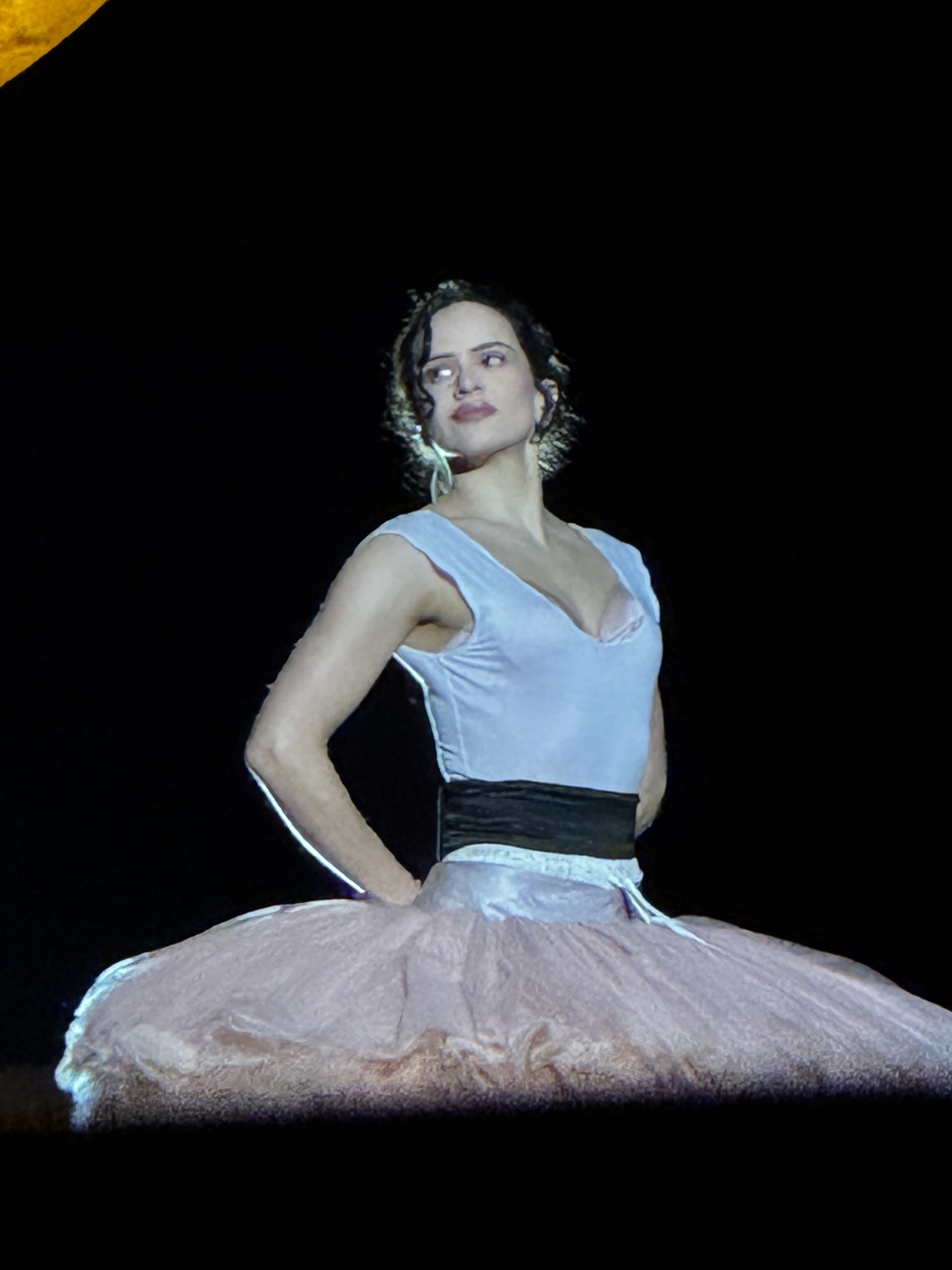
Rosalía opening the show with "Sexo, Violencia y Llantas"

The Lux Tour is presented as a multi-act, theatrical performance in which the setlist unfolds through a series of visual and stylistic transformations. Its presented as a maximalist show, in contrast with the minimalism of the Motomami World Tour. It is a show "build for arenas". The show opens with an orchestral overture played by The Heritage Orchestra, which —whilst conducted by Yudania Gómez Heredia— accompanies the singer during the show, playing from Stage B, which is arranged in the shape of a Latin cross. The Lux Tour is structured in four acts plus an intermezzo, each with distinct staging, costumes, and choreography by celebrated French dance collective (La) Horde, who brought ten dancers to accompany Rosalía throughout the show. It is the first show of Rosalía to have more than one stage and to include costume changes.

"Angel" by Jimi Hendrix backs the entrance of the orchestra. A white canvas opens to Rosalía emerging from a large box, dressed as a ballet dancer. Act I starts with "Sexo, Violencia y Llantas" —the opening track on Lux— followed by "Reliquia" and "Porcelana". During the set, she maintains this ballet-inspired image, performing controlled, minimal choreography under soft lighting that evokes religious iconography. This tone becomes more overtly devotional in "Divinize", in which the dancers adapt a 1941 performance by Ruth St. Denis. For "Mio Cristo Piange Diamanti", Rosalía covers her body with a white layer.

The atmosphere shifts abruptly at the beginning of Act II. Starting with "Berghain," Rosalía adopts a darker persona, accompanied by harsher lighting, electronic arrangements, and horned costume that resembles El Aquelarre, the 1798 painting by Francisco de Goya. Her dancers wear a ruff around their neck, historically associated with Renaissance and Elizabethan fashion. A part of the Conrad Taylor remix of "Berghain" plays at the end, similar to the Brit Awards performance. Rosalía wear a Marie Antoniette-like wig during "Saoko", which is followed by two other Motomami songs: "La Fama" and "La Combi Versace". She later performs an extended version of "De Madrugá", slightly revamping the choreography used during El Mal Querer Tour. The canvas closes again and premieres the following act.

Act III starts with an orchestral version of "El Redentor", the only song to be performed off her debut record Los Ángeles (2017). The show continues with a cover of Frankie Valli's "Can't Take My Eyes Off You", during which she invites a dozen previously-selected fans to join her onstage to admire her performance as she sings behind a painting frame. The cameras then follow the singer to a confessional in which a fan or celebrity tells her a story about an ex-partner. Rosalía returns onstage and dedicates "La Perla" to the person's ex-partner. During the performance, Rosalía dresses in white clothing and black evening gloves that contrast with the dancers'. Journalists saw resemblances in Eva Green's performances in Bernardo Bertolucci's The Dreamers (2003). The performance is choreographed by Dimitris Papaioannou, the artistic director of the opening and closing Ceremonies of the 2004 Summer Olympics. Rosalía interacts with the audience and drinks a glass of wine to perform "Sauvignon Blanc", performed at the piano with Llorenç Barceló. She then performs "La Yugular" to a floor camera that sees her through a glass.

An intermezzo is performed alongside the orchestra at the show's B-Stage. It begins with "Dios Es un Stalker", which is sung alongside the audience as Rosalía walks toward the B-Stage. This is followed by "La Rumba del Perdón" and "Cuuuuuuuuuute". During the performance of the latter one, a botafumeiro —a giant thurible in the Santiago de Compostela Cathedral, deeply ingrained in Galician culture— swings above the stage.

Rosalía wears angel wings during Act IV, which starts with the dancy tracks "Bizcochito" and "Despechá". She goes on to perform "Focu 'Ranni", running around the stage. During the end of "Focu 'Ranni", the singer climbs a stair, extends her arms and then falls backwards off the top of the structure. The canvas closes again to later reveal the encore, in which Rosalía sings "Magnolias" in a more stripped-back and reflective manner. She disappears into the dust and heaven lights and leaves the stage.

== Critical reception ==
=== Europe ===
The European leg of the tour received positive reviews from critics. Attending the March 18 show at the Accor Arena, Violaine Schütz of Numéro magazine wrote that "Once again Rosalía succeeded in reinventing the pop concert, breaking new ground with a hybrid show blending theatre, opera, performance, mass, installation and contemporary dance. Using raw materials like white sheets, wood, cardboard, she managed to infuse poetry, humanity and craftsmanship into a large-scale performance. The orchestra, placed in the middle of the pit, added a lyrical dimension to the whole production". Reviewing the Spanish run in Madrid and Barcelona, Sebas Alonso of Jenesaispop gave the show a 9/10, citing the artist's constant reinvention. Other publications such as El País and El Periodico also praised the show's confection and gear, conceiving it as an ancient piece of art. About the shows at the Ziggo Dome, Amsterdam-based newspaper Het Parool gave the show a positive review, distinguishing that "between digital music and classical strings, the singer effortlessly held her own vocally."

The two concerts at London's O2 Arena in May were highly acclaimed, with numerous publications awarding 5/5-star reviews. NME described the May 5 show as a "breathtakingly brilliant work of art", while Alexis Petridis of The Guardian proclaimed the tour as "one of the boldest, most highbrow arena shows in pop history" and wrote that "It's a remarkably visceral experience, partly down to the fact that the disruptive electronic elements of the songs’ arrangements bombard the audience at astonishing volume – you can literally feel them in your ribcage – but mostly down to Rosalía's voice. It's not so much her way with an operatic flourish or ability to hit a high B flat, impressive though that is, but how emotionally powerful her vocals are: all the virtuosity in the world can't account for her ability to break your heart with the fragility of "Divinize" or to send it soaring with the climax of 'Mio Cristo Piange Diamanti'". In another 5-star review, Rolling Stone UK's Will Richards found the show "pretty weighty stuff, high on drama and concept. What makes the show remarkable, though, is how inclusive she makes it". Other publications coincided, summarizing the show as "symbolic yet never pretentious", "astonishing" and "something that AI will never be able to replicate".

=== North America ===
The North American leg of the tour received positive reviews from critics. Reviewing the first of Rosalía's two nights in Madison Square Garden, Julyssa Lopez of Rolling Stone described the tour as "A spectacle only she could pull off" and one that was "part opera, part ballet, part pop extravaganza — and entirely her own" while Selena Fragassi of the Chicago Sun-Times wrote when reviewing the date on June 20 that "Everything about Saturday night was a masterpiece with devoted attention to detail and staging. Dancers wore black-out garb that provided optical illusions as they moved around the singer. The orchestra seating arrangement was set up like a cross for added effect. At one point, in a cover of Frankie Valli's 'Can't Take My Eyes Off You', Rosalía even became the art, standing inside a gold frame as a line of fans pulled from the crowd stood behind gallery ropes to gawk at her".

== Commercial performance ==
Pre-sales for the North American leg began on 9 December 2025. That same day, an additional date was added in Inglewood, Miami, and New York City. One day later, new dates were announced in Amsterdam, Mexico City, Guadalajara, London, Rio de Janeiro, and Santiago. On December 10, two additional dates in Buenos Aires and one date each in Bogotá and Mexico City were added due to high demand. The tour was Rosalía's first to visit all arenas and maintained a 100% attendance rate, grossing a reported 42.88 million from only 27 of its 57 total dates.

== Set list ==
This set list is from the 15 April 2026, concert in Barcelona, Spain. It is not intended to represent all concerts for the tour.

Act I

1. "Sexo, Violencia y Llantas"
2. "Reliquia"
3. "Porcelana"
4. "Divinize"
5. "Mio Cristo Piange Diamanti"

Act II

6. "Berghain"
7. "Saoko"
8. "La Fama"
9. "La Combi Versace"
10. "De Madrugá"

Act III

11. "El Redentor"
12. "Can't Take My Eyes Off You"
13. "La Perla"
14. "Sauvignon Blanc"
15. "La Yugular"

Intermezzo

16. "Dios Es un Stalker"
17. "La Rumba del Perdón"
18. "CUUUUuuuuuute"

Act IV

19. "Bizcochito"
20. "Despechá"
21. "Focu 'Ranni"

Encore

22. "Magnolias"

=== Notes ===
- During the concert in Lyon, Rosalía performed "La Noche de Anoche" between "CUUUUuuuuuute" and "Bizcochito".
- Rosalía ended the concert in Milan after "De Madrugá" due to food poisoning.
- During the shows in Lisbon, Rosalía performed "Memória" alongside Carminho between "La Rumba del Perdón" and "CUUUUuuuuuute".
- Until the second concert in Barcelona, "Novia Robot" was performed between "Despechá" and "Focu 'Ranni".
- During the second concert in Rio de Janeiro, Rosalía performed a tribute to Caetano Veloso, singing an a cappella medley of "Sozinho", "Un Vestido y un Amor" and "Águas de março".
- Rosalía ended the second concert in Guadalajara after "Bizcochito" due to adverse weather conditions.

=== Confessional segment ===
During Act III, Rosalía incorporates a recurring confessional segment before "La Perla". In the segment, the singer enters a confessional booth and speaks with a selected guest, who takes the role of a penitent and recounts a humorous or chaotic story about love, dating, or an ex-partner. The exchange leads into the performance of "La Perla", which Rosalía dedicates to the person described in the confession. The segment extends the tour's religious and theatrical imagery while adding an improvised, city-specific element to each show. As of August 2026, the following guests had appeared during the confessional segment. Guests for future shows have not been announced.

Date	City	Guest
16 March 2026	Décines-Charpieu	Unidentified fan
18 March 2026	Paris	LYAS (Note: Identified by LOS40 as Elias Medini.)
20 March 2026	Paris	Salome Topuria
30 March 2026	Madrid	Esty Quesada
1 April 2026	Madrid	Métrika
3 April 2026	Madrid	Aitana
4 April 2026	Madrid	Shannis
8 April 2026	Lisbon	Marcelo Wang
9 April 2026	Lisbon	Kika Nazareth
13 April 2026	Barcelona	Yolanda Ramos
15 April 2026	Barcelona	Guitarricadelafuente
17 April 2026	Barcelona	Bad Gyal
18 April 2026	Barcelona	Rojuu
22 April 2026	Amsterdam	Giulia Stabile
27 April 2026	Antwerp	Jennifer Heylen
29 April 2026	Cologne	Rachel Marx
1 May 2026	Berlin	Najwa Nimri
5 May 2026	London	Lola Young
6 May 2026	London	Cara Delevingne
13 June 2026	Toronto	Benito Skinner
16 June 2026	New York City	Maggie Rogers
17 June 2026	New York City	Marcello Hernández
20 June 2026	Chicago	Jocelyn Zamudio
23 June 2026	Houston	Harper Watters
27 June 2026	Paradise	Jewels Sparkles
29 June 2026	Inglewood	Karol G
1 July 2026	Inglewood	Odessa A'zion
3 July 2026	San Diego	Brittany Broski
6 July 2026	Oakland	Chappell Roan
16 July 2026	Bogotá	Juliana Velásquez
18 July 2026	Bogotá	Tokischa
24 July 2026	Santiago	Francisca Valenzuela
25 July 2026	Santiago	Romina Pistolas
27 July 2026	Santiago	Katteyes
29 July 2026	Santiago	Princesa Alba
1 August 2026	Buenos Aires	Ángela Torres
2 August 2026	Buenos Aires	Lali
4 August 2026	Buenos Aires	La Joaqui
6 August 2026	Buenos Aires	Taichu
10 August 2026	Rio de Janeiro	Marina Sena
11 August 2026	Rio de Janeiro	Pabllo Vittar
15 August 2026	Tlajomulco de Zúñiga	Yeri Mua
16 August 2026	Tlajomulco de Zúñiga	Michel Chavez
19 August 2026	Monterrey	Samy Rivers
22 August 2026	Mexico City	Kenia Os
24 August 2026	Mexico City	Mon Laferte
26 August 2026	Mexico City	Maria Bottle
28 August 2026	Mexico City	Renata Cerda y Soleón
29 August 2026	Mexico City	Wendy Guevara
3 September 2026	San Juan	Young Miko
9 September 2026	Orlando	Arcángel
14 September 2026	Miami	Greeicy
16 September 2026	Miami	Ayo Edebiri

== Tour dates ==
List of 2026 concerts
Date (2026)	City	Country	Venue	Attendance	Revenue
16 March	Décines-Charpieu (Note: Labelled as Lyon in promotion material.)	France	LDLC Arena	13,831 / 13,831	$1,329,053
18 March	Paris	France	Accor Arena	31,006 / 31,006	$3,297,234
20 March	Paris	France	Accor Arena	31,006 / 31,006	$3,297,234
22 March	Zurich	Switzerland	Hallenstadion	13,862 / 13,862	$1,854,655
25 March	Assago (Note: Labelled as Milan in promotion material.) (Note: Rosalía ended the show mid-setlist due to food poisoning.)	Italy	Unipol Forum	9,865 / 9,865	$1,037,572
30 March	Madrid	Spain	Movistar Arena	66,672 / 66,672	$6,981,290
1 April	Madrid	Spain	Movistar Arena	66,672 / 66,672	$6,981,290
3 April	Madrid	Spain	Movistar Arena	66,672 / 66,672	$6,981,290
4 April	Madrid	Spain	Movistar Arena	66,672 / 66,672	$6,981,290
8 April	Lisbon	Portugal	MEO Arena	31,462 / 31,462	$2,741,836
9 April	Lisbon	Portugal	MEO Arena	31,462 / 31,462	$2,741,836
13 April	Barcelona	Spain	Palau Sant Jordi	65,885 / 65,885	$6,478,114
15 April	Barcelona	Spain	Palau Sant Jordi	65,885 / 65,885	$6,478,114
17 April	Barcelona	Spain	Palau Sant Jordi	65,885 / 65,885	$6,478,114
18 April	Barcelona	Spain	Palau Sant Jordi	65,885 / 65,885	$6,478,114
22 April	Amsterdam	Netherlands	Ziggo Dome	29,873 / 29,873	$3,087,632
23 April	Amsterdam	Netherlands	Ziggo Dome	29,873 / 29,873	$3,087,632
27 April	Antwerp	Belgium	AFAS Dome	18,856 / 18,856	$1,779,959
29 April	Cologne	Germany	Lanxess Arena	15,379 / 15,379	$1,327,572
1 May	Berlin	Germany	Uber Arena	12,278 / 12,278	$1,257,534
5 May	London	England	The O_{2} Arena	30,491 / 30,491	$3,456,344
6 May	London	England	The O_{2} Arena	30,491 / 30,491	$3,456,344
11 June	Boston	United States	TD Garden	11,599 / 11,599	$1,632,379
13 June	Toronto	Canada	Scotiabank Arena	—	—
16 June (Note: The 16 June 2026 concert in New York City was originally rescheduled for 18 June 2026 due to New York Knicks possibly contesting the 2026 NBA Finals Game 6. It was later rescheduled again, back to its original date.)	New York City	United States	Madison Square Garden	24,496 / 24,496	$3,809,783
17 June	New York City	United States	Madison Square Garden	24,496 / 24,496	$3,809,783
20 June	Chicago	United States	United Center	—	—
23 June	Houston	United States	Toyota Center	—	—
27 June	Paradise (Note: Labelled as Las Vegas in promotion material.)	United States	T-Mobile Arena	13,795 / 13,795	$1,221,853
29 June	Inglewood (Note: Labelled as Los Angeles in promotion material.)	United States	Kia Forum	—	—
1 July	Inglewood	United States	Kia Forum	—	—
3 July	San Diego	United States	Pechanga Arena	—	—
6 July	Oakland	United States	Oakland Arena	12,895 / 12,895	$1,596,427
16 July	Bogotá	Colombia	Movistar Arena	—	—
18 July	Bogotá	Colombia	Movistar Arena	—	—
24 July	Santiago	Chile	Movistar Arena	—	—
25 July	Santiago	Chile	Movistar Arena	—	—
27 July	Santiago	Chile	Movistar Arena	—	—
29 July	Santiago	Chile	Movistar Arena	—	—
1 August	Buenos Aires	Argentina	Movistar Arena	—	—
2 August	Buenos Aires	Argentina	Movistar Arena	—	—
4 August	Buenos Aires	Argentina	Movistar Arena	—	—
6 August	Buenos Aires	Argentina	Movistar Arena	—	—
10 August	Rio de Janeiro	Brazil	Farmasi Arena	—	—
11 August	Rio de Janeiro	Brazil	Farmasi Arena	—	—
15 August	Tlajomulco de Zúñiga (Note: Labelled as Guadalajara in promotion material.)	Mexico	Arena VFG	—	—
16 August	Tlajomulco de Zúñiga	Mexico	Arena VFG	—	—
19 August	Monterrey	Mexico	Arena Monterrey	—	—
22 August	Mexico City	Mexico	Palacio de los Deportes	—	—
24 August	Mexico City	Mexico	Palacio de los Deportes	—	—
26 August	Mexico City	Mexico	Palacio de los Deportes	—	—
28 August	Mexico City	Mexico	Palacio de los Deportes	—	—
29 August	Mexico City	Mexico	Palacio de los Deportes	—	—
3 September	San Juan	Puerto Rico	José Miguel Agrelot Coliseum	—	—
9 September (Note: The 9 September 2026 concert in Orlando was originally scheduled for 8 June 2026, but was rescheduled due to due a family emergency.)	Orlando	United States	Kia Center	—	—
14 September (Note: The 14 and 16 September 2026 concerts in Miami were originally scheduled for 4 and 6 June 2026, but were rescheduled due to due a family emergency.)	Miami	United States	Kaseya Center	—	—
16 September	Miami	United States	Kaseya Center	—	—
TOTAL				402,335 / 402,335 (100%)	$42,889,237

== Personnel ==
Credits adapted from the tour book.

Show
- Rosalia Vila – lead vocals
- Claudia Lachispa – backup vocals
- Aroa Fernández – backup vocals
- The Heritage Orchestra – orchestra
- Yudania Gómez – orchestra conductor
- Llorenç Barceló – piano
- Paula Tato – dancer
- Antonie Van der Linen – dancer
- Ibai Jiménez – dancer
- Jal Joshua – dancer
- Donnie Duncan – dancer
- Luca-Andrea Lino – dancer
- Toon Lobach – dancer
- Giulia Stabile – dancer
- Fatoubah – dancer
- Juan Vicente – dancer
- Joaquín Ruiz – dancer

Didde-mie Lykke – dancer

- Celeste Cancel – dancer

Crew

- Rosalia Vila – creative direction
- Pilar Vila – creative direction, tour management
- (La)Horde – choreography direction
- Charm La'Donna – choreography direction
- Dimitris Papaioannou – choreography on "La Perla"
- Vito Giotta – choreography assistant
- Samuel Vázquez – choreohraphy assistant
- José Maya – flamenco consultant
- Pilar Tobella – tour management
- Diana Lizalde – tour management
- Nuria Tobella – tour management
- Terrivle Studio – stage direction
- Studios Dennis Vanderbroeck – stage design consultant
- Ann Demeulemeester – clothing
- Antonio Velasco – clothing
- Maison Vivascarrion – clothing
- Les Fleurs Studio – clothing
