= Dios Es un Stalker =

Song by Rosalía

from the album Lux
- Language: Spanish
- Released: 7 November 2025
- Recorded: 2023–2025
- Studio: Larrabee Studios (Los Angeles); Noah's Studio (Los Angeles); FB House (Miami); Air Studios (London); L'Auditori (Barcelona)
- Genre: Pop
- Length: 2:10 (digital); 2:57 (physical edition)
- Label: Columbia
- Composers: Rosalia Vila; Noah Goldstein; David Rodríguez; Dylan Wiggins
- Lyricist: Rosalia Vila
- Producers: Rosalía; Goldstein; Wiggins

"Dios Es un Stalker" (transl. "God is a Stalker") is a song recorded by Spanish singer and songwriter Rosalía. It is the tenth track on her fourth studio album, Lux, released on 7 November 2025 through Columbia Records. The song was written by Rosalía alongside Noah Goldstein, Dylan Wiggins, and David Rodríguez, with production handled primarily by Rosalía and her collaborators. A fan favorite, "Dios Es un Stalker" is a minimalist, atmospheric pop track that blends orchestral elements by the London Symphony Orchestra with subtle electronic production, reflecting the spiritual and conceptual direction of the album.

Written from the perspective of a divine entity observing a human, the lyrics use religious imagery to explore themes of omnipresence, devotion, and surveillance, framing love and attention as simultaneously intimate and intrusive. Critics have interpreted the track as both satirical and unsettling, reflecting on emotional fixation, humanized divinity, and the pressures of fame, while fitting within Lux's broader spiritual and symbolic framework.

== Background ==
Following the experimental and genre-blending approach of her earlier work, Rosalía conceived Lux as a deeply spiritual and conceptual album, exploring themes of divinity, mysticism, and the human connection with God. The project marked a shift away from the more urban sound of her previous era, incorporating classical instrumentation, choral arrangements, and multilingual influences.

On 30 October 2025, a week prior to its official release, "Dios Es un Stalker" was previewed during an appearance by Rosalía on Popcast, a podcast by The New York Times.

== Composition and lyrics ==
"Dios Es un Stalker" is an experimental pop song by Rosalía that combines minimalist and orchestral elements, featuring elements of champer pop and salsa in its LP and CD edition. Lyrically, the song is written from the perspective of a divine entity observing a human subject, reframing the traditional concept of an omnipresent God through contemporary language associated with surveillance and obsession. Rosalía has described the premise as intentionally ironic and “absurd,” using religious imagery to explore themes of omnipresence, devotion, and scrutiny. The lyrics portray a constant, invisible presence, blending spirituality with modern emotional attachment and fixation.

== Release and versions ==
"Dios Es un Stalker" was released in multiple formats as part of the album, with notable differences between its physical (vinyl and CD) and digital download and streaming editions. The digital version runs for two minutes and ten seconds, while the physical version runs for two minutes and fifty five second, reflecting the final sequencing of the album.

The LP and CD versions feature an alternate or extended version of the track, finalized earlier in the production process before later revisions were made to the digital master. As a result, the physical version differs in arrangement, length, and mix. It includes additional lyrical content, a longer structure, and a slightly different tonal quality, often described as brighter and more expansive. A digital reissue, titled Lux (Complete Works), was released on 17 April 2026, featuring the extensive version of the song included in the physical edition, which was dubbed as "Francotiradora version".

== Live performances ==
"Dios Es un Stalker" was first performed live by Rosalía as part of the Lux Tour, which began in March 2026 in Lyon, France. The performance appears in a theatrical, multi-act show combining elements of opera, ballet, and contemporary staging.

Within the concert, the song is performed as Rosalía walks to a more intimate segment on a secondary stage (B-stage), surrounded by The Heritage Orchestra. The staging emphasizes closeness with the audience, often encouraging participation and sing-along moments.

== Credits and personnel ==
Credits adapted from the liner notes of Lux.

Publishing

- Songs of Universal, Inc. (BMI), o/b/o Itself and La Guantería Publishing
- Concord Copyrights, o/b/o Nono Good, c/o Concord Music Publishing (BMI)
- Sony/ATV (BMI)

Production personnel

- Rosalía Vila – production, lyrics, composition, vocal production; vocals
- Noah Goldstein – production, composition
- Dylan Wiggins – production, composition
- David Rodríguez – composition, vocal production
- Jake Miller – additional production
- London Symphony Orchestra – orchestra
- Daníel Bjarnason – orchestra conduction
- Cor de Cambra del Palau de la Música Catalana – choir
- Daniel Aged – bass

Technical personnel

- Angelica Negrón – arranger
- David Rodríguez – recording engineer
- Jake Miller – recording engineer
- Isaac Diskin – recording engineer
- Harry Wilson – recording engineer
- Tristan Hoogland – recording engineer
- Manny Marroquin – mixing engineer
- Ramiro Fernández-Seoane – assistant mixing engineer
- Francesco Di Giovanni – assistant mixing engineer
- Brian Lee – mastering engineer
- Bob Jackson – mastering engineer

Additional credits

- Kyle Gordon – score transcription

== Charts ==
Chart (2025)	Peak position
Argentina (Argentina Hot 100)	73
Global 200 (Billboard)	90
France (SNEP)	164
Spain (PROMUSICAE)	7
Portugal (AFP)	15
United States (Billboard Hot Latin Songs)	17

== Certifications ==
Certifications
Region	Certification	Certified units/sales
Spain (Promusicae)	Platinum	100,000^{‡}
^{‡} Sales+streaming figures based on certification alone.
