= Los 40 Music Awards 2026 =

Spanish music awards ceremony

LOS40 Music Awards Santander 2026
- Date: 20 November 2026
- Location: Palau Sant Jordi, Barcelona
- Presented by: Los 40
- Hosted by: Cristina Boscá; Dani Moreno "El Gallo"; Tony Aguilar

Highlights
- Most wins: Rosalía (4)
- Most nominations: Rosalía (7)
- Website: los40.com/tag/los40_music_awards/a/

Television/radio coverage
- Network: Divinity; Mediaset Infinity; Los 40; TNT (Latin America); YouTube

The 21st Los 40 Music Awards, also named Los 40 Music Awards Santander 2026 for sponsorship reasons, will take place on 20 November 2026, at Palau Sant Jordi, Barcelona, to recognize the best in Spanish and international music of 2026.

== Winners and nominees ==
The nominees were revealed on 22 October 2026. Winners will be listed first and highlighted in bold.

**Spain**
| Best Act | Best New Act |
| **Quevedo**; Rosalía; Lola Índigo; Ana Mena; Bad Gyal; Álvaro de Luna | **Chiara Oliver**; Yapi; Metrika; Daniela Blasco; Michael Foster; Lola Tuduri |
| Best Album | Best Song |
| **LUX – Rosalía**; El Baifo – Quevedo; Historias de aquella niña – Leire Martínez; Nexo – Nil Moliner; Más Cara – Bad Gyal; KM0 – Pablo Alborán | **"Superestrella" – Aitana**; "La Graciosa" – Quevedo and Elvis Crespo; "Nexo 01. Me acuerdo de ti" – Nil Moliner; "Dime dónde estás" – Álvaro de Luna; "La Perla" – Rosalía and Yahritza y su Esencia; "Pa ti toa"’ – Ana Mena and Lola Índigo |
| Best Collaboration | Best Music Video |
| **"Pa ti toa" – Ana Mena and Lola Índigo**; "Algo va a pasar" – Quevedo, Juseph, La Pantera and Lucho RK; "El Bachatón de la L" – Lola Índigo and Lucho RK; "Ayer la ví 2026" – Juan Magán and Omar Montes; "Obsesión" – Naiara Moreno and Samurai Jay; "Fashion Girl PT. 2." – Bad Gyal and Jadiel el Incomparable | **"Berghain" – Rosalía, Björk and Yves Tumor**; "Silverado" – Barry B; "Ni Borracho" – Quevedo; "Vámonos de aquí" – Pablo Alborán; "La mitad de la mitad" – La La Love You; "Dios Los Bendiga" – Saiko y Tito el Bambino |
| Best Urban Act | Best Live Act |
| **Lucho RK**; Rels B; César AC; Omar Montes; Aissa; Ptazeta | **Pablo Alborán**; Aitana; Nil Moiner; Ana Mena; Rosalía; Samuraï |
| Best Festival or Event | Best Tour or Concert |
| **Macondo Park, Shakira**; Concert Music Festival; Mad Cool; I Love Reggaetón; Río Babel; Coca-Cola Music Experience | **Cuarto Azul World Tour – Aitana**; Lux Tour – Rosalía; ¿Y ahora qué? – Alejandro Sanz; Gira 2026 – El último de la fila; La Insurrección Tour – Dani Fernández; Más Cara Tour – Bad Gyal |
| Best LOS40 Summer Live Act | Best Del 40 al 1 Act |
| **Depol**; La La Love You; Walls; Enol; Nil Moliner; Adexe y Nau | **Álvaro de Luna**; Vicco; Marlon; Bombai; La Beba; Ruslana |
**International**
| Best Act | Best Tour |
| **Olivia Dean**; Benson Boone; Zara Larsson; Teddy Swims; Tame Impala; Olivia Rodrigo | **Lux Tour – Rosalía**; Midnight Sun Tour – Zara Lasson; After Hours til Dawn Tour – The Weeknd; Monolith Tour – David Guetta; The Romantic Tour – Bruno Mars; Debí Tirar Más Fotos World Tour – Bad Bunny |
| Best Album | Best Song |
| **The Art of Loving – Olivia Dean**; Confessions II – Madonna; The Romantic – Bruno Mars; The Life of a Showgirl – Taylor Swift; Petal – Ariana Grande; You Seem Pretty Sad for a Girl So in Love – Olivia Rodrigo | **"Love Me Not" – Ravyn Lenae**; "Man I Need" – Olivia Dean; "The Fate of Ophelia" – Taylor Swift; "Dracula" – Tame Impala and Jennie; "Ain't in LA" – Adéla; "End of Beginning" – DJO |
**Global Latin**
| Best Act | Best New Act |
| **Camilo**; Romeo Santos y Prince Royce; Manuel Turizo; Yandel; Maluma; Shakira | **Kidd Voodoo**; Aria Vega; Katteyes; MVRK; ROA; Rawayana |
| Best Song | Best Urban Song |
| **"Dardos" – Romero Santos and Prince Royce**; "Por un pendejo no se llora" – Manuel Turizo; "Desde que te tengo" – Carín León; "El árbol" – Camilo; "Dai Dai" – Shakira and Burna Boy; "Te dedico" – Carlos Vives | **"La Villa" – Ryan Castro y Kapo**; "Koko" – Omar Courtz; "Polaroid" – Eladio Carrión; "BBY WOW" – Karol G, Judeline, Rusowsky; "Love" – Clarent; "A Xon De Que" – Feid |
| Best Album | Best Urban Album |
| **Better Late Than Never – Romeo Santos and Prince Royce**; No me arrepiento de sentir tanto" – Karol G; Dónde está el after – Rawayana; "Loco x volver – Maluma; Para cuando sean mayores – Camilo; Free Spirits – CA7RIEL & PACO AMOROSO | **Corsa – Eladio Carrión**; Por si mañana no estoy – Omar Courtz; El Green Print: La Saga – Feid; Do not disturb: Late Checkout – Young Miko; Hopi sendé – Ryan Castro; La Voz Favorita – Jay Wheeler |
| Best Collaboration | Best Urban Collaboration |
| **"Apambichao" – Manuel Turizo and Maluma**; "YAPAQUE" – Farruko, Greeicy and Steve Aoki; "Algo Tú" – Beéle and Shakira; "Dischavate" – Ice Dilan and Rey Tony; "Inglés en Miami" – Rawayana and Manuel Turizo; "Agua" – Maluma and Shakira | **"Pa la seca" – Maluma and Ryan Castro**; "Daddy Yankee: BZRP MUSIC SESSIONS VOL. 0/66" – Daddy Yankee and Bizarrap; "BNB" – Young Miko and Clarent; "De lejitos" (Remix) – Jay Wheeler and Omar Courtz; "Champagne" – Lenny Tavárez and Justin Quiles; "Cuando no era cantante" – El Bogueto and Yung Beef |
| Best Urban Act | Best Live Act |
| **Eladio Carrión**; Young Miko; Clarent; Ryan Castro; El Bogueto; Myke Towers | **Manuel Turizo**; Morat; Camilo; Eladio Carrión; Karol G; Romeo Santos and Prince Royce |
| Best Tour or Concert | Best Music Video |
| **DTMF World Tour – Bad Bunny**; Las Mujeres Ya No Lloran World Tour – Shakira; Sinfónico – Yandel; Better Late Than Never – Romero Santos and Prince Royce; Free Spirits – CA7RIEL and PACO AMOROSO; Lo mismo de la otra vez tour – Mora | **"A Xon De Que" – Feid**; "Agua" – Maluma and Shakira; "Body" – Eladio Carrión; "De lejitos" – Jay Wheeler; "Ojos Brujos" – Clarent y Omar Courtz; "Thank You BB" – Lenny Tavárez and Justin Quiles |
**Global Icon Award**
**Rosalía**; **Romeo Santos**; **Carlos Vives**
**Golden Music Award**
**Estopa**; **Alaska**
| **Spanish Phenomenon Award** | **Colombian Phenomenon Award** |
| **Guitarricadelafuente** | **Kris R** |
