= Lux (Rosalía album) =

2025 studio album by Rosalía

- Standard edition cover

Studio album by Rosalía
- Released: 7 November 2025
- Recorded: 2023–2025
- Studios: AIR (London); A Tempo Estudios (Seville); Conway (Los Angeles); FB House (Miami); La Fabrique (Saint-Rémy); Larrabee (Los Angeles); L'Auditori (Barcelona); Noah's studio (Los Angeles); Provença 115 (Barcelona); Escolania de Montserrat (Montserrat)
- Genres: Orchestral pop; art pop; classical; avant-pop
- Length: 60:03
- Languages: Spanish; English; Arabic; Catalan; French; German; Hebrew; Italian; Japanese; Latin; Mandarin; Portuguese; Sicilian; Ukrainian
- Label: Columbia
- Producers: Rosalía; Caroline Shaw; Douglas Ford; Dylan Wiggins; El Guincho; Elliott Kozel; Jake Miller; Jeff "Gitty" Gitelman; Jordan K. Johnson; LunchMoney Lewis; Michael Pollack; Nija Charles; Noah Goldstein; Pharrell Williams; Stefan Johnson

Rosalía chronology
| Motomami (2022) | Lux (2025) |

Singles from Lux
- 1. "Berghain" Released: 27 October 2025; 2. "La Perla" Released: 5 December 2025; 3. "Sauvignon Blanc" Released: 11 February 2026; 4. "Focu 'Ranni" Released: 17 April 2026

Lux is the fourth studio album by Spanish singer Rosalía, released on 7 November 2025 through Columbia Records. It was recorded with the London Symphony Orchestra under the conduction of Daníel Bjarnason, with Rosalía as its executive producer. The album features guest appearances by Björk, Carminho, Dougie F, Estrella Morente, Sílvia Pérez Cruz, Yahritza y su Esencia, and Yves Tumor. Other collaborators include Angélica Negrón and Caroline Shaw as arrangers, Charlotte Gainsbourg and Guy-Manuel de Homem-Christo as composers, Noah Goldstein and Pharrell Williams as producers, and Venetian Snares as a drum programmer. On its original release, the physical editions contained 18 tracks, while the digital editions omitted three of them. A digital reissue, Lux (Complete Works), was released on 17 April 2026, featuring all 18 tracks.

Described by a press release as exploring lyrical themes of "feminine mystique, transformation, and spirituality", Lux features songs inspired by the lives of various female saints, including Hildegard of Bingen, Rabia Basri, and Miriam, alongside Rosalía's relationship with God, her romantic relationships, and the work of writers Clarice Lispector and Simone Weil. Its track listing is split across four movements, with lyrics in 14 languages, each corresponding to a different female saint. A significant portion of the album's creation, which took between two and three years overall, was dedicated to learning how to sing in the various languages. Rosalía often sketched out rough lyrics with Google Translate before taking her drafts to professional translators and phoneticians.

Lux received unanimous acclaim from music critics, who praised its ambition and orchestral sound. Critics and journalists noted the album's experimental blend of contemporary pop and classical music elements. It later became the second best-reviewed album of 2025 on Metacritic, as well as the site's eighteenth-best album of all time. The album broke the Spotify record for most streams in one day by a female Spanish-language artist, with 42.1 million.

The album's promotion was supported by four singles, "Berghain", "La Perla", "Sauvignon Blanc" and "Focu 'Ranni", and performances at the Brit Awards, Los 40 Music Awards, and the Billboard Latin Women in Music gala. During 2026, Rosalía embarked on the Lux Tour to further promote the record, traveling around Europe, North America and Latin America.

At the 27th Latin Grammy Awards, Lux received seven nominations, with Rosalía winning Album of the Year for the third time and Best Alternative Music Album for the second time. "La Perla" won Song of the Year and Best Pop Song, while "Sauvignon Blanc" received the award for Best Short Form Music Video. Lux also scored eleven nominations at the 69th Annual Grammy Awards, including Album of the Year and Best Alternative Music Album, whilst "Berghain" received a nomination of Record, Song of the Year and Best Music Video. Other songs, including "Sauvingnon Blanc", "Porcelana" and "Reliquia" have also been nominated.

== Background ==
Following the release of her third studio album, Motomami (2022), and its supporting world tour the same year, Rosalía embarked on a twenty-date festival run through the Americas and Europe in 2023. The same year, she released the collaborative extended play RR with her then-fiancé Rauw Alejandro. She released multiple collaborations between 2023 and 2024, including with Björk, Lisa, and Ralphie Choo.

Rosalía first indicated she was working on new material during the promotional week for Motomami, claiming she was already "mapping out ideas" for her fourth project. She began hinting more directly at the album throughout 2024. In a September 2024 interview with Highsnobiety, she stated, "It's been a process. I've changed a lot, but at the same time, I'm still wrapping my head around the same things. It's like I still have the same questions and the same desire to answer them." During Halloween, she wore a costume inspired by the cover art of Imaginal Disk (2024) by Magdalena Bay, which featured a CD inscribed with "R4" on her forehead. She also included "releasing a new album" on a list of New Year's resolutions shared on her Instagram.

In the summer of 2025, Rosalía began teasing her next recording. In June, Hits magazine reported that she had signed with Jonathan Dickins' September Management and that her next album was expected before the end of the year, to be followed by an arena tour in 2026. Throughout August, her Instagram posts included visual motifs such as pentagrams, recording studios, and Catholic art. She later confirmed to Paper that these posts were intentional teasers for her new album. That same month, she was featured on the cover of the September issue of Elle USA, where she stated that her fourth album was not yet finished and that it "doesn't sound like [her] latest album at all". Following an interview, the Spanish edition of Elle published an article leaking the album's planned November release, which was subsequently removed.

On 13 October, she shared the sheet music for the then-unknown "Berghain" on Substack, prompting numerous musicians and fans to post their own interpretations online. The following day, cryptic billboards appeared in Madrid and New York City. On 19 October, she posted a video of herself listening to a live orchestra perform a composition called "Carmesí". The official announcement came the next day, confirming the album's title and release date. The reveal included a Times Square digital billboard and a live broadcast from Rosalía in Callao Square, where she unveiled the cover art on TikTok and Instagram.

== Writing and recording ==
"I approached [Rosalía] with 'Memória'. I came to her with a traditional fado piece, with lyrics I had written myself for my recent album, and I invited her to sing with me on the track. Apparently, she liked the song so much that she asked to include it on her own album. I don't know exactly why she made that decision—she has her own reasons—but I believe there is something in fado, and perhaps the way I work with this tradition, that resonates with her. The lyrics are written as a direct conversation, asking: 'Do you remember me? Do you recognise me? After all these years, am I still the same?' And then, by the end, you realize that the person has been speaking to her own heart—to herself. She is asking, 'Do you remember me? Are you still the same?'"

— Carminho, speaking to Dazed

The New York Times described the album creation process as taking "more than two years", while Billboard described it as "the better part of three years".

Much of the album's creation was spent researching how to write and sing in other languages, often starting out by experimenting with Google Translate before presenting rough drafts to professional translators, phonetics teachers, and music industry peers. Speaking about the process, Rosalía said: "It's a lot of intuition and trying to be like, I'm going to just write and let's see how these will sound in another language." She also emphasised that no artificial intelligence was used. Charlotte Gainsbourg provided linguistic input for the track "Jeanne", as did Justice for "Sauvignon Blanc". Rosalía said the album was created "97%" by herself. The track "Mio Cristo Piange Diamanti" in particular took a year and was created in Miami and Los Angeles.

The album's recording sessions took place from 2023 to 2025 in France, Spain, the United Kingdom, and the United States. Dazed interviewed some of Lux's collaborators. Carminho brought the song "Memória" to Rosalía; reflecting on the collaboration, she said: "We simply had fun together, and in the end, I feel deeply honored and proud that an artist like Rosalía chose to sing traditional fado, and to sing it in Portuguese so beautifully." Conductor Daníel Bjarnason revealed that he met Rosalía for the first time when arriving for the album's first recording sessions, stating: "It's different from anything else I’ve ever worked on—I think Rosalía is pushing a lot of boundaries, both internally and externally. She was extremely hands-on and involved in the recording process with the orchestra and she really felt every single note that was being played. She has a strong intuition and sense of what she wants but is at the same time very open to new ideas and experimentation." Yahritza y su Esencia revealed that they first came into contact with Rosalía just a few months before the album was finished when she approached them with "La Perla" and asked them to perform on it.

== Concept ==
"There's a whole intentional structure throughout the album. I was clear that I wanted four movements. I wanted one where it would be more a departure from purity. The second movement, I wanted it to feel more like being in gravity, being friends with the world. The third would be more about grace and hopefully being friends with God. And at the end, the farewell, the return. All of that helped me be very strategic and concise and precise about what songs would go where, how I wanted it to start, how I wanted the journey to go, what lyrics would make sense.

Each story, each song is inspired by the story of a saint. I read a lot of hagiographies—the lives of the saints—and it helped me expand my understanding of sainthood. Because my background is Catholic from my family, so you understand it through this one [lens]. But then you realize that in other cultures and other religious contexts, it's another thing. But what surprised me a lot was that there's a main theme, which is not fearing, which you can find shared across many religions. And I think that's so powerful because probably the fears that I have, somebody on the other side of the world has the same ones. And for me, there's beauty in that, in understanding that we might think that we're different, but we're not."

— Rosalía, speaking to Billboard

Lux is Latin for light. At the album's listening party in New York City, the phrases "When was the last time you were in complete darkness?" and "Sometimes being in complete darkness is the best way to find the light." were projected onto a giant white sheet before the music began. Maria Sherman of the Associated Press speculated that the title is furthermore an allusion to luxury (Catalan: luxe), representing the grand and orchestral sound of the album. The album cover depicts Rosalía against a blue background in a white outfit resembling a nun's religious habit and veil. Her eyes are closed, her lips are coloured gold, and she is hugging herself with her arms underneath the outfit's torso. Daniel Neira of Hola! USA and Violaine Schütz of Numéro both compared the outfit to a straitjacket. Speaking to Dazed, album cover photographer Noah Dillon said he was approached in late 2024 by Rosalía and her sister Pili, adding: "I think to truly understand Lux visually, you need to look at the vinyl foldout as well —there are nearly eighty images that contextualize the record."

Speaking to Le Monde, Rosalía cited historical texts about the lives of female saints, as well as the writing of French philosopher Simone Weil and Brazilian author Clarice Lispector, as her biggest lyrical inspirations for the album. She also praised language-learning as a tool: "I wanted to sing in other languages, I wanted to understand other cultures better, study more". Rosalía, whose native languages are Catalan and Spanish, sings in an additional twelve languages on Lux: Arabic, English, French, German, Hebrew, Italian, Japanese, Latin, Mandarin, Portuguese, Sicilian, and Ukrainian. Daniela Swidrak of Rolling Stone Brasil emphasised in her review that the album's languages aren't used for one-off lines but are given their own fleshed-out moments, with entire songs sung in languages that Rosalía doesn't speak natively. The chosen languages and their placements correspond to the life and stories of particular saints that provided inspiration. Specific inspirations include the Christian saints Hildegard of Bingen and Olga of Kiev, the Sufi Muslim mystic Rabia Basri, Jewish prophet Miriam, and Buddhist nun Vimala. Rosalía noted that many of these saints came from violent or materialistic circumstances to progress on their path to sainthood.

A press release described the album as "[tracing] a widescreen emotional arc of feminine mystique, transformation, and spirituality—moving between intimacy and operatic scale to create a radiant world where sound, language, and culture fuse as one." In an interview, Rosalía—who comes from a Christian background but has said that she does not adhere to any particular religion—talked about the influence of her belief in God on the album: "I think I've always felt like I have a very personal connection and relationship with spirituality and with God […] I feel like God has given me so much, the least I could do is make an album for him. I'm giving back." When an NPR journalist said that the album's heavy religious iconography felt "spiritual […] in a different way", Rosalía said she was more interested in mysticism and conveying her personal journey than fitting in with any particular religious codes. She went on to say that the track "La Yugular" was inspired by studying Islam. The album is not entirely about religious themes, with multiple songs about the singer's personal growth in life. The New York Times describes the album as "a labor of love exploring the feminine divine and the brutalities of romance." Alexis Petridis of The Guardian wrote that "you get the sense that somewhere in the mix of stuff about God, Catholicism, beatification, and transcendence lurks the more earthy theme of an ex-boyfriend getting it in the neck". Several journalists drew comparison between the album's songs about heartbreak and failed romances and her real-life, public relationships. (Note: Such as Maria Sherman of the Associated Press, Kaelen Bell of Exclaim!, and Aureliano Tone of Le Monde.)

== Music and lyrics ==
Pitchfork described the album variously as "orchestral pop" and "avant-garde classical pop." Some critics and journalists called Lux a classical music album, (Note: Such as Aureliano Tonet of Le Monde, Anamaria Sayre of NPR, and Will Hodgkinson of The Times) while others called it a pop, art pop, or avant-pop album with classical influences. (Note: Such as Maria Sherman of the Associated Press, Kaelen Bell of Exclaim!, and Joe Coscarelli and Jon Caramanica of The New York Times) Movement, the term used for the subdivisions of the album's track listing, is associated with classical music, and Rosalía said that the track "Mio Cristo Piange Diamanti" was an attempt to emulate an aria. Alexis Petridis wrote: "A debate is raging about whether or not the contents of Lux could be described as classical music […] [W]hether you want to label it as such or not, Lux certainly sounds closer to classical music than it does to anything in the charts. There are definitely pop elements to these songs […] but these elements never feel central to Lux's sound. Quite the opposite: they seem like oddly spectral presences, drifting through an alien landscape."

== Release and promotion ==
=== Promotional events ===
Twenty pre-release listening parties were thrown, attended by fans who applied through Rosalía's website; eighteen took place on 5 November. Rosalía attended three of the listening parties: Mexico City, New York City, and Barcelona. Following the Mexico City party on 29 October, Rosalía travelled around the city with musical group Latin Mafia while uploading clips of the outing to social media. Rolling Stone subsequently published an opinion piece speculating that a collaboration between the artists is on the way. The New York City party on 1 November included several celebrity attendees; Vanity Fair writer Chris Murphy estimated one hundred people were at the event. Fans were given Lux-branded lighters before departing. The Barcelona party on 5 November was held at the Museu Nacional d'Art de Catalunya. As guests entered, Rosalía was lying still in the middle of the room, covered in a large spread of rippled white cloth. It was estimated that there were nine hundred attendees. On 30 November, Rosalía hosted another listening party in front of the Christ the Redeemer statue, in Río de Janeiro.

In promotion of the album, Rosalía was interviewed by Zane Lowe of Apple Music, Nick Grimshaw of BBC Radio 6 Music, Lyndsey Havens of Billboard, El País's Xavi Sancho, Mehdi Maïzi of France Inter, Laura Snapes of The Guardian, Aureliano Tonet of Le Monde, Cristina Boscá and Dani Moreno of Anda Ya by Los 40, Leyre Guerrero of Radio 3, Magnolia Magazine, Mariana Enriquez for Spotify, Nicolás Occhiato and Ángela Torres of Luzu TV, Jon Caramanica and Joe Coscarelli of Popcast by The New York Times, Nouvelle Radio Jeune, and Anamaria Sayre of NPR. She also appeared on SubwayTakes with Kareem Rahma. On the day of the album's release, she performed "Reliquia" as the opening of the 2025 edition of the Los 40 Music Awards. Further promotional events include an interview with David Broncano of La revuelta on 10 November, an interview and performance of "La Perla" on The Tonight Show with Jimmy Fallon on 16 November, and an interview with Mario Pergolini on Otro Día Perdido on 28 November.

=== Singles and music videos ===
The lead single, "Berghain", was released on 27 October 2025, accompanied by a music video directed by Nicolas Méndez. It features lyrics in English, German, and Spanish. "Reliquia" was briefly released to streaming service Spotify on 4 November before being deleted the same day; Rosalía's team did not publicly address the upload and if it was an error.

"La Perla" was sent to radio stations in Italy on 5 December 2025, as the album's second single. Its music video, directed by Stillz, was released on 16 December.

"Sauvignon Blanc" was released as a digital single with a cappella and instrumental versions of the song on 11 February 2026. A music video directed by Noah Dillon was released the same day.

=== Tour ===
On 4 December, the Lux Tour was officially announced, with concerts in Europe, South and North America between March and September 2026. It marked her first concert tour since the 2022 Motomami World Tour.

== Critical reception ==
Professional ratings
Aggregate scores
| Source | Rating |
|---|---|
| AnyDecentMusic? | 9.2/10 |
| Metacritic | 95/100 |
Review scores
| Source | Rating |
| AllMusic | 4.5/5 stars |
| Clash | 9/10 |
| Consequence | A+ |
| Exclaim! | 8/10 |
| The Guardian | 5/5 stars |
| MusicOMH | 5/5 stars |
| NME | 5/5 stars |
| Pitchfork | 8.6/10 |
| Rolling Stone | 5/5 stars |
| Slant Magazine | 5/5 stars |

Lux received "universal acclaim" from music critics, according to the review aggregator Metacritic, based on a weighted average score of 95 out of 100 from 17 critic scores, becoming the site's best-reviewed album of 2025. The review aggregator AnyDecentMusic? assigned the album a weighted average score of 9.2 out of 10 from 19 critic scores.

The Associated Press's Maria Sherman gave the album four-stars-and-a-half out of five, praising the album's disconnect from contemporary trends, calling it "far more complex and iconoclastic than obvious", and stating that "there are real pleasures to be unearthed" for attentive listeners. The BBC's Mark Savage suggested the album as the best of the year, praising it as "a thoroughly modern album, with cutting edge production and hip-hop phrasing sneaking into Rosalía's stunning, operatic vocals." Clash's Shahzaib Hussain gave the album a score of nine out of ten, calling it "an antidote to viral soundbites and music's instant-grat monomania." Consequence's Wren Graves gave the album a score of A−, writing: "Rosalía leaves us in a place mentioned by no prophets and described by no poets. A place none of us have been before, imagined by no one but herself, and perhaps her God."

Die Zeit's Jens Balzer declared Rosalía to be pop's "new goddess" and praised the emotionality of the album, stating that it's difficult to listen without crying. Dork's Stephen Ackroyd gave the album a score of five out of five, writing: "What lingers isn't the guest list or the language tally. It's authority. A singer at full stretch without strain. A writer and arranger who knows when to hold and when to let go. Lux doesn't shout its ambition; it builds it where the weight can be felt most. It's hard to imagine anyone else making this record, even harder still to imagine they could possibly pull it off. An indefinable talent, Rosalía remains firmly in her own tier." Exclaim!'s Kaelen Bell gave the album a score of eight out of ten, calling it "a genuinely overwhelming experience" and praising its balancing of its grand sound with "small strokes of humanity and humour". The Financial Times's Ludovic Hunter-Tilney gave the album four stars out of five, saying it "arrives with the kind of conceptual grandeur that would make a prog rock band jealous", praising Rosalía's vocals as "expressive, swooping up and down the scale", and concluding that "Rosalía has constructed an ambitious and unusual tribute to the European song tradition, from opera house to nightclub."

The Guardian's Alexis Petridis gave the album five stars out of five, calling it a "truly compelling, involving experience" and praising Rosalía's vocals as "spectacular firework displays of talent". British GQ's Josiah Gogarty praised the album's ability to be experimental while retaining accessibility and "moments of straightforward melodic beauty", concluding that it is "relentlessly modern and forward-looking in its cross-genre scope and cultural curiosity." The Independent's Roisin O'Connor gave the album five stars out of five, declaring it a masterpiece and writing: "Each song erupts from the former, constantly shifting and evolving in sound while maintaining a powerful throughline in theme and production." The Irish Times's Ed Power gave the album four stars out of five, calling it "stunningly avant-garde" and "fearless, confrontational, and confidently unconventional" with "extraordinary sounds". Mondo Sonoro's Yeray S. Iborra gave the album a score of eight out of ten, praising the detailed production. NME's Rhian Daly gave the album five stars out of five, calling it a masterpiece and writing that it "continuously stops you dead in your tracks, encourages curiosity, and builds a new world for you to dive into, while connecting to the sounds of all of Rosalía’s previous releases." NRC's Peter van der Ploeg gave the album five marks out of five, praising the album's bombastic energy. The Observer's Kitty Empire wrote that the album is an "unapologetically ambitious, hybrid undertaking" with "megawatts of splendour" that "places [Rosalía] firmly in the conversation surrounding great female auteurs such as Kate Bush and Björk". Pitchfork's Gio Santiago called it "a heartfelt offering of avant-garde classical pop that roars through genre, romance, and religion." Riff's Sery Morales gave the album a score of nine out of ten, calling it a "prismatic", "transcendent", "expansive", and "demanding" work.

Rolling Stone's Julyssa Lopez gave the album five stars out of five, calling it "a transcendent album that sounds like nothing else in music right now" and "a gorgeous, gutting package that feels like a truly timeless work of art." Rolling Stone Brasil's Daniela Swidrak gave the album five stars out of five, praising album's ambitious use of language and bold musical direction. Rolling Stone Philippines's Elijah Pareño gave the album four stars out of five, calling it "a record that invites you to listen again, and again, until its light fully reveals itself." Rolling Stone UK's Will Richards gave the album five stars out of five, calling it "a shocking and sublime left turn" that is "both laser-focused and undefinable." Slant Magazine's Steve Erickson gave the album four stars out of five, writing that the album is "ambitious, challenging, and provocative" and "rewards patience". The Times's Will Hodgkinson gave the album five stars out of five, emphasising it as necessarily a full-attention listen and calling it "a grand cathedral of an album in which familiar themes […] are tackled in a way that is deeply traditional and strikingly original." Variety's Thania Garcia referred to the album as a "spiritual odyssey" and wrote that "the instrumentals are as intricate and lush as [Rosalía's] fervent vocal runs". Vogue Singapore's Shyra Jamal called the album "a fully immersive masterpiece" and "a masterclass in artistry", writing that every song contains several memorable moments and praising Rosalía's "striking" vocals. Wonderland's Moira González wrote that the album "turns listening into a sacred experience."

Lux also attracted the attention of the Prime Minister of Spain Pedro Sánchez, who first praised it on his official X (formerly Twitter) account and later on Radio 3's show Generación Ya. The album was also praised by members of the Catholic Church, including Xabier Gómez García, bishop of Sant Feliu de Llobregat, whose diocese includes Rosalía's hometown Sant Esteve Sesrovires. Gómez García claimed that some songs were "provocative" but acknowledged that Rosalía "peaks with absolute freedom and without hang-ups about what she feels God to be, and the desire, the thirst (to know God)." Cardinal José Tolentino de Mendonça, prefect of the Dicastery for Culture and Education, also praised the album.

== Accolades ==
Awards and nominations for Lux
| Year | Organization | Award | Result | Ref. |
|---|---|---|---|---|
| 2026 | American Music Awards | Favorite Latin Album | Nominated | |
| 2026 | Billboard Latin Music Awards | Top Latin Album of the Year | Nominated | |
| 2026 | Billboard Latin Music Awards | Top Latin Pop Album of the Year | Won | |
| 2026 | Latin Grammy Awards | Album of the Year | Won | |
| 2026 | Latin Grammy Awards | Best Alternative Music Album | Won | |
| 2026 | Latin Grammy Awards | Best Engineered Album | Won | |
| 2026 | Los 40 Music Awards | Best Spanish Album | Won | |
| 2026 | Premios de la Academia de Música | Album of the Year | Won | |
| 2026 | Premios de la Academia de Música | Producer of the Year | Won | |
| 2026 | Premios de la Academia de Música | Best Pop Album | Won | |
| 2026 | Premios Odeón | Album of the Year | Won | |
| 2027 | Grammy Awards | Album of the Year | Pending | |
| 2027 | Grammy Awards | Best Alternative Music Album | Pending | |
| 2027 | Grammy Awards | Best Engineered Album, Non-Classical | Pending | |

=== Year-end lists ===
Select critical rankings for Lux
| Publication | List | Rank | Ref. |
|---|---|---|---|
| Billboard | The 50 Best Albums of 2025 | 2 | |
| Business Insider | The Best Albums of 2025 | 1 | |
| Clash | Albums of the Year 2025 | 2 | |
| Consequence | The 50 Best Albums of 2025 | 1 | |
| Dazed | The 20 Best Albums of 2025 | 1 | |
| Entertainment Weekly | The 10 Best Albums of 2025 | 1 | |
| The Guardian | The 50 Best Albums of 2025 | 1 | |
| The Independent | The 20 Best Albums of 2025 | 1 | |
| NPR | Robin Hilton's Top 10 Albums of 2025 | 1 | |
| PopMatters | The 80 Best Albums of 2025 | 1 | |

== Commercial performance ==
Lux debuted at number 4 on the Billboard 200 with over 46,000 album-equivalent units, including 19,000 in pure album sales, making it her first top 10 album on that list. Across Europe, Lux debuted at number 1 in Spain and received platinum certification simultaneously (becoming her fourth chart-topping project and third chart-topping album in her home country), number 2 in Germany and France, number 4 in Italy and Ireland, and number 7 in Sweden. In the United Kingdom, the album debuted at number 4 on the Official Charts Company, becoming the highest-charting album ever by a Spanish female artist in that market. In Australia the album debuted at number 15 on the ARIA Albums Chart.

The album also earned 42.1 million streams on Spotify in its first full tracking day, breaking the record for most first-day Spotify streams by a female Spanish-language artist, and charting twelve of its fifteen available tracks in Spotify's daily list of top fifty most-streamed songs globally. Of those twelve, six appeared in the top twenty.

== Track listing ==
All lyrics by Rosalía Vila Tobella, except for "Sauvignon Blanc" (lyrics by Rosalía and Andrew Wyatt) and "Memória" (lyrics by Rosalía and Maria "Carminho" Andrade).

First movement
| No. | Title | Music | Producer(s) | Length |
|---|---|---|---|---|
| 1. | "Sexo, Violencia y Llantas" | Rosalía; David Rodríguez; Dylan Wiggins; Noah Goldstein | Rosalía; Goldstein; Wiggins | 2:20 |
| 2. | "Reliquia" | Rosalía; Goldstein; Rodríguez; Wiggins; Caroline Shaw; Guy-Manuel de Homem-Christo; Ryan Tedder | Rosalía; Goldstein; Shaw; Wiggins | 3:49 |
| 3. | "Divinize" | Rosalía; Goldstein; Rodríguez; Wiggins; Jake Miller | Rosalía; Goldstein; Shaw; Wiggins | 4:03 |
| 4. | "Porcelana" (with Dougie F) | Rosalía; Goldstein; Rodríguez; Wiggins; Carter Lang; Elliott Kozel; Douglas Ford | Rosalía; Goldstein; Kozel; Wiggins; Ford | 4:07 |
| 5. | "Mio Cristo Piange Diamanti" | Rosalía | Rosalía; Goldstein; Wiggins | 4:29 |

Second movement
| No. | Title | Music | Producer(s) | Length |
|---|---|---|---|---|
| 6. | "Berghain" (with Björk and Yves Tumor) | Rosalía; Björk; Goldstein; Miller; Wiggins | Rosalía; Goldstein; Miller; Wiggins | 2:58 |
| 7. | "La Perla" (with Yahritza y su Esencia) | Rosalía; Goldstein; Rodríguez; Tedder; Wiggins | Rosalía; Goldstein; Wiggins | 3:15 |
| 8. | "Mundo Nuevo" | | Rosalía; Goldstein; Wiggins | 2:20 |
| 9. | "De Madrugá" | Rosalía; Pablo "El Guincho" Díaz-Reixa; Pharrell Williams | Rosalía; El Guincho; Goldstein; Williams | 1:44 |

Third movement
| No. | Title | Music | Producer(s) | Length |
|---|---|---|---|---|
| 10. | "Dios Es un Stalker" | Rosalía; Goldstein; Rodríguez; Wiggins | Rosalía; Goldstein; Wiggins | 2:57 |
| 11. | "La Yugular" | Rosalía; Goldstein; Kozel; Wiggins; Tobias Jesso Jr. | Rosalía; Goldstein; Kozel; Wiggins | 4:18 |
| 12. | "Focu 'Ranni" | Rosalía | Rosalía; Goldstein; Kozel; Wiggins; Jeff "Gitty" Gitelman; Jordan K. Johnson; LunchMoney Lewis; Michael Pollack; Nija Charles; Stefan Johnson | 2:50 |
| 13. | "Sauvignon Blanc" | Rosalía; Goldstein; Wiggins; Andrew Wyatt; Terius "The-Dream" Gesteelde-Diamant | Rosalía; Goldstein; Wiggins | 2:42 |
| 14. | "Jeanne" | Rosalía; Goldstein; Miller; Rodríguez; Wiggins; Charlotte Gainsbourg | Rosalía; Goldstein; Wiggins | 3:51 |

Fourth movement
| No. | Title | Music | Producer(s) | Length |
|---|---|---|---|---|
| 15. | "Novia Robot" | Rosalía; Kozel; Wiggins; Carlos "Chris Jedi" Ortiz | Rosalía; Goldstein; Kozel; Wiggins | 3:12 |
| 16. | "La Rumba del Perdón" (with Estrella Morente and Sílvia Pérez Cruz) | Rosalía; Díaz-Reixa; Goldstein; Kozel; Rodríguez; Wiggins; Dani De Gomez | Rosalía; Goldstein; Wiggins | 4:11 |
| 17. | "Memória" (with Carminho) | Rosalía; Wiggins; Armando Machado; Maria "Carminho" Andrade | Rosalía; Goldstein; Shaw; Wiggins | 3:45 |
| 18. | "Magnolias" | Rosalía; Goldstein; Wiggins; Daniel Wilson; Danny Casio; Matthew Maltese; Sophie May Jackson | Rosalía; Goldstein; Wiggins | 3:14 |
| Total length: | | | | 60:03 |

Notes

- The standard digital edition of Lux doesn't include "Focu 'Ranni", "Jeanne", or "Novia Robot".
- The standard digital edition of Lux includes a different version of "Dios Es un Stalker", with a duration of 2:10. The song is a different take, has a lower key, and doesn't include the second chorus or bridge.
- The 2:57 version of "Dios Es un Stalker" is subtitled "(versión Francotiradora)" on the digital Complete Works edition of Lux.
- "Mio Cristo Piange Diamanti" is titled "Mio Cristo" on physical editions of the album.
- "Mundo Nuevo" has no credited composers, only arrangers; it is listed as a traditional composition.
- "Berghain" includes the lyrical phrase "I'll fuck you till you love me", originally spoken by Mike Tyson.
- "La Yugular" includes an audio sample of Patti Smith.
- "Reliquia" was inspired by Saint Rose of Lima.
- "Porcelana" was inspired by Ryōnen Gensō.
- "Mio Cristo Piange Diamanti" was inspired by Clare of Assisi.
- "Berghain" was inspired by Hildegard of Bingen and Vimala.
- "De Madrugá" was inspired by Saint Olga of Kiev.
- "La Yugular" was inspired by Rabia Al-Adawiya.
- "Focu 'Ranni" was inspired by Saint Rosalia of Palermo.
- "Sauvignon Blanc" was inspired by Saint Teresa of Ávila (Teresa of Jesus).
- "Jeanne" was inspired by Joan of Arc.
- "Novia Robot" was inspired by Sun Bu'er and Miriam.
- "Magnolias" was inspired by Anandamayi Ma.

== Credits ==
These credits have been adapted from the album's credits page on Rosalía's website. Additional sources indicate that Rosalía is the album's executive producer, that Dougie F contributed to "Porcelana", that Anthro programmed drums on "La Perla", and that Gaspard Augé and Xavier de Rosnay assisted with translation on "Sauvignon Blanc".

=== Personnel ===
- Rosalía – composition (1–7, 9–18), arrangement (8), lyrics, performance, production, vocal production (all)
- Aaron Funk – drum programming (2)
- Aaron Paris – viola, violin (1, 11, 15–16)
- Albert Cusell – background vocals (7)
- Andrew Wyatt – composition, lyrics (13)
- Angélica Negrón – arrangement (3, 10, 14)
- Armando Machado – composition (17)
- Asa Kanaseki – Japanese translation (4)
- Ashok Klouda – cello (2, 5)
- Ben Sedano – assistant recording (9)
- Björk – performance, composition (6)
- Bob Jackson – mastering (all)
- Brian Lee – mastering (all)
- Carlota Guerrero – background vocals (7)
- Carminho – performance, composition, lyrics (17)
- Caroline Shaw – composition (2), arrangement (2–3, 16–17), production (2–3, 17), additional production (18)
- Carter Lang – composition (4)
- Charlotte Gainsbourg – composition (14)
- Chris Jedi – composition (15)
- Cor de Cambra del Palau de la Música Catalana – choir (2–6, 10–12, 17–18)
- Dani De Gomez – composition (16)
- Daniel Aged – bass (10)
- Daníel Bjarnason – conducting (all)
- Daniel Cayotte – recording (2, 6–8, 12–14, 16, 18)
- Daniel López – arrangement (5, 13, 18)
- Daniel Wilson – composition (18)
- Danny Casio – composition (18)
- David Rodríguez – composition (1–4, 7, 14, 16), additional production, vocal production, recording (all)
- Dylan Wiggins – composition (1–4, 6–7, 10–11, 13–18), arrangement (8, 18), production (1–8, 10–18), additional production (9)
- El Guincho – composition (9, 16), production (9)
- Elliott Kozel – composition (4, 11, 15–16), arrangement (1, 3–4, 6, 8, 11–12, 15–16, 18), production (4, 11–12, 15), additional production (1, 3, 8, 14)
- Escolania de Montserrat – choir (2–4, 14, 16–18)
- Estrella Morente – performance (16)
- Flamenco Ladies Choir – choir (1, 9, 16, 18)
- Flamenco Gentlemen Choir – choir (16)
- Francesco Di Giovanni – assistant mixing (1–10, 15–17)
- Gabriel Ventura – Latin translation (4)
- Gaetano Cipolla – Sicilian translation (12)
- Ganna Bodgan Choir – choir (9)
- Guy-Manuel de Homem-Christo – composition (2)
- Halyna Hrabovska – Ukrainian translation (9)
- Harry Wilson – recording (all)
- If A Bird Germany – choir (6)
- Isaac Diskin – recording (all)
- Jake Miller – composition (3, 6, 14), arrangement (1, 3, 6, 8, 14, 18), production (6), additional production (2–3, 5, 8, 10–11, 14, 16–17), mixing (6), recording (1–4, 6–18)
- Jeff "Gitty" Gitelman – production (12)
- Jesús Bola – arrangement (8–9)
- Joan Albert Amargós – arrangement (14–15)
- Jordan K. Johnson – production (12)
- Joselito Acedo – guitar (16)
- Kyle Gordon – score transcription (all)
- Lisa Salker – German translation (6)
- London Symphony Orchestra – orchestral instrumentation (all)
- Luisina Sanchez – background vocals (7)
- LunchMoney Lewis – production (12)
- Magdalena Filipczak – violin (5)
- Makarines – palmas (12–13), arrangement (9, 16), additional production (4)
- Manny Marroquin – mixing (1–10, 15–17)
- Mark Gamal – Arabic translation (11)
- Matt Maltese – composition (18)
- Michael Pollack – production (12)
- Mike Larson – recording (9)
- Moises Horta – vocal production (4)
- Natalie Klouda – violin (2, 5)
- Nigel Godrich – mixing (4, 14)
- Nija Charles – production (12)
- Noah Goldstein – composition (1–4, 6–7, 10–11, 13–14, 16–18), arrangement (6, 8), production (all)
- Oscar Lagos – guitar (16)
- Pedro Ricardo Miño – additional production (4)
- Pharrell Williams – composition, production (9)
- Pili Vila – background vocals (7)
- Ramiro Fernandez-Seoane – assistant mixing (1–10, 15–17)
- Ryan Tedder – composition (2, 7)
- Samuel Pankhurst – contrabass (11)
- Sílvia Pérez Cruz – performance (16)
- Sophie May Jackson – composition (18)
- Sora Lopez – cello (1, 11, 15)
- Stefan Johnson – production (12)
- The-Dream – composition (13)
- Tobias Jesso Jr. – composition (11)
- Tom Elmhirst – mixing (11–13, 18)
- Tristan Hoogland – recording (all)
- Vanessa Amara – arrangement (1, 7, 18)
- Yahritza y su Esencia – performance (7)
- Yves Tumor – performance (6)

=== Studios ===
- AIR Studios (London, United Kingdom)
- A Tempo Estudios (Seville, Spain)
- Conway Recording Studios (Los Angeles, United States)
- FB House (Miami, United States)
- La Fabrique (Saint-Rémy-de-Provence, France)
- Larrabee Studios (Los Angeles, United States)
- L'Auditori (Barcelona, Spain)
- Noah Goldstein's studio (Los Angeles, United States)
- Provença 115 (Barcelona, Spain)
- Santa Maria de Montserrat Abbey (Monistrol de Montserrat, Spain)

== Charts ==
=== Weekly charts ===
Weekly chart performance
| Chart (2025–2026) | Peak position |
|---|---|
| Argentine Albums (CAPIF) | 3 |
| Australian Albums (ARIA) | 15 |
| Austrian Albums (Ö3 Austria) | 1 |
| Belgian Albums (Ultratop Flanders) | 1 |
| Belgian Albums (Ultratop Wallonia) | 1 |
| Canadian Albums (Billboard) | 8 |
| Croatian International Albums (HDU) | 15 |
| Danish Albums (Hitlisten) | 4 |
| Dutch Albums (Album Top 100) | 2 |
| Finnish Albums (Suomen virallinen lista) | 10 |
| French Albums (SNEP) | 2 |
| German Albums (Offizielle Top 100) | 2 |
| German Pop Albums (Offizielle Top 100) | 1 |
| Greek Albums (IFPI) | 7 |
| Hungarian Albums (MAHASZ) | 14 |
| Icelandic Albums (Tónlistinn) | 5 |
| Irish Albums (Official Charts) | 4 |
| Italian Albums (FIMI) | 4 |
| Japanese Western Albums (Oricon) | 14 |
| Japanese Download Albums (Billboard Japan) | 75 |
| Japanese Top Albums Sales (Billboard Japan) | 69 |
| Lithuanian Albums (AGATA) | 7 |
| New Zealand Albums (RMNZ) | 11 |
| Norwegian Albums (IFPI Norge) | 9 |
| Polish Albums (ZPAV) | 4 |
| Portuguese Albums (AFP) | 1 |
| Scottish Albums (Official Charts) | 4 |
| Spanish Albums (Promusicae) | 1 |
| Swedish Albums (Sverigetopplistan) | 7 |
| Swiss Albums (Schweizer Hitparade) | 1 |
| UK Albums (Official Charts) | 4 |
| US Billboard 200 | 4 |
| US Top Classical Albums (Billboard) | 1 |
| US Top Latin Albums (Billboard) | 1 |
| US World Albums (Billboard) | 1 |

=== Year-end charts ===
Year-end chart performance
| Chart (2025) | Position |
|---|---|
| Austrian Albums (Ö3 Austria) | 64 |
| Belgian Albums (Ultratop Flanders) | 41 |
| Belgian Albums (Ultratop Wallonia) | 92 |
| French Albums (SNEP) | 77 |
| Spanish Albums (PROMUSICAE) | 2 |
| Swiss Albums (Schweizer Hitparade) | 11 |

== Certifications ==
Certifications
| Region | Certification | Certified units/sales |
|---|---|---|
| Belgium (BRMA) | Gold | 10,000^{‡} |
| France (SNEP) | Platinum | 100,000^{‡} |
| Italy (FIMI) | Gold | 25,000^{‡} |
| Mexico (AMPROFON) | Gold | 70,000^{‡} |
| Netherlands (NVPI) | Gold | 18,600^{‡} |
| Portugal (AFP) | 3× Platinum | 21,000^{‡} |
| Spain (Promusicae) | 6× Platinum | 240,000^{‡} |
| United Kingdom (BPI) | Silver | 60,000^{‡} |
^{‡} Sales+streaming figures based on certification alone.

== Release history ==
Release dates and formats
| Region | Date | Format(s) | Label | Tracks | Ref. |
|---|---|---|---|---|---|
| Various | 7 November 2025 | CD; LP | Columbia | 18 | |
| Various | 7 November 2025 | Digital download; streaming | Columbia | 15 | |
| Various | 17 April 2026 | Digital download; streaming | Columbia | 18 | |
