= Sauvignon Blanc (song) =

Single by Rosalía

from the album Lux
- Released: 11 February 2026
- Recorded: 2024–2025
- Studio: Larrabee Sound (Los Angeles); Noah's Studio (Los Angeles); FB House (Miami); AIR (London); La Fabrique (Saint-Rémy-de-Provence)
- Length: 2:42
- Label: Columbia
- Songwriters: Rosalía Vila Tobella; Andrew Wyatt Blakemore; Terius Adamu Ya Gesteelde-Diamant; Noah Goldstein; Dylan Patrice Wiggins
- Producers: Dylan Wiggins; Noah Goldstein; Rosalía

Rosalía singles chronology
"La Perla" (2025)	"Sauvignon Blanc" (2026)	"Focu 'Ranni" (2026)

Music video
- "Sauvignon Blanc" on YouTube

"Sauvignon Blanc" is a song by Spanish singer-songwriter Rosalía. It was released on 11 February 2026 as the third single from her fourth studio album, Lux (2025). It was sent to Italian radio on 13 February 2026 as the album's third single.

== Background and composition ==
The song was written by the singer herself with Andrew Wyatt, Terius Adamu Ya Gesteelde-Diamant Noah Goldstein and Noah Goldstein. In an interview with Genius, Rosalía explained that the song was inspired by Teresa of Ávila's decision of "renounce all material possessions". The singer also described the producing process as "an ethereal ballad containing a self-ironic promise". During a promotional interview for the album, Rosalía revealed that the French music duo Justice gave her suggestions on how to correctly pronounce the name of the wine that gives the song its title.

== Music video ==
The music video, directed by Noah Dillon, premiered on Rosalía's official YouTube channel on 11 February 2026. In November 2026, the music video was awarded Best Short Form Music Video at the 27th Annual Latin Grammy Awards.

== Accolades ==
Select list of awards and nominations for Berghain
Year	Organization	Award	Result	Ref.
2026	Latin Grammy Awards	Best Short Form Music Video	Won	
2027	Grammy Awards	Best Pop Solo Performance	Pending	

== Track listing ==
- Digital download and streaming
1. "Sauvignon Blanc" – 2:42
2. "Sauvignon Blanc" (a cappella) – 2:48
3. "Sauvignon Blanc" (instrumental) – 2:42

== Charts ==
Chart performance
Chart (2026)	Peak position
Global 200 (Billboard)	190
Portugal (AFP)	22
Spain (Promusicae)	14
US Hot Latin Songs (Billboard)	28

== Certifications ==
Certifications
Region	Certification	Certified units/sales
Spain (Promusicae)	Gold	50,000^{‡}
^{‡} Sales+streaming figures based on certification alone.

== Release history ==
Release dates and formats
Region	Date	Format	Label	Ref.
Various	11 February 2026	Digital download; streaming	Columbia	
Italy	13 February 2026	Radio airplay	Sony Italy	
