= PopLyfe =

American pop group

- Origin: Oakland, California, U.S.
- Genres: Pop, R&B
- Years active: 2010–2012
- Past members: Kehlani Parrish, Dylan Wiggins, Jaden Wiggins, Dillon Ingram, Denzel Merritt, Ali-Khan Lochin

PopLyfe (also stylized in all caps) was a teen pop band from Oakland, California, that was a contestant on season 6 of America's Got Talent. They finished in fourth place on the show after performing a medley by Queen in the finals.

The band's members were Kehlani Parrish, Dylan Wiggins, Jaden Wiggins, Dillon Ingram, Denzel Merritt and Ali-Khan Lochin. They have featured various musicians and vocalists, including Zendaya, Gabi Wilson, Cole Berliner, Jared Anderson and Chasity Hinson. On America's Got Talent, their performers ranged in age from 13 to 18. Both Dylan and Jaden Wiggins are sons of producer D'wayne Wiggins, a member of Tony! Toni! Toné! and Poplyfe's producer. Lochin is a cousin of the Wiggins brothers. Most of the group's members were students at Oakland School for the Arts.

Poplyfe toured with Disney's Shake It Up star Zendaya on her Swag It Out Tour.

Member Kehlani Parrish left PopLyfe soon after the end of America's Got Talent due to several managerial and contractual disputes, with the rest of the band officially disbanding in June 2012. In July of that year, Parrish briefly toured with Ingram and Merrit under the name Contraband.

== See also ==
- America's Got Talent (season 6)
- Swag It Out Tour
