= Ryōnen Gensō =

Japanese monk, teacher, and poet

- Born: 1646; Kyoto, Japan
- Died: 29 October 1711 (aged 64–65)
- Known for: Poetry, art, Zen teaching
- Spouse: Matsuda Bansui (1630–1703)
- Awards: Certificate of Enlightenment

Ryōnen Gensō (Japanese:了然元総; 1646 – 29 October 1711) was a Japanese monk, teacher, and poet who served as a teacher for poor children. She was the daughter of Katsurayama Tamehisa, who is the descendant of the famed and powerful daimyo warrior Takeda Shingen. Her mother was a part of the prestigious Konoe family.

== Biography ==
Ryonen Genso was born in Kyoto, Japan to a family with an ancient lineage spanning 1000 years. During her earlier years, she was renowned for her beauty and intellect. She was born in a large family mansion, near the front gates of Sen'yū-ji, a Buddhist temple founded centuries earlier in the Heian period. Following in her father's footsteps, she adopted his interest in calligraphy and old painting. From a young age, she worked alongside her mother in the Konoe Family Court serving a concubine by the name of Tofukumon'in. Genso became acquainted with Tofukumon'ins granddaughter and grandson. She was placed into a marriage with a man that was 16 years older than her, and was only able to leave the marriage after providing him with an heir. At the age of 16 she entered into another arranged marriage with doctor and scholar Matsuda Bansai (1630–1703), with whom she had several children.

She became a nun in 1672 and joined Hōkyō-ji, a Rinzai Temple led by Princess Zen'ni, leaving after six years to pursue greater zen study. Arriving at Kofuku-ji, Genso wished to seek further knowledge but was turned away by Haku-o Dotai, because her beauty was considered to be a distraction to the other temple's pupils. In response, she then burned her own face out of grief. Genso wrote in calligraphy about disfiguring her own face after telling Dotai about her devotion to Buddhism, but he could not see past her "womanly appearance". She returned to Dotai with the calligraphy and was granted entry into his temple where she was a disciple until he passed in 1682. She became Abbess of the temple and planned to help build another temple in his memory.

=== One of Ryonen’s surviving works. The account of her self scarring. ===
When I was young I served Yoshino-kimi, the granddaughter of Tōfukumon’in, a disciple of the imperial temple Hōkyō-ji. Recently she passed away, although I know that this is the law of nature, the transience of the world struck me deeply, and I became a nun.

I cut my hair and dyed my robes black and went on pilgrimage to Edo. There I had an audience with the monk Haku-ō of the Obaku Zen sect. I recounted to him, such things as my deep devotion to Buddhism since childhood, but Haku-ō replied that although he could see my sincere intentions, I could not escape my womanly appearance. Therefore I heated up an iron and held it against my face, and then wrote as my brush led me:

Formerly to amuse myself at court I would burn orchid incense;

Now to enter the Zen life I burn my own face.

The four seasons pass by naturally like this,

But I don’t know who I am amidst the change.

In this living world

the body I give up and burn

would be wretched

if I thought of myself as

anything but firewood.

== Legacy ==
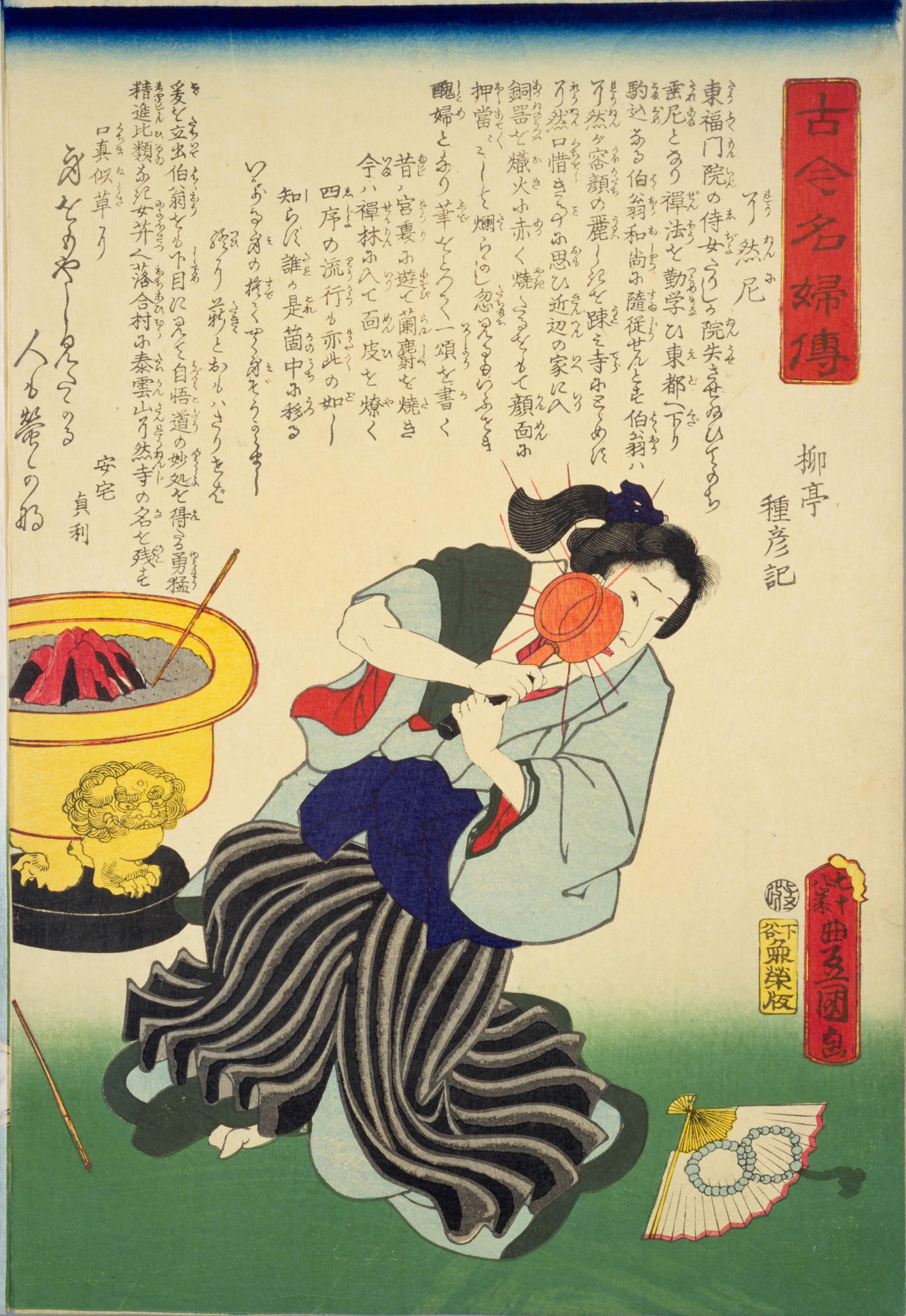
Genso depicted by painter Utagawa Kunisada

During her time as a Zen teacher, Genso was known for her kind gestures and sense of charity. Genso was known for Taiun-ji, a temple that was renovated and expanded from ruins in 1701, where many impoverished children in surrounding areas got their education.

Genso's famous story of burning her face has been illustrated in the nineteenth-century book Kinsei meika shogadan, (Famous Calligraphers and Painters of Recent Ages).

When her husband died in 1703, she constructed a memorial for him at the Taiun-ji temple along with one for her deceased master Haku-o Dotai.

Genso's life inspired the song Porcelana by Rosalía on her 2025 album Lux.

== Artistic style ==
In her calligraphy work, Genso was renowned for her incorporation of Japanese Obaku with traditional Chinese artistic style. Genso's use of the traditional Obaku chinsō style is due to her experience with the monks in the Japanese Obaku Zen sect, even incorporating this style when painting portraits of Obaku monarchs. During her earlier years in court, Genso had practiced traditional Chinese Tang Dynasty styles which she fused with Obaku in order to create her own specialized style of writing characters, in which she uniquely uses different strengths of brush strokes, depicting an image of the constant flow of the events of life.

She wrote a collection of waka poems, but it has since been lost.
