= La Perla (Rosalía and Yahritza y su Esencia song) =

Single by Rosalía and Yahritza y su Esencia

from the album Lux
- Language: Spanish
- Released: 5 December 2025
- Recorded: 2023–2025
- Studio: Larrabee Sound (Los Angeles); Noah's Studio (Los Angeles); FB House (Miami); AIR (London); L'Auditori (Barcelona); La Fabrique (Saint-Rémy-de-Provence)
- Length: 3:15
- Label: Columbia
- Songwriters: Rosalia Vila Tobella; Noah Goldstein; Dylan Wiggins; David Rodríguez; Ryan Tedder
- Producers: Rosalía; Goldstein; Wiggins

Rosalía singles chronology
"Berghain" (2025)	"La Perla" (2025)	"Sauvignon Blanc" (2026)

Yahritza y su Esencia singles chronology
"Y Qué Tal Si Te Escapas Del Cielo" (2024)	"La Perla" (2025)

Music video
- "La Perla" on YouTube

"La Perla" is a song by Spanish singer Rosalía and American regional Mexican music trio Yahritza y su Esencia. It is the seventh track on Rosalía's fourth studio album, Lux, released on 7 November 2025 through Columbia Records. The song was written by Rosalía, Noah Goldstein, Dylan Wiggins, David Rodríguez, and Ryan Tedder, and produced by Rosalía, Goldstein, and Wiggins. Upon its release, the single topped the charts in Rosalía's home country of Spain. The song was sent to Italian radio as the album's second single on 5 December 2025. On 12 November 2026, Rosalía, Goldstein, Rodríguez, Tedder, and Wiggins were awarded the Latin Grammy Award for Song of the Year for "La Perla".

== Background and composition ==
The lyrics present a deeply personal confrontation, born from a process of healing rather than a direct call-out: Rosalía stated that "there's no need to point fingers for the message to truly sink in". Musically, the track combines a minimalist but emotionally potent production with pointed lyrical metaphors: she refers to the subject as a "ladrón de paz" (peace thief), a "terrorista emocional" (emotional terrorist), and "rompecorazones nacional" (national heartbreaker). While she did not name anyone, media and fan speculation point toward Rauw Alejandro, her former fiancé. The song's title, "La Perla", alludes both to the famous neighborhood in San Juan, Puerto Rico (Rauw's place of origin) and serves as a Spanish phrase often used ironically to mock someone who stands out for negative reasons. In promotional interviews, Rosalía explained that writing "La Perla" was part of learning to let go and forgive, although she admitted: "forgiving is very hard for me — it takes me years."

On 30 October 2025, prior to the album's release, a special edition of the podcast Popcast by The New York Times aired a preview of several songs from the upcoming album, Lux. During the Popcast interview, Rosalía added that "there's always a villain" in the story, and expressed disillusionment with traditional masculinity, stating: "the faith in masculinity is lost". Further discussion around "La Perla" arose after Rosalía shared an Instagram photo showing a whiteboard used in the creative planning of Lux, where the name "Bey" appeared next to the song's title. The image sparked speculation about Beyoncé's potential involvement in the track, either as an early intended collaborator, a possible feature on an upcoming version, or simply an artistic reference in the creation process to Beyoncé's lyrically ravaging 2016 studio album Lemonade.

== Live performances ==
Rosalía performed "La Perla" solo live on The Tonight Show Starring Jimmy Fallon on 16 November 2025 as promotion for Lux. The staging was inspired by Hans Christian Andersen's fairy tale "The Princess and the Pea".

== Music video ==
Rosalía announced the music video for "La Perla" on social media hours before its release on 16 December 2025. The video was directed by Stillz (Matías Vásquez), an American-Colombian director who previously collaborated with the singer on visuals for Motomami and the video for "La Noche de Anoche".

The video features scenes of fencing and ice skating, alongside luxury imagery such as high-end cars, Doberman dogs and smoking, elements that have appeared in Rosalía's previous visual work. Reception to the video was mixed, with some viewers praising its aesthetics while others expressed disappointment over its perceived lack of narrative depth.

== Accolades ==
Select list of awards and nominations for La Perla
Year	Organization	Award	Result	Ref.
2026	Billboard Latin Music Awards	Global 200 Latin Artist of the Year	Nominated	
2026	Latin Grammy Awards	Song of the Year	Won	
2026	Latin Grammy Awards	Best Pop Song	Won	
2026	Latin Grammy Awards	Record of the Year	Nominated	
2026	Los 40 Music Awards	Best Spanish Song	Nominated	
2026	MTV Video Music Awards	Best Latin	Nominated	
2026	Premios de la Academia de Música	Song of the Year	Won	
2026	Premios de la Academia de Música	Songwriter of the Year	Won	
2026	Premios de la Academia de Música	Best Pop Song	Won	
2026	Premios Odeón	Best Pop Song	Won	
2027	Grammy Awards	Best Latin Song	Pending	

== Credits and personnel ==
Credits adapted from the Lux credits page on Rosalía's official website.

Performers

- Rosalía – primary artist, vocals
- Yahritza y su Esencia – primary artist
- London Symphony Orchestra – orchestra
- Daníel Bjarnason – conductor

Songwriting and production

- Rosalía Vila Tobella – composer, lyricist, producer, vocal producer
- Noah Goldstein – composer, producer
- Dylan Wiggins – composer, producer
- David Rodríguez – composer, vocal producer, additional production
- Ryan Tedder – composer
- Vanessa Amara – arranger

Technical

- Manny Marroquin – mixing engineer
- Ramiro Fernandez-Seoane – assistant mixing engineer
- Francesco Di Giovanni – assistant mixing engineer
- Brian Lee – mastering engineer
- Bob Jackson – mastering engineer

Additional personnel

- Kyle Gordon – score transcription
- Pili Vila – background vocals
- Carlota Guerrero – background vocals
- Luisina Sanchez – background vocals
- Albert Cusell – background vocals

== Charts ==
=== Weekly charts ===
Weekly chart performance
Chart (2025–2026)	Peak position
Argentina Hot 100 (Billboard)	1
Austria (Ö3 Austria Top 40)	59
Belgium (Ultratop 50 Flanders)	50
Belgium (Ultratop 50 Wallonia)	10
Bolivia (Billboard)	10
Bolivia Airplay (Monitor Latino)	9
Canada Hot 100 (Billboard)	88
Central America Airplay (Monitor Latino)	5
Central America + Caribbean (FONOTICA)	19
Chile (Billboard)	7
Chile Airplay (Monitor Latino)	3
Colombia Hot 100 (Billboard)	24
Colombia Airplay (National-Report)	9
Costa Rica Airplay (FONOTICA)	10
Costa Rica Airplay (Monitor Latino)	5
Ecuador (Billboard)	13
Ecuador Airplay (Monitor Latino)	11
El Salvador Airplay (ASAP EGC)	1
France (SNEP)	75
France Airplay (SNEP)	27
Global 200 (Billboard)	12
Greece International (IFPI)	8
Guatemala Airplay (Monitor Latino)	3
Ireland (IRMA)	43
Israel International Airplay (Media Forest)	9
Israel TV Airplay (Media Forest)	5
Italy (FIMI)	32
Lithuania Airplay (TopHit)	49
Latin America Latino Airplay (Monitor Latino)	9
Luxembourg (Billboard)	9
Mexico (Billboard)	15
Netherlands (Single Top 100)	53
Netherlands (Global Top 40)	12
New Zealand Hot Singles (RMNZ)	9
Panama Airplay (Monitor Latino)	4
Panama International (PRODUCE)	20
Paraguay Airplay (Monitor Latino)	3
Peru (Billboard)	21
Peru Airplay (Monitor Latino)	6
Portugal (AFP)	7
Puerto Rico Airplay (Monitor Latino)	7
Spain (Promusicae)	1
Sweden (Sverigetopplistan)	82
Switzerland (Schweizer Hitparade)	7
Uruguay Airplay (Monitor Latino)	3
US Billboard Hot 100	82
US Hot Latin Songs (Billboard)	3

=== Monthly charts ===
Monthly chart performance
Chart (2025–2026)	Peak position
Lithuania Airplay (TopHit)	77
Panama Streaming (PRODUCE)	58
Paraguay Airplay (SGP)	10
Uruguay Streaming (CUD)	3

== Certifications ==
Certifications
Region	Certification	Certified units/sales
Belgium (BRMA)	Gold	20,000^{‡}
France (SNEP)	Gold	100,000^{‡}
Mexico (AMPROFON)	2× Platinum+Gold	350,000^{‡}
Portugal (AFP)	Platinum	25,000^{‡}
Spain (Promusicae)	4× Platinum	400,000^{‡}
Streaming
Central America (CFC)	Gold	3,500,000^{†}
^{‡} Sales+streaming figures based on certification alone.
