= Armando Machado =

Portuguese fadista, guitarist and "viola" player

Armando Artur da Silva Machado (Lisbon, 1899-1974) was a Portuguese fadista, guitarist and "viola" player, meaning the viola caipira guitar. He performed with his wife Maria de Lourdes Machado, a nurse who became an accomplished Fado singer. In 1937 he opened the Adega Machado in Lisbon's Bairro Alto, which was the second fado bar in the bairro, but the first to give daily performances.

In 1996 Belgian conductor Paul Van Nevel selected Machado's So pode ser amor for inclusion on his Tears of Lisbon tribute to Fado.

== Notable works ==
- Fado Cigano - bolero, Cigano da Fronteira.
- Fado Cunha e Silva (Fado Aracélia)
- Fado Licas - dedicated to the couple's son Licas, text by João Linhares Barbosa, text commissioned by Maria de Lourdes Machado on her son's call up to the navy, with the title "Fé e Coragem Meu Filho"
- Fado Lourdes - dedicated to his wife
- Fado Marana "Lisboa, meu amor, Lisboa"
- Fado Maria Rita
- Fado Súplica "Saudades da Madrugada", text Fernando Peres.
