= Berghain (song) =

- Conrad Taylor remix cover

Single by Rosalía, Björk and Yves Tumor

from the album Lux
- Language: German; Spanish; English
- Released: 27 October 2025
- Genre: Art Pop; Classical Crossover
- Length: 2:58
- Label: Columbia
- Songwriters: Rosalia Vila Tobella; Björk Guðmundsdóttir; Noah Goldstein; Dylan Wiggins; Jake Miller
- Producers: Rosalía; Goldstein; Sir Dylan; Jake Miller

Rosalía singles chronology
"Omega" (2024)	"Berghain" (2025)	"La Perla" (2025)

Björk singles chronology
"Oral" (2023)	"Berghain" (2025)

Yves Tumor singles chronology
"We Don't Count" (2025)	"Berghain" (2025)

Music video
- "Berghain" on YouTube

"Berghain" is a song by Spanish singer Rosalía, Icelandic artist Björk, and American experimental musician Yves Tumor. It was released on 27 October 2025 by Columbia Records as the lead single from Rosalía's fourth studio album, Lux. It was written by the trio themselves, alongside the song's producers, Noah Goldstein, Sir Dylan, and Jake Miller, who produced the track alongside Rosalía herself.

The Guardian described the song as a gothic, baroque assault powered by Antonio Vivaldi–style strings and operatic singing in German and Spanish. The song features the London Symphony Orchestra and is characterized by Rosalía's introspective vocals and a restrained, atmospheric melody.

Upon its release, the single topped the charts in Rosalía's home country of Spain, and peaked at number 1 on the Billboard World Digital Song Sales chart in the United States. The single also charted in Austria, Germany, Ireland, Netherlands, and Switzerland, and charted at number 22 on the Global 200. The song's music video was released on the same day as the song, and was directed by Nicolás Méndez.

== Background and composition ==
On 25 October 2025, Rosalía announced that the lead single from her upcoming fourth studio album, Lux, would be released on 27 October. The release marks Rosalía's first single release in over a year, following promotional single "Omega" (2024). The song also marked the second collaboration between Rosalía and Björk, after 2023 charity single "Oral".

Described as a "deeply personal" return for the singer, "Berghain" departs from the experimental sound of Motomami (2022) in favor of a more ethereal, spiritual, and orchestral sound. Inspired by Hildegard of Bingen and Vimala, the song opens with a series of verses in German: "Seine Angst ist meine Angst / Seine Wut ist meine Wut / Seine Liebe ist meine Liebe / Sein Blut ist mein Blut" ("His fear is my fear / His anger is my anger / His love is my love / His blood is my blood"); they introduce Rosalía's solo verses. Later, she is vocally joined by Björk and Yves Tumor.

== Critical reception ==
Walden Green of Pitchfork wrote that "never before has Rosalía flexed her classical training this hard" describing the performance as "coloratura", comparing it to "Winter" by Antonio Vivaldi and The Rite of Spring by Igor Stravinsky and praised that Björk's "gale force presence threatens to knock the song on its side like a two-dimensional facade". Green also reflected on the song title, which is a namesake of a Berlin nightclub accused of cancelling a music performance by a pro-Palestine artist, relating this reference to the singer's political view, although Green thought the song "never quite earns its provocation". Rosalía later clarified that the title was inspired by the literal meaning, "mountain grove" rather than a reference to the Berlin nightclub.

Publication	List	Rank	Ref.
The Guardian	The 20 Best Songs of 2025	1	
Crack Magazine	The 25 Best Tracks of 2025	1	
The Forty-Five	The 45 Best Tracks of 2025	1	
Still Listening Magazine	The Top 50 Songs Of 2025	2	
DIY	2025 Tracks of the Year	9	

== Commercial performance ==
In Spain, "Berghain" debuted at number one on the Spanish Singles Chart with only four days of tracking, becoming Rosalía's 12th chart-topping single. With this achievement, she extended her record as the Spanish female artist with the most number-one songs, and tied Quevedo as the overall Spanish artist with the most number ones. For Björk, "Berghain" marked her second number-one single in Spain after "Hidden Place" in 2001.

Internationally, the single reached number 21 on the Billboard Hot Rock & Alternative Songs chart in the United States, and peaked at number 2 on the World Digital Song Sales chart. It also charted at number 5 on Austria's Ö3 Austria Top 40, number 12 on the German Singles Chart, number 85 on the Irish Singles Chart, number 15 on the Dutch Single Top 100, number 4 on the New Zealand Hot Singles chart, and number 4 on the Schweizer Hitparade in Switzerland. Globally, "Berghain" peaked at numbers 22 and 14 on Billboard Global 200 and Billboard Global Excl. US, respectively, becoming Björk's and Yves Tumor's first entry on both charts.

== Music video ==
The accompanying music video was released on 27 October 2025 and directed by Nicolás Méndez of the Barcelona-based production company Canada, with whom the singer had previously collaborated on the videos for 2018 singles "Malamente" and "Pienso en tu mirá". The music video was shot in Warsaw.

The video follows Rosalía surrounded by an orchestra in different locations including an apartment, a hospital, a bus and a pawn shop. She then returns to her apartment to find the door open, and when she investigates finds that it has been painted like a forest and many animals are inside, including a bird that sings Björk's vocals. The video concludes with Rosalía in bed, cut between distressing dark scenes of the animals morphing and a drum, she then appears to turn into a dove.

== Live performances ==
Rosalía and Björk performed "Berghain" live alongside the Heritage Orchestra at the Brit Awards 2026.

== Credits ==
Credits adapted from the Lux credits page on Rosalía's official website.

- Rosalía – performance, composition, lyrics, production, vocal production, executive production
- Björk – performance, composition
- Lisa Salker – performance
- Yves Tumor – performance
- London Symphony Orchestra – orchestra
- Dylan Wiggins – composition, production
- Jake Miller – composition, arrangement, production, recording, mixing
- Noah Goldstein – composition, arrangement, production
- Elliott Kozel – arrangement
- David Rodríguez – additional production, vocal production, recording
- Isaac Diskin – assistant recording
- Francesco Di Giovanni – assistant mixing
- Ramiro Fernandez-Seoane – assistant mixing
- Manny Marroquin – mixing
- Brian Lee – mastering

== Accolades ==
Select list of awards and nominations for Berghain
Year	Organization	Award	Result	Ref.
2026	American Music Awards	Favorite Music Video	Nominated	
2026	Cannes Lions International Festival of Creativity	Excellence in Music Video	Grand Prix	
2026	Los 40 Music Awards	Best Spanish Music Video	Won	
2026	Premios de la Academia de Música	Best Music Video	Won	
2026	UK Music Video Awards	Best Pop Video – International	Won	
2026	UK Music Video Awards	Best Styling in a Video	Won	
2027	Grammy Awards	Record of the Year	Pending	
2027	Grammy Awards	Song of the Year	Pending	
2027	Grammy Awards	Best Music Video	Pending	

== Charts ==
Chart performance
Chart (2025–2026)	Peak position
Argentina Hot 100 (Billboard)	25
Austria (Ö3 Austria Top 40)	5
Belgium (Ultratop 50 Flanders)	40
Belgium (Ultratop 50 Wallonia)	38
Canada Hot 100 (Billboard)	73
France (SNEP)	32
Germany (GfK)	12
Global 200 (Billboard)	15
Greece International (IFPI)	2
Iceland (Tónlistinn)	27
Ireland (IRMA)	32
Italy (FIMI)	20
Lithuania (AGATA)	42
Lithuania Airplay (TopHit)	58
Luxembourg (Billboard)	5
Netherlands (Single Top 100)	33
Netherlands (Tipparade)	14
Netherlands (Global Top 40)	14
New Zealand Hot Singles (RMNZ)	15
Norway (IFPI Norge)	68
Poland (Polish Streaming Top 100)	52
Portugal (AFP)	4
Spain (Promusicae)	1
Sweden (Sverigetopplistan)	44
Switzerland (Schweizer Hitparade)	3
UK Singles (Official Charts)	36
US Bubbling Under Hot 100 (Billboard)	3
US Hot Rock & Alternative Songs (Billboard)	16
US World Digital Song Sales (Billboard)	1

== Certifications ==
Certifications for "Berghain"
Region	Certification	Certified units/sales
Belgium (BRMA)	Gold	20,000^{‡}
France (SNEP)	Gold	100,000^{‡}
Mexico (AMPROFON)	Gold	70,000^{‡}
Portugal (AFP)	Gold	12,000^{‡}
Spain (Promusicae)	Platinum	100,000^{‡}
Switzerland (IFPI Switzerland)	Gold	15,000^{‡}
^{‡} Sales+streaming figures based on certification alone.

== Release history ==
Release dates and formats
Region	Date	Format	Label	Version	Ref.
Various	27 October 2025	Digital download; streaming	Original	Columbia	
Italy	27 October 2025	Radio airplay	Original	Sony Italy	
Various	6 March 2026	Digital download; streaming	Conrad Taylor remix	Columbia	
