= Dylan Wiggins =

American singer, songwriter, producer, multi-instrumentalist

Dylan Patrice Wiggins
- Born: October 5, 1995 (age 31); Oakland, California, U.S.
- Other names: Sir Dylan, Dylan Patrice
- Education: Oakland School for the Arts
- Relatives: D'Wayne Wiggins (father); Raphael Saadiq (uncle)
- Musical career
- Genres: R&B; soul; hip hop; pop
- Occupations: Singer; songwriter; producer; multi-instrumentalist
- Formerly of: PopLyfe

Dylan Patrice Wiggins (born October 5, 1995), also known as Sir Dylan, is an American singer, songwriter, producer, and multi-instrumentalist, best known for a Season 6 grand finals appearance on America's Got Talent (with hometown pop group PopLyfe), and for co-writing hit singles "Die for You", "Over Now", "Daisies", "I Hate U", and "1-800-273-8255", among others. His productions have appeared on albums including A Seat at the Table, War & Leisure, Motomami, Starboy, SOS, Lux, and Swag.

== Early life ==
Wiggins was born in Oakland, California, the second of three children to D'Wayne Wiggins (singer, songwriter, and producer of Tony! Toni! Toné! fame) and Michelle Lochin-Wiggins. He attended Oakland School for the Arts, quickly immersing himself in the local music scene via "jam sessions" with classmates.

== Music career ==
=== 2010-2012: PopLyfe ===
By 2010, The unofficial "jam sessions" with classmates and other local instrumentalists had evolved into a formal music group: pop band PopLyfe was created, containing Oakland Arts classmates and future stars Kehlani Parrish, Zendaya, and the Wiggins brothers, bay area native Gabi Wilson, and several other members, performing songs produced by their father D'Wayne. PopLyfe appeared on Season 6 of America's Got Talent, achieving a finals placement and performing with Stevie Wonder. The group finished fourth. In 2012, Parrish would leave the group due to contractual disputes, and the group disbanded soon after.

=== 2013-2017: SMSHNG HRTS and initial musical success ===
Wiggins formed five-piece r&b/soul band SMSHNG HRTS with his brother Jaden and childhood friend Martin Rodrigues. The group played SXSW Festival, but were later forced to disband due to naming copyright issues with band Smashing Pumpkins.

=== 2018-Present: Hello Yello and further musical success ===
In 2018, Wiggins formed pop-punk-hip-hop outfit Hello Yello, reuniting with Jaden and Rodrigues. They released their debut EP Love Wins in March 2018 to acclaim, before participating in a nationwide tour, opening for Clairo & Beabadoobee. One of their compositions was later used to create song "Dont Want It" on Lil Nas X's 2021 debut album Montero. In 2022, Wiggins would co-write and co-produce a majority of Rosalía's eclectic, universally acclaimed project Motomami.

== Discography ==
=== Executive-produced/co-written projects ===
Projects with ~ 50% Sir Dylan production/songwriting credits (or more than 7 Sir Dylan produced/written tracks)
Album	Artist	Year	Label
Motomami	Rosalía	2022	Columbia Records
Never Enough	Daniel Caesar	2023	Republic Records
RR	Rosalía & Rauw Alejandro	2023	Columbia | Sony Latin
Sincerely	Kali Uchis	2025	Capitol Records
Swag	Justin Bieber	2025	ILH Production Co. LLC | Def Jam Recordings
Swag II	Justin Bieber	2025	ILH Production Co. LLC | Def Jam Recordings
Son of Spergy	Daniel Caesar	2025	Republic Records
Lux	Rosalía	2025	Columbia Records

=== Selected songwriting and production credits ===
Credits are courtesy of Discogs, Tidal, Apple Music, and AllMusic.

Title	Year	Artist	Album
"The Bigger You Love (The Harder You Fall)"	2014	Paloma Faith	A Perfect Contradiction
"Love Only Leaves You Lonely"	2014	Paloma Faith	A Perfect Contradiction
"Innermission" (featuring Lucy Rose)	2015	Logic	The Incredible True Story
"Lord Willin'"	2015	Logic	The Incredible True Story
"Paradise" (featuring Jesse Boykins III)	2015	Logic	The Incredible True Story
"Secrets"	2016	The Weeknd	Starboy
"Reminder" (solo or remix with Young Thug & ASAP Rocky)	2016	The Weeknd	Starboy
"Die for You" (solo or remix with Ariana Grande)	2016	The Weeknd	Starboy
"Stay Up" (featuring Stacy Barthe)	2016	Fantasia	The Definition Of...
"Weary"	2016	Solange Knowles	A Seat at the Table
"Mad" (featuring Lil Wayne)	2016	Solange Knowles	A Seat at the Table
"Where Do We Go"	2016	Solange Knowles	A Seat at the Table
"1-800-273-8255" (featuring Alessia Cara & Khalid)	2017	Logic	Everybody
"Wolf" (featuring Quiñ)	2017	Miguel	War & Leisure
"Hey Iggy"	2018	Iggy Azalea	Survive the Summer
"Kings Fall"	2019	Raphael Saadiq	Jimmy Lee
"Red Light"	2019	Safe	Stay
"R U Scared, Pt. 2"	2019	Safe	Stay
"So Bad"	2020	JoJo	Good to Know
"Lonely Hearts" (solo or remix with Demi Lovato)	2020	JoJo	Good to Know
"In Your Room"	2020	JoJo	Good to Know
"Zillionaire"	2020	The Aces	Under My Influence
"I'm Gone"	2020	Oliver Tree	Ugly Is Beautiful
"I Hate U"	2021	SZA	SOS
"Way Bigger"	2021	Don Toliver	Life of a Don
"What You Need"	2021	Don Toliver	Life of a Don
"Double Standards"	2021	Don Toliver	Life of a Don
"Drugs n Hella Melodies" (featuring Kali Uchis)	2021	Don Toliver	Life of a Don
"Somebody Else"	2021	Alessia Cara	In the Meantime
"What About Heaven"	2021	Mustafa	When Smoke Rises
"Don't Want It"	2021	Lil Nas X	Montero
"One Day"	2021	Imagine Dragons	Mercury – Act 1
"LLF"	2021	Roddy Ricch	Live Life Fast
"I Can Only Whisper" (featuring BadBadNotGood)	2021	Charlotte Day Wilson	Alpha
"Wish It Was Easy"	2021	Charlotte Day Wilson	Alpha
"Nameless"	2022	Vince Staples	Ramona Park Broke My Heart
"Game Over" (with Queen Naija)	2022	Babyface	Girls Night Out
"Oxymoron"	2022	Oliver Tree	Cowboy Tears Drown the World in a Swimming Pool of Sorrow
"I Wish You Roses"	2023	Kali Uchis	Red Moon in Venus
"Moral Conscience"	2023	Kali Uchis	Red Moon in Venus
"Way Back" (with PinkPantheress & Trippie Redd)	2023	Skrillex	Don't Get Too Close
"Ceremony" (with Yung Lean & Bladee)	2023	Skrillex	Don't Get Too Close
"Bright Red"	2023	Ryan Beatty	Calico
"Since I Have a Lover"	2023	6lack	Since I Have a Lover
"Playin House"	2023	6lack	Since I Have a Lover
"Fatal Attraction"	2023	6lack	Since I Have a Lover
"Chasing Feeling"	2023	6lack	Since I Have a Lover
"Heaven Surrounds Us Like a Hood"	2023	Yves Tumor	Praise a Lord Who Chews but Which Does Not Consume; (Or Simply, Hot Between Worlds)
"Ebony Eye"	2023	Yves Tumor	Praise a Lord Who Chews but Which Does Not Consume; (Or Simply, Hot Between Worlds)
"The Line" (with D4vd)	2023	The Kid Laroi	The First Time
"Igual que un Ángel" (with Peso Pluma)	2024	Kali Uchis	Orquídeas
"Number One Girl"	2024	Rosé	Rosie
"Drinks or Coffee"	2024	Rosé	Rosie
"Real Love"	2024	Childish Gambino	Bando Stone & the New World
"Dadvocate"	2024	Childish Gambino	Bando Stone & the New World
"Only Living Girl in LA"	2024	Halsey	The Great Impersonator
"Hometown"	2024	Halsey	The Great Impersonator
"Hurt Feelings"	2024	Halsey	The Great Impersonator
"Lucky"	2024	Halsey	The Great Impersonator
"When He's Not There" (featuring Lucky Daye)	2024	Kehlani	While We Wait 2
"What Happened, Mohamed?"	2024	Mustafa	Dunya
"Imaan"	2024	Mustafa	Dunya
"I'll Go Anywhere"	2024	Mustafa	Dunya
"Leaving Toronto" (with Daniel Caesar)	2024	Mustafa	Dunya
"Nouri"	2024	Mustafa	Dunya
"Inside" (featuring Travis Scott)	2024	Don Toliver	Hardstone Psycho
"Up and Down"	2024	Teezo Touchdown	How Do You Sleep at Night? With You.
"Done with You"	2024	Omar Apollo	God Said No
"Another Life"	2024	SZA	Lana
"Bliss"	2025	Tyla	We Wanna Party
"Andy"	2025	Skrillex	Fuck U Skrillex You Think Ur Andy Warhol but Ur Not!!
"Stunna"	2025	Rico Nasty	Lethal-er

== Awards and nominations ==
Year	Ceremony	Award	Result	Ref
2022	23rd Annual Latin Grammy Awards	Album of The Year (Motomami)	Won	
2022	23rd Annual Latin Grammy Awards	Record of the Year ("La Fama")	Nominated	
2022	23rd Annual Latin Grammy Awards	Song of the Year ("Hentai")	Nominated	
2022	23rd Annual Latin Grammy Awards	Best Alternative Song ("Hentai")	Nominated	
2023	24th Annual Latin Grammy Awards	Record of the Year ("Despechá")	Nominated	
2023	Inaugural Rolling Stone en Español Awards	Song of the Year ("Despechá")	Nominated	
2023	BMI 2023 R&B/Hip-Hop Awards	Most Performed Songs of the Year ("Die for You")	Won	
2023	BMI 2023 R&B/Hip-Hop Awards	Most Performed Songs of the Year ("I Hate U")	Won	
2024	BMI 2024 London Awards	Most Performed Songs of the Year ("Beso")	Won	
2024	BMI Pop Awards	Most Performed Songs of the Year ("Die for You")	Won	
2024	25th Annual Latin Grammy Awards	Record of The Year ("Igual que un Ángel")	Nominated	
2024	25th Annual Latin Grammy Awards	Best Pop Song ("Igual que un Ángel")	Nominated	
2025	Asian Pop Music Awards	Best Composer ("Number One Girl")	Nominated	
2026	68th Annual Grammy Awards	Album of the Year (Swag)	Nominated	
2026	27th Annual Latin Grammy Awards	Record of The Year ("La Perla")	Nominated	
2026	27th Annual Latin Grammy Awards	Album of the Year (Lux (Complete Works))	Won	
2026	27th Annual Latin Grammy Awards	Song of The Year ("La Perla")	Won	
2026	27th Annual Latin Grammy Awards	Best Pop Song ("La Perla")	Won	
2027	69th Annual Grammy Awards	Album of the Year (Lux (Complete Works))	Nominated	
2027	69th Annual Grammy Awards	Record of the Year ("Berghain")	Nominated	
2027	69th Annual Grammy Awards	Song of the Year ("Berghain")	Nominated	
2027	69th Annual Grammy Awards	Best Latin Song ("La Perla")	Nominated	
