= List of awards and nominations received by Rauw Alejandro =

Rauw Alejandro awards and nominations
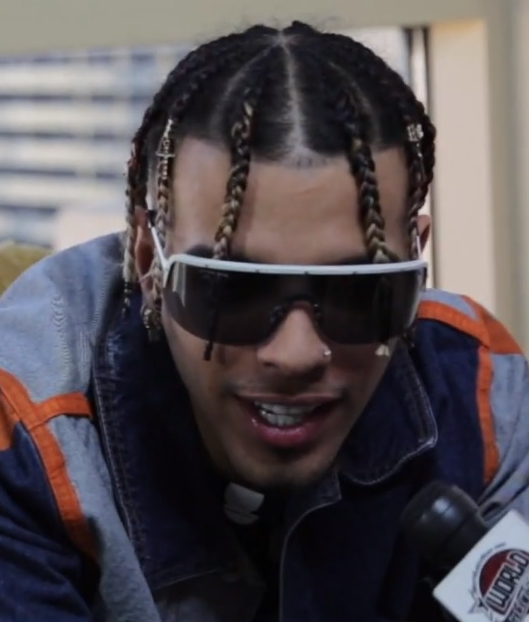
- Alejandro in 2021
Awards and nominations
Award	Wins	Nominations
Billboard Music Awards	0	4
Billboard Latin Music Awards	2	12
Grammy Awards	0	3
Heat Latin Music Awards	0	4
Latin American Music Awards	1	16
Latin Grammy Awards	2	12
Premios Juventud	0	24
Premios Lo Nuestro	2	11

Totals (Note: Certain award groups do not simply award one winner. They acknowledge several different recipients, have runners-up, and have third place. Since this is a specific recognition and is different from losing an award, runner-up mentions are considered wins in this award tally. For simplification and to avoid errors, each award in this list has been presumed to have had a prior nomination.)
- Wins: 35
- Nominations: 215

Rauw Alejandro is a Puerto Rican singer and songwriter. He has received several awards and nominations including two Latin Grammy Awards, two Billboard Latin Music Awards and two Premios Lo Nuestro, as well as three Grammy Awards nominations.

After releasing a series of singles he was nominated for the Latin Grammy Award for Best New Artist in 2020, his first Latin Grammy nomination. Later in the year he released his debut album Afrodisíaco. During 2021 he began receiving various awards and nominations such as the iHeartRadio Music Award for Best New Latin Artist and the Latin American Music Award for New Artist of the Year. In 2022, his debut album was nominated for Best Música Urbana Album at the 64th Annual Grammy Awards, being his first Grammy Award nomination.

In 2021, he released "Todo de Ti" to commercial success. The song was nominated for both Song of the Year and Record of the Year at the 22nd Annual Latin Grammy Awards. Additionally, it won two Billboard Latin Music Awards and was nominated for an American Music Award. The same year, Alejandro received his first Latin Grammy Award for Best Urban Fusion/Performance for the remix of "Tattoo" featuring Colombian singer Camilo. Also in 2021, he released his second studio album Vice Versa.

Through 2022, Alejandro collaborated with several artists, achieving a nomination for Album of the Year at the 65th Annual Grammy Awards for Bad Bunny's Un Verano Sin Ti and winning Album of the Year at the 23rd Annual Latin Grammy Awards for Rosalía's Motomami, both as a songwriter. He also collaborated with Shakira in "Te Felicito", which won two Premios Lo Nuestro and a Los 40 Music Award.

== Awards and nominations ==
Name of the award ceremony, year presented, recipient of the award, category and result
Award	Year	Recipient(s) and nominee(s)	Category	Result	Ref.
American Music Awards	2021	Himself	Favorite Male Artist – Latin	Nominated	
American Music Awards	2021	Afrodisíaco	Favorite Album – Latin	Nominated	
American Music Awards	2022	Himself	Favorite Male Artist – Artist	Nominated	
American Music Awards	2022	"Todo de Ti"	Favorite Song – Latin	Nominated	
American Music Awards	2022	Vice Versa	Favorite Album – Latin	Nominated	
American Music Awards	2025	Himself	Favorite Male Artist – Artist	Nominated	
American Music Awards	2025	Cosa Nuestra	Favorite Album – Latin	Nominated	
American Music Awards	2026	Himself	Favorite Male Artist – Artist	Nominated	
ASCAP Latin Music Awards	2021	"Fantasías" (with Farruko)	Winning Songs	Won	
ASCAP Latin Music Awards	2021	"Tattoo" (remix) (with Camilo)	Winning Songs	Won	
ASCAP Latin Music Awards	2022	"Baila Conmigo" (with Selena Gomez)	Winning Songs	Won	
ASCAP Latin Music Awards	2022	"La Nota" (with Manuel Turizo & Myke Towers)	Winning Songs	Won	
ASCAP Latin Music Awards	2022	"Reloj" (with Anuel AA)	Winning Songs	Won	
ASCAP Latin Music Awards	2022	"Todo de Ti"	Winning Songs	Won	
ASCAP Latin Music Awards	2023	"Cúrame"	Winning Songs	Won	
ASCAP Latin Music Awards	2023	"Desesperados" (with Chencho Corleone)	Winning Songs	Won	
ASCAP Latin Music Awards	2023	"Nostálgico" (with Rvssian & Chris Brown)	Winning Songs	Won	
ASCAP Latin Music Awards	2023	"Party" (with Rauw Alejandro)	Winning Songs	Won	
ASCAP Latin Music Awards	2023	"Te Felicito" (with Shakira)	Winning Songs	Won	
ASCAP Latin Music Awards	2024	"Lokera" (with Lyanno & Brray)	Winning Songs	Won	
ASCAP Latin Music Awards	2024	"Punto 40" (with Baby Rasta)	Winning Songs	Won	
ASCAP Latin Music Awards	2025	"Diluvio"	Winning Songs	Won	
ASCAP Latin Music Awards	2025	"La Nena" (with Lyanno)	Winning Songs	Won	
Berlin Commercial Awards	2021	"Baila Conmigo" (with Selena Gomez)	Best Music Video	Nominated	
Berlin Commercial Awards	2021	"Baila Conmigo" (with Selena Gomez)	Craft: Idea	Nominated	
Berlin Commercial Awards	2021	"Baila Conmigo" (with Selena Gomez)	Craft: Direction	Nominated	
Berlin Commercial Awards	2021	"Baila Conmigo" (with Selena Gomez)	Craft: Cinematography	Nominated	
Berlin Music Video Awards	2023	"De Carolina"	Best Song	Nominated	
Billboard Music Awards	2022	"Todo de Ti"	Top Latin Song	Nominated	
Billboard Music Awards	2022	Vice Versa	Top Latin Male Album	Nominated	
Billboard Music Awards	2022	Himself	Top Latin Artist	Nominated	
Billboard Music Awards	2022	Himself	Top Latin Male Artist	Nominated	
Billboard Music Awards	2023	Himself	Top Latin Male Artist	Nominated	
Billboard Latin Music Awards	2021	Himself	Artist of the Year, New	Nominated	
Billboard Latin Music Awards	2021	"TBT" (with Sebastián Yatra & Manuel Turizo)	Latin Pop Song of the Year	Nominated	
Billboard Latin Music Awards	2022	Himself	Artist of the Year	Nominated	
Billboard Latin Music Awards	2022	Himself	Hot Latin Songs Artist of the Year, Male	Nominated	
Billboard Latin Music Awards	2022	Himself	Top Latin Albums Artist of the Year, Male	Nominated	
Billboard Latin Music Awards	2022	Himself	Latin Rhythm Artist of the Year, Solo	Nominated	
Billboard Latin Music Awards	2022	"Party" (with Bad Bunny)	Hot Latin Song of the Year, Vocal Event	Nominated	
Billboard Latin Music Awards	2022	"Todo de Ti"	Airplay Song of the Year	Won	
Billboard Latin Music Awards	2022	"Todo de Ti"	Latin Pop Song of the Year	Won	
Billboard Latin Music Awards	2022	"Te Felicito" (with Shakira)	Latin Pop Song of the Year	Nominated	
Billboard Latin Music Awards	2022	Vice Versa	Top Latin Album of the Year	Nominated	
Billboard Latin Music Awards	2022	Vice Versa	Latin Rhythm Album of the Year	Nominated	
Billboard Latin Music Awards	2023	Himself	Top Latin Albums Artist of the Year, Male	Nominated	
Billboard Latin Music Awards	2023	Himself	Latin Rhythm Artist of the Year, Solo	Nominated	
Billboard Latin Music Awards	2023	Himself	Tour of the Year	Nominated	
Billboard Latin Music Awards	2023	"Beso" (with Rosalía)	Latin Pop Song of the Year	Nominated	
Billboard Latin Music Awards	2023	"Party" (with Bad Bunny)	Latin Rhythm Song of the Year	Nominated	
Billboard Latin Music Awards	2023	Saturno	Top Latin Album of the Year	Nominated	
Billboard Latin Music Awards	2023	Saturno	Latin Rhythm Album of the Year	Nominated	
Billboard Latin Music Awards	2024	Himself	Top Latin Albums Artist of the Year, Male	Nominated	
Billboard Latin Music Awards	2024	Himself	Latin Rhythm Artist of the Year, Solo	Nominated	
Billboard Latin Music Awards	2024	Playa Saturno	Latin Rhythm Album of the Year	Nominated	
Billboard Latin Music Awards	2025	Himself	Artist of the Year	Nominated	
Billboard Latin Music Awards	2025	Himself	Tour of the Year	Nominated	
Billboard Latin Music Awards	2025	Himself	Hot Latin Songs Artist of the Year, Male	Nominated	
Billboard Latin Music Awards	2025	Himself	Top Latin Albums Artist of the Year, Male	Nominated	
Billboard Latin Music Awards	2025	Himself	Latin Rhythm Artist of the Year, Solo	Nominated	
Billboard Latin Music Awards	2025	Cosa Nuestra	Top Latin Album of the Year	Nominated	
Billboard Latin Music Awards	2025	Cosa Nuestra	Top Latin Rhythm Album of the Year	Nominated	
Billboard Latin Music Awards	2025	"Khé?" (with Romeo Santos)	Hot Latin Song of the Year, Vocal Event	Nominated	
Billboard Latin Music Awards	2025	"Khé?" (with Romeo Santos)	Latin Airplay Song of the Year	Nominated	
Billboard Latin Music Awards	2025	"Khé?" (with Romeo Santos)	Latin Rhythm Song of the Year	Nominated	
Billboard Latin Music Awards	2025	"Qué Pasaría..." (with Bad Bunny)	Hot Latin Song of the Year, Vocal Event	Nominated	
Billboard Latin Music Awards	2025	"Qué Pasaría..." (with Bad Bunny)	Latin Rhythm Song of the Year	Nominated	
Billboard Latin Music Awards	2025	"Carita Linda"	Latin Pop Song of the Year	Nominated	
Billboard Latin Music Awards	2025	"Tú Con Él"	Tropical Song of the Year	Nominated	
E40 Music Awards	2021	Himself	Best Artist of the Year	Nominated	
E40 Music Awards	2021	"Todo de Ti"	Song of the Year	Nominated	
E40 Music Awards	2021	"Tiroteo" (remix) (with Marc Seguí & Pol Granch	Music Video of the Year	Nominated	
E40 Music Awards	2021	"Baila Conmigo" (with Selena Gomez)	Music Video of the Year	Won	
FM Like Los+Likeados	2021	Himself	Urban Artist of the Year	Won	
FM Like Los+Likeados	2021	"Todo de Ti"	Song of the Year	Nominated	
FM Like Los+Likeados	2021	"Sabe" (with Nicki Nicole)	Collaboration of the Year	Nominated	
Grammy Awards	2022	Afrodisíaco	Best Música Urbana Album	Nominated	
Grammy Awards	2023	Trap Cake, Vol. 2	Best Música Urbana Album	Nominated	
Grammy Awards	2023	Un Verano Sin Ti (as songwriter)	Album of the Year	Nominated	
Grammy Awards	2024	Saturno	Best Música Urbana Album	Nominated	
Grammy Awards	2026	Cosa Nuestra	Best Latin Pop Album	Pending	
Heat Latin Music Awards	2020	Himself	New Artist of the Year	Nominated	
Heat Latin Music Awards	2020	"Fantasías" (with Farruko)	Best Collab	Nominated	
Heat Latin Music Awards	2021	Himself	Best Urban Artist	Nominated	
Heat Latin Music Awards	2021	Himself	Best Artist North Region	Nominated	
Heat Latin Music Awards	2023	Himself	Best Urban Artist	Nominated	
Heat Latin Music Awards	2023	"Punto 40" (with Baby Rasta)	Best Collaboration	Nominated	
Heat Latin Music Awards	2024	Himself	Best Artist North Region	Nominated	
Heat Latin Music Awards	2025	Himself	Best Male Urban Artist	Nominated	
Heat Latin Music Awards	2025	Cosa Nuestra	Album of the Year	Nominated	
Heat Latin Music Awards	2025	"Khé?" (with Romeo Santos)	Best Video	Nominated	
iHeartRadio Music Awards	2021	Himself	Best New Latin Artist	Won	
iHeartRadio Music Awards	2022	"Todo de Ti"	Latin Pop/Reggaeton Song of the Year	Nominated	
iHeartRadio Music Awards	2022	Himself	Latin Pop/Reggaeton Artist of the Year	Nominated	
iHeartRadio Music Awards	2023	Himself	Latin Pop/Reggaeton Artist of the Year	Nominated	
iHeartRadio Music Awards	2026	"Qué Pasaría..." (with Bad Bunny)	Latin Pop/Urban Song of the Year	Nominated	
Latin American Music Awards	2021	Himself	New Artist of the Year	Won	
Latin American Music Awards	2022	Himself	Artist of the Year	Nominated	
Latin American Music Awards	2022	Himself	Favorite Male Artist	Nominated	
Latin American Music Awards	2022	Himself	Favorite Urban Artist	Nominated	
Latin American Music Awards	2022	"Todo de Ti"	Song of the Year	Nominated	
Latin American Music Awards	2022	"Todo de Ti"	Favorite Pop Song	Nominated	
Latin American Music Awards	2022	Vice Versa	Album of the Year	Nominated	
Latin American Music Awards	2022	Vice Versa	Favorite Urban Album	Nominated	
Latin American Music Awards	2023	Himself	Artist of the Year	Nominated	
Latin American Music Awards	2023	Himself	Favorite Urban Artist	Nominated	
Latin American Music Awards	2023	"Te Felicito" (with Shakira)	Song of the Year	Nominated	
Latin American Music Awards	2023	"Te Felicito" (with Shakira)	Collaboration of the Year	Nominated	
Latin American Music Awards	2023	"Te Felicito" (with Shakira)	Best Collaboration – Pop/Urban	Nominated	
Latin American Music Awards	2023	"Punto 40" (with Baby Rasta)	Best Collaboration – Pop/Urban	Nominated	
Latin American Music Awards	2023	"Desesperados" (with Chencho Corleone)	Favorite Urban Song	Nominated	
Latin American Music Awards	2023	Saturno	Favorite Urban Album	Nominated	
Latin American Music Awards	2024	Himself	Artist of the Year	Nominated	
Latin American Music Awards	2024	Himself	Streaming Artist of the Year	Nominated	
Latin American Music Awards	2024	Himself	Favorite Urban Artist	Nominated	
Latin American Music Awards	2024	Playa Saturno	Album of the Year	Nominated	
Latin American Music Awards	2024	Playa Saturno	Favorite Urban Album	Nominated	
Latin American Music Awards	2024	"Beso" (with Rosalía)	Favorite Pop Song	Nominated	
Latin Grammy Awards	2020	Himself	Best New Artist	Nominated	
Latin Grammy Awards	2021	"Todo de Ti"	Record of the Year	Nominated	
Latin Grammy Awards	2021	"Todo de Ti"	Song of the Year	Nominated	
Latin Grammy Awards	2021	"Tattoo" (remix) (with Camilo)	Best Urban Fusion/Performance	Won	
Latin Grammy Awards	2022	Dharma	Album of the Year (as songwriter)	Nominated	
Latin Grammy Awards	2022	Motomami	Album of the Year (as songwriter)	Won	
Latin Grammy Awards	2022	Un Verano Sin Ti	Album of the Year (as songwriter)	Nominated	
Latin Grammy Awards	2022	"Te Felicito" (with Shakira)	Record of the Year	Nominated	
Latin Grammy Awards	2022	"Agua" (with Daddy Yankee)	Song of the Year	Nominated	
Latin Grammy Awards	2022	"Desesperados" (with Chencho Corleone)	Best Reggaeton Performance	Nominated	
Latin Grammy Awards	2022	"Desesperados" (with Chencho Corleone)	Best Urban Song	Nominated	
Latin Grammy Awards	2022	Trap Cake, Vol. 2	Best Urban Music Album	Nominated	
Latin Grammy Awards	2023	Saturno	Best Urban Music Album	Nominated	
Latin Grammy Awards	2024	"Byak" (with Álvaro Díaz)	Best Reggaeton Performance	Nominated	
Latin Grammy Awards	2025	Cosa Nuestra	Album of the Year	Pending	
Latin Grammy Awards	2025	"Baja Pa' Acá" (with Alexis & Fido)	Best Reggaeton Performance	Pending	
Latin Music Official Italian Awards	2020	Himself	Best Latin Male Artist	Nominated	
Latin Music Official Italian Awards	2020	"Dream Girl" (remix) (with Ir-Sais)	Best Latin Remix	Nominated	
Latin Music Official Italian Awards	2020	"Fantasías" (remix) (with Farruko)	Best Latin Remix	Nominated	
Latin Music Official Italian Awards	2020	"Tattoo" (remix) (with Camilo)	Best Latin Remix	Won	
Latin Music Official Italian Awards	2020	"Tattoo" (remix) (with Camilo)	Best Latin Collaboration	Nominated	
Latin Music Official Italian Awards	2020	"Tattoo" (remix) (with Camilo)	Best Latin Male Video	Nominated	
Latin Music Official Italian Awards	2020	"Enchule"	Best Latin Video Choreography	Nominated	
Latino Music Awards	2020	"TBT" (with Sebastián Yatra & Manuel Turizo)	Best Urban Pop Song	Nominated	
Latino Music Awards	2020	"Fantasias" (remix) (with Farruko)	Best Urban Song	Nominated	
Latino Music Awards	2020	Himself	Best Urban Artist or Group	Nominated	
Latino Music Awards	2021	Himself	Artist of the Year	Nominated	
Latino Music Awards	2021	Himself	Best Male Artist – Urban	Nominated	
Latino Music Awards	2021	"Tattoo" (remix) (with Camilo)	Best Urban Song	Nominated	
Latino Music Awards	2021	"Tattoo" (remix) (with Camilo)	Music Video of the Year	Nominated	
Los 40 Music Awards	2020	Himself	Revelation Artist or Group – Latin	Nominated	
Los 40 Music Awards	2020	"Tattoo" (remix) (with Camilo)	Best Song – Latin	Nominated	
Los 40 Music Awards	2020	"4 besos" (with Lalo Ebratt & Lola Índigo)	Best Music Video of the Year – Spain	Nominated	
Los 40 Music Awards	2021	Himself	Best Urban Artist or Group – Latin	Won	
Los 40 Music Awards	2021	"Todo de Ti"	Best Song – Latin	Won	
Los 40 Music Awards	2021	"Todo de Ti"	Best Music Video – Latin	Nominated	
Los 40 Music Awards	2022	Himself	Best Urban Act or Producer – Latin	Nominated	
Los 40 Music Awards	2022	"Te Felicito" (with Shakira)	Best Song – Latin	Nominated	
Los 40 Music Awards	2022	"Te Felicito" (with Shakira)	Best Video – Latin	Won	
Los 40 Music Awards	2022	"Te Felicito" (with Shakira)	Best Collaboration – Latin	Nominated	
Los 40 Music Awards	2023	"Beso" (with Rosalía)	Best Song - Spain	Nominated	
Los 40 Music Awards	2023	Playa Saturno	Best Album - Latin	Nominated	
Los 40 Music Awards	2023	Saturno World Tour	Best Tour, Festival or Concert - Latin	Nominated	
Los 40 Music Awards	2024	Himself	Best Act - Latin	Won	
Los 40 Music Awards	2024	Himself	Best Live Act - Latin	Nominated	
Los 40 Music Awards	2024	Himself	Best Urban Act - Latin	Nominated	
Los 40 Music Awards	2024	"Déjame Entrar"	Best Song - Latin	Nominated	
Los 40 Music Awards	2024	"Touching the Sky"	Best Video - Latin	Won	
Los 40 Music Awards	2024	"Santa" (with Rvssian & Ayra Starr)	Best Urban Song - Latin	Won	
Los 40 Music Awards	2024	"Santa" (with Rvssian & Ayra Starr)	Best Urban Collaboration - Latin	Nominated	
Los 40 Music Awards	2025	Himself	Best Live Act - Latin	Pending	
Los 40 Music Awards	2025	Cosa Nuestra	Best Album - Latin	Pending	
Los 40 Music Awards	2025	"Carita Linda"	Best Video - Latin	Pending	
Los 40 Music Awards	2025	Cosa Nuestra World Tour	Best Tour, Festival or Concert - Latin	Pending	
Los 40 Music Awards	2025	"Qué Pasaría..." (with Bad Bunny)	Best Urban Collaboration - Latin	Pending	
M-V-F Awards	2021	"Baila Conmigo" (with Selena Gomez)	Best International Music Video	Won	
M-V-F Awards	2021	"Baila Conmigo" (with Selena Gomez)	Best Direction in an International Music Video	Nominated	
Master FM Awards	2021	Vice Versa	Best Latin Album of the Year	Nominated	
MTV Europe Music Awards	2020	Himself	Best Caribbean Act	Nominated	
MTV Europe Music Awards	2021	Himself	Best New Act	Nominated	
MTV Europe Music Awards	2021	Himself	Best Latin	Nominated	
MTV Europe Music Awards	2021	Himself	Best Caribbean Act	Nominated	
MTV Europe Music Awards	2022	Himself	Best Caribbean Act	Nominated	
MTV Europe Music Awards	2022	"Te Felicito" (with Shakira)	Best Collaboration	Nominated	
MTV Europe Music Awards	2023	Himself	Best Caribbean Act	Nominated	
MTV Europe Music Awards	2024	Himself	Best Latin	Nominated	
MTV Millennial Awards	2021	Himself	Himself	Nominated	
MTV Millennial Awards	2021	"Baila Conmigo" (with Selena Gomez)	Music-Ship of the Year	Won	
MTV Millennial Awards	2021	"La Nota" (with Manuel Turizo & Myke Towers)	Music-Ship of the Year	Nominated	
MTV Millennial Awards	2021	"Reloj" (with Anuel AA)	Viral Anthem	Nominated	
MTV Millennial Awards	2022	Himself	MIAW Artist	Nominated	
MTV Millennial Awards	2022	Himself and Rosalía	Flames Couple	Nominated	
MTV Millennial Awards	2022	"Problemón" (with Álvaro Díaz)	Viral Anthem	Nominated	
MTV Millennial Awards	2023	Himself	MIAW Artist	Nominated	
MTV Millennial Awards	2023	"Punto 40" (with Baby Rasta)	Reggaeton Hit	Nominated	
MTV Millennial Awards	2023	"Beso" (with Rosalía)	Global Hit of the Year	Nominated	
MTV Millennial Awards	2023	"Beso" (with Rosalía)	Music Ship of the Year	Nominated	
MTV Millennial Awards	2023	"Vampiros" (with Rosalía)	Video of the Year	Nominated	
MTV Millennial Awards	2023	Himself and Rosalía	Couple Goals	Nominated	
MTV Video Music Awards	2024	"Touching the Sky"	Best Latin	Nominated	
MTV Video Music Awards	2024	"Touching the Sky"	Best Choreography	Nominated	
MTV Video Music Awards	2024	"Touching the Sky"	Best Cinematography	Nominated	
MTV Video Music Awards	2025	"Khé?" (with Romeo Santos)	Best Latin	Nominated	
Nickelodeon Mexico Kids' Choice Awards	2020	"Tattoo" (remix) (with Camilo)	Latin Hit	Nominated	
Nickelodeon Mexico Kids' Choice Awards	2021	"Baila Conmigo" (with Selena Gomez)	Global Hit	Nominated	
Nickelodeon Mexico Kids' Choice Awards	2021	"Todo de Ti"	Catchier Song	Nominated	
Noise Colectivo Awards	2020	Himself	Underdog of the Year	Won	
Noise Colectivo Awards	2020	"Algo Mágico"	Best Animated Video	Won	
People's Choice Awards	2021	Himself	The New Artist of 2021	Nominated	
People's Choice Awards	2022	Himself	The Latin Artist of 2022	Nominated	
People's Choice Awards	2022	"Party" (with Bad Bunny)	The Collaboration Song of 2022	Nominated	
People's Choice Awards	2023	Himself	The Male Latin Artist of the Year	Nominated	
Premios Billboard Argentina	2021	"Todo de Ti"	Song of the Year – Iberoamérica	Won	
Premios Charts Ecuador	2021	Himself	International Latin Artist	Nominated	
Premios Charts Ecuador	2021	"Todo de Ti"	International Song	Won	
Premios DeGira	2020	"Tattoo" (remix) (with Camilo)	Best Song in Spanish	Nominated	
Premios DeGira	2021	Himself	Best New Artist in Spanish	Won	
Premios Juventud	2020	Himself	The New Generation – Male	Nominated	
Premios Juventud	2020	"Color Esperanza (2020)" (with Varios Artistas)	The Quarentune	Nominated	
Premios Juventud	2021	"Baila Conmigo" (with Selena Gomez)	Colaboración OMG	Nominated	
Premios Juventud	2021	"Baila Conmigo" (with Selena Gomez)	El Traffic Jam	Nominated	
Premios Juventud	2021	"Vacío" (with Luis Fonsi)	La Más Pegajosa	Nominated	
Premios Juventud	2021	"Enchule"	La Coreo Más Hot	Nominated	
Premios Juventud	2022	Himself	Male Youth Artist of the Year	Nominated	
Premios Juventud	2022	Himself	My Favorite Streaming Artist	Nominated	
Premios Juventud	2022	Himself	Trendiest Artist	Nominated	
Premios Juventud	2022	Vice Versa	Album of the Year	Nominated	
Premios Juventud	2022	"Todo de Ti"	The Catchiest Song	Nominated	
Premios Juventud	2022	"Todo de Ti"	Viral Track of the Year	Nominated	
Premios Juventud	2022	"Todo de Ti"	The Hottest Choreography	Nominated	
Premios Juventud	2022	"Nostálgico" (with Rvssian & Chris Brown)	Collaboration OMG	Nominated	
Premios Juventud	2022	"Problemón" (with Álvaro Díaz)	Best Social Dance Challenge	Nominated	
Premios Juventud	2023	Himself	Artist of the Youth – Male	Nominated	
Premios Juventud	2023	Himself	My Favorite Streaming Artist	Nominated	
Premios Juventud	2023	"Beso" (with Rosalía)	Best Song By a Couple	Won	
Premios Juventud	2023	"Suelta" (with Dímelo Flow, María Becerra, Farruko, Mr. Vegas & Fatman Scoop)	The Hottest Choreography	Nominated	
Premios Juventud	2023	"Suelta" (with Dímelo Flow, María Becerra, Farruko, Mr. Vegas & Fatman Scoop)	Best Pop/Urban Collaboration	Nominated	
Premios Juventud	2023	"Te Felicito" (with Shakira)	Best Pop/Urban Collaboration	Nominated	
Premios Juventud	2023	"Desesperados" (with Chencho Corleone)	Best Urban Mix	Nominated	
Premios Juventud	2023	Saturno	Best Urban Album – Male	Nominated	
Premios Juventud	2023	Rosalía & Rauw Alejandro	Couples That Blow Up My Social	Won	
Premios Juventud	2024	"Rauw Alejandro: Bzrp Music Sessions, Vol. 56" (with Bizarrap)	Favorite Dance Track	Nominated	
Premios Juventud	2024	"Baby Hello" (with Bizarrap)	Best Pop/Urban Collaboration	Won	
Premios Juventud	2025	Himself	Artist of the Year	Nominated	
Premios Juventud	2025	"Santa" (with Rvssian & Ayra Starr)	OMG Collaboration	Nominated	
Premios Juventud	2025	"La Nena" (with Lyanno)	Best Urban Mix	Nominated	
Premios Juventud	2026	Himself	Artist of the Youth – Male	Pending	
Premios Juventud	2026	"Carita Linda"	My Favorite Track	Pending	
Premios Juventud	2026	"Dando Vueltas"	Best Dance Track	Pending	
Premios Juventud	2026	"Buenos Términos"	Best Urban Track	Pending	
Premios Juventud	2026	"Forni" (with Los Ballers & Clarent)	Best Urban Mix	Pending	
Premios Juventud	2026	"Pongo" (with Rvssian & Wizkid)	Best Urban Rhythmic Song	Pending	
Premios Juventud	2026	Cosa Nuestra World Tour	Best Tour	Pending	
Prêmios Likes Brasil	2021	"Baila Conmigo" (with Selena Gomez)	Latin Hit of the Summer	Nominated	
Premios Lo Más Escuchado	2020	Himself	Latin Artist	Nominated	
Premios Lo Más Escuchado	2020	Afrodisíaco	Latin Album	Nominated	
Premios Lo Más Escuchado	2020	"Tattoo" (remix) (with Camilo)	Urban Song	Nominated	
Premios Lo Nuestro	2021	Himself	New Artist – Male	Nominated	
Premios Lo Nuestro	2021	"La Cama" (remix) (with Lunay, Myke Towers, Ozuna & Chencho Corleone)	Remix of the Year	Nominated	
Premios Lo Nuestro	2021	"Tattoo" (remix) (with Camilo)	Remix of the Year	Nominated	
Premios Lo Nuestro	2021	"TBT" (with Sebastián Yatra & Manuel Turizo)	Urban/Pop Song of the Year	Nominated	
Premios Lo Nuestro	2022	Himself	Artist of the Year	Nominated	
Premios Lo Nuestro	2022	Himself	Male Urban Artist of the Year	Nominated	
Premios Lo Nuestro	2022	"Todo de Ti"	Song of the Year	Nominated	
Premios Lo Nuestro	2022	"Todo de Ti"	Urban/Pop Song of the Year	Nominated	
Premios Lo Nuestro	2022	"Baila Conmigo" (with Selena Gomez)	Pop Collaboration of the Year	Nominated	
Premios Lo Nuestro	2022	"Vacio" (with Luis Fonsi)	Pop Collaboration of the Year	Nominated	
Premios Lo Nuestro	2022	"La Nota" (with Manuel Turizo & Myke Towers)	Urban Song of the Year	Nominated	
Premios Lo Nuestro	2022	Vice Versa	Urban Album of the Year	Nominated	
Premios Lo Nuestro	2023	Himself	Male Urban Artist of the Year	Nominated	
Premios Lo Nuestro	2023	"Nostalgico" (with Rvssian & Chris Brown)	Crossover Collaboration of the Year	Nominated	
Premios Lo Nuestro	2023	"Loquita" (with Reik)	The Perfect Mix of the Year	Nominated	
Premios Lo Nuestro	2023	"Te Felicito" (with Shakira)	Pop Collaboration of the Year	Won	
Premios Lo Nuestro	2023	"Te Felicito" (with Shakira)	Urban/Pop Song of the Year	Won	
Premios Lo Nuestro	2023	"Desesperados" (with Chencho Corleone)	Urban Song of the Year	Nominated	
Premios Lo Nuestro	2023	"Problemón" (with Álvaro Díaz)	Urban Collaboration of the Year	Nominated	
Premios Lo Nuestro	2024	Himself	Male Urban Artist of the Year	Nominated	
Premios Lo Nuestro	2024	Playa Saturno	Album of the Year	Nominated	
Premios Lo Nuestro	2024	Playa Saturno	Urban Album of the Year	Nominated	
Premios Lo Nuestro	2024	Saturno World Tour	Tour of the Year	Nominated	
Premios Lo Nuestro	2024	"Panties y Brasieres" (with Daddy Yankee)	Urban Song of the Year	Nominated	
Premios Lo Nuestro	2024	"Lokera" (with Lyanno & Brray)	Urban Collaboration of the Year	Nominated	
Premios Lo Nuestro	2024	"Beso" (with Rosalía)	Urban/Pop Collaboration of the Year	Nominated	
Premios Lo Nuestro	2025	Himself	Male Urban Artist of the Year	Nominated	
Premios Lo Nuestro	2025	"La Nena" (with Lyanno)	Urban Song of the Year	Nominated	
Premios Lo Nuestro	2025	"Touching the Sky"	Pop-Urban Song of The Year	Nominated	
Premios Lo Nuestro	2025	"Touching the Sky"	Pop-Urban/Dance Song of The Year	Won	
Premios Lo Nuestro	2026	Himself	Artist of the Year	Nominated	
Premios Lo Nuestro	2026	Himself	Male Urban Artist of the Year	Nominated	
Premios Lo Nuestro	2026	"Khé?" (with Romeo Santos)	Song of the Year	Nominated	
Premios Lo Nuestro	2026	"Khé?" (with Romeo Santos)	The Perfect Mix of the Year	Nominated	
Premios Lo Nuestro	2026	"Qué Pasaría..." (with Bad Bunny)	Urban Song of the Year	Nominated	
Premios Lo Nuestro	2026	"Se Fue" (with Laura Pausini)	Pop Collaboration of the Year	Nominated	
Premios Lo Nuestro	2026	"Carita Linda"	Pop/Urban Song of the Year	Nominated	
Premios Lo Nuestro	2026	"Tú Con Él"	Tropical Song of the Year	Won	
Premios Lo Nuestro	2026	Cosa Nuestra	Album of the Year	Nominated	
Premios Lo Nuestro	2026	Cosa Nuestra World Tour	Tour of the Year	Nominated	
Premios MUSA	2021	Himself	International Latin Artist of the Year	Nominated	
Premios MUSA	2021	"Todo de Ti"	International Latin Song of the Year	Won	
Premios MUSA	2022	"Te Felicito" (with Shakira)	International Collaboration of the Year	Nominated	
Premios MUSA	2023	"Beso" (with Rosalía)	International Latin Song of the Year	Nominated	
Premios MUSA	2023	"Beso" (with Rosalía)	International Collaboration of the Year	Nominated	
Premios MUSA	2024	"Santa" (with Rvssian & Ayra Starr)	International Latin Song of the Year	Nominated	
Premios Nuestra Tierra	2021	"La Nota" (with Manuel Turizo & Myke Towers)	Best Urban Song	Nominated	
Premios Nuestra Tierra	2022	"Aloha" (with Maluma, Beéle & Darell)	Best Urban Song	Nominated	
Premios Nuestra Tierra	2023	"Te Felicito" (with Shakira)	Song of the Year	Nominated	
Premios Nuestra Tierra	2023	"Te Felicito" (with Shakira)	Best Pop Song	Won	
Premios Nuestra Tierra	2023	"Te Felicito" (with Shakira)	Best Dance/Electro Song	Nominated	
Premios Nuestra Tierra	2023	"Te Felicito" (with Shakira)	Best Video	Nominated	
Premios Odeón	2022	"Tiroteo Remix" (with Marc Segui and Pol Granch)	Song of the Year	Won	
Premios Odeón	2022	"Tiroteo Remix" (with Marc Segui and Pol Granch)	Best Music Video	Won	
Premios Odeón	2022	"Tiroteo Remix" (with Marc Segui and Pol Granch)	Best Pop Song	Nominated	
Premios Odeón	2022	Himself	Latin Artist	Nominated	
Premios Odeón	2022	"Todo de Ti"	Best Latin Song	Nominated	
Premios Odeón	2022	Vice Versa	Best Latin Album	Nominated	
Prêmios Pop Mais	2021	Himself	Latin Explosion	Nominated	
Premios Quiero	2020	"Tattoo" (remix) (with Camilo)	Best Urban Video	Nominated	
Premios Quiero	2021	"Todo de Ti"	Best Urban Video	Nominated	
Premios Quiero	2021	"Todo de Ti"	Video of the Year	Nominated	
Premios Tu Música Urbano	2019	Himself	National New Urban Artist	Won	
Premios Tu Música Urbano	2019	"Tarde" (with Rafa Pabön)	National Song of the Year	Nominated	
Premios Tu Música Urbano	2019	"Toda" (remix) (with Alex Rose, Cazzu, Lenny Tavarez & Lyanno)	National Song of the Year	Nominated	
Premios Tu Música Urbano	2019	"Toda" (remix) (with Alex Rose, Cazzu, Lenny Tavarez & Lyanno)	Remix of the Year	Nominated	
Premios Tu Música Urbano	2020	Himself	Top Male New Generation	Won	
Premios Tu Música Urbano	2020	"Fantasías" (with Farruko)	Best Song New Generation	Nominated	
Premios Tu Música Urbano	2020	"Que Le Dé" (with Nicky Jam)	Best Song New Generation	Nominated	
Premios Tu Música Urbano	2020	"Mírame" (remix) (with Nio Garcia, Lenny Tavarez, Darell, Myke Towers & Casper Mágico)	Remix of the Year New Generation	Nominated	
Premios Tu Música Urbano	2022	Himself	Artist of the Year	Won	
Premios Tu Música Urbano	2022	Himself	Composer of the Year	Nominated	
Premios Tu Música Urbano	2022	"Todo de Ti"	Song of the Year	Nominated	
Premios Tu Música Urbano	2022	"Todo de Ti"	Video of the Year	Nominated	
Premios Tu Música Urbano	2022	"Agua" (with Daddy Yankee and Nile Rodgers)	Video of the Year	Nominated	
Premios Tu Música Urbano	2022	"Tiroteo Remix" (with Marc Segui and Pol Granch)	Remix of the Year	Nominated	
Premios Tu Música Urbano	2022	"Tiroteo Remix" (with Marc Segui and Pol Granch)	Video of the Year – New Artist	Nominated	
Premios Tu Música Urbano	2022	"Desesperados" (with Chencho Corleone)	Collaboration of the Year	Nominated	
Premios Tu Música Urbano	2022	"Nostálgico" (with Rvssian & Chris Brown)	Top Latin Crossover Song	Nominated	
Premios Tu Música Urbano	2022	Vice Versa	Album of the Year – Male Artist	Nominated	
Premios Tu Música Urbano	2023	Himself	Artist of the Year	Nominated	
Premios Tu Música Urbano	2023	Himself	Songwriter/Composer of the Year	Won	
Premios Tu Música Urbano	2023	Himself	Top Social Artist	Won	
Premios Tu Música Urbano	2023	"Lokera" (with Lyanno and Brray)	Song of the Year	Nominated	
Premios Tu Música Urbano	2023	"Punto 40" (with Baby Rasta)	Collaboration of the Year	Nominated	
Premios Tu Música Urbano	2023	"Party" (with Bad Bunny)	Collaboration of the Year	Nominated	
Premios Tu Música Urbano	2023	"Loco por Perrearte (Remix)" (with De La Ghetto)	Remix of the Year	Nominated	
Premios Tu Música Urbano	2023	"Te Felicito" (with Shakira)	Top Song – Pop Urban	Nominated	
Premios Tu Música Urbano	2023	"Tamo en Nota" (with Angel Dior)	Top Song – Dembow	Nominated	
Premios Tu Música Urbano	2023	"Punto 40 Año 2077" (with Baby Rasta)	Video of the Year	Nominated	
Premios Tu Música Urbano	2023	Saturno World Tour	Concert/Tour of the Year	Nominated	
Premios Tu Música Urbano	2023	Saturno	Album of the Year – Male Artist	Nominated	
Premios Tu Música Urbano	2025	Himself	Artist of the Year	Nominated	
Premios Tu Música Urbano	2025	Cosa Nuestra	Album of the Year – Male Artist	Won	
Premios Tu Música Urbano	2025	"Santa" (with Rvssian & Ayra Starr)	Song of the Year	Nominated	
Premios Tu Música Urbano	2025	"Qué Pasaría..." (with Bad Bunny)	Collaboration of the Year	Nominated	
Premios Tu Música Urbano	2025	"Touching The Sky"	Top Song - Pop	Nominated	
Premios Tu Música Urbano	2025	"Khé?" (with Romeo Santos)	Top Song - Tropical	Won	
Premios Tu Música Urbano	2025	"2:12 am" (with Latin Mafia)	Top Song - Indie	Won	
Prêmios Tudo Information	2021	"Baila Conmigo" (with Selena Gomez)	International Hit	Nominated	
Radio La Zona Awards	2021	Himself	Artist of the Year	Won	
SESAC Latina Music Awards	2020	"Que Le Dé" (with Nicky Jam)	Winning Songs	Won	
SESAC Latina Music Awards	2021	"La Nota" (with Manuel Turizo & Myke Towers)	Winning Songs	Won	
SESAC Latina Music Awards	2021	"TBT" (with Sebastián Yatra & Manuel Turizo)	Winning Songs	Won	
UK Music Video Awards	2021	"Baila Conmigo" (with Selena Gomez)	Best Pop Video – International	Nominated	
WME Awards	2022	"Te Felicito" (with Shakira)	Latin Song	Nominated	
