= Dime Quién???? =

2022 song by Rauw Alejandro

Promotional single by Rauw Alejandro

from the album Saturno
- Language: Spanish
- English title: "Tell Me Who????"
- Released: October 28, 2022
- Genre: Synth-pop; electro-pop
- Length: 2:44
- Label: Sony Latin; Duars
- Songwriters: Rauw Alejandro, Red Triangle, Josh Wilkinson, Jota Rosa, Yami, Tainy
- Producers: Raúl Ocasio "El Zorro"; Rvssian; Subelo NEO

Rauw Alejandro promotional singles chronology
| "Museo" (2022) | "Dime Quién????" (2022) | "Ron Cola" (2022) |

Music video
- "Dime Quién????" on YouTube

"Dime Quién????" (transl. "Tell Me Who????") is a song recorded by Puerto Rican singer Rauw Alejandro for his third studio album, Saturno (2022). The song was written by Red Triangle, Josh Wilkinson, Jota Rosa, Yami, and Alejandro, while the production was handled by Tainy, Red Triangle, and Alejandro. It was released by Sony Music Latin and Duars Entertainment on October 28, 2022, as the first promotional single from the album. A Spanish language synth-pop and electro-pop song, it explores the emotional complexities of losing someone and witnessing an ex moving on to a new partner. The track received widely positive reviews from music critics, who complimented its synth-pop sound and its role within the artistic evolution of the singer.

"Dime Quién????" was ranked among the 25 Best Latin Songs of 2022 by Billboard. The song charted in Spain and Billboard's Hot Latin Songs in the United States. It has received several certifications, including platinum in Mexico. An accompanying music video, released simultaneously with the song, was directed by Martin Seipel. It takes viewers on a melancholic journey through the streets of New York City, where Alejandro wanders while reflecting on old memories with his ex-partner. The song was included on the set list for Alejandro's the Saturno World Tour.

== Background and release ==
On July 25, 2022, he started his subsequent era, releasing a collaboration with Puerto Rican singers Lyanno and Brray, titled "Lokera" as the lead single from his third album. It was followed by the second single Punto 40, which was a collaboration with Baby Rasta. On October 27, 2022, Alejandro shared the artwork for the first solo release from the album, titled "Dime Quién????", announcing that it would be released within a few hours. The song was released for digital download and streaming by Sony Music Latin and Duars Entertainment as the first promotional single from Alejandro's third studio album, Saturno. The song was later included as the 15th track on the album, released November 11, 2022.

== Music and lyrics ==
Musically, "Dime Quién????" is a synth-pop and electro-pop track, influenced by '80s retro sounds, showcasing elements of both new wave and freestyle. The track features analog synth-pop and thumping bass, establishing a vibrant atmosphere that critics have likened to the high-energy vibe of classic '80s anthems such as Michael Sembello's "Maniac" and the 1984 film Footloose. The song was written by Red Triangle, Josh Wilkinson, Jota Rosa, Yami, and Alejandro, and produced by Tainy, Red Triangle, and Alejandro. It runs for a total of 2 minutes and 44 seconds.

Lyrically, "Dime Quién????", which translates to "Tell Me Who????" in English, explores the emotional complexities of losing someone and witnessing an ex moving on to a new partner. The song conveys a message to the ex, suggesting that their new relationship lacks the level of intimacy that once existed. It reflects the dread of encountering an ex with someone new on a casual social app designed for sharing candid moments. The lyrics capture a sense of heartbreak and inquiry, as Alejandro pleads to know who the sancho is, emphasizing his emotional vulnerability.

== Critical reception ==
"Dime Quién????" received generally positive reviews from music critics, who praised its synth-pop sound and its role within the artistic evolution of the Alejandro. Billboard included the song among the "7 Essential Tracks" of Saturno, highlighting its "full leap into '80s synth-pop sounds" and noting that it followed a formula similar to his global hit "Todo De Ti". Rolling Stone included "Dime Quién????" on their list of the 50 best Rauw Alejandro songs, highlighting its ability to convey vulnerability amid his musical proposal. In their album review, Pitchfork noted that the song delves into an uncomfortable and realistic territory by addressing the theme of seeing an ex-partner with someone else on social media, describing it as a "synth-driven reggaeton spaceship" that contributes to the album's eclectic mosaic of retro sounds.

Cadena 100 noted that the track transports the listener to a melancholic moment, highlighting Rauw Alejandro's innovation in the urban genre through synth-pop blends that keep his followers engaged. Los 40 noted the song's inclusion as an advance single for Saturno, highlighting its nostalgic '90s-inspired production.

=== Accolades ===
Billboard ranked "Dime Quién????" among the 25 best Latin songs of the year, highlighting Rauw Alejandro as one of the artists who "stepped outside their comfort zones" and released a "banger" as a result. The publication described the track as a "high-energy banger" with "analog synth-pop and thumping bass that harkens back to 1984's Footloose" to match Alejandro's footwork in the music video, further proving his "genre-hopping prowess while never losing his sly emo edge."

Rolling Stone critic Rob Sheffield also included "Dime Quién????" on his personal list of the Top 25 Songs of 2022, ranking it at number 18. Sheffield praised the track's nostalgic production, writing that the "Puerto Rican reggaeton superstar gives Eighties synth-pop sparkles in 'Dime Quién????'" and noted that "Alejandro knows how to do it right, zooming from freestyle to house to Saturn, the beat gleaming with confidence, while his voice drips heartbreak." Earlier in the year, Rolling Stone had already included the song in their "Songs You Need to Know" list, highlighting its emotional depth and production quality.

== Commercial performance ==
"Dime Quién????" debuted at number 44 on the US Billboard Hot Latin Songs chart on November 12, 2022, becoming Alejandro's 34th entry. Two weeks later, the track reached its peak of number 36, following the release of Saturno. The song also debuted and peaked at number 80 on Spain's official weekly chart on November 6, 2022. It was later certified gold by the Productores de Música de España (PROMUSICAE), for track-equivalent sales of over 30,000 units in the country. In Mexico, the song was certified platinum by the Asociación Mexicana de Productores de Fonogramas y Videogramas (AMPROFON), for track-equivalent sales of over 140,000 units.

== Promotion ==
=== Music video ===
A screenshot from the music video, depicting Alejandro walking in the streets of New York City.

The music video for "Dime Quién????" was released alongside the song on October 28, 2022, and was directed by Martin Seipel. The visual depicts Alejandro walking through the streets of New York City, where he reflects on memories of a past relationship. The urban setting reinforces the song's themes of heartbreak and jealousy, as he asks his former partner to reveal who she is currently with. The video concludes with Alejandro appearing to transform into a fox, a reference to his nickname "El Zorro" (Spanish for "The Fox"). Additionally, the release date for his album Saturno, November 11, 2022, is revealed at the end of the visual.

=== Live performances ===
"Dime Quién????" was included on the set list for Alejandro's the Saturno World Tour. He also performed the song as part of his medley at the 23rd Annual Latin Grammy Awards on November 17, 2022.

== Track listing ==
Digital download / streaming
| No. | Title | Length |
|---|---|---|
| 1. | "Dime Quién????" | 2:44 |

== Credits and personnel ==
Credits adapted from Tidal.

- Rauw Alejandro – associated performer, lyricist, producer
- Tainy – producer
- Red Triangle – composer, producer
- Josh Wilkinson – lyricist
- Jota Rosa – lyricist
- Yami – lyricist
- Gaby Vilar – A&R coordinator
- Mayra del Valle – A&R coordinator
- Txema Rosique – A&R director
- Marik Curet – A&R director
- Eric Pérez "Eric Duars" – executive producer
- José A. Huertas "Huertvs" – mastering engineer
- José M. Collazo "Colla" – mastering engineer
- Josh Gudwin – mixing engineer
- Jorge E. Pizarro "Kenobi" – recording engineer

== Charts ==
=== Weekly charts ===
Weekly peak performance for "Dime Quién????"
| Chart (2022) | Peak position |
|---|---|
| Spain (Promusicae) | 80 |
| US Hot Latin Songs (Billboard) | 36 |

=== Year-end charts ===
2023 year-end chart performance for "Dime Quién????"
| Chart (2023) | Position |
|---|---|
| Honduras Pop (Monitor Latino) | 56 |

== Certifications ==
Certifications and sales for "Dime Quién????"
| Region | Certification | Certified units/sales |
|---|---|---|
| Mexico (AMPROFON) | Platinum | 140,000^{‡} |
| Spain (Promusicae) | Gold | 30,000^{‡} |
^{‡} Sales+streaming figures based on certification alone.

== Release history ==
Release dates and formats for "Dime Quién????"
| Region | Date | Format(s) | Label | Ref. |
|---|---|---|---|---|
| Various | October 28, 2022 | Digital download; streaming | Sony Music Latin; Duars Entertainment | |
