= Lejos del Cielo =

2022 single by Rauw Alejandro

Single by Rauw Alejandro

from the album Saturno
- Language: Spanish
- Released: November 10, 2022
- Genre: Reggaeton
- Length: 3:29
- Label: Sony Latin; Duars
- Songwriter: Rauw Alejandro
- Producers: Mr. Naisgai; Kenobi; Raúl Ocasio "El Zorro"

Rauw Alejandro singles chronology
| "Punto 40" (2022) | "Lejos del Cielo" (2022) | "De Carolina" (2022) |

Music video
- "Lejos del Cielo" on YouTube

"Lejos del Cielo" (transl. "Far from Heaven") is a song recorded by Puerto Rican singer Rauw Alejandro for his third studio album, Saturno (2022). It was written by Alejandro, while the production was handled by Mr. Naisgai, Kenobi, and Alejandro. The song was released for digital download and streaming by Sony Music Latin and Duars Entertainment on November 10, 2022, as the third single from the album. A Spanish language slow reggaeton romantic song, it portrays the desperation of losing a beloved woman.

"Lejos del Cielo" received positive reviews from music critics, who described it as "lofty" and "great". The track reached number one in Dominican Republic. It debuted in the top 15 of the Billboard Hot Latin Songs chart and was certified gold in Spain. An accompanying music video, released simultaneously with the song, was directed by Stillz. It depicts Alejandro as a worker in another planet. One night, he turns off the energy of the entire city to concentrate it on an intense electric light that illuminates the sky, as if he made contact with an extraterrestrial ship. For further promotion, Alejandro performed the song at the 23rd Annual Latin Grammy Awards.

== Background and release ==
Rauw Alejandro released his second studio album, Vice Versa on June 25, 2021. The album debuted at number one on Billboard Top Latin Albums, giving Alejandro his first number one on the chart, and was ranked as the third-best album of 2021 and the best Spanish-language album of the year by Rolling Stone. In September 2022, he announced that he was going to release his third album in November and it would be titled Saturno. On November 10, 2022, he revealed the album's track list, mentioning it being set for release the following day. "Lejos del Cielo" was included as the fourth track on the track list and was released as the third single from the album, a few hours before the album's release.

== Music and lyrics ==
Musically, "Lejos del Cielo" is a Spanish language slow reggaeton song, with elements of electronic music. The song was written by Alejandro, while its production was handled by Mr. Naisgai, Kenobi, and Alejandro himself. The track runs for a total of 3 minutes and 29 seconds. Lyrically, "Lejos del Cielo" which translates to "Far from Heaven" in English, is an emotional romantic song that portrays the desperation of losing a beloved woman, with lyrics including, "Me tienes en el aire volando / Pero lejos del cielo / Aunque perderte da miedo / En verdad, mejor dime que no" (You have me flying in the air / But far from heaven / Although losing you is scary / Really, you better tell me no).

== Reception ==
Lucas Villa from Spin gave "Lejos del Cielo" a positive review, calling the song "lofty", noting that it "highlights Alejandro's sexy swagger". Writing for Los 40, Pascale Quililongo described the track as "great". Sónica.mx critic Ariana Gaona thought it is among those songs of Satruno "that drove his fans the most crazy".

"Lejos del Cielo" debuted and peaked at number 15 on the US Billboard Hot Latin Songs chart on November 26, 2022, becoming Alejandro's 35th entry. The song also debuted at number 26 on Spain's official weekly chart on November 20, 2022. It was later certified gold by the Productores de Música de España (PROMUSICAE), for track-equivalent sales of over 30,000 units in the country. In Latin America, "Lejos del Cielo" reached number one in Dominican Republic.

== Promotion ==
=== Music video ===
A screenshot from the music video, depicting Alejandro in front of an intense electric light.

An accompanying music video was released simultaneously with the song. The video was directed by Stillz. Alejandro plays as a worker in another planet, where aliens exist. One night, he turns off the energy of the entire city to concentrate it on an intense electric light that illuminates the sky, as if he made contact with an extraterrestrial ship. The visual also features a dance part, as Alejandro shows off his dancing skills in one of the scenes.

=== Live performances ===
On November 17, 2022, Alejandro gave a live performance of "Lejos del Cielo", "Más de Una Vez", "Desesperados", and "Punto 40" at the 23rd Annual Latin Grammy Awards. "Lejos del Cielo" was also included on the set list for Alejandro's the Saturno World Tour.

== Track listing ==
Digital download / streaming
| No. | Title | Length |
|---|---|---|
| 1. | "Lejos del Cielo" | 3:29 |

== Credits and personnel ==
Credits adapted from Tidal.

- Rauw Alejandro – associated performer, composer, lyricist, producer
- Mr. Naisgai – producer
- Jorge E. Pizarro "Kenobi" – producer, recording engineer
- Gaby Vilar – A&R coordinator
- Mayra del Valle – A&R coordinator
- Marik Curet – A&R director
- Eric Pérez "Eric Duars" – executive producer
- Chris Gehringer – mastering engineer
- Josh Gudwin – mixing engineer

== Charts ==
=== Weekly charts ===
Weekly chart performance for "Lejos del Cielo"
| Chart (2022–2023) | Peak position |
|---|---|
| Dominican Republic (Monitor Latino) | 1 |
| Spain (Promusicae) | 26 |
| US Hot Latin Songs (Billboard) | 15 |

=== Year-end charts ===
2023 year-end chart performance for "Lejos del Cielo"
| Chart (2023) | Position |
|---|---|
| Dominican Republic Urbano (Monitor Latino) | 82 |
| Venezuela Urbano (Monitor Latino) | 71 |

== Certifications ==
Certifications and sales for "Lejos del Cielo"
| Region | Certification | Certified units/sales |
|---|---|---|
| Spain (Promusicae) | Gold | 30,000^{‡} |
^{‡} Sales+streaming figures based on certification alone.

== Release history ==
Release dates and formats for "Lejos del Cielo"
| Region | Date | Format(s) | Label | Ref. |
|---|---|---|---|---|
| Various | November 10, 2022 | Digital download; streaming | Sony Music Latin; Duars Entertainment | |
| Latin America | November 11, 2022 | Contemporary hit radio | Sony Music | |
