= Punto 40 =

2022 single by Rauw Alejandro and Baby Rasta

Single by Rauw Alejandro and Baby Rasta

from the album Saturno
- Language: Spanish
- Released: September 22, 2022
- Genre: Reggaeton; rave
- Length: 3:10
- Label: Sony Latin; Duars
- Songwriters: Pedro G. Torruellas Brito; Raúl Alejandro Ocasio Ruiz
- Producers: Raúl Ocasio "El Zorro"; Jorge E. Pizarro "Kenobi"; Luis J. González "Mr. NaisGai"; Pedro G. Torruellas Brito "DJ Playero"

Rauw Alejandro singles chronology
"Party" (2022)	"Punto 40" (2022)	"Lejos del Cielo" (2022)

Baby Rasta singles chronology
"Ahumka" (2021)	"Punto 40" (2022)

Music video
- "Punto 40 Año 2077" on YouTube

"Punto 40" (transl. "Point 40") is a song recorded by Puerto Rican singers Rauw Alejandro and Baby Rasta for Alejandro’s third studio album, Saturno (2022). It was written by Alejandro and DJ Playero, while the production was handled by Alejandro, Kenobi, Mr. NaisGai, and DJ Playero. The song was released for digital download and streaming by Sony Music Latin and Duars Entertainment on September 22, 2022, as the second single from the album. A Spanish language reggaeton song, with an electronic twist, it is a remake of the classic reggaeton song "Tengo Una Punto 40" by Baby Rasta & Gringo. The song is about a man who has a .40 gun and wants to use it on his woman. The track received widely positive reviews from music critics, who complimented Alejandro's ability to "redefine the sounds" of reggaeton.

"Punto 40" was nominated for Best Collaboration – Pop/Urban at the 8th Annual Latin American Music Awards. The song was commercially successful, reaching number one in Central America, Dominican Republic, and Nicaragua, as well as the top five in several countries, such as Colombia and Spain, and on Billboard's Latin Airplay in the United States. The song has received several certifications, including 14× platinum (Latin) in the US. An accompanying futuristic music video, titled "Punto 40 Año 2077" was released on September 24, 2022, and was directed by Jora Frantzis. It shows Alejandro soaring through the cosmos and Baby Rasta serving as his wingman. The visual was nominated for Video of the Year at the 2023 Premios Tu Música Urbano. To promote the song, Alejandro performed it at the 23rd Annual Latin Grammy Awards.

== Background and release ==
Rauw Alejandro released his second studio album, Vice Versa on June 25, 2021. The album debuted at number one on Billboard Top Latin Albums, giving Alejandro his first number one on the chart, and was ranked as the third-best album of 2021 and the best Spanish-language album of the year by Rolling Stone. On July 25, 2022, he started his subsequent era, releasing a collaboration with Puerto Rican singers Lyanno and Brray, titled "Lokera" as the lead single from his third album. One week later, he deactivated his Twitter account, deleted all his posts on Instagram, and shared a video on the latter with the caption: "Take care. I love you very much, thanks for the love always, see you in a while." The footage captures Alejandro as he enters a vehicle and engages in conversation with his peers about his upcoming leisure activities and subsequent visit to the recording studio. Later in the video, a surprising twist occurs when he removes what seems to be his outer layer, revealing his extraterrestrial identity, before embarking on a journey into the cosmos.

Following his social media hiatus, rumors about his death spread online, in which his team confirmed to be fake, noting that "this strange online activity was not part of their marketing plan". On August 31, 2022, he shared an animated video on Instagram that depicts him as an alien inside a recording studio, while singing a new song in a room that seems extra terrestrially, teasing the release of his next album. He also spoke up about the fake death rumors in the caption: "Do not believe everything you see and everything you hear on the Internet, except that I am in Saturn making the most cabrón album of the year and of next year, and the year after that, and the year after that." On September 22, 2022, "Punto 40" with Baby Rasta was released for digital download and streaming by Sony Music Latin and Duars Entertainment as the second single from Alejandro's third studio album, Saturno. The song was later included as the second track on the album, released November 11, 2022.

== Music and lyrics ==
In this song, I was musically inspired by the 90s as a fan of Playe, Baby Rasta, and Gringo, and I also decided to give [‘Punto 40’] another meaning. The .40 can be your aura, your energy, what you project, your success, the baby you have by your side, your group, your art, your talent, your discipline. You kill them with that.

— Alejandro on "Punto 40".

Musically, "Punto 40" is a Spanish language reggaeton rave song, with an electronic twist. It is a remake of the classic reggaeton song "Tengo Una Punto 40" by Baby Rasta & Gringo. Alejandro's version is inspired by "the spirit of the opening theme", departing him from his synth-pop and disco aesthetic in Vice Versa. The song was written by Alejandro and DJ Playero, while the production was handled by Alejandro, Kenobi, Mr. NaisGai, and DJ Playero. The track runs for a total of 3 minutes and 10 seconds. Lyrically, "Punto 40" which translates to "Point 40" (".40" - a rimless pistol cartridge) in English, is about a man who has a .40 gun and wants to use it on his woman. The song begins with the singer repeating the phrase "Tengo una punto 40 y es para" (I have a .40 and it is for [you]), and then he starts threatening: "No me la hagas usar." ("Don't make me use it.")

== Critical reception ==
Upon release, "Punto 40" was met with widely positive reviews from music critics. Jeanette Hernandez from Remezcla gave the song a positive review, saying it is "a hard-hitting reggaeton track from the start" that showcases Alejandro's "signature vocals that continue to categorize him as one of today's most distinctive voices in el movimiento". HappyFM staff labeled it "a unique collaboration", describing the song as one "that has everything to become a great success". Writing for Los 40, Javier Sandoval opined that "Punto 40" is "an example of where Alejandro's sound is headed", showcasing why he has quickly risen to the top of urban music, as he is a "genre-diverse singer" and "redefines the sounds of [reggaeton] with each release". Uproxx reviewer Lucas Villa wrote that it "shows a harder edge to Alejandro's artistry, while accentuating his alluring charm". In 2022, Ernesto Lechner from Rolling Stone ranked the track as the singer's second-best song, naming it one of his "most striking displays of his gift as an architect of sounds".

=== Accolades ===
"Punto 40" was nominated for Collaboration of the Year at the 2023 Premios Tu Música Urbano, Best Collaboration – Pop/Urban at the 8th Annual Latin American Music Awards, Best Collaboration at the 2023 Heat Latin Music Awards, and Supreme Perreo at 10th Annual MTV MIAW Awards. The track was also recognized as an award winning song at the 2024 ASCAP Latin Awards. Rolling Stone ranked "Punto 40" as the 78th Best Song of 2022.

== Commercial performance ==
"Punto 40" is one of Alejandro's most commercially successful songs in his career, peaking at number 72 on the Billboard Global 200. The song debuted at number 32 on the US Billboard Hot Latin Songs chart on October 8, 2022, becoming Alejandro's 33rd entry, and Baby Rasta's second. On November 26, 2022, the track reached its peak of number 11. The song also peaked at numbers four and one on the Latin Airplay and Latin Rhythm Airplay charts, respectively. Thus it became Alejandro's tenth and Baby Rasta's first crowning hit on the latter. Although it did not enter the US Billboard Hot 100, "Punto 40" peaked at number one on the Bubbling Under Hot 100 Singles chart. The song was certified 14× platinum (Latin) by the Recording Industry Association of America (RIAA), for track-equivalent sales of over 840,000 units in the United States. In Spain, "Punto 40" peaked at number five and was certified double platinum by the Productores de Música de España (PROMUSICAE), for track-equivalent sales of over 120,000 units in the country. The track reached number one in Central America, Dominican Republic, and Nicaragua, as well as the top 10 in Colombia, Guatemala, Honduras, Ecuador, Guatemala, Honduras, Latin America, Panama, Peru, and Puerto Rico. In Mexico, the song was certified platinum + gold by the Asociación Mexicana de Productores de Fonogramas y Videogramas (AMPROFON), for track-equivalent sales of over 210,000 units.

== Promotion ==
=== Music video ===
A screenshot from the music video, depicting Alejandro punching a punching bag in the futuristic prison.

An accompanying music video was released on September 24, 2022. The futuristic visual titled "Punto 40 Año 2077" was directed by Jora Frantzis. It shows Alejandro soaring through the cosmos and Baby Rasta serving as his trusted companion aboard their car equipped with hydraulic systems. Another scene depicts the singers in a futuristic prison, while Alejandro shows off his "signature" choreography. "Punto 40 Año 2077" was nominated for Video of the Year at the 2023 Premios Tu Música Urbano.

=== Live performances ===
On November 17, 2022, Alejandro gave a live performance of "Lejos del Cielo", "Más de Una Vez", "Desesperados", and "Punto 40" at the 23rd Annual Latin Grammy Awards. "Punto 40" was also included on the set list for Alejandro's the Saturno World Tour.

== Track listing ==
Digital download / streaming
No.	Title	Length
1.	"Punto 40"	3:10

== Credits and personnel ==
Credits adapted from Tidal.

- Rauw Alejandro – associated performer, composer, lyricist, producer
- Baby Rasta – associated performer
- Pedro G. Torruellas Brito "DJ Playero" – composer, lyricist, producer
- Jorge E. Pizarro "Kenobi" – producer, recording engineer
- Luis J. González "Mr. NaisGai" – producer
- Marik Cuert – executive director
- Eric Pérez "Eric Duars" – executive producer
- José M. Collazo "Colla" – mastering engineer, mixing engineer

== Charts ==
=== Weekly charts ===
Weekly chart performance for "Punto 40"
Chart (2022–2023)	Peak position
Argentina Hot 100 (Billboard)	33
Central America (Monitor Latino)	1
Chile (Monitor Latino)	15
Chile Songs (Billboard)	16
Colombia (Monitor Latino)	5
Colombia Songs (Billboard)	22
Costa Rica (Monitor Latino)	11
Dominican Republic (Monitor Latino)	1
Ecuador Urbano (Monitor Latino)	12
Ecuador Songs (Billboard)	14
El Salvador (Monitor Latino)	12
Global 200 (Billboard)	72
Guatemala (Monitor Latino)	5
Honduras (Monitor Latino)	2
Latin America (Monitor Latino)	8
Mexico Songs (Billboard)	22
Nicaragua (Monitor Latino)	1
Panama (Monitor Latino)	10
Paraguay Urbano (Monitor Latino)	10
Peru (Monitor Latino)	2
Peru Songs (Billboard)	17
Puerto Rico (Monitor Latino)	7
Spain (Promusicae)	5
US Bubbling Under Hot 100 (Billboard)	1
US Hot Latin Songs (Billboard)	11
US Latin Airplay (Billboard)	4
US Latin Rhythm Airplay (Billboard)	1
Venezuela Urbano (Monitor Latino)	11

=== Monthly charts ===
Monthly chart position for "Punto 40"
Chart (2022–2023)	Peak position
Paraguay (SGP)	26

=== Year-end charts ===
2022 year-end chart performance for "Punto 40"
Chart (2022)	Position
Costa Rica Urbano (Monitor Latino)	64
Dominican Republic Urbano (Monitor Latino)	75
Honduras (Monitor Latino)	79
Nicaragua Urbano (Monitor Latino)	92
Peru Urbano (Monitor Latino)	74
Puerto Rico Urbano (Monitor Latino)	98
Spain (PROMUSICAE)	82

2023 year-end chart performance for "Punto 40"
Chart (2023)	Position
Central America (Monitor Latino)	17
Chile Urbano (Monitor Latino)	51
Colombia (Monitor Latino)	57
Costa Rica (Monitor Latino)	57
Dominican Republic (Monitor Latino)	41
Ecuador Urbano (Monitor Latino)	61
El Salvador (Monitor Latino)	64
Guatemala (Monitor Latino)	24
Honduras (Monitor Latino)	6
Latin America (Monitor Latino)	54
Nicaragua (Monitor Latino)	7
Panama (Monitor Latino)	40
Paraguay Urbano (Monitor Latino)	61
Peru (Monitor Latino)	26
Puerto Rico Urbano (Monitor Latino)	65
US Hot Latin Songs (Billboard)	61
US Latin Airplay (Billboard)	36
US Latin Pop Airplay (Billboard)	4
US Latin Rhythm Airplay (Billboard)	13
Venezuela Urbano (Monitor Latino)	43

== Certifications ==
Certifications and sales for "Punto 40"
Region	Certification	Certified units/sales
Mexico (AMPROFON)	3× Platinum+Gold	490,000^{‡}
Spain (Promusicae)	3× Platinum	180,000^{‡}
United States (RIAA)	14× Platinum (Latin)	840,000^{‡}
Streaming
Chile (Profovi)	Gold	14.886.226
^{‡} Sales+streaming figures based on certification alone.

== Release history ==
Release dates and formats for "Punto 40"
Region	Date	Format(s)	Label	Ref.
Various	September 22, 2022	Digital download; streaming	Sony Music Latin; Duars Entertainment	
Latin America	September 26, 2022	Contemporary hit radio	Sony Music	
Italy	September 30, 2022	Contemporary hit radio	Sony Music	

== See also ==
- List of best-selling singles in Spain
