= Ron Cola =

2022 song by Rauw Alejandro

Promotional single by Rauw Alejandro and Subelo NEO

from the album Saturno
- Language: Spanish
- English title: "Rum and Coke"
- Released: December 28, 2022
- Genre: Reggaeton
- Length: 3:06
- Label: Sony Latin; Duars
- Songwriter: Rauw Alejandro
- Producers: Raúl Ocasio "El Zorro"; Rvssian; Subelo NEO

Rauw Alejandro promotional singles chronology
"Dime Quién????" (2022)	"Ron Cola" (2022)	"Qué Rico Ch**gamos" (2023)

Music video
- "Ron Cola" on YouTube

"Ron Cola" (transl. "Rum and Coke") is a song recorded by Puerto Rican singer Rauw Alejandro and Puerto Rican production duo Subelo NEO for Alejandro's third studio album, Saturno (2022). The song was written by Alejandro, while the production was handled by himself, Rvssian, and Subelo NEO. It was released by Sony Music Latin and Duars Entertainment on December 28, 2022, as the second promotional single from the album. A Spanish language reggaeton song, it shares the singer's feelings for an ex-partner whom he misses and would like to know what she does late at night.

"Ron Cola" went viral on TikTok, leading to commercial success. The song reached the top 20 in Spain and was certified platinum in the country. An accompanying music video, released simultaneously with the song, was directed by Martin Seipel and Alejandro. It depicts the singer driving through the streets of Paris in a luxurious limousine on a gloomy day. He reminisces about the time he spent with a woman, and they dance to the song's rhythm in several scenes. The song was included on the set list for Alejandro's the Saturno World Tour.

== Background and composition ==
Rauw Alejandro released his second studio album, Vice Versa on June 25, 2021. The album debuted at number one on Billboard Top Latin Albums, giving Alejandro his first number one on the chart, and was ranked as the third-best album of 2021 and the best Spanish-language album of the year by Rolling Stone. In September 2022, he announced that he was going to release his third album in November and it would be titled Saturno. On November 10, 2022, he revealed the album's track list, mentioning it being set for release the following day. The album was released for digital download and streaming by Sony Music Latin and Duars Entertainment on the specified date, and "Ron Cola" was included as the 11th track on the album.

Musically, "Ron Cola" is a Spanish language reggaeton song. Written by Alejandro and produced by himself, Subelo NEO and Rvssian, the track runs for a total of three minutes and six seconds. Lyrically, "Ron Cola" which translates to "Rum and Coke" in English, shares the singer's feelings for an ex-partner whom he misses and would like to know what she does late at night. The lyrics include, "Escucha dos catorce y Yonaguni / No sé qué va a pasarme cuando la vea / ¿Cuándo te veo, baby?" ([She] listens to "2/Catorce" and "Yonaguni" / I don't know what's going to happen to me when I see her / When do I see you, baby?).

== Promotion and reception ==
A screenshot from the music video, depicting Alejandro drinking in a bar in Paris.

A few weeks after the album's release, "Ron Cola" started going viral on TikTok, leading to commercial success. On December 28, 2022, the song was released as the second promotional single from Saturno, with a music video directed by Martin Seipel and Alejandro. The music video depicts the singer driving through the streets of Paris in a luxurious limousine on a gloomy day. He reminisces about the time he spent with a woman, and they dance to the song's rhythm in several scenes. The choreography highly references the song's viral TikTok dance, imitating its moves.

"Ron Cola" was included on the set list for Alejandro's the Saturno World Tour. On March 24, 2024, the Vitoria regional chamber held an open day to celebrate its 43rd anniversary, while the celebration featured several dance performances. A group of young dancers from the Dardara Gune academy, performed a choreography in the Basque Parliament to the rhythm of "Ron Cola".

The song debuted and peaked at number 10 on the US Billboard Latin Digital Song Sales chart on December 24, 2022, becoming Alejandro's 15th top-10 hit on the chart. The track also debuted at number 73 on Spain's official weekly chart on December 4, 2022, and peaked at number 19 on December 25. It was later certified platinum by the Productores de Música de España (PROMUSICAE), for track-equivalent sales of over 60,000 units in the country.

== Credits and personnel ==
Credits adapted from Tidal.

- Rauw Alejandro – associated performer, composer, lyricist, producer
- Subelo NEO – associated performer, producer
- Rvssian – producer
- Gaby Vilar – A&R coordinator
- Mayra del Valle – A&R coordinator
- Marik Curet – A&R director
- Eric Pérez "Eric Duars" – executive producer
- Chris Gehringer – mastering engineer
- José M. Collazo "Colla" – mixing engineer
- Josh Gudwin – mixing engineer
- Jorge E. Pizarro "Kenobi" – recording engineer

== Charts ==
=== Weekly charts ===
Weekly peak performance for "Ron Cola"
Chart (2022–2023)	Peak position
Spain (Promusicae)	19
US Latin Digital Song Sales (Billboard)	10

=== Year-end charts ===
2023 year-end chart performance for "Ron Cola"
Chart (2023)	Position
Costa Rica Urbano (Monitor Latino)	79

== Certifications ==
Certifications and sales for "Ron Cola"
Region	Certification	Certified units/sales
Mexico (AMPROFON)	Platinum	140,000^{‡}
Spain (Promusicae)	Platinum	60,000^{‡}
^{‡} Sales+streaming figures based on certification alone.

== Release history ==
Release dates and formats for "Ron Cola"
Region	Date	Format(s)	Label	Ref.
Latin America	December 28, 2022	Contemporary hit radio	Sony Music	
