= De Carolina =

2022 single by Rauw Alejandro

Single by Rauw Alejandro and DJ Playero

from the album Saturno
- Language: Spanish
- Released: December 8, 2022
- Genre: Reggaeton
- Length: 3:01
- Label: Sony Latin; Duars
- Songwriter: Rauw Alejandro
- Producers: Caleb Calloway; Kenobi; Raúl Ocasio "El Zorro"; DJ Playero

Rauw Alejandro singles chronology
| "Lejos del Cielo" (2022) | "De Carolina" (2022) | "Panties y Brasieres" (2023) |

Music video
- "De Carolina" on YouTube

"De Carolina" (transl. "From Carolina") is a song recorded by Puerto Rican singer Rauw Alejandro and Puerto Rican producer DJ Playero for Alejandro's third studio album, Saturno (2022). It was written by Alejandro, while the production was handled by Caleb Calloway, Kenobi, Alejandro, and DJ Playero. The song was released by Sony Music on December 8, 2022, as the fourth single from the album. A homage to Alejandro's hometown, Carolina, Puerto Rico, where reggaeton thrived in the 1990s, the track merges the singer's modern reggaeton vision with Playero's classic style, incorporating rave-ready beats and a sped-up sample of "La Gente Sabe" to pay tribute to the city and the Puerto Rican duo Maicol & Manuel.

"De Carolina" received highly positive reviews from music critics, who complimented its lyrics and fusion of genres. It was awarded Best New Track by Pitchfork. The song reached number one in Central America, and peaked within the top 10 in Honduras, and on Billboard's Latin Digital Song Sales in the United States. It was certified gold in Spain. An accompanying music video, released simultaneously with the song, was directed by Martin Seipel. It depicts Alejandro celebrating his roots with a dynamic tour of his childhood streets, showcasing the local culture and daily life. The song was included on the set list for Alejandro's the Saturno World Tour.

== Background and release ==
In September 2022, he announced that he was going to release his third album in November and it would be titled Saturno. On November 10, 2022, he revealed the album's track list, mentioning it being set for release the following day. The album was released for digital download and streaming by Sony Music Latin and Duars Entertainment on the specified date, and "De Carolina" was included as the 17th track on the album. On December 8, 2022, the track was released as the fourth single from the album.

== Music and lyrics ==
"De Carolina", which translates to "From Carolina" in English, is a heartfelt homage to Alejandro's hometown, Carolina, Puerto Rico, where reggaeton thrived in the 1990s. He merges his modern reggaeton vision with Playero's classic style, incorporating rave-ready beats and a sped-up sample of "La Gente Sabe" to pay tribute to the city and the Puerto Rican duo Maicol & Manuel. The track is a fusion of old and new, with Playero's signature dembow beats enhanced by Alejandro's contemporary electronic flair, including bubbling synths, a pulsating bassline, and static blasts. The song was written by Alejandro, while the production was handled by Caleb Calloway, Kenobi, Alejandro, and DJ Playero. It runs for a total of three minutes and one second. The lyrics include, "Somos de Carolina y venimos virao" ("We are from Carolina, and we are coming to party").

== Critical reception ==
Upon release, "De Carolina" was met with widely positive reviews from music critics. Named Best New Track by Pitchfork, reviewer Lucas Villa described it as "a swaggering celebration of reggaeton's roots" that also "cements Alejandro's own legacy in the evolving sound of Puerto Rico". Writing for Remezcla, Villa called it "the most meaningful" song on Saturno, praising the track's fusion of Alejandro's "futuristic vision of reggaeton with the classic mixtape style of DJ Playero". Rolling Stone's Julyssa Lopez gave "De Carolina" a positive review, calling it "dynamic" and complimenting its lyrics for "stretching beyond his standard fare and paying homage to his home". She also celebrated its "thrilling, bass-heavy mash-up of influences" and wrote: "It would serve as a worthy introduction to any extraterrestrial beings ready to party on Saturn." In their review of the song, Happy FM staff applauded Alejandro's "innate talent when it comes to composing authentic hits", saying he "left his followers completely speechless" with the release of "De Carolina".

== Commercial performance ==
"De Carolina" debuted and peaked at number 7 on the US Billboard Latin Digital Song Sales chart on December 24, 2022, becoming Alejandro's 14th top-10 hit on the chart. The song also debuted at number 91 on Spain's official weekly chart on December 25, 2022. It was later certified gold by the Productores de Música de España (PROMUSICAE), for track-equivalent sales of over 30,000 units in the country. In Central America, "De Carolina" reached the summit of Monitor Latino's Hot Song chart. The track also reached the top five in Honduras and peaked within the top 20 in both Nicaragua and Peru.

== Promotion ==
=== Music video ===
A screenshot from the music video, depicting Alejandro driving in the streets of Carolina.

An accompanying music video was released on December 8, 2022. The visual was filmed in Carolina was directed by Martin Seipel. It depicts Alejandro celebrating his roots with a dynamic tour of his childhood streets, showcasing the local culture and daily life. The video features a heartfelt homage to the Puerto Rican baseball player Roberto Clemente, including a glimpse of his statue. The narrative follows the excitement of a typical day in the neighborhood, from a woman painting her nails red to boys cycling past domino players and basketball games. The day's casual encounters lead to an energetic block party, where Alejandro, joined by DJ Playero, delivers an electrifying performance that transforms into a spontaneous concert, drawing the community together in a festive culmination of hometown pride.

=== Live performances ===
"De Carolina" was included on the set list for Alejandro's the Saturno World Tour.

== Credits and personnel ==
Credits adapted from Tidal.

- Rauw Alejandro – associated performer, composer, lyricist, producer
- DJ Playero – associated performer, producer
- Caleb Calloway – producer
- Jorge E. Pizarro "Kenobi" – producer, recording engineer
- Gaby Vilar – A&R coordinator
- Mayra del Valle – A&R coordinator
- Marik Curet – A&R director
- Eric Pérez "Eric Duars" – executive producer
- José M. Collazo "Colla" – mastering engineer, mixing engineer
- José A. Huertas "Huertvs" – mastering engineer, mixing engineer

== Charts ==
=== Weekly charts ===
Weekly chart performance for "De Carolina"
| Chart (2022–2023) | Peak position |
|---|---|
| Central America (Monitor Latino) | 1 |
| Honduras (Monitor Latino) | 5 |
| Nicaragua (Monitor Latino) | 13 |
| Panama Urbano (Monitor Latino) | 11 |
| Peru (Monitor Latino) | 17 |
| Spain (Promusicae) | 91 |
| US Latin Digital Song Sales (Billboard) | 7 |

=== Year-end charts ===
2023 year-end chart performance for "De Carolina"
| Chart (2023) | Position |
|---|---|
| Central America (Monitor Latino) | 72 |
| El Salvador Pop (Monitor Latino) | 77 |
| Guatemala (Monitor Latino) | 53 |
| Honduras (Monitor Latino) | 21 |
| Nicaragua (Monitor Latino) | 37 |
| Panama Urbano (Monitor Latino) | 82 |
| Peru (Monitor Latino) | 42 |

== Certifications ==
Certifications and sales for "De Carolina"
| Region | Certification | Certified units/sales |
|---|---|---|
| Spain (Promusicae) | Gold | 30,000^{‡} |
^{‡} Sales+streaming figures based on certification alone.

== Release history ==
Release dates and formats for "De Carolina"
| Region | Date | Format(s) | Label | Ref. |
|---|---|---|---|---|
| Latin America | December 8, 2022 | Contemporary hit radio | Sony Music | |
