= Panties y Brasieres =

2023 single by Rauw Alejandro and Daddy Yankee

Single by Rauw Alejandro and Daddy Yankee

from the album Saturno
- Language: Spanish
- Released: January 26, 2023
- Genre: Reggaeton
- Length: 3:17
- Label: Sony Latin; Duars
- Songwriters: Ramón Ayala "Daddy Yankee"; Raúl Alejandro Ocasio Ruiz "Rauw Alejandro"
- Producers: Raúl Ocasio "El Zorro"; Caleb Calloway; Magicenelbeat; Jorge A. Díaz "Álvarito Díaz"

Rauw Alejandro singles chronology
"De Carolina" (2022)	"Panties y Brasieres" (2023)	"Tamo en Nota" (2022)

Daddy Yankee singles chronology
"Ulala" (2022)	"Panties y Brasieres" (2023)	"La Hora y el Día" (2023)

Music video
- "Panties y Brasieres" on YouTube

"Panties y Brasieres" (transl. "Panties and Bras") is a song recorded by Puerto Rican singers Rauw Alejandro and Daddy Yankee for Alejandro's third studio album, Saturno (2022). It was written by Daddy Yankee and Alejandro, while the production was handled by Alejandro, Caleb Calloway, Magicenelbeat, and Álvarito Díaz. The song was released for digital download and streaming by Sony Music Latin and Duars Entertainment on January 26, 2023, as the fifth single from the album. A Spanish language reggaeton song, it blends the genre's classic roots with contemporary influences, and samples Daddy Yankee's 1996 track "Camuflash". "Panties y Brasieres" is a reference to the panties and bras that fans throw onstage at Alejandro's concerts. The track received widely positive reviews from music critics, who complimented its energy and fusion of reggaeton's classic perreo and modern electronic rhythms.

"Panties y Brasieres" was nominated for Urban Song of the Year at the 36th Lo Nuestro Awards. The song was commercially successful, reaching the top 20 in Chile, Honduras, Latin America, and Puerto Rico. The song has received several certifications, including Latin quadruple platinum in the United States. An accompanying music video was released on February 7, 2023, and was directed by Alejandro himself and Martin Seipel. It depicts Alejandro as a half-human, half-robot entity in one scene, and shows the singers standing atop a mountain of bras and panties in the end. The song was included on the set list for Alejandro's the Saturno World Tour.

== Background and release ==
Rauw Alejandro released his third studio album, Saturno on November 11, 2022. The album debuted at number two on Billboard Top Latin Albums, giving Alejandro his third top five on the chart, while being ranked among the best albums of 2022 by Rolling Stone. It featured a 19-second hidden interlude, entitled "Track 7" that repeated the word "loading" over and over again. On January 23, 2023, Alejandro revealed that the hidden track would be replaced with a collaboration with Daddy Yankee, performing a preview of it at Calle San Sebastián Festival. Two days later, he announced that the song would be titled "Panties y Brasieres" and would be released the following day.

On January 26, 2023, "Panties y Brasieres" was released for digital download and streaming by Sony Music Latin and Duars Entertainment as the fifth single from Saturno and replaced "Track 7" on the album. It marked the second collaboration between Alejandro and Daddy Yankee, who had previously worked on "Agua" in 2022. During an interview with Apple Music 1's Zane Lowe, Alejandro named Daddy Yankee as an inspiration, noting that he means "reggaeton himself" for him, being "one of the first artists who put that type of genre outside the island, around the world, with his biggest hit, 'Gasolina'", that makes him "feel really, really proud". Also Daddy Yankee listed Alejandro as part of "a new generation moving reggaeton and urbano into the future" in his cover story with Rolling Stone: "It was always my goal to carry the banner and lead, and then have other people keep going."

== Music and lyrics ==
Musically, "Panties y Brasieres" is a fusion of reggaeton, blending the genre's classic roots with contemporary influences. It features a dynamic perreo rhythm that pays homage to Daddy Yankee's "old school" style, particularly through the samples from his 1996 song "Camuflash" and references to his 2005 hit "Rompe". Daddy Yankee's verses set the stage, supported by a bass-driven beat, while Alejandro adds his "signature" and "modern" rhythms, infusing the song with a fresh twist while still honoring the traditional sounds of the genre. The song was written by Daddy Yankee and Alejandro, while the production was handled by Alejandro, Caleb Calloway, Magicenelbeat, and Álvarito Díaz. The track runs for a total of 3 minutes and 17 seconds.

Lyrically, "Panties y Brasieres," which translates to "Panties and Bras" in English, refers to the garments that fans throw onstage at Alejandro's concerts. The song describes a girl, representing the singers' fans, who becomes wild and reckless when she sees Alejandro performing with Daddy Yankee. The chorus illustrates how girls can be sneaky and mischievous without anyone suspecting a thing. The rest of the lyrics explain that the girl is bad but attractive, and that Alejandro and Daddy Yankee enjoy spending time with her. The lyrics include: "La chica se suelta si ve a Rauw con el Yankee / Llueven los brasiere' y los panties, ¿qué, qué, qué? / Tú dime y te busco en la Ducati / Pa' que te pongas perry como Katy, wow" (The girl gets loose when she sees Rauw with Yankee / The bras and panties rain / Tell me when and I'll look for the Ducati / So she can get perry like Katy).

== Critical reception ==
Upon release, "Panties y Brasieres" was met with widely positive reviews from music critics. HappyFM staff opined that Alejandro "manages to leave us completely speechless" with each release, calling the song "spectacular". An author of El Espectador complimented the song's "enthusiastic energy", while Billboard's Isabela Raygoza labeled it "a vintage banger". In her review for Remezcla, Jeanette Hernandez described "Panties y Brasieres" as an "epic collab". Uproxx reviewer Lucas Villa called it "freaky", noting that Alejandro pushed "reggaeton's classic perreo sound into the future with his electronica touch".

=== Accolades ===
"Panties y Brasieres" was nominated for Urban Song of the Year at the 36th Lo Nuestro Awards, but lost to "Classy 101" by Feid and Young Miko.

== Commercial performance ==
"Panties y Brasieres" debuted and peaked at number 24 on the US Billboard Hot Latin Songs chart on February 11, 2023, becoming Alejandro's 39th entry. The song also peaked at numbers four and one on the Latin Airplay and Latin Rhythm Airplay charts, respectively. It was certified quadruple platinum (Latin) by the Recording Industry Association of America (RIAA), for track-equivalent sales of over 240,000 units in the United States. In Spain, the track debuted at number 27 on February 5, 2023. The following week, it reached its peak of number 24. It was later certified platinum by the Productores de Música de España (PROMUSICAE), for track-equivalent sales of over 60,000 units in the country. In Latin America, "Panties y Brasieres" reached the top 20 in Chile, Honduras, Latin America, and Puerto Rico.

== Promotion ==
=== Music video ===
A screenshot from the music video, depicting Alejandro and Daddy Yankee on a mountain of bras and panties.

An accompanying music video was released on February 7, 2023. The visual was directed by Alejandro himself and Martin Seipel, who had also directed the video for Alejandro's previous single "Ron Cola". The video presents a forward-thinking, computerized visual experience, showcasing a setting that's reminiscent of the end of the world, populated by mechanical beings and costumes that seem extraterrestrial. In a particular scene, Alejandro is depicted as a half-human, half-robot entity. In a different scene, Daddy Yankee is seen performing his lyrics while motorcyclists zoom by in a seemingly abandoned locale. Midway through the video, Dominican singer Ángel Dior makes a brief appearance. Concluding the video, Daddy Yankee and Alejandro are seen standing atop a mountain as bras and panties fall from the sky like rain.

=== Live performances ===
"Panties y Brasieres" was included on the set list for Alejandro's the Saturno World Tour.

== Track listing ==
Digital download / streaming
No.	Title	Length
1.	"Panties y Brasieres"	3:17

== Credits and personnel ==
Credits adapted from Tidal.

- Rauw Alejandro – associated performer, composer, lyricist, producer
- Daddy Yankee – associated performer, composer, lyricist
- Caleb Calloway – producer
- Magicenelbeat – producer
- Jorge A. Díaz "Álvarito Díaz" – producer
- Gaby Vilar – A&R coordinator
- Mayra del Valle – A&R coordinator
- Marik Curet – A&R director
- Eric Pérez "Eric Duars" – executive producer
- José M. Collazo "Colla" – mixing engineer, mastering engineer
- José A. Huertas "Huertvs" – mixing engineer, mastering engineer
- Jorge E. Pizarro "Kenobi" – recording engineer

== Charts ==
=== Weekly charts ===
Weekly chart performance for "Panties y Brasieres"
Chart (2023)	Peak position
Chile (Monitor Latino)	17
Costa Rica Urbano (Monitor Latino)	11
El Salvador Pop (Monitor Latino)	17
Honduras (Monitor Latino)	11
Latin America (Monitor Latino)	19
Peru Urbano (Monitor Latino)	17
Puerto Rico (Monitor Latino)	11
Spain (Promusicae)	24
US Hot Latin Songs (Billboard)	24
US Latin Airplay (Billboard)	8
US Latin Rhythm Airplay (Billboard)	4
Venezuela Urbano (Monitor Latino)	12

=== Year-end charts ===
2023 year-end chart performance for "Panties y Brasieres"
Chart (2023)	Position
Central America (Monitor Latino)	83
Chile (Monitor Latino)	79
Costa Rica Urbano (Monitor Latino)	55
Dominican Republic Urbano (Monitor Latino)	99
El Salvador (Monitor Latino)	71
Guatemala Pop (Monitor Latino)	67
Honduras (Monitor Latino)	22
Puerto Rico (Monitor Latino)	74
Venezuela Urbano (Monitor Latino)	50
US Hot Latin Songs (Billboard)	94
US Latin Rhythm Airplay (Billboard)	23

== Certifications ==
Certifications and sales for "Panties y Brasieres"
Region	Certification	Certified units/sales
Spain (Promusicae)	Platinum	60,000^{‡}
United States (RIAA)	4× Platinum (Latin)	240,000^{‡}
^{‡} Sales+streaming figures based on certification alone.

== Release history ==
Release dates and formats for "Panties y Brasieres"
Region	Date	Format(s)	Label	Ref.
Various	January 26, 2023	Digital download; streaming	Sony Music Latin; Duars Entertainment	
Latin America	January 27, 2023	Contemporary hit radio	Sony Music	
Italy	January 27, 2023	Contemporary hit radio	Sony Music	
