= Cosa Nuestra World Tour =

2025 concert tour by Rauw Alejandro

- Tour by Rauw Alejandro
- Location: North America; Europe; Latin America
- Associated album: Cosa Nuestra
- Start date: 5 April 2025
- End date: 29 November 2025
- No. of shows: 70

Rauw Alejandro concert chronology
- Saturno World Tour (2023); Cosa Nuestra World Tour (2025)

The Cosa Nuestra World Tour is the fifth concert tour by Puerto Rican singer Rauw Alejandro in support of his fifth studio album Cosa Nuestra (2024) and its follow up Cosa Nuestra: Capítulo 0 (2025). It commenced on 5 April 2025 in Seattle, Washington, and concluded on 29 November 2025 in San Juan, Puerto Rico, comprising 70 shows overall.

== Background ==
Rauw Alejandro released his fifth studio album Cosa Nuestra on 15 November 2024, a more reggaeton-distanced and more live instrumentation-focused record than his previous albums Saturno (2022) and Playa Saturno (2023). It received great critical and commercial success, peaking at six on the Billboard 200 and reaching the top position in Spain and on Billboard's Top Latin Albums.

On 29 November, Alejandro revealed the first date of the tour at a promotional event in San Juan, the sale of which started the following date. Three more shows at the Coliseo de Puerto Rico were announced on 2 December. A 24-date tour of the United States were announced on 6 December 2024, with tickets going on sale on Ticketmaster and Live Nation on 13 December. Due to overwhelming demand, additional dates were announced in Los Angeles, Chicago, Brooklyn, and Miami. A third show at Barclays Center was announced on 17 December.

On 4 February 2025, Alejandro announced the European leg of the tour, comprising 11 dates. The Latin American leg was announced on 14 April, with 8 dates across five countries.

== Tour dates ==
List of 2025 concerts
| Date (2025) | City | Country | Venue | Attendance | Revenue |
|---|---|---|---|---|---|
| April 5 | Seattle | United States | Climate Pledge Arena | — | — |
| April 7 | San Francisco | United States | Chase Center | — | — |
| April 8 | Sacramento | United States | Golden 1 Center | — | — |
| April 11 | Paradise (Note: Billed as Las Vegas.) | United States | T-Mobile Arena | — | — |
| April 13 | Fresno | United States | Save Mart Center | — | — |
| April 15 | Salt Lake City | United States | Delta Center | — | — |
| April 17 | Denver | United States | Ball Arena | — | — |
| April 23 | Phoenix | United States | Footprint Center | — | — |
| April 25 | Inglewood | United States | Intuit Dome | — | — |
| April 27 | Inglewood | United States | Intuit Dome | — | — |
| April 28 | Inglewood | United States | Intuit Dome | — | — |
| April 30 | San Diego | United States | Viejas Arena | — | — |
| May 1 | Anaheim | United States | Honda Center | — | — |
| May 3 | Dallas | United States | American Airlines Center | — | — |
| May 6 | Houston | United States | Toyota Center | — | — |
| May 9 | Chicago | United States | United Center | — | — |
| May 10 | Chicago | United States | United Center | — | — |
| May 14 | Baltimore | United States | CFG Bank Arena | — | — |
| May 15 | Philadelphia | United States | Wells Fargo Center | — | — |
| May 17 | Boston | United States | TD Garden | — | — |
| May 19 | Brooklyn | United States | Barclays Center | — | — |
| May 20 | Brooklyn | United States | Barclays Center | — | — |
| May 23 | Raleigh | United States | Lenovo Center | — | — |
| May 24 | Atlanta | United States | State Farm Arena | — | — |
| May 27 | Orlando | United States | Kia Center | — | — |
| May 30 | Miami | United States | Kaseya Center | — | — |
| June 5 | San Juan | Puerto Rico | Coliseo José Miguel Agrelot | — | — |
| June 6 | San Juan | Puerto Rico | Coliseo José Miguel Agrelot | — | — |
| June 7 | San Juan | Puerto Rico | Coliseo José Miguel Agrelot | — | — |
| June 8 | San Juan | Puerto Rico | Coliseo José Miguel Agrelot | — | — |
| June 17 | London | England | The O2 Arena | — | — |
| June 19 | Düsseldorf | Germany | PSD Bank Dome | — | — |
| June 20 | Amsterdam | Netherlands | Ziggo Dome | — | — |
| June 22 | Berlin | Germany | Max-Schmeling-Halle | — | — |
| June 25 | Vienna | Austria | Wiener Stadthalle | — | — |
| June 27 | Brussels | Belgium | Forest National | — | — |
| June 29 | Assago (Note: Billed as Milan.) | Italy | Unipol Forum | — | — |
| June 30 | Zürich | Switzerland | Hallenstadion | — | — |
| July 2 | Paris | France | Accor Arena | — | — |
| July 5 | Madrid | Spain | Movistar Arena | — | — |
| July 6 | Madrid | Spain | Movistar Arena | — | — |
| July 7 | Madrid | Spain | Movistar Arena | — | — |
| July 9 | Lisbon | Portugal | MEO Arena | — | — |
| July 11 | Barcelona | Spain | Palau Sant Jordi | — | — |
| July 12 | Barcelona | Spain | Palau Sant Jordi | — | — |
| October 13 | Santiago | Chile | Movistar Arena | — | — |
| October 14 | Santiago | Chile | Movistar Arena | — | — |
| October 15 | Santiago | Chile | Movistar Arena | — | — |
| October 18 | Buenos Aires | Argentina | Movistar Arena | — | — |
| October 19 | Buenos Aires | Argentina | Movistar Arena | — | — |
| October 20 | Buenos Aires | Argentina | Movistar Arena | — | — |
| October 22 | São Paulo | Brazil | Vibra São Paulo | — | — |
| October 26 | Bogotá | Colombia | Movistar Arena | — | — |
| October 27 | Bogotá | Colombia | Movistar Arena | — | — |
| October 28 | Bogotá | Colombia | Movistar Arena | — | — |
| November 2 | Monterrey | Mexico | Arena Monterrey | — | — |
| November 4 | Mexico City | Mexico | Palacio de los Deportes | — | — |
| November 5 | Mexico City | Mexico | Palacio de los Deportes | — | — |
| November 6 | Mexico City | Mexico | Palacio de los Deportes | — | — |
| November 8 | Mexico City | Mexico | Palacio de los Deportes | — | — |
| November 9 | Mexico City | Mexico | Palacio de los Deportes | — | — |
| November 15 | Tlajomulco de Zúñiga (Note: Billed as Guadalajara.) | Mexico | Arena VFG | — | — |
| November 16 | Tlajomulco de Zúñiga | Mexico | Arena VFG | — | — |
| November 18 | Monterrey | Mexico | Arena Monterrey | — | — |
| November 19 | Monterrey | Mexico | Arena Monterrey | — | — |
| November 24 | San Juan | Puerto Rico | Coliseo José Miguel Agrelot | — | — |
| November 25 | San Juan | Puerto Rico | Coliseo José Miguel Agrelot | — | — |
| November 26 | San Juan | Puerto Rico | Coliseo José Miguel Agrelot | — | — |
| November 28 | San Juan | Puerto Rico | Coliseo José Miguel Agrelot | — | — |
| November 29 | San Juan | Puerto Rico | Coliseo José Miguel Agrelot | — | — |
| Total | | | | — | — |
