= Algo Mágico =

2020 song by Rauw Alejandro

Promotional single by Rauw Alejandro

from the album Afrodisíaco
- Language: Spanish
- Released: June 25, 2020
- Genre: Contemporary pop; electronic house
- Length: 4:21
- Label: Sony Latin; Duars
- Songwriters: Luis J. González "Mr. NaisGai"; Raúl Alejandro Ocasio Ruiz "Rauw Alejandro"; Jesus D. Valencia; Stiven Rojas "Miky"; Juan Luis Cardona "Maiky"; Michael Sánchez "Elektrik"; Julian Yepez "Maya"; Juan José Duque "Sinatra"; José M. Collazo "Colla"; Eric Pérez Rovira "Eric Duars"
- Producers: Elektrik; Mr. Naisgai; Maya; Sinatra; Miky; Maiky; Caleb Calloway

Rauw Alejandro Promotional singles chronology
"Ponte Pa' Mí" (2020)	"Algo Mágico" (2020)	"Perreo Pesau'" (2020)

Music video
- "Algo Mágico" on YouTube

"Algo Mágico" (transl. "Something Magical") is a song recorded by Puerto Rican singer Rauw Alejandro for his debut studio album, Afrodisíaco (2020). The song was written by Mr. NaisGai, Alejandro, Jesus D. Valencia, Miky, Maiky, Elektrik, Maya, Sinatra, Colla, Eric Duars, while the production was handled by Elektrik, Mr. Naisgai, Maya, Sinatra, Miky, Maiky, and Caleb Calloway. It was released for digital download and streaming by Sony Music Latin and Duars Entertainment on June 25, 2020, as the second promotional single from the album. A Spanish language contemporary pop and electronic house song, it is "an oath to inner beauty and unconditional love", meant to be dedicated to someone special.

"Algo Mágico" received positive reviews from music critics, who complimented its fusion of genres and sounds. The song peaked at numbers 69 and 100 in Spain and Argentina, respectively, and was certified diamond + platinum in Mexico. An accompanying fanciful animated music video, released simultaneously with the song, was directed by Sebastián Mejia. The visual depicts two masked people traveling the world on a dragon, as they get to know each other deeply and unmask their feelings. It won the award for Best Animated Video at the 2020 Noise Colectivo Awards. A remix by Dutch-Moroccan producer R3hab was released on March 11, 2021, which was accompanied by another animated music video.

== Background and release ==
In January 2020, Rauw Alejandro revealed the titles of four of his upcoming songs, including "Algo Mágico". In February 2020, he announced that he was working on his debut studio album Afrodisíaco. On May 19, 2020, he confirmed that "Algo Mágico" would be included in the album. Two weeks later he announced that the song was set to release in June 2020, noting that it is "a very special" song for him. The track was released for digital download and streaming by Sony Music Latin and Duars Entertainment as the second promotional single from Afrodisíaco on June 25, 2020. It was later included as the 13th track on the album, released November 13, 2020.

== Music and lyrics ==
"Algo Mágico"
A 26-second sample of the chorus, which features a fusion of genres.

Musically, "Algo Mágico", is a Spanish language contemporary pop and electronic house song, with elements of trap, reggaeton, dance, pop-R&B, synth-pop, house, and urbano music. It was written by Mr. NaisGai, Alejandro, Jesus D. Valencia, Miky, Maiky, Elektrik, Maya, Sinatra, Colla, Eric Duars, with its production being handled by Elektrik, Mr. Naisgai, Maya, Sinatra, Miky, Maiky, and Caleb Calloway. The track runs for a total of 4 minutes and 21 seconds.

Lyrically, "Algo Mágico" which translates to "Something Magical" in English, it is "an oath to inner beauty and unconditional love", meant to be dedicated to someone special. It talks about a relationship that starts unexpectedly and that, as time goes by, many feelings emerge, thus becoming a song with a "public declaration of love". The lyrics include, "Sigo buscando las palabras / Pa' poderlo describir / Es algo mágico / Que tiene tu mirada / Que me hipnotizó" (I keep looking for the words / To be able to describe it / It's something magical / What does your look have? / that hypnotized me).

== Reception ==
=== Critical ===
Upon release, "Algo Mágico" was met with positive reviews from music critics. Jessica Roiz from Billboard praised the song's "innovative melodies" that flaunt the singer's "other artistic side" in addition to his reggaeton hits. She continued admiring the fusion of sounds and rhythms in the track that gives an "infectious dance beat", comparing it with Daft Punk and The Weeknd discography. Writing for El Sol de Tijuana, Andreína Longoria stated that Alejandro "demonstrates the versatility of his art and composition" with the song, incorporating sounds from different genres. Grammy.com critic Ecleen Luzmila Caraballo described it as "a futuristic pop song that lives up to its name". Rolling Stone's Julyssa Lopez ranked the track among Alejandro's 10 Essential Songs, calling its production "futuristic". Also from Rolling Stone, Ernesto Lechner ranked "Algo Mágico" as the singer's 14th-best song and labeled it "the defining point where he weaves a personal language informed by trap and reggaetón, [while being inspired by] the Eighties pop".

=== Commercial ===
"Algo Mágico" debuted and peaked at number 69 on Spain's official weekly chart on May 7, 2020. It was later certified platinum by the Productores de Música de España (PROMUSICAE), for track-equivalent sales of over 60,000 units in the country. In Latin America, the song entered Billboard Argentina Hot 100 at number 100 on September 12, 2020, and was certified diamond + platinum + gold by the Asociación Mexicana de Productores de Fonogramas y Videogramas (AMPROFON), for track-equivalent sales of over 390,000 units in Mexico.

== Promotion ==
=== Music video ===
A screenshot from the music video, depicting two masked animated characters traveling the world on a dragon.

An accompanying fanciful animated music video was released simultaneously with the song. The visual was directed by Sebastián Mejia and inspired by Japanese-style characters. It depicts two masked people traveling the world on a dragon, as they get to know each other deeply and unmask their feelings. As animated music videos had gone viral because of COVID-19 pandemic restrictions at the time, Billboard highlighted 10 animated music videos released in 2020, asking their readers to vote for their favorite one, in which "Algo Mágico" was voted the best animated music video of the year. The video also won the award for Best Animated Video at the 2020 Noise Colectivo Awards.

On July 7, 2020, Alejandro uploaded a dance video on his YouTube channel, which features himself dancing alongside his choreographer Fefe Burgos.

=== Live performances ===
"Algo Mágico" was included on the set lists for Alejandro's the Rauw Alejandro World Tour and the Vice Versa Tour.

=== Remix ===
A remix by Dutch-Moroccan producer R3hab was released on March 11, 2021. It was accompanied by an animated music video that continues the concept proposed by the original video, depicting a digitized Alejandro with a fox mask and portraying a dreamy and romantic journey.

== Track listings ==
Digital download / streaming
No.	Title	Length
1.	"Algo Mágico"	4:21

Digital download / streaming
No.	Title	Length
1.	"Algo Mágico (R3hab Remix)"	2:47

== Credits and personnel ==
Credits adapted from Tidal.

- Rauw Alejandro – associated performer, composer, lyricist
- Luis J. González "Mr. NaisGai" – composer, lyricist, producer, mixing engineer, performance arranger, piano
- Jesus D. Valencia – composer, lyricist
- Miky – composer, lyricist, producer
- Maiky – composer, lyricist, producer
- Elektrik – composer, lyricist, producer
- Maya – composer, lyricist, producer
- Sinatra – composer, lyricist, producer
- José M. Collazo "Colla" – composer, lyricist, mastering engineer, mixing engineer, recording engineer
- Eric Pérez Rovira "Eric Duars" – composer, lyricist, executive producer
- Caleb Calloway – producer
- Amber Rubi Urena – A&R coordinator
- John Eddie Pérez – A&R director

== Charts ==
Weekly peak performance for "Algo Mágico"
Chart (2020)	Peak position
Argentina Hot 100 (Billboard)	100
Peru Streaming (UNIMPRO)	106
Spain (Promusicae)	69

== Certifications ==
Certifications and sales for "Algo Mágico"
Region	Certification	Certified units/sales
Colombia	Platinum	
Mexico (AMPROFON)	2× Diamond+4× Platinum	840,000^{‡}
Spain (Promusicae)	Platinum	60,000^{‡}
Streaming
Central America (CFC)	Platinum	7,000,000^{†}
^{‡} Sales+streaming figures based on certification alone.^{†} Streaming-only figures based on certification alone.

== Release history ==
Release dates and formats for "Algo Mágico"
Region	Date	Format	Version	Label	Ref(s)
Various	June 25, 2020	Digital download; streaming	Original	Sony Music Latin; Duars Entertainment	
Various	March 11, 2021	Digital download; streaming	Remix	Sony Music Latin; Duars Entertainment	
