= Lokera =

2022 single by Rauw Alejandro, Lyanno, and Brray

Single by Rauw Alejandro, Lyanno, and Brray

from the album Saturno
- Language: Spanish
- Released: July 25, 2022
- Genre: Reggaeton; electronic; perreo
- Length: 3:15
- Label: Sony Latin; Duars
- Songwriters: Raúl Alejandro Ocasio Ruiz; Edgar R. Cuevas; Bryan García Quinones "Brray"
- Producers: Luis Jonuel González "Mr. NaisGai"; Raúl Ocasio "El Zorro"; Héctor C. López Jiménez "Caleb Calloway"

Rauw Alejandro singles chronology
"Sci-Fi" (2022)	"Lokera" (2022)	"Party" (2022)

Lyanno singles chronology
"Psycho" (2022)	"Lokera" (2022)	"Perfect" (2022)

Brray singles chronology
"No Money No Honey" (2022)	"Lokera" (2022)	"Haha (Latin Remix)" (2022)

Music video
- "Lokera" on YouTube

"Lokera" is a song by Puerto Rican singers Rauw Alejandro, Lyanno and Brray, for Alejandro's third studio album, Saturno (2022). It was written by Alejandro, Lyanno, and Brray, while the production was handled by Mr. NaisGai, Alejandro, and Caleb Calloway. The song was released for digital download and streaming by Sony Music Latin and Duars Entertainment on July 25, 2022, as the lead single from the album. A Spanish language reggaeton and electronic perreo, it portrays the thrill of waking up in a stranger's bed. The track received widely positive reviews from music critics, who complimented its infectious and danceable rhythm and the singers' vocals.

"Lokera" was nominated for Urban Collaboration of the Year at the 36th Lo Nuestro Awards. The song was commercially successful, reaching the top 10 in eight countries, including Colombia and Chile, and on Billboard's Hot Latin Songs in the United States. It also became Lyanno's first entry on the Billboard Hot 100. The song has received several certifications, including 22× platinum (Latin) in the United States. An accompanying music video, released simultaneously with the song, was directed by Marlon Peña and Alejandro himself.

== Background and release ==
Rauw Alejandro released his second studio album, Vice Versa on June 25, 2021. The album debuted at number one on Billboard Top Latin Albums, giving Alejandro his first number one on the chart, and was ranked as the third-best album of 2021 and the best Spanish-language album of the year by Rolling Stone. Following his successful era, he tweeted on July 23, 2022, to clap back at his haters who criticize him for making music for TikTok: "TikTok is what the world uses, so rather music for the world, later they will create another platform and everyone will use it the same." A few hours later, he announced the title of his new song made for TikTok, to be "Lokera", which would be a collaboration with Lyanno and Brray.

On July 25, 2022, "Lokera" was released for digital download and streaming by Sony Music Latin and Duars Entertainment as the lead single from Alejandro's third studio album, Saturno. The song was later included as the last track on the album, released November 11, 2022.

== Music and lyrics ==
Musically, "Lokera" is a Spanish language reggaeton and electronic perreo. The song was written by Alejandro, Lyanno, and Brray. Its production was handled by Mr. NaisGai, Alejandro, Caleb Calloway, and Slow Jamz, and the track runs for a total of 3 minutes and 15 seconds. Lyrically, "Lokera" portrays the thrill of waking up in a stranger's bed, with lyrics including, "Despertar en otra cama que no sea la mía / Me importa un bicho mi ex, si es tremenda porquería, jaja" (Waking up in another bed that is not mine / I don't give a damn about my ex, if it's tremendous crap, haha).

== Critical reception ==
Upon release, "Lokera" was met with widely positive reviews from music critics. In his review for Latina, Lucas Villa described Alejandro and Lyanno as "a dream duo" with "alluring vocals" that makes the song "more irresistible". He added that "Alejandro will continue to rule the dance floor with 'Lokera' in his arsenal". An author of Monitor Latino labeled it "a theme for the party" and named Alejandro "one of the main exponents of urban music in recent years". Remezcla's Jeanette Hernandez described "Lokera" as "hot", while Alberto Palao Murcia from Los 40 named it a "collaboration full of rhythm". Writing for The Fader, Jordan Darville noted that it "has a red-bloodiness that's as infectious as it is unsavory", naming Lyanno and Brray the "perfect wingmen for the track". Ernesto Lechner from Rolling Stone ranked the track as Alejandro's 36th-best song, and Billboard staff listed it among the "7 Essential Tracks" on Saturno.

=== Accolades ===
"Lokera" was nominated for Song of the Year at the 2023 Premios Tu Música Urbano, and Urban Collaboration of the Year at the 36th Lo Nuestro Awards. The track was also recognized as an award winning song at the 2024 BMI Latin Awards, as well as the 2024 ASCAP Latin Awards.

== Commercial performance ==
"Lokera" is one of Alejandro's most commercially successful songs in his career, peaking at number 55 on the Billboard Global 200. The song debuted at number 37 on the US Billboard Hot Latin Songs chart on August 13, 2022, becoming Alejandro's 32nd entry, as well as both Lyanno and Brray's second. On December 24, 2022, the track reached its peak of number nine, giving Alejandro his ninth top-10 hit on the chart, Lyanno his first, and Brray his second. "Lokera" debuted at number 99 on the US Billboard Hot 100 on the chart issue dated October 22, 2022, becoming Alejandro's sixth entry on the chart, Lyanno's first and Brray's second. The song was certified 22× platinum (Latin) by the Recording Industry Association of America (RIAA), for track-equivalent sales of over 1.320,000 units in the United States. In Spain, "Lokera" peaked at number 12 and was certified triple platinum by the Productores de Música de España (PROMUSICAE), for track-equivalent sales of over 180,000 units in the country. The track reached the top 10 in Colombia, Chile, Dominican Republic, Ecuador, Guatemala, Honduras, and Peru. It also peaked in the top 20 of Bolivia, Costa Rica, El Salvador, Latin America, Mexico, and Puerto Rico. In Mexico, the song was certified 4× platinum + gold by the Asociación Mexicana de Productores de Fonogramas y Videogramas (AMPROFON), for track-equivalent sales of over 630,000 units.

== Promotion ==
=== Music video ===
An accompanying music video was released simultaneously with the song. The visual was directed by the Marlon Peña and Alejandro himself. The scene opens with Alejandro putting on his clothes after a hookup. The camera then captures the nocturnal activities of Lyanno, who delivers his verse among people dancing, drinking, and having fun in San Juan, Puerto Rico. A different shot shows Rauw being confronted by a man outside a bathroom, and Lyanno intervenes to prevent a potential conflict. The man is escorted out by the crowd, while Rauw expresses his gratitude to Lyanno for his assistance. Next, Brray performs his rap as a woman dances sensually with him. The video ends with the attendees jumping into a pool filled with inflatable toys. However, their enjoyment is cut short by a police raid that terminates their splendid time.

=== Live performances ===
"Lokera" was included on the set list for Alejandro's the Saturno World Tour.

== Track listing ==
Digital download / streaming
No.	Title	Length
1.	"Lokera"	3:15

== Credits and personnel ==
Credits adapted from Tidal.

- Rauw Alejandro – associated performer, composer, lyricist, producer
- Lyanno – associated performer, composer, lyricist
- Brray – associated performer, composer, lyricist
- Slow Jamz – producer
- Luis J González "Mr. NaisGai" – producer
- Hector C. Lopez Jiménez "Caleb Calloway" – producer
- José M. Collazo "Colla" – mixing engineer, mastering engineer
- José A. Huertas "Huertvs" – mixing engineer, mastering engineer
- Jorge E. Pizarro "Kenobi" – recording engineer
- Mayra del Valle – A&R coordinator
- Gaby Vilar – A&R coordinator
- Marik Curet – A&R director
- John Eddie Pérez – A&R director
- Eric Pérez "Eric Duars" – executive producer

== Charts ==
=== Weekly charts ===
Weekly chart performance for "Lokera"
Chart (2022–2023)	Peak position
Argentina Hot 100 (Billboard)	74
Bolivia Songs (Billboard)	13
Chile Songs (Billboard)	10
Colombia (Monitor Latino)	2
Colombia Songs (Billboard)	18
Costa Rica (Monitor Latino)	18
Dominican Republic (Monitor Latino)	9
Ecuador Songs (Billboard)	6
El Salvador (Monitor Latino)	17
Global 200 (Billboard)	55
Guatemala (Monitor Latino)	7
Honduras (Monitor Latino)	8
Latin America (Monitor Latino)	17
Mexico Songs (Billboard)	16
Panama Urbano (Monitor Latino)	17
Peru (Monitor Latino)	7
Peru Songs (Billboard)	6
Puerto Rico (Monitor Latino)	16
Spain (Promusicae)	13
US Billboard Hot 100	99
US Hot Latin Songs (Billboard)	9
US Latin Airplay (Billboard)	16
US Latin Rhythm Airplay (Billboard)	6

=== Monthly charts ===
Monthly chart position for "Lokera"
Chart (2022–2023)	Peak position
Paraguay (SGP)	35

=== Year-end charts ===
2022 year-end chart performance for "Lokera"
Chart (2022)	Position
Colombia (Monitor Latino)	15
Costa Rica Urbano (Monitor Latino)	53
Dominican Republic (Monitor Latino)	88
Guatemala Pop (Monitor Latino)	85
Honduras (Monitor Latino)	94
Latin America (Monitor Latino)	81
Peru (Monitor Latino)	90
Puerto Rico (Monitor Latino)	94
Spain (PROMUSICAE)	60
US Hot Latin Songs (Billboard)	56

2023 year-end chart performance for "Lokera"
Chart (2023)	Position
Central America (Monitor Latino)	70
Chile Urbano (Monitor Latino)	84
Colombia (Monitor Latino)	88
Costa Rica (Monitor Latino)	82
Dominican Republic (Monitor Latino)	38
El Salvador (Monitor Latino)	76
Global Excl. US (Billboard)	195
Guatemala (Monitor Latino)	42
Honduras (Monitor Latino)	40
Latin America (Monitor Latino)	77
Panama Urbano (Monitor Latino)	60
Peru (Monitor Latino)	23
US Hot Latin Songs (Billboard)	68
US Latin Rhythm Airplay (Billboard)	42

== Certifications ==
Certifications and sales for "Lokera"
Region	Certification	Certified units/sales
Italy (FIMI)	Gold	50,000^{‡}
Mexico (AMPROFON)	Diamond+4× Platinum	1,260,000^{‡}
Spain (Promusicae)	4× Platinum	400,000^{‡}
United States (RIAA)	22× Platinum (Latin)	1,320,000^{‡}
Streaming
Chile (Profovi)	Platinum	26.901.609
^{‡} Sales+streaming figures based on certification alone.

== Release history ==
Release dates and formats for "Lokera"
Region	Date	Format(s)	Label	Ref.
Various	July 25, 2022	Digital download; streaming	Sony Music Latin; Duars Entertainment	
Latin America	August 5, 2022	Contemporary hit radio	Sony Music Latin; Duars Entertainment	
Italy	August 5, 2022	Contemporary hit radio	Sony Music Latin; Duars Entertainment	

== See also ==
- List of best-selling singles in Spain
- List of Latin songs on the Billboard Hot 100
