= Saturno (album) =

Studio album by Rauw Alejandro
- Released: November 11, 2022
- Recorded: 2022
- Genre: Miami bass; reggaeton; eurodance; techno
- Length: 54:03
- Language: Spanish
- Label: Sony Latin; Duars
- Producer: El Zorro; Kenobi; Mr. NaisGai; DJ Playero; MadMusick; Súbelo NEO; Rvssian; Caleb Calloway; Red Triangle; Tainy; Slow Jamz; Magic en el Beat

Rauw Alejandro chronology
Trap Cake, Vol. 2 (2022)	Saturno (2022)	RR (2023)

Singles from Saturno
- 1. "Lokera" Released: July 25, 2022; 2. "Punto 40" Released: September 22, 2022; 3. "Lejos del Cielo" Released: November 10, 2022; 4. "De Carolina" Released: December 8, 2022; 5. "Panties y Brasieres" Released: January 26, 2023

Saturno (Spanish for "Saturn") is the third studio album by Puerto Rican singer Rauw Alejandro. It was released on November 11, 2022, through Sony Music Latin and Duars Entertainment. The album features collaborations with Baby Rasta, DJ Playero, Chris Palace, Arcángel, Súbelo NEO, Lyanno and Brray.

== Singles ==
The first single of the album was "Lokera", a collaboration with Lyanno and Brray released on July 25, 2022. The second single was "Punto 40" with Baby Rasta, released on September 22, 2022.

Following the success of "Punto 40", Alejandro released "Dime Quién????" on October 28, 2022. On November 10, 2022, he released the video of "Lejos del Cielo".

The album's final single, "Panties y Brasieres" was released on January 26, 2023.

== Critical reception ==
Professional ratings
Review scores
Source	Rating
Pitchfork	7.6/10
Rolling Stone	4/5 stars

Julyssa Lopez of Rolling Stone says Rauw Alejandro finds his own place in the pop cosmos on Saturno.

== Commercial performance ==
Saturno debuted at number 25 on the US Billboard 200, including number 2 on both the Top Latin Albums and Latin Rhythm Albums charts with 19,000 album-equivalent units.

== Track listing ==
Saturno track listing
No.	Title	Writer(s)	Producer(s)	Length
1.	"Saturno"	Raúl Alejandro Ocasio Ruiz	El Zorro; Kenobi; Mr. NaisGai	1:31
2.	"Punto 40" (with Baby Rasta)	Ocasio; Pedro Torruellas	El Zorro; Kenobi; Mr. NaisGai; DJ Playero	3:10
3.	"Más de Una Vez"	Ocasio	El Zorro; Kenobi; Mr. NaisGai	4:05
4.	"Lejos del Cielo"	Ocasio	El Zorro; Kenobi; Mr. NaisGai	3:28
5.	"Dejau'" (with DJ Playero)	Ocasio	El Zorro; Kenobi; DJ Playero	3:02
6.	"Gatas" (with Chris Palace)	Ocasio; Christian Palacios; Omar Valdez	El Zorro; MadMusick	3:27
7.	"Panties y Brasieres" (with Daddy Yankee)	Ocasio; Ramón Ayala	El Zorro; Caleb Calloway; Alvarito Díaz; Magic en el Beat	3:17
8.	"Cazadores" (with Arcángel)	Ocasio; Austin Santos	El Zorro; Kenobi; Mr. NaisGai	3:46
9.	"Deca' a Las Vegas (interlude)"	Ocasio	El Zorro; Mr. NaisGai	1:27
10.	"Qué Rico Chingamos"	Ocasio	El Zorro; Kenobi	4:06
11.	"Ron Cola" (with Súbelo NEO)	Ocasio	El Zorro; Súbelo NEO; Rvssian	3:06
12.	"No Me Sueltes"	Ocasio	El Zorro; Mr. NaisGai	2:42
13.	"Verde Menta"	Ocasio	El Zorro; Kenobi; Mr. NaisGai; Calloway	3:08
14.	"Corazón Despeinado"	Ocasio	El Zorro; Kenobi; Mr. NaisGai	3:27
15.	"Dime Quién????"	Ocasio; James Bell; Abner Cordero Boria; Red Triangle; Josh Wilkinson	El Zorro; Red Triangle; Tainy	2:44
16.	"Rauleeto (Skit)"	Ocasio	El Zorro	1:10
17.	"De Carolina" (with DJ Playero)	Ocasio	El Zorro; Kenobi; DJ Playero; Calloway	3:01
18.	"Lokera" (with Lyanno and Brray)	Ocasio; Edgar Cuevas; Bryan García Quiñones	El Zorro; Mr. NaisGai; Caleb Calloway; Slow Jamz	3:17
Total length:				54:03

Note

- All track titles are stylized in all caps.

== Personnel ==
Musicians

- Rauw Alejandro – vocals
- Katriana Huguet – background vocals (tracks 3, 9, 14)
- Alessandra Bregante – background vocals (3, 14)
- Samantha Cámara – background vocals (3, 14)
- Wendy Besada Rodríguez – background vocals (3, 14)

Technical

- Josh Gudwin – mixing (1, 3, 4, 6, 8–)
- José "Colla" Collazo – mixing (2, 5, 7, 8, 10, 11, 16, 17), mastering (2, 5, 7, 14–17)
- José "Huertvs" Huertas – mixing (2, 5, 7, 16, 17), mastering (5, 7, 14–17)
- Chris Gehringer – mastering (1, 3, 4, 6, 8–14)
- Jorge "Kenobi" Pizarro Ruiz – engineering
- Samuel "Ehxx the Professor" Serrano – engineering (8)
- Eric Duars – executive production

== Charts ==
=== Weekly charts ===
Weekly chart performance for Saturno
Chart (2022)	Peak position
Spanish Albums (Promusicae)	2
US Billboard 200	25
US Latin Rhythm Albums (Billboard)	2
US Top Latin Albums (Billboard)	2

=== Year-end charts ===
2022 year-end chart performance for Saturno
Chart (2022)	Position
Spanish Albums (PROMUSICAE)	38

2023 year-end chart performance for Saturno
Chart (2023)	Position
Spanish Albums (PROMUSICAE)	7
US Billboard 200	173
US Top Latin Albums (Billboard)	7

== Certifications ==
Certifications for Saturno
Region	Certification	Certified units/sales
Mexico (AMPROFON)	Platinum+Gold	210,000^{‡}
Spain (Promusicae)	Platinum	40,000^{‡}
United States (RIAA)	7× Platinum (Latin)	420,000^{‡}
^{‡} Sales+streaming figures based on certification alone.
