= Lyanno =

Puerto Rican singer

- Born: Edgardo Rafael Cuevas Feliciano; April 22, 1995 (age 31)
- Origin: Puerto Rico
- Genres: Reggaetón; Latin R&B; Latin trap
- Occupations: Singer; songwriter; rapper
- Instrument: Vocals
- Label: Rimas

Edgardo Rafael Cuevas Feliciano (San Juan; Puerto Rico, April 22, 1995) better known by his stage name as Lyanno, is a Puerto Rican singer and songwriter.

== Music career ==
He studied sound engineering at the Liceo de Arte y Tecnología of San Juan in Puerto Rico. His beginnings in music were with the singer Almighty, who gave him the opportunity to work in his studio as a music producer.

In 2015 he began his career as a singer under the name of "Gardo", becoming known in the music industry with his song "Frutos prohibidos", this being a mix of R&B with Hip hop. At first, his music was broad in content and with this style he released two EPs: S.O.D.A (2016) and AM (2017).

In 2017 he changed name was changed from Gardo to Lyanno. Starting a new stage in music, releasing the single Exclusiva, a collaboration with Farruko under the production of Los de la Nazza, later released the Remix version with Chris Wandell, Rauw Alejandro and Brray.

The following year he began to gain popularity by collaborating on tracks by other singers such as Myke Towers, Rafa Pabón and Lunay, with the latter he collaborated on the single "A Solas", while with Ozuna, Rauw Alejandro y Lunay he collaborated on the topic "Luz Apaga" which was ranked 26th on the Hot Latin Songs chart.

In 2019 he premiered his third EP, but this time without obscene content that was called Episodios, with the production of the record label Rimas Music. At the end of that same year, he was nominated for the Youth Awards in the category of "New Urban Generation".

On February 14, 2020, he released the remix of the song "En tu cuerpo" together with his countrymen Rauw Alejandro, Lenny Tavárez and the Argentine singer María Becerra. "En tu cuerpo" ranked number 16 on the Billboard Hot 100 list of Argentine artists and ended up being certified Platinum (Latin) by Recording Industry Association of America (RIAA) in 2021. In April he collaborated with Piso 21 and Jerry Di on the hit "Luna llena" which reached more than 12 million views on YouTube and 4 million streams in Spotify, it was also a trend in Spain on that platform for four consecutive weeks, even reaching the number 1 position in Colombia.

== Discography ==
=== Studio albums ===
- Para Todas las Mamacitas (2024)

=== EPs ===
- S.O.D.A (2016)
- AM (2017)
- Episodios (2019)
- Foreplay (2020)
- Pa' la Calle (2021)
- El Cambio (2022)
- Midnight (2023)

== Awards and nominations ==
Premios Juventud

Year	Nomined	Category	Result	Ref.
2019	Lyanno	New Urban Generation	Nominated	

Premios Tu Música Urbano

Year	Nomined	Category	Result	Ref.
2019	Lyanno	New Urban Artist – Puerto Rico	Nominated	
2019	"A Solas" (ft. Lunay) and Toda (Remix)	Song Of The Year – Puerto Rico	Nominated	
2019	Toda (Remix) and A Solas (Remix)	Remix Of The Year - International	Nominated	
2020	Episodio	Álbum New Generation	Nominated	
2020	Top Urbano Puerto Rico	Lyanno	Nominated	
