= Rauw Alejandro =

Puerto Rican singer (born 1993)

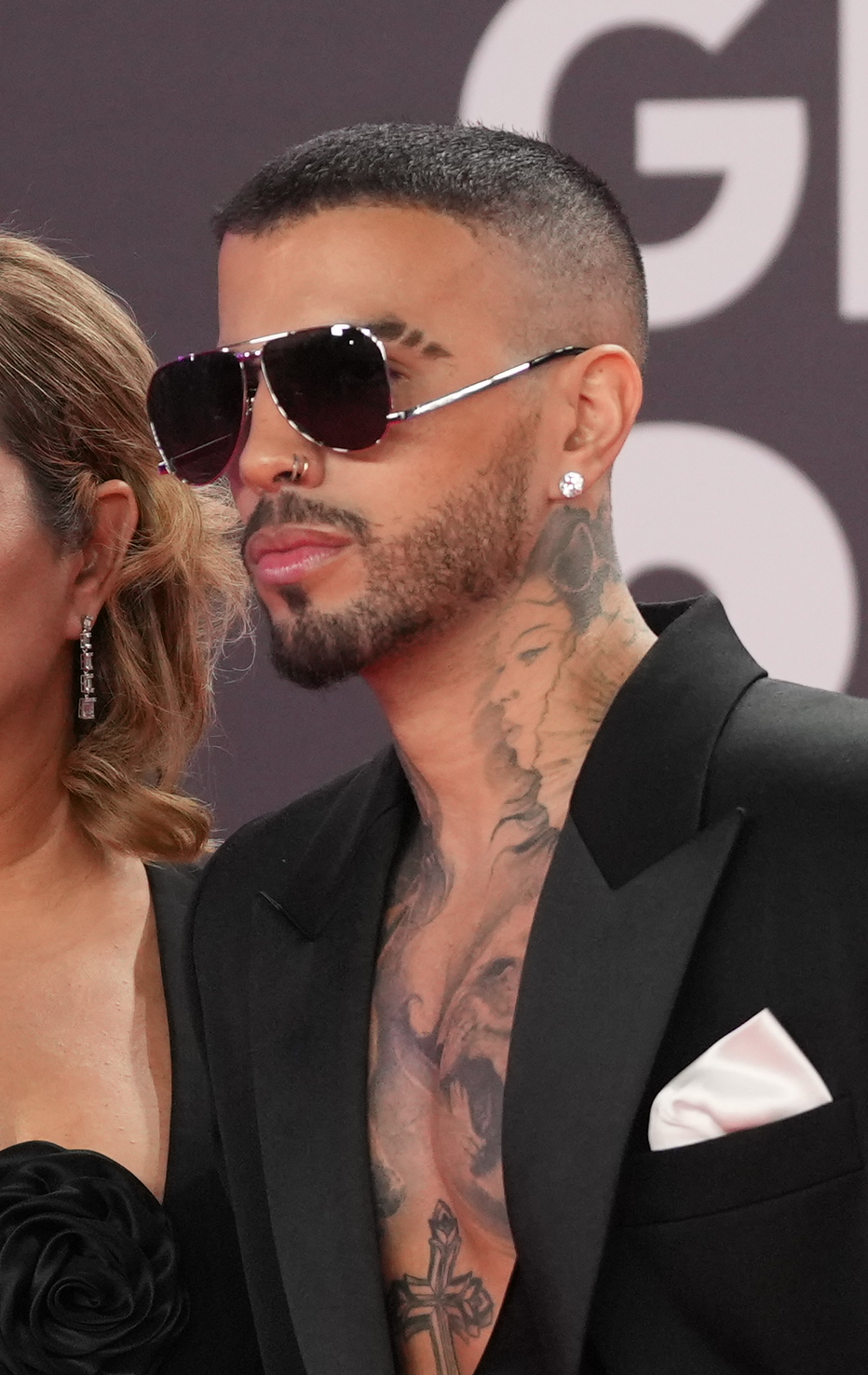
- Alejandro at the 2023 Latin Grammy Awards
- Born: Raúl Alejandro Ocasio Ruiz; January 10, 1993 (age 33); San Juan, Puerto Rico
- Other names: El Zorro; Rauleeto
- Occupations: Singer; songwriter
- Years active: 2014–present
- Works: Discography
- Awards: Full list
- Musical career
- Genres: Reggaeton; Latin R&B; Pop; urbano; Latin trap; Dance
- Instrument: Vocals
- Labels: Duars; Sony Latin
- Website: rauwalejandro.com (in Spanish and English)

Raúl Alejandro Ocasio Ruiz (born January 10, 1993), known professionally as Rauw Alejandro, is a Puerto Rican singer and songwriter. His music style spans reggaeton, Latin R&B, urbano, Latin trap, rhythmic pop, and ballads. His accolades include two Latin Grammy Awards, two Billboard Latin Music Awards, and an iHeartRadio Music Awards. Rolling Stone called him "the greatest showman in Latin music" and compared his concerts to a Broadway production.

Alejandro began his career on SoundCloud in 2014 and he released his first mixtape Punto de Equilibrio in 2016. In January 2017 Alejandro signed a record deal with Duars Entertainment. Later that year he released the single "Toda" with Alex Rose, which gained him fame in the Latin music scene. His debut EP Trap Cake, Vol. 1 released in 2019. Following the release of hit singles including "Fantasías", Rauw Alejandro's debut studio album Afrodisíaco released in 2020, and was nominated for Best Música Urbana Album at the 64th Annual Grammy Awards. The album was followed by Vice Versa the following year. In 2022 he collaborated with Shakira on the hit single "Te Felicito". That November his second album Saturno released, supported by the single "Lokera", among others.

In 2023, Rauw Alejandro collaborated with his at-the-time girlfriend Rosalía on the EP RR. A few months later it was followed by his third album Playa Saturno, which included the single "Baby Hello" with Bizarrap. Rauw Alejandro's fifth album Cosa Nuestra released in 2024, and included the singles "Qué Pasaría..." with Bad Bunny and "Khé?" with Romeo Santos. This was followed by Cosa Nuestra: Capítulo 0 (2025).

== Early life ==
Raúl Alejandro Ocasio Ruiz was born on January 10, 1993, in San Juan, Puerto Rico, and was raised in Canóvanas and Carolina. His father, guitarist Raúl Ocasio, his brother, Pedro Ocasio Ruiz and his mother, backing vocalist María Nelly Ruiz, introduced him to some of his musical influences like Elvis Presley, Michael Jackson, and Rihanna. Raul's father was born and raised in Brooklyn, New York City, and later moved to Puerto Rico. Additionally, Rauw has mentioned a personal connection to his Italian heritage, as his great-grandfather was from Palermo, Sicily.

For many years, Alejandro and his father lived in the mainland United States, mainly Miami and New York City, where he got inspiration from the R&B and dancehall genres. Alejandro and fellow Puerto Rican rapper Anuel AA are childhood friends; they both went to the same school and had classes together.

As a child, Alejandro competed in school talent shows due to his passion for dancing. After graduating high school, he enrolled at University of Puerto Rico. From the age of six until he was twenty, he played soccer, but later quit because he "could not perform as he expected to" after suffering an injury. He moved to Orlando, Florida, intending to be scouted to play in the Premier Development League (PDL), but ultimately was unsuccessful.

== Career ==
=== 2014–2019: Career beginnings, rise to popularity ===
After quitting soccer, he was left in a light depression, so, to improve his mood, he decided to switch to a music career and begin publishing songs through SoundCloud in 2014. In November 2016, he released his debut mixtape titled Punto de Equilibrio. In January 2017, he signed a music deal with Duars Entertainment.

In December 2017, he released his first single as lead artist, titled "Toda", with Alex Rose. It peaked at #29 on the Billboard Hot Latin Songs charts in November 2018. In that same year he was chosen by Sony Music Latin to be part of "Los Próximos", a musical project in which the label sought to enlist new musical talents. The musical project helped him gain fame, and, as a result, other noteworthy artists began to hear his music. Alejandro was then featured in multiple collaborations, including Kevin Roldán and Khea's "Pa' Tu Casa" and "Luz Apagá" with Ozuna, Lunay and Lyanno, that year. A subsequent remix of the "Toda", featuring Argentine artist Cazzu and fellow Puerto Ricans Lenny Tavárez and Lyanno, was released in May 2018. The remix proved successful, with the music video having over 1 billion views on YouTube as of November 2020.

In January 2019, he released his single "Que le dé" with Nicky Jam. In December 2019, his song "Fantasías", with Farruko, peaked at the #12 spot on the US Hot Latin Songs chart; he also recorded a hugely popular remix (and accompanying music video) to the single, featuring additional verses by Anuel AA, Lunay, and Dominican singer Natti Natasha. "Fantasías", at the time, charted at the highest position of any of his songs on the US charts, along with the song "Tattoo". Both songs stayed for around 20 weeks on the charts, eventually winning the Latin Grammy Award for Best Urban Fusion/Performance in 2021. The remix video for "Fantasías" has received over 425 million views on YouTube.

=== 2020–2021: Afrodisíaco and Vice Versa ===
On September 4, 2020, Alejandro was featured on the remix and in the music video to the Lyanno song "En Tu Cuerpo", the two once again collaborating with Lenny Tavárez, and also featuring new Argentine singer María Becerra, just 20 years old at the time (in 2020). The music video has over 386 million views on YouTube. Later that year, his debut album, Afrodisíaco, was released, preceded by the release of three singles and music videos: "Enchule", the "Elegí" remix, and "Reloj" (with Anuel AA).

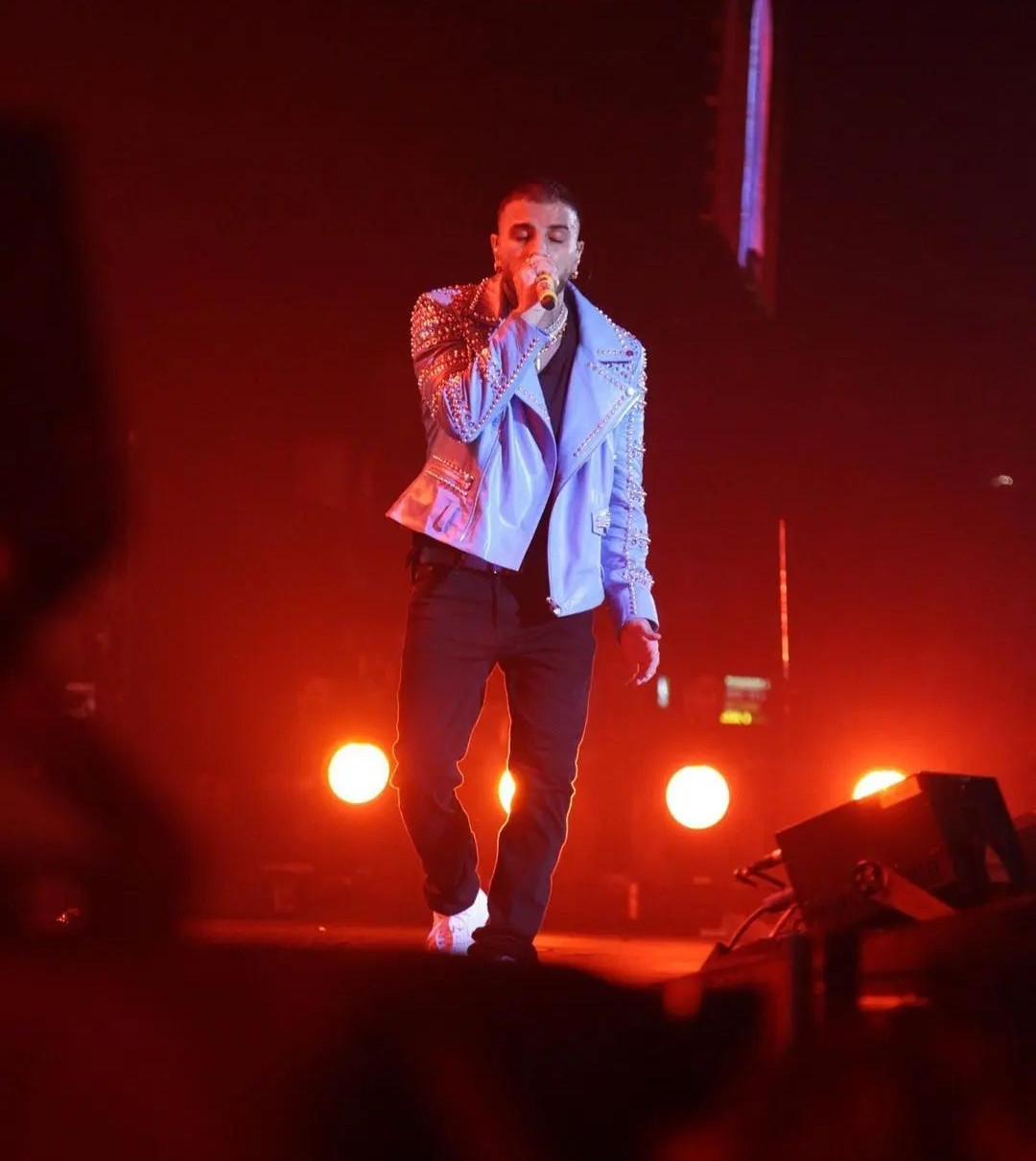
Alejandro performing in 2022

On May 20, 2021, he released "Todo de Ti", which peaked at the number 2 spot on Spotify's Top Songs Global chart. On June 25, 2021, he released his sophomore album, Vice Versa, through Sony Music Latin and Duars Entertainment. Afrodisíaco earned him a nomination for Best Música Urbana Album at the 64th Annual Grammy Awards.

In July 2021, Alejandro was featured on the Jennifer Lopez song "Cambia el Paso" and appeared in its accompanying music video, shot in Miami.

In July 2021, he embarked on his Rauw Alejandro World Tour which lasted until December of that year.

=== 2022–2024: Saturno, Playa Saturno, and Cosa Nuestra ===
In April 2022, Alejandro featured on Colombian artist Shakira's single "Te Felicito" and in its accompanying music video. The song proved to be among his most successful, reaching the #1 position (or within the top five) across Latin America and Spain (#2), as well as charting in several non-Spanish-speaking countries, including Brazil (#10), Croatia, France, Portugal, Switzerland, and Ukraine. The single would also reach #3 in Russia. "Te Felicito" reached #1 on the Billboard US Latin Airplay, Latin Pop Airplay and Latin Rhythm Airplay charts, and #10 on the Billboard Hot Latin Songs chart. The single's official music video has received over 606 million views on YouTube.

On November 15, 2024, Rauw Alejandro released his album titled Cosa Nuestra through Sony Music Latin and Duars Entertainment. The album features 18 tracks and has a total runtime of 1 hour and 7 minutes. It includes collaboration with artists such as Laura Pausini, Romeo Santos, and Bad Bunny, blending elements such as salsa, reggaeton and other genres. As for the release of the album, he went for a mafia concept for this specific album. The release marked Alejandro's first album of 2024, following the earlier release of the single "Pasaporte" which was also included as part of the Cosa Nuestra album as track #14.

=== 2024-present: Cosa Nuestra: Capítulo 0 ===
On September 26, 2025, he released his 6th studio album, Cosa Nuestra: Capítulo 0, a sequel to Cosa Nuestra. The album is an homage to Puerto Rican and Caribbean origins and ancestral culture, featuring many different sounds including bomba, salsa, bachata, reggaeton, plena, afrobeats, and more. The album also includes notable features such as De La Rose, Mon Laferte, Rvssian, Ayra Starr, Wisin, Ñengo Flow, and Jey One. A notable song featured in the album is Carita Linda, a neo-bomba hit, blending modern beats with Afro-Caribbean sounds. The song was first released as a single and, "reached No. 1 spot on Latin Airplay and Latin Pop Airplay charts." The release of the album also included Rauw Alejandro's first bachata song, SILENCIO, in collaboration with bachata artist, Romeo Santos. The song, Guabansexxx, draws heavy inspiration from the Taíno deity of weather and storms, Guabancex, in which lyrics and sounds allude to the destruction and chaos of a heavy storm.

During his Cosa Nuestra World Tour stop in Brooklyn, New York, Rolling Stone called him "the greatest showman in Latin music" and compared his concerts to a Broadway production. Rauw Alejandro performed a medley of his songs at the 26th Annual Latin Grammy Awards. A month later, he gave a free concert in Santo Domingo, Dominican Republic. The concert took place at the Parque Eugenio María de Hostos. The show was dubbed Noche Caribeña and held over 40,000 attendees.

== Artistry ==
Alejandro's music styles include such genres as reggaeton, Latin R&B, urbano, Latin trap, rhythmic pop, and ballads. Billboard commented that this versatility has helped "set him apart from a growing class of pop-leaning reggaetoneros". He has cited Chris Brown, Michael Jackson, Ricky Martin, Daddy Yankee, Elvis Presley, Bruno Mars and Ciara as a few of his musical inspirations. In addition, Alejandro has also noted Rihanna as one of his dream collaborations.

== Awards and nominations ==
Rauw is a two-time Latin Grammy winner: He took home the trophy for Best Urban Fusion/Performance for "Tattoo Remix" with Camilo in 2021, and his work with Rosalía's Motomami earned him a win for Album of the Year in 2022.

== Personal life ==
By the end of 2019, Alejandro was in a relationship with Spanish singer Rosalía which he made public in September 2021. They announced their engagement in March 2023, but called it off in July 2023.

On 20 August 2026, journalist Álex Rodríguez reported that a few weeks earlier, Alejandro had a child with a university student from Puerto Rico who lives with him in New York and with whom he had been in a relationship with since shortly after his breakup with Rosalía.

== Discography ==
- Afrodisíaco (2020)
- Vice Versa (2021)
- Saturno (2022)
- Playa Saturno (2023)
- Cosa Nuestra (2024)
- Cosa Nuestra: Capítulo 0 (2025)

== Filmography ==
- La Reina del flow (2022)
- Sky Rojo (2023)
- La firma (2023)
- Viva La Madness (TBA)

== Tours ==
- Fantasías Tour (2020)
- Rauw Alejandro World Tour (2021)
- Vice Versa Tour (2022)
- Saturno World Tour (2023)
- Cosa Nuestra World Tour (2025)
