= Saturno World Tour =

2023 concert tour by Rauw Alejandro

- Tour by Rauw Alejandro
- Location: North America; Europe
- Associated album: Saturno; Playa Saturno
- Start date: 18 February 2023
- End date: 29 September 2023
- Legs: 2
- No. of shows: 47
- Producer: Duars Entertainment

Rauw Alejandro concert chronology
- Vice Versa Tour (2022); Saturno World Tour (2023); Cosa Nuestra World Tour (2025)

The Saturno World Tour was the fourth concert tour by Puerto Rican singer Rauw Alejandro in support of his third studio album Saturno (2022) and its counterpart Playa Saturno (2023). It began on 18 February 2023 in Santo Domingo, Dominican Republic, and ended on 29 September 2023 in Rome, Italy, comprising 47 shows.

The Saturno tour was originally scheduled to travel Central and South America in the falltime, but was canceled after many logistical, technical and production problems in Europe led to the cancellation of almost half of the European leg.

== Shows ==
List of concerts, showing date, city, country, venue, opening acts, tickets sold, number of available tickets and amount of gross revenue
Date	City	Country	Venue	Opening acts
18 February 2023	Santo Domingo	Dominican Republic	Estadio Quisqueya	Jabbawockeez
4 March 2023	Tampa	United States	Amalie Arena	Jabbawockeez
6 March 2023	Duluth	United States	Gas South Arena	Jabbawockeez
8 March 2023	Orlando	United States	Amway Center	Jabbawockeez
11 March 2023	Miami	United States	Miami-Dade Arena	Jabbawockeez
12 March 2023	Miami	United States	Miami-Dade Arena	Jabbawockeez
15 March 2023	Reading	United States	Santander Arena	Jabbawockeez
16 March 2023	Boston	United States	TD Garden	Jabbawockeez
18 March 2023	Charlotte	United States	Spectrum Center	Jabbawockeez
19 March 2023	Washington, D.C.	United States	Capital One Arena	Jabbawockeez
21 March 2023	Toronto	Canada	Scotiabank Arena	Jabbawockeez
23 March 2023	Newark	United States	Prudential Center	Jabbawockeez
24 March 2023	Brooklyn	United States	Barclays Center	Jabbawockeez
31 March 2023	San Juan	Puerto Rico	Hiram Bithorn Stadium	Jabbawockeez
1 April 2023	San Juan	Puerto Rico	Hiram Bithorn Stadium	Jabbawockeez
5 April 2023	Rosemont	United States	Allstate Arena	Jabbawockeez
7 April 2023	Denver	United States	Ball Arena	Jabbawockeez
12 April 2023	Edinburg	United States	Bert Ogden Arena	Jabbawockeez
14 April 2023	Houston	United States	Toyota Center	Jabbawockeez
16 April 2023	Austin	United States	Moody Center	Jabbawockeez
20 April 2023	Fort Worth	United States	Dickies Arena	Jabbawockeez
22 April 2023	El Paso	United States	Don Haskins Center	Jabbawockeez
23 April 2023	Glendale	United States	Desert Diamond Arena	Jabbawockeez
25 April 2023	Sacramento	United States	Golden 1 Center	Jabbawockeez
26 April 2023	San Jose	United States	SAP Center	Jabbawockeez
28 April 2023	Inglewood	United States	Kia Forum	Jabbawockeez
29 April 2023	Inglewood	United States	Kia Forum	Jabbawockeez
1 May 2023	San Diego	United States	Pechanga Arena	Jabbawockeez
5 May 2023	Portland	United States	Moda Center	Jabbawockeez
6 May 2023	Seattle	United States	Climate Pledge Arena	Jabbawockeez
20 May 2023	Mexico City	Mexico	Foro Sol	Jabbawockeez
24 May 2023	Cancún	Mexico	Estadio Olímpico Andrés Quintana Roo	Jabbawockeez
26 May 2023	Veracruz	Mexico	Estadio de Béisbol Beto Ávila	Jabbawockeez
1 June 2023	Monterrey	Mexico	Estadio Mobil Super	Jabbawockeez
3 June 2023	Guadalajara	Mexico	Estadio Tres de Marzo	Jabbawockeez
8 June 2023	Hermosillo	Mexico	Estadio Héroe de Nacozari	Jabbawockeez
10 June 2023	Tijuana	Mexico	Estadio Caliente	Jabbawockeez
26 August 2023	Valencia	Spain	City of Arts and Sciences	Jabbawockeez
1 September 2023	Barcelona	Spain	Palau Sant Jordi	Jabbawockeez
2 September 2023	Barakaldo	Spain	Bizkaia Arena	Jabbawockeez
9 September 2023	Seville	Spain	Estadio de La Cartuja	Jabbawockeez
10 September 2023	Madrid	Spain	WiZink Center	Jabbawockeez
15 September 2023	Murcia	Spain	Estadio Nueva Condomina	Jabbawockeez
17 September 2023	Milan	Italy	Carroponte	Jabbawockeez
21 September 2023	Paris	France	Accor Arena	Jabbawockeez
25 September 2023	Rotterdam	Netherlands	RTM Stage	Jabbawockeez
29 September 2023	Rome	Italy	Cinecittà World	Jabbawockeez

== Cancelled shows ==
List of cancelled concerts, showing date, city, country, venue and reason for cancellation
Date	City	Country	Venue	Reason
2 May 2023	Thousand Palms	United States	Acrisure Arena	Groin injury
27 May 2023	Querétaro City	Mexico	Estadio Olímpico Alameda	Logistic conflict
27 August 2023	Palma	Spain	Son Fusteret	Heavy rain. Imposibility to travel from Valencia.
16 September 2023	Adeje	Spain	Golf Costa Adeje	Technical impossibilities
23 September 2023	Gdańsk	Poland	Ergo Arena	Low tickets sales
24 September 2023	Antwerp	Belgium	Sportpaleis	Low tickets sales
28 September 2023	Bucharest	Romania	Romexpo	Low tickets sales
30 September 2023	Zurich	Switzerland	Hallenstadion	Low tickets sales
1 October 2023 (Note: The 1 October 2023 in London was originally planned to take place at The O2 Arena.)	London	England	Wembley Arena	Low tickets sales
2 October 2023	Düsseldorf	Germany	PSD Bank Dome	Low tickets sales
3 October 2023	Munich	Germany	Olympiahalle	Low tickets sales
7 October 2023	San José	Costa Rica	Estadio Nacional	Low tickets sales
11 October 2023	Managua	Nicaragua	Estadio de Fútbol	Low tickets sales
13 October 2023	Guatemala City	Guatemala	Cayala	Low tickets sales
14 October 2023	San Salvador	El Salvador	Estadio Cuscatlán	Low tickets sales
19 October 2023	Medellín	Colombia	Estadio Atanasio Girardot	Low tickets sales
21 October 2023	Bogotá	Colombia	Movistar Arena	Low tickets sales
25 October 2023	Panama City	Panama	Plaza Figali	Low tickets sales
26 October 2023	Tegucigalpa	Honduras	Estadio Chochi Sosa	Low tickets sales
28 October 2023	Lima	Peru	Estadio Universidad San Marcos	Low tickets sales
31 October 2023	Santiago	Chile	Hipódromo Chile	Low tickets sales
2 November 2023	São Paulo	Brazil	Vibra São Paulo	Low tickets sales
9 November 2023	Buenos Aires	Argentina	Movistar Arena	Low tickets sales
