= Rauw Alejandro discography =

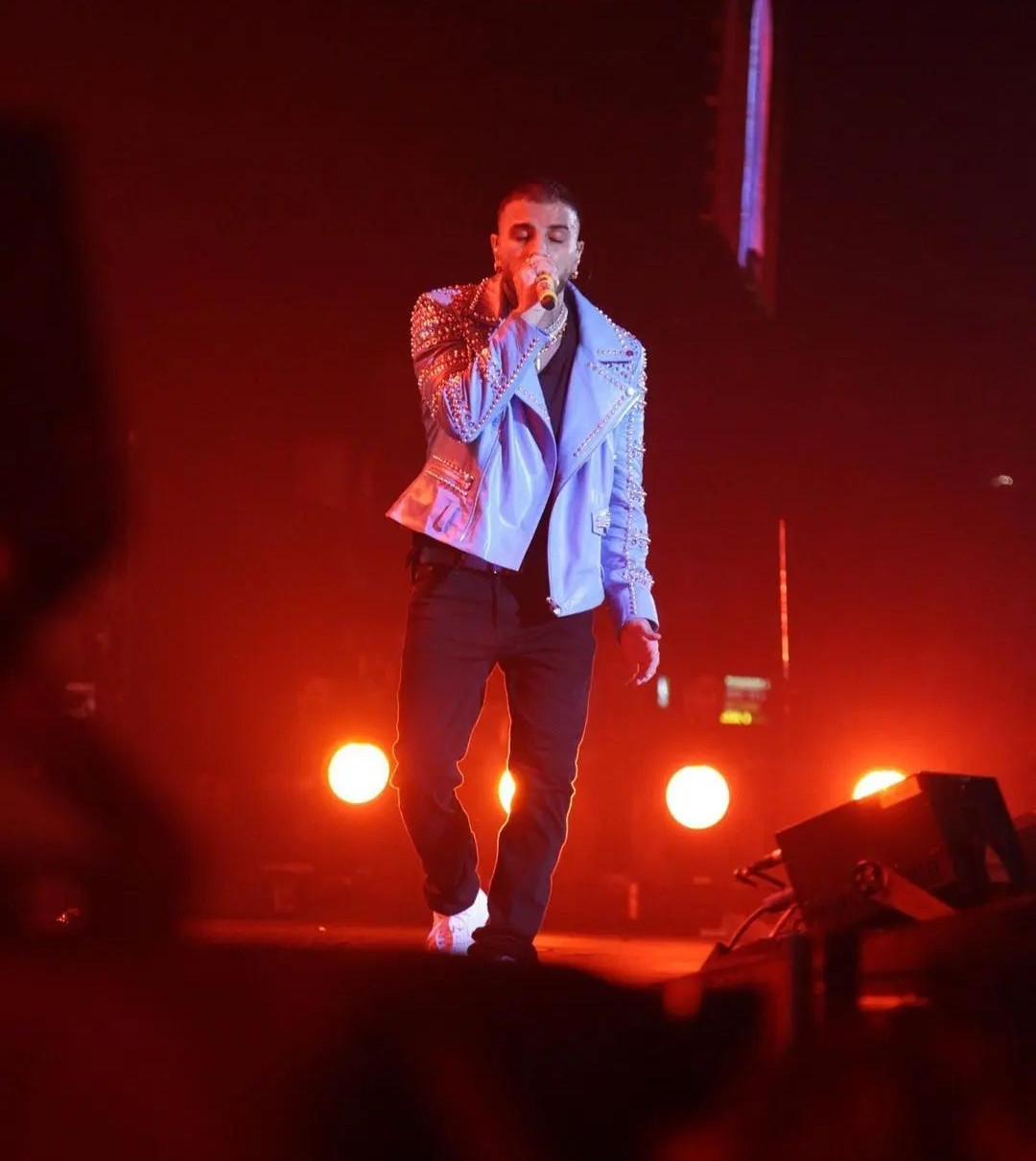
- Rauw Alejandro in 2022
- Studio albums: 6
- EPs: 3
- Live albums: 1
- Singles: 61

Puerto Rican singer Rauw Alejandro has released six studio albums, one live album and three extended plays (EP). He also released 61 singles, including 26 promotional singles and 19 as featured artist. He was the top new Latin artist of 2021 and the second top Latin artist of the year overall, according to Billboard.

His debut EP, Trap Cake, Vol. 1 was released in 2019, and his debut studio album, Afrodisíaco was released the following year. Afrodisíaco peaked at number three on the US Billboard Top Latin Albums chart and has been nominated for a Grammy award. The album spawned hit singles "Reloj" and "Tattoo" (remix). Both songs reached the top 10 on the US Billboard Hot Latin Songs. Alejandro's second studio album, Vice Versa was released in June 2021. The album topped the Billboard Top Latin Albums chart and featured his biggest hit "Todo de Ti", as well as "2/Catorce", "Cúrame", and "Desesperados". His second extended play, Trap Cake, Vol. 2, was released on February 25, 2022. Alejandro released his third studio album, Saturno in November 2022, which features "Lokera" and "Punto 40".

Besides material for his albums, Alejandro has recorded several collaborations and non-album singles, including "Toda" (remix), "Fantasías", "La Nota", "Baila Conmigo", and "Nostálgico".

== Albums ==
=== Studio albums ===
List of studio albums with selected details
Title	Details	Peak chart positions							Certifications
Title	Details	US	US Latin	CAN	ITA	POR	SPA	SWI	Certifications
Afrodisíaco	Released: November 13, 2020; Labels: Sony Latin, Duars Entertainment; Format: CD, digital download, streaming	75	3	—	—	—	2	—	RIAA: 11× Platinum (Latin); AMPROFON: 3× Platinum; PROMUSICAE: Platinum
Vice Versa	Released: June 25, 2021; Labels: Sony Latin, Duars Entertainment; Format: Digital download, streaming	17	1	—	59	71	1	—	RIAA: 17× Platinum (Latin); AMPROFON: Diamond+Gold; FIMI: Platinum; PROMUSICAE: 2× Platinum
Saturno	Released: November 11, 2022; Labels: Sony Latin, Duars Entertainment; Format: CD, digital download, streaming	25	2	—	—	—	2	—	RIAA: 7× Platinum (Latin); AMPROFON: Platinum+Gold; PROMUSICAE: Platinum
Playa Saturno	Released: July 7, 2023; Labels: Sony Latin, Duars Entertainment; Format: Digital download, streaming	29	4	—	—	—	4	—	RIAA: 2× Platinum (Latin); AMPROFON: Platinum; PROMUSICAE: Gold
Cosa Nuestra	Released: November 15, 2024; Labels: Sony Latin, Duars Entertainment; Format: CD, LP, digital download, streaming	6	1	64	30	47	1	10	RIAA: 6× Platinum (Latin); AMPROFON: 3× Platinum; FIMI: Gold; PROMUSICAE: Platinum
Cosa Nuestra: Capítulo 0	Released: September 26, 2025; Labels: Sony Latin; Format: CD, LP, digital download, streaming	24	3	—	—	69	5	25	
"—" denotes a recording that did not chart or was not released in that territory.

=== Live albums ===
List of live albums with selected details
Title	Details	Peaks
Title	Details	US Latin
Concierto Virtual en Tiempos de COVID-19 Desde el Coliseo de Puerto Rico	Released: May 29, 2020; Labels: Sony Music Latin, Duars Entertainment; Format: Digital download, streaming	10

== EPs ==
List of EPS with selected details
Title	Details	Peaks		Certifications
Title	Details	US Latin	SPA	Certifications
Trap Cake, Vol. 1	Released: May 31, 2019; Labels: Sony Latin, Duars Entertainment; Format: Digital download, streaming	—	—	
Trap Cake, Vol. 2	Released: February 25, 2022; Labels: Sony Latin, Duars Entertainment; Format: Digital download, streaming	6	9	AMPROFON: Platinum
RR (with Rosalía)	Release date: March 24, 2023; Label: Columbia, Duars, Sony Latin; Format: LP, digital download, streaming	—	—	
"—" denotes a recording that did not chart or was not released in that territory.

== Mixtapes ==
List of mixtapes, with selected details
Title	Details
Punto de Equilibrio	Released: November 30, 2016; Labels: Under Music Group; Format: CD, digital download, streaming

== Singles ==
=== As lead artist ===
List of singles as lead artist, with selected chart positions and certifications, showing year released
Title	Year	Peak chart positions										Certifications	Album
Title	Year	PRI	ARG	FRA	ITA	MEX	POR	SPA	SWI	US	US Latin	Certifications	Album
"La Oportunidad"	2017	—	—	—	—	—	—	—	—	—	—		Non-album singles
"Toda" (with Alex Rose, or remix with Alex Rose and Cazzu featuring Lenny Tavárez and Lyanno)	2017	—	12	—	—	—	—	45	—	—	29	RIAA: 22× Platinum (Latin); PROMUSICAE: Gold	Non-album singles
"T.T.I."	2018	—	—	—	—	—	—	—	—	—	—		Non-album singles
"¿Qué Somos?" (with Lyanno and Mathew)	2018	—	—	—	—	—	—	—	—	—	—		Non-album singles
"Que Le Dé" (with Nicky Jam or remix with Nicky Jam, Brytiago, Justin Quiles and Myke Towers)	2019	—	77	—	—	—	—	77	—	—	42	RIAA: 2× Platinum (Latin); AMPROFON: 2× Platinum	Non-album singles
"Mírame" (with Nio Garcia and Lenny Tavárez and remix featuring Myke Towers, Casper Magico and Darell)	2019	—	43	—	—	—	—	80	—	—	31	RIAA: Platinum (Latin); RIAA: 4× Platinum (Latin) (remix)	Now or Never
"El Efecto" (with Chencho Corleone or remix with Chencho Corleone and Kevvo featuring Lyanno, Bryant Myers, and Dalex)	2019	15	10	—	22	—	—	32	—	—	—	RIAA: 9× Platinum (Latin); AMPROFON: 4× Platinum+Gold; FIMI: Platinum; PROMUSICAE: 2× Platinum	Non-album singles
"Detective"	2019	—	96	—	—	—	—	—	—	—	—		Non-album singles
"Fantasías" (with Farruko or remix with Anuel AA and Natti Natasha featuring Farruko and Lunay)	2019	—	2	—	—	—	—	4	—	— (Note: "Fantasías" did not enter the Billboard Hot 100, but peaked at number 11 on the Bubbling Under Hot 100 Singles chart.)	12	RIAA: 19× Platinum (Latin); AMPROFON: Diamond+2× Platinum; FIMI: Gold; PROMUSICAE: 3× Platinum	Non-album singles
"Una Noche" (with Wisin)	2019	—	—	—	—	—	—	—	—	—	—		Non-album singles
"Dream Girl (Remix)" (with Ir-Sais)	2019	—	15	—	—	—	—	—	—	—	25	RIAA: Diamond (Latin); AMPROFON: 2× Platinum+Gold	Non-album singles
"Tattoo" (solo or remix with Camilo)	2020	1	1^{1}	—	—	— (Note: "Tattoo (remix)" did not enter the Mexico Airplay chart, but peaked at number 12 on the Mexico Pop Espanol Airplay chart.)	—	2	—	— (Note: "Tattoo (remix)" did not enter the Billboard Hot 100, but peaked at number six on the Bubbling Under Hot 100 Singles chart.)	7^{1}	AMPROFON: Diamond+Platinum+Gold; PROMUSICAE: 5× Platinum	Afrodisiaco
"TBT" (with Sebastián Yatra and Manuel Turizo or remix with Sebastián Yatra and Manuel Turizo featuring Cosculluela, Lalo Ebratt, Llane and Dalmata)	2020	1	29	—	—	— (Note: "TBT" did not enter the Mexico Airplay chart, but peaked at number 13 on the Mexico Pop Espanol Airplay chart.)	—	39	—	—	16	RIAA: 3× Platinum (Latin); PROMUSICAE: Platinum	Dharma
"Elegí" (with Dalex and Lenny Tavárez featuring Dímelo Flow or remix with Dalex and Lenny Tavárez featuring Farruko, Anuel AA, Sech, Dímelo Flow, and Justin Quiles)	2020	—	4	—	—	—	—	26	—	—	—	RIAA: Platinum (Latin); AMPROFON: Diamond+3× Platinum+Gold; PROMUSICAE: Gold	Afrodisiaco
"En Tu Cuerpo (Remix)" (with Lyanno and Lenny Tavárez featuring María Becerra)	2020	—	16	—	—	—	—	—	—	—	—		El Cambio
"Enchule"	2020	—	66	—	—	—	—	10	—	—	—	AMPROFON: Platinum; PROMUSICAE: Platinum	Afrodisiaco
"La Nota" (with Manuel Turizo and Myke Towers)	2020	2	25	—	—	1	176	1	—	— (Note: "La Nota" did not enter the Billboard Hot 100, but peaked at number seven on the Bubbling Under Hot 100 Singles chart.)	5	AMPROFON: 2× Platinum+Gold; PROMUSICAE: 4× Platinum	Dopamina
"Reloj" (with Anuel AA)	2020	15	11	—	—	—	—	11	—	— (Note: "Reloj" did not enter the Billboard Hot 100, but peaked at number 25 on the Bubbling Under Hot 100 Singles chart.)	10	AMPROFON: 2× Diamond; PROMUSICAE: 2× Platinum	Afrodisiaco
"De Cora <3" (with J Balvin)	2020	9	48	—	—	5	—	18	—	—	16	PROMUSICAE: Platinum	Afrodisiaco
"Baila Conmigo" (with Selena Gomez)	2021	3	8	187	—	— (Note: "Baila Conmigo" did not enter the Mexico Airplay chart, but peaked at number 19 on the Mexico Pop Espanol Airplay chart.)	52	7	28	74	4	PROMUSICAE: 2× Platinum	Revelación
"Dile a Él"	2021	—	49	—	—	—	—	59	—	—	38	AMPROFON: Platinum+Gold; PROMUSICAE: Platinum	Afrodisiaco
"2/Catorce" (with Mr. Nasgai)	2021	—	12	—	—	—	—	12	—	— (Note: "2/Catorce" did not enter the Billboard Hot 100, but peaked at number 23 on the Bubbling Under Hot 100 chart.)	11	AMPROFON: 2× Platinum; CAPIF: Gold; PROMUSICAE: 2× Platinum	Vice Versa
"Vacío" (with Luis Fonsi)	2021	1	36	—	—	22	—	41	—	—	23	PROMUSICAE: Gold	Ley de gravedad
"Aloha" (DJ Luian and Mambo Kingz featuring Maluma, Rauw Alejandro, Beéle and Darell)	2021	—	—	—	—	—	—	11	—	—	49	PROMUSICAE : 2× Platinum	Non-album singles
"Tiroteo (Remix)" (with Marc Seguí and Pol Granch)	2021	—	12	—	—	39	—	4	—	—	—	RIAA: Platinum (Latin); AMPROFON: 4× Platinum; PROMUSICAE: 7× Platinum	Non-album singles
"Todo de Ti"	2021	1	1	74	42	2	23	1	44	32	2	RIAA: 6× Platinum (Latin); AFP: Platinum; AMPROFON: 2× Diamond+Platinum; CAPIF: Platinum; FIMI: Platinum; IFPI SWI: Gold; PROMUSICAE: 10× Platinum	Vice Versa
"Sexo Virtual"	2021	—	96	—	—	—	—	19	—	—	20	AMPROFON: 2× Platinum+Gold; PROMUSICAE: Platinum	Vice Versa
"Cambia el Paso" (with Jennifer Lopez)	2021	6	—	—	—	—	—	98	—	—	21		Non-album single
"Cúrame"	2021	9	15	—	—	31	—	3	—	—	18	AMPROFON: Gold; PROMUSICAE: 7× Platinum	Vice Versa
"Nostálgico" (with Rvssian and Chris Brown)	2021	4	49	—	—	—	159	3	69	— (Note: "Nostálgico" did not enter the Billboard Hot 100, but peaked at number 23 on the Bubbling Under Hot 100 Singles chart.)	11	RIAA: 5× Platinum (Latin); AMPROFON: Gold; PROMUSICAE: 2× Platinum	Non-album single
"Problemón" (with Álvaro Díaz)	2021	—	79	—	—	—	—	85	—	—	46	RIAA: Platinum (Latin)	Felicilandia
"Desesperados" (with Chencho Corleone)	2021	—	4	—	—	19	81	1	97	91	5	RIAA: 4× Platinum (Latin); AMPROFON: Diamond+2× Platinum+Gold; PROMUSICAE: 2× Platinum	Vice Versa
"Caprichoso"	2022	—	—	—	—	—	—	22	—	—	—		Trap Cake, Vol. 2
"Gracias por Nada"	2022	—	—	—	—	—	—	84	—	—	39		Trap Cake, Vol. 2
"Te Felicito" (with Shakira)	2022	2	1	53	—	5	—	3	71	67	10	RIAA: 13× Platinum (Latin); AMPROFON: 4× Platinum; FIMI: Gold; IFPI SWI: Gold; PROMUSICAE: 6× Platinum	Las Mujeres Ya No Lloran
"Lokera" (with Lyanno and Brray)	2022	—	74	—	—	—	—	13	—	99	11	RIAA: 22× Platinum (Latin); AMPROFON: 3× Platinum; PROMUSICAE: 2× Platinum	Saturno
"Party" (with Bad Bunny)	2022	—	33	—	—	3	151	7	—	14	4	PROMUSICAE: Platinum	Un Verano Sin Ti
"Punto 40" (with Baby Rasta)	2022	—	33	—	—	—	—	5	—	— (Note: "Punto 40" did not enter the Billboard Hot 100, but peaked at number one on the Bubbling Under Hot 100 Singles chart.)	11	RIAA: 14× Platinum (Latin); AMPROFON: Platinum+Gold; PROMUSICAE: 2× Platinum	Saturno
"Lejos del Cielo"	2022	—	—	—	—	—	—	26	—	—	15		Saturno
"De Carolina" (with DJ Playero)	2022	—	—	—	—	—	—	91	—	—	—		Saturno
"Panties y Brasieres" (with Daddy Yankee)	2023	11	—	—	—	—	—	24	—	—	24	RIAA: 4× Platinum (Latin); PROMUSICAE: Platinum	Saturno
"Tamo en Nota" (with Ángel Dior)	2023	—	—	—	—	—	—	20	—	—	—	PROMUSICAE: Gold	Non-album single
"Beso" (with Rosalía)	2023	14	11	7	23	20	—	1	3	52	4	RIAA: Platinum; AMPROFON: 3× Platinum; FIMI: Platinum; IFPI SWI: Gold; PROMUSICAE: 6× Platinum	RR
"Rauw Alejandro: Bzrp Music Sessions, Vol. 56" (with Bizarrap)	2023	—	10	—	—	—	—	1	—	—	36	PROMUSICAE: 2× Platinum	Non-album single
"Baby Hello" (with Bizarrap)	2023	—	29	—	—	—	—	2	—	—	32	RIAA: 3× Platinum (Latin); AMPROFON: Gold; PROMUSICAE: 3× Platinum	Playa Saturno
"Si Te Pegas" (with Miguel Bosé)	2023	—	—	—	—	—	—	49	—	—	—		Playa Saturno
"Diluvio"	2023	—	45	—	—	—	—	3	—	— (Note: "Diluvio" did not enter the Billboard Hot 100, but peaked at number two on the Bubbling Under Hot 100 Singles chart.)	14	RIAA: 2× Platinum (Latin); PROMUSICAE: 3× Platinum	Playa Saturno
"Byak" (with Álvaro Díaz)	2024	—	—	—	—	—	—	51	—	—	—		Non-album singles
"La Nena" (with Lyanno)	2024	—	—	—	—	—	—	25	—	—	41		Non-album singles
"Santa" (Note: "Santa" was first included on Ayra Starr's album The Year I Turned 21.) (with Rvssian and Ayra Starr)	2024	—	11	—	46	—	50	1	—	— (Note: "Santa" did not enter the Billboard Hot 100, but peaked at number 5 on the Bubbling Under Hot 100 Singles chart.)	8	PROMUSICAE: 3× Platinum	Cosa Nuestra: Capítulo 0
"Espectacular" (with Sky Rompiendo)	2024	—	—	—	—	—	—	40	—	—	27		Non-album single
"Touching the Sky"	2024	—	—	—	—	—	—	44	—	—	22	RIAA: Platinum (Latin)	Cosa Nuestra
"Déjame Entrar"	2024	—	—	—	—	—	—	24	—	96	11	RIAA: Platinum (Latin); AMPROFON: Gold	Cosa Nuestra
"Pasaporte" (with Mr. Naisgai)	2024	—	—	—	—	—	—	65	—	—	30		Cosa Nuestra
"Qué Pasaría..." (with Bad Bunny)	2024	19	16	—	—	9	110	1	51	34	2	RIAA: Gold (Latin); AMPROFON: Platinum; PROMUSICAE: Gold	Cosa Nuestra
"Khé?" (with Romeo Santos)	2024	—	24	—	—	12	—	8	—	60	3	AMPROFON: Platinum; PROMUSICAE: Gold	Cosa Nuestra
"Se Fue" (with Laura Pausini)	2024	—	—	—	—	19	—	5	—	82	7	AMPROFON: Gold; PROMUSICAE: Gold	Cosa Nuestra
"Carita Linda"	2025	—	—	—	—	—	—	49	—	—	23		Cosa Nuestra: Capítulo 0
"Forni" (with Los Ballers and Clarent)	2025	—	—	—	—	—	—	53	—	—	47		Non-album single
"Buenos Términos"	2025	—	—	—	—	—	—	59	—	—	18		Cosa Nuestra: Capítulo 0
"GuabanSexxx"	2025	—	—	—	—	—	—	67	—	—	—		Cosa Nuestra: Capítulo 0
"Contrabando" (with Wisin and Ñengo Flow)	2025	—	—	—	—	—	50	—	—	—	—		Cosa Nuestra: Capítulo 0
"Callejón de los Secretos" (with Mon Laferte)	2025	—	—	—	—	—	—	—	—	—	50		Cosa Nuestra: Capítulo 0
"Caribeño" (with Saso)	2025	—	—	—	—	—	—	—	—	—	43		Cosa Nuestra: Capítulo 0
"El Cuc0.0" (with Jey One)	2025	—	—	—	—	—	—	—	—	—	29		Cosa Nuestra: Capítulo 0
"Nostalgia de Otoño" (with De La Rose)	2025	—	—	—	—	—	—	—	—	—	24		Cosa Nuestra: Capítulo 0
"Besito en la Frente"	2025	—	—	—	—	—	—	—	—	—	12		Cosa Nuestra: Capítulo 0
"Rosita" (with Tainy and Jhayco)	2026	—	—	—	—	—	—	—	—	—	12		Non-album singles
"Pongo" (with Rvssian and Wizkid)	2026	—	—	—	—	—	—	75	—	—	19		Non-album singles
"Macacoa 2000"	2026	—	—	—	—	—	—	—	—	—	—		Grand Theft Auto VI: The Album
"—" denotes a recording that did not chart or was not released in that territory.

=== As featured artist ===
List of singles as a featured artist, with selected chart positions and certifications, showing year released
Title	Year	Peak chart positions					Certifications	Album
Title	Year	PRI	ARG	MEX	SPA	US Latin	Certifications	Album
"Luz Apaga" (Ozuna featuring Lunay, Rauw Alejandro, and Lyanno)	2018	—	63	—	50	26	PROMUSICAE: Gold	Non-album singles
"Cuerpo en Venta" (Noriel featuring Myke Towers, Rauw Alejandro, and Almighty)	2019	—	—	—	34	—	PROMUSICAE: Gold	Non-album singles
"Tequila Sunrise" (Cali y El Dandee featuring Rauw Alejandro)	2019	—	—	—	—	—	RIAA: Gold (Latin)	Colegio
"Suave (Remix)" (Jey Blessing featuring Rauw Alejandro and Los Fantastikos)	2019	—	—	—	81	—		Non-album single
"Nada" (with Cazzu and Lyanno featuring Dalex)	2019	—	—	—	—	—		Error 93
"Infiel" (Eix featuring Brytiago, Rauw Alejandro, and Los Fantastikos or remix with Eix and Noriel featuring KEVVO, Brytiago, and Jay Wheeler)	2019	—	—	—	—	—	RIAA: Platinum (Latin)	Yo Soy Eix
"4 besos" (with Lola Indigo and Lalo Ebratt)	2020	—	—	—	7	—	PROMUSICAE: 2× Platinum	Non-album single
"La Cama (remix)" (with Lunay, Myke Towers, Ozuna and Chencho Corleone)	2020	—	—	—	16	—	PROMUSICAE: Gold	Está de Moda, Noche de Travesuras and Si Te Dejas Llevar
"Cositas" (Brytiago featuring Rauw Alejandro)	2020	—	—	—	—	—	RIAA: Gold (Latin)	Orgánico
"Dembow 2020" (Yandel featuring Rauw Alejandro)	2020	—	—	—	35	49	RIAA: Platinum (Latin); PROMUSICAE: Gold	Quien Contra Mí 2
"Estadia" (Omy De Oro featuring Rauw Alejandro)	2020	2	—	—	—	—	RIAA: Platinum (Latin)	El Rey del Punchline
"Fantasía Sexual" (Lunay, Brytiago and Revol featuring Rauw Alejandro and Myke Towers)	2021	—	—	—	27	—		Non-album singles
"Me Fijé" (Alex Rose featuring Rauw Alejandro)	2021	—	84	—	7	—	PROMUSICAE: 2× Platinum	Non-album singles
"Poderosa" (Lyanno featuring Rauw Alejandro)	2021	13	—	—	84	—		El Cambio
"Una Más" (with Tainy and Yandel)	2021	—	—	—	—	—	RIAA: Platinum (Latin)	Dynasty
"Loquita" (Reik featuring Rauw Aljeandro)	2021	—	—	—	—	—		Non-album single
"Sabe" (Nicki Nicole featuring Rauw Alejandro)	2021	11	19	14	28	—	RIAA: Gold(Latin); PROMUSICAE: Gold	Parte de Mí
"Agua" (Daddy Yankee featuring Rauw Alejandro and Nile Rodgers)	2022	—	—	—	52	21		Legendaddy
"Loco por Perrearte" (Remix) (De La Ghetto featuring Rauw Alejandro)	2022	—	—	—	—	44		Non-album single
"—" denotes a recording that did not chart or was not released in that territory.

=== Promotional singles ===
List of promotional singles, with selected chart positions, showing year released and album name
Title	Year	Peak chart positions		Album
Title	Year	US Latin	SPA	Album
"Como Nunca" (featuring Lyanno)	2016	—	—	Non-album single
"No Me Siento Igual" (featuring Joyce Santana)	2016	—	26	Punto de Equilibrio
"Días Así"	2016	—	—	Non-album singles
"Se Tú" (featuring Lyanno & Sou$a)	2016	—	—	Non-album singles
"Pa' Serio" (featuring Brray)	2016	—	—	Non-album singles
"Comodo"	2016	—	—	Non-album singles
"Donde"	2016	—	—	Punto de Equilibrio
"Se Tu"	2017	—	—	Non-album singles
"Tómalo"	2017	—	—	Non-album singles
"Estamos Mal"	2017	—	—	Non-album singles
"Anoche"	2018	—	—	Non-album singles
"Dale" (with Sousa and Mr. Naisgai)	2018	—	—	Non-album singles
"Dimelo en la Cara" (with Mark B, & Alofoke Music)	2018	—	—	Non-album singles
"Cubierto de Ti" (with Lary Over)	2019	—	—	Trap Cake, Vol. 1
"Mis Días Sin Ti" (with Bryant Myers)	2019	—	—	Non-album singles
"Yo Sabía"	2020	—	—	Non-album singles
"Ponte Pa' Mí" (with Myke Towers and Sky Rompiendo)	2020	—	32	Afrodisíaco
"Algo Mágico"	2020	—	69	Afrodisíaco
"Perreo Pesau'"	2021	—	—	Afrodisíaco
"Desenfocao'"	2021	—	81	Vice Versa
"Nubes"	2021	—	—	Vice Versa
"Hunter"	2021	—	—	Non-album single
"Museo"	2022	—	52	Trap Cake, Vol. 2
"Dime Quién????"	2022	36	80	Saturno
"Ron Cola" (with Súbelo Neo)	2022	—	19	Saturno
"Qué Rico Ch**gamos"	2022	44	91	Saturno
"—" denotes a recording that did not chart or was not released in that territory.

=== Charity singles ===
List of charity singles, with selected chart positions and certifications, showing year released and notes
Title	Year	Peak chart positions	Notes
Title	Year	US Latin Pop	Notes
"Color Esperanza" (various artists)	2020	21	Sony Music Latin and Global Citizen joined forces to release a new version of song to benefit the Pan American Health Organization's (PAHO) response to the COVID-19 pandemic.

== Other charted and certified songs ==
List of other charted and certified songs, with chart positions and certifications, showing year released and album name
Title	Year	Peak chart positions				Certifications	Album
Title	Year	US	US Latin	SPA	WW	Certifications	Album
"Química" (with Zion & Lennox and Mr. Naisgai)	2020	—	—	88	—		Afrodisíaco
"Soy Una Gargola" (with Arcángel and Randy)	2020	—	—	66	—		Afrodisíaco
"En Mi Habitación" (with Wisin and Lunay featuring Los Legendarios)	2021	—	—	—	—	RIAA: Gold (Latin)	Los Legendarios 001
"Aquel Nap ZzZz"	2021	—	37	64	—	PROMUSICAE: Gold	Vice Versa
"Cosa Guapa"	2021	—	—	53	—		Vice Versa
"La Old Skul"	2021	—	—	45	—		Vice Versa
"Corazón Despeinado"	2023	—	—	57	—	PROMUSICAE: Gold	Saturno
"Promesa"	2023	—	—	20	—		RR
"Volver" (with Tainy, Skrillex and Four Tet)	2023	—	—	59	—		Data
"Cuando Baje el Sol"	2023	—	45	—	—		Playa Saturno
"Al Callao'"	2023	—	48	—	—		Playa Saturno
"Picardía" (with Junior H)	2023	—	42	—	—	AMPROFON: Platinum	Playa Saturno
"No Hay Ley Parte 2" (with Kali Uchis)	2024	— (Note: "No Hay Ley Parte 2" did not enter the Billboard Hot 100, but peaked at number 15 on the Bubbling Under Hot 100 chart.)	24	—	—		Orquídeas
"Hey Lil Mama" (with Eladio Carrión)	2024	—	36	9	—		Sol María
"Cohete" (with Shakira)	2024	—	48	28	—		Las Mujeres Ya No Lloran
"Dolida" (with Chencho Corleone)	2024	—	—	59	—		Solo
"Cosa Nuestra"	2024	— (Note: "Cosa Nuestra" did not enter the Billboard Hot 100, but peaked at number 17 on the Bubbling Under Hot 100 chart.)	20	38	—		Cosa Nuestra
"Tú con Él"	2024	69	6	14	65		Cosa Nuestra
"Committed" (with Pharrell Williams)	2024	— (Note: "Committed" did not enter the Billboard Hot 100, but peaked at number nine on the Bubbling Under Hot 100 chart.)	15	39	—		Cosa Nuestra
"Espresso Martini" (with Marconi Impara and Yan Block)	2024	— (Note: "Espresso Martini" did not enter the Billboard Hot 100, but peaked at number 11 on the Bubbling Under Hot 100 chart.)	16	28	—		Cosa Nuestra
"Baja Pa' Acá" (with Alexis & Fido)	2024	— (Note: "Baja Pa' Acá" did not enter the Billboard Hot 100, but peaked at number eight on the Bubbling Under Hot 100 chart.)	14	36	—		Cosa Nuestra
"Ni Me Conozco"	2024	— (Note: "Ni Me Conozco" did not enter the Billboard Hot 100, but peaked at number three on the Bubbling Under Hot 100 chart.)	12	26	—		Cosa Nuestra
"Il Capo"	2024	—	26	59	—		Cosa Nuestra
"Revolú" (with Feid)	2024	88	8	15	123		Cosa Nuestra
"Mil Mujeres"	2024	— (Note: "Mil Mujeres" did not enter the Billboard Hot 100, but peaked at number 23 on the Bubbling Under Hot 100 chart.)	24	57	—		Cosa Nuestra
"Amar de Nuevo"	2024	— (Note: "Amar de Nuevo" did not enter the Billboard Hot 100, but peaked at number 14 on the Bubbling Under Hot 100 chart.)	18	45	—		Cosa Nuestra
"2:12" (with Latin Mafia)	2024	—	29	84	—		Cosa Nuestra
"SexxxMachine"	2024	—	40	—	—		Cosa Nuestra
"Besito en la Frente"	2025	—	95	—	—		Cosa Nuestra: Capítulo 0
"—" denotes a recording that did not chart or was not released in that territory.

== Guest appearances ==
List of non-single guest appearances, with other performing artists, showing year released and album name
Title	Year	Other artist(s)	Album
"Exclusiva (remix)"	2017	Lyanno, Fred Oda, Brray, Rafa Pabön, Chris Wandell	None
"Se Supone"	2017	Huztle, Ezzy Rose	None
"Menos Timidez"	2017	Lyanno, Subelo NEO	None
"Desapareció"	2017	Wiso Rivera	None
"Luz Roja"	2017	Saox, Joyce Santana	None
"Una Demoniaca"	2018	Cozmek Jabon, Lyan el Bebesi	None
"Tarde"	2018	Rafa Pabön	None
"La Bellakera" (Remix)	2018	Lyanno, Anonimus & Gigolo Y La Exce, Amarion	None
"Mi Llamada"	2018	Lyanno, Alex Rose, Lenny Taváres	None
"Hoy"	2018	Lenny Tavárez, Cauty, Lyanno	None
"Matémonos"	2018	Green Cookie, Lyanno, Marconi Impara	None
"La Pastillita (Remix)"	2018	Los Proximos, Paulino Rey, Rafa Pabön, Lyanno, Eladio Carrión, Anonimus, Brray, Joyce Santana, Sousa, Mora & KRZ	None
"Restringida"	2018	Carlitos Rossy	None
"Pensando"	2018	Yashua	777
"Olvidemos"	2018	Los Proximos, Lyanno, Álvaro Díaz, Sousa & Saox	None
"Pa Tu Casa"	2018	Kevin Roldán, KHEA	None
"Dile a El"	2018	Kingzy	None
"Borrarte"	2018	Cauty	None
"Combinamos"	2018	Pancho el de la Avenida, Carlitos Rossy	El de la Avenida
"Road Trip"	2018	Darkiel, Boy Wonder, Lyanno & Myke Towers	None
"Secreto"	2018	Amarion, Randy, Darkiel, Anonimus, and Mora	None
"Que Bien Te Ves"	2018	Revol	None
"Corazón Muerto" (Remix)	2019	Anonimus, Darkiel, Randy, Eix, and Javiielo	Sinonimus
"Miénteme" (Remix)	2019	Papi Sousa, Cazzu, Lyanno, and Álvaro Díaz	None
"Dice Que No"	2019	Öken, Darkiel & Eladio Carrión	None
"Costear (Equipo Rojo Remix)"	2019	Jhay Cortez, Almighty, Juanka, Bryant Myers, Justin Quiles, Lyanno, Eladio Carrion, and Joyce Santana	None
"Se Moja"	2019	Eladio Carrión, Amenazzy, and Noriel	None
"Domingo" (Remix)	2019	Reykon, Cosculluela, Greeicy	None
"Lil Bebe (Bebecito Remix)"	2019	DaniLeigh and Nio García	None
"Fumeteo"	2019	Darell	None
"Vuelva a Ver" (Remix)	2019	Dalex, Lyanno and Justin Quiles, Sech	Climaxxx
"La Mentira" (Remix)	2019	Brytiago, Rafa Pabön, Sech, Myke Towers, Cazzu	None
"Mi Llamada" (Remix)	2019	Lyanno, Lunay, Alex Rose, Cazzu, Eladio Carrión, Lenny Tavárez	None
"Te Hace Falta"	2019	Derek Novah	None
"Trapperz A Mafia Da Sicilia"	2019	Felp 22, Duki, MC Davo & Fuego	None
"Aroma"	2019	LIT killah, Dayme y El High, JD Pantoja	None
"Desnuda"	2019	Kris R.	None
"Rompe Cabezas"	2019	Anonimus, Nio García, Casper Mágico, Lary Over	Sinonimus
"Date Tu Guille"	2019	Milly, Farruko & Myke Towers, Lary Over, Sharo Towers	Honey Bee
"Videos"	2019	Álvaro Díaz	None
"Ontas?" (Remix)	2019	Alex Rose, Miky Woodz, Jd Pantoja & Juhn	Lost
"No Me Ignores"	2019	Jay Menez, Myke Towers, Cazzu, Eladio Carrión	None
"Hoy Se Bebe" (Remix)	2019	Nio García, Brytiago	None
"Extrañándote"	2019	vf7 (Lenny Tavárez and Beéle are also included for the remix version)	None
"Brinquen" (Remix)	2019	Marconi Impara, Mozart La Para, Ranking Stone	None
"Supéralo"	2019	Lyanno, Cauty, Subelo NEO	None
"La Más Linda"	2019	Casper Mágico	None
"Sentimientos Escondidos" (Remix)	2019	J Álvarez, Farina, Lyanno, Andy Rivera	El Jonson
"Solo"	2020	Jay Menez (Nio Garcia is also included for the remix version)	None
"Es Normal" (Remix)	2020	Javiielo	None
"Cobrale"	2020	Tito El Bambino, Lyanno, Miky Woodz, Rafa Pabön	None
"Contando Lunares" (Remix)	2020	Don Patricio, Anitta	None
"Sheesh" (Remix)	2020	Brray, Jon Z, Cazzu, Joyce Santana, C. Tangana, Eladio Carrión, Pablo Chill-E, ECKO, Young Martino	None
"Tu Juego"	2020	Tempo, Lyanno	None
"Ojitos"	2020	Bryant Myers, Lyanno	Bendecido
"No Fue" (Remix)	2020	Leebrian, Cauty, Brray, Feid	None
"Anda Deja"	2020	Lary Over, Lil Geniuz	None
"No te obligue"	2020	Xander el Imaginario	None
"Don't Rush" (Remix)	2020	Young T & Bugsey	None
"Despacio"	2020	MOTi	None
"Hola"	2020	Valentino, Darell	None
"Mi Estilo de Vida II"	2020	Ñejo, Miky Woodz, Myke Towers, Arcángel, Kenai, Ñengo Flow	None
"Héroe"	2020	Carlos Arroyo	None
"Huracheee"	2020	Farruko, Arcángel, Ez El Ezeta, Lary Over	None
"Lento" (Remix)	2020	Lauren Jauregui	None
"La Curiosidad (Blue Grand Prix Remix)"	2020	Jay Wheeler, Myke Towers, Dj Nelson, Jhay Cortez, Lunay & Kendo Kaponi	None
"Zorra (Remix)"	2021	Bad Gyal	Warm Up
"Es Que Tú"	2021	Chris Andrew, Wisin, Los Legendarios	None
"Un Minuto"	2021	Papi Sousa	None
"Playa"	2021	Sech	42
"Diosa"	2021	Zion & Lennox	El Sistema
"Toda La Noche"	2021	Alex Gargolas, Caleb Calloway	Gárgolas Forever
"Odiame o Quiéreme"	2021	Randy	Romances de una Nota 2021, Vol. 2
"Si Pepe" (Remix)	2021	Ankhal, Jhay Cortez, Arcángel, Farruko, Luar la L, Miky Woodz	None
"Suelta"	2022	Dímelo Flow, Farruko, Mr. Vegas, María Becerra, Fatman Scoop	Always Dream
"Sci-Fi"	2022	Tainy	None
"Vapor"	2022	Wisin & Yandel	La Última Misión
"FP"	2023	Arcángel	Sentimiento, Elegancia y Más Maldad
"KIZAO"	2024	MILLENNIUM PARADE, Tainy	None

== Footnotes ==
- Note 1: Uses combined chart entries for "Tattoo" and "Tattoo (remix)".
