= Ponte Pa' Mí =

2020 song by Rauw Alejandro, Myke Towers, and Sky Rompiendo

Promotional single by Rauw Alejandro, Myke Towers, and Sky Rompiendo

from the album Afrodisíaco
- Language: Spanish
- Released: April 16, 2020
- Genre: Dancehall; reggaeton
- Length: 3:04
- Label: Duars
- Songwriters: Raúl A. Ocasio Ruiz "Rauw Alejandro"; Alejandro Ramírez "Sky"; Orlando J. Cepeda; José M. Reyes Díaz; Michael Torres "Myke Towers"; José M. Collazo "Colla"; Eric Pérez Rovira "Eric Duars"
- Producer: Sky Rompiendo

Rauw Alejandro Promotional singles chronology
| "Yo Sabía" (2020) | "Ponte Pa' Mí" (2020) | "Algo Mágico" (2020) |

Music video
- "Ponte Pa' Mí" on YouTube

"Ponte Pa' Mí" (transl. "Put on for Me") is a song recorded by Puerto Rican singer Rauw Alejandro, Puerto Rican rapper Myke Towers, and Colombian producer Sky Rompiendo for Alejandro's debut studio album, Afrodisíaco (2020). The song was written by Alejandro, Sky, Orlando J. Cepeda, José M. Reyes Díaz, Towers, Colla, and Eric Duars, while the production was handled by Sky. It was released for digital download and streaming by Duars Entertainment on April 16, 2020, as the first promotional single from the album.

A Spanish language dancehall and modern reggaeton track, it is a sensual song that hints at an intimate and romantic situation, expressing the feelings of someone who is anticipating "a return that may never happen". "Ponte Pa' Mí" received positive reviews from music critics, who complimented its smooth rhythms. The song debuted and peaked at number 32 in Spain and was certified gold in the country. An accompanying music video, released simultaneously with the song, was filmed in Miami, and directed by Gustavo "Gus" Camacho. The song was included on the set list for Alejandro's the Rauw Alejandro World Tour.

== Background and release ==
In January 2020, Rauw Alejandro revealed the titles of four of his upcoming songs, including "Ponte Pa' Mí", which was highlighted to be a collaboration. In February 2020, he announced that he was working on his debut studio album Afrodisíaco. On April 12, 2020, he confirmed that "Ponte Pa' Mí" would be included in the album and wrote: "My next song is one of the most important projects I've worked on in my career. 'Musically' and 'Visually' I can fully show my art and my vision as an artist." The track was released for digital download and streaming by Duars Entertainment as the first promotional single from Afrodisíaco on April 16, 2020, being a collaboration with Myke Towers and Sky Rompiendo. It was later included as the 14th track on the album, released November 13, 2020.

== Music and lyrics ==
"Ponte Pa' Mí"
An 18-second sample of the chorus

Musically, "Ponte Pa' Mí" is a Spanish language dancehall and modern reggaeton song, written by Alejandro, Sky, Orlando J. Cepeda, José M. Reyes Díaz, Towers, Colla, and Eric Duars. Its production was handled by Sky, and the track runs for a total of three minutes and four seconds. Lyrically, "Ponte Pa' Mí" which translates to "Put on for Me" in English, is a sensual song that hints at an intimate and romantic situation. It express the feelings of someone who is anticipating "a return that may never happen". The lyrics begins with, "Sigo esperando que suene tu llamada / ¿Cuándo es que vas a volver? / Yo sé que me piensas / Como yo te pienso a ti" (I keep waiting for your call to ring / When are you going to come back? / I know that you think of me / The way I think of you).

== Reception ==
Upon release, "Ponte Pa' Mí" was met with positive reviews from music critics. An author of Estación 40 named Alejandro and Towers the "two leaders of the new urban generation", while Angel Castillo from LoMasRankiaO labeled them "two of the most acclaimed hitmakers of the genre" and praised the use of "smooth" dancehall-influenced rhythms that created "the perfect formula for a contemporary reggaeton gem". Happy FM staff stated that Alejandro has "left us speechless" with the release of the song and described it as "a success that will give a lot to talk about in the coming months". In 2022, Ernesto Lechner from Rolling Stone ranked the track as the singer's ninth-best song.

"Ponte Pa' Mí" debuted and peaked at number 32 on Spain's official weekly chart on April 26, 2020. It was later certified platinum by the Productores de Música de España (PROMUSICAE), for track-equivalent sales of over 60,000 units in the country.

== Promotion ==
=== Music video ===
A screenshot from the music video, depicting Alejandro and his dancers delivering a choreography.

An accompanying music video was released simultaneously with the song. The visual was filmed in Miami, produced by Mastermind Entertainment, and directed by Gustavo "Gus" Camacho, who had also directed the videos for Alejandro's previous singles "Fantasías", "Fantasías (Remix)", and "Elegí". It contains the participation of both Alejandro and Towers, depicting Alejandro delivering a choreography.

=== Live performances ===
"Ponte Pa' Mí" was included on the set list for Alejandro's the Rauw Alejandro World Tour.

== Track listing ==
Digital download / streaming
| No. | Title | Length |
|---|---|---|
| 1. | "Ponte Pa' Mí" | 3:04 |

== Credits and personnel ==
Credits adapted from Tidal.

- Rauw Alejandro – associated performer, composer, lyricist
- Myke Towers – associated performer, composer, lyricist
- Sky Rompiendo – associated performer, composer, lyricist, producer
- Orlando J. Cepeda – composer, lyricist
- José M. Reyes Díaz – composer, lyricist
- José M. Collazo "Colla" – composer, lyricist, mastering engineer, mixing engineer
- Eric Pérez Rovira "Eric Duars" – composer, lyricist, executive producer
- Amber Rubi Urena – A&R coordinator
- John Eddie Pérez – A&R director
- Jorge E. Pizarro "Kenobi" – recording engineer

== Charts ==
Weekly peak performance for "Ponte Pa' Mí"
| Chart (2020) | Peak position |
|---|---|
| Spain (Promusicae) | 32 |

== Certifications ==
Certifications and sales for "Ponte Pa' Mí"
| Region | Certification | Certified units/sales |
|---|---|---|
| Spain (Promusicae) | Platinum | 60,000^{‡} |
^{‡} Sales+streaming figures based on certification alone.

== Release history ==
Release dates and formats for "Ponte Pa' Mí"
| Region | Date | Format(s) | Label | Ref. |
|---|---|---|---|---|
| Various | April 16, 2020 | Digital download; streaming | Duars Entertainment | |
