= Reloj =

2020 single by Rauw Alejandro and Anuel AA

Single by Rauw Alejandro and Anuel AA

from the album Afrodisíaco
- Language: Spanish
- English title: "Clock"
- Released: October 22, 2020
- Genre: Reggaeton
- Length: 3:51
- Label: Sony Latin; Duars
- Songwriters: Raúl Alejandro Ocasio Ruiz "Rauw Alejandro"; Jean Pierre Soto "Yampi"; Luis Guillermo Marval Camero; Ernesto Padilla "Nesty"; Emmanuel Gazmey "Anuel AA"; Héctor C. López "Caleb Calloway"; Jorge E. Pizarro "Kenobi"; José M. Collazo "Colla"; Eric Pérez Rovira "Eric Duars"
- Producers: Caleb Calloway; Nesty

Rauw Alejandro singles chronology
"La Nota" (2020)	"Reloj" (2020)	"De Cora <3" (2020)

Anuel AA singles chronology
"Don Don" (2020)	"Reloj" (2020)	"Lemonade (Latin Remix)" (2020)

Music video
- "Reloj" on YouTube

"Reloj" (transl. "Clock") is a song recorded by Puerto Rican singer Rauw Alejandro and Puerto Rican rapper Anuel AA for Alejandro's debut studio album, Afrodisíaco (2020), and released for digital download and streaming by Sony Music Latin and Duars Entertainment on October 22, 2020, as the fourth single from the album.

"Reloj" received positive reviews from music critics, who complimented its rhythms. The track was nominated for Viral Anthem at the 2021 MTV Millennial Awards. It was commercially successful, reaching the top 10 in several Latin American countries, including Colombia and Mexico, and on Billboard's Hot Latin Songs in the United States. The song has received several certifications, including double platinum in Spain. An accompanying music video, released simultaneously with the song and directed by Gustavo Camacho, depicts Alejandro and Anuel AA enjoying a party atmosphere and singing the track in a strip club.

== Background and release ==
Rauw Alejandro announced that he was working on his debut studio album Afrodisíaco in February 2020. After releasing several singles from the album, he announced the release of a collaboration with Anuel AA and revealed the song's title as "Reloj" on Twitter on October 21, 2020: "🦊 x 👹 #Reloj tomorrow at 8PM ..." (Note: Fox Face (🦊) and Japanese Ogre (👹) emojis represent Rauw Alejandro and Anuel AA, respectively.) Alejandro later explained to Idolator that he and Anuel AA were classmates in school and "childhood friends". He added: "The vibe at the studio was amazing, very easy to work with." On October 22, 2020, "Reloj" was released for digital download and streaming by Sony Music Latin and Duars Entertainment as the fourth single from Afrodisíaco. It marked the third collaboration between Alejandro and Anuel AA, who had previously worked on "Elegí (Remix)" and "Fantasías (Remix)".

== Music and lyrics ==
"Reloj"
A 23-second sample of the chorus, which features urban rhythms.

Musically, "Reloj" is a Spanish-language melodic reggaeton song with urban rhythms that "fuses the styles" of both artists to "present a totally different proposal". Written by Alejandro, Yampi, Luis Guillermo Marval Camerom, Nesty, Anuel AA, Caleb Calloway, Kenobi, Colla, and Eric Duars, the track, produced by Calloway and Nesty, runs for a total of 3 minutes and 51 seconds. Lyrically, "Reloj", which translates to "Clock" in English, is about the sexual desire the singers feel towards a girl, describing everything they would do to her if the clock had more hours. The "sensual" lyrics include, "No hizo nada mal, pero quiere que la castigue / Gime como una muñequita de anime (Wah) / Como una serie pegá', viéndo me sigue (Wuh) / Y yo loco con verla mordiendo los cojine'" (She did nothing wrong, but she wants me to punish her / Moans like an anime doll (Wah) / Like a hit series, watches and follows me (Wuh) / And I'm crazy to see her biting the cushions).

== Critical reception ==
Laura Coca from Los 40 gave "Reloj" a positive review and labeled it "a song with the most mesmerizing urban rhythms", stating that Alejandro "never tires of throwing hits". In another article, she described the track as "a song of pure reggaeton rhythms to become the new vice of their millions of followers." In 2022, Fuse ranked it as Alejandro's third-top song. In the same year, Ernesto Lechner from Rolling Stone ranked the track as his 45th-best song.

=== Accolades ===
"Reloj" was nominated for Viral Anthem at the 2021 MTV Millennial Awards, but lost to "Pareja del Año" by Sebastián Yatra and Myke Towers. "Reloj" was recognized as an award-winning song at the 2023 BMI Latin Awards.

== Commercial performance ==
"Reloj" debuted at number 26 on the US Billboard Hot Latin Songs chart on November 7, 2020, becoming Alejandro's 10th entry and Anuel AA's 65th. On May 1, 2021, the track reached its peak of number 10, giving Alejandro his fourth top-10 hit on the chart and Anuel AA's 22nd. The song also peaked at numbers 18, 11, and 8 on the Latin Airplay, Latin Rhythm Airplay, and Latin Digital Song Sales charts, respectively. In Spain's official weekly chart, the track debuted and peaked at number 11 on November 1, 2020. It was later certified double platinum by the Productores de Música de España (PROMUSICAE), for track-equivalent sales of over 80,000 units in the country. "Reloj" also reached the top 10 in Colombia, Dominican Republic, El Salvador, Guatemala, Honduras, Mexico, and Peru, as well as the top 20 in Argentina, Bolivia, Ecuador, Latin America, Paraguay, Puerto Rico, and Uruguay. In Mexico, the song was certified diamond + 4× platinum by the Asociación Mexicana de Productores de Fonogramas y Videogramas (AMPROFON), for track-equivalent sales of over 540,000 units.

== Promotion ==
=== Music video ===
A screenshot from the music video, depicting Alejandro flirting with a stripper in the strip club.

An accompanying music video was released simultaneously with the song. The visual was directed by Gustavo "Gus" Camacho, who had previously directed the video for Alejandro's singles "Fantasías" and "Tattoo (Remix)". It depicts Alejandro and Anuel AA enjoying a party atmosphere and singing the track in a strip club, while multiple women in undergarment are dancing to the rhythm of it. In another scene, Alejandro and Anuel AA are shown singing the song in a dressing room.

=== Live performances ===
The song was included on the set list for Alejandro's the Vice Versa Tour.

== Track listing ==
Digital download / streaming
No.	Title	Length
1.	"Reloj"	3:51

== Credits and personnel ==
Credits adapted from Tidal.

- Rauw Alejandro – associated performer, composer, lyricist
- Anuel AA – associated performer, composer, lyricist
- Jean Pierre Soto "Yampi" – composer, lyricist
- Luis Guillermo Marval Camero – composer, lyricist
- Ernesto Padilla "Nesty" – composer, lyricist, producer
- Héctor C. López "Caleb Calloway" – composer, lyricist, producer
- Jorge E. Pizarro "Kenobi" – composer, lyricist, recording engineer
- José M. Collazo "Colla" – composer, lyricist, mastering engineer, mixing engineer
- Eric Pérez Rovira "Eric Duars" – composer, lyricist, executive producer
- Amber Rubi Urena – A&R coordinator
- John Eddie Pérez – A&R director

== Charts ==
=== Weekly charts ===
Weekly chart performance for "Reloj"
Chart (2020–2021)	Peak position
Argentina Hot 100 (Billboard)	11
Bolivia (Monitor Latino)	18
Colombia (Monitor Latino)	4
Colombia (National-Report)	3
Costa Rica Urbano (Monitor Latino)	10
Dominican Republic (Monitor Latino)	4
Ecuador (Monitor Latino)	16
El Salvador (Monitor Latino)	10
Global 200 (Billboard)	41
Guatemala (Monitor Latino)	7
Honduras (Monitor Latino)	10
Latin America (Monitor Latino)	18
Mexico Streaming (AMPROFON)	5
Paraguay (Monitor Latino)	13
Peru (Monitor Latino)	4
Peru Streaming (UNIMPRO)	5
Puerto Rico (Monitor Latino)	15
Uruguay (Monitor Latino)	13
Spain (Promusicae)	11
US Bubbling Under Hot 100 (Billboard)	25
US Hot Latin Songs (Billboard)	10
US Latin Airplay (Billboard)	18
US Latin Rhythm Airplay (Billboard)	11

=== Monthly charts ===
Monthly chart position for "Reloj"
Chart (2020–2021)	Peak position
Paraguay (SGP)	23

=== Year-end charts ===
2021 year-end chart performance for "Reloj"
Chart (2021)	Position
Colombia (Monitor Latino)	21
Costa Rica (Monitor Latino)	54
Dominican Republic (Monitor Latino)	26
Ecuador (Monitor Latino)	38
El Salvador (Monitor Latino)	30
Global 200 (Billboard)	109
Guatemala (Monitor Latino)	12
Honduras (Monitor Latino)	21
Latin America (Monitor Latino)	34
Nicaragua (Monitor Latino)	23
Paraguay (Monitor Latino)	39
Peru (Monitor Latino)	10
Puerto Rico (Monitor Latino)	75
Spain (PROMUSICAE)	83
Uruguay (Monitor Latino)	92
US Hot Latin Songs (Billboard)	21
US Latin Rhythm Airplay (Billboard)	37
Venezuela Urbano (Monitor Latino)	70

2022 year-end chart performance for "Reloj"
Chart (2022)	Position
Costa Rica Urbano (Monitor Latino)	68
Honduras Urbano (Monitor Latino)	100
Peru Urbano (Monitor Latino)	68

2023 year-end chart performance for "Reloj"
Chart (2023)	Position
Peru Urbano (Monitor Latino)	84

== Certifications ==
Certifications and sales for "Reloj"
Region	Certification	Certified units/sales
Brazil (Pro-Música Brasil)	Gold	20,000^{‡}
Colombia	4× Diamond	
Mexico (AMPROFON)	2× Diamond+3× Platinum	780,000^{‡}
Spain (Promusicae)	3× Platinum	180,000^{‡}
Streaming
Central America (CFC)	4× Platinum	28,000,000^{†}
^{‡} Sales+streaming figures based on certification alone.^{†} Streaming-only figures based on certification alone.

== Release history ==
Release dates and formats for "Reloj"
Region	Date	Format(s)	Label	Ref.
Various	October 22, 2020	Digital download; streaming	Sony Music Latin; Duars Entertainment	
Latin America	October 23, 2020	Contemporary hit radio	Sony Music Latin; Duars Entertainment	
