= De Cora =

2020 single by Rauw Alejandro and J Balvin

"De Cora <3"

Single by Rauw Alejandro and J Balvin

from the album Afrodisíaco
- Language: Spanish
- English title: "From Heart <3"
- Released: November 12, 2020
- Genre: Urbano
- Length: 3:10
- Label: Sony Latin; Duars
- Songwriters: Raúl Alejandro Ocasio Ruiz "Rauw Alejandro"; Héctor C. López "Caleb Calloway"; José M. Collazo "Colla"; Eric Pérez Rovira "Eric Duars"; Angel Ruben Díaz "D'Alexis"; José Álvaro Osorio Balvín "J Balvin"
- Producers: Caleb Calloway; El Zorro

Rauw Alejandro singles chronology
"Reloj" (2020)	"De Cora <3" (2020)	"Fantasía Sexual" (2021)

J Balvin singles chronology
"Mood (Remix)" (2020)	"De Cora <3" (2020)	"Baby" (2020)

Music video
- "De Cora 💙" on YouTube

"De Cora <3" (transl. "From Heart <3", also stylized as "De Cora 💙") is a song recorded by Puerto Rican singer Rauw Alejandro and Colombian singer J Balvin for Alejandro's debut studio album, Afrodisíaco (2020). It was written by Alejandro, Caleb Calloway, Colla, Eric Duars, D'Alexis, and Balvin, while the production was handled by Calloway and Alejandro. The song was released for digital download and streaming by Sony Music Latin and Duars Entertainment on November 12, 2020, as the fifth single from the album. A Spanish language romantic urbano song, it expresses the feelings of someone who still misses his ex-partner, wishing her the best.

"De Cora <3" received positive reviews from music critics, who complimented its rhythms and the contrast in the singers' vocals. The track was commercially successful, reaching number one in El Salvador, Honduras, Panama, and Puerto Rico, as well as the top five in Guatemala and Mexico. In Spain and on Billboard's Hot Latin Songs in the United States, it peaked in the top 20. The song has received several certifications, including platinum in Spain. An accompanying music video, released simultaneously with the song, was directed by Gustavo "Gus" Camacho. It depicts the singers as two prisoners who go to a work camp, cleaning and trimming trees made of clouds, to make it rain for their beloved. To promote the song, Alejandro and Balvin performed it on The Late Late Show with James Corden.

== Background and release ==
Rauw Alejandro announced that he was working on his debut studio album Afrodisíaco in February 2020. On October 13, 2020, he shared photos of himself along with J Balvin on social media, using the hashtag #Afrodisíaco, confirming that there would be a collaboration between the two singers on the album. On November 9, 2020, Alejandro revealed the album's track list, including his collaboration with Balvin, entitled "De Cora <3", as the sixth track. On November 12, 2020, the song was released for digital download and streaming by Sony Music Latin and Duars Entertainment as the fourth single from Afrodisíaco. During an interview with MTV News, Alejandro talked about the collaboration:

J Balvin is like my big brother. I've known him for almost two years. To me, he always opened the doors of his studio and his friendship. We always wanted to collaborate. I was waiting for the perfect time, for the perfect song. "De Cora <3" was the perfect track. It's a romantic and happy song, but the lyrics are sad. You're crying but at the same time dancing.

== Composition and lyrics ==
"De Cora <3"
A 19-second sample of the chorus

Musically, "De Cora <3" is a Spanish language urbano song, written by Alejandro, Caleb Calloway, Colla, Eric Duars, D'Alexis, and Balvin. Its production was handled by Calloway and Alejandro, and the track runs for a total of 3 minutes and 10 seconds. As Alejandro explains, "De Cora", which translates to "From Heart" in English, is a common phrase in Puerto Rico, when they "really mean something". "<3" represents a "little heart symbol" which used to be popular on SMS messages in the 2000s.

Lyrically, "De Cora <3" is a romantic song about living with a young woman in a beautiful home, expressing the feelings of someone who still misses his partner. It talks about how you can wish your ex-partner the best, even if you are no longer with her. The lyrics include, "Extraño el sabor de tu boca / Extraño saborearte / A tu cuerpo le digo Picasso, porque tu eres arte / Me obligan a pensarte" (I miss the taste of your mouth / I miss tasting you / I call your body Picasso because you are art / They force me to think about you).

== Critical reception ==
Alberto Palao Murcia from Los 40 gave "De Cora <3" a positive review, saying it "invites you to dance at all times thanks to its base". In 2022, Ernesto Lechner from Rolling Stone ranked the track as Alejandro's 13th-best song, stating that he "sounds perfectly" next to Balvin. The critic continued praising "the contrast in their voices" as "spectacular", while describing the song's chorus and pre-chorus as "addictive".

== Commercial performance ==
"De Cora <3" debuted and peaked at number 16 on the US Billboard Hot Latin Songs chart on November 28, 2020, becoming Alejandro's 12th entry and Balvin's 73rd. The song also peaked at numbers 19 and 11 on the Latin Airplay and Latin Rhythm Airplay charts, respectively. In Spain's official weekly chart, the track debuted and peaked at number 18 on November 1, 2020. It was later certified platinum by the Productores de Música de España (PROMUSICAE), for track-equivalent sales of over 40,000 units in the country. Additionally, "De Cora <3" reached number one in El Salvador, Honduras, Panama, and Puerto Rico, as well as the top 10 in Dominican Republic, Guatemala, and Mexico. In Mexico, the song was certified platinum by the Asociación Mexicana de Productores de Fonogramas y Videogramas (AMPROFON), for track-equivalent sales of over 140,000 units.

== Promotion ==
=== Music video ===
A screenshot from the music video, depicting Alejandro and Balvin climbing the clouds, using a ladder.

An accompanying music video was released simultaneously with the song. The visual was filmed in Colombia and directed by Venezuelan director Gustavo "Gus" Camacho, who had also directed the videos for Alejandro's previous singles "Fantasías", "Fantasías (Remix)", "Elegí", "Tattoo (Remix)", "Elegí (Remix)", and "Enchule". It depicts the singers as two prisoners who go to a work camp, cleaning and trimming trees made of clouds, to make it rain for their beloved.

=== Live performances ===
Alejandro and Balvin performed the song on The Late Late Show with James Corden on November 23, 2020.

== Track listing ==
Digital download / streaming
No.	Title	Length
1.	"De Cora <3"	3:10

== Credits and personnel ==
Credits adapted from Tidal.

- Rauw Alejandro – associated performer, composer, lyricist, producer
- J Balvin – associated performer, composer, lyricist
- Héctor C. López "Caleb Calloway" – composer, lyricist, producer
- José M. Collazo "Colla" – composer, lyricist, mastering engineer, mixing engineer
- Eric Pérez Rovira "Eric Duars" – composer, lyricist, executive producer
- Angel Ruben Díaz "D'Alexis" – composer, lyricist
- Amber Rubi Urena – A&R coordinator
- John Eddie Pérez – A&R director
- Jorge E. Pizarro "Kenobi" – recording engineer

== Charts ==
=== Weekly charts ===
Weekly chart performance for "De Cora <3"
Chart (2020–2021)	Peak position
Argentina Hot 100 (Billboard)	48
Dominican Republic (Monitor Latino)	6
El Salvador (Monitor Latino)	1
Global 200 (Billboard)	145
Guatemala (Monitor Latino)	4
Honduras (Monitor Latino)	1
Mexico Airplay (Billboard)	5
Panama (Monitor Latino)	1
Puerto Rico (Monitor Latino)	1
Spain (PROMUSICAE)	18
US Hot Latin Songs (Billboard)	16
US Latin Airplay (Billboard)	19
US Latin Rhythm Airplay (Billboard)	11

=== Monthly charts ===
Monthly chart position for "De Cora <3"
Chart (2020–2021)	Peak position
Paraguay (SGP)	59

=== Year-end charts ===
2021 year-end chart performance for "De Cora <3"
Chart (2021)	Position
Guatemala Pop (Monitor Latino)	76
Honduras (Monitor Latino)	57
Puerto Rico Urbano (Monitor Latino)	91
US Hot Latin Songs (Billboard)	87
US Latin Rhythm Airplay (Billboard)	49
Venezuela Urbano (Monitor Latino)	61

== Certifications ==
Certifications and sales for "De Cora <3"
Region	Certification	Certified units/sales
Colombia	Platinum	
Mexico (AMPROFON)	Platinum	140,000^{‡}
Spain (Promusicae)	Platinum	40,000^{‡}
Streaming
Central America (CFC)	Platinum	7,000,000^{†}
^{‡} Sales+streaming figures based on certification alone.^{†} Streaming-only figures based on certification alone.

== Release history ==
Release dates and formats for "De Cora <3"
Region	Date	Format	Label	Ref(s)
Various	November 12, 2020	Digital download; streaming	Sony Music Latin; Duars Entertainment	
Latin America	November 13, 2020	Contemporary hit radio	Sony Music Latin; Duars Entertainment	
Italy	November 27, 2020	Contemporary hit radio	Sony Music Latin; Duars Entertainment	
