= Cosa Nuestra =

Cosa Nuestra may refer to:

- Cosa Nuestra (Willie Colón album), featuring Héctor Lavoe, 1969
- Cosa Nuestra (Rauw Alejandro album), 2024
  - Cosa Nuestra: Capitulo 0, its sequel, 2025
  - Cosa Nuestra World Tour, the supporting concert tour
