= List of Billboard Argentina Hot 100 top-ten singles in 2020 =

This is a list of singles that charted in the top ten of the Billboard Argentina Hot 100 chart in 2020.

== Top-ten singles ==
Key

- ◁ – indicates single's top 10 entry was also its Hot 100 debut

List of Billboard Hot 100 top ten singles that peaked in 2020
Top ten entry date	Single	Artist(s)	Peak	Peak date	Weeks in top ten	Ref.
Singles from 2019
December 22	"Tusa"	Karol G and Nicki Minaj	1	January 19	38	
Singles from 2020
January 5	"Hola"	Dalex	6	March 8	11	
January 19	"Dance Monkey"	Tones and I	2	March 22	27	
February 9	"Sigues Con Él"	Arcángel and Sech	6	March 15	13	
February 23	"Múevelo"	Nicky Jam and Daddy Yankee	6	February 23	11	
March 15	"René"	Residente	2	March 15	3	
April 5	"Safaera" ◁	Bad Bunny, Jowell & Randy and Ñengo Flow	4	April 26	11	
April 5	"Yo Perreo Sola" ◁	Bad Bunny	2	April 12	17	
April 12	"Morado"	J Balvin	10	April 12	1	
April 19	"Favorito"	Camilo	2	April 26	16	
May 3	"Tattoo" (Note: The single re-entered the top ten on the week ending July 5, 2020.)	Rauw Alejandro and Camilo (Note: Camilo started being credited as a featured artist from the week ending July 26, 2020.)	1	August 2	29	
May 10	"Porfa (Remix)" (Note: The single re-entered the top ten on the week ending September 27, 2020.)	Feid, J Balvin, Maluma, Nicky Jam, Sech and Justin Quiles (Note: J Balvin, Maluma, Nicky Jam, Sech started being credited as co-lead artists from the week ending August 30, 2020.)	2	July 19	20	
May 17	"Loco"	Beéle	9	May 17	1	
June 7	"Colocao"	Nicki Nicole	6	June 14	4	
June 14	"Say So" (Note: The single re-entered the top ten on the week ending July 12, 2020.)	Doja Cat featuring Nicki Minaj	10	June 14	2	
June 21	"Elegí"	Rauw Alejandro, Dalex and Lenny Tavárez featuring Dimelo Flow	4	June 21	6	
June 21	"La Jeepeta (Remix)"	Nio García, Anuel AA and Myke Towers featuring Juanka and Brray	1	July 12	13	
June 28	"Relación (Remix)" (Note: The single re-entered the top ten on the week ending September 20, 2020.)	Sech, Daddy Yankee and J Balvin featuring Rosalía and Farruko (Note: Daddy Yankee and J Balvin started being credited as a co-lead artists, and Rosalía and Farruko as featured artists from the week ending September 20, 2020.)	3	July 5	23	
July 5	"El Efecto"	Rauw Alejandro and Chencho Corleone	10	July 5	1	
July 19	"Caramelo"	Ozuna, Karol G and Myke Towers (Note: Karol G and Myke Towers started being credited as a co-lead artists from the week ending September 20, 2020.)	3	September 27	18	
July 26	"TKN"	Rosalía and Travis Scott	7	July 26	4	
August 2	"Ella Dice"	Tini and Khea	4	August 2	6	
August 2	"Mamichula" ◁	Trueno and Nicki Nicole featuring Bizarrap	1	August 9	14	
August 9	"Agua"	Tainy and J Balvin	3	August 23	7	
August 23	"Ay, Dios Mío!"	Karol G	2	September 6	13	
August 30	"La Curiosidad"	Jay Wheeler, DJ Nelson and Myke Towers	9	August 30	1	
August 30	"Hawái" (Note: The single re-entered the top ten on the week ending March 21, 2021.)	Maluma and The Weeknd (Note: The Weeknd started being credited as a co-lead artist from the week ending November 15, 2020.)	1	September 6	29	
September 6	"Ayer Me Llamó Mi Ex" (Note: The single re-entered the top ten on the week ending November 22, 2020.)	Khea, Natti Natasha and Prince Royce featuring Lenny Santos (Note: Natti Natasha and Prince Royce started being credited as co-lead artists from the week ending November 24, 2020.)	5	November 22	5	
September 13	"Feel Me"	Rich Music, Dalex and Sech featuring Justin Quiles, Lenny Tavárez, Feid and Mariah	10	September 13	2	
September 20	"High (Remix)"	María Becerra, Tini and Lola Índigo	2	September 27	10	
September 20	"Papás"	Mau y Ricky	7	September 20	1	
October 4	"Jeans"	Justin Quiles	4	November 8	10	
October 4	"Dynamite"	BTS	10	October 4	1	
October 11	"Vida de Rico"	Camilo	1	November 8	20	
October 11	"Duele"	Tini featuring John C	10	October 11	1	
October 18	"La Tóxica"	Farruko	5	November 29	11	
November 8	"Bésame"	El Reja and Lira	3	November 15	12	
November 22	"Dákiti"	Bad Bunny and Jhay Cortez	1	December 6	15	
November 29	"Bichota"	Karol G	1	December 20	19	
December 6	"Chica Ideal"	Sebastián Yatra and Guaynaa	8	December 13	7	
December 13	"Nathy Peluso: Bzrp Music Sessions, Vol. 36"	Bizarrap and Nathy Peluso	4	December 13	9	

=== 2019 peaks ===
List of Billboard Hot 100 top ten singles in 2020 that peaked in 2019
Top ten entry date	Single	Artist(s)	Peak	Peak date	Weeks in top ten	Ref.
May 5	"Con Altura" (Note: The single re-entered the top ten on the week ending January 12, 2020.)	Rosalía and J Balvin featuring El Guincho	1	July 21	32	
June 2	"Soltera (Remix)" (Note: The single re-entered the top ten on the week ending November 3, 2019.) (Note: The single re-entered the top ten on the week ending January 26, 2020.)	Lunay, Daddy Yankee and Bad Bunny	3	July 28	33	
August 4	"China" (Note: The single re-entered the top ten on the week ending March 22, 2020.) ◁	Anuel AA, Karol G and Daddy Yankee featuring Ozuna and J Balvin	1	September 22	35	
September 22	"Tutu"	Camilo and Pedro Capó	1	October 27	22	
October 13	"Fresa"	Tini and Lalo Ebratt	3	November 3	15	
November 10	"Que Tire Pa Lante"	Daddy Yankee	1	November 17	33	
November 24	"Ritmo (Bad Boys for Life)" (Note: The single re-entered the top ten on the week ending May 10, 2020.) (Note: The single re-entered the top ten on the week ending May 24, 2020.)	The Black Eyed Peas and J Balvin	2	December 1	27	
December 1	"Fantasías" (Note: The single re-entered the top ten on the week ending June 21, 2020.)	Rauw Alejandro and Farruko	2	December 8	29	
December 8	"Bellaquita"	Dalex featuring Lenny Tavárez	4	December 15	17	

=== 2021 peaks ===
List of Billboard Hot 100 top ten singles in 2020 that peaked in 2021
Top ten entry date	Single	Artist(s)	Peak	Peak date	Weeks in top ten	Ref.
December 6	"Si Me Tomo Una Cerveza"	Migrantes, Oscu and Rombai featuring Agapornis and Alico (Note: Oscu, Rombai and Agapornis started being credited as a co-lead or featured artists from the week ending January 24, 2021.)	1	January 24	18	
December 27	"Bebé" (Note: The single re-entered the top ten on the week ending April 11, 2021.)	Camilo and El Alfa	4	January 24	13	

== See also ==
- List of Billboard Argentina Hot 100 number-one singles of 2020

== Notes ==
Notes for re-entries
