= Trap Cake, Vol. 2 =

EP by Rauw Alejandro
- Released: February 25, 2022
- Genre: Latin trap
- Length: 33:28
- Language: Spanish
- Label: Sony Latin; Duars

Rauw Alejandro chronology
Vice Versa (2021)	Trap Cake, Vol. 2 (2022)	Saturno (2022)

Singles from Trap Cake, Vol. 2
- 1. "Caprichoso" Released: February 7, 2022; 2. "Gracias por Nada" Released: February 24, 2022; 3. "Wuepa" Released: March 29, 2022; 4. "Museo" Released: April 11, 2022

Trap Cake, Vol. 2 is the second EP by Puerto Rican singer Rauw Alejandro. It was released on February 25, 2022, as the follow-up to his debut EP released in 2019, Trap Cake, Vol. 1. It features guest appearances from Shenseea, Future, Rvssian, Ty Dolla Sign and Ankhal.

== Singles ==
The first single from the EP "Caprichoso" was released two weeks prior to the EP's release on February 7, 2022.

The second single from the EP "Gracias por Nada" it was released on February 24, 2022, one day before the EP came out.

The third single "Wuepa" was released on March 29, 2022 along with a music video. Has the collaboration with Ankhal.

The fourth and final single from the EP "Museo" was released with a music video on April 11, 2022.

== Commercial performance ==
Trap Cake, Vol. 2 debuted at number 6 on both the US Billboard Top Latin Albums and Latin Rhythm Albums charts with 7,000 album-equivalent units.

== Track listing ==
Trap Cake, Vol. 2 track listing
No.	Title	Writer(s)	Producer(s)	Length
1.	"Museo"	Raúl Alejandro Ocasio Ruiz	Ocasio; Adrián Sánchez; Luis González; Jorge Pizarro	4:15
2.	"Caprichoso"	Ocasio; Rosalia Vila Tobella; Álvaro Díaz; Lance Shipp; Nathalia Marshall; Rachael Kennedy; Tarik Johnson	El Zorro; Rvssian	2:48
3.	"Red Velvet" (with Shenseea)	Ocasio; Andrew Green; Chinsea Lee; Díaz; Johnson	Ocasio; González; Héctor López	3:33
4.	"Fck U X2" (with Future and Rvssian)	Ocasio; Donny Flores; Green; Díaz; Jorge Pizarro; Kevin Thomas; Shipp; Marshall; Nayvadius Wilburn; Oswaldo Rangel; Kennedy	Johnson; Flores	4:40
5.	"No Drama" (with Ty Dolla Sign)	Ocasio; Tyron William Griffin Jr.; Joshua Parker	Héctor López; OG Parker	3:14
6.	"Wuepa" (with Ankhal)	Ocasio; Anthony Mercado	Ocasio; López; González; Pizarro	3:42
7.	"Gracias por Nada"	Ocasio; Díaz; Roberto Rivera Elías	El Zorro; Mr. Naisgai	3:39
8.	"GTR"	Ocasio; Díaz; José Alvarado Villa	López	3:26
9.	"Hackiao"	Ocasio	Ocasio; Pizarro; González	4:12
Total length:				33:28

== Charts ==
Weekly chart performance for Trap Cake, Vol. 2
Chart (2022)	Peak position
Spanish Albums (PROMUSICAE)	9
US Top Latin Albums (Billboard)	6
US Latin Rhythm Albums (Billboard)	6

== Certifications ==
Certifications for Trap Cake, Vol. 2
Region	Certification	Certified units/sales
Mexico (AMPROFON)	Platinum	140,000^{‡}
^{‡} Sales+streaming figures based on certification alone.
