= Afrodisíaco =

2020 studio album by Rauw Alejandro

Studio album by Rauw Alejandro
- Released: November 13, 2020
- Studios: Arthouse, Miami, Florida; Criteria, Miami, Florida; Duars, Miami, Florida; Sensei Sound, Carolina, Puerto Rico
- Genres: Reggaeton; Latin trap; Latin R&B; electronic
- Length: 61:04
- Language: Spanish
- Labels: Sony Latin; Duars
- Producers: Rauw Alejandro; Eydren con el Ritmo; Caleb Calloway; Kenobi; Colla; Rosalía; Sky Rompiendo; Dímelo Flow; The Martinez Brothers; Mr. NaisGai; Yampi; Nesty; Álex Gárgolas; Tainy; Sinatra; Maiky; Maya; Elektrik; Miky; Honeyboos

Rauw Alejandro chronology
Trap Cake, Vol. 1 (2019)	Afrodisíaco (2020)	Vice Versa (2021)

Singles from Afrodisíaco
- 1. "Tattoo (remix)" Released: July 9, 2020; 2. "Elegí (remix)" Released: August 27, 2020; 3. "Enchule" Released: September 17, 2020; 4. "Reloj" Released: October 22, 2020; 5. "De Cora <3" Released: November 12, 2020; 6. "Dile a Él" Released: February 3, 2021

Afrodisíaco (transl. Aphrodisiac) is the debut studio album by Puerto Rican singer Rauw Alejandro. It was released on November 13, 2020, by Sony Music Latin and Duars Entertainment. After releasing several projects including a mixtape, an extended play, and many singles since 2016, Alejandro finally announced recording his debut studio album in early 2020. He worked with several producers, including Caleb Calloway, Mr. Naisgai, Dímelo Flow, Eydren con el Ritmo, and Tainy to create the album. Musically, Afrodisíaco consists of traditional reggaeton tracks, Latin trap songs, Latin R&B numbers, electronic elements, and perreo rhythms. After his sophomore album's release, Alejandro embarked on the Rauw Alejandro World Tour in 2021 to promote both albums.

The album was supported by six singles: "Tattoo" (remix), "Elegí" (remix), "Enchule", "Reloj", "De Cora <3", and "Dile a Él". The global hit "Tattoo" (remix) topped the charts in nine countries and reached the top 10 on Billboard's Hot Latin Songs in the United States. The song won the award for Best Urban Fusion/Performance at the 22nd Annual Latin Grammy Awards. "Reloj" reached the top 10 on the Hot Latin Songs, while "De Cora <3" peaked at number one in four countries.

Afrodisíaco received generally favorable reviews from music critics, who complimented its production and the singer's versatility. It was nominated for Best Música Urbana Album at the 64th Annual Grammy Awards. The album was a commercial success. It debuted at number three on both the US Top Latin Albums and Latin Rhythm Albums with first-week sales of 12,000 units, and became Alejandro's first entry on Billboard 200. Additionally, it debuted at number two in Spain. The album has received several certifications, including sextuple platinum (Latin) in the United States.

== Background and recording ==
Rauw Alejandro began his musical career in 2014, uploading Latin R&B songs to SoundCloud. In 2016, he released his mixtape, Punto de Equilibrio, which led him a contract with Duars Entertainment. Three years later, he launched his debut extended play, Trap Cake, Vol. 1, on which he fused Latin R&B with Latin trap. After releasing several projects and many singles, he finally announced that he was working on his debut studio album in February 2020, revealing its title as Afrodisíaco, which translates to Aphrodisiac in English. During an interview with MTV News, he talked about the album's title:

My music is porn for your ears. My music is pleasure for you. That's the vision of the album. Rauw Alejandro is the aphrodisiac. The album makes you feel good. It makes you feel better. It puts you in every mood. We got a lot of reggaetón and sexy songs, too.

On November 5, 2020, Alejandro deleted all of his posts on social media and left only one photo, with the caption "Afrodisíaco comes out in a few days, while I go to rest a bit. I love you." Four days later, he revealed the album's release date, cover art, and track list, confirming that it would be released on November 13, 2020. In an interview with Los 40, he described the album as "a very complete and versatile album" and stated that he had been able to find himself "musically as an artist". He worked on Afrodisíaco with the assistance of several producers, including Caleb Calloway, Mr. Naisgai, Dímelo Flow, Eydren con el Ritmo, and Tainy, and recorded it in studios across Miami and Carolina.

== Music and lyrics ==
Afrodisíaco is a Spanish language album composed of 16 songs, consisting traditional reggaeton tracks, Latin trap songs, Latin R&B numbers, electronic elements, and perreo rhythms. Lyrically, "about 90%" of it is about Alejandro himself, and he tries to "be in everyone's shoes" when he is writing, adding his own experience. The album's opener "Dile a Él" (transl. "Tell Him") is a mid-tempo "dark" reggaeton ballad, with a down-tempo "slightly darker" outro, that addresses the singer's ex-girlfriend who has broken up with him to be with another man. It features uncredited background vocals by Spanish singer Rosalía. "Strawberry Kiwi" has a "summery, tropical atmosphere", while "Mood" is an urban song and a collaboration with Panamanian singer Sech. The fourth track off Afrodisíaco, "Química" (transl. "Chemistry") begins as an upbeat reggaeton featuring Puerto Rican duo Zion & Lennox. However, it shifts into a house track with sudden flashes of high-definition house with the assistance of the Martinez Brothers.

"Soy una Gárgola"
A 24-second sample of the chorus of "Soy una Gárgola", which is a re-make of Randy's 2006 reggaeton hit track with an electronic update.

"Enchule" was noted by the media for being different with Alejandro's usual reggaeton aesthetic and is a pop song, in which Alejandro expresses the feelings of the person on the stage where he know he has fallen in love. The word "Enchule" is a Puerto Rican slang for a romantic obsession. A collaboration with Colombian singer J Balvin, "De Cora <3" (transl. "From Heart") is an urbano romantic song about living with a young woman in a beautiful home, expressing the feelings of someone who still misses his partner. It talks about how you can wish your ex-partner the best, even if you are no longer with her. The hip-hop crossover "Un Sueño" (transl. "A Dream") features vocals by American rapper Trippie Redd and has a dancehall vibe. A collaboration with Puerto Rican rapper Anuel AA, "Reloj" (transl. "Clock") is a melodic reggaeton song with urban rhythms, about the sexual desire they feel towards a girl, describing everything they would do to her if the clock had more hours. On "No Te Creo" (transl. "I Don't Believe You"), Alejandro collaborated with Puerto Rican duo Wisin & Yandel, while "Soy una Gárgola" (transl. "I Am a Gargoyle") is a re-make of Randy's 2006 reggaeton hit track. The new version features Randy himself and American rapper Arcángel, and has been described as an "electronic update". Arcángel labels himself an "original gargoyle" on the song and Alejandro has added a new Latin R&B verse about "making women around the world move to the song".

"Pensándote" (transl. "Thinking of You") is a mid-tempo track with the assistance of Tainy, while "Perreo Pesau'" is a mid-tempo reggaeton song, and a tribute to early-2000s reggaeton. A contemporary pop and electronic house song, "Algo Mágico" (transl. "Something Magical") features elements of Latin trap, reggaeton, dance, pop-R&B, synth-pop, house, and urbano music. "Ponte Pa' Mí" (transl. "Put on for Me") is a sensual dancehall and modern reggaeton song that hints at an intimate and romantic situation. It express the feelings of someone who is anticipating "a return that may never happen". The two last tracks off the album "Elegí" (remix) and "Tattoo" (remix) are remix versions of Alejandro's non-album hit singles. The former is a reggaeton song, with elements of Latin R&B and electronic music, about two people who have intense sexual chemistry and reconnect after having the "best night ever". The original version of "Elegí" is a collaboration between Alejandro, Dalex and Lenny Tavárez featuring Dímelo Flow, and the remix version also features Farruko, Anuel AA, Sech, and Justin Quiles. Anuel AA's verse references his 2018 song "Amanece". "Tattoo" is a reggaeton and pop urban song, with a danceable rhythm that portrays the full happiness of falling in love with a person. Colombian singer Camilo joined Alejandro on the remix, which features elements of pop and urban. It is about falling in love with a girl who has the singers "wrapped around her finger", the way "Camilo is willing to get her name tattooed".

== Singles ==
"Tattoo" (remix) serves as the lead single of Afrodisíaco. It was accompanied by a music video posted to YouTube, directed by Gustavo Camacho. Both were released on July 9, 2020. It became a global hit, reaching number one in Argentina, Colombia, Costa Rica, El Salvador, Guatemala, Honduras, Latin America, Panama, Peru, and Puerto Rico, as well as the top five in several other countries such as Mexico and Spain. On Billboard's Hot Latin Songs in the United States, the song peaked at number seven, giving Alejandro his first ever top-10 hit on the chart. It also reached the summit of the Latin Airplay and Latin Rhythm Airplay charts, and won the award for Best Urban Fusion/Performance at the 22nd Annual Latin Grammy Awards. The second single from Afrodisíaco, "Elegí" (remix) was released on August 27, 2020, accompanied by a Camacho directed music video.

"Enchule" was released for digital download and streaming on September 17, 2020, as the third single from the album, while its music video was directed by Camacho. The song reached the top 10 in Dominican Republic and Spain, and was certified platinum in the latter. "Reloj" was launched on October 22, 2020, as the fourth single off the album, accompanied by a Camacho directed music video. The track reached the top 10 in Colombia, Dominican Republic, El Salvador, Guatemala, Honduras, Mexico, and Peru, and on US Hot Latin Songs. The fifth single from Afrodisíaco, "De Cora <3" was released on November 12, 2020, accompanied by a Camacho directed music video. It peaked number one in El Salvador, Honduras, Panama, and Puerto Rico. The album's final single, "Dile a Él" was issued to radio stations on February 3, 2021, while its music video was directed by Alfred Marroquín.

The album was also supported by three promotional singles; "Ponte Pa' Mí", "Algo Mágico", and "Perreo Pesau'" were released on April 16, 2020, June 25, 2020, and March 5, 2021, respectively.

=== Other charted and certified songs ===
Following the release of Afrodisíaco, "Soy una Gárgola" and "Química" debuted at numbers 66 and 88 in Spain, respectively. In 2022, both "Soy una Gárgola" and "Mood" were certified platinum in Colombia. In 2024, "Pensándote" was certified gold by the Productores de Música de España (PROMUSICAE), for track-equivalent sales of over 30,000 units in Spain.

== Marketing ==
=== Release ===
Afrodisíaco was released for digital download and streaming by Sony Music Latin and Duars Entertainment on November 13, 2020. CDs of the album were released to retail on December 18, 2020.

=== Live performances ===
To further promote Afrodisíaco and Vice Versa (2021), Alejandro embarked on the Rauw Alejandro World Tour. It began on July 15, 2021, at the Enigma Night Club in Raleigh, North Carolina, and concluded on December 18, 2021, at the Fair Expo Center in Miami, with concerts throughout the United States, Mexico, Spain, Puerto Rico, and Dominican Republic. In addition to his tour, Alejandro and Balvin performed "De Cora <3" on The Late Late Show with James Corden on November 23, 2020.

== Critical reception ==
Professional ratings
Review scores
Source	Rating
AllMusic	3.5/5 stars

Afrodisíaco received generally favorable reviews from music critics. Thom Jurek from AllMusic noted "a pronounced and consistent vibe" on the album that "juxtaposes elegantly layered atmospherics and innovative beats against catchy melodies set in middling tempos". He praised the production that is "carefully articulated to underscore the painstaking detail applied to the sequencing of exceptionally well-written songs" and thought the album delivers "a rich and seamless listening experience". He also highlighted multiple tracks, including "Soy una Gárgola" as the "biggest surprise" of the album, writing that is "complete with an array of imaginative 21st century beats and sonics", while describing both "Mood" and "Un Sueño" as seductive and "Tattoo" (remix) as steamy.

In her review of the album for Grammy.com, Ecleen Luzmila Caraballo named Alejandro "one of the most promising well-rounded acts of his generation", saying his fusion of genres sets him "apart from his peers". She described the album as "valiant" and "versatile", highlighting "Química", and "Algo Mágico" as the standouts from the album. Los Angeles Times critic Suzy Exposito labeled the album "a sensuous night cruise" for its use of multiple genres, and Isabela Raygoza of Rolling Stone called the set "salacious and club-ready". People's Tomás Mier thought Afrodisíaco is "everything an artist just two years into his career could ask for" and named Alejandro "the future of reggaetón". Writing for MTV News, Lucas Villa stated that the singer's "talent is easy to spot" on the album, while praising its "impressive roster of guests".

=== Accolades ===
Afrodisíaco was nominated for Latin Album at the 2020 Premios Lo Más Escuchado, and Favorite Album – Latin at the 2021 American Music Awards. The album was also nominated for Best Música Urbana Album at the 64th Annual Grammy Awards, earning Alejandro his first Grammy nomination.

== Commercial performance ==
Afrodisíaco debuted at number three on both the US Top Latin Albums and Latin Rhythm Albums charts with first-week sales of 12,000 units, according to data compiled by Nielsen SoundScan for the chart dated November 28, 2020. It became Alejandro's second top-10 project on Top Latin Albums and his highest peak in his career, surpassing his live album Concierto Virtual en Tiempos de COVID-19 Desde el Coliseo de Puerto Rico (Vivo) (2020), which peaked at number 10 on September 12, 2020. Afrodisíaco has since become the singer's longest-charting album on the Top Latin Albums, spending 120 weeks on the chart as of March 2023. The album also debuted at number 75 on the US Billboard 200, becoming the Alejandro's second entry on the chart. On Rolling Stone Top 200, the set debuted and peaked at number 77. It was certified sextuple platinum (Latin) by the Recording Industry Association of America (RIAA), for sales of over 360,000 units in the United States. In Spain, the album debuted at number one on November 22, 2020, becoming Alejandro's first entry on the country's albums chart. It was later certified platinum by the Productores de Música de España (PROMUSICAE), for selling over 40,000 units in the country.

== Track listing ==
Track listing adapted from Tidal.

Afrodisíaco track listing
No.	Title	Writer(s)	Producer(s)	Length
1.	"Dile a Él"	Raúl Alejandro Ocasio Ruiz "Rauw Alejandro"	Eydren con el Ritmo; Raúl Ocasio "El Zorro"; Rosalía; Caleb Calloway	3:29
2.	"Strawberry Kiwi"	Alejandro; Rosalía Vila Tobella; Alejandro Ramírez "Sky"; José M. Collazo; Jorge E. Pizarro "Kenobi"; Eric Pérez Rovira "Eric Duras"	Sky Rompiendo; El Zorro	3:32
3.	"Mood" (with Sech)	Alejandro; Carlos Isaías Morales Williams "Sech"; Collazo; Jorge Valdés Vásquez "Dímelo Flow"; Hector C. López "Caleb Calloway"; Kenobi; Duars; David Alberto Díaz Roja	Dímelo Flow; El Zorro; Caleb Calloway	2:56
4.	"Química" (with Zion & Lennox and Mr. NaisGai featuring the Martinez Brothers)	Gabriel Pizarro "Lennox"; Calloway; Kenobi; Colla; Duars; Christian Martinez "The Martinez Brothers"; Steve Martinez Jr. "The Martinez Brothers"; Alejandro; Luis J. González "Mr. NaisGai"; Christian Mojica "Cauty"; Félix Ortiz Torres "Zion"	Kenobi; El Zorro; Calloway; Mr. Naisgai; The Martinez Brothers	4:55
5.	"Enchule"	Alejandro	Mr. NaisGai; Eydren con el Ritmo	3:05
6.	"De Cora <3" (with J Balvin)	Alejandro; Calloway; Colla; Duars; Angel Ruben Díaz "D'Alexis"; José Álvaro Osorio Balvin "J Balvin"	Calloway; El Zorro	3:10
7.	"Un Sueño" (featuring Trippie Redd)	Michael Lamar White II "Trippie Redd"; Alejandro; Jean Pierre Soto "Yampi"; Kenobi; Colla; Duars; Mr. Naisgai	Mr. Naisgai; Yampi	3:42
8.	"Reloj" (with Anuel AA)	Alejandro; Yampi; Ernesto Padilla "Nesty"; Emmanuel Gazmey "Anuel AA"; Calloway; Kenobi; Colla; Duars	Calloway; Nesty	3:51
9.	"No Te Creo" (with Wisin & Yandel and Mr. NaisGai)	Alejandro; Juan Luis Morera Luna "Wisin"; Llandel Veguilla Malavé "Yandel"; Kenobi; Colla; Duars; Mr. NaisGai	Mr. NaisGai; El Zorro	3:49
10.	"Soy una Gárgola" (with Arcángel and Randy)	Calloway; Austin Santos "Arcángel"; David Torres Castro; Mervin Maldonado Arce; Kenobi; Colla; Duars; Randy Ortiz Acevedo "Randy"; Giann Arias Colón "DJ Giann"; Miguel Antonio de Jesús Cruz "Guelo Star"; Rafael Quiles Hernández "Álex Gárgolas"; Alejandro	El Zorro; Calloway; Álex Gárgolas	4:09
11.	"Pensándote" (with Tainy)	Alejandro; Marco Masis "Tainy"; Colla; Duars; Jorge Álvaro Díaz "Álvarito"	Tainy	3:36
12.	"Perreo Pesau'"	Alejandro; Ramón Ayala; Kenobi; Colla; Duars; Mr. Naisgai; Roberto Rafael Rivera Elias "Yensanjuan"; Díaz	Mr. NaisGai; El Zorro; Calloway	4:20
13.	"Algo Mágico"	Mr. NaisGai; Alejandro; Jesus D. Valencia; Stiven Rojas "Miky"; Juan Luis Cardona "Maiky"; Michael Sánchez "Elektrik"; Julian Yepez "Maya"; Juan José Duque "Sinatra"; Colla; Duars	Elektrik; Mr. Naisgai; Maya; Sinatra; Miky; Maiky; Calloway	4:21
14.	"Ponte Pa' Mí" (with Myke Towers and Sky Rompiendo)	Alejandro; Sky; Orlando J. Cepeda; José M. Reyes Díaz; Michael Torres "Myke Towers"; Colla; Duars	Sky Rompiendo	3:04
15.	"Elegí" (remix; with Dalex and Lenny Tavárez featuring Farruko, Anuel AA, Sech, Dímelo Flow and Justin Quiles)	Duars; Joshua Javier Méndez; Pedro David Daleccio Jr. "Dalex"; Ramsés Iván Herrera Soto "BCA"; Jorge Valdés Vázquez "Dímelo Flow"; Anuel AA; Julio Manuel González Tavares "Lenny Tavárez"; Miguel Andres Martínez Perea "Slow Mike"; Andy Bauza; Carlos Efrén Reyes Rosado "Farruko"; Cristian Andrés Salazar; Franklin Jovani Martinez; Isac Ortiz; Justin Rafael Quiles; Alejandro; Sech	Dímelo Flow	5:23
16.	"Tattoo" (remix; with Camilo)	Alejandro; Rafa Rodriguez "Honeyboos"; Evaluna Montaner; Camilo Echeverry; Andrea Mangiamarchi "Elena Rose"; Daniel Rondon "Honeyboos"; Colla; Duars; Mr. NaisGai	Honeyboos; Mr. NaisGai	3:42
Total length:				61:04

=== Notes ===
- "Dile a Él" includes uncredited vocals by Rosalía.

== Personnel ==
Credits for Afrodisíaco adapted from Tidal and AllMusic.

=== Recording locations ===
- Arthouse, Miami, Florida
- Criteria Studios, Miami, Florida
- Duars Music Studio, Miami, Florida
- Sensei Sound, Carolina, Puerto Rico

=== Musicians and technical ===
- Rauw Alejandro – vocals (all tracks), production (tracks 1, 2, 3, 4, 6, 9, 10, 12), songwriting (all tracks)
- Adrián Sánchez "Eydren con el Ritmo" – production (tracks 1, 5)
- Eric Pérez Rovira "Eric Duars" – songwriting (all tracks except 1, 5, 16), executive producer (all tracks)
- Héctor C. López "Caleb Calloway" – production (tracks 1, 3, 4, 6, 8, 10, 12), songwriting (tracks 3, 4, 6, 8, 10)
- Jorge E. Pizarro "Kenobi" – songwriting (tracks 2, 3, 4, 5, 7, 8, 9, 10, 12), recording engineer (tracks 1, 2, 3, 4, 5, 6, 7, 8, 9, 10, 11, 12, 14), production (track 4)
- José M. Collazo "Colla" – songwriting (tracks 2, 3, 6, 8, 9, 10, 11, 12, 13, 14), mastering engineer (all tracks except 15), mixing engineer (all tracks except 15), recording engineer (tracks 13, 16)
- Rosalía Vila Tobella – production (track 1), songwriting (track 2)
- Sky Rompiendo – production (2, 14), songwriting (2, 14)
- Sech – vocals (tracks 3, 15), songwriting (tracks 3, 15)
- David Alberto Díaz Rojas – songwriting (track 3)
- Dímelo Flow – production (tracks 3, 15), songwriting (tracks 3, 15), recording engineer (tracks 3, 15), mixing engineer (track 15)
- The Martinez Brothers – production (track 4), songwriting (track 4)
- Christian Mojica "Cauty" – songwriting (track 4)
- Zion & Lennox – vocals (track 4), songwriting (track 4)
- Luis J. González "Mr. NaisGai" – production (tracks 4, 5, 7, 9, 12, 13, 16), songwriting (tracks 4, 7, 9, 12, 13, 16), mixing engineer (track 13), performance arranger (track 13), piano (tracks 13, 16)
- Angel Ruben Díaz "D'Alexis" – songwriting (track 6)
- J Balvin – vocals (track 6), songwriting (track 6)
- Jean Pierre Soto "Yampi" – production (track 7), songwriting (tracks 7, 8)
- Trippie Redd – vocals (track 7), songwriting (track 7)
- Anuel AA – vocals (tracks 8, 15), songwriting (tracks 8, 15)
- Ernesto Padilla "Nesty" – production (track 8), songwriting (track 8)
- Luis Guillermo Marval Camero – songwriting (track 8)
- Wisin & Yandel – vocals (track 9), songwriting (track 9)
- Victor Torres – recording engineer (track 9)
- Arcángel – vocals (track 10), songwriting (track 10)
- Miguel Antonio de Jesús Cruz "Guelo Star" – songwriting (track 10)
- Randy Ortiz Acevedo "Randy" – vocals (track 10), songwriting (track 10)
- Rafael Quiles Hernández "Álex Gárgolas" – production (track 10), songwriting (track 10)
- Giann Arias Colón "DJ Giann" – songwriting (track 10)
- David Torres Castro – songwriting (track 10)
- Mervin Maldonado Arce – songwriting (track 10)
- Jorge Álvaro Díaz "Álvarito" – songwriter (tracks 11, 12)
- Marco Masis "Tainy" – production (track 11), songwriting (track 11)
- Daddy Yankee – songwriting (track 12)
- Roberto Rafael Rivera Elias "Yensanjuan" – songwriting (track 12)
- Jesús D. Valencia – songwriting (track 13)
- Juan José Duque "Sinatra" – production (track 13), songwriting (track 13)
- Juan Luis Cardona "Maiky" – production (track 13), songwriting (track 13)
- Julian Yepez "Maya" – production (track 13), songwriting (track 13)
- Michael Sánchez "Elektrik" – production (track 13), songwriting (track 13)
- Stiven Rojas "Miky" – production (track 13), songwriting (track 13)
- Myke Towers – vocals (track 14), songwriting (track 14)
- Orlando J. Cepeda – songwriting (track 14)
- José M. Reyes Díaz – songwriting (track 14)
- Andy Bauza – songwriting (track 15)
- Farruko – vocals (track 15), songwriting (track 15)
- Franklin Jovani Martinez – songwriting (track 15)
- Lenny Tavárez – vocals (track 15), songwriting (track 15)
- Justin Quiles – vocals (track 15), songwriting (track 15)
- Miguel Andres Martínez Perea "Slow Mike" – songwriting (track 15)
- Dalex – vocals (track 15), songwriting (track 15)
- Ramsés Iván Herrera Soto "BAC" – songwriting (track 15)
- Isaac Ortiz – songwriting (track 15)
- Cristián Andrés Salazar – songwriting (track 15)
- Joshua Javier Méndez – songwriting (track 15)
- Mike Fuller – mastering engineer (track 15)
- Andrea Elena Mangiamarchi "Elena Rose" – songwriting (track 16)
- Camilo Echeverry – vocals (track 16), songwriting (track 16)
- Evaluna Montaner – songwriting (track 16)
- Honeyboos – production (track 16), songwriting (track 16)
- Nicolas Ramirez – recording engineer (track 16)

== Charts ==
=== Weekly charts ===
Weekly chart performance for Afrodisíaco
Chart (2020–2024)	Peak position
Spanish Albums (Promusicae)	2
US Billboard 200	75
US Latin Rhythm Albums (Billboard)	3
US Top Latin Albums (Billboard)	3
US Rolling Stone Top 200	77

=== Year-end charts ===
2020 year-end chart performance for Afrodisíaco
Chart (2020)	Position
Spanish Albums (PROMUSICAE)	43

2021 year-end chart performance for Afrodisíaco
Chart (2021)	Position
Spanish Albums (PROMUSICAE)	10
US Latin Rhythm Albums (Billboard)	5
US Top Latin Albums (Billboard)	7

2022 year-end chart performance for Afrodisíaco
Chart (2022)	Position
Spanish Albums (PROMUSICAE)	33
US Latin Rhythm Albums (Billboard)	10
US Top Latin Albums (Billboard)	13

2023 year-end chart performance for Afrodisíaco
Chart (2023)	Position
Spanish Albums (PROMUSICAE)	68

== Certifications ==
Certifications and sales for Afrodisíaco
Region	Certification	Certified units/sales
Argentina (CAPIF)	3× Platinum	
Colombia	8× Platinum	
Mexico (AMPROFON)	3× Platinum	420,000^{‡}
Peru	Platinum	
Spain (Promusicae)	Platinum	40,000^{‡}
United States (RIAA)	11× Platinum (Latin)	660,000^{‡}
Streaming
Central America (CFC)	Platinum	7,000,000^{†}
^{‡} Sales+streaming figures based on certification alone.^{†} Streaming-only figures based on certification alone.
