= Tattoo (Rauw Alejandro song) =

2020 single by Rauw Alejandro

Single by Rauw Alejandro
- Language: Spanish
- Released: February 12, 2020
- Genre: Reggaeton; pop
- Length: 3:22
- Label: Duars
- Songwriters: Andrea Mangiamarchi; Daniel Rondon; Eric Pérez; José M. Collazo; Luis J. González; Rafa Rodriguez; Raúl A. Ocasio "Rauw Alejandro"
- Producers: Luis J. González "Mr. NaisGai"; Daniel Rondon; Rafa Rodriguez

Rauw Alejandro singles chronology
"Infiel" (2019)	"Tattoo" (2020)	"TBT" (2020)

Music video
- "Tattoo" on YouTube

"Tattoo" is a song recorded by Puerto Rican singer Rauw Alejandro. It was written by Elena Rose, Daniel Rondon, Eric Duars, Colla, Mr. NaisGai, Rafa Rodriguez, and Alejandro, while the production was handled by Mr. NaisGai, Rondon, and Rodriguez. The song was released for digital download and streaming as a single by Duars Entertainment on February 12, 2020. A Spanish language reggaeton and pop urban song with a danceable rhythm, it portrays the full happiness of falling in love with a person. The song experienced commercial success in Spanish-language markets, reaching number one in Colombia, and the top-five in Argentina and Spain. It has received several certifications, including Latin quadruple platinum in the United States. An accompanying music video, released simultaneously with the song, was directed by Marlon Peña.

A remix of "Tattoo" with Colombian singer Camilo was released on July 9, 2020, as the lead single from Alejandro's debut studio album Afrodisíaco (2020). Featuring elements of pop and urban, it is about falling in love with a girl who has the singers "wrapped around her finger", the way "Camilo is willing to get her name tattooed". The track received widely positive reviews from music critics, who complimented its lyrics. It won the award for Best Urban Fusion/Performance at the 22nd Annual Latin Grammy Awards. The track was ranked among the 25 Best Latin Songs of 2020 by Billboard.

The remix was commercially successful, reaching number one in nine countries, including Argentina and Colombia, as well as the top five in several other countries such as Mexico and Spain. On Billboard's Hot Latin Songs in the United States, the song peaked at number seven, giving both singers their first ever top-10 hit on the chart. It also reached the summit of the Latin Airplay and Latin Rhythm Airplay charts, and has received several certifications, including diamond in Mexico and quintuple platinum in Spain. The accompanying music video for "Tattoo Remix", released simultaneously with the song, was filmed in Miami and directed by Gustavo Camacho. It depicts Alejandro and Camilo having an epic beach day and having fun with some tricycles along with their friends.

== Background and composition ==
"Tattoo"
A 20-second sample of the chorus, which features a danceable rhythm

"Tattoo" was written by Elena Rose, Daniel Rondon, Eric Duars, Colla, Mr. NaisGai, Rafa Rodriguez, and Rauw Alejandro, and produced by Mr. NaisGai, Rondon, and Rodriguez for Alejandro's first studio album, Afrodisíaco. The track is a Spanish language reggaeton and pop urban song, with a danceable rhythm, portrays the full happiness of falling in love with a person. Alejandro explained about its rhythm and lyrics:

"Tattoo" is a theme with a very different and fresh rhythm, the lyrics are special to dedicate to that person who has been marked by you and does not leave your mind. It reminds me a lot of the 'puppy love' stage, which is one of the funniest. Not everyone can maintain that.

The track runs for a total of 3 minutes and 22 seconds, and its "romantic" and "sensual" lyrics include, "Yo no se ni que hacer / Cuando estoy cerca de ti / Tus ojos color café / Se apoderaron de mi / Muero por un beso / De esos que no son de amigos" (I don't even know what to do / when I'm close to you / Your brown eyes / They took over me / I would die for a kiss / Of those that are not from friends).

== Release and promotion ==
A screenshot from the music video, depicting Alejandro and a woman standing in front of each other and looking at each other romantically

"Tattoo" was released for digital download and streaming as a single by Duars Entertainment on February 12, 2020. To promote the song, Alejandro went on the cover of "¡Viva Latino!" playlist on Spotify, while the track was also placed on "Dale Play!" playlist on Apple Music. An accompanying music video was released simultaneously with the song. The visual was directed by Marlon Peña and produced by Marlon Films. It depicts Alejandro in "an atmosphere full of romance with his partner". On March 28, 2020, he gave his first live performance of "Tattoo" at the Coca-Cola Music Hall. The track was also included on the set lists for Alejandro's the Rauw Alejandro World Tour and the Vice Versa Tour.

== Reception ==
Griselda Flores from Billboard gave "Tattoo" a positive review, calling the song "great". The track debuted at number 50 on the US Billboard Hot Latin Songs chart on May 2, 2020, becoming Alejandro's sixth entry. On July 18, 2020, the song re-entered the chart at the new peak of number 47. In October 2021, it was certified quadruple platinum (Latin) by the Recording Industry Association of America (RIAA), for track-equivalent sales of over 240,000 units in the United States. In Argentina, "Tattoo" debuted at number 91 on the Argentina Hot 100 on the chart issue dated March 7, 2020, becoming Alejandro's eighth entry. The following week, it climbed to number 69. On July 19, 2020, the track reached the top-five for the first time. It was certified gold in the country, for selling 10,000 copies. The song was also certified 3× Platinum+Gold by the Asociación Mexicana de Productores de Fonogramas y Videogramas (AMPROFON), for track-equivalent sales of over 210,000 units in Mexico, and peaked at number six on AMPROFON's Mexico Streaming chart. "Tattoo" reached number one in Colombia on July 10, 2020. In Spain's official weekly chart, the song debuted at number 17 on February 23, 2020. The following week, it climbed to its peak at number three, giving Alejandro his highest peak in his career at the time, surpassing "Fantasías", which peaked at number four in November 2019. "Tattoo" was later certified double platinum by the Productores de Música de España (PROMUSICAE), for track-equivalent sales of over 80,000 units in the country.

== Remix ==
"Tattoo Remix"

Single by Rauw Alejandro and Camilo

from the album Afrodisíaco
- Language: Spanish
- Released: July 9, 2020
- Genre: Pop
- Length: 3:42
- Label: Sony Latin; Duars
- Songwriters: Raúl A. Ocasio "Rauw Alejandro"; Rafa Rodriguez; Evaluna Montaner; Camilo Echeverry; Andrea Mangiamarchi "Elena Rose"; Daniel Rondon; José M. Collazo "Colla"; Eric Pérez "Eric Duars"; Luis J. González "Mr. NaisGai"
- Producers: Daniel Rondon; Luis J. González "Mr. NaisGai"; Rafa Rodriguez

Camilo singles chronology
"El Mismo Aire" (2020)	"Tattoo Remix" (2020)	"Despeinada" (2020)

Music video
- "Tattoo Remix" on YouTube

On July 9, 2020, Alejandro released a remix of "Tattoo", with Colombian singer Camilo, as the lead single from his debut studio album Afrodisíaco. It marked the first collaboration between the two singers. Evaluna Montaner and Camilo joined the original version's lyricists to write the remix version. The version features elements of pop and urban, and runs for a total of 3 minutes and 42 seconds. It is about falling in love with a girl who has the singers "wrapped around her finger", the way "Camilo is willing to get her name tattooed".

=== Critical reception ===
Upon release, "Tattoo Remix" was met with widely positive reviews from music critics. In her review for Billboard, Leila Cobo described its lyrics as "raunchy" and "graphic", comparing the song with "a breath of fresh air". She labeled it "[a] feel-good summer song that everybody would be dancing outside to, if only there was an outside". Also from Billboard, Griselda Flores stated that Camilo took "the already great" song "to the next level with his distinctive poetic lyrics and ever-so-soothing vocals". She continued praising the song as "pure bliss, with catchy and innocent lyrics". Billboard Argentina's Florence Mauro praised the remix for "its new melodies that give it fresh and innovative touches", while an author of Los 40 named it a "musical phenomenon". In 2022, Ernesto Lechner from Rolling Stone ranked the track as Alejandro's eighth-best song, saying it "shows the ease with which Rauw could have triumphed in Latin pop, if he so desired".

=== Accolades ===
Billboard ranked "Tattoo Remix" among the 25 Best Latin Songs of 2020, as well as the 20 Best Latin Summer Songs of the year. The track has received a number of awards and nominations. It won the award for Best Urban Fusion/Performance at the 22nd Annual Latin Grammy Awards.

Awards and nominations for "Tattoo Remix"
Organization	Year	Award	Result	Ref.
Latin Music Official Italian Awards	2020	Best Latin Remix	Won	
Latin Music Official Italian Awards	2020	Best Latin Collaboration	Nominated	
Latin Music Official Italian Awards	2020	Best Latin Male Video	Nominated	
LOS40 Music Awards	2020	Best Song – Latin	Nominated	
Nickelodeon Mexico Kids' Choice Awards	2020	Latin Hit	Nominated	
Premios DeGira	2020	Best Song in Spanish	Nominated	
Premios Lo Más Escuchado	2020	Urban Song	Nominated	
Premios Quiero	2020	Best Urban Video	Nominated	
ASCAP Latin Awards	2021	Winning Song	Won	
Latin Grammy Awards	2021	Best Urban Fusion/Performance	Won	
Latino Music Awards	2021	Best Urban Song	Nominated	
Latino Music Awards	2021	Music Video of the Year	Nominated	
Premios Lo Nuestro	2021	Remix of the Year	Nominated	

=== Commercial performance ===
"Tattoo Remix" became a global hit, peaking at numbers 28 and 18 on the Billboard Global 200 and Billboard Global Excl. US charts, respectively. The song's success was further solidified with a viral TikTok dance challenge which featured the song and was used in over 2.8 million videos. In the United States, where the original version of "Tattoo" was already charting on the Billboard Hot Latin Songs chart, it climbed to number 12 on the chart issue dated July 25, 2020, following the release of the remix. Thus, it marked Camilo's highest charting song in his career, surpassing "Tutu", which peaked at number 16 on November 2, 2019. "Tattoo Remix" subsequently peaked at number seven on the Hot Latin Songs on September 12, 2020, giving both Alejandro and Camilo their first ever top-10 hit. It also peaked at number one on both the Latin Airplay and Latin Rhythm Airplay charts, and number four on Latin Digital Song Sales.

In Spain's official weekly chart, "Tattoo Remix" debuted at number 14 on July 19, 2020. It subsequently peaked at number two on the chart on August 16, 2020, being held off the top spot by "Mamichula" (2020) by Trueno, Nicki Nicole, and Bizarrap. It marked Camilo's first and only top-three hit in the country, and Alejandro's second. The track was later certified quintuple platinum by the Productores de Música de España (PROMUSICAE), for track-equivalent sales of over 200,000 units in the country. In Latin America, "Tattoo Remix" experienced huge commercial success, reaching number one in Argentina, Colombia, Costa Rica, El Salvador, Guatemala, Honduras, Latin America, Panama, Peru, and Puerto Rico. On Billboard Argentina Hot 100, it holds the record as the song with the longest climb to number one, reaching number one on its 21st week. The track also peaked in the top five of Bolivia, Chile, Dominican Republic, Ecuador, Mexico, Nicaragua, Paraguay, Uruguay, and Venezuela. In Mexico, the song was certified diamond + 3× platinum + gold by the Asociación Mexicana de Productores de Fonogramas y Videogramas (AMPROFON), for track-equivalent sales of over 510,000 units. It was also certified gold by Pro-Música Brasil for track-equivalent sales of over 20,000 units in Brazil.

=== Music video ===
A screenshot from the music video, depicting Alejandro and Camilo riding tricycles

An accompanying music video was released simultaneously with the song. The visual was directed by Gustavo Camacho, produced by Mastermind Entertainment, and filmed in Miami. It depicts Alejandro and Camilo having an "epic beach day" and having fun with some tricycles along with their friends, including Camilo's partner Evaluna Montaner and the Argentine actress Stefania Roitman.

== Track listings ==
Digital download / streaming
No.	Title	Length
1.	"Tattoo"	3:22

Digital download / streaming
No.	Title	Length
1.	"Tattoo (Remix with Camilo)"	3:42

== Credits and personnel ==
Credits adapted from Spotify and Tidal.

- Rauw Alejandro – associated performer, composer, lyricist
- Camilo – additional associated performer, composer, lyricist for the remix version
- Daniel Rondon – composer, lyricist, producer
- Luis J. González "Mr. NaisGai" – composer, lyricist, producer, piano
- Rafa Rodriguez – composer, lyricist, producer
- Andrea Mangiamarchi "Elena Rose" – composer, lyricist
- Eric Pérez Rovira "Eric Duars" – composer, lyricist, executive producer
- José M. Collazo "Colla" – composer, lyricist, mastering engineer, mixing engineer, recording engineer
- Evaluna Montaner – additional composer, lyricist for the remix version
- Amber Rubi Urena – A&R coordinator
- John Eddie Pérez – A&R director
- Alejandro Reglero – A&R director

== Charts ==
=== Weekly charts ===
Weekly peak performance for "Tattoo"
Chart (2020–2021) (Note: Chart peaks in the Argentina Hot 100, Global 200, US Bubbling Under Hot 100 Singles, and Hot Latin Songs charts measure combined data between the original and the Camilo remix version.)	Peak position
Argentina Hot 100 (Billboard)	1
Colombia (National-Report)	1
Global 200 (Billboard) (Note: The Billboard Global 200 chart was launched in September 2020. Therefore, the song did not have a full run on the chart.)	28
Mexico Streaming (AMPROFON)	6
Spain (Promusicae)	3
US Bubbling Under Hot 100 (Billboard)	6
US Hot Latin Songs (Billboard)	7
Venezuela (Record Report)	26

Weekly peak performance for "Tattoo Remix"
Chart (2020–2021)	Peak position
Argentina Hot 100 (Billboard)	1
Argentina (Monitor Latino)	1
Bolivia (Monitor Latino)	3
Chile (Monitor Latino)	2
Colombia (Monitor Latino)	1
Costa Rica (Monitor Latino)	1
Dominican Republic (Monitor Latino)	2
Ecuador (Monitor Latino)	2
El Salvador (Monitor Latino)	1
Global 200 (Billboard)	28
Guatemala (Monitor Latino)	1
Honduras (Monitor Latino)	1
Latin America (Monitor Latino)	1
Mexico Streaming (AMPROFON)	5
Nicaragua (Monitor Latino)	2
Panama (Monitor Latino)	1
Paraguay (Monitor Latino)	3
Peru (Monitor Latino)	1
Puerto Rico (Monitor Latino)	1
Spain (Promusicae)	2
Uruguay (Monitor Latino)	2
US Bubbling Under Hot 100 (Billboard)	6
US Hot Latin Songs (Billboard)	7
US Latin Airplay (Billboard)	1
US Latin Pop Airplay (Billboard)	16
US Latin Rhythm Airplay (Billboard)	1
Venezuela (Monitor Latino)	3

=== Monthly charts ===
Monthly chart position for "Tattoo"
Chart (2020)	Peak position
Paraguay (SGP)	7
Uruguay (CUDISCO)	5

Monthly chart position for "Tattoo Remix"
Chart (2020)	Peak position
Paraguay (SGP)	4

=== Year-end charts ===
2020 year-end chart performance for "Tattoo"
Chart (2020)	Position
Spain (PROMUSICAE)	21
US Hot Latin Songs (Billboard) (Note: The chart measures combined data between the original and the Camilo remix version.)	23

2020 year-end chart performance for "Tattoo Remix"
Chart (2020)	Position
Argentina (Monitor Latino)	6
Bolivia (Monitor Latino)	12
Chile (Monitor Latino)	57
Colombia (Monitor Latino)	1
Costa Rica (Monitor Latino)	6
Dominican Republic (Monitor Latino)	2
Ecuador (Monitor Latino)	8
El Salvador (Monitor Latino)	2
Guatemala (Monitor Latino)	4
Honduras (Monitor Latino)	7
Latin America (Monitor Latino)	5
Nicaragua (Monitor Latino)	19
Panama (Monitor Latino)	9
Paraguay (Monitor Latino)	5
Peru (Monitor Latino)	1
Puerto Rico (Monitor Latino)	12
Spain (PROMUSICAE)	10
Uruguay (Monitor Latino)	14
Uruguay (CUDISCO)	9
US Hot Latin Songs (Billboard)	23
US Latin Airplay (Billboard)	15
US Latin Rhythm Airplay (Billboard)	13
Venezuela (Monitor Latino)	3

2021 year-end chart performance for "Tattoo Remix"
Chart (2021)	Position
Argentina Latino (Monitor Latino)	100
Chile (Monitor Latino)	49
Costa Rica Urbano (Monitor Latino)	48
Ecuador (Monitor Latino)	61
El Salvador (Monitor Latino)	62
Guatemala (Monitor Latino)	28
Honduras (Monitor Latino)	90
Latin America (Monitor Latino)	98
Nicaragua (Monitor Latino)	70
Panama (Monitor Latino)	32
Paraguay (Monitor Latino)	84
Peru (Monitor Latino)	99
Spain (PROMUSICAE)	48
Uruguay Latino (Monitor Latino)	97
Venezuela (Monitor Latino)	47

2022 year-end chart performance for "Tattoo Remix"
Chart (2022)	Position
Costa Rica Urbano (Monitor Latino)	71
Ecuador Urbano (Monitor Latino)	81
Panama (Monitor Latino)	62
Venezuela Urbano (Monitor Latino)	86

2023 year-end chart performance for "Tattoo Remix"
Chart (2023)	Position
Panama Urbano (Monitor Latino)	61

== Certifications ==
Certifications and sales for "Tattoo"
Region	Certification	Certified units/sales
Argentina (CAPIF)	Gold	10,000^{*}
Brazil (Pro-Música Brasil) Remix version with Camilo	Platinum	40,000^{‡}
Canada (Music Canada)	Gold	40,000^{‡}
Colombia	Gold	
Colombia Remix version with Camilo	4× Platinum	
Mexico (AMPROFON)	3× Platinum+Gold	210,000^{‡}
Mexico (AMPROFON) Remix version with Camilo	2× Diamond+2× Platinum+Gold	750,000^{‡}
Peru	2× Platinum	
Spain (Promusicae)	2× Platinum	80,000^{‡}
Spain (Promusicae) Remix version with Camilo	Gold	20,000^{‡}
United States (RIAA)	4× Platinum (Latin)	240,000^{‡}
Streaming
Central America (CFC)	4× Platinum	28,000,000^{†}
Chile (Profovi)	Gold	10,000,000
^{*} Sales figures based on certification alone.^{‡} Sales+streaming figures based on certification alone.^{†} Streaming-only figures based on certification alone.

== Release history ==
Release dates and formats for "Tattoo"
Region	Date	Format	Version	Label	Ref(s)
Various	February 12, 2020	Digital download; streaming	Original	Duars Entertainment	
Various	July 9, 2020	Digital download; streaming	Remix	Sony Music Latin; Duars Entertainment	
Latin America	July 10, 2020	Contemporary hit radio	Remix	Sony Music Latin; Duars Entertainment	
Italy	August 10, 2020	Contemporary hit radio	Remix	Sony Music Latin; Duars Entertainment	

== See also ==
- 2020 in Latin music
- 2021 in Latin music
- List of airplay number-one hits in Argentina
- List of best-selling singles in Spain
- List of Billboard Argentina Hot 100 number-one singles of 2020
- List of Billboard Argentina Hot 100 top-ten singles in 2020
- List of Billboard Hot Latin Songs and Latin Airplay number ones of 2020
