= Elegí =

2020 single by Rauw Alejandro, Dalex, and Lenny Tavárez

Single by Rauw Alejandro, Dalex and Lenny Tavárez featuring Dímelo Flow
- Language: Spanish
- English title: "I Chose"
- Released: March 26, 2020
- Genre: Reggaeton
- Length: 3:17
- Label: Sony Latin
- Songwriters: Pedro David Daleccio Jr.; Isac Ortiz; Raúl A. Ocasio "Rauw Alejandro"; Eric Pérez Soto "Borris"; Julio Manuel González Tavares; Miguel Andres Martínez Perea "Slow Mike"; Ramses Iván Herrera Soto; Joshua Javier Méndez; Jorge Valdés Vázquez
- Producer: Dímelo Flow

Rauw Alejandro singles chronology
"TBT" (2020)	"Elegí" (2020)	"La Cama (Remix)" (2020)

Dalex singles chronology
"Mera" (2020)	"Elegí" (2020)	"+Linda" (2020)

Lenny Tavárez singles chronology
"Nocturna (Remix)" (2020)	"Elegí" (2020)	"Acerola" (2020)

Dímelo Flow singles chronology
"La Isla" (2019)	"Elegí" (2020)	"Ta Ta Ta" (2020)

Music video
- "Elegí" on YouTube

"Elegí" (transl. "I Chose") is a song recorded by Puerto Rican singer Rauw Alejandro, American singer Dalex and Puerto Rican singer Lenny Tavárez, featuring Panamanian producer Dímelo Flow. It was written by Dalex, Isac Ortiz, Alejandro, Borris, Tavárez, Slow Mike, Ramses Iván Herrera Soto, Joshua Javier Méndez, and Dímelo Flow, while the production was handled by Dímelo Flow. The song was released for digital download and streaming as a single by Sony Music Latin on March 26, 2020. A Spanish language reggaeton song, with elements of R&B and electronic music, it is about two people who have intense sexual chemistry and reconnect after having the "best night ever".

"Elegí" received positive reviews from music critics, who complimented its musical arrangements and the singer's vocal mix. It was commercially successful, reaching the top 10 in seven countries, such as Argentina, Colombia, and Mexico. The song has received several certifications, including Latin platinum in the United States. An accompanying music video, released simultaneously with the song, was filmed in Miami Beach and directed by Gustavo Camacho.

A remix of "Elegí" featuring Puerto Rican singer Farruko, Puerto Rican rapper Anuel AA, Panamanian singer Sech, and American singer Justin Quiles, was released on August 27, 2020, as the second single from Alejandro's debut studio album Afrodisíaco (2020). The remix received positive reviews from music critics, who highlighted its added "spice" and "sensuality". An accompanying music video, directed by Camacho, was released simultaneously with the remix. It depicts each of the artists performing on an individual stage, where they share intimacy with their respective partners.

== Background and release ==
On March 13, 2020, Rauw Alejandro teased a collaboration on Twitter: "Rauw ft. ??????? 🤔". Dalex replied to his tweet with a part of the song's lyrics, "Yo no te elegí mi cama fue quien brego ahy". On March 25, Alejandro shared a video of himself listening to a snippet of the track and announced that it would be released that week. "Elegí" by Alejandro, Dalex, and Lenny Tavárez featuring Dímelo Flow was released for digital download and streaming by Sony Music Latin on March 26, 2020.

== Music and lyrics ==
"Elegí"
A 19-second sample of the chorus

Musically, "Elegí" is a Spanish language reggaeton song, with elements of R&B and electronic music. The song was written by Dalex, Isac Ortiz, Alejandro, Borris, Tavárez, Slow Mike, Ramses Iván Herrera Soto, Joshua Javier Méndez, and Dímelo Flow. Its production was handled by Dímelo Flow, and the track runs for a total of 3 minutes and 17 seconds. Lyrically, "Elegí" which translates to "I Chose" in English, is about two people who have intense sexual chemistry and reconnect after having the "best night ever".

== Critical reception ==
Man Hoh Tang Serradell from Revista Young España gave "Elegí" a positive review, noting its fusion of reggaeton and electronic rhythms, and stated that it "captures our attention with its seductive musical arrangements". He continued complimenting the singers as "talented" and described their vocal mix as "delightful". In 2022, Happy FM staff listed the track among Tavárez's five collaborations with which the artist has made history, saying that it "stands out for being very melodic" and "his verses add a lot of energy and sensuality" to the song.

== Commercial performance ==
"Elegí" debuted and peaked at number 12 on the US Billboard Latin Digital Song Sales chart on September 12, 2020, becoming Alejandro's sixth entry on the chart, Dalex's third, Tavárez's fourth, and Dímelo Flow's second. In May 2020, the song was certified Latin platinum by the Recording Industry Association of America (RIAA), for track-equivalent sales of over 60,000 units in the United States.

In Spain's official weekly chart, the song debuted at number 34 on April 5, 2020. It subsequently peaked at number 26 on May 31, 2020, and spent 22 consecutive weeks on the chart. It was later certified platinum by the Productores de Música de España (PROMUSICAE), for track-equivalent sales of over 40,000 units in the country. In Latin America, "Elegí" reached the top 10 in Argentina, Colombia, Dominican Republic, Mexico, Paraguay, Peru, and Uruguay. In Mexico, the song was certified diamond + 2× platinum by the Asociación Mexicana de Productores de Fonogramas y Videogramas (AMPROFON), for track-equivalent sales of over 420,000 units.

== Promotion ==
=== Music video ===
A screenshot from the music video, depicting Alejandro and Tavárez dancing in the street.

An accompanying music video was released simultaneously with the song. The visual was produced by Dímelo Flow and directed by Venezuelan director Gustavo Camacho, who had also directed the videos for Alejandro's previous singles "Fantasías" and "Fantasías (Remix)". The video was filmed in Miami Beach and depicts Art Deco architecture, as well as the friendship between the four artists. It has received over 300 million views on YouTube.

=== Live performances ===
The song was included on the set list for Alejandro's the Rauw Alejandro World Tour.

== Remix ==
"Elegí (Remix)"

Single by Rauw Alejandro, Dalex and Lenny Tavárez featuring Farruko, Anuel AA, Sech, Dímelo Flow and Justin Quiles

from the album Afrodisíaco
- Language: Spanish
- Released: August 27, 2020
- Length: 5:23
- Label: Sony Latin
- Songwriters: Eric Pérez Rovira "Eric Duars"; Joshua Javier Méndez; Pedro David Daleccio Jr. "Dalex"; Ramses Iván Herrera Soto "BCA"; Jorge Valdés Vázquez "Dímelo Flow"; Emmanuel Gazmey "Anuel AA"; Julio Manuel González Tavares "Lenny Tavárez"; Miguel Andres Martínez Perea "Slow Mike"; Andy Bauza; Carlos Efrén Reyes Rosado "Farruko"; Cristian Andrés Salazar; Franklin Jovani Martinez; Isac Ortiz; Justin Rafael Quiles; Raúl A. Ocasio "Rauw Alejandro"; Carlos Isaías Morales Williams "Sech"
- Producer: Dímelo Flow

Farruko singles chronology
"Condena" (2020)	"Elegí (Remix)" (2020)	"Aruba" (2020)

Anuel AA singles chronology
"Reggaetonera" (2020)	"Elegí (Remix)" (2020)	"Don Don" (2020)

Sech singles chronology
"Qué Lástima" (2020)	"Elegí (Remix)" (2020)	"Relación (Remix)" (2020)

Justin Quiles singles chronology
"Sativa" (2020)	"Elegí (Remix)" (2020)	"Tussi" (2020)

Music video
- "Elegí (Remix)" on YouTube

On August 26, 2020, Alejandro teased a remix of "Elegí" on Twitter, tweeting "ELEGI REMIX 🤯". The following day, he released the remix version featuring Puerto Rican singer Farruko, Puerto Rican rapper Anuel AA, Panamanian singer Sech, and American singer Justin Quiles, as the second single from his debut studio album Afrodisíaco (2020). Anuel AA, Andy Bauza, Farruko, Cristian Andrés Salazar, Frank Miami, Quiles, and Sech joined the original version's lyricists to write the remix version. Anuel AA verse references his 2018 song "Amanece". The version runs for a total of 5 minutes and 23 seconds.

=== Critical reception ===
Upon release, "Elegí (Remix)" was met with positive reviews from music critics. In her review for Billboard, Jessica Roiz stated that Anuel AA, Farruko, Sech, and Quiles, add "more spice and sensuality" to the song. An author of El Comercio described the production as "epic", while El Vocero staff named the artists "some of the most popular performers of the reggaeton genre".

=== Commercial performance ===
"Elegí (Remix)" failed to match the commercial success of its original version. The remix debuted and peaked at number 61 on Spain's official weekly chart on the chart issue dated September 6, 2020. In Paraguay, it reached number 91 on SGP's monthly chart in November 2020.

=== Music video ===
A screenshot from the music video, depicting Alejandro flirting with a woman.

An accompanying music video was released simultaneously with the song. The visual was produced by Mastermind Entertainment and directed by Gustavo Camacho. It depicts each of the artists performing on an individual stage, where they share intimacy with their respective partners. An author of El Comercio labeled it "an artistic representation of the message of sensuality and romanticism within the song".

== Track listings ==
Digital download / streaming
No.	Title	Length
1.	"Elegí (feat. Dímelo Flow)"	3:17

Digital download / streaming
No.	Title	Length
1.	"Elegí (feat. Farruko, Anuel AA, Sech, Dímelo Flow & Justin Quiles) [Remix]"	5:23

== Credits and personnel ==
Credits adapted from Tidal.

- Rauw Alejandro – associated performer, composer, lyricist
- Dalex – associated performer, composer, lyricist
- Lenny Tavárez – associated performer, composer, lyricist
- Dímelo Flow – associated performer, composer, lyricist, producer, featured artist, mixing engineer
- Isac Ortiz – composer, lyricist
- Eric Pérez Rovira "Eric Duars" – composer, lyricist, executive producer
- Slow Mike – composer, lyricist
- Ramses Iván Herrera Soto – composer, lyricist
- Joshua Javier Méndez – composer, lyricist
- Mike Fuller – mastering engineer
- José M. Collazo – recording engineer
- Farruko – associated performer, composer, lyricist, featured artist for the remix version
- Anuel AA – associated performer, composer, lyricist, featured artist for the remix version
- Sech – associated performer, composer, lyricist, featured artist for the remix version
- Justin Quiles – associated performer, composer, lyricist, featured artist for the remix version
- Andy Bauza – composer, lyricist for the remix version
- Cristian Andrés Salazar – composer, lyricist for the remix version
- Frank Miami – composer, lyricist for the remix version

== Charts ==
=== Weekly charts ===
Weekly peak performance for "Elegí"
Chart (2020–2021)	Peak position
Argentina Hot 100 (Billboard)	4
Colombia (Monitor Latino)	10
Colombia (National-Report)	13
Costa Rica Urbano (Monitor Latino)	11
Dominican Republic (Monitor Latino)	9
Global 200 (Billboard) (Note: The Billboard Global 200 chart was launched in September 2020. Therefore, the song did not have a full run on the chart.)	98
Honduras (Monitor Latino)	18
Mexico Streaming (AMPROFON)	7
Paraguay (Monitor Latino)	14
Peru (Monitor Latino)	10
Peru Streaming (UNIMPRO)	23
Spain (Promusicae)	26
US Latin Digital Song Sales (Billboard)	12

Weekly peak performance for "Elegí (Remix)"
Chart (2020)	Peak position
Spain (Promusicae)	61

=== Monthly charts ===
Monthly chart position for "Elegí"
Chart (2020–2021)	Peak position
Paraguay (SGP)	5
Uruguay (CUDISCO)	6

Monthly chart position for "Elegí (Remix)"
Chart (2020)	Peak position
Paraguay (SGP)	91

=== Year-end charts ===
2020 year-end chart performance for "Elegí"
Chart (2020)	Position
Colombia (Monitor Latino)	30
Costa Rica (Monitor Latino)	100
Dominican Republic (Monitor Latino)	28
Guatemala Pop (Monitor Latino)	99
Honduras (Monitor Latino)	85
Latin America (Monitor Latino)	81
Paraguay (Monitor Latino)	40
Peru (Monitor Latino)	44
Spain (PROMUSICAE)	94

2021 year-end chart performance for "Elegí"
Chart (2021)	Position
Honduras Urbano (Monitor Latino)	91
Peru Urbano (Monitor Latino)	44

== Certifications ==
Certifications and sales for "Elegí"
Region	Certification	Certified units/sales
Brazil (Pro-Música Brasil)	Gold	20,000^{‡}
Mexico (AMPROFON)	2× Diamond+Gold	630,000^{‡}
Spain (Promusicae)	Platinum	40,000^{‡}
Spain (Promusicae) Remix version	Gold	30,000^{‡}
United States (RIAA)	Platinum (Latin)	60,000^{‡}
Streaming
Central America (CFC)	3× Platinum	21,000,000^{†}
^{‡} Sales+streaming figures based on certification alone.^{†} Streaming-only figures based on certification alone.

== Release history ==
Release dates and formats for "Elegí"
Region	Date	Format	Version	Label	Ref(s)
Various	March 26, 2020	Digital download; streaming	Original	Sony Music Latin	
Latin America	March 27, 2020	Contemporary hit radio	Original	Sony Music Latin	
Various	August 27, 2020	Digital download; streaming	Remix	Sony Music Latin	

== See also ==
- List of Billboard Argentina Hot 100 top-ten singles in 2020
