= Fantasías =

2019 single by Rauw Alejandro and Farruko

Single by Rauw Alejandro and Farruko
- Language: Spanish
- English title: "Fantasies"
- Released: August 29, 2019
- Genre: Reggaeton; dancehall
- Length: 3:19
- Label: Duars; Sony Latin
- Songwriters: Raúl A. Ocasio; Carlos Efrén Reyes; Eric Pérez; Franklin J. Martinez; Ricardo Lloyd Johnson; Windel Edwards
- Producers: Urbani Mota; Luis J. Romero

Rauw Alejandro singles chronology
"Cuerpo en Venta" (2019)	"Fantasías" (2019)	"Tequila Sunrise" (2019)

Farruko singles chronology
"Recuerdos (Remix)" (2019)	"Fantasías" (2019)	"El Favor" (2019)

Music video
- "Fantasías" on YouTube

"Fantasías" (transl. "Fantasies") is a song recorded by Puerto Rican singers Rauw Alejandro and Farruko. It was written by Alejandro, Farruko, Eric Duars, Franklin J. Martinez, Ricardo Lloyd Johnson, and Windel Edwards, while the production was handled by Urbani Mota and Luis J. Romero. The song was released for digital download and streaming as a single by Duars Music Distribution and Sony Music Latin on August 29, 2019. A Spanish language melodic reggaeton and dancehall song, it is about the singers living out all of their "fantasies" with the girl they are crushing on. The track received positive reviews from music critics, who noted Alejandro's charisma and the song's "eminent success". It was nominated for Best Collab at the 2020 Heat Latin Music Awards.

"Fantasías" was commercially successful, reaching number one in Uruguay, as well as the top five in several other countries such as Argentina, Mexico, and Spain. The song has received several certifications, including Latin 19× platinum in the United States. An accompanying music video, released simultaneously with the song, was filmed in Miami and directed by Gustavo "Gus" Camacho. To promote the song, Alejandro and Farruko performed it at the 2020 Premios Tu Música Urbano.

A remix of "Fantasías" with Puerto Rican rapper Anuel AA and Dominican singer Natti Natasha, featuring Farruko and Puerto Rican singer Lunay was released on March 5, 2020. The remix received positive reviews from music critics and was nominated for Best Latin Remix at the 2020 Latin Music Official Italian Awards. It experienced commercial success in Spanish-language markets, reaching number one in Peru, and the top 10 in several other countries, including Colombia and Venezuela. It was certified platinum+gold in Mexico and platinum in Spain. The accompanying music video for "Fantasías (Remix)", released simultaneously with the song, was filmed in Miami and directed by Camacho. It depicts the singers "having a great time together at a beach party".

== Background and release ==
In 2018, Rauw Alejandro composed "Fantasías", inspired by the 2010 reggae song, "Hold You" by Gyptian. In early 2019, he presented the song to Farruko, who "loved" it. Farruko had previously invited Alejandro as a guest to his shows and Alejandro considered working again with him "very valuable". On August 6, 2019, Alejandro announced the song's title as "Fantasías" and confirmed that it was a collaboration with Farruko. Almost two weeks later, he shared snippets of the track on Twitter. During an interview with Primera Hora, he explained about the song:

It's a song that I made for when everyone is in the club, people look at each other as if they were looking for connection.

On August 28, 2019, Alejandro announced that "Fantasías" would be released the following day. It was released for digital download and streaming as a single by Duars Music Distribution and Sony Music Latin on the specified date. An unplugged version of the song was released on November 5, 2019.

== Music and lyrics ==
"Fantasías"
A 19-second sample of the chorus, which references Gyptian's "Hold You".

Musically, "Fantasías" is a Spanish language melodic reggaeton and dancehall song, written by Alejandro, Farruko, Eric Duars, Franklin J. Martinez, Ricardo Lloyd Johnson, and Windel Edwards. Its production was handled by Urbani Mota and Luis J. Romero, and the track runs for a total of 3 minutes and 19 seconds. Lyrically, "Fantasías" which translates to "Fantasies" in English, is about Alejandro "living out all of his fantasies with the girl he's crushing on". He explained to Primera Hora: "It talks about this girl that you know you like and you see her on the scene. [...] Everyone has been through that, they enter the party and see that person who catches their attention, they are single and looking for something." The lyrics include, "Cómo le puedo hacer, pa' convencerte / A solas quiero tenerte / Qué tú harás si te digo, mil fantasías contigo" (How can I do it, to convince you / I only want to have you / What will you do if I tell you, a thousand fantasies with you).

== Critical reception ==
"Fantasías" has been met with positive reviews from music critics. In 2022, Ernesto Lechner from Rolling Stone ranked the track as Alejandro's 22nd-best song, saying it proved "that he had as much charisma — if not more — as any high-profile reggaetonero", while it "was one of the first collaborations where up-and-coming Rauw glittered under the spotlight". An author of El Vocero highlighted "the eminent success" that the song brought to the career of Alejandro. Primera Hora's Rosa Escribano Carrasquillo labeled the song "a topic to connect", and Los 40 staff named it a "Summer Song".

=== Accolades ===
"Fantasías" was nominated for Best Song New Generation at the 2020 Premios Tu Música Urbano, but lost to "Otro Trago" by Sech and Darell. The song was also nominated for Best Collab at the 2020 Heat Latin Music Awards. It was acknowledged as an award-winning song at the 2021 ASCAP Latin Awards and the 2022 BMI Latin Awards.

== Commercial performance ==
"Fantasías" became Alejandro's breakthrough song. The song debuted at number 37 on the US Billboard Hot Latin Songs chart on September 21, 2019, becoming Alejandro's fifth entry and Farruko's 34th. On December 28, 2019, the track reached its peak of number 12, giving Alejandro his first top-20 hit on the chart. The song also peaked at number nine on both the Latin Airplay and Latin Rhythm Airplay charts, number three on the Latin Digital Song Sales, and number two on the Tropical Airplay. The song was certified 19× platinum (Latin) by the Recording Industry Association of America (RIAA), for track-equivalent sales of over 1,140,000 units in the United States. Additionally, the unplugged version was certified Latin platinum by the RIAA, for track-equivalent sales of over 60,000 units in the region.

Besides the United States, "Fantasías" achieved success in multiple European countries. In Spain's official weekly chart, the song debuted at number 58 on September 15, 2019. It subsequently peaked at number four on the chart issue dated November 3, 2019, becoming Alejandro's first top five hit in the country and Farruko's second. The track was later certified triple platinum by the Productores de Música de España (PROMUSICAE), for track-equivalent sales of over 120,000 units in the country. It was also certified gold by the Federazione Industria Musicale Italiana (FIMI), for track-equivalent sales of over 25,000 units in the latter. In Latin America, "Fantasías" experienced a significant commercial success. It reached number one in Uruguay, and peaked in the top 10 of Argentina, Bolivia, Colombia, Costa Rica, Dominican Republic, Ecuador, El Salvador, Honduras, Latin America, Mexico, Nicaragua, Panama, Paraguay, and Peru. In Chile, Guatemala, Puerto Rico, and Venezuela, it reached the top 20. The song was certified diamond+2× platinum by the Asociación Mexicana de Productores de Fonogramas y Videogramas (AMPROFON), for track-equivalent sales of over 420,000 units in Mexico.

== Promotion ==
=== Music video ===
A screenshot from the music video, depicting Alejandro dancing with several female dancers in a party.

An accompanying music video was released simultaneously with the song. The visual was filmed in Miami, produced by the Mastermind Company, and directed by Gustavo "Gus" Camacho. During his interview with Primera Hora, Alejandro explained: "It's tropical, with the chinchorreos. The concept of the video is on an island and a lot of partying, a lot of Jamaican vibes, a lot of movement, a lot of dancing."

=== Live performances ===
Alejandro and Farruko performed "Fantasías" at the 2nd Premios Tu Música Urbano on March 5, 2020. The song was also included on the set lists for Alejandro's the Fantasías Tour, the Rauw Alejandro World Tour, and the Vice Versa Tour, as well as Farruko's the Gangalee Tour.

== Remix ==
"Fantasías (Remix)"

Single by Rauw Alejandro, Anuel AA, and Natti Natasha featuring Farruko and Lunay
- Language: Spanish
- Released: March 5, 2020
- Length: 4:27
- Label: Duars
- Songwriters: Raúl A. Ocasio; Carlos E. Reyes; Emmanuel Gazmey Santiago; Eric Pérez; Franklin J. Martinez; Jefnier Osorio Moreno; Luis J. Romero; Natalia A. Gutiérrez Batista; Ricardo Lloyd Johnson; Urbani Mota Cedeño; Windel Edwards
- Producers: Urbani Mota "Urba"; Luis J. Romero "Rome"

Anuel AA singles chronology
"Keii" (2020)	"Fantasías (Remix)" (2020)	"Follow" (2020)

Natti Natasha singles chronology
"Me Estás Matando" (2020)	"Fantasías (Remix)" (2020)	"Honey Boo" (2019)

Lunay singles chronology
"Mojadero" (2019)	"Fantasías (Remix)" (2020)	"Como Suena el Piano (Remix)" (2020)

Music video
- "Fantasías (Remix)" on YouTube

On February 17, 2020, Alejandro teased the recording of a remix of "Fantasías", asking his followers to guess who he has collaborated with on it. On March 5, 2020, he released the remix version with Puerto Rican rapper Anuel AA and Dominican singer Natti Natasha, featuring Farruko and Puerto Rican singer Lunay. Anuel AA, Natasha, Lunay, Urba, and Rome joined the original version's lyricists to write the remix version. The version runs for a total of 4 minutes and 27 seconds.

=== Critical reception ===
Upon release, "Fantasías (Remix)" was met with widely positive reviews from music critics. In her review for Billboard, Jessica Roiz described the remix as "fiery" and noted that "each artist brings their individual flow to the track", highlighting Natasha's "fierce vocals" and Alejandro's "impeccable dance moves". Also from Billboard, Griselda Flores labeled it "[a] star-studded collab". Bolivar Feijoo of Wow La Revista named it "a unique collaboration", while Los 40 staff described it as "great".

=== Accolades ===
PopSugar ranked "Fantasías (Remix)" among the "35 Latin Songs Perfect For Dancing en la Sala". The remix was nominated for Best Latin Remix at the 2020 Latin Music Official Italian Awards, but lost to Alejandro's own "Tattoo Remix" with Camilo. "Fantasías (Remix)" was also nominated for Best Urban Song at the 2020 Latino Music Awards. Additionally, it was voted by Billboard readers to be the favorite Latin remix of 2020.

=== Commercial performance ===
"Fantasías (Remix)" debuted at number 17 on Spain's official weekly chart on the chart issue dated March 15, 2020. The following week, it reached its peak of number 16. The remix was later certified platinum by the Productores de Música de España (PROMUSICAE), for track-equivalent sales of over 40,000 units in the country. In Latin America, "Fantasías (Remix)" experienced commercial success. It reached number one in Peru, and peaked in the top 10 of Colombia, Costa Rica, Dominican Republic, Ecuador, El Salvador, Guatemala, Honduras, Latin America, Nicaragua, Panama, Paraguay, Venezuela. In Argentina and Bolivia, it reached the top 15. The song was certified platinum+gold by the Asociación Mexicana de Productores de Fonogramas y Videogramas (AMPROFON), for track-equivalent sales of over 90,000 units in Mexico.

=== Music video ===
A screenshot from the music video, depicting the singers enjoying the beach party.

An accompanying music video was released simultaneously with the song. The visual was produced by Mastermind Company, directed by Gustavo "Gus" Camacho, and filmed in Miami. It depicts Alejandro, Anuel AA, Natasha, Farruko, and Lunay singing and "having a great time together at a beach party". Billboard's Jessica Roiz described the video as "festive" and "tropical", while Bolivar Feijoo of Wow La Revista called it "happy", "tropical" and "colorful".

=== Live performances ===
Natasha performed a medley of "Despacio", "Fantasías (Remix)", and "DJ No Pare (Remix)" on Christmas Day of 2021.

== Track listings ==
Digital download / streaming
No.	Title	Length
1.	"Fantasías"	3:19

Digital download / streaming
No.	Title	Length
1.	"Fantasías (Unplugged)"	3:20

Digital download / streaming
No.	Title	Length
1.	"Fantasías (Remix) [feat. Farruko & Lunay]"	4:27

== Credits and personnel ==
Credits adapted from Spotify.

- Rauw Alejandro – associated performer, composer, lyricist
- Farruko – associated performer, composer, lyricist
- Eric Pérez – composer, lyricist
- Franklin J. Martinez – composer, lyricist
- Ricardo Lloyd Johnson – composer, lyricist
- Windel Edwards – composer, lyricist
- Urbani Mota – producer
- Luis J. Romero – producer

== Charts ==
=== Weekly charts ===
Weekly chart performance for "Fantasías"
Chart (2019–2020)	Peak position
Argentina Hot 100 (Billboard)	2
Argentina (Monitor Latino)	15
Bolivia (Monitor Latino)	4
Chile (Monitor Latino)	14
Colombia (Monitor Latino)	2
Colombia (National-Report)	3
Costa Rica (Monitor Latino)	4
Dominican Republic (Monitor Latino)	3
Ecuador (Monitor Latino)	6
El Salvador (Monitor Latino)	3
Guatemala (Monitor Latino)	14
Honduras (Monitor Latino)	3
Latin America (Monitor Latino)	6
Mexico Streaming (AMPROFON)	5
Nicaragua (Monitor Latino)	2
Panama (Monitor Latino)	6
Paraguay (Monitor Latino)	3
Peru (Monitor Latino)	2
Puerto Rico (Monitor Latino)	19
Spain (Promusicae)	4
US Bubbling Under Hot 100 (Billboard)	11
US Hot Latin Songs (Billboard)	12
US Latin Airplay (Billboard)	9
US Latin Pop Airplay (Billboard)	27
US Latin Rhythm Airplay (Billboard)	9
US Tropical Airplay (Billboard)	2
Venezuela (Monitor Latino)	17

Weekly chart performance for "Fantasías (Remix)"
Chart (2020)	Peak position
Argentina (Monitor Latino)	15
Bolivia (Monitor Latino)	13
Chile (Monitor Latino)	20
Colombia (Monitor Latino)	4
Costa Rica (Monitor Latino)	10
Dominican Republic (Monitor Latino)	3
Ecuador (Monitor Latino)	10
El Salvador (Monitor Latino)	3
Guatemala (Monitor Latino)	5
Honduras (Monitor Latino)	2
Latin America (Monitor Latino)	10
Nicaragua (Monitor Latino)	3
Panama (Monitor Latino)	8
Paraguay (Monitor Latino)	6
Peru (Monitor Latino)	1
Spain (Promusicae)	16
Venezuela (Monitor Latino)	7

=== Monthly charts ===
Monthly chart position for "Fantasías"
Chart (2019–2020)	Peak position
Paraguay (SGP)	4
Uruguay (CUDISCO)	1

=== Year-end charts ===
2019 year-end chart performance for "Fantasías"
Chart (2019)	Position
Spain (PROMUSICAE)	69

2020 year-end chart performance for "Fantasías"
Chart (2020)	Position
El Salvador (ASAP EGC)	3
Spain (PROMUSICAE)	70
Uruguay (CUDISCO)	5
US Hot Latin Songs (Billboard)	42
US Latin Airplay (Billboard)	33
US Latin Rhythm Airplay (Billboard)	28
US Tropical Airplay (Billboard)	20

2020 year-end chart performance for "Fantasías (Remix)"
Chart (2020)	Position
Argentina (Monitor Latino)	50
Bolivia (Monitor Latino)	15
Chile (Monitor Latino)	24
Colombia (Monitor Latino)	3
Costa Rica (Monitor Latino)	11
Dominican Republic (Monitor Latino)	8
Ecuador (Monitor Latino)	9
El Salvador (Monitor Latino)	4
Guatemala (Monitor Latino)	2
Honduras (Monitor Latino)	2
Latin America (Monitor Latino)	11
Nicaragua (Monitor Latino)	2
Panama (Monitor Latino)	16
Paraguay (Monitor Latino)	6
Peru (Monitor Latino)	8
Uruguay (Monitor Latino)	50
Venezuela (Monitor Latino)	15

2021 year-end chart performance for "Fantasías (Remix)"
Chart (2021)	Position
Ecuador Urbano (Monitor Latino)	76
Costa Rica Urbano (Monitor Latino)	81
Guatemala (Monitor Latino)	99
Honduras (Monitor Latino)	96
Nicaragua (Monitor Latino)	66
Panama (Monitor Latino)	81
Peru Urbano (Monitor Latino)	68

2022 year-end chart performance for "Fantasías (Remix)"
Chart (2022)	Position
Honduras Urbano (Monitor Latino)	94
Nicaragua Urbano (Monitor Latino)	88
Panama Urbano (Monitor Latino)	84

== Certifications ==
Certifications and sales for "Fantasías"
Region	Certification	Certified units/sales
Italy (FIMI)	Gold	25,000^{‡}
Mexico (AMPROFON)	2× Diamond+Platinum+Gold	690,000^{‡}
Mexico (AMPROFON) Remix version	Platinum+Gold	90,000^{‡}
Spain (Promusicae)	3× Platinum	120,000^{‡}
Spain (Promusicae) Remix version	Platinum	40,000^{‡}
United States (RIAA)	19× Platinum (Latin)	1,140,000^{‡}
United States (RIAA) Unplugged version	Platinum (Latin)	60,000^{‡}
Streaming
Chile (Profovi)	Diamond	50,000,000
^{‡} Sales+streaming figures based on certification alone.

== See also ==
- List of best-selling singles in Spain
- List of Billboard Argentina Hot 100 top-ten singles in 2019
- List of Billboard Argentina Hot 100 top-ten singles in 2020
