= List of number-one songs of 2021 (Panama) =

This is a list of the number-one songs of 2021 in Panama. The charts are published by Monitor Latino, based on airplay across radio stations in Panama using the Radio Tracking Data, LLC in real time, with its chart week running from Monday to Sunday.

In 2021 so far, fourteen songs reached number one in Panama, with eight songs being collaborations; a fifteenth single, "Hawái" by Maluma featuring the Weeknd, began its run at number one in November 2020. In fact, seventeen acts topped the chart as either lead or featured artists, with eleven—Eddy Lover, El Roockie, Emilia, Alex Rose, Juhn, Martín Machore, Magic Juan, Rauw Alejandro, Prince Royce, Mau y Ricky, Lucy Vives, Kampi and Rey King—achieving their first number-one single in Panama.

With "Olvidemos" topping the Panamanian charts, Eddy Lover and El Roockie became the fifth and sixth Panamanian acts to reach number one in their home country, following Joey Montana, Sech, Jace López and Real Phantom. Later, Martin Machore became the seventh Panamanian act to reach number one, as "Pegaito" topped the Panamanian charts.

"Chica Super Poderosa" by Martin Machore and Magic Juan was the longest-running number-one of the year, and later ranked as the best-performing single of 2021 in Panama, leading the chart for eight non-consecutive weeks.

Maluma is the only act to have more than a number-one song, with four.

== Chart history ==
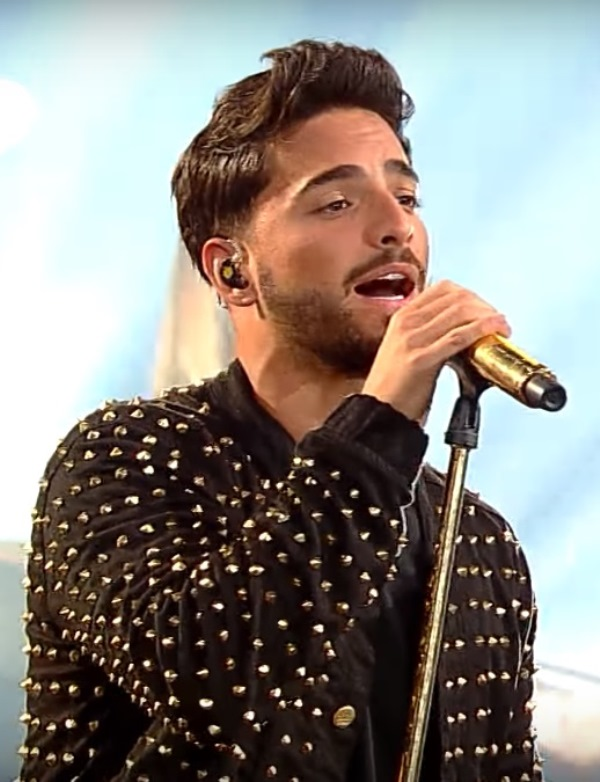
Maluma (pictured) became the act with the most number-one songs in Panama, as "Agua de Jamaica", "Sobrio" and "Sukutubla" topped the chart, earning ten chart-topping singles in total.

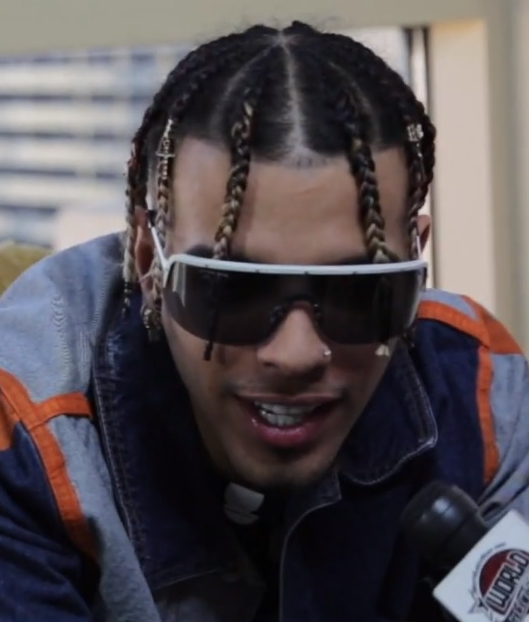
Rauw Alejandro (pictured) earned his first number-one single in Panama with "Todo de Ti".

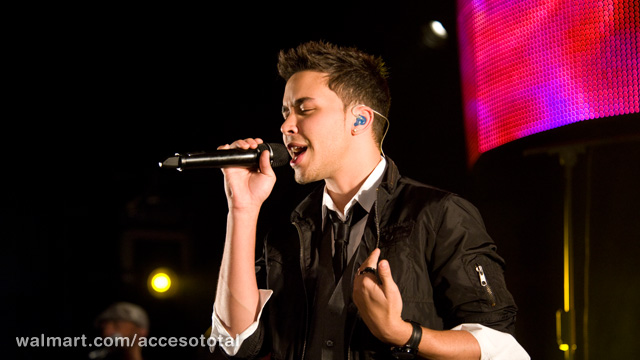
Prince Royce (pictured) earned his first number-one single in Panama with "Lao' a Lao'".

Key
†	Indicates best-performing single of 2021

Issue date	Song	Artist	Reference
4 January	"Olvidemos"	Eddy Lover and El Roockie	
11 January	"Olvidemos"	Eddy Lover and El Roockie	
18 January	"Olvidemos"	Eddy Lover and El Roockie	
25 January	"Bendición"	Emilia and Alex Rose	
1 February	"Bendición"	Emilia and Alex Rose	
8 February	"Hawái"	Maluma featuring the Weeknd	
15 February	"Olvidemos"	Eddy Lover and El Roockie	
22 February	"Bandido"	Myke Towers and Juhn	
1 March	"Pegaito"	Martin Machore	
8 March	"Agua de Jamaica"	Maluma	
15 March	"Agua de Jamaica"	Maluma	
22 March	"Agua de Jamaica"	Maluma	
29 March	"Agua de Jamaica"	Maluma	
5 April	"Agua de Jamaica"	Maluma	
12 April	"Agua de Jamaica"	Maluma	
19 April	"Canción Bonita"	Carlos Vives and Ricky Martin	
26 April	"Canción Bonita"	Carlos Vives and Ricky Martin	
3 May	"Canción Bonita"	Carlos Vives and Ricky Martin	
10 May	"Chica Super Poderosa" †	Martin Machore and Magic Juan	
17 May	"Chica Super Poderosa" †	Martin Machore and Magic Juan	
24 May	"Chica Super Poderosa" †	Martin Machore and Magic Juan	
31 May	"Chica Super Poderosa" †	Martin Machore and Magic Juan	
7 June	"Chica Super Poderosa" †	Martin Machore and Magic Juan	
14 June	"Chica Super Poderosa" †	Martin Machore and Magic Juan	
21 June	"Chica Super Poderosa" †	Martin Machore and Magic Juan	
28 June	"Todo de Ti"	Rauw Alejandro	
5 July	"Chica Super Poderosa" †	Martin Machore and Magic Juan	
12 July	"Sobrio"	Maluma	
19 July	"Sobrio"	Maluma	
26 July	"Sobrio"	Maluma	
2 August	"Sobrio"	Maluma	
9 August	"Toa la Noche"	CNCO	
16 August	"Toa la Noche"	CNCO	
23 August	"Toa la Noche"	CNCO	
30 August	"Lao' a Lao'"	Prince Royce	
6 September	"Lao' a Lao'"	Prince Royce	
13 September	"Besos en Cualquier Horario"	Carlos Vives featuring Mau y Ricky and Lucy Vives	
20 September	"Besos en Cualquier Horario"	Carlos Vives featuring Mau y Ricky and Lucy Vives	
27 September	"Besos en Cualquier Horario"	Carlos Vives featuring Mau y Ricky and Lucy Vives	
4 October	"Besos en Cualquier Horario"	Carlos Vives featuring Mau y Ricky and Lucy Vives	
11 October	"Besos en Cualquier Horario"	Carlos Vives featuring Mau y Ricky and Lucy Vives	
18 October	"Insomnia"	Kampi featuring Rey King	
25 October	"Sukutubla"	Lalo Ebratt and Maluma	
1 November	"Sukutubla"	Lalo Ebratt and Maluma	
8 November	"Sukutubla"	Lalo Ebratt and Maluma	
15 November	"Sukutubla"	Lalo Ebratt and Maluma	
22 November	"Tacones Rojos"	Sebastián Yatra	
29 November	"Tacones Rojos"	Sebastián Yatra	
6 December	"Tacones Rojos"	Sebastián Yatra	
13 December	"Tacones Rojos"	Sebastián Yatra	
20 December	"Tacones Rojos"	Sebastián Yatra	
27 December	"Tacones Rojos"	Sebastián Yatra	
