= 2/Catorce =

2021 single by Rauw Alejandro and Mr. Naisgai

Single by Rauw Alejandro and Mr. Naisgai

from the album Vice Versa
- Language: Spanish
- English title: "2/Fourteen"
- Released: February 14, 2021
- Genre: Kizomba; Dancehall
- Length: 3:32
- Label: Sony Latin; Duars
- Songwriter: Raúl Alejandro Ocasio Ruiz "Rauw Alejandro"
- Producer: Mr. Naisgai

Rauw Alejandro singles chronology
"Dile a Él" (2021)	"2/Catorce" (2021)	"Vacío" (2021)

Music video
- "2/Catorce" on YouTube

"2/Catorce" (transl. "2/Fourteen") is a song recorded by Puerto Rican singer Rauw Alejandro and Puerto Rican producer Mr. Naisgai for Alejandro's second studio album, Vice Versa (2021). It was written by Alejandro, while the production was handled by Mr. Naisgai. The song was released for digital download and streaming by Sony Music Latin and Duars Entertainment on February 14, 2021, as the lead single from the album. A Spanish language Kizomba song, it is about passionate and sexual moments as a couple, and situations where the temperature rises.

"2/Catorce" received positive reviews from music critics, who described it as sensual. The track was commercially successful, reaching number one in Dominican Republic, as well as the top 15 in several other countries such as Argentina and Spain, and on Billboard's Hot Latin Songs in the United States. The song has received several certifications, including double platinum in Mexico. An accompanying music video, released simultaneously with the song, was filmed in Medellín and directed by Eric Duars and Alejandro.

== Background and release ==
Rauw Alejandro released his debut studio album, Afrodisíaco on November 13, 2020. Two weeks after finishing the work on Afrodisíaco, he started working on his second studio album, Vice Versa. In February 2021, while he was in Medellín, he recorded "2/Catorce" along with producer Mr. Naisgai. On February 14, 2021, coinciding with Valentine's Day, the song was surprise-released for digital download and streaming by Sony Music Latin and Duars Entertainment as the lead single from Vice Versa. Alejandro explained to his followers on Instagram:

This week I was in Medellin, and this topic came up. I wasn't planning on releasing it, but it became my favorite song, and what better way to dedicate it tomorrow. My gift to you, Love you!!!

He explained about releasing the song without previous planning, stating that he thinks "it doesn't have to be good, it has to feel good", expressing that "art is relative". The song was later included as the fifth track on Alejandro's second studio album, Vice Versa, released June 25, 2021.

== Music and lyrics ==
"2/Catorce"
A 21-second sample of the chorus

Musically, "2/Catorce" is a Spanish language Kizomba song, written by Alejandro and produced by Mr. Naisgai. The track runs for a total of 3 minutes and 32 seconds. Lyrically, "2/Catorce" which translates to "2/Fourteen" in English, is about passionate and sexual moments as a couple, and situations where the temperature rises. The lyrics include, "Qué suerte que soy yo el que puede comerte / ¿Qué hice para merecerte? / Cada día que pasa lo que siento es má' fuerte / Solo quiero verte" (How lucky that I am the one who can eat you / What did I do to deserve you? / Every day that passes what I feel becomes stronger / I just want to see you).

== Critical reception ==
Upon release, "2/Catorce" was met with widely positive reviews from music critics. Sónica.mx critic Armando Tovar gave it a positive review, saying it "dominated the trends of social networks" and "raised the temperature among his followers". Writing for Los 40, Jimena Garrido De Castro labeled the track a "gem", and Happyfm staff praised it as an "authentic bomb". Maliah West and Sabrina Sanchez from Sidekick described the song as "smooth" and "sensual", while Latina's Lucas Villa named it "one of the sexiest songs" in Alejandro's discography. In her review for Teen Vogue, Alexis Hodoyan-Gastelum compared it with Alejandro's hit song "Todo de Ti", stating that "2/Catorce" is "mellow" and "sexier". In 2022, Ernesto Lechner from Rolling Stone ranked the track as the singer's 27th-best song, describing its production as "lovely", saying it envelopes Alejandro's "voice in gauzy synths and a nimble downbeat".

=== Accolades ===
In 2022, Fucsia ranked "2/Catorce" among "The 10 Best Reggaeton Songs For A Moment Of Passion With Your Partner".

== Commercial performance ==
"2/Catorce" is one of Alejandro's most commercially successful songs in his career, peaking at number 43 on the Billboard Global 200. The song debuted at number 46 on the US Billboard Hot Latin Songs chart on May 29, 2021, becoming Alejandro's 15th entry. The following week, coinciding with the success of "Todo de Ti", "2/Catorce" climbed to number 26. Following the release of Vice Versa, the song reached its peak of number 11. The song was certified platinum (Latin) by the Recording Industry Association of America (RIAA), for track-equivalent sales of over 60,000 units in the United States. In Spain, "2/Catorce" peaked at number 12 and was certified triple platinum by the Productores de Música de España (PROMUSICAE), for track-equivalent sales of over 180,000 units in the country. The track reached number one in Dominican Republic, and number three in Nicaragua. It also peaked in the top 20 of Argentina, Colombia, and Paraguay. In Mexico, the song was certified double platinum by the Asociación Mexicana de Productores de Fonogramas y Videogramas (AMPROFON), for track-equivalent sales of over 280,000 units.

== Promotion ==
=== Music video ===
A screenshot from the music video, depicting Alejandro singing the song on a rooftop.

An accompanying music video was released simultaneously with the song. The visual was filmed in Medellín and directed by Eric Duars and Alejandro. It depicts Alejandro standing alone and singing on a rooftop, while the pink sky surrounds him, while he overlooks "the icy city below". In her review for Los 40, Jimena Garrido De Castro described it as "simple but colorful".

=== Live performances ===
The song was included on the set lists for Alejandro's the Rauw Alejandro World Tour and the Vice Versa Tour.

== Track listing ==
Digital download / streaming
No.	Title	Length
1.	"2/Catorce"	3:32

== Credits and personnel ==
Credits adapted from Tidal.

- Rauw Alejandro – associated performer, composer, lyricist
- Mr. Naisgai – associated performer, producer
- José M. Collazo "Colla" – mastering engineer, mixing engineer
- Jorge E. Pizarro "Kenobi" – recording engineer

== Charts ==
=== Weekly charts ===
Weekly chart performance for "2/Catorce"
Chart (2021–2022)	Peak position
Argentina Hot 100 (Billboard)	12
Colombia (Monitor Latino)	19
Costa Rica (Monitor Latino)	16
Dominican Republic (Monitor Latino)	1
Ecuador Songs (Billboard) (Note: The Hits of the World charts were launched in February 2022. Therefore, "2/Catorce" did not have a full run on the chart.)	22
Global 200 (Billboard)	43
Nicaragua (Monitor Latino)	3
Paraguay (Monitor Latino)	18
Peru Streaming (UNIMPRO)	8
Spain (Promusicae)	12
US Bubbling Under Hot 100 (Billboard)	23
US Hot Latin Songs (Billboard)	11

=== Monthly charts ===
Monthly chart position for " 2/Catorce"
Chart (2022)	Peak position
Paraguay (SGP)	19
Uruguay (CUDISCO)	7

=== Year-end charts ===
2021 year-end chart performance for "2/Catorce"
Chart (2021)	Position
Colombia (Monitor Latino)	38
Costa Rica (Monitor Latino)	59
Dominican Republic (Monitor Latino)	8
Global 200 (Billboard)	193
Honduras Urbano (Monitor Latino)	82
Latin America (Monitor Latino)	95
Nicaragua (Monitor Latino)	62
Paraguay (Monitor Latino)	43
Spain (PROMUSICAE)	32
US Hot Latin Songs (Billboard)	24

2022 year-end chart performance for "2/Catorce"
Chart (2022)	Position
Costa Rica Urbano (Monitor Latino)	85
Nicaragua (Monitor Latino)	16
Paraguay Urbano (Monitor Latino)	70

2023 year-end chart performance for "2/Catorce"
Chart (2023)	Position
Nicaragua Urbano (Monitor Latino)	100

== Certifications ==
Certifications and sales for "2/Catorce"
Region	Certification	Certified units/sales
Argentina (CAPIF)	Gold	10,000^{*}
Mexico (AMPROFON)	Diamond	700,000^{‡}
Spain (Promusicae)	3× Platinum	180,000^{‡}
United States (RIAA)	Platinum (Latin)	60,000^{‡}
Streaming
Central America (CFC)	3× Platinum	21,000,000^{†}
^{*} Sales figures based on certification alone.^{‡} Sales+streaming figures based on certification alone.^{†} Streaming-only figures based on certification alone.

== Release history ==
Release dates and formats for "2/Catorce"
Region	Date	Format(s)	Label	Ref.
Various	February 14, 2021	Digital download; streaming	Sony Music Latin; Duars Entertainment	
Latin America	February 26, 2021	Contemporary hit radio	Sony Music Latin; Duars Entertainment	

== See also ==
- 2021 in Latin music
