= Perreo Pesau' =

2020 song by Rauw Alejandro

Promotional single by Rauw Alejandro

from the album Afrodisíaco
- Language: Spanish
- Released: March 5, 2021
- Length: 4:20
- Label: Sony Latin; Duars
- Songwriters: Raúl Alejandro Ocasio Ruiz "Rauw Alejandro"; Ramón Ayala; Jorge E. Pizarro "Kenobi"; José M. Collazo "Colla"; Eric Pérez Rovira "Eric Duars"; Luis J. González "Mr. NaisGai"; Roberto Rafael; Rivera Elias "Yensanjuan"; Jorge Alvaro Diaz "Alvarito" Díaz
- Producers: Mr. Naisgai; El Zorro; Caleb Calloway

Rauw Alejandro Promotional singles chronology
"Algo Mágico" (2021)	"Perreo Pesau'" (2021)	"Desenfocao'" (2021)

Music video
- "Perreo Pesau'" on YouTube

"Perreo Pesau'" is a song recorded by Puerto Rican singer Rauw Alejandro for his debut studio album, Afrodisíaco (2020). The song was written by Alejandro, Kenobi, Colla, Eric Duars, Mr. NaisGai, Roberto Rafael, Yensanjuan, and Álvaro Díaz, while the production was handled by Mr. Naisgai, Alejandro, and Caleb Calloway. It was released for digital download and streaming by Sony Music Latin and Duars Entertainment on March 5, 2021, as the third promotional single from the album. A Spanish language mid-tempo reggaeton song, it is a tribute to early-2000s reggaeton.

"Perreo Pesau'" received positive reviews from music critics, who complimented its energy and lyrics. The song charted in Peru and was certified quadruple platinum in Colombia. An accompanying music video, released simultaneously with the song, was directed by Alfred Marroquín and filmed in Carolina. It depicts Alejandro dancing through various areas of the city. The song was included on the set lists for Alejandro's the Rauw Alejandro World Tour and the Vice Versa Tour.

== Background and composition ==
"Perreo Pesau'"
A 26-second sample of the chorus, which features a mid-tempo melody.

Rauw Alejandro announced that he was working on his debut studio album Afrodisíaco in February 2020. On November 2, 2020, he shared a video of himself dancing to a yet to be released song from the album and teased it: "Afrodisíaco has a lot of Perreo Pesau' [...]". One week later, Alejandro revealed the album's track list, including "Perreo Pesau'" as the 12th track. The album was released for digital download and streaming by Sony Music Latin and Duars Entertainment on November 13, 2020.

Musically, "Perreo Pesau'" is a Spanish language mid-tempo reggaeton song, and a tribute to early-2000s reggaeton. It was written by Alejandro, Kenobi, Colla, Eric Duars, Mr. NaisGai, Roberto Rafael, Yensanjuan, and Álvaro Díaz, with its production being handled by Mr. Naisgai, Alejandro, and Caleb Calloway. The track runs for a total of 4 minutes and 20 seconds. The lyrics include, "Las latinas en Miami / Esta noche no se prestan pa' nada / To' el mundo activa'o en los stories / Con esa tanguita tu no escondes nada / Pa' que te vean moviendo" (The Latinas in Miami / Tonight they don't lend themselves to anything / Everyone is active in the stories / With that panties you don't hide anything / So they can see you moving).

== Promotion and reception ==
A screenshot from the music video, depicting Alejandro dancing in a football pitch.

On March 3, 2021, Alejandro announced that an accompanying music video to "Perreo Pesau'" would be released in two days. On March 5, the song was released as the third promotional single from Afrodisíaco, with a music video directed by Alfred Marroquín and filmed in Carolina. The visual depicts Alejandro dancing through various areas of the city. As of April 2022, it has received over 100 million views on YouTube. The song was included on the set lists for Alejandro's the Rauw Alejandro World Tour and the Vice Versa Tour.

"Perreo Pesau'" was met with positive reviews from music critics. Los 40's Ignacio Videla praised the song's energy and thought it "definitely deserved his audiovisual piece". Also from Los 40, Laura Coca gave the track a positive review, saying it "invites us to give it our all without control with its reggaeton sounds and its catchy lyrics". The song peaked at number 216 on UNIMPRO's Peru Streaming chart and was certified quadruple platinum in Colombia. It was also certified gold in Central America by the Certificación Fonográfica Centroamericana (CFC) for receiving over 3,500,000 streams in the region. In 2024, it was certified gold by the Productores de Música de España (PROMUSICAE), for track-equivalent sales of over 30,000 units in Spain.

== Credits and personnel ==
Credits adapted from Tidal.

- Rauw Alejandro – associated performer, composer, lyricist, producer
- Ramón Ayala – composer, lyricist
- Jorge E. Pizarro "Kenobi" – composer, lyricist, recording engineer
- José M. Collazo "Colla" – composer, lyricist, mastering engineer, mixing engineer
- Eric Pérez Rovira "Eric Duars" – composer, lyricist, executive producer
- Luis J. González "Mr. NaisGai" – composer, lyricist, producer
- Roberto Rafael – composer, lyricist
- Rivera Elias "Yensanjuan" – composer, lyricist
- Jorge Alvaro Diaz "Alvarito" Díaz – composer, lyricist
- Caleb Calloway – producer
- Amber Rubi Urena – A&R coordinator
- John Eddie Pérez – A&R director

== Charts ==
Weekly peak performance for "Perreo Pesau'"
Chart (2020)	Peak position
Peru Streaming (UNIMPRO)	216

== Certifications ==
Certifications and sales for "Perreo Pesau'"
Region	Certification	Certified units/sales
Colombia	4× Platinum	
Spain (Promusicae)	Gold	30,000^{‡}
Streaming
Central America (CFC)	Gold	3,500,000^{†}
^{‡} Sales+streaming figures based on certification alone.^{†} Streaming-only figures based on certification alone.
