= Vice Versa Tour =

2022 concert tour by Rauw Alejandro

- Tour by Rauw Alejandro
- Location: North America; South America; Europe
- Associated album: Vice Versa
- Start date: January 15, 2022
- End date: June 11, 2022
- Legs: 5
- No. of shows: 26
- Supporting act(s): DVILA; Joonti; Pailita
- Producers: Elite & Media Marketing
- Attendance: 327,000
- Box office: $24.5 million

Rauw Alejandro concert chronology
- Rauw Alejandro World Tour (2021); Vice Versa Tour (2022); Saturno World Tour (2023)

The Vice Versa Tour was the third concert tour by Puerto Rican singer Rauw Alejandro, in support of his second studio album, Vice Versa (2021). It began on January 15, 2022 in Los Angeles and concluded on June 11 of that year in Barcelona, with several shows throughout United States, Latin America, and Spain. DVILA, Joonti, and Pailita served as supporting acts on the tour. The Vice Versa Tour sold over 327,000 tickets and grossed over $24.5 million.

== Background ==
On January 12, 2022, Rauw Alejandro formally announced the Vice Versa tour, with 25 shows across the United States, Latin America, and Spain from January 15 to June 11 of that same year. Tickets went on sale on the same day. On February 2, 2022, Alejandro announced a new Latin American date in Guayaquil, Ecuador. On February 16, 2022, he announced that he had been forced to postpone the dates in Movistar Arena in Santiago, Chile and Jockey Club del Perú in Lima, Peru to May 5 and 6, 2022, respectively, due to the COVID-19 pandemic restrictions in the countries; tickets purchased for the original shows were fully valid for the new dates, however there was a process of requesting the return of the money between February 16 and March 13. The April shows on the North American leg, which included seven dates, were retitled to the Rauw Arena Tour, with Puerto Rican singers DVILA and Joonti being announced as the opening acts of the tour. The tour is produced by Elite & Media Marketing (EMM). On April 27, 2022, Chilean singer Pailita was confirmed to be the opening act of the Movistar Arena show in Santiago.

== Critical reception ==
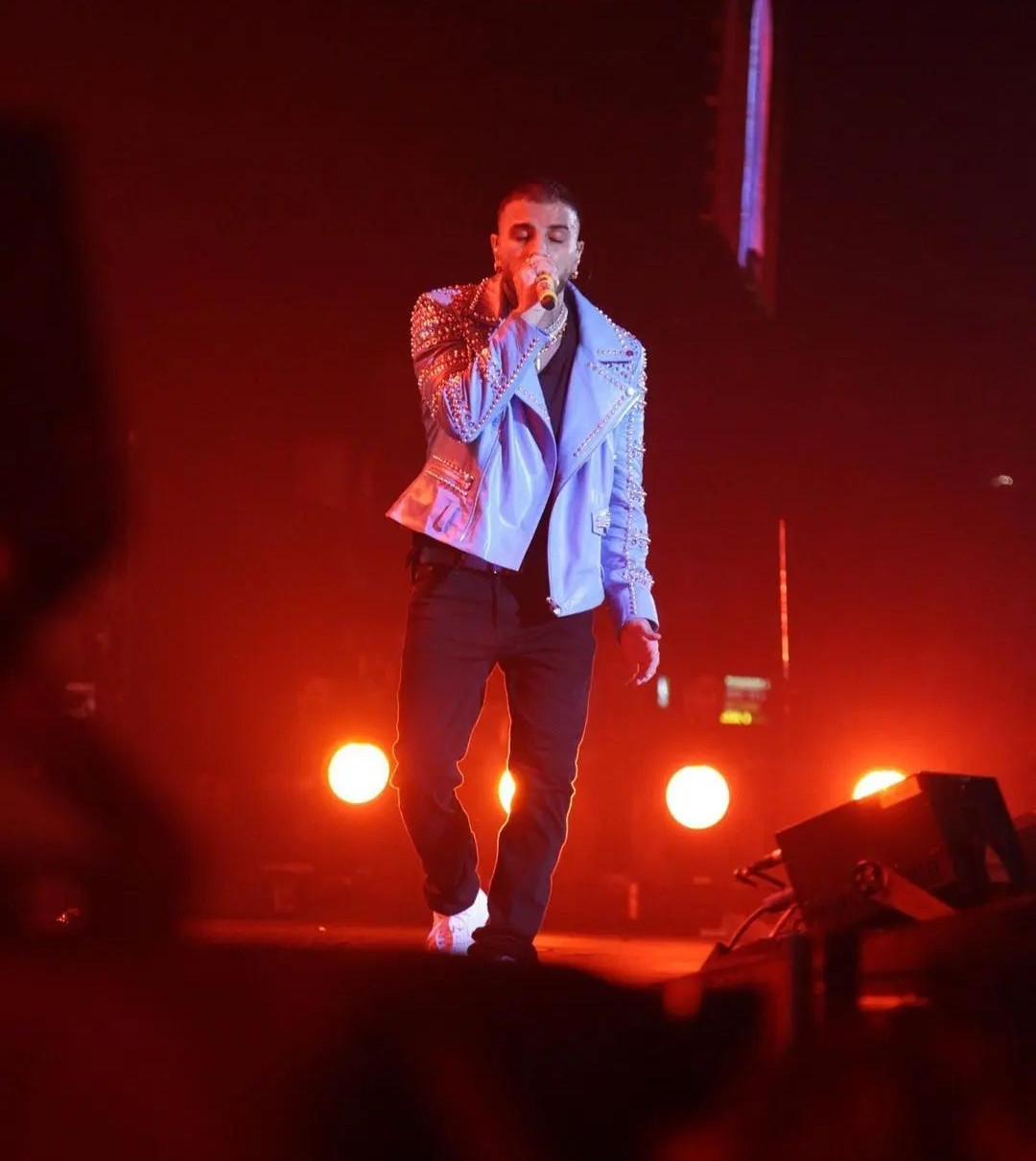
Alejandro performing "La Old Skul" on the Vice Versa Tour.

The Vice Versa Tour was met with highly positive reviews from critics. Writing for Latina, Lucas Villa called Alejandro an "incredible showman" and stated that he proves he is "the next big Latin pop star" on the tour. He added that "dancing is an integral part to the way Alejandro presents himself" in his performances. An author of Diario El Norte gave the Buenos Aires show a positive review, saying he "confirmed his excellent professional moment by shining in the concert he gave" at the Estadio Luna Park. Erwin Perez from El Nuevo Herald praised his performance at the FTX Arena, labeling it "a complete party". He continued: "Rauw doesn't give the public a break, he has a mastery of the stage and a sense of showmanship that avoids bumps." Sónica.mx critic Emily Paulin named his show in Monterrey one of "8 concerts and festivals in Monterrey that you cannot miss in 2022".

=== Accolades ===
The Vice Versa Tour was nominated for Concert/Tour of the Year at the 2022 Premios Tu Música Urbano, but lost to the Bichota Tour by Karol G.

== Commercial reception ==
The Vice Versa Tour sold over 327,000 tickets and grossed over $24.5 million.

== Set list ==
This set list is representative of the show on June 10, 2022, in Málaga. It is not representative of all concerts for the duration of the tour.

1. "Dile a Él"
2. "Mírame"
3. "El Efecto"
4. "Caprichoso"
5. "Enchule"
6. "Nubes"
7. "Fantasías"
8. "Pensándote"
9. "Problemón"
10. "Nostálgico"
11. "Tattoo"
12. "Perreo Pesau'"
13. "Loco por Perrearte (Remix)"
14. "La Old Skul"
15. "Cosa Guapa"
16. "Wuepa"
17. "Desenfocao'"
18. "Algo Mágico"
19. "Tiroteo (Remix)"
20. "Museo"
21. "Aquel Nap ZzZz"
22. "Cúrame"
23. "Dream Girl (Remix)"
24. "2/Catorce"
25. "Sexo Virtual"
26. "Reloj"
27. "Party"
28. "Desesperados"
29. "Todo de Ti"
30. "La Nota"

=== Special guests ===
Alejandro surprised fans throughout the tour with special guests, performing his collaborations with them.

- February 18, 2022 – Buenos Aires: Cazzu, María Becerra, and Nicki Nicole
- April 9, 2022 – Miami: Anuel AA, De La Ghetto, and Nio García
- April 29, 2022 – Panama City: Sech

== Shows ==
List of North American concerts
| Date (2022) | City | Country | Venue | Opening acts | Attendance | Revenue |
|---|---|---|---|---|---|---|
| January 15 (Note: This concert was a part of Calibash 2022 Latin Urban Festival.) | Los Angeles | United States | Crypto.com Arena | — | | |
| January 20 (Note: This concert was a part of NEON Music Festival 2022.) | Cancún | Mexico | Grand Oasis Cancun | — | | |

List of Latin American concerts
| Date (2022) | City | Country | Venue | Opening acts | Attendance | Revenue |
|---|---|---|---|---|---|---|
| February 18 | Buenos Aires | Argentina | Estadio Luna Park | — | | |
| February 19 (Note: This concert was a part of La Solar Festival 2022.) | Medellín | Colombia | Parque Norte | — | | |
| February 25 | Cali | Colombia | Estadio Olímpico Pascual Guerrero | — | | |
| February 26 (Note: This concert was a part of La Liga del Perreo.) | Bogotá | Colombia | Green Forest | — | | |
| February 27 | Barranquilla | Colombia | Puerta de Oro | — | | |
| February 28 (Note: This concert was a part of Nonstop The Madness Festival.) | Cochabamba | Bolivia | Feicobol | — | | |
| March 23 | Monterrey | Mexico | Arena Monterrey | — | 48,312 / 48,312 | $1,660,000 |
| March 24 | Guadalajara | Mexico | Telmex Auditorium | — | 48,312 / 48,312 | $1,660,000 |
| March 26 | Mexico City | Mexico | Mexico City Arena | — | 48,312 / 48,312 | $1,660,000 |

List of North American concerts
| Date (2022) | City | Country | Venue | Opening acts | Attendance | Revenue |
|---|---|---|---|---|---|---|
| April 2 | Brooklyn | United States | Barclays Center | DVILA; Joonti | 73,882 / 73,882 | $7,779,879 |
| April 9 | Miami | United States | FTX Arena | DVILA; Joonti | 73,882 / 73,882 | $7,779,879 |
| April 14 | San Diego | United States | Pechanga Arena | DVILA; Joonti | 73,882 / 73,882 | $7,779,879 |
| April 15 | Fresno | United States | Save Mart Center | DVILA; Joonti | 73,882 / 73,882 | $7,779,879 |
| April 16 | Inglewood | United States | The Forum | DVILA; Joonti | 73,882 / 73,882 | $7,779,879 |
| April 22 | Chicago | United States | Allstate Arena | DVILA; Joonti | 73,882 / 73,882 | $7,779,879 |
| April 24 | San Jose | United States | SAP Center | DVILA; Joonti | 73,882 / 73,882 | $7,779,879 |

List of Latin American concerts
| Date (2022) | City | Country | Venue | Opening acts | Attendance | Revenue |
|---|---|---|---|---|---|---|
| April 28 | Panama City | Panama | Estadio Emilio Royo | — | | |
| April 29 | Guayaquil | Ecuador | Estadio Modelo Alberto Spencer Herrera | — | | |
| April 30 (Note: This concert was a part of Picnic Festival Costa Rica 2022.) | San José | Costa Rica | Centro de Eventos Pedregal | — | | |
| May 5 (Note: The concert on May 5, 2022 in Santiago was previously scheduled for March 3, 2022, being rescheduled due to the COVID-19 pandemic restrictions.) | Santiago | Chile | Movistar Arena | Pailita | | |
| May 6 (Note: The concert on May 6, 2022 in Lima was previously scheduled for March 8, 2022, being rescheduled due to the COVID-19 pandemic restrictions.) | Lima | Peru | Jockey Club del Perú | — | | |
| May 7 | Asunción | Paraguay | Espacio IDESA | — | | |

List of European concerts
| Date (2022) | City | Country | Venue | Opening acts | Attendance | Revenue |
|---|---|---|---|---|---|---|
| June 10 | Málaga | Spain | Marenostrum Castle Park | — | | |
| June 11 (Note: This concert was a part of Oh My Gol LaLiga Music Experience.) | Barcelona | Spain | RCDE Stadium | — | | |
