= Sexo Virtual =

2021 single by Rauw Alejandro

Single by Rauw Alejandro

from the album Vice Versa
- Language: Spanish
- English title: "Virtual Sex"
- Released: June 25, 2021
- Genre: Reggaeton; electronic
- Length: 3:28
- Label: Sony
- Songwriters: Marcos Masís "Tainy"; Emmanuel Sosa; Alberto Carlos Melendez; Jorge E. Pizarro "Kenobi"; José M. Collazo "Colla"; Eric Pérez Rovira "Eric Duars"; Raúl Alejandro Ocasio Ruiz "Rauw Alejandro"; Jorge Álvaro Díaz "Álvarito"
- Producers: Albert Hype; Tainy

Rauw Alejandro singles chronology
| "Todo de Ti" (2021) | "Sexo Virtual" (2021) | "Cambia el Paso" (2021) |

Music video
- "Sexo Virtual" on YouTube

"Sexo Virtual" (transl. "Virtual Sex") is a song recorded by Puerto Rican singer Rauw Alejandro for his second studio album, Vice Versa (2021). It was written by Tainy, Emmanuel Sosa, Alberto Carlos Melendez, Kenobi, Colla, Eric Duars, Alejandro, and Álvaro Díaz, while the production was handled by Albert Hype and Tainy. The song was released by Sony Music on June 25, 2021, as the third single from the album. A Spanish language reggaeton and electronic perreo, it is an erotic song about overcoming distance, bringing the bodies together, with the singer exposing some of his deepest fantasies.

"Sexo Virtual" received positive reviews from music critics, who complimented its lyrics. The track was commercially successful, reaching number one in El Salvador, Guatemala, Honduras, and Panama. It debuted in the top 20 of the Billboard Hot Latin Songs chart and was certified platinum in both Mexico and Spain. The accompanying music video was directed by Nuno Gomes and depicts an illusional futuristic virtual reality experience.

== Background and release ==
Alejandro released his debut studio album, Afrodisíaco, on November 13, 2020. Two weeks after finishing the work on Afrodisíaco, he started working on his second studio album, Vice Versa. The latter was released for digital download and streaming by Sony Music Latin and Duars Entertainment on June 25, 2021, and "Sexo Virtual" was included as the second track. On the same day, the song was picked as the third single promoting the project, issued by Sony Music to Latin American radio airplay.

== Music and lyrics ==
"Sexo Virtual"
A 20-second sample of the chorus

Musically, "Sexo Virtual" is a Spanish language reggaeton and electronic perreo. The song was written by Tainy, Emmanuel Sosa, Alberto Carlos Melendez, Kenobi, Colla, Eric Duars, Alejandro, and Álvaro Díaz. Its production was handled by Albert Hype and Tainy, and the track runs for a total of 3 minutes and 28 seconds. Lyrically, "Sexo Virtual" which translates to "Virtual Sex" in English, is an erotic song about "overcoming distance, bringing the bodies together", with Alejandro exposing "some of his deepest fantasies". The lyrics include, "Esta noche por video / Pendiente, que te vo' a llamar / Nos vemos y el bellaqueo / Lo terminamos con sexo virtual" (Tonight by video / Pending, I'm going to call you / See you and do the bellaqueo / We end it with virtual sex). The Fader's Lucas Villa compared the song with "Digital Get Down" by NSYNC, noting it for "breaking down love-making in the streaming era".

== Critical reception ==
"Sexo Virtual" has been met with positive reviews from music critics. In 2022, Ernesto Lechner from Rolling Stone ranked the track as Alejandro's 16th-best song, highlighting "the tension in the lyrics". Also from Rolling Stone, Lucas Villa described the song as "alluring". Lindsay Weinberg from E! Online called its lyrics "steamy", saying that he "turned up the heat" for the song.

== Commercial performance ==
"Sexo Virtual" debuted and peaked at number 20 on the US Billboard Hot Latin Songs chart on July 10, 2021, becoming Alejandro's 18th entry. The song also debuted at number 22 on Spain's official weekly chart on July 4, 2021. The following week, it reached its peak of number 19. It was later certified double platinum by the Productores de Música de España (PROMUSICAE), for track-equivalent sales of over 120,000 units in the country. In Latin America, "Sexo Virtual" reached number one in El Salvador, Guatemala, Honduras, and Panama. In Mexico, the song was certified platinum by the Asociación Mexicana de Productores de Fonogramas y Videogramas (AMPROFON), for track-equivalent sales of over 140,000 units.

== Promotion ==
=== Music video ===
A screenshot from the music video, depicting Alejandro fixing a virtual reality headset on his head.

An accompanying music video was released simultaneously with the song. The visual was directed by Nuno Gomes and depicts an illusional futuristic virtual reality experience. In an interview with E! Online, Alejandro stated that it "is truly mind blowing and fun", with them having "a blast shooting it".

=== Live performances ===
The song was included on the set lists for Alejandro's the Rauw Alejandro World Tour and the Vice Versa Tour.

== Credits and personnel ==
Credits adapted from Tidal.

- Rauw Alejandro – associated performer, composer, lyricist
- Marcos Masís "Tainy" – producer, composer, lyricist
- Emmanuel Sosa – composer, lyricist
- Alberto Carlos Melendez – composer, lyricist
- Jorge E. Pizarro "Kenobi" – composer, lyricist, recording engineer
- José M. Collazo "Colla" – composer, lyricist, mastering engineer, mixing engineer
- Eric Pérez Rovira "Eric Duars" – composer, lyricist
- Jorge Álvaro Díaz "Álvarito" – composer, lyricist
- Albert Hype – producer

== Charts ==
=== Weekly charts ===
Weekly peak performance for "Sexo Virtual"
| Chart (2021) | Peak position |
|---|---|
| Argentina Hot 100 (Billboard) | 96 |
| El Salvador (Monitor Latino) | 1 |
| Global Excl. US (Billboard) | 178 |
| Guatemala (Monitor Latino) | 1 |
| Honduras (Monitor Latino) | 1 |
| Panama (Monitor Latino) | 1 |
| Peru Streaming (UNIMPRO) | 56 |
| Spain (Promusicae) | 19 |
| US Hot Latin Songs (Billboard) | 20 |

=== Year-end charts ===
2021 year-end chart performance for "Sexo Virtual"
| Chart (2021) | Position |
|---|---|
| El Salvador (Monitor Latino) | 89 |
| Guatemala (Monitor Latino) | 67 |
| Honduras (Monitor Latino) | 31 |
| Panama Urbano (Monitor Latino) | 70 |

2022 year-end chart performance for "Sexo Virtual"
| Chart (2022) | Position |
|---|---|
| Honduras Urbano (Monitor Latino) | 74 |

== Certifications ==
Certifications and sales for "Sexo Virtual"
| Region | Certification | Certified units/sales |
|---|---|---|
| Mexico (AMPROFON) | 3× Platinum+Gold | 490,000^{‡} |
| Spain (Promusicae) | 2× Platinum | 120,000^{‡} |
Streaming
| Central America (CFC) | Platinum | 7,000,000^{†} |
^{‡} Sales+streaming figures based on certification alone.^{†} Streaming-only figures based on certification alone.

== Release history ==
Release dates and formats for "Sexo Virtual"
| Region | Date | Format(s) | Label | Ref. |
|---|---|---|---|---|
| Latin America | June 25, 2021 | Contemporary hit radio | Sony Music | |
