= Aquel Nap ZzZz =

2021 song by Rauw Alejandro

Song by Rauw Alejandro

from the album Vice Versa
- Language: Spanish
- Released: June 25, 2021
- Genre: Latin trap; bolero
- Length: 4:55
- Label: Sony Latin; Duars
- Songwriter: Raúl A. Ocasio Ruiz "Rauw Alejandro"
- Producers: Orteez; El Zorro "Rauw Alejandro"; Alvarito; Mr. Naisgai

Audio
- "Aquel Nap ZzZz" on YouTube

"Aquel Nap ZzZz" (transl. "That Nap ZzZz") is a song recorded by Puerto Rican singer Rauw Alejandro. It is the sixth track on his second studio album, Vice Versa (2021), which was released on June 25, 2021. The song was written by Alejandro, while the production was handled by Orteez, Alejandro, Alvarito, and Mr. Naisgai. A Spanish language trap-bolero ballad, with elements of R&B and reggaeton, it is a romantic love song that Alejandro dedicated to his girlfriend Rosalía.

"Aquel Nap ZzZz" received widely positive reviews from music critics, who complimented its lyrics and the singer's vocals. The song charted in Spain and Billboard's Hot Latin Songs in the United States. The song was included on the set lists for Alejandro's 2021 World Tour and the Vice Versa Tour; during several shows, he has expressed his love to Rosalía while singing the song, which has been noted by the media.

== Background and composition ==
"Aquel Nap ZzZz"
A 29-second sample of the chorus

Alejandro released his debut studio album, Afrodisíaco, on November 13, 2020. Two weeks after finishing the work on Afrodisíaco, he started working on his second studio album, Vice Versa. The latter was released for digital download and streaming by Sony Music Latin and Duars Entertainment on June 25, 2021, and "Aquel Nap ZzZz" was included as the sixth track.

Musically, "Aquel Nap ZzZz" is a Spanish language trap-bolero ballad, with elements of R&B and reggaeton; the song begins as an urban song fusing trap with reggaeton, until it appears with an acoustic guitar, becoming a bolero. The track runs for a total of 4 minutes and 55 seconds, with its production being handled by Orteez, Alejandro, Alvarito, and Mr. Naisgai. Written by Alejandro, "Aquel Nap ZzZz" is a romantic love song dedicated to his girlfriend Rosalía. The song includes Rosalía's vocals and was inspired by their relationship. Alejandro stated that although "not all the songs are about her specifically", this song is "literally for her". The lyrics include, "No te dejo de mirar / Eres mi niña de cristal / Te juro que yo mato por ti" (I can't stop looking at you / You are my crystal girl / I swear that I would kill for you). During an interview with Los 40, Rosalía admitted that it is her favorite song by Alejandro.

== Critical reception ==
Upon release, "Aquel Nap ZzZz" was met with positive reviews from music critics. Writing for The New York Times, Isabelia Herrera praised Alejandro's vocals for their "honeyed textures" that "set him apart from pop-reggaeton vocalists whose melodies tend to overflow with cloying sentimentality". La Capital staff labeled him "an expert in the art of contrasts", noting how he blends multiple genres in the track. Billboard critic Jessica Roiz described its lyrics as "heartfelt", while Maria Loreto from ¡Hola! named it "one of his most romantic" songs. In his review for Latina, Lucas Villa called the track "irresistible". Mondo Sonoro's Luis M. Maínez stated that it has "the best song title" he had "seen in recent years". He continued admiring the song as "an exhibition of musical talent" by the singer "who has been crowned number 1 in world reggaeton nowadays".

== Commercial performance ==
Driven by Vice Versa's release, "Aquel Nap ZzZz" opened at number 48 on the US Billboard Hot Latin Songs on July 10, 2021, becoming Alejandro's 18th entry and the album's only non-single track to enter the chart. It re-entered the chart at a new peak of 37 on January 8, 2022, as it gained popularity on December 24, due to its lyrics referring to the date: "Tú mi 24 de diciembre" (transl. "You're my 24 of December"). "Aquel Nap ZzZz" gained further popularity during the 2025 holiday season, reaching a new peak of 27 on the chart dated January 3, 2026. The song also debuted at number 82 on Spain's official weekly chart on July 4, 2021, amongst the album's eight tracks to chart inside the top 100. The following week, it reached its peak of number 64; the track charted for a total of 10 non-consecutive weeks. It was later certified platinum by the Productores de Música de España (PROMUSICAE), for track-equivalent sales of over 60,000 units in the country.

== Live performances ==
The song was included on the set list for Alejandro's the Rauw Alejandro World Tour and the Vice Versa Tour. During several shows, Alejandro has expressed his love to Rosalía while singing the song, with phrases such as "Rosalía, my love, I love you" and "Rosalía mami I love you", which has been noted by the media.

== Credits and personnel ==
Credits adapted from Tidal.

- Rauw Alejandro – associated performer, composer, lyricist, producer
- Orteez – producer
- Alvarito – producer
- Mr. Naisgai – producer
- José M. Collazo "Colla" – mastering engineer, mixing engineer
- Jorge E. Pizarro "Kenobi" – recording engineer
- Carlos Orlando Navarro – guitar

== Charts ==
=== Weekly charts ===
Weekly peak performance for "Aquel Nap ZzZz"
Chart (2021–2026)	Peak position
Peru Streaming (UNIMPRO)	40
Spain (Promusicae)	64
US Hot Latin Songs (Billboard)	27

=== Year-end charts ===
2021 year-end chart performance for "Aquel Nap ZzZz"
Chart (2021)	Position
Dominican Republic Urbano (Monitor Latino)	59

== Certifications ==
Certifications and sales for "Aquel Nap ZzZz"
Region	Certification	Certified units/sales
Mexico (AMPROFON)	3× Platinum+Gold	490,000^{‡}
Spain (Promusicae)	Platinum	60,000^{‡}
^{‡} Sales+streaming figures based on certification alone.
