= Cúrame (Rauw Alejandro song) =

2021 single by Rauw Alejandro

Single by Rauw Alejandro

from the album Vice Versa
- Language: Spanish
- English title: "Heal Me"
- Released: August 27, 2021
- Genre: Lofi hip hop; reggaeton
- Length: 2:44
- Label: Sony
- Songwriter: Raúl Alejandro Ocasio Ruiz "Rauw Alejandro"
- Producers: Kenobi; Charlie Handsome

Rauw Alejandro singles chronology
"Loquita" (2021)	"Cúrame" (2021)	"Nostálgico" (2021)

Music video
- "Cúrame" on YouTube

"Cúrame" (transl. "Heal Me") is a song recorded by Puerto Rican singer Rauw Alejandro for his second studio album, Vice Versa (2021). It was written by Alejandro, while the production was handled by Kenobi and Charlie Handsome. The song was released by Sony Music on August 27, 2021, as the fourth single from the album. A Spanish language lofi hip hop reggaeton ballad with urban and tropical rhythms, it narrates a love story that refers to two relationships; the current one and the one from the past, which continues to leave its mark today.

"Cúrame" received positive reviews from music critics, who complimented its style and lyrics. The track was commercially successful, reaching number one in Colombia and Dominican Republic, as well as the top three in Spain. It also reached the summit of the Billboard's Latin Airplay and Latin Rhythm Airplay charts in the United States. The song has received several certifications, including sextuple platinum in Spain. An accompanying music video, released on September 16, 2021, was directed by Nuno Gomes and received critical acclaim. It depicts Alejandro turning into an angel whose wings are on fire. To promote the song, Alejandro performed it at the 2022 Billboard Music Awards.

== Background and release ==
Alejandro released his debut studio album, Afrodisíaco, on November 13, 2020. Two weeks after finishing the work on Afrodisíaco, he started working on his second studio album, Vice Versa. The latter was released for digital download and streaming by Sony Music Latin and Duars Entertainment on June 25, 2021, and "Cúrame" was included as the seventh track. After going viral on TikTok and achieving commercial success, it was released to radio stations on August 27, 2021, as the fourth single from the album.

== Music and lyrics ==
"Cúrame"
A 16-second sample of the chorus, which features urban rhythms.

Musically, "Cúrame" is a Spanish language lofi hip hop reggaeton ballad, with urban and tropical rhythms. The song was written by Alejandro and its production was handled by Kenobi and Charlie Handsome. The track runs for a total of two minutes and 44 seconds. Lyrically, "Cúrame" which translates to "Heal Me" in English, narrates a love story that refers to two relationships; the current one and the one from the past, which continues to leave its mark today. It expresses "a night of sex with a bodacious stranger as the surefire cure for a broken heart". The lyrics include, "Hace unos días me caí del cielo / Tú no ere' ella, pero te deseo / Quédate cerca de mí, ven, cúrame esta noche" (A few days ago I fell from the sky / You're not her, but I want you / Stay close to me, Come heal me tonight).

== Critical reception ==
Upon release, "Cúrame" was met with positive reviews from music critics. Happy FM staff gave the track a positive review and labeled it "a song in the purest Rauw Alejandro style", while praising its "catchy lyrics". They stated that the song represents the singer "with a new musical style, while maintaining his essence". Los 40's Raul Vazquez noted its "tremendous reception" and Lucia Castillo from Okdiario wrote that "he has once again conquered his fans" with "Cúrame". In 2022, Fuse ranked it as Alejandro's fifth-top song. In the same year, Ernesto Lechner from Rolling Stone ranked the track as the singer's sixth-best song, saying it "embodies Rauw's cosmopolitan smoothness" and "his voice floats at the very center of the mix".

=== Accolades ===
"Cúrame" was acknowledged as an award-winning song at the 2023 ASCAP Latin Awards.

== Commercial performance ==
"Cúrame" debuted at number 44 on the US Billboard Hot Latin Songs chart on August 28, 2021, becoming Alejandro's 23rd entry. On November 20, 2021, the track reached its peak of number 18. The song also peaked at number one on both the Latin Airplay and Latin Rhythm Airplay charts on March 5, 2022. Thus it became the singer's eighth crowning hit on both. Following the release of Vice Versa, "Cúrame" debuted at number 72 on Spain's official weekly chart on July 4, 2021, as an album track. It subsequently peaked at number three on August 22, 2021, giving Alejandro his fifth top-three hit in the country. It was later certified sextuple platinum by the Productores de Música de España (PROMUSICAE), for track-equivalent sales of over 360,000 units in the country. In Latin America, "Cúrame" reached number one in Colombia and Dominican Republic. It also peaked in the top 10 of Ecuador and Puerto Rico, as well as the top 20 in Argentina, El Salvador, Latin America, and Uruguay. In Mexico, the song peaked at number 31 on Mexico Airplay and was certified double platinum by the Asociación Mexicana de Productores de Fonogramas y Videogramas (AMPROFON), for track-equivalent sales of over 280,000 units.

== Promotion ==
=== Music video ===
A screenshot from the music video, depicting Alejandro as an angel with his wings on fire.

On September 14, 2021, Alejandro announced the fulfillment of the production of an accompanying music video on Twitter. The visual, directed by Nuno Gomes, was released two days later. It depicts Alejandro turning into an angel whose wings are on fire, matching its lyrics, saying that "he fell from heaven". Immediately, he appears mounted on a high-speed motorcycle, along with a woman. Lucia Castillo from Okdiario stated that it is probably one of Alejandro's "most spectacular" videos to date, highlighting its "special effects, rhythm and a story that seems like a movie". Los 40's Raul Vazquez described the visual as "hot", saying it is "one of the most striking aspects" of the song.

=== Live performances ===
Alejandro gave a live performance of "Desenfocao'" and "Cúrame" in a special two-song set with Billboard and Honda Stage. For the latter, he wore a red-and-black suit with a "matching band of eye makeup". On May 15, 2022, he performed a medley of "Cúrame", "Museo", and "Todo de Ti" at the 2022 Billboard Music Awards. During the performance of "Cúrame", he was sitting pensively "in front of a tree with a lighted trunk". Billboard critic Jessica Roiz described his performance as "energetic" and wrote: "In true Rauw fashion, his killer dance moves were the center of attention and had the crowd on its feet." The song was included on the set lists for Alejandro's the Rauw Alejandro World Tour and the Vice Versa Tour.

== Credits and personnel ==
Credits adapted from Tidal.

- Rauw Alejandro – associated performer, composer, lyricist
- Jorge E. Pizarro "Kenobi" – associated performer, producer
- Charlie Handsome – producer, guitar, recording engineer
- José M. Collazo "Colla" – mastering engineer, mixing engineer

== Charts ==
=== Weekly charts ===
Weekly peak performance for "Cúrame"
Chart (2021–2022)	Peak position
Argentina Hot 100 (Billboard)	15
Colombia (Monitor Latino)	1
Colombia (National-Report)	4
Costa Rica Urbano (Monitor Latino)	14
Dominican Republic (Monitor Latino)	1
Ecuador (Monitor Latino)	10
El Salvador (Monitor Latino)	20
Global 200 (Billboard)	71
Latin America (Monitor Latino)	19
Mexico Airplay (Billboard)	31
Peru Urbano (Monitor Latino)	14
Puerto Rico (Monitor Latino)	9
Spain (Promusicae)	3
US Hot Latin Songs (Billboard)	18
US Latin Airplay (Billboard)	1
US Latin Rhythm Airplay (Billboard)	1

=== Monthly charts ===
Monthly chart position for "Cúrame"
Chart (2021–2022)	Peak position
Paraguay (SGP)	67
Uruguay (CUDISCO)	4

=== Year-end charts ===
2021 year-end chart performance for "Cúrame"
Chart (2021)	Position
Costa Rica Urbano (Monitor Latino)	66
Dominican Republic (Monitor Latino)	40
Latin America (Monitor Latino)	95
Spain (PROMUSICAE)	15
US Hot Latin Songs (Billboard)	95

2022 year-end chart performance for "Cúrame"
Chart (2022)	Position
Dominican Republic Urbano (Monitor Latino)	73
Paraguay Urbano (Monitor Latino)	63
Peru Urbano (Monitor Latino)	97
Puerto Rico Urbano (Monitor Latino)	56
Spain (PROMUSICAE)	76
US Latin Airplay (Billboard)	31
US Latin Rhythm Airplay (Billboard)	18

== Certifications ==
Certifications and sales for "Cúrame"
Region	Certification	Certified units/sales
Italy (FIMI)	Gold	50,000^{‡}
Mexico (AMPROFON)	3× Platinum+Gold	490,000^{‡}
Spain (Promusicae)	7× Platinum	420,000^{‡}
Streaming
Central America (CFC)	2× Platinum	14,000,000^{†}
^{‡} Sales+streaming figures based on certification alone.^{†} Streaming-only figures based on certification alone.

== Release history ==
Release dates and formats for "Cúrame"
Region	Date	Format(s)	Label	Ref.
Latin America	Ausgut 27, 2021	Contemporary hit radio	Sony Music	
Italy	Ausgut 27, 2021	Contemporary hit radio	Sony Music	

== See also ==
- List of best-selling singles in Spain
- List of Billboard Hot Latin Songs and Latin Airplay number ones of 2022
