= Vice Versa (Rauw Alejandro album) =

Studio album by Rauw Alejandro
- Released: June 25, 2021
- Genres: Electropop; house; reggaeton; Latin pop; bolero; Brazilian funk
- Length: 47:39
- Language: Spanish
- Labels: Sony Latin; Duars
- Producers: Rauw Alejandro "El Zorro"; Caleb Calloway; Tainy; Mr. Naisgai; Kenobi; Dulce como Candy; Dímelo Ninow; Albert Hype; Orteez; Álvarito; Charlie Handsome; Eydren con el Ritmo; Manu Lara; Phantom

Rauw Alejandro chronology
Afrodisíaco (2020)	Vice Versa (2021)	Trap Cake, Vol. 2 (2022)

Singles from Vice Versa
- 1. "2/Catorce" Released: February 14, 2021; 2. "Todo de Ti" Released: May 20, 2021; 3. "Sexo Virtual" Released: June 25, 2021; 4. "Cúrame" Released: August 27, 2021; 5. "Desesperados" Released: December 9, 2021

Vice Versa (stylized in all caps) is the second studio album by Puerto Rican singer Rauw Alejandro. It was released on June 25, 2021, by Sony Music Latin and Duars Entertainment. Two weeks after finalizing his debut studio album, Afrodisíaco (2020), Alejandro started recording his sophomore album, going experimental on it and having a departure from his signature music styles. He worked with several producers, including Tainy, Caleb Calloway, and Mr. Naisgai to create the album. Musically, Vice Versa consists of electropop and house tracks, reggaeton songs, Latin pop numbers, bolero lines, and Brazilian funk rhythms. After the album's release, Alejandro embarked on the Rauw Alejandro World Tour and the Vice Versa Tour in 2021 and 2022, respectively.

The album was supported by five singles: "2/Catorce", "Todo de Ti", "Sexo Virtual", "Cúrame", and "Desesperados". The global hit "Todo de Ti" topped the charts in 18 countries and reached the top three on Billboard's Hot Latin Songs and Billboard Global 200 charts, becoming the third all-Spanish song in history to reach the top three on the latter. The song was nominated for both Record of the Year and Song of the Year at the 22nd Annual Latin Grammy Awards. "Desesperados" peaked at number one in nine countries, as well as the top five on Hot Latin Songs. "Todo de Ti", "Cúrame", and "Desesperados" all reached the summit of the Latin Airplay and Latin Rhythm Airplay charts in the United States.

Vice Versa received generally favorable reviews from music critics, who complimented its various genres and the singer's versatility. Rolling Stone ranked the album as the best Spanish-language or bilingual album of 2021 and the third-best album of the year. It was nominated for Favorite Latin Album at the American Music Awards and Top Latin Album at the Billboard Music Awards, both in 2022. The album was a commercial success. It debuted atop the US Top Latin Albums and Latin Rhythm Albums with first-week sales of 21,000 units. It has also spent 54 weeks on Billboard 200, making it the sixth Spanish album in history to spend more weeks on the chart. Additionally, Vice Versa spent nine weeks at number one in Spain. The album has received several certifications, including octuple platinum (Latin) in the United States.

== Background and recording ==
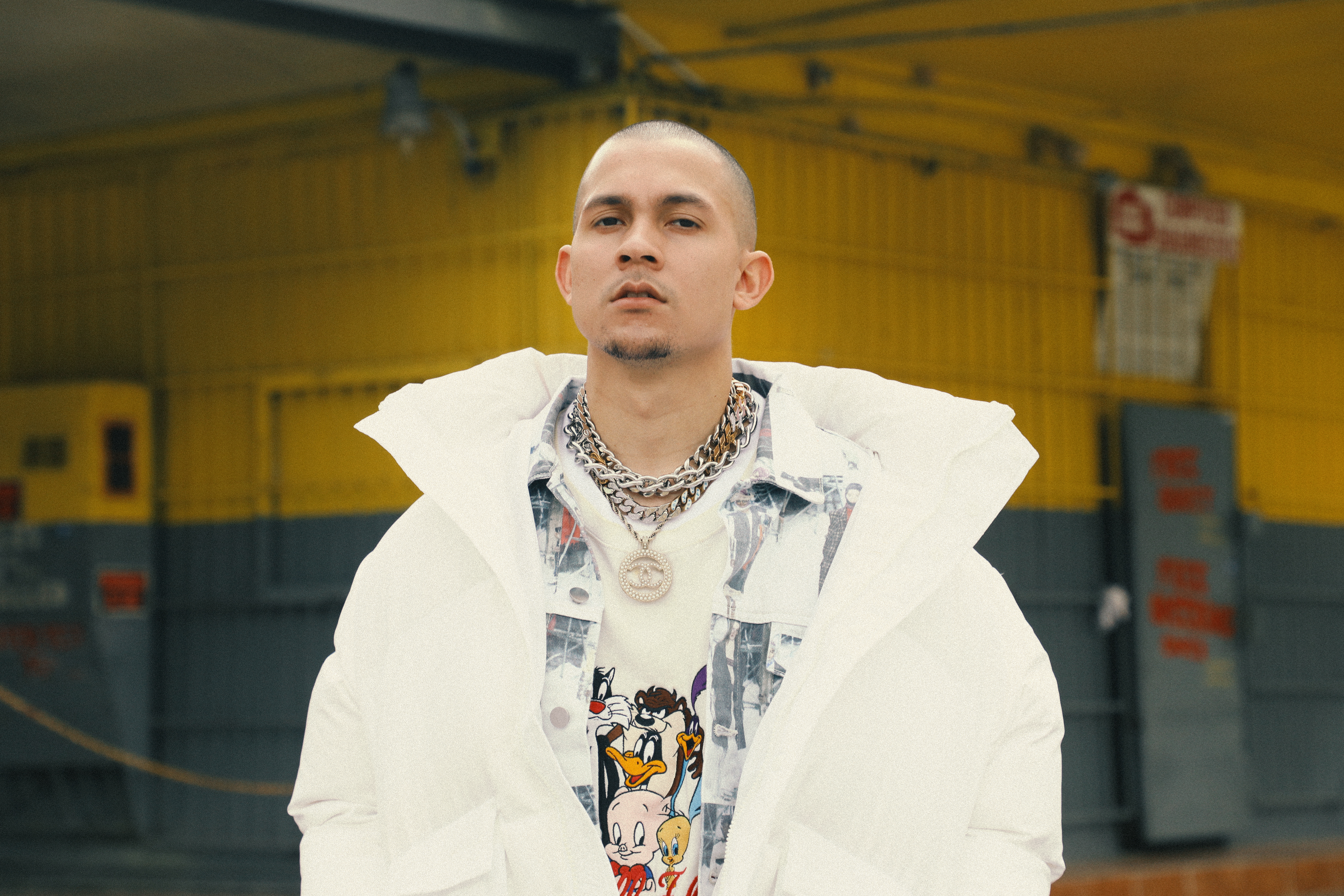
Tainy (pictured) produced four songs for the album.

Rauw Alejandro released his debut studio album, Afrodisíaco on November 13, 2020. The album experienced both critical and commercial success, being nominated for Best Música Urbana Album at the 64th Annual Grammy Awards. Two weeks after finishing the work on Afrodisíaco, he started working on his sophomore studio album, Vice Versa. On the latter, he got a departure from his "signature reggaeton and Latin R&B", going "experimental". During an interview with Billboard, he explained:

I like to get out of my comfort zone. That's what makes me happy, to be able to explore, expand and grow. I don’t judge any artist that wants to follow their line but in my case, I don’t like getting boxed in a certain type of genre. I want to experiment with the most that I can in my career and aim to become that complete artist.

Alejandro added that he tries to connect with his fans in every project that he does, by putting his "heart and soul on the table" and expressing his "art to the maximum". In an interview with Vice, he told the magazine that he does not like to repeat projects and the things he does: "If we play a lot of music of that genre, people get saturated, we always have to give them a break so that when they come back again, they'll come back strong." He also wanted the album to be "more personal" than Afrodisíaco and reduced the number of collaborations on it. He worked on Vice Versa with the assistance of several producers, including Tainy, Caleb Calloway, Álvaro Díaz, and Mr. Naisgai. In an interview with Rolling Stone, Calloway stated that Alejandro was "planning to make something like Vice Versa for years", and since Afrodisíaco "was his first big project", the team "wanted to make sure [they] had a more commercial approach". He added: "The next album, we wanted it to be more experimental."

== Music and lyrics ==
"La Old Skul"
A 21-second sample of the chorus of "La Old Skul", which nods to the old-school reggaeton and its perreo roots, sampling "En la Cama" by Nicky Jam and Daddy Yankee with an electronic update.

Vice Versa is a Spanish language album composed of 14 songs, consisting electropop and house tracks, reggaeton songs, Latin pop numbers, bolero lines, and Brazilian funk rhythms. Lyrically, the album is divided into three facets; it begins with love songs, then there are breakup and heartbreak lyrics, and eventually a recovery and healing. "Todo de Ti" (transl. "Everything About You") is a dance-pop and electropop song, with elements of disco, pop, Latin pop, dance, electro, and nu-new-wave. The track was inspired by funk from the music of singers James Brown and Bruno Mars, as well as "the nostalgia of the 1980s". is a romantic song about a girl who drives Alejandro crazy and makes his heart race, while the hopeless singer confesses he likes everything about her. A reggaeton and electronic perreo, "Sexo Virtual" (transl. "Virtual Sex") is an erotic song about "overcoming distance, bringing the bodies together", with Alejandro exposing "some of his deepest fantasies".

In "Nubes" (transl. "Clouds"), which is a reggaeton and pop song with elements of electronic music, Alejandro declares his eternal love to the girl who has won his heart. A collaboration with Puerto Rican singer Chencho Corleone, "Desesperados" (transl. "Desperate") is an upbeat reggaeton song, with elements of cumbia and dembow, about two people who are apart, but still have love for each other, so they somehow try to get back together. An Urbano Latin R&B song, "2/Catorce" (transl. "2/Fourteen") is about passionate and sexual moments as a couple, and situations where the temperature rises. The trap-bolero ballad "Aquel Nap ZzZz" (transl. "That Nap ZzZz"), features elements of R&B and reggaeton, and is a romantic love song dedicated to Alejandro's girlfriend Rosalía. The song includes Rosalía's vocals and was inspired by their relationship.

"Cúrame" (transl. "Heal Me") is a lofi hip hop reggaeton ballad, with urban and tropical rhythms, that narrates a love story referring to two relationships; the current one and the one from the past, which continues to leave its mark today. "Cosa Guapa" (transl. "Beautiful Thing") transforms from dancehall into deep house, and includes verses in English. "Desenfocao'" (transl. "Unfocused") is a new wave, synth-pop, and funk song, with elements of disco, pop, EDM, and deep house, and finds the singer very confused after a relationship breakup, so that he barely even knows where he is. "¿Cuándo Fue?" is a downbeat heartbreak ballad, while both "La Old Skul" and "¿Y Eso?" nod to the old-school reggaeton, with the former sampling "En la Cama" by Nicky Jam and Daddy Yankee. On the trap-pop song "Tengo un Pal", Alejandro collaborated with Puerto Rican singer Lyanno, while he featured Brazilian singer Anitta on the baile funk track "Brazilera".

== Singles ==
"2/Catorce" serves as the lead single of Vice Versa. It was accompanied by a music video posted to YouTube, directed by Eric Duars and Alejandro. Both were surprise-released on February 14, 2021. It reached number one in Dominican Republic, as well as the top 15 in several other countries such as Argentina and Spain, and on Billboard's Hot Latin Songs in the United States. "Todo de Ti" was released for digital download and streaming on May 20, 2021, as the second single from the album. The song was ranked among the Best Summer Songs of All Time by Rolling Stone. It was nominated for both Record of the Year and Song of the Year at the 22nd Annual Latin Grammy Awards. The track became a massive global hit, reaching number one in Argentina, Bolivia, Chile, Colombia, Costa Rica, Dominican Republic, Ecuador, El Salvador, Guatemala, Honduras, Latin America, Mexico, Nicaragua, Panama, Paraguay, Peru, Puerto Rico, Spain, and Uruguay. The track was subsequently ranked as the best-performing song of 2021 in both Latin America and Spain. "Todo de Ti" also reached the top three on Billboard's Hot Latin Songs and Billboard Global 200 charts, becoming the third all-Spanish song in history to reach the top three on the latter.

The third single from Vice Versa, "Sexo Virtual" was released on June 25, 2021, accompanied by a Nuno Gomes directed music video, alongside the album. The song reached number one in El Salvador, Guatemala, Honduras, and Panama. It also debuted in the top 20 of Hot Latin Songs, and was certified platinum in both Mexico and Spain. "Desenfocao'" was issued to Latin American radio stations on August 10, 2021, as the first promotional single from the album. An accompanying music video, directed by Alejandro and NINE-D, was released on the same date. After going viral on TikTok and achieving commercial success, "Cúrame" was sent to radio stations on August 27, 2021, as the fourth single from the album. A music video for the song, directed by Nuno Gomes, was released on September 16, 2021. The song reached number one in Colombia and Dominican Republic, as well as the top three in Spain. It also reached the summit of the Billboard's Latin Airplay and Latin Rhythm Airplay charts in the United States.

"Nubes" was released on August 31, 2021, as the second promotional single, while its music video was directed by Fernando Lugo and released simultaneously with the song. The album's final single, "Desesperados" was launched for digital download and streaming on December 9, 2021. The song was ranked among the 100 Greatest Reggaeton Songs of All Time by Rolling Stone. It was nominated for Best Reggaeton Performance and Best Urban Song at the 23rd Annual Latin Grammy Awards. The track peaked at number one in Bolivia, Colombia, Dominican Republic, Ecuador, Honduras, Nicaragua, Peru, Spain, and Uruguay, and reached the top five in Argentina, Chile, El Salvador, Latin America, and Mexico, and on the Hot Latin Songs. It also reached the summit of the Latin Airplay and Latin Rhythm Airplay charts, and peaked at number 13 on the Billboard Global 200. An accompanying music video, released simultaneously with the song, was directed by Manson.

=== Other charted and certified songs ===
"Aquel Nap ZzZz" peaked at number 37 on the US Hot Latin Songs chart and number 64 in Spain. "Cosa Guapa" and "La Old Skul" reached numbers 53 and 45 in Spain, and were certified platinum and double platinum in the country, respectively. "La Old Skul" also peaked at number seven on Monitor Latino's Chile Urbano chart. "Brazilera" was certified gold by Pro-Música Brasil for track-equivalent sales of over 20,000 units in Brazil.

== Marketing ==
=== Release ===
Vice Versa was released for digital download and streaming by Sony Music Latin and Duars Entertainment on June 25, 2021. It featured a 17-second interlude, entitled "Track 4", consisting of electronic sounds and a robot voice repeating the word "loading". On December 9, 2021, the album was re-released with "Desesperados" replacing "Track 4" on the album.

=== Live performances ===
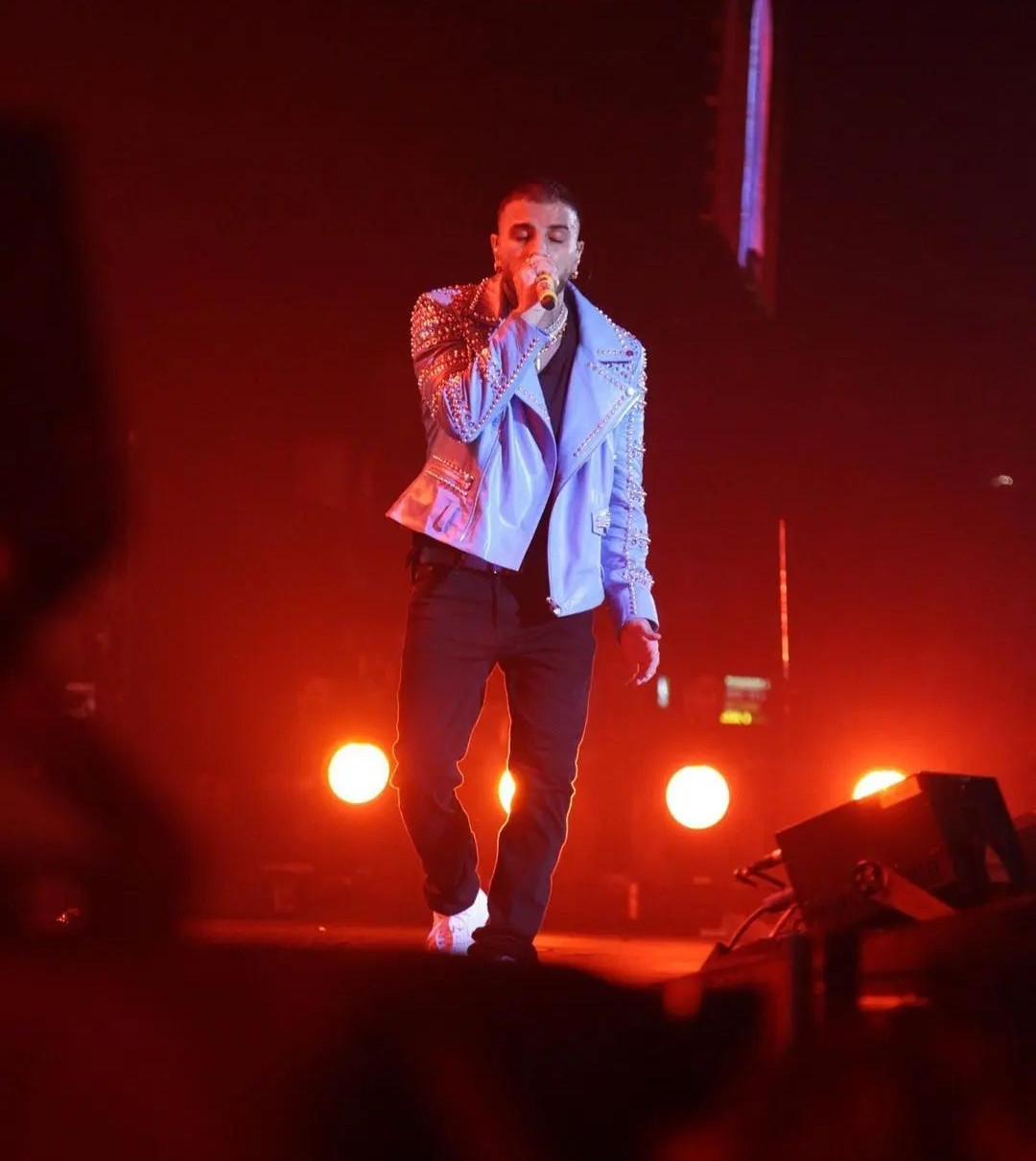
Alejandro performing "La Old Skul" on the Vice Versa Tour.

To further promote Vice Versa, he embarked on the Rauw Alejandro World Tour and the Vice Versa Tour. The former began on July 15, 2021, at the Enigma Night Club in Raleigh, North Carolina, and concluded on December 18, 2021, at the Fair Expo Center in Miami, with concerts throughout the United States, Mexico, Spain, Puerto Rico, and Dominican Republic. The Vice Versa Tour began on January 15, 2022, at the Crypto.com Arena in Los Angeles, and concluded on June 11, 2022, at the Parc del Fòrum in Barcelona, with 26 shows across the United States, Latin America, and Spain. DVILA, Joonti, and Pailita served as supporting acts on the tour. The Vice Versa Tour sold over 327,000 tickets and grossed over $24.5 million.

In addition to his tours, Alejandro performed singles from Vice Versa on several television programs and award shows. He performed "Todo de Ti" on The Kelly Clarkson Show, 2021 MTV Millennial Awards, and the 2021 Billboard Latin Music Awards. He gave a live performance of "Desenfocao'" and "Cúrame" in a special two-song set with Billboard and Honda Stage. Alejandro and Corleone performed "Desesperados" on The Tonight Show Starring Jimmy Fallon on April 6, 2022. On May 15, 2022, Alejandro performed a medley of "Cúrame", "Museo", and "Todo de Ti" at the 2022 Billboard Music Awards. On November 17, 2022, the singer gave a live performance of "Lejos del Cielo", "Más de Una Vez", "Desesperados", and "Punto 40" at the 23rd Annual Latin Grammy Awards.

== Critical reception ==
Professional ratings
Review scores
Source	Rating
Jenesaispop	3.5/5 stars
Mondo Sonoro	8/10
Pitchfork	7.2/10
Rolling Stone	4/5 stars

Vice Versa received generally favorable reviews from music critics. Rolling Stone's Lucas Villa described the album as "great" and noted Alejandro's "versatility", starting that there is "no limits" to his "malleable flow" and that he "takes reggaeton into the future" with Vice Versa. Also in his review for The Fader, Villa praised Alejandro for taking his signature "genres to new worlds altogether", proving "his ability to write captivating songs regardless of the style he chooses". He continued: "He's taking Latin pop into the future on Vice Versa; at the very least, he's set himself up as one of its biggest stars." An author of Genius admired the singer for "fearlessly" displaying his "adaptability", "craftwork", and "versatility" on the album, describing it as "a memorable rollercoaster ride": "VICE VERSA is a look into how the future of Latin music should be like; filled with hard-hitting pop beats, undeniable confidence, and addicting well-produced tracks that will undoubtedly leave their thread woven in history." Jon Caramanica from The New York Times, named Alejandro "the most imaginative meta-reggaeton Latin pop star" and adored his "synthetically sweet and appealingly lush" vocals. Also from The New York Times, Isabelia Herrera celebrated the album for "embracing melody and an unflinching (but calculated) desire to implode the traditional structures of pop and reggaeton". NPR critic Stefanie Fernández labeled it "a record that sets the standard for what a massively successful Latin pop album can, and should, accomplish".

Writing for Mondo Sonoro, Luis M. Maínez named Vice Versa "the best reggaeton album in recent years" and praised Alejandro's "particular and unmistakable style that until now no one has been able to copy". He compared the album to "the most revolutionary styles in history", saying "all tracks flow into each other with precision and organicity, with Rauw's vocals making the electric shock that unites everything". The critic highlighted "Sexo Virtual", "Cosa Guapa", "Desenfocao'", "La Old Skul", and "Aquel Nap ZzZz". Rolling Stone's Julyssa Lopez noted the singer's "thrillingly unpredictable breakthrough" and the album's "unexpected beat switches and sudden flashes of house, bolero, and Brazilian funk, morphs constantly", highlighting "Todo de Ti" as its "crowning jewel". Jason Lipshutz from Billboard stated that Vice Versa "serves as the progressive vision for Latin urban music that Alejandro wants to set forth from the A-list" and compared Alejandro with the American rapper and singer Doja Cat as he "comfortably sings and raps in equal measures, grabbing whatever instrumental arrangement is thrown his direction".

== Accolades ==
Rolling Stone hailed Vice Versa as the best Spanish-language or bilingual album of 2021 and the third-best album of the year. The Fader and The New York Times ranked it at numbers 5 and 11 on their overall albums year-end lists. Billboard placed it on an unranked list of the 20 Best Latin Albums of 2021, while naming it as the 37th-best album of the year overall. Teen Vogue and NPR listed Vice Versa among the best albums of 2021 and best Latin albums of the year, respectively, and Genius ranked it as the 23rd best album of 2021. The album has received a number of awards and nominations. It was nominated for Favorite Latin Album at the American Music Awards and Top Latin Album at the Billboard Music Awards, both in 2022.

Awards and nominations for Vice Versa
Organization	Year	Award	Result	Ref.
Master FM Awards	2021	Best Latin Album of the Year	Nominated	
Premios Lo Más Escuchado	2021	Album of the Year – International	Nominated	
American Music Awards	2022	Favorite Latin Album	Nominated	
Billboard Latin Music Awards	2022	Top Latin Album of the Year	Nominated	
Billboard Latin Music Awards	2022	Latin Rhythm Album of the Year	Nominated	
Billboard Music Awards	2022	Top Latin Album	Nominated	
Latin American Music Awards	2022	Album of the Year	Nominated	
Latin American Music Awards	2022	Favorite Album – Urban	Nominated	
Premio Lo Nuestro	2022	Urban – Album Of The Year	Nominated	
Premios Juventud	2022	Album Of The Year	Nominated	
Premios Odeón	2022	Best Latin Album	Nominated	
Premios Tu Música Urbano	2022	Album of the Year – Male Artist	Nominated	

== Commercial performance ==
Vice Versa debuted atop the US Top Latin Albums and Latin Rhythm Albums charts with first-week sales of 21,000 units, consisting of 29.1 million on-demand streams and less than 1,000 pure sales, according to data compiled by Nielsen SoundScan for the chart dated July 10, 2021. It became Alejandro's first number one album on both charts, spending two weeks at this position on each chart. The album also debuted at number 17 on the US Billboard 200, becoming the singer's second entry on the chart and his highest peak in his career, surpassing Afrodisíaco, which peaked at number 75 on November 28, 2020. By July 2022, Vice Versa had spent 54 weeks on Billboard 200, making it the sixth Spanish album in history to spend more weeks on the chart. The album was certified octuple platinum (Latin) by the Recording Industry Association of America (RIAA), for sales of over 480,000 units in the United States. In Spain, the album debuted at number one on July 4, 2021, and spent eight non-consecutive weeks atop the chart. It was later certified double platinum by the Productores de Música de España (PROMUSICAE), for selling over 80,000 units in the country. The album was also certified 3× platinum by the Asociación Mexicana de Productores de Fonogramas y Videogramas (AMPROFON), for sales of over 420,000 units in Mexico.

== Track listing ==
Track listing adapted from Tidal.

Vice Versa track listing
No.	Title	Writer(s)	Producer(s)	Length
1.	"Todo de Ti"	Eric "Duars" Pérez Rovira; José M. Collazo "Colla"; Luis J. González "Mr. NaisGai"; Rafael E. Pabón Navedo "Rafa Pabón"; Raúl Alejandro Ocasio Ruiz "Rauw Alejandro"	Raúl Ocasio "El Zorro"; Mr. Naisgai	3:19
2.	"Sexo Virtual"	Marcos Masís "Tainy"; Emmanuel Sosa; Alberto Carlos Melendez; Jorge E. Pizarro "Kenobi"; Colla; Duars; Alejandro; Jorge Álvaro Díaz "Álvarito"	Albert Hype; Tainy	3:28
3.	"Nubes"	Alejandro	Caleb Calloway	2:58
4.	"Desesperados" (with Chencho Corleone)	Alejandro; Orlando Javier del Valle; Jorge Cedeño Echevarria; Nino Karlo Segarra; Mr. NaisGai; Colla; Kenobi; Duars	El Zorro; Dulce como Candy; Dímelo Ninow; Mr. Naisgai	3:44
5.	"2/Catorce" (with Mr. Naisgai)	Alejandro	Mr. Naisgai	3:25
6.	"Aquel Nap ZzZz"	Alejandro	Orteez; El Zorro; Álvarito; Mr. Naisgai	4:55
7.	"Cúrame"	Alejandro	Kenobi; Charlie Handsome	2:44
8.	"Cosa Guapa"	Alejandro; Edgardo R. Cuevas "Lyanno"; Adrián Sánchez "Eydren con el Ritmo"; Mr. Naisgai; Héctor C. López; Colla; Kenobi; Duars	Eydren con el Ritmo; Kenobi; El Zorro; Calloway; Mr. Naisgai	4:15
9.	"Desenfocao'"	Manuel Lara; Pabón; Kenobi; Colla; Duars; Alejandro; Tainy	Manu Lara; Tainy	2:50
10.	"¿Cuándo Fue?" (with Tainy)	Kenobi; Tainy; Colla; Duars; Alejandro; Abner Cordero Boria "Jota Rosa"	Tainy	2:48
11.	"La Old Skul"	Alejandro	El Zorro; Calloway	3:34
12.	"¿Y Eso?"	Tainy; Pabón; Kenobi; Colla; Duars; Álvarito; Alejandro; Jesús Manuel Nieves Cortez "Jhay Cortez"	Tainy	3:20
13.	"Tengo un Pal" (with Lyanno and Caleb Calloway)	Duars; Colla; Alejandro; José Cruz "Phantom"	Calloway; Phantom	3:15
14.	"Brazilera" (with Anitta)	Pabón; Larissa de Macedo Machado; Calloway; Kenobi; Colla; Duars; Álvarito; Alejandro	El Zorro; Calloway	3:04
Total length:				47:39

== Personnel ==
Credits adapted from Tidal.

Musicians

- Rauw Alejandro – vocals (all tracks)
- Carlos Orlando Navarro – guitar (tracks 1, 6), performance arranging (track 1)
- Chencho Corleone – vocals (track 4)
- Kenobi – backing vocals (track 7)
- Charlie Handsome – guitar (tracks 7–8)
- Lyanno – vocals (track 13)
- Anitta – vocals (track 14)

Technical

- El Zorro – production (tracks 1, 4, 6, 8, 11, 14)
- Colla – mix engineering (all tracks), record engineering (track 1), master engineering (tracks 2–3, 5–14)
- Eric Duars – executive production (track 1)
- Sensei Sound – master engineering (tracks 1, 4)
- Kenobi – record engineering (tracks 2–6, 8–14), production (tracks 7–8)
- Tainy – production (tracks 2, 9–10, 12)
- Albert Hype – production (track 2)
- Caleb Calloway – production (tracks 3, 8, 11, 13–14)
- Mr. NaisGai – production (tracks 4–6, 8)
- Dulce como Candy – production (track 4)
- Dímelo Ninow – production (track 4)
- Orteez – production (track 6)
- Álvarito – production (track 6)
- Charlie Handsome – production (track 7), record engineering (track 7)
- Eydren – production (track 8)
- Manu Lara – production (track 9)
- Phantom – production (track 13)

== Charts ==
=== Weekly charts ===
Weekly chart performance for Vice Versa
Chart (2021–2024)	Peak position
Italian Albums (FIMI)	59
Portuguese Albums (AFP)	71
Spanish Albums (Promusicae)	1
US Billboard 200	17
US Latin Rhythm Albums (Billboard)	1
US Top Latin Albums (Billboard)	1

=== Year-end charts ===
2021 year-end chart performance for Vice Versa
Chart (2021)	Position
Spanish Albums (PROMUSICAE)	5
US Billboard 200	189
US Latin Rhythm Albums (Billboard)	9
US Top Latin Albums (Billboard)	11

2022 year-end chart performance for Vice Versa
Chart (2022)	Position
Spanish Albums (PROMUSICAE)	5
US Billboard 200	161
US Latin Rhythm Albums (Billboard)	4
US Top Latin Albums (Billboard)	4

2023 year-end chart performance for Vice Versa
Chart (2023)	Position
Spanish Albums (PROMUSICAE)	21

== Certifications ==
Certifications and sales for Vice Versa
Region	Certification	Certified units/sales
Italy (FIMI)	Platinum	50,000^{‡}
Mexico (AMPROFON)	Diamond+Gold	770,000^{‡}
Spain (Promusicae)	2× Platinum	80,000^{‡}
United States (RIAA)	17× Platinum (Latin)	1,020,000^{‡}
Streaming
Central America (CFC)	Platinum	7,000,000^{†}
^{‡} Sales+streaming figures based on certification alone.^{†} Streaming-only figures based on certification alone.

== Release history ==
Release dates and formats for Vice Versa
Region	Date	Format(s)	Label	Ref.
Various	June 25, 2021	Digital download; streaming	Sony Music Latin; Duars Entertainment	

== See also ==
- 2021 in Latin music
- List of number-one Billboard Latin Albums from the 2020s
- List of number-one Billboard Latin Rhythm Albums of 2021
