= Rauw Alejandro World Tour =

2021 concert tour by Rauw Alejandro

- Tour by Rauw Alejandro
- Location: North America; Europe
- Associated albums: Afrodisíaco; Vice Versa
- Start date: July 15, 2021
- End date: December 18, 2021
- Legs: 3
- No. of shows: 52

Rauw Alejandro concert chronology
- Fantasias Tour (2020); Rauw Alejandro World Tour (2021); Vice Versa Tour (2022)

The Rauw Alejandro World Tour was the second concert tour by Puerto Rican singer Rauw Alejandro, in support of his first two studio albums, Afrodisíaco (2020) and Vice Versa (2021). It began on July 15, 2021 in Raleigh and concluded on December 18 of that year in Miami, with several shows throughout United States, Mexico, Spain, Puerto Rico, and Dominican Republic. Puerto Rican singer Eix served as a supporting act on the tour. The tour was met with highly positive reviews from critics, who complimented Alejandro's dance moves and choreography. His four sold-out shows at the José Miguel Agrelot Coliseum in San Juan had grossed over $3,086,525 from an audience of 51,692.

== Background ==
On June 10, 2021, Rauw Alejandro formally announced the Rauw Alejandro World Tour, with 37 shows across the United States, Mexico, and Spain from July 15, 2021, to January 15, 2022. Tickets went on sale the following day through his website. The tour was presented by Duars Entertainment, with the support of Kirk Taboada and Zamora Entertainment, to promote the singer's first two studio albums, Afrodisíaco (2020) and Vice Versa (2021).

On June 21, 2021, he announced that he would also perform at the José Miguel Agrelot Coliseum in San Juan, Puerto Rico, for his tour: "I am very happy with this news. I have my first concert where I always dreamed of singing and where life saw me grow, I love you." Alejandro later announced new American dates in multiple cities such as San Antonio, El Paso, and Reading. Puerto Rican singer Eix served as the opening act of the first leg in the United States. In October 2021, Alejandro announced two new dates in La Romana, Dominican Republic for November 2021, in which his team was criticized for the show's "very high" ticket prices.

== Critical reception ==
The Rauw Alejandro World Tour was met with highly positive reviews from critics. Writing for Milwaukee Journal Sentinel, Piet Levy praised "all of Alejandro's standout talents", mentioning the "ingenuity of his music", "his sharp dance moves", and "his magnetic presence" in his performances, and stated that he proves he is "reggaeton's next superstar" on the tour. Jhoni Jackson from Rolling Stone described his show at the José Miguel Agrelot Coliseum as "celebratory", called the dancers' choreography "absolutely artful", and named Alejandro's rendition theatrical. She also praised the singer's "unstoppable" energy and enthusiasm, as well as his contagious "persistent elation". In her review of the same show for Primera Hora, Rosa Escribano Carrasquillo highlighted Alejandro's charisma, dance moves, flirtations with his fans, as well as the invited artists and the "colorful" images projected on the screens of the stage, and said he "managed to show security and mastery of the stage" during the concert". RTVE critic Miriam Martin gave his Barcelona's show a positive review, describing it as "great". She thought it "will remain forever etched in the memory of the fans" who attended the concert, complimented Alejandro's "mythical dances and choreographies" and his setlist for including "great songs after great songs".

== Set list ==
This set list is representative of the show on October 21, 2021 in San Juan. It is not representative of all concerts for the duration of the tour.

1. "Dile a Él"
2. "Strawberry Kiwi"
3. "Mood"
4. "Que Le Dé"
5. "Enchule"
6. "Mírame"
7. "Una Noche"
8. "Tattoo"
9. "Nostálgico"
10. "Loquita"
11. "La Curiosidad"
12. "Elegí"
13. "Mi Llamada"
14. "Toda"
15. "Pensándote"
16. "Extrañándote"
17. "Nubes"
18. "Aquel Nap ZzZz"
19. "Brazilera"
20. "Química"
21. "Ponte Pa' Mí"
22. "Algo Mágico"
23. "Fantasías"
24. "Dembow 2020"
25. "Soy Una Gárgola"
26. "La Old Skul"
27. "Perreo Pesau'"
28. "El Efecto"
29. "Dream Girl (remix)"
30. "2/Catorce"
31. "Sexo Virtual"
32. "La Nota"
33. "Cúrame"
34. "Todo de Ti"

=== Special guests ===
Alejandro surprised fans throughout the tour with special guests, performing his collaborations with them.

- October 9, 2021 – Barcelona: Lyanno
- October 21, 2021 – San Juan: Lyanno, Reik, Farruko, and Chencho Corleone
- October, 2021 - Zaragoza: Bad Gyal

== Shows ==
List of North American concerts
Date (2021)	City	Country	Venue	Opening acts	Attendance	Revenue
July 15	Raleigh	United States	Enigma Night Club	Eix		
July 16	Charlotte	United States	Ovens Auditorium	Eix		
July 17	Providence	United States	The Strand	Eix		
July 18	Elizabeth	United States	Ritz Theatre	Eix		
July 22	Minneapolis	United States	Aldrich Arena	Eix		
July 23	Kansas City	United States	Bermudas Event Center	Eix		
July 24	Omaha	United States	Ralston Arena	Eix		
July 25	Milwaukee	United States	The Rave/Eagles Club	Eix		
July 29	Miami	United States	LIV Nightclub	Eix		
July 30	Fort Myers	United States	Hertz Arena	Eix		
July 31 (Note: The concerts of July 31 and December 18, 2021, are part of Vibra Urbana festival.)	Orlando	United States	Orlando Amphitheater	Eix		
August 5 (Note: The concerts of August 5 and 7, 2021, are part of Uforia Latino Mix Live! festival.)	Dallas	United States	Dos Equis Pavilion	Eix		
August 7	Houston	United States	BBVA Stadium	Eix		
August 8	Odessa	United States	La Hacienda Event Center	Eix		
August 12	San Antonio	United States	Cowboys Dancehall	Eix		
August 13	Austin	United States	The Coliseum	Eix		
August 14	McAllen	United States	Payne Arena	Eix		
August 15 (Note: The concerts of August 15 and 22, 2021, are part of Baja Beach festival.)	Rosarito	Mexico	Papas & Beer	—N/a		
August 20	Denver	United States	Eclipse Event Center	—N/a		
August 21	Salt Lake	United States	801 Event Center	—N/a		
August 22	Rosarito	Mexico	Papas & Beer	—N/a		
August 27	Fresno	United States	Rainbow Ballroom	—N/a		
August 28	Oakland	United States	Paramount Theatre	—N/a		
August 29	Ontario	United States	Toyota Arena	—N/a		
September 2	Phoenix	United States	Celebrity Theatre	—N/a		
September 3 (Note: The concert of September 3, 2021, is part of J Balvin: NEON festival.)	Las Vegas	United States	AYU Dayclub	—N/a		
September 4 (Note: The concert of September 4, 2021, is part of El Puro Party festival.)	Mountain View	United States	Shoreline Amphitheatre	—N/a		
September 5	El Paso	United States	El Paso County Coliseum	—N/a		
September 9	Columbus	United States	La Boom Columbus	—N/a		
September 10	Detroit	United States	Masonic Theatre	—N/a		
September 11	Reading	United States	Santander Arena	—N/a		
September 16	Ledyard	United States	Premier Theater	—N/a		
September 17	Fairfax	United States	EagleBank Arena	—N/a		

List of European concerts
Date (2021)	City	Country	Venue	Opening acts	Attendance	Revenue
September 30	Madrid	Spain	Palacio Vistalegre	—N/a		
October 2	Málaga	Spain	Auditorio Cortijo de Torres	—N/a		
October 3	Granada	Spain	Centro Comercial Nevada	—N/a		
October 8	Murcia	Spain	Plaza de Toros la Condomina	—N/a		
October 9	Barcelona	Spain	Palau Sant Jordi	—N/a		
October 10	Valencia	Spain	Auditorio Marina Sur	—N/a		
October 11	Bilbao	Spain	Bilbao Exhibition Centre	—N/a		
October 12	Palma de Mallorca	Spain	Visit Mallorca Stadium	—N/a		
October 13	Zaragoza	Spain	Pabellón Príncipe Felipe	—N/a		
October 15 (Note: The concert of October 15, 2021, is part of Boombastic festival.)	A Coruña	Spain	Coliseum da Coruña	—N/a		
October 16	Gran Canaria	Spain	Estadio de Maspalomas	—N/a		

List of North American concerts
Date (2021)	City	Country	Venue	Opening acts	Attendance	Revenue
October 21	San Juan	Puerto Rico	José Miguel Agrelot Coliseum	—N/a	51,692 / 51,692	$3,086,525
October 22	San Juan	Puerto Rico	José Miguel Agrelot Coliseum	—N/a	51,692 / 51,692	$3,086,525
October 23	San Juan	Puerto Rico	José Miguel Agrelot Coliseum	—N/a	51,692 / 51,692	$3,086,525
October 24	San Juan	Puerto Rico	José Miguel Agrelot Coliseum	—N/a	51,692 / 51,692	$3,086,525
November 5	La Romana	Dominican Republic	Altos de Chavon	—N/a		
November 6	La Romana	Dominican Republic	Altos de Chavon	—N/a		
December 4 (Note: The concert of December 4, 2021, is part of Mega Bash festival.)	Newark	United States	Prudential Center	—N/a		
December 18	Miami	United States	Fair Expo Center	—N/a		
