= Nubes (song) =

2021 song by Rauw Alejandro

Promotional single by Rauw Alejandro

from the album Vice Versa
- Language: Spanish
- English title: "Clouds"
- Released: August 31, 2021
- Genre: Pop; reggaeton
- Length: 2:58
- Label: Sony Latin; Duars
- Songwriter: Raúl A. Ocasio Ruiz "Rauw Alejandro"
- Producer: Caleb Calloway

Rauw Alejandro promotional singles chronology
| "Desenfocao'" (2021) | "Nubes" (2021) | "Hunter" (2021) |

Music video
- "Nubes" on YouTube

"Nubes" (transl. "Clouds") is a song recorded by Puerto Rican singer Rauw Alejandro for his second studio album, Vice Versa (2021). The song was written by Alejandro, while the production was handled by Caleb Calloway. It was released by Sony Music Latin and Duars Entertainment on August 31, 2021, as the second promotional single from the album. A Spanish language reggaeton and pop song, with elements of electronic music, it declares the singer's eternal love to the girl who has won his heart.

"Nubes" received generally positive reviews from music critics, who complimented its sweetness and described it as "dreamy", however a critic thought it skewed "generic" and "boring". The song charted in Spain as an album track, before its release as a promotional single. An accompanying music video, released simultaneously with the song, was directed by Fernando Lugo. It depicts Alejandro going on a tropical trip through Puerto Rico. The track was featured in GTA Online: The Contract (2021).

== Background and composition ==
"Nubes"
A 17-second sample of the chorus

Alejandro released his debut studio album, Afrodisíaco, on November 13, 2020. Two weeks after finishing the work on Afrodisíaco, he started working on his second studio album, Vice Versa. The latter was released for digital download and streaming by Sony Music Latin and Duars Entertainment on June 25, 2021, and "Nubes" was included as the third track.

Musically, "Nubes" is a Spanish language reggaeton and pop song, with elements of electronic music. Written by Alejandro and produced by Caleb Calloway, the track runs for a total of 2 minutes and 58 seconds. Lyrically, "Nubes" which translates to "Clouds" in English, declares the singer's eternal love to the girl who has won his heart. The lyrics include, "Tú me subes a las nubes / No me dejes caer de este cielo / Me gustas tanto que tengo miedo a enamorarme de nuevo" (You raise me to the clouds / Don't let me fall from this sky / I like you so much that I'm afraid to fall in love again).

== Promotion and reception ==
A screenshot from the music video, depicting Alejandro riding in the bed of a truck.

On August 31, 2021, "Nubes" was released as the second promotional single from Vice Versa, with a music video directed by Fernando Lugo. The visual depicts Alejandro going on a tropical trip through his native, Puerto Rico, "with scenes that will leave [the audience] wanting to savor a piña colada by the sea". Los 40's Laura Coca said that like it is suggested by its title, the video "takes us up to the clouds". She continued praising the visual that "perfectly represents" what the singer wants to "express through his verses". The song was included on the set lists for Alejandro's the Rauw Alejandro World Tour and the Vice Versa Tour. The track was featured in the online multiplayer action-adventure game GTA Online: The Contract (2021).

"Nubes" was met with generally positive reviews from music critics. In her review for The New York Times, Isabelia Herrera compared the song's sweetness to saccharin, stating that it is "engineered to be a radio hit". PapelPop's Guilherme Araujo said that it "evokes sunny days along the shores of Puerto Rico", while Lucas Villa of Rolling Stone described the song as "dreamy". Matthew Ismael Ruiz from Pitchfork called it "the lovers daydream", however he criticized it for skewing "generic" and "boring". Following the release of Vice Versa, "Nubes" debuted and peaked at number 81 on Spain's official weekly chart on July 4, 2021, as an album track. It was later certified gold by the Productores de Música de España (PROMUSICAE), for track-equivalent sales of over 30,000 units in the country.

== Credits and personnel ==
Credits adapted from Tidal.

- Rauw Alejandro – associated performer, composer, lyricist
- Caleb Calloway – producer
- José M. Collazo "Colla" – mastering engineer, mixing engineer
- Jorge E. Pizarro "Kenobi" – recording engineer

== Charts ==
Weekly peak performance for "Nubes"
| Chart (2021) | Peak position |
|---|---|
| Spain (Promusicae) | 81 |

== Certifications ==
Certifications and sales for "Nubes"
| Region | Certification | Certified units/sales |
|---|---|---|
| Mexico (AMPROFON) | Gold | 70,000^{‡} |
| Spain (Promusicae) | Gold | 30,000^{‡} |
^{‡} Sales+streaming figures based on certification alone.
