= Desesperados =

2021 single by Rauw Alejandro and Chencho Corleone

Single by Rauw Alejandro and Chencho Corleone

from the album Vice Versa
- Language: Spanish
- English title: "Desperate"
- Released: December 9, 2021
- Genre: Reggaeton
- Length: 3:44
- Label: Sony Latin; Duars
- Songwriters: Raúl Alejandro Ocasio Ruiz "Rauw Alejandro"; Orlando Javier del Valle; Jorge Cedeño Echevarria; Nino Karlo Segarra; Luis Jonuel González "NaisGai"; José M. Collazo; Jorge E. Pizarro Ruiz; Eric Pérez Rovira "Eric Duars"
- Producers: El Zorro "Rauw Alejandro"; Dulce como Candy; Dimelo Ninow; NaisGai

Rauw Alejandro singles chronology
"Sabe" (2021)	"Desesperados" (2021)	"Caprichoso" (2022)

Chencho Corleone singles chronology
"Guilla de Crema" (2021)	"Desesperados" (2021)	"La Llevo al Cielo" (2022)

Music video
- "Desesperados" on YouTube

"Desesperados" (transl. "Desperate") is a song recorded by Puerto Rican singers Rauw Alejandro and Chencho Corleone for Alejandro's second studio album, Vice Versa (2021). It was written by Alejandro, Corleone, Jorge Cedeño Echevarria, Nino Segarra, NaisGai, Colla, Kenobi, and Eric Duars, while the production was handled by Alejandro, Dulce como Candy, Dimelo Ninow, and NaisGai. The song was released for digital download and streaming by Sony Music Latin and Duars Entertainment on December 9, 2021, as the fifth single from the album. A Spanish language reggaeton song with elements of cumbia and dembow, it is about two people who are apart, but still have love for each other, so they somehow try to get back together. The track received widely positive reviews from music critics, who complimented its danceable and catchy rhythm and the singers' vocals.

"Desesperados" was ranked among the 100 Greatest Reggaeton Songs of All Time by Rolling Stone. It was nominated for Best Reggaeton Performance and Best Urban Song at the 23rd Annual Latin Grammy Awards. The song was commercially successful, reaching number one in nine countries, including Colombia and Spain, as well as the top five in several other countries such as Argentina and Mexico, and on Billboard's Hot Latin Songs in the United States. It also reached the summit of the Latin Airplay and Latin Rhythm Airplay charts, peaked at number 13 on the Billboard Global 200, and became Corleone's first entry on the Billboard Hot 100. The song has received several certifications, including Latin quadruple platinum in the United States. An accompanying music video, released simultaneously with the song, was directed by Manson and contains erotic scenes. To promote the song, Alejandro and Corleone performed it on The Tonight Show Starring Jimmy Fallon.

== Background and release ==
Rauw Alejandro released his second studio album, Vice Versa on June 25, 2021. The album debuted at number one on Billboard Top Latin Albums, giving Alejandro his first number one on the chart, and was ranked as the third-best album of 2021 and the best Spanish-language album of the year by Rolling Stone. It featured a 17-second interlude, entitled "Track 4", consisting of electronic sounds and a robot voice repeating the word "loading". The following month, during an interview with Los 40, he explained about it: "Track 4 is a surprise. People still don't understand why I did that. It is a song that has no song. It's a surprise I have for you, but it's a song that's going to come out soon." The "hype" made by the interlude was noted by the media as "a good marketing technique". On November 17, 2021, Alejandro announced that he had set a release date for the track via Instagram.

On December 9, 2021, "Desesperados" was released for digital download and streaming by Sony Music Latin and Duars Entertainment as the fifth single from Vice Versa and replaced "Track 4" on the album. It marked the second collaboration between Alejandro and Chencho Corleone, who had previously worked on "El Efecto" in 2019. In May 2022, during an interview with Billboard, Alejandro called Corleone a "legend" and spoke about the collaboration: "[...] I did my first collab with Chencho, it was in 'El Efecto'. It was like three years ago and it did really well. We have good chemistry, so people was like waiting for the next collab and I waited for my album to put 'Desesperados' [in it], and you know, we got two of two right now."

== Music and lyrics ==
"Desesperados"
A 22-second sample of the chorus, which features an upbeat reggaeton melody.

Musically, "Desesperados" is a Spanish language upbeat reggaeton song, with elements of cumbia and dembow. The song was written by Alejandro, Corleone, Jorge Cedeño Echevarria, Nino Segarra, NaisGai, Colla, Kenobi, and Eric Duars. Its production was handled by Alejandro, Dulce como Candy, Dimelo Ninow, and NaisGai, and the track runs for a total of 3 minutes and 44 seconds. Lyrically, "Desesperados" which translates to "Desperate" in English, is about two people who are apart, but still have love for each other, so they somehow try to get back together. There is a very passionate affair between the two lovers who cannot even "be bothered to park their car before ripping their clothes off", while they have already reserved a hotel room. The lyrics include, "La primera vez que perriamos / No pudimos evitarlo y nos besamos / Que el momento no acabara" (The first time we danced / We couldn't help it and we kissed / That the moment wouldn't end).

== Critical reception ==
Upon release, "Desesperados" was met with widely positive reviews from music critics. In his review for Billboard, Jason Lipshutz described the track as "shiny", saying it "draws out both of their respective strengths while adhering to the contours of the full-length it's joining". He continued praising Alejandro's "vocal showcase" and Corleone's "especially animated" sound. Rolling Stone critic Lucas Villa described Alejandro's vocals as "smooth" and commented that the track successfully embodys both the reggaeton's "past and present". Los 40's Carolina Rodriguez Conza noted that its "series of reggaeton sounds and catchy rhythms" make the listeners "dance non-stop". In another article, she described it as "a single with pure sounds of the urban genre that left us speechless and wanting to hear more from Puerto Rico". Nadia Juanes from El Rescate Musical applauded the song for being "perfect for dancing at any party", while Raphael Helfand of The Fader described its rhythm as "infectious". An author of Monitor Latino gave "Desesperados" a positive review, labeling it "[a] great single" that "shines twice as much thanks to the collaboration" of Corleone on Alejandro's song. ¡Hola! critic Rebecah Jacobs introduced Alejandro as "breakout Latin music sensation" and Ocio Latino staff named him a "phenomenon" in their respective reviews of the song. In 2022, Ernesto Lechner from Rolling Stone ranked the track as the singer's third-best song.

== Accolades ==
In 2022, Rolling Stone ranked "Desesperados" as the 90th Greatest Reggaeton Song of All Time. The track has received a number of awards and nominations. It was nominated for Best Reggaeton Performance and Best Urban Song at the 23rd Annual Latin Grammy Awards.

Awards and nominations for "Desesperados"
Organization	Year	Award	Result	Ref.
Latin Grammy Awards	2022	Best Reggaeton Performance	Nominated	
Latin Grammy Awards	2022	Best Urban Song	Nominated	
Latino Show Awards	2022	Best Urban Song	Nominated	
Latino Show Awards	2022	Best Urban Music Video	Nominated	
Latino Show Awards	2022	Best Urban Music Producer	Nominated	
Premios Tu Música Urbano	2022	Collaboration of the Year	Nominated	
ASCAP Latin Awards	2023	Winning Song	Won	
Latin American Music Awards	2023	Best Song – Urban	Nominated	
Premio Lo Nuestro	2023	Urban Song of the Year	Nominated	

== Commercial performance ==
"Desesperados" became a global hit, peaking at numbers 13 and 10 on the Billboard Global 200 and Billboard Global Excl. US charts, respectively. The song debuted at number 27 on the US Billboard Hot Latin Songs chart on December 25, 2021, becoming Alejandro's 26th entry. On April 2, 2022, the track reached its peak of number five, giving Alejandro his sixth top-10 hit on the chart. It also peaked at number one on both the Latin Airplay and Latin Rhythm Airplay charts on July 2, 2022. Thus it became Alejandro's ninth crowning hit on both, as well as Corleone's first ever number one hit as a lead artist on a Billboard radio chart. "Desesperados" debuted at number 99 on the US Billboard Hot 100 on the chart issue dated June 16, 2022, becoming Alejandro's third entry on the chart and Corleone's first. The following week, it climbed to number 98, and subsequently peaked at number 91 in its third week on the Hot 100. The song was certified quadruple platinum (Latin) by the Recording Industry Association of America (RIAA), for track-equivalent sales of over 240,000 units in the United States.

Besides the United States, "Desesperados" hit the charts in several European countries, including Portugal and Switzerland, and was certified gold by the Federazione Industria Musicale Italiana (FIMI), for track-equivalent sales of over 50,000 units in Italy. In Spain's official weekly chart, the song debuted at number seven on December 19, 2021. It subsequently peaked at number one on the chart for three consecutive weeks, becoming Alejandro's third number one hit in the country and Corleone's first. The track was later certified sextuple platinum by the Productores de Música de España (PROMUSICAE), for track-equivalent sales of over 360,000 units in the country. In Latin America, "Desesperados" experienced a huge commercial success. It peaked at number one in Bolivia, Colombia, Dominican Republic, Ecuador, Honduras, Nicaragua, Peru, and Uruguay, and reached the top 10 in Argentina, Chile, Costa Rica, El Salvador, Guatemala, Latin America, Mexico, Panama, and Paraguay. In Mexico, the song was certified diamond by the Asociación Mexicana de Productores de Fonogramas y Videogramas (AMPROFON), for track-equivalent sales of over 700,000 units. It was also certified gold by Pro-Música Brasil for track-equivalent sales of over 20,000 units in Brazil.

== Promotion ==
=== Music video ===
A screenshot from the music video, depicting Alejandro singing in a flower field.

An accompanying music video was released simultaneously with the song. The visual was directed by the directing team Manson. It depicts Alejandro and Corleone singing in nightclubs and "polychrome flower fields". It also contains several provocative and erotic scenes, featuring women, black-and-white empty bedrooms, and luxurious cars. Cynthia Valdez from ¡Hola! described the video as "colorful". It was nominated for Best Urban Music Video at the 2022 Latino Show Awards.

=== Live performances ===
Alejandro and Corleone performed the song on The Tonight Show Starring Jimmy Fallon on April 6, 2022. On November 17, 2022, Alejandro gave a live performance of "Lejos del Cielo", "Más de Una Vez", "Desesperados", and "Punto 40" at the 23rd Annual Latin Grammy Awards. "Desesperados" was also included on the set list for his the Vice Versa Tour.

== Track listing ==
Digital download / streaming
No.	Title	Length
1.	"Desesperados"	3:44

== Credits and personnel ==
Credits adapted from Tidal.

- Rauw Alejandro – associated performer, composer, lyricist, producer
- Chencho Corleone – associated performer, composer, lyricist
- Jorge Cedeño Echevarria – composer, lyricist
- Nino Karlo Segarra – composer, lyricist
- NaisGai – composer, lyricist, producer
- José M. Collazo – composer, lyricist, mixing engineer
- Jorge E. Pizarro "Kenobi" – composer, lyricist, recording engineer
- Eric Pérez Rovira "Eric Duars" – composer, lyricist
- Dulce como Candy – producer
- Dimelo Ninow – producer
- Tayla Rene Feldman – A&R coordinator
- John Eddie Pérez – A&R director
- Sensei Sound – mastering engineer

== Charts ==
=== Weekly charts ===
Weekly peak performance for "Desesperados"
Chart (2021–2023)	Peak position
Argentina Hot 100 (Billboard)	4
Bolivia Songs (Billboard) (Note: The Hits of the World charts were launched in February 2022. Therefore, "Desesperados" did not have a full run on the chart.)	1
Chile (Monitor Latino)	18
Chile Songs (Billboard)	2
Colombia (Monitor Latino)	1
Colombia (National-Report)	1
Colombia Songs (Billboard)	4
Costa Rica (Monitor Latino)	6
Dominican Republic (Monitor Latino)	1
Ecuador (Monitor Latino)	5
Ecuador Songs (Billboard)	1
El Salvador (Monitor Latino)	5
Global 200 (Billboard)	13
Guatemala (Monitor Latino)	7
Honduras (Monitor Latino)	1
Latin America (Monitor Latino)	3
Mexico Airplay (Billboard)	19
Mexico Songs (Billboard)	3
Nicaragua (Monitor Latino)	1
Panama (Monitor Latino)	6
Paraguay (Monitor Latino)	13
Peru (Monitor Latino)	1
Peru Songs (Billboard)	1
Puerto Rico Urbano (Monitor Latino)	15
Portugal (AFP)	81
Spain (Promusicae)	1
Switzerland (Schweizer Hitparade)	97
US Billboard Hot 100	91
US Hot Latin Songs (Billboard)	5
US Latin Airplay (Billboard)	1
US Latin Rhythm Airplay (Billboard)	1
Venezuela Urbano (Monitor Latino)	9

=== Monthly charts ===
Monthly chart position for "Desesperados"
Chart (2022)	Peak position
Paraguay (SGP)	8
Uruguay (CUDISCO)	1

=== Year-end charts ===
2022 year-end chart performance for "Desesperados"
Chart (2022)	Position
Argentina (Monitor Latino)	64
Bolivia (Monitor Latino)	17
Chile (Monitor Latino)	28
Colombia (Monitor Latino)	2
Costa Rica (Monitor Latino)	12
Dominican Republic (Monitor Latino)	3
Ecuador (Monitor Latino)	13
El Salvador (Monitor Latino)	6
Global 200 (Billboard)	41
Guatemala (Monitor Latino)	5
Honduras (Monitor Latino)	4
Latin America (Monitor Latino)	5
Nicaragua (Monitor Latino)	3
Panama (Monitor Latino)	16
Paraguay (Monitor Latino)	28
Peru (Monitor Latino)	3
Puerto Rico (Monitor Latino)	81
Spain (PROMUSICAE)	7
Uruguay (CUDISCO)	4
Uruguay Latino (Monitor Latino)	100
US Hot Latin Songs (Billboard)	18
US Latin Airplay (Billboard)	9
US Latin Rhythm Airplay (Billboard)	5
Venezuela (Monitor Latino)	64

2023 year-end chart performance for "Desesperados"
Chart (2023)	Position
Central America (Monitor Latino)	82
Costa Rica Urbano (Monitor Latino)	39
Dominican Republic Urbano (Monitor Latino)	88
Ecuador (Monitor Latino)	96
El Salvador Pop (Monitor Latino)	92
Guatemala (Monitor Latino)	88
Honduras (Monitor Latino)	86
Nicaragua (Monitor Latino)	58
Panama Urbano (Monitor Latino)	56
Peru (Monitor Latino)	77
Venezuela Urbano (Monitor Latino)	94

== Certifications ==
Certifications and sales for "Desesperados"
Region	Certification	Certified units/sales
Brazil (Pro-Música Brasil)	Platinum	40,000^{‡}
Canada (Music Canada)	Gold	40,000^{‡}
Italy (FIMI)	Gold	50,000^{‡}
Mexico (AMPROFON)	2× Diamond+Platinum	1,540,000^{‡}
Portugal (AFP)	Gold	5,000^{‡}
Spain (Promusicae)	7× Platinum	420,000^{‡}
United States (RIAA)	4× Platinum (Latin)	240,000^{‡}
Streaming
Central America (CFC)	Platinum	7,000,000^{†}
^{‡} Sales+streaming figures based on certification alone.^{†} Streaming-only figures based on certification alone.

== Release history ==
Release dates and formats for "Desesperados"
Region	Date	Format(s)	Label	Ref.
Various	December 9, 2021	Digital download; streaming	Sony Music Latin; Duars Entertainment	
Latin America	January 3, 2022	Contemporary hit radio	Sony Music Latin; Duars Entertainment	
Italy	January 28, 2022	Contemporary hit radio	Sony Music Latin; Duars Entertainment	

== See also ==
- 2022 in Latin music
- List of best-selling singles in Spain
- List of Billboard Argentina Hot 100 top-ten singles in 2022
- List of Billboard Hot Latin Songs and Latin Airplay number ones of 2022
- List of Latin songs on the Billboard Hot 100
- List of number-one singles of 2022 (Spain)
