= Mach and Daddy =

Panamanian music duo

- Origin: Panama
- Genres: Reggaeton, reggae en Español
- Years active: 2004–2012
- Labels: Panama Music * Machete Music
- Members: Mista Mach; Martin Machore

Mach and Daddy were a Panamanian reggaeton duo consisting of Pedro "Mach" Machore and Martin "Daddy" Machore.

The first single for which they were recognized, "La Botella" ("The Bottle"), charted throughout Latin America and hit #1 on the Billboard chart. Other popular singles included "La Juma" and "El Que Se Fue Pa Barranquilla".

The duo's concerts attracted as many as fifty thousand people. They toured and performed throughout Latin America and the United States.

Peter Machore is "Mach" and Martin Machore is "Daddy". They derived their musical muse from their father, singer and composer Armando Machore, who was a member of the group Calipso Panama.

== History ==
The duo formed in 2000, when they released "The Essence of Your Love." Their theme song "La Botella" was released in February 2005, and became a musical phenomenon on Panamanian radio. "La Botella"'s run to #1 dethroned Shakira and Maná. Mach and Daddy toured the U.S beginning in January 2006. "Conducting From Below" was produced by Universal Music Latino.

"Thank God" was released in 2008.

== Killa Records ==
The duo joined friend and fellow Panamaian singer Jr. Ranks to create Killa Records, where they worked to recruit and produce other musical artists in this genre. "Daily" and "Unforgettable" were the label's first releases.

== Discography ==
Year	Title	Notes
2005	Desde Abajo	
2008	Gracias a Dios	
