= Desenfocao' =

2021 song by Rauw Alejandro

Promotional single by Rauw Alejandro

from the album Vice Versa
- Language: Spanish
- English title: "Unfocused"
- Released: August 10, 2021
- Genre: New wave; synth-pop; funk
- Length: 2:50
- Label: Sony
- Songwriters: Manuel Lara; Rafael E. Pabon Navedo "Rafa Pabón"; Jorge E. Pizarro "Kenobi"; José M. Collazo "Colla"; Eric Pérez Rovira "Eric Duars"; Raúl Alejandro Ocasio Ruiz "Rauw Alejandro"; Marcos Masís "Tainy"
- Producers: Manu Lara; Tainy

Rauw Alejandro Promotional singles chronology
"Perreo Pesau'" (2021)	"Desenfocao'" (2021)	"Nubes" (2021)

Music video
- "Desenfocao'" on YouTube

"Desenfocao'" (transl. "Unfocused") is a song recorded by Puerto Rican singer Rauw Alejandro for his second studio album, Vice Versa (2021). The song was written by Manuel Lara, Rafa Pabón, Kenobi, Colla, Eric Duars, Alejandro, and Tainy, while the production was handled by Lara and Tainy. It was released to Latin American radio stations by Sony Music on August 10, 2021, as the first promotional single from the album. A Spanish language new wave, synth-pop, and funk song, it finds the singer very confused after a relationship breakup, so that he barely even knows where he is.

"Desenfocao'" received widely positive reviews from music critics, who complimented its fusion of genres. The song peaked at number six on Monitor Latino's Honduras pop chart and was certified gold in Spain. An accompanying music video, released simultaneously with the song, was filmed as a long take and directed by Alejandro and NINE-D. It depicts the backstage of a concert, where Alejandro parties and enjoys his night right before the show. To promote the song, he performed "Desenfocao'" and "Cúrame" in a special two-song set with Billboard and Honda Stage.

== Background and release ==
Alejandro released his debut studio album, Afrodisíaco, on November 13, 2020. Two weeks after finishing the work on Afrodisíaco, he started working on his second studio album, Vice Versa. The latter was released for digital download and streaming by Sony Music Latin and Duars Entertainment on June 25, 2021, and "Desenfocao'" was included as the ninth track. During an interview with Vice, when he was asked if "Desenfocao'" was chosen as the next single from the album, Alejandro responded:

I would like the public to listen to the album and decide what my next single will be. If they tell me: "Let's make a video of this one," we'll make a video of that one. They are the ones who choose, let them decide.

On August 10, 2021, "Desenfocao'" was released to Latin American radio stations by Sony Music on August 10, 2021, as the first promotional single from the album.

== Music and lyrics ==
"Desenfocao'"
A 17-second sample of the song, which features an up-tempo melody.

Musically, "Desenfocao'" is a Spanish language new wave, synth-pop, and funk song, with elements of disco, pop, EDM, and deep house. The song uses cowbell and runs for a total of 2 minutes and 50 seconds. It was written by Manuel Lara, Rafa Pabón, Kenobi, Colla, Eric Duars, Alejandro, and Tainy, with its production being handled by Lara and Tainy. Lyrically, "Desenfocao'" which translates to "Unfocused" in English, finds the singer very confused after a relationship breakup, so that he barely even knows where he is. The lyrics include, "No sé a adónde voy, nadie sabe nada / Creo que estoy desenfocao' / Jangueando to' los día' / ¿Que salió el sol? No sabía" (I don't know where I'm going, nobody knows anything / I think I'm unfocused / Hanging out every day / When did the sun come up? I didn't know).

== Reception ==
Upon release, "Desenfocao'" was met with widely positive reviews from music critics. Julyssa Lopez from Rolling Stone, ranked the track among Alejandro's 10 Essential Songs, labeling it "One of Vice Versa's most interesting peaks". She described the song as "blurry" and called Tainy's production "spacey", stating that it "brings out the song's lysergic wooziness and helps Rauw swerve into unexpected directions". Writing for the same magazine, Lucas Villa highlighted the song as a "stunning standout" from the album and noted its fusion of genres. Also in his review for The Fader, he called it "intoxicating". Billboard critic T.M. Brown labeled it "a shimmering, stadium-ready track that shows off Alejandro's sonic and aesthetic range". Another author of Billboard named it a "hit". USA Today reviewer Pamela Avila described "Desenfocao'" and "La Old Skul" as "up-tempo songs perfect for the summer".

Piet Levy from Milwaukee Journal Sentinel mentioned "Desenfocao'" as a "standout" for Vice Versa, comparing it to The Weeknd's After Hours era: "With its moody synth waves and creamy pulsing beats, the track is like the perfect marriage of the Weeknd's '80s-inspired 'After Hours' era with the more reserved and enigmatic sound from the start of his career." Happy FM staff wrote that Alejandro has managed to leave his audience "speechless" with the release of the song, "that is leaving no one absolutely indifferent". The song peaked at number six on Monitor Latino's Honduras pop chart in August 2021. It later appeared on its respective year-end charts in 2021 and 2022. In 2024, it was certified gold by the Productores de Música de España (PROMUSICAE), for track-equivalent sales of over 30,000 units in Spain.

== Promotion ==
=== Music video ===
A screenshot from the music video, depicting Alejandro partying in the backstage of his concert.

An accompanying music video was released simultaneously with the song. The visual was directed by Alejandro and NINE-D. It depicts the backstage of a concert, where Alejandro parties and enjoys his night right before the show. The video was filmed as a long take with a glowing "psychedelic" filter that is "a little dazed and unsteady", as it is suggested by the song's title. In the final scene, the singer appears on the stage and starts singing behind a microphone in front of thousands of attendees.

=== Live performances ===
Alejandro gave a live performance of "Desenfocao'" and "Cúrame" in a special two-song set with Billboard and Honda Stage. For the former, he wore a "glossy all-white suit". "Desenfocao'" was also included on the set list for Alejandro's the Vice Versa World Tour.

== Credits and personnel ==
Credits adapted from Tidal.

- Rauw Alejandro – associated performer, composer, lyricist
- Manuel Lara – composer, lyricist, producer
- Rafael E. Pabon Navedo "Rafa Pabón" – composer, lyricist
- Jorge E. Pizarro "Kenobi" – composer, lyricist, recording engineer
- José M. Collazo "Colla" – composer, lyricist, mastering engineer, mixing engineer
- Eric Pérez Rovira "Eric Duars" – composer, lyricist
- Marcos Masís "Tainy" – composer, lyricist, producer

== Charts ==
=== Weekly charts ===
Weekly peak performance for "Desenfocao'"
Chart (2021–2022)	Peak position
Honduras Pop (Monitor Latino)	6

=== Year-end charts ===
2021 year-end chart performance for "Desenfocao'"
Chart (2021)	Position
Honduras Pop (Monitor Latino)	34

2022 year-end chart performance for "Desenfocao'"
Chart (2022)	Position
Honduras Pop (Monitor Latino)	74

== Certifications ==
Certifications and sales for "Desenfocao'"
Region	Certification	Certified units/sales
Mexico (AMPROFON)	Diamond+Gold	770,000^{‡}
Spain (Promusicae)	Gold	30,000^{‡}
^{‡} Sales+streaming figures based on certification alone.

== Release history ==
Release dates and formats for "Desenfocao'"
Region	Date	Format(s)	Label	Ref.
Latin America	August 10, 2021	Contemporary hit radio	Sony Music	
