= Todo de Ti =

2021 single by Rauw Alejandro

Single by Rauw Alejandro

from the album Vice Versa
- Language: Spanish
- English title: "Everything About You"
- Released: May 20, 2021
- Genre: Dance-pop; electropop
- Length: 3:19
- Label: Sony Latin; Duars
- Songwriters: Eric "Duars" Pérez Rovira; José M. Collazo "Colla"; Jairo Jhoau Bascope Ochoa; Luis J. González "Mr. NaisGai"; Rafael E. Pabón Navedo "Rafa Pabón"; Raul Alejandro Ocasio Ruiz "Rauw Alejandro"
- Producers: Mr. NaisGai; El Zorro "Rauw Alejandro"

Rauw Alejandro singles chronology
"Tiroteo (Remix)" (2021)	"Todo de Ti" (2021)	"Sexo Virtual" (2021)

Music video
- "Todo de Ti" on YouTube

"Todo de Ti" (transl. "Everything About You") is a song recorded by Puerto Rican singer Rauw Alejandro for his second studio album, Vice Versa (2021). It was written by Eric Duars, Colla, Mr. NaisGai, Rafa Pabón, Jairo Bascope and Alejandro, while the production was handled by Mr. NaisGai and Alejandro. The song was released for digital download and streaming by Sony Music Latin and Duars Entertainment on May 20, 2021, as the second single from the album. A Spanish language dance-pop and electropop song, it is about a girl who drives Alejandro crazy and makes his heart race, while he confesses he likes everything about her. The track received highly positive reviews from music critics, who complimented its fusion of genres and the singer's departure from his regular aesthetic.

"Todo de Ti" was ranked among the Best Summer Songs of All Time by Rolling Stone. It was nominated for both Record of the Year and Song of the Year at the 22nd Annual Latin Grammy Awards. The song was commercially successful, reaching number one in 18 countries, including Argentina and Spain, as well as the top three on Billboard's Hot Latin Songs and Billboard Global 200 charts, becoming the third all-Spanish song in history to reach the top three on the latter. The song has received several certifications, including Latin sextuple platinum in the United States. An accompanying music video, released simultaneously with the song, was directed by Marlon Peña. It depicts Alejandro dancing and roller skating in a roller rink. To promote the song, Alejandro performed it on several television programs and award shows, including the 2022 Billboard Music Awards.

== Background and release ==
Rauw Alejandro released his debut studio album, Afrodisíaco on November 13, 2020. Two weeks after finishing the work on Afrodisíaco, he started working on his second studio album, Vice Versa. While he was finalizing the album, he thought it was "incredible" but "felt like something was missing". He explains that although his debut album focused on his "musical roots", he "would never want to limit [himself] to a single genre" as he likes "things that are different" and he is "not afraid to try new things". He added: "I was in Puerto Rico and thought of experimenting with some creative sounds, crafting a single that would be perfect for the summer." Inspired by "old-school" genres, "Todo de Ti" became the last song to be recorded for Vice Versa. The song was "a totally different proposal" and he "took a risk". In an interview with Billboard, Alejandro told the magazine about the recording:

The most important thing in my music is the melodies. I began vibing in the studio with my producer Mr. Nais Gai and when I found the perfect melody, that’s when I began writing the concept of the song. I was so excited about the track that we finished it in two days.

In March 2021, Alejandro played the track for his label for the first time. The members of his team were surprised when they heard the song and Alejandro said: "I have this record, I feel it can be different, but I want to be ready with another one in case it doesn't work out." The senior manager of Sony Music Latin John Eddie Perez stated that "with 'Todo De Ti' there was a chance it wouldn't even make the album" and although they supported Alejandro, they "were a little skeptical of how it would work out".

On May 16, 2021, Alejandro teased the song on Instagram by sharing a video of himself sitting behind a drum set and playing to the rhythm of the song's beat. On May 20, 2021, "Todo de Ti" was released for digital download and streaming by Sony Music Latin and Duars Entertainment as the second single from Vice Versa. It was included as the first track on the album, released June 25, 2021. A summer remix of the song with Puerto Rican producer Caleb Calloway was released on July 22, 2021.

== Music and lyrics ==
"Todo de Ti"
A 19-second sample of the chorus, which features a fusion of genres.

Musically, "Todo de Ti", which was noted by the media for being different with Alejandro's "usual reggaeton and urban aesthetic", is a Spanish language dance-pop and electropop song, with elements of disco, pop, Latin pop, dance, electro, and nu-new-wave. The track was inspired by funk from the music of singers James Brown and Bruno Mars, as well as "the nostalgia of the 1980s". Alejandro states that "it has that eighties and old school vibe but with a summer vibe". The song was written by Eric Duars, Colla, Mr. NaisGai, Rafa Pabón, and Alejandro, with its production being handled by Mr. NaisGai and Alejandro. The track runs for a total of 3 minutes and 19 seconds. According to the song's sheet music on Musicnotes.com, "Todo de Ti" is composed in the key of D♯ minor with a groove of 128 beats per minute.

Lyrically, "Todo de Ti" which translates to "Everything About You" in English, is a romantic song about a girl who drives Alejandro crazy and makes his heart race, while the hopeless singer confesses he likes everything about her. The lyrics, which has been said to be dedicated to Alejandro's partner Rosalía, include: "Aceleraste mis latidos / Es que me gusta todo de ti / De to'as tus partes, ¿cuál decido? / Es que me gusta todo de ti" ("You accelerate all my heartbeats / It's because I like everything about you / Out of everything about you, which do I pick? / It's because I like everything about you").

== Critical reception ==
Upon release, "Todo de Ti" was met with universal acclaim from music critics. Lideny Villatoro from Univision referenced to the song's title and said that "you are going to love everything about this song". Writing for Billboard, Griselda Flores gave it a positive review, noting Alejandro's "departure from his signature urban-leaning sonority" and the track's "summer anthem potential" that allows the singer to "show off not only his dancing abilities and roller-skating skills, but also his chameleonic abilities to shift gears and go from hard-core reggaeton to a sweet, groovy pop tune". Also from Billboard, Joe Lynch described it as "genre-melding", Jessica Roiz called it "a phenomenon on TikTok", and Jason Lipshutz labeled it "a sweaty and jubilant dance track" that "makes its listeners immediately snap to attention". Billboard staff also recognized the track as "the undisputed song of the summer all around the world", while mentioning it as "the groovy, feel-good summer anthem". NPR reviewer Anamaria Sayre called the track "awesome", labeled it "a bop", and chose it as her song of the summer, since it takes her "to the boardwalk on roller skates mentally every single time [she] listen to it". In another article, she kept praising the song for being "as energetic as it is resonant", its "danceable beats", "snappy refrain", and "Alejandro's catchy tune", while naming it "the world-sprawling welcome party for new-wave Latin pop". She stated that it "proves that genre-bending doesn't require the collaboration of a representative artist from across space or time".

Rolling Stone critic Julyssa Lopez ranked "Todo de Ti" among Alejandro's 10 Essential Songs, highlighting the track's "spangled, disco-tinged arrangements" and the singer's "bright" vocals. In another article, she described the song "as shiny as a disco ball", while Elias Leight from the same magazine labeled it "an unusual sound in the current Latin mainstream" that became "a massive global hit". Rolling Stone staff also named it "a world-wide hit and a star-making coup for Alejandro" and stated that it is "a pop smash that rewired reggaeton's circuitry with its transportingly buoyant New Wave synths and plush disco groove". Also from Rolling Stone, Ernesto Lechner ranked the song as Alejandro's best song in 2022, describing it as "the Latin mega-hit of 2021". He stated that "years from now, fans will probably remember" the singer "as the artist who liberated" Latin music. Another Rolling Stone reviewer Lucas Villa described the song as "a sunny, disco-driven delight". In his review for The Fader, Villa called it "breezy" and "bright", stating that it "will be a flirty summertime swagger for years to come". Grammy.com critics Taylor Weatherby and Ernesto Lechner described the song as "irresistibly catchy" and a "blockbuster hit" in their articles, respectively. Nohelia Castro from People en Español celebrated "Tode de Ti" as "catchy", while an author of Monitor Latino praised the song for its "super catchy lyrics" and "unbeatable beat".

== Accolades ==
Rolling Stone, The Fader, NPR, the Los Angeles Times, Spotify, and Amazon Music hailed "Todo de Ti" as the best Latin song of 2021. It was named the eighth-best song of 2021 by Rolling Stone on both "The 50 Best Songs of 2021" and "Rob Sheffield's Top 25 Songs of 2021" lists. In The Fader and NPR, the song was placed in the sixth and seventh positions on their year-end lists, respectively. The Los Angeles Times named "Todo de Ti" the sixth-best song of the year, and Nylon listed it among their favorite songs of 2021. Billboard ranked it at number 12 on the list of "The 100 Best Songs of 2021", while placing it on an unranked list of "20 Best Latin Songs of 2021". Mitú ranked it at number two among the "21 Songs That Defined 2021". In 2022, Rolling Stone ranked the track as the 13th Best Summer Song of All Time. "Todo de Ti" has received a number of awards and nominations. It was nominated for both Record of the Year and Song of the Year at the 22nd Annual Latin Grammy Awards.

Awards and nominations for "Todo de Ti"
Organization	Year	Award	Result	Ref.
E40 Music Awards	2021	Song of the Year	Nominated	
FM Like Los+Likeados	2021	Song of the Year	Nominated	
Latin Grammy Awards	2021	Record of the Year	Nominated	
Latin Grammy Awards	2021	Song of the Year	Nominated	
LOS40 Music Awards	2021	Best Song – Latin	Won	
LOS40 Music Awards	2021	Best Music Video – Latin	Nominated	
Kids' Choice Awards Mexico	2021	Catchier Song	Nominated	
Premios Billboard Argentina	2021	Song of the Year – Iberoamérica	Won	
Premios Charts Ecuador	2021	International Song	Won	
Premios Lo Más Escuchado	2021	Song of the Year – International	Nominated	
Premios MUSA	2021	International Latin Song of the Year	Won	
Premios Quiero	2021	Best Urban Video	Nominated	
Premios Quiero	2021	Video of the Year	Nominated	
American Music Awards	2022	Favorite Latin Song	Nominated	
ASCAP Latin Awards	2022	Winning Song	Won	
Billboard Latin Music Awards	2022	Latin Airplay Song of the Year	Won	
Billboard Latin Music Awards	2022	Latin Pop Song of the Year	Won	
Billboard Music Awards	2022	Top Latin Song	Nominated	
iHeartRadio Music Awards	2022	Latin Song of the Year	Nominated	
Latin American Music Awards	2022	Song of the Year	Nominated	
Latin American Music Awards	2022	Favorite Song – Pop	Nominated	
Premio Lo Nuestro	2022	Song of the Year	Nominated	
Premio Lo Nuestro	2022	Urbano Pop-Urban Song of the Year	Nominated	
Premios Juventud	2022	Viral Track of the Year	Nominated	
Premios Juventud	2022	The Catchiest Song	Nominated	
Premios Juventud	2022	The Hottest Choreography	Nominated	
Premios Odeón	2022	Best Latin Song	Won	
Premios Tu Música Urbano	2022	Song of the Year	Nominated	
Premios Tu Música Urbano	2022	Video of the Year	Nominated	
TikTok Awards	2022	Favorite Musical Trend of the Year	Won	
BMI Latin Awards	2023	Award Winning Songs	Won	

== Commercial performance ==
"Todo de Ti" became Alejandro's breakthrough solo song and his biggest hit in his career to date. It turned into a huge global hit, peaking at number three on the Billboard Global 200, making it the third all-Spanish song in history to reach the top three. The song reached number two on Spotify's Daily Global chart, while breaking the record as the Spanish solo song the most streams in a single day. The track debuted at number nine on the US Billboard Hot Latin Songs chart on June 5, 2021, with a first-week tally of 500 downloads sold, 3.8 million streams, and 4 million radio impressions. Thus, it became Alejandro's first solo top 10 hit on the chart, and his fifth overall. It subsequently peaked at number two on the chart on September 11, 2021, being held off the top spot by "Pepas" (2021) by Farruko, while giving Alejandro his first top two track. "Todo de Ti" has since become Alejandro's longest-charting hit on the Hot Latin Songs, spending 43 weeks on the chart. The song also reached number one on the US Latin Digital Song Sales, Latin Airplay, Latin Rhythm Airplay, and Latin Pop Airplay charts. On Latin Pop Airplay, it stayed at the top for 28 weeks, making it the second longest-running number-one single on the chart in history.

"Todo de Ti" debuted at number 66 on the US Billboard Hot 100 on the chart issue dated June 12, 2021, and peaked at number 32 in its fifth week, becoming Alejandro's second entry on the chart and his highest peak in his career, surpassing "Baila Conmigo", which peaked at number 74 on February 13, 2021. "Todo de Ti" was certified sextuple platinum (Latin) by the Recording Industry Association of America (RIAA), for track-equivalent sales of over 360,000 units in the United States. In Canada, the song peaked at number 91 on Billboard's Canadian Hot 100 on the chart issue dated July 10, 2021, giving Alejandro his second entry, and was certified gold by the Music Canada, for track-equivalent sales of over 40,000 units in the country. Besides North America, the track hit the charts in several European countries, including France and Italy. It was certified gold by the Syndicat National de l'Édition Phonographique (SNEP), for track-equivalent sales of over 100,000 units in the former, and platinum by the Federazione Industria Musicale Italiana (FIMI), for track-equivalent sales of over 70,000 units in the latter.

In Spain's official weekly chart, the song debuted at number one on May 30, 2021, and spent a total of nine consecutive weeks at this position, becoming his second number-one hit in the country, following "La Nota" (2020). "Todo de Ti" was later certified 11× platinum by the Productores de Música de España (PROMUSICAE), for track-equivalent sales of over 660,000 units in the country, and finished 2021 as the biggest hit on the country's year-end chart. In Latin America, the song experienced a huge commercial success. It peaked at number one in Argentina, Bolivia, Chile, Colombia, Costa Rica, Dominican Republic, Ecuador, El Salvador, Guatemala, Honduras, Latin America, Mexico, Nicaragua, Panama, Paraguay, Peru, Puerto Rico, and Uruguay. The track was subsequently ranked as the best-performing song of 2021 in Latin America. In Mexico, the song was certified diamond + 4× platinum by the Asociación Mexicana de Productores de Fonogramas y Videogramas (AMPROFON), for track-equivalent sales of over 1,260,000 units. It was also certified platinum by Pro-Música Brasil for track-equivalent sales of over 40,000 units in Brazil.

== Music video ==
A screenshot from the music video, depicting Alejandro dancing in a roller rink.

An accompanying music video was released simultaneously with the song. The visual was directed by Dominican director Marlon Peña. It begins with Alejandro wearing headphones, playing drums in a garage. In another scene, he is seen with sunglasses, standing between two aisles of roller skates. A woman portrayed by Colombian model Valeria Morales asks him a question about the skates. At night, a man, portrayed by Alejandro himself, and Morales walk into a roller rink, while his main character begins dancing with roller skates in the middle of the rink. The man next to Morales, checks out her and talks to her, while Alejandro keeps dancing, and in the next scene, joined by his friends, faces the man and his friends in a dancing contest. American former basketball player Shaquille O'Neal also dances along with Alejandro. Subsequently, Alejandro and the man shake each other's hands. Awaken from the delusion, as he is wearing headphones, Alejandro turns back his head to Morales and shakes her head, answering her question with a "no". The music video was nominated for Best Music Video – Latin at the 2021 LOS40 Music Awards and Video of the Year at the 2022 Premios Tu Música Urbano.

== Live performances ==
On June 16, 2021, Alejandro gave his first live performance of "Todo de Ti" on The Kelly Clarkson Show. Almost one month later, he performed the song at the 2021 MTV Millennial Awards on July 13. His rendition was ranked among the top five performances of the ceremony by mitú: "He gave us everything we wanted out of this performance." On September 23, 2021, Alejandro, wearing a sleek overcoat, performed the track at the 2021 Billboard Latin Music Awards under a disco ball, while surrounded by multiple roller skaters dancing around him. In his review for Billboard, Joe Lynch praised "the backup dancers/skaters" for their "impressive unison", while stating the singer was "no slouch either" and "busted out some seriously fancy footwork, dancing with an effortless cool that was astonishing to see". On May 15, 2022, Alejandro performed a medley of "Cúrame", "Museo", and "Todo de Ti" at the 2022 Billboard Music Awards. Billboard critic Jessica Roiz described his performance as "energetic" and wrote: "In true Rauw fashion, his killer dance moves were the center of attention and had the crowd on its feet." "Todo de Ti" was also included on the set lists for Alejandro's the Rauw Alejandro World Tour and the Vice Versa Tour.

== Track listings ==
Digital download / streaming
No.	Title	Length
1.	"Todo de Ti"	3:19

Digital download / streaming
No.	Title	Length
1.	"Todo de Ti (Summer Remix)"	5:10

== Credits and personnel ==
Credits adapted from Billboard and Tidal.

- Rauw Alejandro – associated performer, composer, lyricist, producer
- Eric "Duars" Pérez Rovira – composer, lyricist, executive producer
- José M. Collazo "Colla" – composer, lyricist, mixing engineer, recording engineer
- Luis J. González "Mr. NaisGai" – composer, lyricist
- Jairo Bascope Ochoa – composer, lyricist
- Rafael E. Pabón Navedo "Rafa Pabón" – composer, lyricist
- Carlos Orlando Navarro – guitar, performance arranger
- Sensei Sound – mastering engineer

== Charts ==
=== Weekly charts ===
Weekly peak performance for "Todo de Ti"
Chart (2021–2023)	Peak position
Argentina Hot 100 (Billboard)	1
Argentina (Monitor Latino)	1
Bolivia (Monitor Latino)	1
Bolivia Songs (Billboard) (Note: The Hits of the World charts were launched in February 2022. Therefore, "Todo de Ti" did not have a full run on the chart.)	19
Brazil Latin Airplay (Crowley Charts)	10
Canada Hot 100 (Billboard)	91
Chile (Monitor Latino)	1
Colombia (Monitor Latino)	1
Colombia (National-Report)	1
Costa Rica (Monitor Latino)	1
Dominican Republic (Monitor Latino)	1
Ecuador (Monitor Latino)	1
Ecuador Songs (Billboard)	23
El Salvador (Monitor Latino)	1
France (SNEP)	74
Global 200 (Billboard)	3
Greece (IFPI)	81
Guatemala (Monitor Latino)	1
Honduras (Monitor Latino)	1
Italy (FIMI)	42
Latin America (Monitor Latino)	1
Lithuania (AGATA)	64
Mexico (Monitor Latino)	1
Mexico Airplay (Billboard)	2
Mexico Songs (Billboard)	12
Mexico Streaming (AMPROFON)	1
New Zealand Hot Singles (Recorded Music NZ)	36
Nicaragua (Monitor Latino)	1
Panama (Monitor Latino)	1
Paraguay (Monitor Latino)	1
Peru (Monitor Latino)	1
Peru Songs (Billboard)	15
Peru Streaming (UNIMPRO)	1
Portugal (AFP)	23
Puerto Rico (Monitor Latino)	1
Spain (Promusicae)	1
Sweden Heatseeker (Sverigetopplistan)	13
Switzerland (Schweizer Hitparade)	44
Uruguay (Monitor Latino)	1
US Billboard Hot 100	32
US Hot Latin Songs (Billboard)	2
US Latin Airplay (Billboard)	1
US Latin Pop Airplay (Billboard)	1
US Latin Rhythm Airplay (Billboard)	1
US Rolling Stone Top 100	25
Venezuela (Monitor Latino)	2

=== Monthly charts ===
Monthly chart position for "Todo de Ti"
Chart (2021–2022)	Peak position
Paraguay (SGP)	2
Uruguay (CUDISCO)	1

=== Year-end charts ===
2021 year-end chart performance for "Todo de Ti"
Chart (2021)	Position
Argentina (Monitor Latino)	2
Bolivia (Monitor Latino)	3
Chile (Monitor Latino)	1
Colombia (Monitor Latino)	5
Costa Rica (Monitor Latino)	1
Dominican Republic (Monitor Latino)	9
Ecuador (Monitor Latino)	3
El Salvador (Monitor Latino)	1
Global 200 (Billboard)	33
Guatemala (Monitor Latino)	11
Honduras (Monitor Latino)	3
Latin America (Monitor Latino)	1
Mexico (Monitor Latino)	4
Nicaragua (Monitor Latino)	3
Panama (Monitor Latino)	3
Paraguay (Monitor Latino)	2
Peru (Monitor Latino)	3
Portugal (AFP)	93
Puerto Rico (Monitor Latino)	7
Spain (PROMUSICAE)	1
Switzerland (Schweizer Hitparade)	90
Uruguay (Monitor Latino)	1
US Billboard Hot 100	100
US Hot Latin Songs (Billboard)	6
US Latin Airplay (Billboard)	3
US Latin Pop Airplay (Billboard)	1
US Latin Rhythm Airplay (Billboard)	3
Venezuela (Monitor Latino)	1

2022 year-end chart performance for "Todo de Ti"
Chart (2022)	Position
Argentina (Monitor Latino)	9
Bolivia (Monitor Latino)	22
Chile (Monitor Latino)	16
Colombia (Monitor Latino)	20
Costa Rica (Monitor Latino)	10
Dominican Republic (Monitor Latino)	66
Ecuador (Monitor Latino)	5
El Salvador (Monitor Latino)	7
Global 200 (Billboard)	159
Guatemala (Monitor Latino)	14
Honduras (Monitor Latino)	66
Latin America (Monitor Latino)	14
Nicaragua (Monitor Latino)	42
Panama (Monitor Latino)	4
Paraguay (Monitor Latino)	15
Peru (Monitor Latino)	45
Puerto Rico Pop (Monitor Latino)	42
Spain (PROMUSICAE)	31
Uruguay (Monitor Latino)	29
US Hot Latin Songs (Billboard)	27
US Latin Airplay (Billboard)	6
US Latin Pop Airplay (Billboard)	4
US Latin Rhythm Airplay (Billboard)	4
Venezuela (Monitor Latino)	31

2023 year-end chart performance for "Todo de Ti"
Chart (2023)	Position
Argentina Latino (Monitor Latino)	92
Central America (Monitor Latino)	65
Chile Pop (Monitor Latino)	39
Costa Rica (Monitor Latino)	73
Dominican Republic Pop (Monitor Latino)	27
Ecuador (Monitor Latino)	35
El Salvador (Monitor Latino)	46
Guatemala (Monitor Latino)	79
Honduras Pop (Monitor Latino)	16
Latin America (Monitor Latino)	90
Nicaragua Pop (Monitor Latino)	19
Panama (Monitor Latino)	49
Peru Pop (Monitor Latino)	24
Puerto Rico Pop (Monitor Latino)	49
Venezuela Pop (Monitor Latino)	55

== Certifications ==
Certifications and sales for "Todo de Ti"
Region	Certification	Certified units/sales
Argentina (CAPIF)	Platinum	20,000^{*}
Brazil (Pro-Música Brasil)	Platinum	40,000^{‡}
Canada (Music Canada)	Gold	40,000^{‡}
France (SNEP)	Platinum	200,000^{‡}
Italy (FIMI)	2× Platinum	200,000^{‡}
Mexico (AMPROFON)	3× Diamond+Platinum	2,240,000^{‡}
Portugal (AFP)	Platinum	10,000^{‡}
Spain (Promusicae)	12× Platinum	720,000^{‡}
Switzerland (IFPI Switzerland)	Gold	10,000^{‡}
United States (RIAA)	6× Platinum (Latin)	360,000^{‡}
Streaming
Central America (CFC)	Diamond	35,000,000^{†}
^{*} Sales figures based on certification alone.^{‡} Sales+streaming figures based on certification alone.^{†} Streaming-only figures based on certification alone.

== Release history ==
Release dates and formats for "Todo de Ti"
Region	Date	Format	Version	Label	Ref(s)
Various	May 20, 2021	Digital download; streaming	Original	Sony Latin; Duars	
Latin America	May 20, 2021	Contemporary hit radio	Original	Sony Latin; Duars	
Italy	May 28, 2021	Contemporary hit radio	Original	Sony Latin; Duars	
Various	July 22, 2021	Digital download; streaming	Summer Remix	Sony Latin; Duars	
Russia	August 13, 2021	Contemporary hit radio	Original	Sony Latin; Duars	

== See also ==
- 2021 in Latin music
- List of best-selling singles in Spain
- List of Billboard Argentina Hot 100 number-one singles of 2021
- List of Billboard Hot Latin Songs and Latin Airplay number ones of 2021
- List of Billboard Latin Pop Airplay number ones of 2021
- List of Billboard Latin Pop Airplay number ones of 2022
- List of Latin songs on the Billboard Hot 100
- List of number-one songs of 2021 (Panama)
- List of number-one singles of 2021 (Spain)
