= 2021 in Latin music =

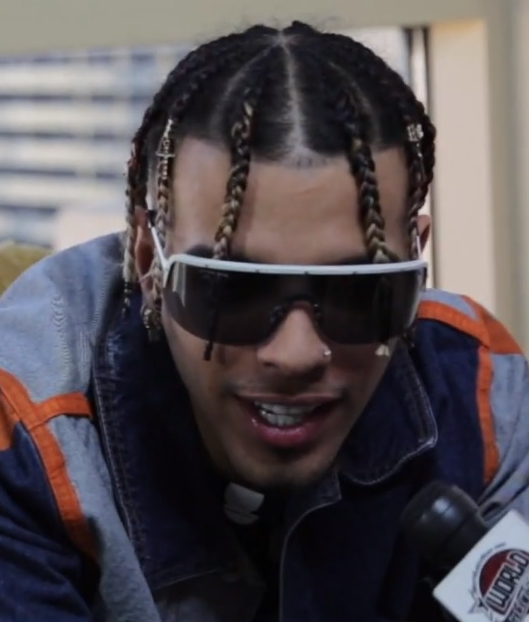
Puerto Rican rapper Rauw Alejandro was named Top New Latin Artist of the Year in the United States by Billboard

The following events and new music happened in 2021 in the Latin music industry. Latin regions include Ibero-America, Spain, Portugal, and the United States.

== Events ==
=== January–March ===
- February 18 – The 33rd Annual Lo Nuestro Awards are held at the American Airlines Arena in Miami, Florida.
  - YHLQMDLG by Bad Bunny wins Album of the Year.
  - "Tusa" by Karol G and Nicki Minaj wins Song of the Year
  - Nicki Nicole and Camilo win New Female Artist and New Male Artist, respectively
- March 2 – Journalist Leila Cobo publishes La Fórmula "Despacito": Los Hits de la Música Latina Contados por sus Artistas.
- March 10 – The 2nd Annual Premios Odeón take place virtually from Madrid.
  - David Bisbal wins Best Pop Album for En Tus Planes.
  - Posible by Enrique Bunbury wins Best Rock Album.
  - Back to Rookport by Kid Keo takes the award for Best Urban Album.
  - Amor by Israel Fernández and Diego Del Morao wins Best Flamenco Album.
  - De Vent i Ales by Txarango wins the award for Best Alternative Album.
- March 12 – Revelación, the first Spanish-language project by Selena Gomez, is released. It debuted at number 22 on the US Billboard 200, shifting 23,000 equivalent album units in its first week of release, marking the biggest sales week for a Latin album by a woman since Shakira's El Dorado in 2017. It also debuted atop the Billboard Top Latin Albums chart, becoming the first album by a woman to do so, also since El Dorado.
- March 14 – The 63rd Grammy Awards are held at Los Angeles Convention Center in Los Angeles, California.
  - Bad Bunny receives his first ever Grammy Award by winning Best Latin Pop or Urban Album for YHLQMDLG.
  - Fito Páez also wins his first Grammy Award by winning Best Latin Rock or Alternative Album for La Conquista del Espacio.
  - Natalia Lafourcade receives her second career Grammy Award by winning Best Regional Mexican Music Album (including Tejano) for Un Canto Por México, Vol. 1.
  - Grupo Niche's 40 wins Best Tropical Latin Album.

=== April–June ===
- April 15 – The Latin American Music Awards of 2021 take place at BB&T Center in Sunrise, Florida.
  - Bad Bunny wins a total of five awards including Artist of the Year, Favorite Male Artist and Album of the Year for YHLQMDLG.
  - Anitta wins Favorite Female Artist
  - Rauw Alejandro wins New Artist of the Year
  - "De Una Vez" by Selena Gomez wins Favorite Video
- April 30 – The Recording Academy drop anonymous nominating committees after controversies surrounding previous Grammy Award ceremonies but remain in-place for Latin Grammys. Urbano music receives its own category at the Grammys named Best Música Urbana Album, expanding to five the Latin categories within future galas.
- May 4 – The Latin Alternative Music Conference takes place in New York City.
- May 9 – The Latin Recording Academy present Ellas y Su Música to celebrate the experience of women in music with a television special.
- May 17 – The Premios Nuestra Tierra 2021 take place virtually from Bogotá to celebrate the best in Colombian music.
  - Camilo wins Artist of the Year.
  - Colores by J Balvin wins Album of the Year.
  - "Hawái" by Maluma wins Song of the Year.
  - Kali Uchis wins Best New Artist.
- May 19 – Balearic group Antònia Font announce their reunion concert after an eight-year hiatus, scheduled for June 11, 2022, at Primavera Sound.
- May 23 – The 28th Annual Billboard Music Awards are held at Microsoft Theater in Los Angeles, California.
  - Bad Bunny wins Top Latin Artist.
  - YHLQMDLG by Bad Bunny wins Top Latin Album.
  - "Dakiti" by Bad Bunny and Jhay Cortez wins Top Latin Song.
- May 25 – Spanish hip hop supergroup La Mafia del Amor announce their reunion concert, scheduled for June 11, 2022, at Primavera Sound.
- May 27 – The 8th iHeartRadio Music Awards are held at the Dolby Theatre in Los Angeles, California.
  - J Balvin wins Latin Artist of the Year.
  - YHLQMDLG by Bad Bunny wins Latin Album of the Year.
  - "Tusa" by Karol G and Nicki Minaj wins Latin Song of the Year.
  - Rauw Alejandro wins Best New Latin Artist.
- June 9 – The 5th Premios Pulsar take place live from a studio in Santiago to celebrate the best in Chilean music.
  - Cami wins Artist of the Year.
  - Naturaleza Muerta by Como Asesinar a Felipes wins Album of the Year.
  - "Flotando" by Francisca Valenzuela wins Song of the Year.
  - Pau wins Best New Artist.

=== July–September ===
- July 1 – The 5th Heat Latin Music Awards take place in Dominican Republic.
  - Nicky Jam wins Best Male Artist
  - Danna Paola wins Best Female Artist
  - "Mi Niña (Remix)" by Wisin, Myke Towers and Maluma featuring Anitta wins Best Video
  - "Ella No Es Tuya" by Rochy RD, Myke Towers and Nicki Nicole wins Best Collaboration
  - Boza wins Best New Artist
- July 23 – The 23rd Annual Premios Gardel take place live from a studio in Buenos Aires to celebrate the best in Argentinian music.
  - La Conquista del Espacio by Fito Páez wins Album of the Year.
  - "Ladrón" by Lali featuring Cazzu wins Song of the Year.
  - "Buenos Aires" by Nathy Peluso wins Record of the Year.
  - Nathy Peluso wins Best New Artist and becomes the most awarded act of the night after also winning Best Alternative Pop Album for Calambre and Best Urban/Trap Song for "Bzrp Music Sessions, Vol. 36".
- August 1 – Gabriel Abaroa steps down as the CEO of the Latin Recording Academy, with Manuel Abud taking his place. Abaroa is named president emeritus.
- September 12 – "Lo Vas a Olvidar" by Billie Eilish and Rosalía wins Best Latin at the 2021 MTV Video Music Awards.
- September 23 – The 28th Billboard Latin Music Awards take place at Watsco Center in Coral Gables, Florida.
  - Bad Bunny wins Artist of the Year.
  - Myke Towers wins New Artist of the Year.

=== October–December ===
- October 18 – Billboard celebrates the 2021 Latin Power Players event in Miami with more than 65 executives representing top music companies.
- October 22 – El Alfa becomes the first dembow artist to sell out Madison Square Garden.
- November 8 – Spotify launches a new campaign titled Elevando Nuestra Música around the platform's flagship Latin music playlist, Viva Latino.
- November 12 – The 16th LOS40 Music Awards take place at Velòdrom Illes Balears in Palma de Mallorca.
  - Vértigo by Pablo Alborán wins Best Spanish Album.
  - "Portales" by Dani Martín wins Best Spanish Song.
  - Sebastián Yatra wins Best Latin Artist.
  - "Todo de Ti" by Rauw Alejandro wins Best Latin Song.
- November 14 – The 28th MTV Europe Music Awards air on MTV live from Budapest.
  - Maluma wins Best Lati
  - Manu Gavassi wins Best Brazilian Act.
  - Alemán wins Best Latin America North Act.
  - Sebastián Yatra wins Best Latin America Central Act.
  - Tini wins Best Latin America South Act.
  - Diogo Piçarra wins Best Portuguese Act.
  - Aitana wins Best Spanish Act.
- November 18 – The 22nd Annual Latin Grammy Awards take place at MGM Grand Garden Arena in Las Vegas.
  - Salswing! by Rubén Blades and Roberto Delgado & Orquesta wins Album of the Year.
  - "Talvez" by Caetano Veloso and Tom Veloso wins Record of the Year, becoming the first Portuguese-language song to do so.
  - "Patria y Vida" written by Yotuel, Gente de Zona, Descemer Bueno, Maykel Osorbo, Beatriz Luengo, and El Funky wins Song of the Year.
  - Juliana Velásquez wins Best New Artist.
  - Camilo becomes the most awarded act of the night, winning four out of ten nominations.
- December 19 – Aventura's reunion tour finalizes at the Olympic Stadium in Santo Domingo.

== Number-one albums and singles by country ==
- List of Billboard Argentina Hot 100 number-one singles of 2021
- List of number-one albums of 2021 (Portugal)
- List of number-one albums of 2021 (Spain)
- List of number-one singles of 2021 (Spain)
- List of number-one Billboard Latin Albums from the 2020s
- List of Billboard number-one Latin songs of 2021

== Awards ==
=== Latin music awards ===
- 33rd Lo Nuestro Awards
- 2021 Billboard Latin Music Awards
- 2021 Latin American Music Awards
- 2021 Latin Grammy Awards
- 2021 Heat Latin Music Awards
- 2021 MTV Millennial Awards

=== Awards with Latin categories ===
- 28th Billboard Music Awards
- 63rd Grammy Awards
- 8th iHeartRadio Music Awards
- 16th Los40 Music Awards
- 38th MTV Video Music Awards
- 23rd Teen Choice Awards
- 2nd Premios Odeón

== Spanish- and Portuguese-language songs on the Billboard Global 200 ==
The Billboard Global 200 is a weekly record chart published by Billboard magazine that ranks the top songs globally based on digital sales and online streaming from over 200 territories worldwide. So far, in 2021, a total of 14 Spanish- and Portuguese-language songs have debuted in the Billboard Global 200.

Song	Performer(s)	Entry	Peak	Weeks	Ref.
2020 entries
"Hawái"	Maluma (solo or featuring The Weeknd)	September 19, 2020	3	60	
"La Curiosidad"	DJ Nelson featuring Jay Wheeler & Myke Towers	September 19, 2020	40	51	
"Relación"	Sech, Daddy Yankee and J Balvin featuring Rosalía and Farruko	September 19, 2020	13	31	
"Caramelo"	Ozuna, Karol G and Myke Towers	September 19, 2020	16	26	
"Tattoo"	Rauw Alejandro and Camilo	September 19, 2020	28	22	
"Un Día (One Day)"	J Balvin, Dua Lipa, Bad Bunny, and Tainy	September 19, 2020	30	30	
"Ay, Dios Mío!"	Karol G	September 19, 2020	25	20	
"Parce"	Maluma featuring Lenny Tavárez and Justin Quiles	September 19, 2020	49	21	
"Tusa"	Karol G, and Nicki Minaj	September 19, 2020	109	18	
"Despacito"	Luis Fonsi and Daddy Yankee featuring Justin Bieber	September 19, 2020	114	91	
"La Jeepeta"	Nio García, Anuel AA, Myke Towers, Brray, and Juanka	September 19, 2020	29	19	
"Despeinada"	Ozuna and Camilo	September 19, 2020	54	16	
"La Tóxica"	Farruko	September 26, 2020	24	25	
"Una Locura"	Ozuna, J Balvin, and Chencho Corleone	September 26, 2020	74	20	
"Se Te Nota"	Lele Pons and Guaynaa	October 3, 2020	44	18	
"Jeans"	Justin Quiles	October 3, 2020	78	13	
"Vida de Rico"	Camilo	October 10, 2020	29	24	
"La Nota"	Manuel Turizo, Myke Towers, and Rauw Alejandro	October 24, 2020	59	24	
"Mi Niña"	Los Legendarios, Wisin and Myke Towers	October 24, 2020	82	20	
"Bichota"	Karol G	November 7, 2020	7	30	
"Chica Ideal"	Guaynaa and Sebastián Yatra	November 7, 2020	74	18	
"Recairei"	Os Barões da Pisadinha	November 7, 2020	178	4	
"Dakiti"	Bad Bunny and Jhay Cortez	November 14, 2020	1	111	
"Reloj"	Rauw Alejandro and Anuel AA	November 14, 2020	41	33	
"Feliz Navidad"	José Feliciano	November 28, 2020	5	38	
"Polvo"	Nicky Jam and Myke Towers	December 5, 2020	173	5	
"La Noche de Anoche"	Bad Bunny and Rosalía	December 12, 2020	7	37	
"Te Mudaste"	Bad Bunny	December 12, 2020	19	17	
"Booker T"	Bad Bunny	December 12, 2020	45	8	
"Bebé"	Camilo and El Alfa	December 19, 2020	59	14	
"Amor ou o Litrão (Brega Funk)"	Mila, Menor Nico, and Petter Ferraz	December 19, 2020	125	4	
"Hecha Pa' Mí"	Boza	December 26, 2020	43	22	
2021 entries
"Bandido"	Myke Towers and Juhn	January 9, 2021	11	30	
"Modo Turbo"	Luísa Sonza and Pabllo Vittar featuring Anitta	January 9, 2021	126	2	
BZRP Music Sessions, Vol. 36	Bizarrap and Nathy Peluso	January 9, 2021	121	5	
"Segue Sua Vida"	Zé Neto & Cristiano	January 16, 2021	113	1	
"Si Me Tomo una Cerveza"	Migrantes & Alico	January 16, 2021	138	4	
"De Una Vez"	Selena Gomez	January 30, 2021	40	1	
"Lo Vas a Olvidar"	Billie Eilish and Rosalía	February 6, 2021	18	3	
"Ropa Cara"	Camilo	February 6, 2021	47	7	
"Antes"	Anuel AA and Ozuna	February 6, 2021	76	3	
"Los Dioses"	Anuel AA and Ozuna	February 6, 2021	92	1	
"No Te Enamores"	Milly, Farruko, Nio García, Jay Wheeler and Amenazzy	February 6, 2021	132	8	
"Meia Noite (Você tem meu WhatsApp)"	Tarcísio do Acordeon	February 6, 2021	189	1	
"Ele É Ele, Eu Sou Eu"	Os Barões da Pisadinha and Wesley Safadão	February 6, 2021	160	4	
"Baila Conmigo"	Selena Gomez and Rauw Alejandro	February 13, 2021	22	20	
"Esquema Preferido"	DJ Ivis featuring Tarcísio do Acordeon	February 13, 2021	152	3	
"Hasta Abajo"	Kevin Roldán, Bryant Myers, and Lyanno	February 13, 2021	165	5	
"Location"	Karol G, Anuel AA and J Balvin	February 27, 2021	63	10	
"Ella No Es Tuya"	Rochy RD, Myke Towers, and Nicki Nicole	February 27, 2021	39	13	
"Facas"	Diego & Victor Hugo and Bruno & Marrone	February 27, 2021	159	6	
"Telepatía"	Kali Uchis	March 6, 2021	10	28	
"Tapão Na Raba"	Raí Saia Rodada	March 6, 2021	94	10	
"#Problema"	Daddy Yankee	March 13, 2021	131	2	
"911"	Sech and Jhay Cortez	March 13, 2021	43	31	
"Además de Mí"	Rusherking, Tiago PZK, KHEA, Duki, María Becerra and Lit Killah	March 20, 2021	98	3	
"Machu Picchu"	Camilo and Evaluna Montaner	March 20, 2021	117	4	
"Batom de Cereja"	Israel & Rodolffo	March 27, 2021	57	12	
"Travesuras"	Nio García, Casper Mágico, Ozuna, Wisin, Yandel, Myke Towers and Flow La Movie	March 27, 2021	100	6	
"Fiel"	Los Legendarios, Wisin and Jhay Cortez	March 27, 2021	13	34	
"Tu Veneno"	J Balvin	April 3, 2021	189	1	
"El Makinón"	Karol G and Mariah Angeliq	April 10, 2021	39	23	
"AM"	Nio García, J Balvin and Bad Bunny	April 24, 2021	10	47	
"Otra Noche Sin Ti"	J Balvin and Khalid	April 24, 2021	72	3	
"Volta Bebê, Volta Neném"	DJ Guuga and DJ Ivis	May 1, 2021	65	6	
"Pareja del Año"	Sebastián Yatra and Myke Towers	May 1, 2021	16	27	
"Liberdade (Quando o Grave Bate Forte)"	Alok, MC Don Juan and DJ GBR	May 1, 2021	175	2	
"Botella tras Botella"	Gera MX and Christian Nodal	May 8, 2021	9	20	
"Miénteme"	TINI and María Becerra	May 15, 2021	65	26	
"Girl from Rio"	Anitta	May 15, 2021	164	1	
"Bipolar"	MC Don Juan, MC Davi and MC Pedrinho	May 22, 2021	98	8	
"2/Catorce"	Rauw Alejandro and Mr. Naisgai	May 22, 2021	43	19	
"Poblado"	Crissin, Totoy El Frío and Natan & Shander	May 29, 2021	86	6	
"Tipo Gin (Ao Vivo)"	Kevin O Chris	May 29, 2021	156	2	
"Ram Pam Pam"	Natti Natasha and Becky G	May 29, 2021	52	14	
"La Mamá de la Mamá"	El Alfa, CJ and Chael Produciendo featuring El Cherry Scom	May 29, 2021	195	2	
"Todo de Ti"	Rauw Alejandro	June 5, 2021	3	50	
"Sal y Perrea"	Sech, Daddy Yankee and J Balvin	June 5, 2021	82	10	
"512"	Mora and Jhay Cortez	June 5, 2021	138	4	
"100 Millones"	Bad Bunny and Luar La L	June 12, 2021	143	1	
"Qué Más Pues?"	J Balvin and María Becerra	June 12, 2021	17	31	
"Yonaguni"	Bad Bunny	June 19, 2021	3	73	
"BZRP Music Sessions, Vol. 40"	Bizarrap and Eladio Carrión	June 26, 2021	162	1	
"Poblado (Remix)"	J Balvin, Karol G and Nicky Jam featuring Crissin, Totoy El Frío and Natan & Shander	July 3, 2021	47	14	
"Baby Me Atende"	Matheus Fernandes and Dilsinho	July 3, 2021	152	5	
"2:50"	Duki, TINI and MYA	July 10, 2021	136	3	
"BZRP Music Sessions, Vol. 41"	Bizarrap and Nicky Jam	July 17, 2021	26	5	
"Meu Pedaço de Pecado"	João Gomes	July 17, 2021	74	10	
"In Da Getto"	J Balvin and Skrillex	July 17, 2021	39	21	
"Tiroteo"	Marc Seguí, Pol Granch and Rauw Alejandro	July 17, 2021	63	20	
"De Museo"	Bad Bunny	July 17, 2021	59	3	
"Não, Não Vou"	Mari Fernández	July 17, 2021	166	2	
"No Me Conocen"	Rei, Duki, Bandido and Tiago PZK	July 17, 2021	184	2	
"Volando"	Mora, Bad Bunny and Sech	July 24, 2021	27	31	
"Sobrio"	Maluma	July 24, 2021	52	30	
"Loco"	Justin Quiles, Chimbala and Zion & Lennox	July 24, 2021	93	10	
"Kesi"	Camilo and Shawn Mendes	July 31, 2021	105	2	
"Pepas"	Farruko	July 31, 2021	7	87	
"Entre Nosotros"	Tiago PZK, Lit Killah, Nicki Nicole and María Becerra	July 31, 2021	41	26	
"Se For Amor"	João Gomes and Vitor Fernandes	July 31, 2021	156	6	
"Aquelas Coisas"	João Gomes	August 7, 2021	158	4	
"Fulanito"	Becky G and El Alfa	August 7, 2021	140	4	
"Paris"	Ingratax	August 7, 2021	63	12	
"Volví"	Aventura and Bad Bunny	August 14, 2021	11	37	
"YaMeFui"	Bizarrap, Duki and Nicki Nicole	August 14, 2021	181	1	
"Cúrame"	Rauw Alejandro	August 21, 2021	71	16	
"Quer Voar"	Matuê	August 28, 2021	139	1	
"Chega e Senta"	John Amplificado	September 4, 2021	140	3	
"Ley Seca"	Jhay Cortez and Anuel AA	September 18, 2021	79	12	
"Arranhão"	Henrique & Juliano	September 18, 2021	129	9	
"Una Nota"	J Balvin and Sech	September 25, 2021	75	4	
"Nostálgico"	Rvssian, Rauw Alejandro and Chris Brown	September 25, 2021	81	22	
"A la Antigüita"	Calibre 50	September 25, 2021	148	5	
"Sejodioto"	Karol G	October 9, 2021	96	3	
"Jugaste y Sufrí"	Eslabón Armado featuring DannyLux	October 9, 2021	111	8	
"Lo Siento BB"	Tainy, Bad Bunny and Julieta Venegas	October 16, 2021	12	44	
"El Incomprendido"	Farruko, Víctor Cárdenas and DJ Adoni	October 16, 2021	145	1	
"Está Dañada"	Iván Cornejo	October 16, 2021	73	6	
"Fue Mejor"	Kali Uchis and PartyNextDoor or SZA	October 16, 2021	187	1	
"Ya Supérame (En Vivo)"	Grupo Firme	October 16, 2021	198	1	
"Ateo"	C. Tangana and Nathy Peluso	October 23, 2021	140	1	
"Coração Cachorro"	Avine Vinny and Matheus Fernandes	October 23, 2021	96	6	
"Revoada No Colchão"	Zé Felipe and Marcynho Sensação	October 23, 2021	174	1	
"Índigo"	Camilo and Evaluna	October 30, 2021	48	6	
"SG"	DJ Snake, Ozuna, Lisa and Megan Thee Stallion	November 6, 2021	19	5	
"Dictadura"	Anuel AA	November 13, 2021	159	1	
"Nuestra Canción"	Monsieur Periné featuring Vicente García	November 13, 2021	182	1	
"Esqueça-me se for Capaz"	Marília Mendonça and Maiara & Maraisa	November 20, 2021	97	8	
"Todo Mundo Menos Você"	Marília Mendonça and Maiara & Maraisa	November 20, 2021	112	4	
"BZRP Music Sessions, Vol. 46"	Bizarrap and Anuel AA	November 20, 2021	122	1	
"Salimo de Noche"	Tiago PZK and Trueno	November 20, 2021	136	4	
"Mon Amour"	Zzoilo	November 20, 2021	73	23	
"La Fama"	Rosalía featuring The Weeknd	November 27, 2021	34	16	
"Bar"	TINI and L-Gante	November 27, 2021	125	4	
"Ameaça"	Paulo Pires, MC Danny and Marcynho Sensação	November 27, 2021	110	5	
"Súbelo"	Anuel AA, Myke Towers and Jhay Cortez	December 4, 2021	114	2	
"Presepada"	Marília Mendonça and Maiara & Maraisa	December 4, 2021	170	3	
"Dance Crip"	Trueno	December 11, 2021	169	2	
"Medallo"	Blessd, Justin Quiles and Lenny Tavárez	December 11, 2021	80	23	
"Tacones Rojos"	Sebastián Yatra	December 18, 2021	72	24	

== Spanish-language songs on the Billboard Hot 100 ==
The Billboard Hot 100 ranks the most-played songs in the United States based on sales (physical and digital), radio play, and online streaming. Also included are certifications awarded by the Recording Industry Association of America (RIAA) based on digital downloads and on-demand audio and/or video song streams: gold certification is awarded for sales of 500,000 copies, platinum for one million units, and multi-platinum for two million units, and following in increments of one million thereafter. The RIAA also awards Spanish-language songs under the Latin certification: Disco de Oro (Gold) is awarded for sales 30,000 certification copies, Disco de Platino (Platinum) for 60,000 units, and Disco de Multi-Platino (Multi-Platinum) for 120,000 units, and following in increments of 60,000 thereafter. So far, in 2021, four Spanish-language songs have debuted in the Billboard Hot 100.

Song	Performer(s)	Entry	Peak	Weeks	RIAA certification	Ref.
2017 entries
"Feliz Navidad"	José Feliciano	January 7, 2017	6	43		
2020 entries
"Hawái"	Maluma (solo or feat. The Weeknd)	September 5, 2020	12	21	62× Platinum (combined) (Latin)	
"Dakiti"	Bad Bunny and Jhay Cortez	November 14, 2020	5	28	24× Platinum (Latin)	
"Bichota"	Karol G	December 12, 2020	72	13	20× Platinum (Latin)	
"La Noche de Anoche"	Bad Bunny and Rosalía	December 12, 2020	53	17		
2021 entries
"De Una Vez"	Selena Gomez	January 30, 2021	92	1		
"Lo Vas a Olvidar"	Billie Eilish and Rosalía	February 6, 2021	62	1		
"Antes"	Anuel AA and Ozuna	February 6, 2021	100	1		
"Baila Conmigo"	Selena Gomez and Rauw Alejandro	February 13, 2021	74	2		
"Bandido"	Myke Towers and Juhn	February 20, 2021	82	7	3× Platinum (Latin)	
"Telepatía"	Kali Uchis	March 6, 2021	25	25	2× Platinum	
"Botella Tras Botella"	Gera MX and Christian Nodal	May 8, 2021	60	4	14× Platinum (Latin)	
"Todo de Ti"	Rauw Alejandro	June 12, 2021	32	20	6× Platinum (Latin)	
"Yonaguni"	Bad Bunny	June 19, 2021	10	20		
"Fiel"	Los Legendarios, Wisin and Jhay Cortez	June 26, 2021	62	9		
"AM"	Nio García, J Balvin and Bad Bunny	July 10, 2021	41	10	27× Platinum (combined) (Latin)	
"Volando"	Mora, Bad Bunny and Sech	July 24, 2021	89	1		
"De Museo"	Bad Bunny	July 24, 2021	94	1		
"Pepas"	Farruko	August 7, 2021	25	21	52× Platinum (Latin)	
"Volví"	Aventura and Bad Bunny	August 14, 2021	22	18		
"In Da Getto"	J Balvin and Skrillex	September 11, 2021	90	3		
"Jugaste y Sufrí"	Eslabón Armado featuring DannyLux	October 16, 2021	69	7		
"Está Dañada"	Iván Cornejo	October 16, 2021	61	5		
"Lo Siento BB"	Tainy, Bad Bunny and Julieta Venegas	October 23, 2021	51	4	28× Platinum (Latin)	
"Ya Supérame (En Vivo)"	Grupo Firme	October 30, 2021	91	3		
"La Fama"	Rosalía feat. the Weeknd	November 27, 2021	94	1	Gold	

== Albums released ==
The following is a list of notable Latin albums (music performed in Spanish or Portuguese) (Note: In the United States, Billboard and the RIAA recognizes an album as "Latin" if 51% or more of its content is sung in the Spanish language. The Latin Recording Academy extends this definition of "Latin music" to include Portuguese-language records as well as other languages and dialects of Ibero-America such as Catalan, Nahuatl, Quechua, Galician, Valencia, and Mayan. The Latin Recording Academy also includes Latin instrumental recordings performed by Ibero-American musicians. Note that Spain and Portugal are included under this definition of Ibero-America.) that have been released in Latin America, Spain, Portugal, or the United States in 2021.

=== First quarter ===
==== January ====
Day	Title	Artist	Genre(s)	Singles	Label
1	Cor	Anavitória	Folk-pop		Anavitória Artes
8	Monarca	Eladio Carrión	Urbano	Rimas Entertainment	
8	Pa' Que Se Esmigajen los Parlantes	Carlos Rueda and Diego Daza		ONErpm	
8	El Arte Del Bolero	Luis Perdomo and Miguel Zenón	Latin jazz	Miel Music	
11	MicroSinfonías	Sergio Vallín	Rock		Universal
14	K.O.	Danna Paola	Pop	"Contigo" "Sola" "TQ Y YA" "No Bailes Sola" "Me, Myself" "Friend de Semana"	Universal
15	Drugrats	Yung Beef	Trap	"A La Cara"	La Vendición
15	Roku Roku	Rojuu	Grunge	"Si Te Vuelvo a Ver"	Independent
22	Los Dioses	Anuel AA, Ozuna	Reggaeton	"Los Dioses"	Sony
22	No Puede Ser Peor	Venturi	Rock	"Pastillas Para Soñar"	Oso Polita
22	Madre	Arca	IDM	"Madre"	XL
22	Parques Nacionales Españoles	Alexanderplatz	Indie rock	"Murcia Delenda Est"	Independent
22	Duda Beat & Nando Reis	Duda Beat and Nando Reis	Pop		Relicário
22	La Esencia	Jory Boy	Reggaeton		BMG Rights Management
29	7 Días En Jamaica	Maluma	Reggaeton		Sony
29	Distrito Federal	Instituto Mexicano del Sonido	Alternative	"Dios"	Universal
29	Cuando Te Enamores	El Bebeto	Mariachi		Universal Music Latin Entertainment
29	Back on Track	Ram Herrera	Tejano		Ram Music
29	Vocal	Alejandro Zavala	Instrumental		Alejandro Zavala

==== February ====
Day	Title	Artist	Genre(s)	Singles	Label
5	Angelus Apatrida	Angelus Apatrida	Thrash metal	"Indoctrinate"	Century Media
5	La Orilla	Conchita	Singer-songwriter	"Un Camino Para Volver"	Universal
5	Los Legendarios 001	Wisin	Reggaeton	"Fiel"	La Base
5	Vamos Bien	Calibre 50	Norteño		AndaLuz Music
5	Samba de Verão	Diogo Nogueira	Samba		Altafonte
5	Primer Dia de Clases	Mora			
7	Déja Vu	CNCO	Latin pop	"Tan Enamorados"	Sony
11	Mira Lo Que Me Hiciste Hacer	Diamante Eléctrico	Pop rock		Independiente
12	$ad Boyz 4 Life	Junior H			
19	Aire	Judit Neddermann	Folk	"Marea Blanca"	Global
19	Parc	Ferran Palau	Folk-pop	"Reflexe"	Hidden Track
19	Errantes Telúricos	Los Hermanos Cubero	Indie folk	—	Primavera
19	Proyecto Toribio	Los Hermanos Cubero	Indie folk	—	Primavera
19	Tinto Tango plays Piazzolla	Tinto Tango	Tango		Avantango
19	Nucleo	vf7	Reggaeton	"No Te Quiero Ver (Remix)"	Sora and Company
Proyecto Toribio	—				
26	El Madrileño	C. Tangana	Progressive folk	"Demasiadas Mujeres" "Tú Me Dejaste de Querer" "Comerte Entera"	Sony
26	La Buena Suerte	Shinova	Alternative rock	"La Sonrisa Intacta"	Warner
26	Vivir la Vida	Banda Los Recoditos	Banda		Universal Music Latin Entertainment

==== March ====
Day	Title	Artist	Genre(s)	Singles	Label
4	Mis Manos	Camilo	Latin pop		Sony Music Latin
5	La Sangre del Mundo	Muerdo	World	"Yo Pisaré las Calles Nuevamente"	Warner
5	Otero y Yo	David Otero	Pop rock	"Una Foto en Blanco Y Negro"	Universal
5	100 Años	Quinteto Revolucionario	Tango		Club Del Disco
5	Retumban2	Ovi			
7	Alma Cubana	Leoni Torres	Tropical		Puntilla Music
12	Carrer	Ebri Knight	Punk rock	"La Pacha"	Maldito
12	Crema	Tu Otra Bonita	Indie pop	"La Verdad"	Warner
12	Nieve	Aron	Urbano	"Sigo"	Independent
12	Revelación	Selena Gomez	Pop	"De Una Vez" "Baila Conmigo"	Interscope
12	Isqun	Renata Flores			
18	Sueños de Dalí	Paloma Mami	Latin R&B	"Goteo"	Sony
19	Claves Líricas	Teo Cardalda	Folk	—	—
19	Homónimo	Rayden	Rap	"Solo Los Amantes Sobreviven"	Universal
19	Warm Up	Bad Gyal	Dancehall	"Blin Blin"	Interscope
19	Río Abajo	Diana Burco	Tropical		Somos
19	Acertijos	Pedrito Martínez	Tropical		Eshuni Entertainment
26	Corazón Cromado	Sen Senra	Bedroom pop	"Euforia"	Universal
26	KG0516	Karol G	Reggaeton	"Ay, Dios Mío!" "Bichota"	Universal
26	La Pequeña Semilla	Alba Reche	Synth-pop	"Que Bailen"	Universal
26	Llepolies	ZOO	Ska	"Avant"	ZOO
26	Pa' La Pista y Pa'l Pisto, Vol. 2	El Plan	Tejano		Indepe Music
26	Volando Alto	Palomo	Tejano		Segura Music
26	Catarse: Lado B	Daniela Araújo	Latin Christian		ONErpm
26	Daniel em Casa	Daniel	Sertanejo		Daniel Promções Artísticas
29	Tango of the Americas	Pan American Symphony Orchestra	Tango		Independent

=== Second quarter ===
==== April ====
Day	Title	Artist	Genre(s)	Singles	Label
1	Voyager	Iván Melon Lewis	Latin jazz		Cezanne Producciones
1	Sambadeiras	Luiz Caldas	Folk		ONErpm
8	SEIS	Mon Laferte	Folk	"Que Se Sepa Nuestro Amor" "Se Me Va a Quemar el Corazon" "La Mujer"	Universal
9	Al Día Siguiente	Anne Lukin	Pop	"Quien Eres"	Sweet Bird
9	En Cuarentena	El Gran Combo de Puerto Rico	Salsa	"El Combo del Mundo"	Rimas Entertainment
9	Dopamina	Manuel Turizo	Reggaeton	"Mala Costumbre"	Sony Latin
9	Tour Balas Perdidas en Madrid	Morat	Live	—	Universal
9	Ontology	Roxana Amed	Latin jazz	—	Sony Music Latin
9	Virtual Birdland	Arturo O'Farrill and the Afro Latin Jazz Orchestra	Latin jazz		
15	42	Sech			
15	SALSWING!	Rubén Blades and Roberto Delgado & Orquesta	Salsa, Jazz, Swing		Rubén Blades Productions
16	Sonidos de Karmática Resonancia	Zoé	Rock	"SKR"	Capitol
16	V.E.H.N.	Love of Lesbian	Pop rock	"Cosmos"	Warner Music Spain
16	Veinte Años y Un Destino	David Bustamante	Pop	"Dos Hombres y Un Destino"	Universal
16	#Charramillennial - Lady	Nora González	Mariachi		CHR
21	El Rey	María Toledo	Flamenco		CHR
22	Herencia	Rafael Riqueni	Flamenco		[Universal Music Spain
23	Corazonada	Veintiuno	Indie pop	"Haters"	Muchacho
23	Hilo Negro	Derby Motoreta's Burrito Kachimba	Rock	"Gitana"	Universal
23	Seremos	Ismael Serrano	Singer-songwriter	"Porque Fuimos"	Universal
23	Te Lo Digo To y No Te Digo Na	Rosario	Rumba	"La Vida es Otra Cosa"	Universal
23	Lyke Myke	Myke Towers	Urbano		One World International
23	Mis Grandes Éxitos	Adan Jodorowsky and The French Kiss	Pop rock		Universal Music Mexico
23	SALSA PLUS!	Rubén Blades and Roberto Delgado & Orquesta	Salsa		Rubén Blades Productions
23	Sin Miedo Al Éxito	Banda Los Sebastianes	Banda		Universal Music Latin Entertainment
23	Le Petit Garage (Live)	Ara Malikian	Instrumental		Picos & Ham
23	OXEAXEEXU	BaianaSystem	Brazilian rock		Máquina De Louco
28	Gente con Alma	José Aguirre Cali Big Band	Contemporary Tropical		Jose Aguirre Productions
29	El Día Es Hoy	Willy Garcia	Salsa		L Y L Producciones
30	Eduardo	Ed Maverick	Folk		Universal
30	Hombres de Fuego	Javier Limón	Spanish rock	"Voces Masculinas"	Casa Limón
30	PUTA	Zahara	Indie pop	"Merichane"	Gozz Records
30	Noche de Serenata	Geño Gamez and Osmar Pérez			Mano De Obra
30	Llegando Al Rancho	Joss Favela	Banda		Sony Music Latin
30	Milagro de Amar	William Perdomo	Latin Christian		WP Music

==== May ====
Day	Title	Artist	Genre(s)	Singles	Label	
5	Doce Magaritas	Nella	Traditional pop		Sony Music Latin	
5	Tres Historias Concertantes	Héctor Infanzón	Classical		Indel	
6	Es Merengue ¿Algún Problema?	Sergio Vargas	Merengue		J&N	
7	Luz	No Te Va Gustar	Rock en español		Elefante Blanco	
11	Tropiplop	Aterciopelados	Latin alternative		Entre Casa Colombia	
11	Seguir Teu Coração	Anderson Freire	Latin Christian		Mk Music	
14	Sinapsis	Chica Sobresalto	Indie pop	"Fusión del Núcleo" "Adrenalina" "Selección Natural"	El Dromedario Records	
14	El Viaje	Pedro Guerra				
18	Vera Cruz	Edu Falaschi	Power metal		MS Metal Records	
19	tdbn	Bratty	Indie rock	"tdbn" "tarde" "tuviste" "lejos"	Universal	
20	Mañana Te Escribo Otra Canción	Covi Quintana	Singer-songwriter		Warner Music Spain	
21	Lazos y Nudos	Abhir Hathi	Trap	"Reflejos" "Perros" "Rodeos" "A Medias Verdades"		
21	Mendó	Alex Cuba	Rock			
21	El Sueño de un Niño	El Prefe	Trap			
21	Pa’ Que Te Duela	JFab & Paola Fabre	Bachata			
21	La Batalla	Juan Ingaramo	Urban-pop	"Casamiento"		
21	Juan Pablo Vega	Juan Pablo Vega	R&B	"Prófugos", "Matando"		
21	45RPM	Leonel Garcia	R&B			
21	Recordando a una Leyenda	Los Plebes del Rancho de Ariel Camacho & Christian Nodal				
21	El Niño	Lunay				
21	in	Marrón				
21	En Español Edición Deluxe	The Mavericks				
21	El Pozo Brillante	Vicentico	Rock en español		Sony Music Argentina	
21	Chabuco en la Habana	Chabuco	Traditional tropical		Marmaz	
21	Cha Cha Chá: Homenaje a lo Tradicional	Alain Pérez, Issac Delgado, and Orquesta Aragón	Traditional tropical		Marmaz	
21	Recordando A Una Leyenda	Christian Nodal and Los Plebes del Rancho de Ariel Camacho	Norteño		Universal Music Latin Entertainment	
21	Bachianinha: Toquinho e Yamandu Costa (Live at Rio Montreux Jazz Festival)	Toquinho and Yamandu Costa	Instrumental			
21	H.O.J.E	Delia Fischer	MPB		Labidad Music	
21	Family	Edmar Castañeda	Latin jazz		Arpa y Voz	
21	Caleidoscópico	Maneva	Reggae		Universal Music	
25	Amor y Punto	Manolo Ramos				
26	Soy México	Pike Romero	Mariachi			
26	Tragas o Escupes	Jarabe de Palo			Tronco	
27	KRACK	Lenny Tavárez	Reggaeton			
27	Chegamos Sozinhos em Casa, Vol. 1	Tuyo	Pop		Tuyo	
28	Dios Los Cria	Andres Calamaro	Latin pop		Universal Music Argentina	
28	Leyendas	Carlos Rivera				
28	Mandarina	Gian Marco	Latin Pop, Ballad, Latin Rock	"Empezar De Nuevo", "Prefiero Vivir Sin Tí", "No Va A Ser Facil", "En Tu Maleta", "Mandarina", "Pasa"	Enjoymusic	
28	Origen	Juanes				
28	Canciones del Alma	Luis Figueroa				
28	Un canto por México Vol. 2	Natalia Lafourcade				
28	Corridos Tumbados Vol. 3	Natanael Cano				
28	Pureza	Queralt Lahoz				
28	Mis Amores	Paula Arenas	Pop		Do Re Millions	
28	Atlántico a Pie	Diego Torres	Pop		Sony Music Latin	
28	Control	Caramelos de Cianuro	Rock		InnerCat Music Group	
28	Esencia	Felipe Peláez	Vallenato		Arte Producciones	
28	Bachata Queen	Alexandra	Bachata		J&N	
28	Insensatez	Fernando Villalona	Merengue		La Oreja Media	
28	Solos	Jon Secada and Gonzalo Rubalcaba	Traditional tropical		Oleta Music	
28	La Música del Carnaval – XX Aniversario	Juventino Ojito y Su Son Mocaná	tropical		Cuarto Verde Music	
28	Concierto Mundial Digital Live	Banda El Recodo	Banda		Universal Music Latin Entertainment	
28	Histórico	La Fiebre	Tejano		Martzcom Music	
28	Danilo & Chapis, Vol. 1	Danilo & Chapis	Children		Moon Moosic	
28	BPM	Salvador Sobral			Warner Music Spain,	
28	Sin Salsa No Hay Paraíso	Aymée Nuviola	Salsa			
28	Ancestras	Petrona Martinez			Chaco World Music	
28	30	Alemorología	AleMor	Singer=songwriter		Wizzmor
28	30	Ya Me Vi	Aroddy	Latin Christian		Del Corazón De Aroddy
A Mis 20	Natanael Cano					
31	CABRA	Cabra	Latin alternative		La Casa Del Sombrero	
31	Cuando los Acefalos Predominan	Rawayana				
31	Love Dance Merengue	Manny Cruz	Merengue		La Oreja Media Group	
31	Incomparable	Solido	Tejano		Indepe Music	
31	Jemas	Tato Marenco	Instrumental		[Sway Music	
Tanghetto Plays Piazzolla	Tanghetto	Tango		Constitution Music		

==== June ====
Day	Title	Artist	Genre(s)	Singles	Label
8	Será Que Se Acabó	Alexander Abreu and Havana D'Primera			Páfata & Unicornio
8	Remelexo Bom	Luiz Caldas			ONErpm
18	Entre Mar y Palmeras	Juan Luis Guerra	Merengue, bachata	"Rosalía" (Live)	RIMAS
25	Tu Veneno Mortal, Vol. 2	Eslabón Armado			
25	Será Que Ahora Podremos Entendernos	Mabe Fratti			
25	Barrio Canino (Pt. 1)	Alexis y Fido	Reggaeton	"Te Reto"	UMLE

=== Third quarter ===
==== July ====
Day	Title	Artist	Genre(s)	Singles	Label
1	20+ Piano Improvisations	Antiguo Autómata Mexicano			Static Discos
1	Horacio Salgán Piano Transcriptions	Pablo Estigarribia	Tango		Independiente
1	Portas	Marisa Monte	Música popular brasileira		Sony Music Brasil
2	Sen2 Kbrn, Vol. 1	Eladio Carrión			
2	Flor y Raíz	Pedro Aznar	Folk		Belgrano Norte
2	Expectativa x Realidade	Matheus & Kauan	Sertanejo		Universal Music
6	Ranchera Flamenca	Flavio		"Yo con Yo Mismo" "Ya" "Dejarse Llevar" "Sobran las palabras" "Los de arriba"	Sony Spain
9	Flavio	Flavio		"Yo con Yo Mismo" "Ya" "Dejarse Llevar" "Sobran las palabras" "Los de arriba"	Sony Spain
9	Magia	Álvaro Soler	Pop	"Magia"	Airforce 1
9	Villa-Lobos: Complete Violin Sonatas	Emmanuele Baldini Pablo Ross	Classical		Naxos
16	Drama	Rodrigo Amarante	Multiple		Polyvinyl Record Co.
18	Doce 22	Luísa Sonza	Pop	"Anaconda" (feat. Mariah Angeliq)	Universal Music Brazil
23	El Playlist de Anoche	Tommy Torres	Pop		Rimas
23	Hecho a la Antigua	Ricardo Arjona	Latin pop		
23	Reggaeton De La Mata	Urba y Rome	Reggaeton		Rimas Entertainment
28	Palabras Urgentes	Susana Baca	Folk		Pregón Produccione
29	Erika Ribeiro - Ígor Stravinsky, Sofia Gubaidúlina e Hermeto Pascoal	Erika Ribeiro	Classical		OnMusic Recordings
30	Alma Vieja	Los Tangueros del Oeste	Tango		Avantango
30	ANTES DA TERAPIA	Asaph	Latin Christian		Sony Music Brasil
31	Jobim Forever	Antonio Adolfo	Latin jazz		AAM Music

==== August ====
Day	Title	Artist	Genre(s)	Singles	Label
1	Alma Vacía	Ivan Cornejo			
10	Agropoc	Gabeu	Sertanejo		Independente
13	Ofrenda	Grupo Raíces de Venezuela			
19	La Última Promesa	Justin Quiles			
19	De Primeira	Marina Sena	Pop		Marina Sena
20	Inter Shibuya – La Mafia	Feid	Reggaeton		Universal Music Latino
26	The South Bronx Story	Carlos Henriquez	Latin jazz		
27	Animal	María Becerra	R&B, reggaeton, Latin trap, Latin pop	Animal, Acaramelao, Cazame, Mi Debilidad, Wow Wow, No Eres Tú Soy Yo	Big One, Súbelo, NEOTatoo
31	Epifania	Clovis Pinho	Latin Christian		Som Livre

==== September ====
Day	Title	Artist	Genre(s)	Singles	Label
2	Jose	J Balvin	Reggaeton	"Otra Noche sin Ti" "7 de Mayo" "Qué Más Pues?" "Otro Fili" "In da Getto" "Que Locura"	
9	Indigo Borboleta Anil	Liniker	Música popular brasileira		Altafonte
10	Deja	Bomba Estéreo	Cumbia	"Agua"	Rough Trade
10	Mirror Mirror	Eliane Elias	Jazz		Candid
17	Final (Vol. 1)	Enrique Iglesias			
17	Los Favoritos 2.5	Arcángel	Urbano		Rimas
17	Estas Se Acompañan Con Cerveza	Pesado	Norteño		Pesado
17	Quédate en Casa	Eva Ayllón	Folk		Sway Music
21	Malvadisco	Caloncho			Universal Music México
21	Orgánica	Carmen Doorá	Flamenco		Borderline Music
22	Feira Livre	Bananeira Brass Band			Dorsal Musik
24	La Luz del Martes	Ana Guerra	Pop	"Tik Tak"	Universal Spain
24	Nattividad	Natti Natasha			Pina
24	Cada vez cadáver	Fito & Fitipaldis	Rock en español		Warner Music Spain
24	Mexicana Enamorada	Ángela Aguilar	Mariachi		Machin
24	Esta Vida Es Muy Bonita	Banda el Recodo	Banda		Fonovisa
24	Viviré	Marcos Witt	Latin Christian		CanZion
27	És Tudo	Bruna Karla	Latin Christian		MK Music
30	Qué Ganas De Verte	Marco Antonio Solís	Mariachi		Marbella Music
30	Gerry Weil Sinfónico	Gerry Weil & Simón Bolívar Symphony Orchestra			Go & Flow Project
30	El Cante	Kiki Morente			Universal Music Spain
30	Delta Estácio Blues	Juçara Marçal	Brazilian rock		QTV

=== Fourth quarter ===
==== October ====
Day	Title	Artist	Genre(s)	Singles	Label
1	La 167	Farruko			
8	Laboratório Do Groove	Eli Soares	Latin Christian		Universal Music
8	El Alimento	Cimafunk	Latin alternative		
14	Festa Das Patroas 35% (Patroas 35%)	Marília Mendonça, Maiara & Maraísa	Sertanejo		Som Livre
15	Imaculada	Alice Caymmi	Pop, alternative pop	"Serpente"	Rainha dos Raios / Brabo Music
15	Blessings and Miracles	Santana	Latin rock, jazz, blues, reggae	"Move", "She's Fire", "Whiter Shade of Pale", "Joy", "Ghost of Future Pull / New Light"	BMG Rights Management
19	Pirata	Jão	Pop		Universal Music
21	Casa Francisco	Francisco, el Hombre	Latin music, MPB, rock	"Nada Conterá a Primavera", "Olha a Chuva", "Se Não Fosse Por Ontem"	ONErpm
21	Meu Coco	Caetano Veloso	MPB		Caetano Veloso
22	Quiero Verte Feliz	La Santa Cecilia	Cumbia		Rebeleon Entertainment
22	Mi Herencia, Mi Sangre	Majo Aguilar	Mariachi		Fonovisa
22	Síntese do Lance	João Donato and Jards Macalé	Música popular brasileira		Rocinante
25	Vice Versa	Rauw Alejandro		"2/Catorce" "Todo de Ti" "Sexo Virtual" "Desenfocao'" "Nubes" "Cúrame" "Desesperados"	Sony Music Latin
28	Nu Com a Minha Música	Ney Matogrosso			Sony Music Brasil
29	Bons Ventos	Nego Alvaro	Samba		Sony Music Brasil
29	Pomares	Chico Chico	Música popular brasileira		Selim De Música
29	1940 Carmen	Mon Laferte	Latin alternative	Algo es Mejor	Universal Music México

==== November ====
Day	Title	Artist	Genre(s)	Singles	Label
4	Caco de Vidro	Duda Brack	Pop, cumbia, folk, funk, pagode, rock	"Toma Essa", "Ouro Lata"	Matogrosso/Alá Comunicação e Cultura/Altafonte
5	Belo Chico	Nilton Freittas, Roberto Malvezzi, and Targino Gondim	Folk		ONErpm
9	Senhora Estrada	Alceu Valença	Folk		Clix
10	El Disko	CA7RIEL	Latin alternative		Clix
12	La Clase	Grupo Los de la O	Regional Mexican		Manzana
12	La Vida	Kurt	Latin pop		Universal Music México
12	La Dirección	Conociendo Rusia	Pop rock		Geiser Discos
12	Un Canto Por México: El Musical	Natalia Lafourcade	Folk		Sony Music Entertainment México
12	Gracinha	Manu Gavassi	Pop	Universal Music Brasil	
19	Tañón Pal' Combo Es Lo Que Hay	Olga Tañón	Merengue		Opcion 1 Entertainment
19	Legendario	Tito Nieves	Salsa		
19	Err Bambini	Brray	Reggaeton, Trap		UMLE
21	Los Años Salvajes	Fito Páez	Pop rock		Sony Music Argentina
22	Los Años Salvajes	Fito Páez	Pop rock		Sony Music Argentina
24	Multitudes	Elvis Crespo	Merengue		Flash Music
25	Cable a Tierra	Vetusta Morla	Pop rock		Sony Music España
26	Las Leyendas Nunca Mueren	Anuel AA	Urbano		Real Hasta la Muerte
26	Memórias (De Onde eu Nunca Fui)	Lagum	Brazilian rock		Sony Music
26	Koati Original Soundtrack	Various artists			
30	Kick II	Arca	Latin alternative		XL Recordings
30	Afrocanto das Nações	Mateus Aleluia	Folk		Sanzala Cultural

==== December ====
Day	Title	Artist	Genre(s)	Singles	Label
2	Sauce Boyz 2	Eladio Carrión	Urbano		Rimas
2	Leo	Estrella Morente	Flamenco		Concert Music Entertainment
3	Maxixe Samba Groove	Hamilton de Holanda			Brasilianos
3	Cuando Te Muerdes el Labio	Leiva			Sony Music España
8	Alfa y Omega	Athenas	Latin Christian		Athenas
9	Céu Lilás	Péricles	Samba		ONErpm
10	RPDF	Whiplash	Rock en español		Virgin Music Mexico
10	Tango de Nuevos Ayres	Mariana Quinteros	Tango		Acqua
15	Live in Peru	Tony Succar	Salsa		
17	Desde la Raíz	Los Lara			
17	Na Estrada (Ao Vivo)	Banda Pau e Corda Featuring Quinteto Violado	Folk		Biscoito Fino]
24	LPM (La Perreo Mixtape)	Yng Lvcas	Regional Mexican		Rimas
31	Del Barrio Hasta Aquí, Vol. 2	Fuerza Regida	Regional Mexican		Rimas

== Year-End ==
=== Performance in the United States ===
==== Albums ====
The following is a list of the 10 best-performing Latin albums in the United States according to Billboard and Nielsen SoundScan, which compiles data from traditional sales and album-equivalent units. Equivalent album units are based on album sales, track equivalent albums (10 tracks sold equals one album sale), and streaming equivalent albums (3,750 ad-supported streams or 1,250 paid subscription streams equals one album sale).

Rank	Album	Artist
1	El Último Tour Del Mundo	Bad Bunny
2	YHLQMDLG	Bad Bunny
3	X 100pre	Bad Bunny
4	Ones	Selena
5	Sin Miedo (del Amor y Otros Demonios)	Kali Uchis
6	KG0516	Karol G
7	Afrodisíaco	Rauw Alejandro
8	Papi Juancho	Maluma
9	Emmanuel	Anuel AA
10	Las que no iban a salir	Bad Bunny

==== Songs ====
The following is a list of the 10 best-performing Latin songs in the United States according to Billboard and Nielsen SoundScan, which compiles data from streaming activity, digital sales and radio airplay.

Rank	Single	Artist
1	"Dakiti"	Bad Bunny and Jhay Cortez
2	"Telepatía"	Kali Uchis
3	"Hawái"	Maluma and The Weeknd
4	"La Noche de Anoche"	Bad Bunny and Rosalía
5	"Yonaguni"	Bad Bunny
6	"Todo de Ti"	Rauw Alejandro
7	"Pepas"	Farruko
8	"Bichota"	Karol G
9	"Fiel"	Los Legendarios, Wisin & Jhay Cortez
10	"Bandido"	Myke Towers and Juhn

=== Airplay in Latin America ===
The following is a list of the 10 most-played radio songs in Latin America in the tracking period of January 1, 2021, through November 28, 2021, according to Monitor Latino.

Rank	Single	Artist	Spins
1	Todo de Ti	Rauw Alejandro	321,990
2	Hawai	Maluma and The Weeknd	266,810
3	Bandido	Myke Towers and Juhn	244,200
4	Dakiti	Bad Bunny and Jhay Cortez	241,710
5	Pareja del Año	Sebastian Yatra and Myke Towers	241,190
6	Bichota	Karol G	216,640
7	Fiel	Wisin and Jhay Cortez	210,580
8	911	Sech	207,460
9	Vida de Rico	Camilo	203,100
10	Botella Tras Botella	Gera MX and Christian Nodal	199,920

The following is a list of the 10 most-heard radio songs in Latin America in the tracking period of January 1, 2021, through November 28, 2021, according to Monitor Latino.

Rank	Single	Artist	Audience
1	Todo de Ti	Rauw Alejandro	2.01B
2	Bandido	Myke Towers and Juhn	1.71B
3	Dakiti	Bad Bunny and Jhay Cortez	1.57B
4	Botella Tras Botella	Gera MX and Christian Nodal	1.53B
5	Pareja del Año	Sebastian Yatra and Myke Towers	1.50B
6	Sobrio	Maluma	1.40B
7	Hawai	Maluma and The Weeknd	1.39B
8	911	Sech	1.37B
9	Canción Bonita	Carlos Vives and Ricky Martin	1.29B
10	AM	Nio Garcia	1.27B

== Deaths ==
- January 1 – Carlos do Carmo, Portuguese fado singer and recipient of the Latin Grammy Lifetime Achievement Award in 2014, 81
- January 5 – Raúl Jaurena, 79, Uruguayan tango composer and bandoneon player
- January 7 – Genival Lacerda, Brazilian forró singer-songwriter, 89
- January 9 – Carlos Pérez-Bidó Puerto Rican percussionist
- January 13 – Alex Malverde, Mexican hip hop producer-
- January 16 – Claudia Montero, 58, Argentine classical composer, Latin Grammy winner (2014, 2016, 2018), cancer.
- January 28 – César Isella, Argentine singer-songwriter, 82
- February 4 – Jaime Murrell, 71, Panamanian Christian singer and songwriter, COVID-19.
- February 5:
  - Jaime Murrell, Panamanian singer, 71
  - Mario Kaminsky, 87, Argentine record label executive
- February 9 – Chick Corea, 79, American jazz keyboardist (Return to Forever) and songwriter ("Spain", "500 Miles High"), 23-time Grammy winner, cancer.
- February 15 – Johnny Pacheco, 85, Dominican-American musician (Fania All-Stars) and label executive (Fania Records), complications from pneumonia.
- February 27 – Gipsy Bonafina, Argentine actress and singer, 63
- February 28 – Jorge Oñate, Colombian vallenato singer, 71 (COVID-19)
- March 8 – Cepillín, 75, Mexican clown, singer, TV host and actor, complications from spinal surgery.
- March 9 – Federico Fabregat, 46, Mexican visual artist, writer and musician.
- March 11 – Florentín Giménez, Paraguayan pianist and composer, 95
- March 15 – Oscar Guitián, 52,
- March 17 – Horacio Valdés, Panamanian singer, songwriter, actor, and guitarist
- March 30 – Salvador Lizárraga, 88, founder of La Original Banda El Limón
- April 3:
  - Agnaldo Timóteo, Brazilian singer, composer and politician, 84 (COVID-19)
  - Viti Paz, 89, Panamanian trumpet player
- April 5 – Henry Stephen, 79, Venezuelan singer, complications from COVID-19.
- April 19 – Dedim Gouveia, Brazilian forró singer, 61 (COVID-19)
- April 24 – Sergio Esquivel, 74, Mexican singer-songwriter.
- April 30 – Ray Reyes, 51, Puerto Rican singer (Menudo, El Reencuentro), heart attack.
- May 7 – Cassiano, Brazilian singer and composer, 77 (COVID-19)
- May 17 – MC Kevin, Brazilian singer, 23
- May 21 – Roberto González, 68, Mexican singer, songwriter
- July 3 – Rudy Rodríguez, American saxophonist
- July 4 – José Manuel Zamacona, Mexican singer and musician
- July 22 – Palo Pandolfo, 56, Argentine singer-songwriter and musician (Don Cornelio y la Zona).
- July 28 – Johnny Ventura, 81, Dominican merengue and salsa musician, mayor of Santo Domingo (1998–2002) and deputy (1982–1986), heart attack.
- August 20 – Larry Harlow, 82, American salsa musician and composer, kidney disease.
- September 14 – Vicente Zarzo Pitarch, 83, Spanish horn player and writer.
- September 19 – José Alfredo Jiménez Jr., 63, Mexican singer and songwriter, son of José Alfredo Jiménez,
- September 21
  - La Prieta Linda (Enriqueta "Queta" Jiménez Chabolla), Mexican singer and actress, 88
  - Roberto Roena, Puerto Rican salsa percussionist and bandleader, 81
- September 25 – Patricio Manns, 84, Chilean singer, composer ("Arriba en la Cordillera") and writer, heart failure.
- October 10 – Luis de Pablo, 91, Spanish composer (Generación del 51).
- October 18 – Concha Márquez Piquer, 75, Argentine-Spanish singer and actor
- October 23:
  - Alfredo Diez Nieto, 102, Cuban composer and conductor.
  - Mauricio Garza, 26, Mexican singer
- October 27 – Letieres Leit, 61, musician, arranger, composer
- October 28 – Jorge Cumbo, 78, Argentine quena player (Los Incas), cancer.
- November 1
  - Nelson Freire, Brazilian classical pianist, 77
  - Gilberto Grácio, Portuguese guitar maker, 85
- November 1 – Nelson Freire, 77, Brazilian classical pianist.
- November 4 – Mario Lavista, 78, Mexican composer and writer.
- November 5 – Marília Mendonça, Brazilian singer and Grammy winner (2019), 26 (air crash)
- December 6 – Hector Emaides, Argentinian music and festival producer (Cosquin Rock), 66 (pneumonia)
- December 11 – Monarco, Brazilian sambista (Portela), 88
- December 12 – Vicente Fernández, Mexican singer and actor, multiple Grammy Award winner, 81
- December 15 – Flow La Movie, 36, Puerto Rican music producer (Ozuna, Bad Bunny), plane crash.
- December 19 – Carlos Marín, 53, German-born Spanish singer (Il Divo), COVID-19.
- December 24 – Oscar López Ruiz, 83, Argentine composer, record producer and guitarist.
