= Venturia =

Venturia may refer to:

- Venturia (band), a progressive-metal band from Montpellier, France
- Venturia (comics), an outpost of Atlantis in the DC Universe
- Venturia (fungus), a genus of fungi including Venturia inaequalis
- Venturia (wasp), a genus of ichneumon wasps
- Venturia, North Dakota, a small American city

== See also ==
- Veturia or Volumnia, Roman matron, mother of general Gaius Marcius Coriolanus
