= É (album) =

Studio album by Duda Brack
- Released: April 7, 2015
- Genre: Alternative rock
- Length: 30:13
- Language: Portuguese
- Producer: Bruno Giorgi

Duda Brack chronology
É (2015)	Caco de Vidro (2021)

É is the debut album by Brazilian singer Duda Brack, released independently on 7 April 2015. It was produced by Bruno Giorgi, Lenine's son.

According to Brack, she researched references for the album cover art and, two months before its release, she found a picture taken by Flora Borsi from Hungary, who told her that particular photograph had already been sold to Adobe Photoshop, but that she could use pictures from another collection, and one of them ended up becoming the final cover.

== Critical reception ==
Professional ratings
Review scores
Source	Rating
Notas Musicais	5/5 stars
Folha de S.Paulo	3/5 stars

Writing for his blog Notas Musicais, Mauro Ferreira gave the album 5 stars, and called Brack "capricious", "aggressive", "incendiary" and "maddened", pointing out that she "debuted in an insane market with a suicidal album, commercial-wise".

Thales de Menezes, at Folha de S.Paulo, gave the album 3 out of 5 stars. He praised her voice and her performance, but noticed some hoarseness on her voice that would be typical of older singers.

== Track listing ==
No.	Title	Writer(s)	Length
1.	"Eu Sou o Ar" (I am the Air)	César Lacerda	3:06
2.	"Vaza" (Beat It)	Taís Feijão	3:21
3.	"Lata de Tinta" (Ink Can)	Paulo Monarco, Elio Camalle	3:26
4.	"Dez Dias" (Ten Days)	Dani Black	3:54
5.	"Venha" (Come)	Paulo Monarco, Celso Viáfora	3:58
6.	"Te Ver Chegar" (To See You Arrive)	Paulo Novaes	2:51
7.	"Cadafalso" (Scaffold)	Carlos Posada	5:42
8.	"A Casa Não Cairá" (The House Will Not Fall)	Caio Prado	3:55
Total length:			30:13
