= List of number-one singles of 2021 (Spain) =

This lists the singles that reached number one on the Spanish PROMUSICAE sales and airplay charts in 2021. Total sales correspond to the data sent by regular contributors to sales volumes and by digital distributors.

== Chart history ==
Week	Issue date	Top Streaming, Downloads & Physical Sales			Most Airplay		
Week	Issue date	Artist(s)	Song	Ref.	Artist(s)	Song	Ref.
1	January 1	Bad Bunny and Jhay Cortez	"Dakiti"		BTS	"Dynamite"	
2	January 8	Bad Bunny and Jhay Cortez	"Dakiti"		Nil Moliner	"Mi Religión"	
3	January 15	Myke Towers and Juhn	"Bandido"		Dani Martín	"Portales"	
4	January 22	Myke Towers and Juhn	"Bandido"		Ana Mena and Rocco Hunt	"A un paso de la luna"	
5	January 29	Myke Towers and Juhn	"Bandido"		Nil Moliner	"Mi Religión"	
6	February 5	Myke Towers and Juhn	"Bandido"		Nil Moliner	"Mi Religión"	
7	February 12	Rochy RD, Myke Towers and Nicki Nicole	"Ella No Es Tuya"		Camilo	"Vida De Rico"	
8	February 19	Rochy RD, Myke Towers and Nicki Nicole	"Ella No Es Tuya"		Nil Moliner	"Mi Religión"	
9	February 26	C. Tangana featuring Gipsy Kings	"Ingobernable"		Ana Mena and Rocco Hunt	"A un paso de la luna"	
10	March 5	Rochy RD, Myke Towers and Nicki Nicole	"Ella No es Tuya"		Camilo	"Vida De Rico"	
11	March 12	Rochy RD, Myke Towers and Nicki Nicole	"Ella No es Tuya"		Purple Disco Machine and Sophie and the Giants	"Hypnotized"	
12	March 19	Rochy RD, Myke Towers and Nicki Nicole	"Ella No es Tuya"		Purple Disco Machine and Sophie and the Giants	"Hypnotized"	
13	March 26	Rochy RD, Myke Towers and Nicki Nicole	"Ella No es Tuya"		Álvaro de Luna	"Juramento eterno de sal"	
14	April 2	Los Legendarios, Wisin and Jhay Cortez	"Fiel"		Beret and Melendi	"Desde Cero"	
15	April 9	Los Legendarios, Wisin and Jhay Cortez	"Fiel"		Purple Disco Machine and Sophie and the Giants	"Hypnotized"	
16	April 16	Los Legendarios, Wisin and Jhay Cortez	"Fiel"		Álvaro de Luna	"Juramento eterno de sal"	
17	April 23	Sebastián Yatra featuring Myke Towers	"Pareja del Año"		Purple Disco Machine and Sophie and the Giants	"Hypnotized"	
18	April 30	Sebastián Yatra featuring Myke Towers	"Pareja del Año"		Álvaro de Luna	"Juramento eterno de sal"	
19	May 7	Sebastián Yatra featuring Myke Towers	"Pareja del Año"		Álvaro de Luna	"Juramento eterno de sal"	
20	May 14	Sebastián Yatra featuring Myke Towers	"Pareja del Año"		Álvaro de Luna	"Juramento eterno de sal"	
21	May 21	Rauw Alejandro	"Todo de Ti"		Álvaro de Luna	"Juramento eterno de sal"	
22	May 28	Rauw Alejandro	"Todo de Ti"		Álvaro de Luna	"Juramento eterno de sal"	
23	June 5	Rauw Alejandro	"Todo de Ti"		Álvaro de Luna	"Juramento eterno de sal"	
24	June 12	Rauw Alejandro	"Todo de Ti"		Álvaro de Luna	"Juramento eterno de sal"	
25	June 19	Rauw Alejandro	"Todo de Ti"		Álvaro de Luna	"Juramento eterno de sal"	
26	June 26	Rauw Alejandro	"Todo de Ti"		Purple Disco Machine and Sophie and the Giants	"Hypnotized"	
27	July 3	Rauw Alejandro	"Todo de Ti"		Rauw Alejandro	"Todo de Ti"	
28	July 10	Rauw Alejandro	"Todo de Ti"		Álvaro de Luna	"Juramento eterno de sal"	
29	July 17	Rauw Alejandro	"Todo de Ti"		Álvaro de Luna	"Juramento eterno de sal"	
30	July 24	Farruko	"Pepas"		Rauw Alejandro	"Todo de Ti"	
31	July 31	Farruko	"Pepas"		Rauw Alejandro	"Todo de Ti"	
32	August 7	Farruko	"Pepas"		Rauw Alejandro	"Todo de Ti"	
33	August 14	Farruko	"Pepas"		Rauw Alejandro	"Todo de Ti"	
34	August 21	Farruko	"Pepas"		Rauw Alejandro	"Todo de Ti"	
35	August 28	Zzoilo and Aitana	"Mon Amour (Remix)"		Rauw Alejandro	"Todo de Ti"	
36	September 4	Zzoilo and Aitana	"Mon Amour (Remix)"		Rauw Alejandro	"Todo de Ti"	
37	September 11	Zzoilo and Aitana	"Mon Amour (Remix)"		Rauw Alejandro	"Todo de Ti"	
38	September 18	Zzoilo and Aitana	"Mon Amour (Remix)"		Rauw Alejandro	"Todo de Ti"	
39	September 25	Zzoilo and Aitana	"Mon Amour (Remix)"		Rauw Alejandro	"Todo de Ti"	
40	October 2	Zzoilo and Aitana	"Mon Amour (Remix)"		Måneskin	"Beggin'"	
41	October 9	C. Tangana and Nathy Peluso	"Ateo"		Zzoilo and Aitana	"Mon Amour (Remix)"	
42	October 16	C. Tangana and Nathy Peluso	"Ateo"		Nil Moliner	"Libertad"	
43	October 23	C. Tangana and Nathy Peluso	"Ateo"		Nil Moliner	"Libertad"	
44	October 30	C. Tangana and Nathy Peluso	"Ateo"		Nil Moliner	"Libertad"	
45	November 6	C. Tangana and Nathy Peluso	"Ateo"		Nil Moliner	"Libertad"	
46	November 13	Rosalía featuring The Weeknd	"La Fama"		Zzoilo and Aitana	"Mon Amour (Remix)"	
47	November 20	Rosalía featuring The Weeknd	"La Fama"		The Kid Laroi and Justin Bieber	"Stay"	
48	November 27	Rosalía featuring The Weeknd	"La Fama"		Adele	"Easy on Me"	
49	December 3	Zzoilo and Aitana	"Mon Amour (Remix)"		Elton John and Dua Lipa	"Cold Heart"	
50	December 10	Bizarrap and Morad	"Morad: Bzrp Music Sessions, Vol. 47"		Adele	"Easy on Me"	
51	December 17	Bizarrap and Morad	"Morad: Bzrp Music Sessions, Vol. 47"		Adele	"Easy on Me"	
52	December 24	Zzoilo and Aitana	"Mon Amour (Remix)"		Adele	"Easy on Me"	
1	December 31	Morad	"Pelele"		Adele	"Easy on Me"	
