= Caco de Vidro =

Studio album by Duda Brack
- Released: November 4, 2021
- Genre: Pop, cumbia, folk, funk, pagode, rock
- Length: 32:50
- Language: Portuguese, Spanish
- Label: Matogrosso/Alá Comunicação e Cultura/Altafonte (distribution)
- Producer: Duda Brack, Gabriel Ventura

Duda Brack chronology
É (2015)	Caco de Vidro (2021)

Singles from Caco de Vidro
- 1. "Toma Essa" Released: 4 November 2020; 2. "Ouro Lata" Released: 17 September 2021

Caco de Vidro (Portuguese for "Glass Shard") is the second album by Brazilian singer Duda Brack, released on 4 November 2021 through Ney Matogrosso's and Jorginho Veloso's Matogrosso and Alá Comunicação e Cultura labels; distributed by Altafonte and produced by Brack herself and Gabriel Ventura.

By the end of 2020, when she presented her audiovisual project Uma Saga de Duda Brack, she already planned to release the album (already titled back then) the following year. Around that time, she said the album would have funk, pagode, folk and Latin rhythms. The release is an evolution of her spectacle, which narrates the story of a woman who sets herself free from an abusive relationship through the female power. The singer described it as "an extremely female and also feminist album".

While preparing Caco de Vidro, Duda already created the repertoire of a third album, which will be released in the future, "as soon as possible".

== Background and concept ==
The album came after a period of depression that Brack experienced following the release of her debut É, which was followed by love disappointments and abusive relationships. Originally expected for 2020, the album ended up suspended due to the COVID-19 pandemic. It was announced for 15 October 2021 before being postponed to the 4th of the following month.

The album title, taken from its tenth track, as well as the color pattern of its cover, reference Brack's struggles around the time of its creation. According to her, "this album was an end of many cycles in my life, a process of maturing, of healing, of transmutation. So, bringing the shattering thing more like something that breaks up so that something new can emerge". The orange color in the cover art is inspired by the sexual and creative chackra, while the songs' videos use orange and blue colors to reference the Phoenix.

== Song information ==
Brack already wanted to record "Esmigalhado", by Sandro Dornelles, before the album, but the track ended up forgotten until her bassist Yuri Pimentel suggested resurrecting it in a funk format to be part of the album. The final version mixes funk with trap. It has samples of sections of A Voz do Brasil, Caetano Veloso saying "Deus é um de nós" (God is one of us), sections of Sítio do Picapau Amarelo and funk songs from the 1990s.

"Saída Obrigatória" was originally composed by Chico Chico with João Mantuano, but Brack re-worked it inspired by a recent visit to Mexico and Cuba, where she listened to a lot of cumbia. Its lyrics talk about Rio de Janeiro's night life.

The instrumental of "Carta Aberta" was originally the introduction of its following track "Man", but Brack didn't want to have such a long intro nor did she want to let the work go to waste, so she decided to have a separate track for the intro and use it as a background for her declamation of an open letter that she wrote in 2019 and had never published before. "Man" marks her first recording as a guitarist. Ian Ramil compared it with Led Zeppelin's "Since I've Been Loving You".

"Ouro Lata" was released as the second single and features Ney Matogrosso and BaianaSystem. It was produced and arranged by the two latter, composed by Brack and inspired by Open Veins of Latin America, by Eduardo Galeano. The track marked the first time in which she proposed a feat. without giving the invited artist any guidelines on how she wanted the track to sound.

"Toma Essa", released as the first single, is the second part of Uma Saga de Duda Brack, it was written by Bruna Caram, co-produced by Felipe Rosano and it received a video featuring Matogrosso and Gabriel Leone.

The closing track "Contragolpe" was based on a sample by the Hypnotic Brass Ensemble ("Lead of Way", from Book of Sounds (2017)) which was later worked on by Brack, Lúcio Maia (Nação Zumbi) and Ventura.

On 20 March 2020, she released the single "Pedalada", written by her and Chico Chico and recorded in October 2018. It was announced as part of the album, but was ultimately removed from the final track list.

== Reception ==
=== Critical ===
Professional ratings
Review scores
Source	Rating
G1	4.5/5 stars

Mauro Ferreira from G1 saw the album as representative of a wave of recent female music which incorporates anti-sexist lyrics. He called it "intense as Duda Brack's singing" and said it reinforces her "strong vocal and artistic personality". He finished his review by saying the singer "jumps and lands on her feet, standing strong on the patriarchal empire. [...] [she] confirms herself relevant and, filled with self-esteem and reason, counterattacks the Latin-American macho with precision.

== Track listing ==
Caco de Vidro tracks
No.	Title	Writer(s)	Length
1.	"Esmigalhado" (Crumbled)	Sandro Dornelles	2:14
2.	"Saída Obrigatória" (Mandatory Exit; co-produced by Elísio Freitas)	Duda Brack (music), Chico Chico (lyrics)	2:26
3.	"Tu" (You)	Júlia Vargas (music), André Vargas (lyrics)	4:23
4.	"Carta Aberta" (Open Letter)	Brack	1:23
5.	"Man"	Alzira Espíndola, Itamar Assumpção	3:15
6.	"Ouro Lata" (Gold [and] Can (featuring Ney Matogrosso and BaianaSystem))	Brack	3:28
7.	"Sueño Con Serpientes" (I Dream of Serpents)	Silvio Rodríguez	3:54
8.	"Macho Rey" (Male King (featuring Cuca Ferreira))	Ian Ramil, Juliana Cortes	2:53
9.	"Toma Essa" (Take That (featuring Os Capoeira; co-produced by Felipe Roseno)	Bruna Caram	2:57
10.	"Caco de Vidro" (Glass Shard (featuring Maycon Ananias))	André	2:26
11.	"Contragolpe" (Counterattack (featuring Lúcio Maia, Hypnotic Brass Ensemble)	Brack, Gui Fleming	3:31
Total length:			32:50

== Personnel ==
- Duda Brack — lead vocals on all tracks; guitar on "Man"; lead acoustic guitar on "Sueño con Serpientes"
- Gabriel Ventura — tenor acoutic guitar on "Man"; guitar on "Macho Rey"
- Yuri Pimentel — bass on "Carta Aberta", "Man"
- Lúcio Maia (Nação Zumbi) — guitar on "Contragolpe"
- Barbosa — drums on "Tu"
- Os Capoeira — percussion on "Toma Essa"
- Felipe Roseno — percussion on "Tu"
- Maycon Ananias — string arrangement
- Vitor Tosta — trombones on "Carta Aberta" and "Man"; brass arrangements
- Quarteto Avant Guarde — sting arrangements on "Man" and "Caco de Vidro"
- Cuca Ferreira — brass arrangement on "Macho Rey"
- Guilherme Nabhan — cover picture
