= Duda Brack =

Brazilian rock/MPB singer and guitarist

- Born: Eduarda Brack; 17 September 1993 (age 32); Porto Alegre, Rio Grande do Sul, Brazil
- Genres: Rock, MPB
- Occupations: Singer, songwriter
- Instruments: Singing, acoustic guitar
- Website: www.dudabrack.com

Duda Brack, stage name of Eduarda Brack (Porto Alegre, 17 September 1993), is a Brazilian singer.

In 2015 Duda Brack released her debut album É independently. It started to be developed in 2013, when she had over half the songs ready and called Bruno Giorgi (Lenine's son). In an interview for Veja, Brack cited Fiona Apple, Gal Costa and Ana Cañas as references for the album.

In 2017, she joined Secos & Molhados tribute band Primavera nos Dentes, along with Charles Gavin, Paulo Rafael, Pedro Coelho and Felipe Ventura.

In November 2021, she released her second album Caco de Vidro, featuring Ney Matogrosso and produced by her and Gabriel Ventura.

== Discography ==
- É (2015)
- Caco de Vidro (2021)
