= Targino Gondim =

Brazilian singer and songwriter (born 1972)

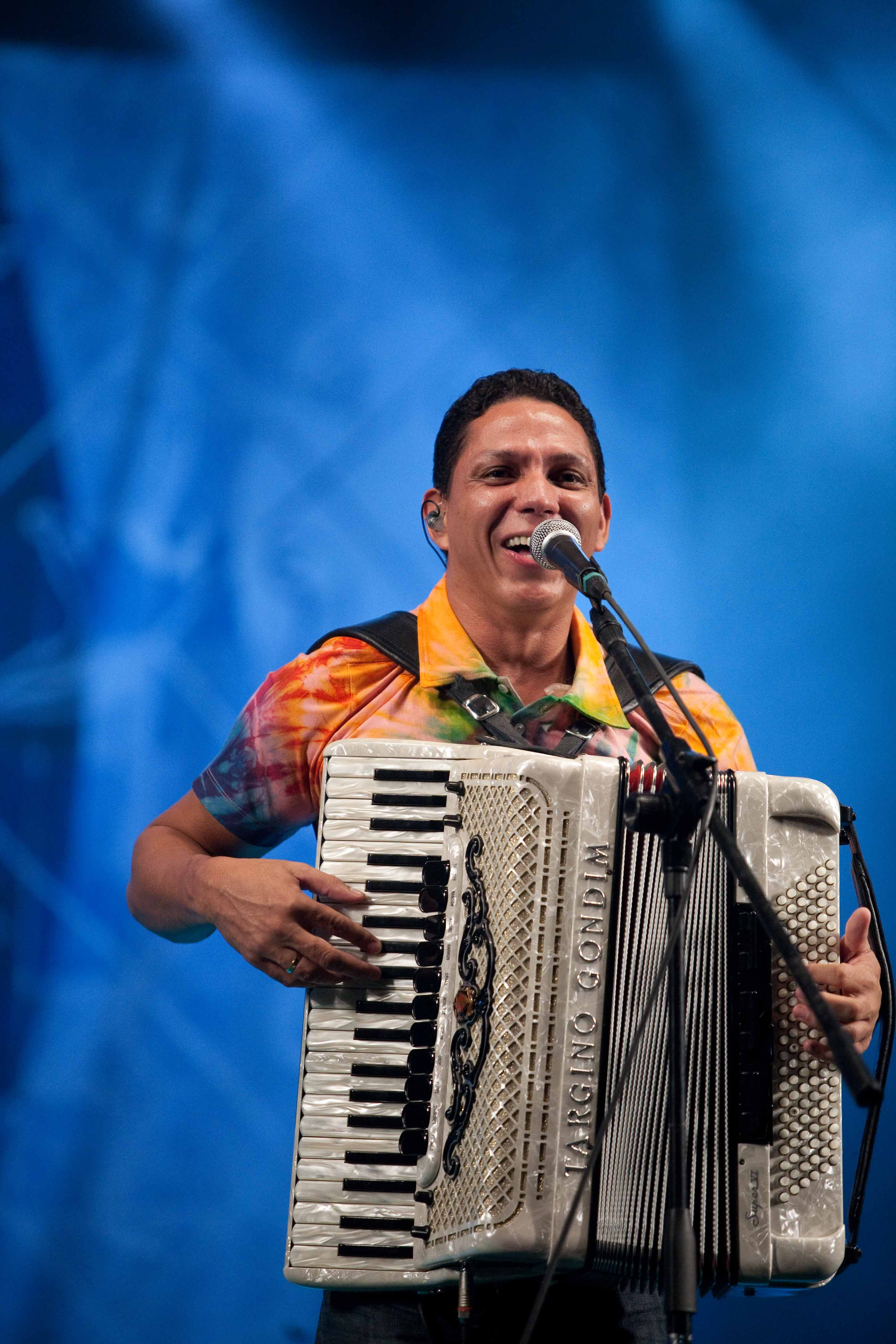
- Born: Targino Alves Gondim Filho; 7 October 1972 (age 53); Salgueiro, Brazil
- Occupations: Singer; songwriter; politician

Targino Alves Gondim Filho (born 7 October 1972) is a Brazilian musician, singer, songwriter and politician, famous in the North and Northeast of the country for June, forró, baião and other songs of the genre.

Having been named best regional singer in 2010, his song "Esperando na Janela" won him a Latin Grammy in 2001 and was the most performed in Brazil in 2004. Although he was born in Pernambuco, he lived in Bahia as a child, where he tried his hand at politics. When he completed twenty years of his career, in 2015, he held a commemorative show in Salvador where, in addition to traditional forró, he played reggae and Axé.

== Biography ==
=== Early life ===
Gondim moved to the city of Juazeiro in Bahia at the age of four and, eight years later, began playing the accordion through his father's intercession so that, at the age of eighteen, he began to perform in shows in the interior cities of Pernambuco.

=== Musical career ===
Gondim's first success in the region was with "Até Mais Ver", in 1994; This led him to perform on television, gaining greater prominence. Five years later, he was discovered by presenter Regina Casé and had his song "Esperando na Janela" included in the 2000 film, Me You Them.

In 2001, Gondim performed at "Tenda Raízes" at the Rock in Rio festival and in 2004 "Esperando na Janela" became the most performed song in Brazil. The song had already won him the Latin Grammy for best Brazilian song in 2021. In addition to his own compositions, Gondim presents remakes of songs by Luiz Gonzaga and has recorded with artists such as Margareth Menezes, Elba Ramalho and Dominguinhos; his first CD, in 2001, was released by the record label "Geleia Geral", owned by Gilberto Gil. In 2010, was honored at the 21st edition of the Brazilian Music Award as the best regional singer.

=== Political career ===
In 2018, Gondim was a candidate for federal deputy for Bahia, in the Green Party, remaining as a substitute. At the time of the election, he declared that he was divorced and had completed high school and was born in the state of Bahia. In 2020, he ran for the position of vice-mayor of Juazeiro through Cidadania but was not elected.

== Discography ==
CDs by Targino Gondim:

- (1995) Targino (independent)
- (1996) Baião de Novo (independent)
- (1996) Targino (independent)
- (1997) Ouro Branco (independent)
- (1997) Targino (independent)
- (1998) Nem Por Um Milhão (independent)
- (1998) Targino (independent)
- (1999) Esperando na janela (independent)
- (1999) As Melhores (independent)
- (1999) Targino (independent)
- (2000) Inda Tô Daquele Jeito
- (2001) Dance forró mais eu (Geleia Geral)
- (2002) Toca Pra Nós Dois
- (2003) As melhores Vol.2
- (2003) Canções Joaninas
- (2004) Ao vivo
- (2005) No pé de serra
- (2005) Targino Gondim no pé de serra
- (2006) Belo Sertão
- (2006) Forró Pra Todo Lado
- (2007) Achando bom (Atração)
- (2008) As mais pedidas (Atração)
- (2009) Simplesmente assim (Atração)
- (2015) Chorando mais eu (Atração)
- (S/D) Canções de Luiz
