= Lazos y Nudos =

- Cover art for "deluxe" edition

Studio album by Abhir Hathi
- Released: May 21, 2021
- Genre: R&B/Rap
- Length: 47:02
- Language: Spanish, English

Lazos y Nudos (translated as Ties and Knots in English) is Abhir Hathi's first album. The album was released on May 21, 2021. The full slogan for this album is "No se is eres un lazo de amor o un nudo en el estómago", which translates to: I don't know if you are a tie of love or a knot in the stomach. During the course of the album, Hathi opened up about the ties and knots in his life, and collaborated with various notorious Spanish artists like Cruz Cafuné, Delaossa and Recycle J, who are very well known in the Spanish Hip-Hop/Rap scene. The Album and the fusion of artists who take part of it have, along with the artist's versatility, opened up the floor for eye-catching and meaningful songs that have since been a hit Hathi released the deluxe version of Lazos y Nudos on September 27, 2021, with additional tracks and collaborations with new artists. He describes the albums as intimate and melodic, with a dark touch.

This album happened in the middle if a breakup, a family conflict, a feeling of anxiety for various reasons including self-esteem and money. Abhir Hathi mentions these situations become a blessing for his life and for the album. After the release of the album, he mentioned many of these problems have either been overcome or solved. Some others haven't, but that's for the better, as he says. To write this album all over again, he would need to feel as if he was in that roller coaster of emotions again. Most of the songs are inspired by relationships that have affected him for the better or for the worse, for which he is very thankful for.

== Songwriting and production ==
=== Genre and inspiration ===
While Latin music, boleros or jazz was the prevalent music played in other households surrounding the artist/in the artists circle, Hathi's childhood was made up mostly of Bollywood music, which is directly tied with his family's descent. He says that despite his music not being directly inspired by Bollywood itself, the melody is.

Family greatly inspired Abhir Hathi to song write and let his emotions out in pen and paper. His grandfather particularly taught him valuable lessons that he carries and shares with his fans.

"My grandfather always told me that inspiration hits people that have a pen in their hand more, and that impacted me. If you have your pen, things will come to you because you will be in that space longer. All of the musicians and writers I know have a Whatsapp chat with themselves. My Whatsapp always starts with the same chat where I shoot my voice to remember melodies and ideas. Documenting those things and using it for inspiration is priceless and translates to money. If the idea is good and you are able to start or continue a song, it makes the song sound richer.” – Abhir Hathi

As Hathi mentions in his music, lyrics and interviews, the 928/922 movement is formed by artists that reside in the islands of Gran Canaria and Tenerife. These numbers are a direct representation of their hometown extension numbers. The 928/922 movement is formed by artists that have a unique style in their music, where emotions and storytelling are often present. This group is also known for their polished sounds, beats and distinctive voices. The complicity of this movement is real, together, this group of artists has been able to move a long way, even further from what the public expected. Through Abhir Hathi's songs, he also presents a polished sound, which is unique and distinctive.

Abhir Hathi shares that it is all about the storytelling. During the course of his songs, Hathimakes sure to communicate his point of view as if he was talking or describing something directly to the receptor, in a warm and open-hearted way. As he aims to set a particular mood for each of his songs, he decides to do so by mentioning the specific things that make that mood happen. Hathi's deep and heart felt lyrics dig into specific scenarios that have happened in his personal life. The artist mentions his passion for storytelling has directly been influenced by American Hip Hop artists like 50 Cent or Kanye West, who describe how they feel, where they are, and what they are doing in songs like "30 Hours", which really inspired him.

=== Collaborations ===
“To work with people who are so talented and are invested in me is something that you can’t buy. You can pay good professionals, but it is never going to be like working with someone who truly believes in you. For me, giving shoutouts is the minimum that I can do.

Having a good infrastructure from the creative direction right down to the people who are doing the lighting for your videos is important because you can tell when everything is well connected, and everybody did their best. I can personally tell that in many projects, and mine is one of them. When the people are there not because I paid their fees, but because they actually like my music—you can spot the difference. It’s very important to me.”

– Abhir Hathi, One37PM Interview

During the course of Lazos y Nudos, Abhir Hathi has collaborated with other artists like Recycled J, KIDDO, Delaossa and Choclock, whom made an appearance in different songs.

=== Production and recording ===
The process of recording begins at home, where Abhir Hathi song-writes and records demos individually or with friends. He likes to have work done before getting to the studio, and uses studio time very consciously. He enjoys putting it all together beforehand so that the studio becomes the place where magic happens. He refers to this magic as less compositional and more of a productional.

"Thats how I enjoy working. I like going into the studio and having the bar set to just work on my material." – Abhir Hathi, One37PM Interview

Hathi mentions this album has more than 10 people just involved in the music production phase, like Kiddo Manteca or Pablo Rousselon, both producers, or Alex Ferrer, the engineer. The people that have helped the artist in this project are, as he shares in an interview, "people he goes out for lunch with. They are his people, friends."

==== Visual production and creative direction ====
Maker Fly is the visual director behind this album, he is who supervises, creates and drives this project with Abhir Hathi. Despite not being part of the videography, Maker Fly has focused on the communication and design of the album. Maker Fly has also taken ownership in the upcoming concert posters and merchandise. The artists considers the colors for his communications and promotion in social media to be very important. The colors, purple and black, make Hathi feel identified with the music he has created for this album.

==== Videography ====
Adrian Moonchild, Tomas Conteiro, Ale Garen, Rodrigo de Pablo and Héctor Herce have all helped lead the creative direction of this album. Ranging from the artists outfits to the visual settings for the music videos. Abhir Hathi makes sure to credit his peer's work, as frequently seen in his music video's description sections in YouTube.

== Tour ==
Hathi's Lazos y Nudos tour began on November 6, 2021, in El Hierro, where he performed at a festival called Lava Circular. There will be other concerts in the cities of Tenerife, Gran Canaria, Barcelona, Madrid and Mexico City throughout the months of November 2021 to January 2022.

== Track listing ==
Track listing for Lazos y Nudos
No.	Title	Length
1.	"Lazos y Nudos"	2:13
2.	"Habibi"	2:53
3.	"Big Dawg Freestyle"	2:17
4.	"Puliendo Pakistaní"	2:51
5.	"Rodeos"	3:00
6.	"A Medias Verdades" (with Recycled J and Kiddo Manteca)	3:45
7.	"Reflejos"	2:52
8.	"Sugar Free" (interlude)	0:40
9.	"Una Bala con Mi Nombre"	2:59
10.	"Santa Cruz" (interlude)	1:27
11.	"Mil Días" (with Delaossa and Kiddo Manteca)	3:33
12.	"Perros"	3:04
13.	"Sacrificios"	5:37

Deluxe edition
No.	Title	Length
14.	"Sin Intermitentes"	3:09
15.	"Galería"	2:40
16.	"Santa Cruz" (with Choclock)	4:07

== Charts ==
Chart (2021)	Peak position
Spanish Albums (PROMUSICAE)	76
