= Don Cornelio y la Zona =

Don Cornelio y La Zona
- Origin: Buenos Aires, Argentina
- Genres: Post-punk, new wave
- Years active: 1984–1989
- Labels: EMI
- Members: Roberto "Palo" Pandolfo (voice); Alejandro Varela (guitar); Claudio Fernández (drums); Federico Ghazarossian (bass); Fernando Colombo (saxophone); Gustavo Campana (keyboards); Sergio Iskowitz (trumpet); Daniel Gorostegui Delhom (keyboards)

Don Cornelio y La Zona were a new wave and post punk band, originally from Buenos Aires, Argentina, formed in 1984. After touring the underground circuit, the group released their self-titled debut album in 1987, with great repercussions. It was produced by Andrés Calamaro and had a resounding success thanks to the airplay of the song "Ella vendrá" (in English: She will come); it was noted for its mixture of sounds with new wave and post punk unconventional instrumentations.

Following the success of its first studio material, the band would release in 1988 their second album, titled Patria o muerte, which made the band popular to the point that they were meant to open for Iggy Pop on a concert of his in the Estadio Obras Sanitarias that same year.

Despite their success, in 1989 the band split, after editing a live album, titled En vivo. In the early 1990s, Palo Pandolfo and Federico Ghazarossian reformed the band under the name of Los Visitantes.

== Discography ==
- Don Cornelio y la Zona (1987)
- Patria o muerte (1988)
- En vivo (1996)
