= Antiguo Autómata Mexicano =

Mexican techno producer

Antiguo Autómata Mexicano is the stage name of Mexican techno (as well as IDM) producer Ángel Sánchez Borges.

== Biography ==
Borges was born in 1971, in Monterrey, Nuevo León, Mexico. He is also an experimental video artist, but is perhaps most well known for his somewhat acclaimed album, Kraut Slut, released in 2007. His most recent album, called Chez Nobody, was released in 2009. Sanchez has also recorded as Seekers Who Are Lovers, releasing the You Are the Pride of Your Street EP.
