= Palo Pandolfo =

Argentine musical artist (1964–2021)

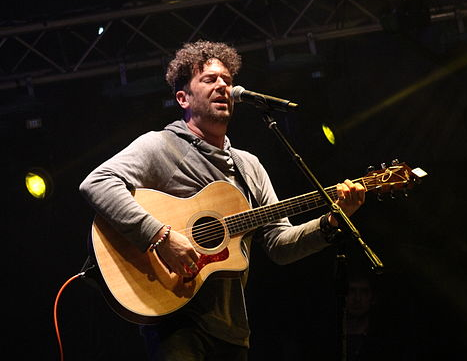

Background information
- Born: Roberto Andrés Pandolfo; November 22, 1964; Buenos Aires, Argentina
- Died: July 22, 2021 (aged 56)
- Genres: Rock, pop rock, tango
- Occupations: Musician, songwriter, singer and producer
- Instruments: Guitar and vocals
- Website: palopandolfo.com

Roberto Andrés "Palo" Pandolfo (November 22, 1964 – July 22, 2021) was an Argentine singer, musician, guitarist and producer of Argentine rock. In the 1980s, he was leader of the post-punk band Don Cornelio y la Zona, and led Los Visitantes in the following decade. Through his solo career, he released over five albums independently.

== Discography ==
=== Don Cornelio y la Zona ===
- Don Cornelio y la Zona (1987)
- Patria o muerte (1988)
- En vivo (1989)

=== Los Visitantes ===
- Salud universal (1993)
- Espiritango (1994)
- En caliente (1995)
- Maderita (1996)
- Desequilibrio (1998)
- Herido de distancia (1999)

=== Soloist ===
- A través de los sueños (2001)
- Intuición (2003)
- Antojo (2004)
- Ritual criollo (2008)
- Esto es un abrazo (2013)
