= Venturia (band) =

French progressive metal band

Venturia is a French progressive metal band.

== History ==
Venturia was formed in 2000 by guitarist Charly Sahona and drummer Diego Rapacchietti, who had already made a name for himself through his playing with artists like Zero, Paganini and BPM.

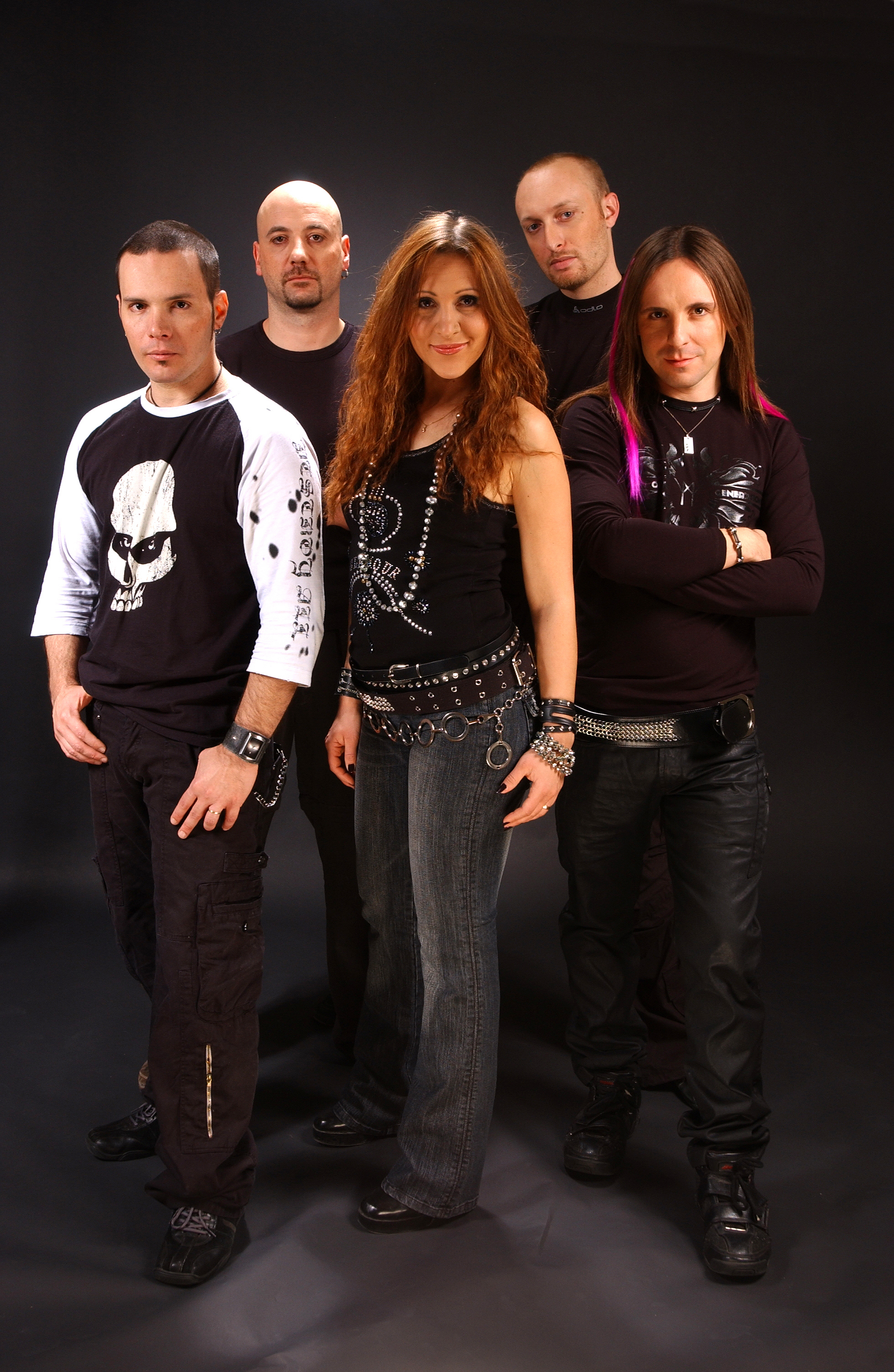
Venturia in 2008

Charly had previously worked with various French artists and participated on the Shawn Lane tribute record Shawn Lane Remembered, released on Lion Music. Bass player Thomas James later joined the band.

The band recorded a four-track demo with singer Olivier Segura and caught the attention of some labels. The band was about to begin the recording of their debut album when Olivier decided to quit the band.

Male vocalist Marc Ferreira (recruited by the band in 2004) is a solo artist from New York City. He shares vocal lines with Venturia's female vocalist Lydie Robin . Lydie and Charly were already playing together in a cover band. At first, Lydie was supposed to record some backing vocals for the band, but after the sudden departure of the former singer, Charly had the concept of having two singers.

The pop/rock-like singing of Marc contrasts with the pure, clean and sensual female voice of Lydie Robin, creating a blend of aggressive and melodic vocal duet lines.

Kevin Codfert (Adagio) was invited to share the keyboards parts with Charly on the record.

The band began recording the debut album, "The New Kingdom", in 2004; partly at Artsonik studios in Switzerland and partly at X-fade studios in France under the guiding eyes of Kevin Codfert, who also mixed the album.

The album was finalized in August 2005.

In late 2005 Venturia has signed a management deal with Danish-based metal agency Intromental. Shortly afterwards, a deal with Lion Music for the release of "The New Kingdom" was in place and it came out on April 21, 2006.

The debut album was highly acclaimed by medias. In 2007, Venturia was invited by Swiss Television TSR to record a one-hour live show. During all of that year, the band wrote new songs and worked on new sounds.

In late 2007, Venturia went to Switzerland and began the recording of their new opus, "Hybrid", at Artsonik studios. The album was recorded by Carryl Montini, and the mix was done by Kevin Codfert and Carryl Montini.
