= Bandido (Myke Towers and Juhn song) =

2020 single by Myke Towers and Juhn

Single by Myke Towers and Juhn

from the album Para Mi Ex
- Released: December 10, 2020
- Genre: Reggaeton
- Length: 3:53
- Label: White World Music
- Songwriters: Michael Anthony Torres Monge; Jorge Hernández Quiles
- Producers: Santana; White World Music

Myke Towers singles chronology
"No Me Llama" (2020)	"Bandido" (2020)	"Los Bo" (2020)

Juhn singles chronology
"Sigue Sola" (2020)	"Bandido" (2020)	"Guilla de Crema" (2021)

Music video
- "Bandido" on YouTube

"Bandido" is a song by Puerto Rican rappers and singers Myke Towers and Juhn. It was released on December 10, 2020 through White World Music. The song belongs to the Myke Towers EP called Para Mi Ex. The song became world top in several lists of Latin American countries. Also it got to position #82 in the US Billboard Hot 100 chart and the top positions on the US Hot Latin Songs chart.

== Background and release ==
Michael Anthony Torres Monge better known as Myke Towers released his EP entitled Para Mi Ex which included the song "Bandido" in collaboration with the Puerto Rican singer Juhn. The song talks about a boy who wants to defend his beloved from his boyfriend who mistreats her and does not value her. "Bandido", like the aforementioned hit, is an ode to women, as it shows a version of Towers who would do anything to make sure that his protagonist feels loved. In the song, he weaves a story about a woman who finds herself in a loveless relationship with someone who doesn't know how to truly value her and how Towers would do anything to remind him of her true beauty.

== Charts ==
=== Weekly charts ===
Weekly chart performance for "Bandido"
Chart (2021)	Peak position
Argentina Hot 100 (Billboard)	1
Bolivia (Monitor Latino)	3
Colombia (National-Report)	4
Costa Rica (Monitor Latino)	3
Dominic Republic (Monitor Latino)	11
Ecuador (Monitor Latino)	3
El Salvador (Monitor Latino)	1
Global 200 (Billboard)	11
Guatemala (Monitor Latino)	1
Honduras (Monitor Latino)	1
Mexican Streaming (AMPROFON)	3
Mexico Airplay (Billboard)	24
Nicaragua (Monitor Latino)	1
Panama (Monitor Latino)	1
Paraguay (Monitor Latino)	1
Paraguay (SGP)	1
Peru (Monitor Latino)	4
Puerto Rico (Monitor Latino)	6
Spain (PROMUSICAE)	1
US Billboard Hot 100	82
US Bubbling Under Hot 100 (Billboard)	1
US Hot Latin Songs (Billboard)	4
US Latin Airplay (Billboard)	1
US Latin Rhythm Airplay (Billboard)	1
Venezuela (Monitor Latino)	13

=== Year-end charts ===
Year-end chart performance for "Bandido"
Chart (2021)	Position
Global 200 (Billboard)	73
Spain (PROMUSICAE)	14
US Hot Latin Songs (Billboard)	10

== Certifications ==
Region	Certification	Certified units/sales
Spain (PROMUSICAE)	5× Platinum	300,000^{‡}
United States (RIAA)	3× Platinum (Latin)	180,000^{‡}
^{‡} Sales+streaming figures based on certification alone.

== See also ==
- List of Billboard number-one Latin songs of 2021
