= Interpol Remix =

EP by Interpol
- Released: November 22, 2005
- Recorded: 2005
- Genre: Post-punk revival
- Length: 24:10
- Label: Matador
- Producer: Interpol

Interpol chronology
Antics (2004)	Interpol Remix (2005)	Our Love to Admire (2007)

Professional ratings
Review scores
Source	Rating
Rolling Stone	2/5 stars
Sputnikmusic	3.0/5

Interpol Remix is the first remix EP by American rock band Interpol. It consists of four tracks from their second album Antics, each remixed by a member of the band: "Narc", "Length of Love", "Public Pervert", and "Not Even Jail", as remixed by Paul Banks, Sam Fogarino, Carlos Dengler, and Daniel Kessler, respectively.

It was released in the United States in two formats: a single CD containing all four tracks (released November 22, 2005) and a box set of four 12" vinyl records (released December 6, 2005) with one track each. The remixes were originally released as B-sides to the band's UK-only single, "C'mere" on March 30, 2006 across three different formats. Until these tracks were released on a bonus disc coupled with the special edition re-release of Antics, the only ways fans in the United States could hear these remixes were by importing the singles from the UK or downloading them via a peer-to-peer client. Interpol Remix allows fans who already purchased Antics the chance to own the remixes without buying the album again.

Each track was remixed solely by an individual member of the band, with the exception of "Fog vs. Mould for the Length of Love", on which drummer Sam Fogarino collaborated with Bob Mould.

== Track listing ==
=== Compact disc ===
1. "Narc" (Paul Banks remix) – 2:37
2. "Not Even Jail" (Daniel Kessler remix) – 5:39
3. "Fog vs. Mould for the Length of Love" – 7:46
4. "Public Pervert" (Carlos D remix) – 8:08

=== 12" vinyl ===
The vinyl box set consists of a single 12" record for each remix, which serves as the B-side to its corresponding album track. For example, the "Public Pervert" vinyl contains the Antics version of the song on the A-side and the Carlos D. remix on the B-side.

== Release details ==
Country	Date	Label	Format	Catalog
United States	November 22, 2005	Matador Records	CD	OLE675
	December 6, 2005		4 x 12"	OLE675

== See also ==
- Antics
- "C'mere"
