= Evil (Interpol song) =

2005 single by Interpol

Single by Interpol

from the album Antics
- B-side: "Leif Erikson" (Zane Lowe BBC session); "Song Seven"
- Released: January 3, 2005
- Recorded: March – May 2004
- Studio: Tarquin (Bridgeport, Connecticut)
- Genre: Indie rock; post-punk revival; gothic rock
- Length: 3:35
- Label: Matador
- Songwriters: Paul Banks; Carlos Dengler; Sam Fogarino; Daniel Kessler
- Producer: Peter Katis

Interpol singles chronology
"Slow Hands" (2004)	"Evil" (2005)	"C'mere" (2005)

"Evil" is a song by American rock band Interpol. It was released as the second single from their second studio album, Antics (2004), on January 3, 2005. The song is widely believed to be about British serial killers Fred and Rosemary West. The band, however, have denied this, telling The Guardian in 2024, "Everyone thinks 'Evil' is about serial killers but it isn't at all." According to a interview in BBC, the song was inspired by The Flowers of Evil by Charles Baudelaire, and then the song title was shortened to just "Evil".

"Evil" peaked at No. 18 on the UK Singles Chart and No. 24 on Billboard magazine's Modern Rock Tracks chart. In Australia, the song was ranked No. 76 on Triple J's Hottest 100 of 2004.

== Music video ==
A still from the song's music video showing the main character, a puppet later named "Norman" by fans

The music video, directed by Charlie White, shows a life-sized animatronic puppet who travels via ambulance to a hospital emergency room following a car crash, being examined by real-life actors as he sings the lyrics to the song before breaking into a frantic dance on the operating table. White had never made a music video before, but came up with the idea for the video after listening to the song and pitched it to the band. Despite the fact that the band had appeared in all of their prior music videos, the band loved the idea and gave White their blessing. White listened to the song on a loop for an entire weekend and hired Spectral Motion, the practical effects team who worked on films such as Hellboy and Fantastic Four, to create the puppet.

The video was shot over the course of 17 hours in one day and used a real hospital room. The puppet's animatronic head was programmed to automatically sing the song; six puppeteers, who needed to be digitally removed from the video, were tasked with moving its eyes and body. The video was a hit with audiences but the puppet itself had polarizing reactions, with some thinking it was cute and others thinking it was creepy. Regardless, the puppet received its own cult following and was named "Norman" by fans on Interpol's online message board shortly after the video premiered. The video reached No. 25 on Yahoo!'s list of the Top 25 Scariest Videos. White would later collaborate with the band again to produce the music video for their 2010 song "Lights".

Shortly after the video was released, the puppet was lost and its whereabouts remained a mystery for almost a decade. In 2014, it was spotted in an online auction in which it was simply listed as "animatronic creepy ghoul puppet from music video". At this point, the puppet had badly deteriorated, and it was sold to an unknown buyer for only a few hundred dollars. The puppet continued to change hands for the next five years, still out of the public eye. In 2019, it was purchased from another online auction by artist John Kolbek, who was able to successfully raise money from a GoFundMe campaign called "Let's save Norman!" to restore the puppet. As of 2025, the puppet is again in working order and is currently being used to host various videos on Kolbek's YouTube channel, which are usually horror-themed due to the puppet's broken-down state giving it an even scarier appearance. In March 2022, a video revealed the puppet's full restoration.

== Track listings ==
- 7" OLE6377
1. "Evil" – 3:36
2. "Leif Erikson" (Zane Lowe BBC session)
- CD OLE6372
1. "Evil" – 3:36
2. "Song Seven" – 4:50
- Maxi-CD OLE6376
1. "Evil" – 3:36
2. "Narc" (Zane Lowe BBC session) – 4:08
3. "Evil" (Zane Lowe BBC session) – 3:33
4. "Slow Hands" (video)
- Maxi-CD OLE6472
1. "Evil" – 3:36
2. "Song Seven" – 4:49
3. "Leif Erikson" (Zane Lowe BBC session) – 3:53
4. "Narc" (Zane Lowe BBC session) – 4:08
5. "Evil" (Zane Lowe BBC session) – 3:33

== In popular culture ==
The song has appeared in episodes of the television series The 100, Entourage, Grey's Anatomy, and The O.C.. It was also featured on the soundtrack of the 2022 film Orphan: First Kill.

== Charts ==
Chart (2005)	Peak position
Belgium (Back Catalogue Singles Flanders)	43
Ireland (IRMA)	35
Scotland Singles (OCC)	19
UK Singles (OCC)	18
US Alternative Airplay (Billboard)	24

== Certifications ==
Certifications and sales for "Evil"
Region	Certification	Certified units/sales
United States (RIAA)	Gold	500,000^{‡}
^{‡} Sales+streaming figures based on certification alone.
