= This Mirror Weighs a Ton =

Studio album by Interpol
- Released: August 28, 2026
- Recorded: 2024–2026
- Studios: Arcos Sound (New York City); Gonzo's (New York City)
- Genres: Post-punk; art rock
- Length: 53:27
- Label: Partisan
- Producer: Andrew Wyatt

Interpol studio album chronology
| The Other Side of Make-Believe (2022) | This Mirror Weighs a Ton (2026) |

Singles from This Mirror Weighs a Ton
- 1. "This Mirror Weighs a Ton" / "See Out Loud" Released: June 9, 2026; 2. "Iron City" Released: July 8, 2026; 3. "Wings on Fire" Released: August 28, 2026

This Mirror Weighs a Ton is the eighth studio album by the American rock band Interpol. It was released by Partisan Records on August 28, 2026, marking the band's first release since 2022's The Other Side of Make-Believe and their first album for the label after more than two decades associated with Matador Records. It was produced by Andrew Wyatt and mixed by Dave Fridmann, and was recorded in New York City—the first time in over a decade that Interpol made a record in their home city. Touring bassist Brad Truax, who had performed live with the band since replacing Carlos D in 2011, wrote and recorded bass parts for the first time, and was named an official member of the group alongside touring keyboardist Brandon Curtis, although Wyatt performed all keyboards and synthesizers on the record.

Upon release, This Mirror Weighs a Ton received widespread critical acclaim, with several critics naming it the band's strongest album since 2004's Antics. Commercially, the album debuted at number 33 on the UK Albums Chart and number 3 on the UK Independent Albums Chart, and reached number 198 on the US Billboard 200.

== Background and recording ==
Sessions for the album began in the spring of 2024, when the band convened for several days of jamming and songwriting at producer Andrew Wyatt's basement studio in the West Village, with drummer Sam Fogarino and bassist Brad Truax present. After the band's April 2024 free concert in Mexico City, they returned to New York later that year for further work at Gonzo's, a rehearsal space on St. Mark's Place where Truax had worked as a record buyer in the 1990s, before completing the album at Wyatt's Arcos studio in Lower Manhattan. It was the first Interpol album recorded in New York in over a decade; guitarist Daniel Kessler said being able to walk to and from the studio "reminded me of the old days of Interpol".

Wyatt, a member of Miike Snow and producer for Rosalía, Charli XCX and Liam Gallagher, was already a longtime collaborator of Banks, having worked on the singer's side project Banks & Steelz with RZA. Banks described the sessions as driven by a desire to "make this one count", telling NME the band felt "dead in the centre of a lot of music culture in New York City" and that this produced a "focussing effect" and "go time" feeling. He called the result "really a no-skips record for me", and said that having become a father twice since the band's previous album gave him a renewed focus rather than a change in subject matter. Speaking to Billboard, Banks credited the combination of the New York setting, the new bassist and Wyatt's production with reshaping the band's dynamic, saying the group "really just got a new chemistry" during the sessions.

Upon the album's announcement, it was revealed that Brandon Curtis and Brad Truax, the band's longtime touring keyboardist and bassist respectively, were added to the lineup as official members, though only the latter contributed to the album while Wyatt performed all the keyboards and synthesizers. Banks framed the change as reflecting the band's live configuration, saying that what listeners hear is effectively a five-piece even though Wyatt rather than Curtis played the keyboard parts. It was the first time Truax wrote and recorded bass parts for an Interpol album; Banks credited him with the Massive Attack-inspired bass sound on the title track, saying "You can thank Brad for that."

Kessler told SPIN that the songs typically began with him working at home on a classical guitar, with some starting on piano instead, and described the studio's windows overlooking the city as central to the album's mood. Birdsong recorded outside the studio at dawn and at the end of night sessions was captured and incorporated into the record. Kessler also played acoustic guitar on "So Rides the Reindeer", his first acoustic guitar part on an Interpol album. In an interview with NPR's World Cafe, Kessler discussed the album's use of woodwinds and glockenspiels and his work with Wyatt, who composed much of the record's string arrangements and other orchestrations.

In May 2026, Interpol announced they had signed to Partisan Records, ending an association with Matador Records that had covered most of their catalogue since 2002. In a statement, Banks said the band felt "in ideal company on every level", citing the label's roster and ethos.

== Composition ==
Critics and the band have described This Mirror Weighs a Ton as centered on themes of self-reflection, perception and emotional burden, reflected in the album's title. The title itself emerged from Banks's improvisational vocal process, in which melodies and phrases develop simultaneously. Reviewers noted recurring imagery of sleep, dreams and nightmares throughout the lyrics, with several songs set in the early hours of the morning. Speaking to The New York Times, Banks characterised the record as reflecting a moment in time, while Kessler described the band as evolving through what he called a process of continuous arrival, adding that the album contains hope and playfulness alongside its heaviness.

The album expands the band's palette with strings, woodwinds, layered vocal harmonies and acoustic guitar over their established guitar-and-rhythm core. The New York Times described the record's new textures as including swirling synthesizers, a woodwind section and birdsong recorded in Central Park. Far Out categorized the album's sound as post-punk and art rock.

Musically, the title track and "Iron City" have been described as among the album's most adventurous, built around warped bass and ambient sound design rather than the band's traditional guitar-first arrangements, with the title track's hypnotic groove drawing comparisons to Massive Attack. The title track, as well as "Enemy", features backing vocals by Banks's wife Juliet Seger. "See Out Loud" was noted for a rare lead vocal from Kessler, his first on an Interpol record since their 2002 debut. Banks said "Iron City" depicts "a conversation between the human narrator and the future artificial intelligence that's running things". "Wounded Soldier" addresses the psychological effects of witnessing violence through media, while "Wake Up" was described as driven by a jittery math-rock riff underpinned by a funk-inflected bassline, and "Bird and the Serpent" was highlighted for an extended, nearly two-minute outro built from propulsive percussion and throbbing electronics.

Several reviewers noted the record's second half turns towards a more experimental sound, incorporating electronics and a trio of piano-led ballads—"Iron City", "Enemy" and "Sudden"—with "Enemy" marking the first time Kessler wrote a song's melody line, drawing comparisons to Nick Cave and Warren Ellis. This shift was seen by some critics as less consistent than the album's opening tracks. Closing track "Sudden" ends the album on a stark note, its refrain repeated over uneasy chords and ambient noise.

== Artwork ==
The album cover reproduces Asymmetric Love Number 2 (2013), a sculpture by American artist Addie Wagenknecht that takes the form of a baroque chandelier constructed from fourteen CCTV cameras, steel and DSL internet cables, with the cameras pointing in different directions. The work is part of the permanent collection of the Whitney Museum of American Art in New York.

In a statement about the Asymmetric Love series, Wagenknecht described the work as concerning the duality of function and as a reflection of contemporary digital infrastructure, arguing that presenting surveillance in a familiar decorative form means the cameras go unnoticed and are therefore not perceived as a direct threat. Critics connected the image to the surveillance themes running through the album, particularly "Iron City".

== Release and promotion ==
On June 9, 2026, Interpol announced the album alongside the double A-side single "This Mirror Weighs a Ton"/"See Out Loud". Pre-orders of digital and physical editions were made available the same day. "See Out Loud" had been debuted live three months earlier, in March 2026, during the band's South American dates, and was later performed at Coachella.

The album's second single, "Iron City", was released on July 8, 2026. Its accompanying video, built around surveillance imagery echoing the album's cover, was directed by Sean Stout with creative direction by Nick Steinhardt. The title track and "See Out Loud" were issued with lyric videos rather than conventional promotional films. A lyric video for "Wings On Fire" followed around the album's release.

The album was issued on standard black double vinyl, CD and digital download, alongside several limited variants: an indie-retail exclusive translucent red double LP, a Spanish "Rojo Perlado" pressing, and a deluxe box set on red-and-black marble vinyl with a gatefold sleeve, art and lyric inserts, photo cards and a slide frame, limited to 1,000 copies worldwide. A Dolby Atmos mix was prepared at Tarbox Road Studios.

Around the album's release, Partisan reported that more than half of the band's 2.5 million monthly listeners on Spotify were under the age of 35, a figure cited by critics as evidence of a younger audience discovering the band's early catalogue.

== Critical reception ==
Professional ratings
Aggregate scores
| Source | Rating |
|---|---|
| AnyDecentMusic? | 7.9/10 |
| Metacritic | 83/100 |
Review scores
| Source | Rating |
| AllMusic | 4/5 stars |
| Clash | 8/10 |
| The Line of Best Fit | 7/10 |
| Mojo | 4/5 stars |
| musicOMH | 4/5 stars |
| NME | 4.5/5 stars |
| Pitchfork | 7.1/10 |
| Record Collector | 4/5 stars |
| Slant | 4/5 stars |
| Under the Radar | 9/10 stars |

Upon its release, This Mirror Weighs a Ton received widespread critical acclaim. At Metacritic, which assigns a normalized rating out of 100 to reviews from professional publications, the album received a score of 83 based on 19 reviews, indicating "universal acclaim". AnyDecentMusic? gave it a weighted average score of 7.9 out of 10 based on twenty critic scores.

Andrew Trendell of NME gave the album four and a half stars out of five, calling it Interpol's most unified yet experimental record in years and arguably their most consistent since Antics. He praised the band for turning their attention both inward and outward, framing the record as the group's most personal statement to date and singling out closer "Sudden" for capturing an "unceasing inner monologue". Writing for Clash, Lee Campbell awarded the album 8 out of 10 and described it as "a fantastic return" to the sound of the band's early records. Campbell highlighted the title track's "brilliantly vivid" lyricism and Daniel Kessler's first prominent lead vocal on "See Out Loud", though he singled out "So Rides the Reindeer" as a rare misstep on an otherwise strong record.

Matt Young of The Line of Best Fit gave the album 7 out of 10, praising the opening run of tracks, from the "beguiling" title track through to "Iron City", as a genuine return to the sound of Antics and Turn On the Bright Lights. He was more equivocal about the album's second half, writing that its heavier use of electronics and synth textures produced some "mid-tempo navel gazing" that only partly derailed an otherwise strong comeback. Record Collector's Shaun Curran called it the band's "most developed, creative album yet", highlighting the title track's spacious, hypnotic groove as one of the best of Interpol's career. Curran also pointed to Truax's self-written basslines as a new melodic dimension, and praised the trio of piano-led ballads "Iron City", "Enemy" and "Sudden" as evocative highlights.

John Murphy of musicOMH awarded four stars out of five, arguing that the band's formula remained fresh twenty-four years on and that subtle new embellishments had produced their best album since Antics; he singled out the chorus of "Wings On Fire" and Fogarino's drumming on "Wake Up". Mojo likewise gave it four stars, noting the record's more radio-friendly polish and the use of strings and woodwind for added sonic swirl. Jon Negroni of Slant Magazine called the album Interpol's most cohesive since 2014's El Pintor and their most ambitious since 2007's Our Love to Admire. He framed it as the band's clearest attempt yet to explore how the emotional distance that once protected them has itself become a burden. Adam Turner-Heffer of The Skinny called it "their best record in years", describing it as the work of a band evolving while revisiting what had distinguished them originally. Andy Von Pip of Under the Radar rated the album nine out of ten and judged it "one of their strongest records in years", arguing that its success came not from abandoning the band's established sound but from finding new ways to work within it.

Several reviewers emphasised the contributions of the expanded lineup. Beats Per Minute credited Wyatt with guiding the band towards both their most accessible and most experimental work in years, while observing that the arrangements sometimes confine Kessler to a rhythm role as Truax and Fogarino drive the songs. No Ripcord wrote that the band had not merely arrested a long decline but surpassed anything released in the previous two decades, ranking it behind only their first two albums. Glide Magazine judged it their strongest collection since Antics, while noting it neither matches the songcraft of their debut nor carries comparable cultural impact.

Reception was not uniformly enthusiastic. Zach Schonfeld of Pitchfork gave the album 7.1 out of 10, writing that like most Interpol records of the previous fifteen years it "feels poised for reinvention" without fully committing to one, though he judged this attempt the closest the band had come. Heather Phares of AllMusic awarded four stars out of five, observing that the experience the band brought to the record nearly a quarter-century after Turn On the Bright Lights "lets them touch on heavy feelings lightly". Spectrum Culture was more measured, suggesting that moments of brilliance came less naturally to the band than before, while acknowledging their continued ability to achieve them. Writing for XS Noize, Darren Leach was the most critical of the major reviewers, concluding that the album lacks the immediate anthems that established the band two decades earlier.

== Touring ==
Interpol toured extensively around the album's release. Earlier in 2026 the band played both weekends of Coachella and a run of South American dates, including festival appearances and headline shows in Peru, Chile and Brazil, followed by European festival dates over the summer at Mad Cool, Bilbao BBK Live, Les Vieilles Charrues, Dour Festival and Rock en Seine.

Days before the album's release, Interpol performed at All Points East presents Outbreak Fest in London's Victoria Park on August 23, 2026, supporting headliners Deftones alongside IDLES, AFI and Amyl and the Sniffers. They also appeared at the CBGB Festival in Brooklyn in September 2026 and supported Deftones at arena shows in Vancouver and Toronto.

In support of the album, the band announced an eighteen-date co-headline tour of the United Kingdom and Europe with Bloc Party for November and December 2026, with both acts performing catalogue-spanning sets. The itinerary opened in Copenhagen on November 10 and took in Berlin, Hamburg, Düsseldorf, Paris, Amsterdam, Brussels, Birmingham, Cardiff, Manchester, Brighton, Sheffield, Dublin and Glasgow before closing with two nights at London's Olympia on December 4 and 5. The pairing marked their first UK tour together since 2004, having previously co-headlined a run of Australian shows in 2023.

== Track listing ==
All lyrics are written by Paul Banks; all music is composed by Banks, Samuel Fogarino, Daniel Kessler, and Brad Truax.

This Mirror Weighs a Ton track listing
| No. | Title | Length |
|---|---|---|
| 1. | "This Mirror Weighs a Ton" | 5:12 |
| 2. | "See Out Loud" | 4:56 |
| 3. | "Iron City" | 4:10 |
| 4. | "Wounded Soldier" | 4:11 |
| 5. | "Wings On Fire" | 4:15 |
| 6. | "Ever the Actor" | 4:53 |
| 7. | "So Rides the Reindeer" | 4:16 |
| 8. | "Darling Thoughts" | 3:23 |
| 9. | "Wake Up" | 4:05 |
| 10. | "Enemy" | 4:37 |
| 11. | "Bird and the Serpent" | 5:48 |
| 12. | "Sudden" | 3:41 |
| Total length: | | 53:27 |

== Personnel ==
Credits are adapted from the album's liner notes.

Interpol

- Paul Banks – vocals, backing vocals, guitar (all tracks); piano on "See Out Loud"
- Samuel Fogarino – drums, percussion (all except "Enemy" and "Sudden")
- Daniel Kessler – guitar (all tracks); vocals on "See Out Loud", and "Wake Up"; piano on "Iron City", "Enemy", and "Sudden"
- Brad Truax – bass (all tracks); additional vocals on "See Out Loud", "So Rides the Reindeer", and "Wake Up"

Additional musicians

- Andrew Wyatt – keyboards, organ, Rhodes piano (all tracks); piano on "Wounded Soldier" and "Ever the Actor"; percussion on "Sudden"; string and orchestral arrangements
- Gunnar Olsen – percussion on "Ever the Actor", "Darling Thoughts", "Wake Up", "Bird and the Serpent", and "Sudden"
- Juliet Seger-Banks – backing vocals on "This Mirror Weighs a Ton" and "Enemy"
- Dan Iead – pedal steel guitar on "This Mirror Weighs a Ton"

Technical

- Andrew Wyatt – production
- James Ellis Ford – additional production on "See Out Loud" and "Iron City"
- Brandon Bost – engineering
- Max Wolff – engineering
- Austin Christie – engineering
- Matt Scatchell – engineering
- Salomé Sol – engineering assistant
- Jack Lauder – engineering assistant
- Dave Fridmann – mixing
- Joe LaPorta – mastering

Artwork

- Addie Wagenknecht – cover artwork (Asymmetric Love Number 2)

== Charts ==
Chart performance for This Mirror Weighs a Ton
| Chart (2026) | Peak position |
|---|---|
| Australian Albums (ARIA) | 38 |
| Austrian Albums (Ö3 Austria) | 33 |
| Belgian Albums (Ultratop Flanders) | 38 |
| Belgian Albums (Ultratop Wallonia) | 9 |
| Croatian International Albums (HDU) | 32 |
| Dutch Albums (Album Top 100) | 34 |
| French Albums (SNEP) | 67 |
| French Rock & Metal Albums (SNEP) | 5 |
| German Albums (Offizielle Top 100) | 12 |
| German Rock & Metal Albums (Offizielle Top 100) | 4 |
| Irish Albums (IRMA) | 57 |
| Irish Independent Albums (IRMA) | 5 |
| Italian Physical Albums (FIMI) | 17 |
| New Zealand Albums (RMNZ) | 33 |
| Portuguese Albums (AFP) | 117 |
| Scottish Albums (Official Charts) | 8 |
| Spanish Albums (Promusicae) | 80 |
| Swiss Albums (Schweizer Hitparade) | 13 |
| UK Albums (Official Charts) | 33 |
| UK Independent Albums (Official Charts) | 3 |
| US Billboard 200 | 198 |
| US Independent Albums (Billboard) | 29 |
