= Slow Hands (Interpol song) =

Single by Interpol

from the album Antics
- Released: August 16, 2004
- Recorded: March – May 2004
- Studio: Tarquin (Bridgeport, Connecticut)
- Genre: Indie rock; post-punk revival
- Length: 3:04
- Label: Matador
- Songwriters: Paul Banks; Carlos Dengler; Sam Fogarino; Daniel Kessler
- Producer: Peter Katis

Interpol singles chronology
"Say Hello to the Angels / NYC" (2003)	"Slow Hands" (2004)	"Evil" (2005)

"Slow Hands" is a song by American rock band Interpol. It was released as the lead single from their second studio album, Antics (2004), on August 16, 2004 as a digital single and September 13 as vinyl and CD singles. The song was written by Paul Banks, Carlos Dengler, Sam Fogarino, and Daniel Kessler.

Released on September 13, 2004, the song charted at No. 36 on the UK Singles Chart and No. 15 on Billboard magazine's Modern Rock Tracks chart. The song's radio debut was on Los Angeles station KROQ-FM. In Australia, the song was ranked No. 74 on Triple J's Hottest 100 of 2004. In June 2005, it was re-issued as the final single from Antics, charting at No. 44 on the UK Singles Chart.

== Music video ==
The music video for "Slow Hands" was directed by Daniel Levi. It features the band performing the song in an empty sports hall, interspersed with slow-motion shots (playing in reverse) of the members destroying various electrical equipment in front of their performing selves. Towards the end of the video, they become surrounded by rapidly multiplying clones of themselves also performing the song.

== In popular culture ==
The song has appeared in the video games True Crime: New York City, Guitar Hero: Warriors of Rock, and Rocksmith, as well as the Gilmore Girls episode "Tippecanoe and Taylor, Too", the Entourage episode "My Maserati Does 185", the Sweetbitter episode "Peach Treats", the Veronica Mars episode "An Echolls Family Christmas", and a 2008 Armani commercial starring Josh Hartnett.

In 2010, rapper Azealia Banks covered the song and released it on YouTube.

== Track listings ==
=== Initial UK release ===
- 7" OLE6367, CD OLE6362
1. "Slow Hands" – 3:04
2. "Slow Hands" (Dan the Automator remix) - CD only – 4:04
3. "Slow Hands" (Britt Daniel of Spoon remix) – 3:44

=== UK reissue ===
- 7" OLE6697
1. "Slow Hands" – 3:04
2. "Next Exit" (Eden Session) – 3:09
- 7" OLE6707
1. "Slow Hands" – 3:04
2. "Slow Hands" (Eden Session) – 3:09
- CD OLE6692
1. "Slow Hands" – 3:04
2. "C'mere" (Eden Session) – 3:09

== Charts ==
Chart (2004)	Peak position
UK Singles (OCC)	36
US Alternative Airplay (Billboard)	15
