= Toni (Interpol song) =

Single by Interpol

from the album The Other Side of Make-Believe
- Released: April 7, 2022
- Genre: Art rock
- Length: 4:35
- Label: Matador
- Songwriters: Daniel Kessler, Paul Banks, Sam Fogarino
- Producer: Flood

Interpol singles chronology
"The Weekend" (2019)	"Toni" (2022)	"Something Changed" (2022)

Music video
- "Toni" on YouTube

"Toni" is a song by American rock band Interpol, released in 2022 as the lead single from their seventh studio album, The Other Side of Make-Believe. First teased in January 2022, the song released with a music video directed by Van Alpert on April 7, 2022. A remix of "Toni" by Jesu was released on June 15, 2023, as the third single from Interpol's Interpolations remix album.

The single's artwork is a black-and-white edit of the first ever photo of the interaction of two supersonic shockwaves in flight, taken by NASA.

== Composition and lyrics ==
"Toni" is centered around a piano motif written by guitarist Daniel Kessler. Frontman Paul Banks said of the song:

“‘Toni’ is one of two songs that Daniel wrote with a piano as the core. It was actually one of the songs that we wrote remotely, then we got together for in-person sessions: 10-day, two-week stretches of just jamming all day. ‘Toni’ was a song that really took shape in one of those live sessions. We got Daniel mic’d up on a piano and had to make a decision: Are we going to make this a rock song? Is this going to have electric bass and electric guitar? Or is it just going to use sound effects? We decided we were going to use traditional instrumentation, and what it turned out to be is fun. It felt like a natural beginning to a record.“

In their review for The Other Side of Make-Believe, Pitchfork described "Toni" as "the heretofore-inconceivable “Interpol California song,” swapping ambient synth washes for a plinking piano, slacking the eighth-note grid just the tiniest bit, allowing Banks’ voice to relax into a world-weary but satisfied tone."

== Music video ==
The music video follows frontman Paul Banks in a police car observing a couple fleeing from a gang with weapons, confronting the couple through choreographed dances. Director Van Alpert decided to create it as a "hyper-modern, cinematic dance film", an idea he felt was new for Interpol.
