= C'mere =

Single by Interpol

from the album Antics
- Released: April 11, 2005
- Recorded: 2003-2004
- Genre: Post-punk revival; indie rock
- Length: 3:11
- Label: Matador
- Songwriters: Paul Banks; Carlos Dengler; Sam Fogarino; Daniel Kessler
- Producer: Peter Katis

Interpol singles chronology
"Evil" (2005)	"C'mere" (2005)	"The Heinrich Maneuver" (2007)

"C'mere" is a song by American rock band Interpol and is featured on the band's second studio album, Antics (2004). It was released in April 11, 2005 as the third single from that album, charting at number 19 on the UK Singles Chart (see 2005 in music).

The song was played many times at their live shows before the release of Antics, and has gone under the name "Strangers in the Night", which had some melodic and lyrical changes between different versions. The song was also included on the album's singles and promotional releases associated with Antics.

The music video for "C'mere" was directed by Associates in Science.

== Track listings ==
=== 7": Matador / OLE6647 (UK) ===
1. "C'mere" – 3:12
2. "Not Even Jail" (remix) – 5:39

=== 7": Matador / OLE6657 (UK) ===
1. "C'mere" – 3:12
2. "Narc" (Paul Banks remix) – 2:37

=== CD: Matador / OLE6642 (UK) ===
1. "C'mere" – 3:12
2. "Public Pervert" (Carlos D remix) – 8:08
3. "Length of Love" (Fog vs. Mould remix) – 7:47

=== CD: EMI / 3126172 (France) ===
1. "C'mere" – 3:12
2. "Narc" (Paul Banks remix) – 2:37
3. "Length of Love" (Fog vs. Mould remix) – 7:47
4. "Public Pervert" (Carlos D remix) – 8:08
5. "Not Even Jail" (Daniel Kessler remix) – 5:39

== Charts ==
Chart (2005)	Peak position
Poland (ZPAV)	38
Scottish Singles Sales (Official Charts)	22
UK Singles (Official Charts)	19
UK Indie (Official Charts)	1
