= Charlie White (artist) =

American artist and academic (born 1972)

- Born: 1972 (age 53–54); Philadelphia, Pennsylvania, U.S.
- Education: School of Visual Arts (BFA), and Art Center College of Design (MFA)
- Occupations: Artist, Academic
- Years active: 1996–present

Charlie White (born 1972) is an American artist and academic.

White received his BFA in 1994 from the School of Visual Arts in New York City and received his MFA from Art Center College of Design in Pasadena, California, in 1998. He held the position of professor at the Roski School of Art and Design at the University of Southern California in Los Angeles from 2003 to 2016. From 2016 to 2026, White held the positions of professor and Head of School at the Carnegie Mellon School of Art. Since July 2026, he has served as the Ralph J. Nagel Dean of the Sam Fox School of Design & Visual Arts at Washington University in St. Louis.

== Background ==
White grew up in Philadelphia and attended the Philadelphia High School for the Creative and Performing Arts. While a student at the School of Visual Arts in New York City, he worked as an assistant to artists Laurie Simmons and Carroll Dunham and studied with Marilyn Minter.

White moved to Los Angeles in 1996 to attend the ArtCenter College of Design, where he studied with artists Stephen Prina, Mike Kelley, and Christopher Williams, and received his MFA in 1998. While a student, White created the project Femalien, which was published in CHERI magazine. The magazine was sold at an exhibition at the Andrea Rosen Gallery in November/December of 1996.

== Career ==
White's photographs explore America's social fictions and collective identities. His earlier bodies of work, In a Matter of Days (1999) and Understanding Joshua (2001), were influenced by the highly staged art direction of photographers such as Jeff Wall. In 2003 White exhibited And Jeopardize the Integrity of the Hull (2003), in 2006 White exhibited Everything is American, a series of works looking at collective trauma, in 2008 White created a body of work titled, Girl Studies, which consists of a 35mm short film titled American Minor, an experimental animation titled OMG BFF LOL, and a series of new photographs. White created and exhibited the series Teen and Transgender Comparative Studies at the 2009 Hammer Biennial curated by Ali Subotnick. Continuing his work surrounding themes of American teenagers, White finished a series titled Casting Call in 2010, and in 2011 White was included in the Singapore Biennale, where he exhibited the works OMG BFF LOL from Girl Studies as well as Magazine Covers 2004-2007. In 2012 White exhibited several works at LACMA, including a new animation titled A life in B Tween, past works such as Casting Call, and the works from Girl Studies. Music for Sleeping Children was a collaborative project between White and Bryan Hollon, also in 2012. White's final body of photographs was titled Self Portrait in 2014 and was his first time photographing staged nudes and still lives. White also contributes writings to journals and publications such as Artforum and Words without Pictures. He was also the editor of The Enemy, a triannual online journal.

== Exhibition history ==
White's work has been featured within the following venues and exhibitions:

- Museum Angewandte Kunst, Frankfurt, Germany, 2015
- MU Art Space, Eindhoven, The Netherlands, 2014
- Spectator Sports, Museum of Contemporary Photography, Chicago, IL, 2013
- De madonna a Madonna: (De)construcciones de lo femenino en la sociedad contemporánea, DA2, Domus Artium, Salamanca, Spain, 2013
- The Sun and Other Stars, Los Angeles County Museum of Art, 2012
- Singapore Biennale, Singapore, 2011
- The Artist's Museum Museum of Contemporary Art, Los Angeles, 2010-2011
- Nine Lives: Visionary Artists from LA, Hammer Biennale, Hammer Museum, Los Angeles, CA, 2009
- OMG BFF LOL, The Aldrich Contemporary Art Museum, Ridgefield, CT, 2009
- Teen and Transgender Comparative Studies, 80WSE, New York University, 2009
- Contemporary Arts Museum Houston, TX, 2008
- The Puppet Show Institute of Contemporary Art, Philadelphia, 2008
- Museum of Contemporary Art Chicago, IL, 2007
- Art in America Now, Museum of Contemporary Art Shanghai, China, 2007
- ZKM Museum, Karlsruhe, Germany, 2007
- Everything is American, Center of Contemporary Art, Salamanca, Spain, 2006
- Oberösterreichische Landesmuseen, Linz, Austria, 2004
- Gertrude Contemporary Art Spaces, Melbourne, Australia, 2003
- Brooklyn Museum of Art, Brooklyn, NY, 2001
- MoMA PS1, New York, NY, 2001
- Yerba Buena Center for the Arts, San Francisco, CA, 2000

White's film American Minor was shown at the 2009 Sundance Film Festival.

== Publications ==
About White's work:

- Hysteric Four, 1999, Hysteric Glamour Japan. (limited edition)
- Charlie White Photographs, 2001, Goliath Books, Germany.
- And Jeopardize the Integrity of the Hull, 2003, TDM Paris. (limited edition)
- Charlie White, 2006, DOMUS ARTIUM, Spain. Exhibition Catalog, essays by Jan Tumlir.
- Monsters, 2007, PowerHouse Books. Essay by Sally O'Reilly, with an interview by Benjamin Weismann.
- American Minor, 2009, JRP-Ringier. Essays by Christoph Doswald and Dorothea Strauss.
- Such Appetite, 2013, Little Brown Mushroom. Edited by Alec Soth, St. Paul, MN.

== Awards ==
- 2011 MacDowell Fellow
- 2008 California Community Foundation, Mid-Career Artist's Grant

== Music videos ==
Charlie White created a music video in 2004 for the band Interpol's single "Evil", from the album Antics. He also directed the lead single for the band's 2010 self-titled release, "Lights".

Charlie White took part in the 2006 Adicolor web campaign, which invited young directors to make a short web film based on a color. White selected the color pink and worked with musician Greg Weeks.
