= The Other Side of Make-Believe =

Studio album by Interpol
- Released: July 15, 2022
- Recorded: September 2021 – January 2022
- Studio: Battery (London)
- Genre: Post-punk revival
- Length: 45:39
- Label: Matador
- Producer: Flood

Interpol chronology
A Fine Mess (2019)	The Other Side of Make-Believe (2022)	Live at Third Man Records (2024)

Singles from The Other Side of Make-Believe
- 1. "Toni" Released: April 7, 2022; 2. "Something Changed" Released: April 12, 2022; 3. "Fables" Released: May 18, 2022; 4. "Gran Hotel" Released: July 12, 2022

The Other Side of Make-Believe is the seventh studio album by American rock band Interpol, released on July 15, 2022, through Matador Records. Produced by Mark "Flood" Ellis and mixed by Alan Moulder, the album was recorded between September 2021 and January 2022 at Battery Studios in London. The songs "Toni", "Something Changed", "Fables", and "Gran Hotel" were released as singles in promotion of the album. A music video for the track "Passenger" was also released. The album title comes from the opening lyrics of the track "Passenger".

== Music and recording ==
The album was written entirely during the COVID-19 pandemic. It marked the group's first writing sessions not in person, with Paul Banks in Edinburgh, Daniel Kessler in Spain, and Sam Fogarino in Athens, Georgia; they corresponded via email. In the summer of 2021, the three reunited for continued songwriting and rehearsals in a group of houses in the Catskills, and in the autumn began recording of the album in North London with Alan Moulder and Flood, the former of whom previously mixed the band's fourth and fifth albums, Interpol (2010) and El Pintor (2014). Banks commented on the uplifting sound of the album, contrary to their trademark typically gloomy tone: "A few of the songs in particular have really unabashedly positive sentiments... something that feels good is the aspiration."

The album's lead single, "Toni", was released on April 7, 2022, alongside the album's announcement. A music video accompanied the single, directed by Van Alpert; the end of the video alludes to a forthcoming second part of the video which was unveiled on April 12 by the release of the video to a new song called "Something Changed". This video features two of the same cast as well as singer Paul Banks driving around in an unmarked police car. On May 18, the band unveiled a new single for the forthcoming album named “Fables” with a lyric video. On July 12, Interpol put out their new single "Gran Hotel" with accompanying music video, which was exclusively released on the band's Facebook page. The music video was later released on other platforms on July 15 with the release of the full album.

== Critical reception ==
Professional ratings
Aggregate scores
Source	Rating
Metacritic	72/100
Review scores
Source	Rating
AllMusic	3.5/5 stars
Clash	8/10
The Daily Telegraph	3/5 stars
The Guardian	3/5 stars
MusicOMH	4/5 stars
NME	4/5 stars
Pitchfork	6.2/10
Rolling Stone	3.5/5 stars
Slant	2.5/5 stars
Sputnikmusic	4.5/5

The Other Side of Make-Believe received generally positive reviews from music critics. At Metacritic, which assigns a normalized rating out of 100 to reviews from professional publications, the album received an average score of 72 based on 21 reviews, indicating "generally favorable reviews".

== Track listing ==
All tracks are written by Interpol (Paul Banks, Sam Fogarino, Daniel Kessler).

The Other Side of Make-Believe track listing
No.	Title	Length
1.	"Toni"	4:34
2.	"Fables"	4:34
3.	"Into the Night"	5:28
4.	"Mr. Credit"	3:48
5.	"Something Changed"	3:56
6.	"Renegade Hearts"	4:11
7.	"Passenger"	4:14
8.	"Greenwich"	4:00
9.	"Gran Hotel"	4:04
10.	"Big Shot City"	4:04
11.	"Go Easy (Palermo)"	2:46
Total length:		45:39

== Personnel ==
Personnel adapted from album liner notes, Tidal, and interviews with the band.

Interpol

- Paul Banks – vocals, guitar, bass guitar
- Sam Fogarino – drums
- Daniel Kessler – guitar, piano on "Toni" and "Something Changed"

Additional musicians

- Flood – guest vocals on "Mr. Credit"
- Richie Kennedy – guest vocals on "Mr. Credit"
- Juliet Seger – guest vocals on "Mr. Credit", "Renegade Hearts", and "Greenwich"
- Jacob Tressider – guest vocals on "Mr. Credit"

Technical personnel

- Flood – production
- Richie Kennedy – recording engineer, additional production
- Ed Farrell – assistant engineer
- Jacob Tressider – studio assistant
- Alan Moulder – mixing, additional production
- Tom Herbert – mix engineer
- Greg Calbi – mastering
- Steve Fallone – mastering

Other personnel

- Tim Head – front cover art
- Atiba Jefferson – photography
- Nicolas Ortega – rear cover art
- Undercard (Matt de Jong and Jamie-James Medina) – artwork

== Charts ==
Chart performance for The Other Side of Make-Believe
Chart (2022)	Peak position
Australian Albums (ARIA)	74
Austrian Albums (Ö3 Austria)	38
Belgian Albums (Ultratop Flanders)	45
Belgian Albums (Ultratop Wallonia)	19
Dutch Albums (Album Top 100)	42
French Albums (SNEP)	71
German Albums (Offizielle Top 100)	8
Irish Albums (IRMA)	88
Portuguese Albums (AFP)	10
Scottish Albums (Official Charts)	5
Spanish Albums (Promusicae)	43
Swiss Albums (Schweizer Hitparade)	13
UK Albums (Official Charts)	14
UK Independent Albums (Official Charts)	3
US Billboard 200	178
US Independent Albums (Billboard)	23
US Top Album Sales (Billboard)	13
US Top Alternative Albums (Billboard)	20
