= Slow Hands =

Slow Hands may refer to:

- "Slow Hands" (Interpol song), 2004
- "Slow Hands" (Niall Horan song), 2015

== See also ==
- "Slow Hand", a 1981 song by The Pointer Sisters
- Slowhand, an album by Eric Clapton, 1977
