= Everybody on My Dick Like They Supposed to Be =

Mixtape by Paul Banks
- Released: January 25, 2013
- Genres: Hip hop; instrumental hip hop
- Length: 35:51
- Label: Self-released
- Producer: Paul Banks

Paul Banks chronology
Banks (2012)	Everybody on My Dick Like They Supposed to Be (2013)	Anything But Words (2016)

Everybody on My Dick Like They Supposed to Be is a hip hop mixtape by English-American singer-songwriter and musician Paul Banks, best known as the frontman of the American rock band Interpol. Self-released on January 25, 2013 through DatPiff, it was originally intended to be a pre-release bonus for Banks' second solo studio album, Banks (2012).

In contrast to Interpol's rock music sound and earlier Banks' solo work, the mixtape features hip hop tracks and lo-fi hip hop instrumentals, all produced by Banks. It also features guest appearances from rappers El-P, Talib Kweli, High Prizm, and Mike G.

== Critical reception ==
Professional ratings
Review scores
Source	Rating
Pitchfork	2.0/10

Pitchfork critic Jayson Greene panned the mixtape, writing that none of the tracks from the record "[are] remotely salvageable". Greene also compared the instrumentals to those "on YouTube made by well-meaning college sophomores", concluding that there is "no effort, vision, or craft in this music".

== Track listing ==
No.	Title	Length
1.	"Rise Like the Sea"	1:38
2.	"Best Kill Me"	0:32
3.	"Driver"	0:50
4.	"Beauty"	1:30
5.	"What's in the Box" (Featuring Talib Kweli)	2:14
6.	"Iron Mike"	3:18
7.	"Just Don't Buy It" (Demo Excerpt)	0:33
8.	"Young Again" (Demo Excerpt)	0:54
9.	"It Was a Goal"	2:01
10.	"Only a Man (I Work for Dick Jones)"	3:08
11.	"Young Again" (Demo Excerpt pt. II)	0:19
12.	"Trace" (Featuring High Prizm)	3:08
13.	"What's in the Box Reprise" (Featuring Mike G)	2:21
14.	"Arise, Awake" (Demo Excerpt)	1:00
15.	"Show You My Footage"	1:47
16.	"Music from Club Scene - Burma"	0:50
17.	"Calgary Palm Springs"	1:20
18.	"Denmark (Fetch)"	2:07
19.	"Lost Weekend" ("Young Again" First Demo Excerpt)	0:48
20.	"Quite Enough" (Featuring El-P)	2:06
21.	"Spank Beat"	3:27
Total length:		35:51

== Personnel ==
- Paul Banks – production
- Talib Kweli – rapping (5)
- High Prizm – rapping (12)
- Mike G – rapping (13)
- El-P – rapping (20)
