= Julian Plenti Is... Skyscraper =

Julian Plenti Is...Skyscraper

Studio album by Julian Plenti
- Released: August 4, 2009
- Recorded: 2008–2009
- Studio: Seaside Lounge Studio (Brooklyn, New York)
- Genres: Alternative rock, art rock
- Length: 37:22
- Label: Matador
- Producer: Paul Banks

Julian Plenti chronology
Julian Plenti Is...Skyscraper (2009)	Banks (2012)

Julian Plenti Is... Skyscraper is the first solo album released by Paul Banks, the lead singer of the American rock band Interpol, under the name Julian Plenti. It was released on August 4, 2009.

The music video for "Games for Days" was directed by Javier Aguilera and features Emily Haines of Metric.

== Critical reception ==
Professional ratings
Review scores
Source	Rating
AllMusic	4/5 stars
Clash	(6.0/10.0)
Drowned in Sound	(6/10)
The Fly	3.5/5 stars
Gigwise	4/5 stars
Paste Magazine	(71/100)
Pitchfork Media	(6.2/10)
PopMatters	(4/10)
Spin	3.5/5 stars
NME	(positive)
Q	(4/5)

In a First Listen feature on their website, The-Fly.co.uk said that Julian Plenti is... Skyscraper "could almost be two different albums – one with folky, Bon Iver-esque lullabies and one with upbeat art-rock stomps" and that it is a "beautiful little sonic beast". ClashMusic.com reviewed the album, praising its ambition but stating that it sometimes suffered for a lack of simplicity, but added: "That said, it's a collection of eleven songs that will haunt and inspire you at the same time with a bewitching mix of influences and styles." Gigwise.com gave the album 4/5 and described it as "An ambitious attempt to give Banks his individuality back." then going on to say "Interpol may take most of the plaudits in his career but it’s Julian Plenti who reveals the true Paul Banks."

== In popular culture ==
"Only if You Run" is featured in the end credits of the Joel Schumacher film Twelve, as well as in the episode "Sabotage" of Stargate Universe. "Skyscraper" is featured in the final scenes of the 2011 American thriller film I Melt with You.

== Track listing ==
All tracks are written by Julian Plenti.

No.	Title	Length
1.	"Only if You Run"	3:49
2.	"Fun That We Have"	3:41
3.	"Skyscraper"	3:20
4.	"Games for Days"	3:57
5.	"Madrid Song"	2:08
6.	"No Chance Survival"	4:04
7.	"Unwind"	3:18
8.	"Girl on the Sporting News"	2:53
9.	"On the Esplanade"	3:41
10.	"Fly as You Might"	3:57
11.	"H"	2:39
Total length:		37:22

== Personnel ==
- Julian Plenti/Paul Banks – Vocals, Guitar, Piano, Drums, Programming, writer, producer, Artwork By [Art Direction]
- Charles Burst – Drums (tracks 1, 3, 8), Recorded By
- Yoed Nir – Cello (tracks 3, 5, 8, 9, 10, 11)
- Dmitry Ishenko – Bass & Double Bass (tracks 1, 3, 4, 6, 8, 11), Other [Session Logistics]
- Mike Stroud – Guitar Harmony (track 3)
- Jessica Pavone – Violin & Viola (tracks 1, 3, 5, 8, 10, 11)
- Sam Fogarino – Drums (track 4)
- Striker Manley – Drums (track 6)
- Glenn White – Saxophone (tracks 7, 11)
- Alex Weiss – Saxophone (track 7)

Additional

- Peter Katis – Mixed By, Producer [Additional], Music By [Additional], Recorded by [Additional]
- Greg Giorgio – Recorded by [Additional]
- Mitch Rackin – Recorded By
- Mark O – Artwork By [Design]
- Jeremy Kirkland – Other [Logic Guru]
- Trevort Luikart – Other [Logic Guru]
- Matthew Salacuse – Photography
- Noah Goldstein – Recorded by [Vocals Tracked]

== Chart performance ==
Chart (2009)	Peak position
Belgian Albums (Ultratop Flanders)	70
Belgian Albums (Ultratop Wallonia)	81
UK Albums (OCC)	171
US Billboard 200	103
US Heatseekers Albums (Billboard)	1
US Independent Albums (Billboard)	16
US Top Rock Albums (Billboard)	39
