= Muzz (band) =

American musical supergroup

- Origin: New York City, U.S.
- Genres: Art rock; folk rock; post-punk; gothic rock
- Years active: 2015–present
- Labels: Matador
- Members: Paul Banks; Matt Barrick; Josh Kaufman
- Website: muzztheband.com

Muzz is an American band based in New York City. The band consists of Paul Banks, Matt Barrick, and Josh Kaufman.

== Background ==
Paul Banks, whose voice became famous for his work with Interpol, Matt Barrick, and Josh Kaufman had all been friends that had been involved in the New York City post-punk revival scene of the early 2000s. The three began playing together in early 2015 which lead to the first demos of Muzz. In 2020, the band began recording studio material in anticipation of their self-titled debut album. This album was released on June 5, 2020.

== Discography ==
=== Studio albums ===
Title	Details	Peak chart positions					
Title	Details	US Sales	BEL (FL)	BEL (WA)	SCO	UK Sales	UK Indie
Muzz	Released: June 5, 2020; Label: Matador	96	140	119	41	50	19

=== Extended plays ===
- Covers (December 9, 2020, Matador)

=== Singles ===
- "Bad Feeling" (2020)
- "Broken Tambourine" (2020)
- "Red Western Sky" (2020)
- "Knuckleduster" (2020)

== Band members ==
- Paul Banks — vocals, guitar
- Matt Barrick — drums
- Josh Kaufman — bass guitar
