= Riot House Records =

American independent record label

- Founded: 2010
- Founder: Brian Jenkins
- Distributor: Independent Label Distribution
- Genre: Indie rock
- Country of origin: United States
- Location: San Diego, CA
- Official website: Riot House Records Official Website

Riot House Records is an independent record label specializing in rock, indie, and punk bands.

== History ==
Riot House Records was founded in 2010 by Brian Jenkins with the purpose of releasing "rock and roll records with grit and soul." The label is part of the Independent Label Distribution group, along with Sympathy for the Record Industry, Frontier Records, and Tank Crimes.

In January 2013 it was announced that Interpol's drummer Sam Fogarino had formed a new band, EmptyMansions, who signed to the label. The record titled snakes/vultures/sulfate was produced by Brandon Curtis (The Secret Machines) and features Duane Denison (Tomahawk, The Jesus Lizard) on lead guitar.

The label's current active roster includes Rough Francis, Spencer Moody of The Murder City Devils, Porcupine, and Buildings.

Riot House will release its first film, Records Collecting Dust "...a documentary film about the music and records that changed our lives", in Winter 2014. The film was written and directed by San Diego musician Jason Blackmore and features interviews with Jello Biafra, Keith Morris, Chuck Dukowski, Mike Watt, John Reis, and over 30 other underground rock icons. The film also features live performances from Jello Biafra and the Guantanamo School of Medicine, The Locust, and Big Business.

== Roster ==
- Black Jet Radio
- Buildings
- EmptyMansions
- Grand Strand
- Porcupine
- Rough Francis
- The Sacred Broncos
- Spencer Moody
- Whitemare
- White Mule

== Discography ==
- Jinx and the Back Alley Cats Fish as Friends RHR-001
- The Sacred Broncos Don't Mind /// Lions RHR-002
- Black Jet Radio Dead Wine // Ugly RHR-003
- Black Jet Radio Sex Sex Riot RHR-004
- Grand Strand Cactus Blooms RHR-005
- EmptyMansions snakes/vultures/sulfate RHR-006
- Whitemare Screamer EP RHR-007
- Porcupine I See Sound RHR-008
- Rough Francis Maximum Soul Power RHR-009
- Buildings It Doesn't Matter RHR-010
- White Mule White Mule RHR-011
- Spencer Moody Single Car Accident b/w Polish Handgun RHR-012
- Grand Tarantula Slime Times RHR-013
- Rough Francis MSP2 b/w Blind Pigs RHR-014
