= Antics (album) =

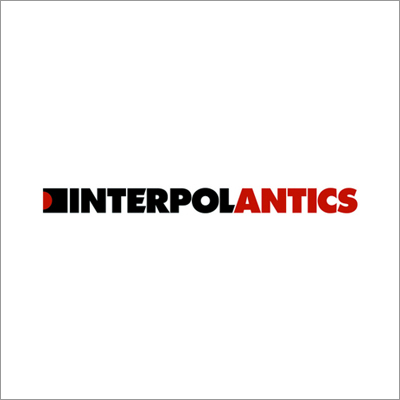

Studio album by Interpol
- Released: September 27, 2004
- Recorded: March – May 2004
- Studio: Tarquin (Bridgeport, Connecticut)
- Genres: Indie rock, post-punk revival
- Length: 41:39
- Label: Matador
- Producer: Peter Katis

Interpol chronology
The Black EP (2003)	Antics (2004)	Interpol Remix (2005)

Singles from Antics
- 1. "Slow Hands" Released: August 16, 2004; 2. "Evil" Released: January 3, 2005; 3. "C'mere" Released: April 11, 2005; 4. "Narc" Released: June 1, 2005

Antics is the second studio album by American rock band Interpol, released on September 27, 2004, by Matador Records. Upon its release, the album proved to be the band's commercial breakthrough, peaking at number fifteen on the Billboard 200 and number 21 on the UK Albums Chart, and went on to be certified gold by the RIAA in the United States.

Antics received generally favorable reviews from critics. Drowned in Sound named it the best album of 2004. Likewise, it appeared on end-of-year lists by several other music publications. It was later certified gold by the RIAA in 2009. Four singles were released from the album: "Slow Hands", "Evil", "C'mere", and "Narc".

In a 2018 interview with Vice, lead singer Paul Banks listed Antics as his favorite of the band's albums, saying: "I really put a lot of blood, sweat, and tears onto this record" and that "it felt like a very righteous pursuit". Banks also claimed that their confidence in the album's quality acted as "the perfect antidote to that sophomore slump" and the group circumvented the pressure and was able to "dive straight back in".

== Packaging ==
Morse code is used in several places throughout the album's packaging, continuing the nautical themes found in a few of the tracks' lyrics ("Take You on a Cruise", "Public Pervert", "A Time to Be So Small"). Code for the word "antics" is used on the back panel of the slipcase, as well as in the booklet; other words included in code are "length", "narc", "cruise", and "exit". Photography of the band used in the interior of the album was produced by Ami Barwell.

== Critical reception ==
Professional ratings
Aggregate scores
Source	Rating
Metacritic	80/100
Review scores
Source	Rating
AllMusic	4.5/5 stars
Blender	3/5 stars
Entertainment Weekly	B+
The Guardian	4/5 stars
Los Angeles Times	2.5/4 stars
NME	8/10
Pitchfork	8.5/10
Q	4/5 stars
Rolling Stone	4/5 stars
Spin	A−

Upon its release, Antics received generally positive reviews from music critics. At Metacritic, which assigns a normalized rating out of 100 to reviews from professional publications, the album received a Metascore of 80 based on 33 reviews, indicating "generally favorable reviews". E! Online gave it an A and said, "There's something totally irresistible about Antics: The air of mystery, the bleak but hopeful arrangements and the melodies so sharp and moving that they might inspire a night of heroic partying." Josh Modell of The A.V. Club gave it a favorable review and said that the album "may be predictable, but if predictable means rock-solid and mostly magnificent, why bother asking for more?" Mikael Wood of The Village Voice also gave it a favorable review and said, "What makes Antics such an improvement over Bright Lights is how capable Interpol have become at complementing Banks's lovely ambiguity with an increasingly precise post-punk throb." Dan Tallis of BBC Music likewise gave it a favorable review and said, "What's inescapable is that Antics does sound similar to Turn On the Bright Lights. This is despite the drummer's attempt to lift the gloom by introducing a poppy, even dance drum beat during two or three tracks. [...] However, this record has been widely praised. The difference is that Interpol have progressed. The band haven't repeated the formula, they've improved upon it."

Dave Simpson of The Guardian gave it four stars out of five, and said it "manages to dabble with tension and still emerge with something life-affirming." Uncut also gave it four stars out of five and called it "exhilarating, morbid, romantic, cool". The NME gave it a score of eight out of ten, and called it "an album scored through with a vehement beauty that, with each listen, becomes all the more acute for its unwillingness to shy away from life's bleaker, more painful moments." Jennifer Nine of Yahoo! Music UK gave it a score of eight stars out of ten and called it "a suppler record than its older brother, largely avoiding the skittish tempos of Turn On... tracks like "Roland" in favour of elegant curves and harmonies [...] though the road-honed likes of "Slow Hands" and "Not Even Jail" still hit bruisingly hard." Similarly, Under the Radar gave it eight stars out of ten, and said that while it is "ultimately a more sophisticated record, it's probably a less obvious one, too." Merek Cooper of Playlouder likewise gave it four stars out of five and said that Interpol "no longer rely on dense production and atmospherics, because they don't need to: Antics is bare-boned and beautiful." Billboard gave it a favorable review and called it "even better [than Bright Lights], possibly because the band isn't trying so hard to be weird." Salvatore Ciolfi of PopMatters also gave it eight stars out of ten and said, "Altogether, the album's feel is much more lively, bouncy, and accessible, and in combination with the band's ubiquitous ambient underpinnings, the upbeat tone often makes this collection inspiring." Bobby Mann of Flak Magazine also gave it a favorable review and said that "Interpol is less indebted to its influences, creating a distinct sound from the distinguishing characteristics that drew those comparisons in the first place."

Other reviews were average or mixed: Blender gave the album a score of three stars out of five, and called it "Less lugubrious and more melodic than [Bright Lights], but the improvement is marginal." Amneziak of Tiny Mix Tapes also gave it three stars out of five and called it "Very straightforward Interpol-lite." Mark Richardson of Paste likewise gave the album three stars out of five and said that its songs "feel heavy and significant enough--due to dynamic production and hooky choruses--even if we don't know exactly what they mean." The New York Times gave it an average review and called it "fairly uneven". Andre Perry of Crawdaddy! gave the album a mixed review and said, "I'd be overstating myself to posit Antics as a wholly offensive listening experience. Yes, I get it: this record actually sounds okay when it's being played in the background at a house party or at the rock 'n' roll bar. But that's as good as it gets: background music." Los Angeles Times gave the album two-and-a-half stars out of four and said, "The band works too hard to seem mysterious." Christopher Gray of The Austin Chronicle gave it two-and-a-half stars out of five, and said that if the album "doesn't exactly blaze off in bold new directions, it does offer an opportunity for Interpol to do some fine-tuning (not that they need much) and settle comfortably into their black, velvet-lined pocket." Robert Christgau of the Village Voice named "Next Exit" as the only good song on the album.

== Accolades ==
Accolades for Antics
Publication	Accolade	Rank
Pitchfork	Top 50 Albums of 2004	27
cokemachineglow	Top 50 Albums of 2004	12
Junkmedia	Top 10 Albums of 2004	7
Spin	Top 40 Albums of 2004	9
Under the Radar	Best Albums of 2004	2
Rolling Stone	Best Albums of 2004	No order
Tiny Mix Tapes	Best Albums of 2004	16
No Ripcord	Top 50 Albums of 2004	3
Q	Top 50 Albums of 2004	10
Drowned in Sound	Records of the Year	1
OneThirtyBPM	Top 100 Albums of the 2000s	87
Treble	Best Albums of the 00's	87
Delusions of Adequacy	Top 100 Albums of the 2000s	90
NME	500 Greatest Albums of All Time	410

== Track listing ==
All tracks are written by Paul Banks, Daniel Kessler, Carlos Dengler and Sam Fogarino.

Antics track listing
No.	Title	Length
1.	"Next Exit"	3:20
2.	"Evil"	3:35
3.	"Narc"	4:07
4.	"Take You on a Cruise"	4:54
5.	"Slow Hands"	3:04
6.	"Not Even Jail"	5:46
7.	"Public Pervert"	4:40
8.	"C'mere"	3:11
9.	"Length of Love"	4:06
10.	"A Time to Be So Small"	4:50
Total length:		41:33

2005 Limited Edition bonus disc
No.	Title	Length
1.	"Song Seven"	4:52
2.	"Narc" (Paul Banks Remix)	2:39
3.	"Not Even Jail" (Daniel Kessler Remix)	5:41
4.	"Fog Vs. Mould for the Length Of Love"	7:48
5.	"Public Pervert" (Carlos D Remix)	8:08
6.	"Slow Hands" (Music Video)	3:07
7.	"Evil" (Music Video)	3:38
8.	"C'mere" (Music Video)	3:30
Total length:		39:23

2005 Japanese Special Edition bonus disc
No.	Title	Length
1.	"Fog Vs. Mould for the Length Of Love"	7:48
2.	"Narc" (Paul Banks Remix)	2:39
3.	"Not Even Jail" (Daniel Kessler Remix)	5:41
4.	"Public Pervert" (Carlos D Remix)	8:08
5.	"Slow Hands" (Dan the Automator Remix)	4:06
6.	"Slow Hands" (Britt Daniel Remix)	3:46
7.	"Narc" (Eden Sessions)	4:08
8.	"Slow Hands" (Music Video)	3:07
9.	"Evil" (Music Video)	3:38
10.	"C'mere" (Music Video)	3:30
11.	"PDA" (Live at The Strand)	6:04
12.	"Slow Hands" (Live at The Strand)	3:03
Total length:		55:22

=== Antics: The Twentieth Anniversary Edition ===
No.	Title	Length
11.	"Direction"	3:58
Total length:		45:37

Live at Palacio de los Deportes, Mexico City, 2005
No.	Title	Length
1.	"Next Exit"	4:58
2.	"Say Hello to the Angels"	4:40
3.	"Narc"	4:43
4.	"A Time to Be So Small"	4:44
5.	"Slow Hands"	3:40
6.	"Public Pervert"	6:21
7.	"Not Even Jail"	6:10
8.	"Leif Erikson"	4:19
9.	"Evil"	4:06
10.	"Obstacle 1"	4:20
11.	"Take You on a Cruise"	6:45
12.	"PDA"	5:39
13.	"NYC"	4:18
14.	"Stella was a diver and she was always down"	6:46
15.	"Roland"	6:05
Total length:		77:34

== Personnel ==
Interpol

- Paul Banks – vocals, guitar
- Daniel Kessler – guitar
- Carlos D – bass guitar, keyboards
- Sam Fogarino – drums, percussion

Technical personnel

- All songs recorded and mixed by Peter Katis
- Assisted by Greg Giorgio
- Recorded and mixed at Tarquin Studios
- Mastered by Greg Calbi at Sterling Sound

Design

- Sean McCabe – photography, design
- Ami Barwell – photography

== Charts ==
Weekly chart performance for Antics
Chart (2004–2005)	Peak position
Australian Albums (ARIA)	21
Belgian Albums (Ultratop Flanders)	30
Belgian Albums (Ultratop Wallonia)	38
Dutch Albums (Album Top 100)	34
Finnish Albums (Suomen virallinen lista)	36
French Albums (SNEP)	11
German Albums (Offizielle Top 100)	47
Irish Albums (IRMA)	10
Italian Albums (FIMI)	19
New Zealand Albums (RMNZ)	16
Norwegian Albums (VG-lista)	28
Scottish Albums (Official Charts)	21
Swedish Albums (Sverigetopplistan)	35
Swiss Albums (Schweizer Hitparade)	99
UK Albums (Official Charts)	21
UK Independent Albums (Official Charts)	1
US Billboard 200	15
US Independent Albums (Billboard)	1

== Certifications and sales ==
Certifications and sales for Antics
Region	Certification	Certified units/sales
Australia (ARIA)	Gold	35,000^{^}
Belgium (BRMA)	Gold	25,000^{*}
Mexico	—	20,000
United Kingdom (BPI)	Gold	100,000^{^}
United States (RIAA)	Gold	501,000
^{*} Sales figures based on certification alone.^{^} Shipments figures based on certification alone.

== Release details ==
Release history and formats for Antics
Country	Date	Label	Format	Catalog number
United Kingdom	September 27, 2004	Matador	LP	OLE6161
United Kingdom	September 27, 2004	Matador	CD	OLE6162
United States	September 28, 2004	Matador	LP	OLE6161
United States	September 28, 2004	Matador	CD	OLE6162
Japan	October 6, 2004	Toshiba-EMI	CD	TOCP 66323
United States	August 23, 2005	Matador	Bonus CD	OLE6792
