= Banks (album) =

Studio album by Paul Banks
- Released: October 22, 2012
- Studios: Tarquin Studios (Bridgeport, Connecticut); Electric Lady Studios (New York City)
- Genre: Alternative rock
- Length: 39:46
- Label: Matador Records
- Producers: Paul Banks, Peter Katis

Paul Banks chronology
Julian Plenti is... Skyscraper (2009)	Banks (2012)	Everybody on My Dick Like They Supposed to Be (2013)

Singles from Banks
- 1. "The Base" Released: August 6, 2012; 2. "Young Again" Released: October 23, 2012

Professional ratings
Aggregate scores
Source	Rating
Metacritic	(65/100)
Review scores
Source	Rating
Allmusic	3.5/5 stars
Consequence of Sound	3.5/5 stars
Drowned In Sound	(7/10)
Earbuddy	(7.0/10)
Mojo	(8/10)
musicOMH	4/5 stars
NME	(8/10)
Pitchfork Media	(5.8/10)
This Is Fake DIY	(8/10)

Banks is the second solo studio album by Paul Banks, the lead singer of the American rock band Interpol. It was released on October 22, 2012. The first single and opening track, "The Base", spent 7 weeks on the Mexico Ingles Airplay chart, peaking at #43.

== Recording ==
Banks was recorded in New York City and Bridgeport, Connecticut with producer Peter Katis.

== Reception ==
Banks has received mostly positive reviews from music critics. At Metacritic, which assigns a weighted average rating out of 100 to reviews from mainstream critics, the album received an average score of 65, based on 23 reviews, which indicates "generally favorable reviews".

== Track listing ==
All tracks are written by Paul Banks.

No.	Title	Length
1.	"The Base"	3:54
2.	"Over My Shoulder"	3:25
3.	"Arise, Awake"	4:18
4.	"Young Again"	3:52
5.	"Lisbon"	3:17
6.	"I’ll Sue You"	4:21
7.	"Paid For That"	3:33
8.	"Another Chance"	4:35
9.	"No Mistakes"	3:53
10.	"Summertime Is Coming"	4:38

== Personnel ==
Personnel taken from Banks liner notes.

- Paul Banks – all performance except where noted, production, art direction & photography

Additional musicians

- Charles Burst – drums on "Over My Shoulder"
- Sebastian Thomson – drums on "No Mistakes" and "Paid For That"
- Rob Moose – violin and viola, additional violin and viola arrangements
- Yoed Nir – cello, additional cello arrangements
- Peter Katis – additional instruments
- Kareem Bunton – guest vocals on "Arise, Awake"
- Dialogue on "Another Chance" by Chris McHenry from the film "Blackout"

Technical personnel

- Peter Katis – production, recording, mixing
- Greg Giorgio – additional recording and mixing
- Claudius Mittendorfer – additional vocal engineering
- Greg Calbi – mastering

== Chart performance ==
Chart (2012)	Peak position
Austrian Albums (Ö3 Austria)	75
Belgian Albums (Ultratop Flanders)	38
Belgian Albums (Ultratop Wallonia)	75
UK Albums (OCC)	103
US Billboard 200	175
US Heatseekers Albums (Billboard)	7
US Independent Albums (Billboard)	41
