= Muzz (album) =

Studio album by Muzz
- Released: June 5, 2020
- Studios: The Isokon, Woodstock, New York
- Length: 43:20
- Label: Matador
- Producers: Paul Banks; Matt Barrick; Josh Kaufman

Muzz chronology
Muzz (2020)	Covers (2020)

Singles from Muzz
- 1. "Bad Feeling" Released: March 5, 2020; 2. "Broken Tambourine" Released: March 24, 2020; 3. "Red Western Sky" Released: April 15, 2020; 4. "Knuckleduster" Released: May 28, 2020

Muzz is the studio album by American rock supergroup Muzz. The album was released on June 5, 2020, through Matador Records.

Four singles were released ahead of the album: "Bad Feeling", "Red Western Sky", "Broken Tambourine", and "Knuckleduster".

The album was met with positive critical reception, with contemporary music journalists praising Paul Banks' vocals in a softer setting.

== Background ==
The members of Muzz: Paul Banks, Josh Kaufman, and Matt Barrick, have been friends since the early 2000s, during the height of the New York City post-punk revival scene. The three began recording demos, which laid the foundation for Muzz as far back as 2015. In late 2019 into early 2020, the band began recording material for a studio album under the name "Muzz".

On April 15, 2020, the album was announced, corresponding with their third single, "Red Western Sky".

== Release and promotion ==
=== Singles ===
Muzz released four singles prior to their self-titled album. The first single, "Bad Feeling", was released on March 5, 2020. "Broken Tambourine", the first official single through Matador, came out a few weeks later, on March 24.

On April 15, 2020, the third single "Red Western Sky" was released, along with an accompanying music video.

"Knuckleduster" was the fourth and final single released. The single was released on May 28, 2020, a week ahead of the album's release.

=== Music videos ===
The first music video released was for "Broken Tambourine", on March 24, 2020. The music video was produced by Banks, while Griffin Frazen provided creative direction and animation. The music video features an astronaut traveling and fall through outer space.

On April 15, 2020, the music video for "Red Western Sky" was released. The music video features the band performing in the American Treasure Tour Museum in Oaks, Pennsylvania. The video was directed by Derek Sexton Horani and Michael Andrade.

On May 28, 2020, the music video for "Knuckleduster" debuted. The music video, directed by Horani, features the band playing in a loading bay basement underneath an arena.

== Critical reception ==
Professional ratings
Aggregate scores
Source	Rating
Metacritic	75/100
Review scores
Source	Rating
AllMusic	3.5/5 stars
Clash	9/10
DIY	4/5 stars
Exclaim!	8/10
The Line of Best Fit	8/10
Loud and Quiet	4/10
NME	4/5 stars
Pitchfork	6.5/10
Under the Radar	8/10

Muzz was met with "generally favorable" reviews from critics. At Metacritic, which assigns a weighted average rating out of 100 to reviews from mainstream publications, this release received an average score of 75, based on 12 reviews. Aggregator Album of the Year gave the album a score of 74 out of 100 based on a critical consensus of 15 reviews.

== Track listing ==
Muzz track listing
No.	Title	Length
1.	"Bad Feeling"	2:38
2.	"Evergreen"	4:43
3.	"Red Western Sky"	3:13
4.	"Patchouli"	3:29
5.	"Everything Like It Used to Be"	3:53
6.	"Broken Tambourine"	5:21
7.	"Knuckleduster"	4:28
8.	"Chubby Checker"	2:43
9.	"How Many Days"	3:05
10.	"Summer Love"	4:03
11.	"All Is Dead to Me"	3:36
12.	"Trinidad"	2:08
Total length:		43:20

== Charts ==
Chart (2020)	Peak position
Belgian Albums (Ultratop Flanders)	140
Belgian Albums (Ultratop Wallonia)	119
Scottish Albums (Official Charts)	41
UK Independent Albums (Official Charts)	19
US Top Album Sales (Billboard)	96
