= Carlos Dengler =

American musician and actor (born 1974)

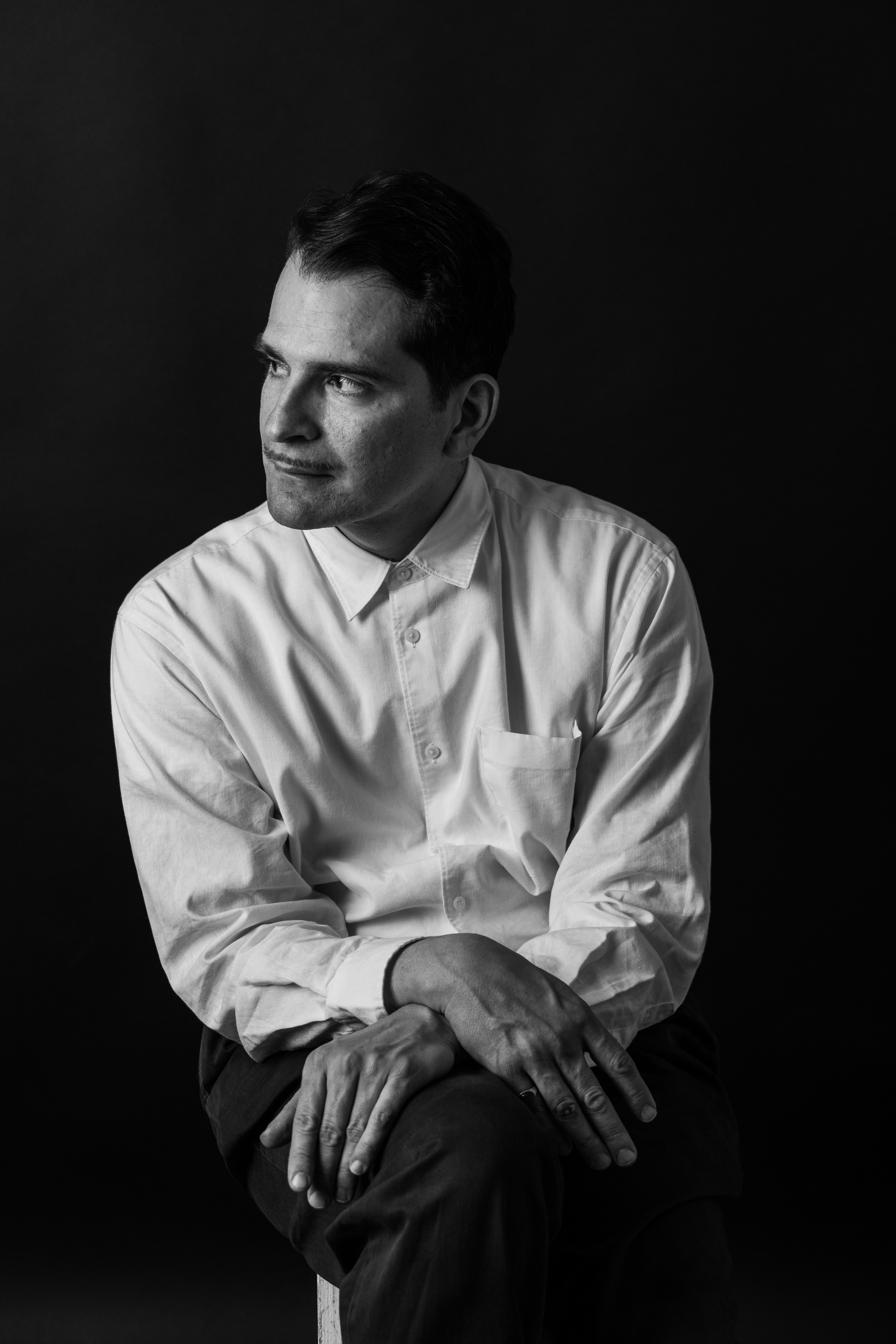
- Dengler in 2024
- Born: Carlos Andres Dengler; April 23, 1974 (age 52); Queens, New York, US
- Education: New York University (BA, MFA)
- Occupations: Musician; actor; writer
- Musical career
- Also known as: Carlos D.
- Genres: Indie rock; post-punk revival; ambient; new age
- Instruments: Bass guitar; keyboards; guitar
- Years active: 1997–present
- Labels: Matador; Capitol
- Formerly of: Interpol
- Website: Official website

Carlos Andres Dengler (born April 23, 1974) is an American musician, actor, and writer. He is best known as a co-founder, former bass guitarist and keyboardist of the American rock band Interpol.

After leaving the band in 2010, he became a classically trained actor and has performed in regional theaters and appeared in various short films. He has also scored films, and released four albums of ambient and new age music. In addition, he has written many personal essays, several of which have been published in literary journals.

== Early life and education ==
Carlos Andres Dengler was born on April 23, 1974, in Queens, New York, to a Colombian mother and a German father. He and his family lived there until his early teens, when they relocated to Lawrenceville, New Jersey. Speaking to Spin magazine in 2005, Dengler described this move and the subsequent period as formative.

He received a bachelor's degree in Philosophy at New York University College of Arts & Science in 1999 and a Master of Fine Arts degree from New York University Tisch School of the Arts in 2015.

During his time at New York University (NYU) in the late 1990s, Dengler was a club DJ. He stopped for a short time, but picked it up again, and as Interpol's fame increased, he started pulling in bigger crowds, both at the band's after-parties and separate gigs in various cities. He was the first rock star to appear on the cover of the electronic and hip-hop centered URB magazine, in 2005. The article focused on his history and talent as a DJ, thoughts on various scenes, personal style, and role as the face of the band.

== Career ==
=== 1997–2010: Interpol ===
In 1997, Dengler was approached by guitarist Daniel Kessler after a class the two had enrolled in at NYU. Kessler had been looking for musicians to play with, and assumed Dengler to be one based on the clothes he wore, a style Kessler described as "similar to the way he's dressed now". He was studying philosophy and history at the time, and wanted to pursue a career as an academic, but agreed to play with then-unformed Interpol, eventually finding his place within the group.

In addition to bass guitar, Dengler played keyboards in the studio. Until the band started hiring touring musicians in support of their first album, Turn on the Bright Lights, he played both instruments during their live performances.

He was a regular on the Lower East Side party scene. In 2005, URB magazine put him on the cover with a headline reading "Interpol + The Cult of Carlos D". Interviews tied in with the band's third album, Our Love to Admire, in 2007, however, marked a change in Dengler's attitude. Quotes from the time hint at a growing dissatisfaction with touring and the band in general. He described his switch from leather corset-belts, slicked hair, gun-holster and combat boots to bolo tie, waist coat, his natural curls and mustache as freeing: "Everyone stopped recognizing me on the street. I forgot what it's like just to be a normal person. It felt so good."

In May 2010, his departure was announced on the band's official website. The posting stated that he had participated in the writing and recording process for their fourth album, but would not be going forward with any other Interpol-related activities. A permanent replacement was not announced at the time, only that multiple players would be taking his place on the 2010 tour. Three months after the announcement, the band revealed that he actually disliked playing bass guitar. Drummer Sam Fogarino stated that Dengler had grown tired of the instrument and of touring, and that it was neither his first instrument nor his instrument of choice. For the following 16 years, Interpol had no official bass guitarist, with lead singer Paul Banks playing the bass guitar for the writing and recording of their albums. By the time of the release of This Mirror Weighs a Ton in 2026, Brad Truax, who had been the band's regular touring bass guitarist since 2011, was named a permanent band member, thus becoming Dengler's official successor. When asked if the band missed Dengler during a 2022 Reddit AMA, Banks stated: "He was difficult, but not too difficult. Total genius tbh."

==== Musical style and equipment ====
Dengler's trademark style is marked by grounded and stylized bass lines, strident staccato bursts, a clean tone brought about by his Fender Jazz Bass, and octave jumps, almost in a disco-like fashion. The low E string is lowered to D as the band writes many songs in the keys of D and B minor. One of his influences is the Joy Division/New Order bass guitarist Peter Hook. Like Hook, he also wears his bass guitar very low – often near knee level – and uses a pick to pluck the strings.

Dengler played a cream jazz bass on the Late Show with David Letterman in 2007. He never used any effects pedals, saying, "Our music is almost symphonic in nature, because the harmonic structures are defined by the union of two guitars and a bass, and sometimes keyboard as well. If I were to start freaking out with effects, it would create too much of a bass presence, or it would distract from the band's most important aspect-the unity of all those musical elements together."

He also worked with a mixture of classic synthesizer and orchestral emulations to generate arrangements for Interpol and for his scores.

=== Other musical ventures ===
Dengler has remixed songs for B-side releases including VHS or Beta's "Night on Fire", Nine Inch Nails's "Every Day is Exactly the Same" alongside Sam Fog (Interpol bandmate Samuel Fogarino), and Interpol's own "Public Pervert".

He has also scored films, and released compositions of ambient and new age music. Dengler has self-released four ambient/new age albums: Aqueduct and Ecospheres in 2022, Private Earth in 2023, and Parallel Streams in 2024.

=== 2010–present: Acting career ===
After leaving Interpol in 2010, Dengler remained out of the public light for several years. In a 2015 interview, he stated that he had since completed a graduate degree in drama from the Tisch School of the Arts at NYU, and was pursuing acting professionally. In the time between Antics (2004) and Our Love to Admire (2007), Dengler took an interest in film composition and scoring. His work in this medium includes the animation project Love Letters for the Subway. He contributed underscoring to the piece "Katya and Josh Ain't Havin' It" to the HBO Voyeur Project.

In 2016, Dengler understudied for actor Josh Radnor at Lincoln Center Theater in a production of the Richard Greenberg play The Babylon Line. He also presented an autobiographical one-man show at the 2016 New York International Fringe Festival, Homo Sapiens Interruptus, which focused on his interest in heavy metal and paleoanthropology as well as revisiting his life leading up to and including his involvement with Interpol. That same year, he was a guest musician with The 8G Band on Late Night with Seth Meyers. In 2020, Dengler appeared in the short film, A 1984 Period Piece in Present Day.

He has written many personal essays, which have been featured in n+1, the Mars Review of Books, and Tablet Magazine. In 2022, he contributed to the Rutgers University Press publication New Jersey Fan Club, writing about moving as a teenager from Queens, New York to Lawrenceville, New Jersey.
