= Paul Banks (American singer) =

British-American musician (born 1978)

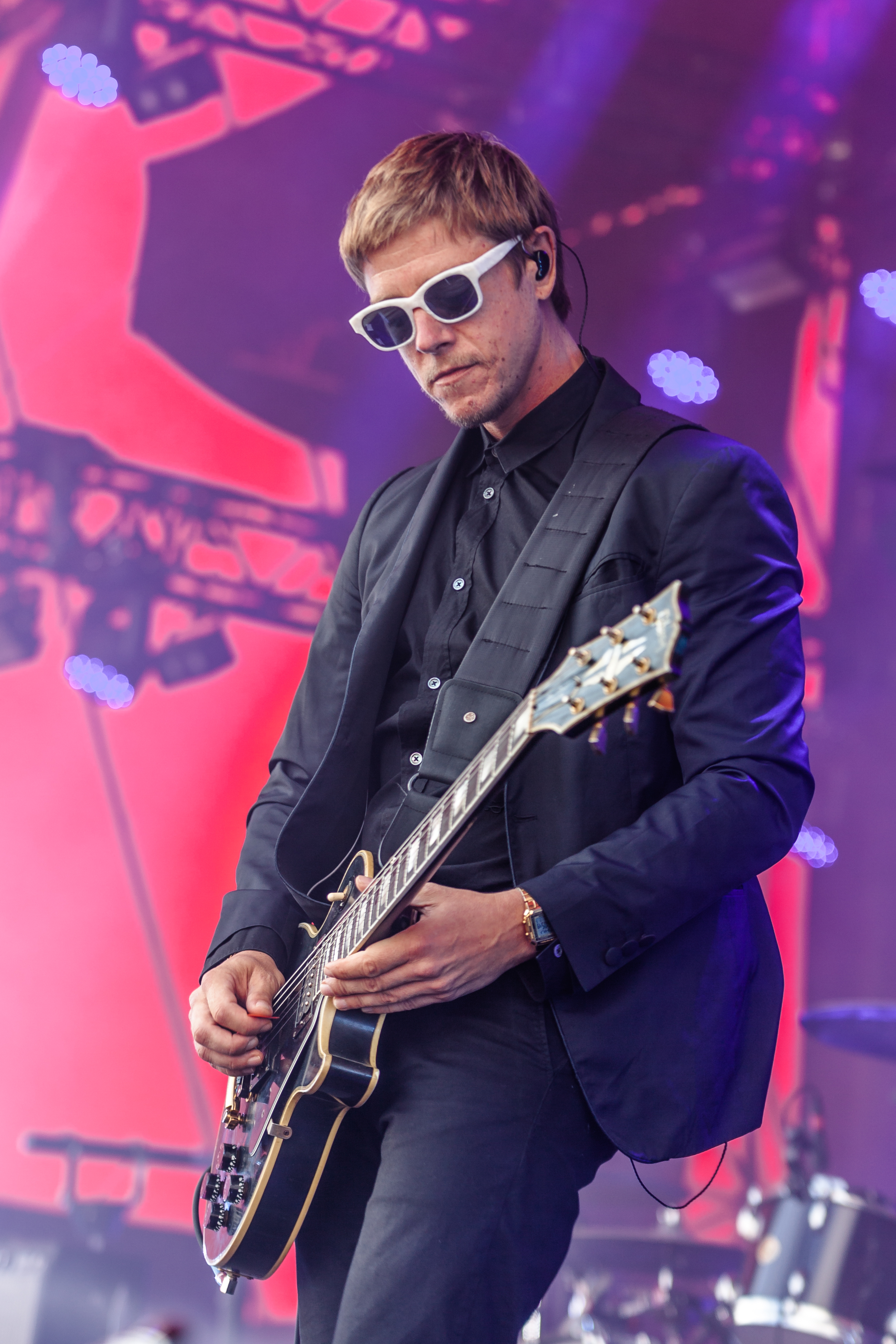
- Banks performing in 2018

Background information
- Also known as: Julian Plenti; DJ Fancypants
- Born: 3 May 1978 (age 48); Clacton-on-Sea, England
- Genres: Indie rock; post-punk revival; art pop; hip hop
- Occupations: Musician; singer; songwriter; DJ
- Instruments: Vocals; guitar; bass; piano; drums
- Years active: 1997–present
- Labels: Partisan; Matador
- Member of: Interpol; Muzz; Banks & Steelz

Paul Julian Banks (born 3 May 1978) is a British-American musician, singer, songwriter, and DJ. Noted for his baritone singing voice, he is best known as the lead vocalist and guitarist of the American rock band Interpol. He released a solo album called Julian Plenti is... Skyscraper in 2009 under the name Julian Plenti, though his solo material is now recorded under his real name.

== Early life ==
Paul Julian Banks was born in Clacton-on-Sea, England on 3 May 1978. He has an older brother. His father's corporate role for an automobile manufacturer required that the family relocate frequently. When Banks was three years old, the family left England for the U.S., temporarily lived in Bloomfield Hills, Michigan, then moved to Spain when Banks was twelve. In Spain, Banks studied at the American School of Madrid in Pozuelo de Alarcón before the family moved back to the U.S. and lived in New Jersey. His father was later transferred to Mexico, where Banks finished high school at the American School Foundation in Mexico City. Banks compared his family's constant relocating to that of a typical military family.

Banks was involved in stage productions during his time at the American School Foundation, playing the lead role in the musical South Pacific. He later attended New York University (NYU), where he studied English and comparative literature, and worked at magazines such as Gotham and Interview after graduating. He later took a data entry job at the Scholastic Corporation and worked in a café in order to devote more of his time to music.

== Career ==
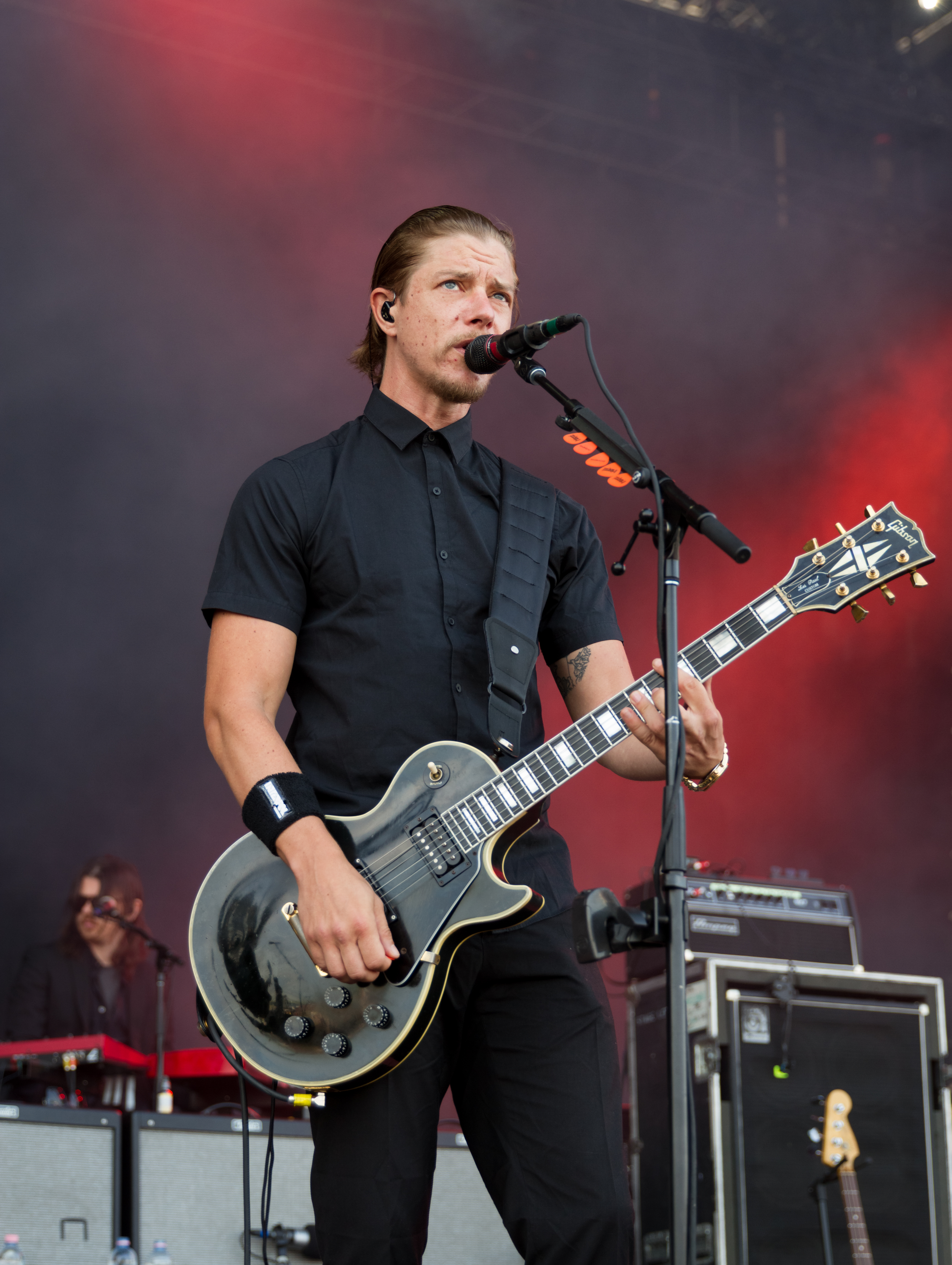
Banks using a black Les Paul Custom guitar in 2015

=== Interpol ===
In the summer of 1997, Banks reconnected with fellow NYU undergrad Daniel Kessler, whom he had met previously on a study abroad program in Paris. Kessler then asked Banks to join Interpol, a band he had started with bassist Carlos Dengler and drummer Greg Drudy. Banks was initially not inclined to join a band as he had been writing songs as a solo artist, but eventually joined Interpol as a guitarist and vocalist after listening to the type of music they were making. Beginning with Interpol's fifth album, El Pintor, Banks has also served as the band's bassist. By the time of the release of Interpol's eighth album, This Mirror Weighs A Ton, Brad Truax, the band's long-time touring bassist, had become their official bass guitarist.

=== Other projects ===
Banks has solo projects under various monikers. In August 2009, he released the solo album Julian Plenti is... Skyscraper under the name Julian Plenti, followed by the five-song EP Julian Plenti Lives... in June 2012. In October 2012, Banks released his second full-length studio album, Banks.

In 2013, Banks released the hip hop mixtape Everybody on My Dick Like They Supposed to Be, which included contributions by rappers such as Talib Kweli and El-P.

In June 2016, Banks and rapper RZA formed the duo Banks and Steelz and announced their collaborative album Anything But Words, which featured guest appearances by rappers Kool Keith, Ghostface Killah, Method Man, and Masta Killa, and singer Florence Welch. Two singles, "Love + War" and "Giant", were released.

In March 2020, Banks announced that he had teamed up with Matt Barrick (of The Walkmen and Fleet Foxes) and Josh Kaufman to form a new band called Muzz. They then released their first single, "Bad Feeling", before announcing their self-titled debut album.

== Musical style and equipment ==
Banks was inspired to become a musician by Nirvana, but has said that he does not try to emulate his greatest influences because he thinks he cannot live up to them: "I would never try to sing like Frank Black or Kurt Cobain because you just can't do it." His baritone voice, singing technique, and lyrics are most often compared to that of Joy Division frontman Ian Curtis.

During Interpol's early years, Banks typically played a black Les Paul Custom guitar. He then started using a Fender Jaguar (primarily due to the use of the tremolo in songs such as "Pioneer to the Falls") and a Gibson Flying V (which, for a time, had the word "breasts" spelled out in white tape on it) for songs from Our Love to Admire, and used his Les Paul for songs from Antics and Turn on the Bright Lights, although some songs like "Obstacle 1" were played with the Jaguar because of the impracticality of switching. Songs like "Mammoth" were recorded using his Les Paul for this same reason.

Banks used his Jaguar as his primary guitar for the end leg of the Our Love to Admire tour, and was also seen using a Gibson ES-135 for songs such as "Not Even Jail", but since the 2010 tour leg he has not been since using the Jaguar or ES-135 and has only been seen using his traditional black Les Paul in live settings. His Flying V, with the white tape now removed, can be seen in the music video for "Barricade". His ES-135 was his primary guitar during his live performances as alter ego Julian Plenti. In the 2010s, during live performances of his solo work, he began playing a Dave Murray signature Fender Stratocaster with two humbucker pickups and a middle position single coil, possibly to avoid having to change guitars between songs for the diverse sounds on his solo records. In terms of bass guitars, he has been seen using a black Fender Precision Bass with a maple fretboard.

According to one source, Banks has used effects pedals such as the Boss TU-2, Z.Vex Super Duper 2 in 1, Electro-Harmonix Micro POG, MXR Micro Amp, MXR Bass Octave Deluxe, Way Huge Swollen Pickle, Ibanez TS9DX Tube Screamer, Boss DN-2, and two MXR Carbon Copy Analog Delays (one set at higher repeats). His pedalboard on the Julian Plenti tour consisted of a Boss TU-2, Way Huge Aqua-Puss, Boss DN-2, EHX POG 2, Blackstar HT Dual Tube Distortion, and an MXR Carbon Copy. Since 2004, he has used two Fender Pro Reverb amplifiers.

== Personal life ==
Though he was born in Essex to English parents, Banks speaks with a Midwestern American accent due to growing up primarily in Michigan. As a result of his time in Spain and Mexico, he is fluent in Spanish and speaks the language with a Mexican accent. In contrast to Interpol's often melancholic indie rock sound, Banks has been a fan of hip hop since he was a child and has worked as a hip hop DJ under the pseudonym DJ Fancypants.

Banks began a relationship with Danish supermodel Helena Christensen in 2008. They split up in 2015. He later began dating fashion designer Juliet Seger, with whom he lives in Berlin. He also maintains an apartment in Lower Manhattan. In November 2022, he and Seger were engaged and expecting their first child together.

== Discography ==
=== Solo releases ===
==== Studio albums ====
List of studio albums, with selected chart positions
| Title | Album details | Peak chart positions | | | | | | | | | |
| Title | Album details | US | US Heat | US Indie | AUS Hit. | AUT | BEL (FL) | BEL (WA) | GER | UK | UK Indie |
|---|---|---|---|---|---|---|---|---|---|---|---|
| Julian Plenti Is... Skyscraper (as Julian Plenti) | Released: August 4, 2009; Label: Matador; Format(s): CD, LP, download | 103 | 1 | 16 | 20 | — | 70 | 81 | 81 | 171 | 18 |
| Banks | Released: October 22, 2012; Label: Matador; Format(s): CD, LP, download | 175 | 7 | 41 | 15 | 75 | 38 | 75 | — | 103 | 17 |
"—" denotes a recording that did not chart or was not released in that territory.

==== Soundtrack albums ====
List of soundtrack albums
| Title | Album details |
|---|---|
| Sister Midnight | Released: September 12, 2025; Label: Partisan; Format(s): LP, download |

==== EPs ====
| Title | EP details | Peak chart positions |
| Title | EP details | US Heat |
|---|---|---|
| Julian Plenti Lives... | Released: June 26, 2012; Label: Matador; Format(s): CD, 10" EP, download | 25 |

==== Singles ====
| Title | Year | Peak chart positions | | | Album |
| Title | Year | MEX | UK Phys. | UK Vinyl | Album |
|---|---|---|---|---|---|
| "Fun That We Have" | 2009 | — | — | — | Julian Plenti is... Skyscraper |
| "Only If You Run" | 2009 | — | — | — | Julian Plenti is... Skyscraper |
| "Games For Days" | 2009 | 14 | — | — | Julian Plenti is... Skyscraper |
| "The Base" | 2012 | 43 | — | — | Banks |
| "Young Again" | 2012 | | | | Banks |
| "Black Exit" (with Trztn) | 2020 | — | — | — | Royal Dagger Ballet |
| "Gimme Danger" / "Sister Midnight" | 2025 | — | 3 | 3 | Sister Midnight |
| "Boundary Rider" (with Tycho) | 2025 | — | — | — | non-album single |
"—" denotes a recording that did not chart or was not released in that territory.

=== Interpol ===
- Turn on the Bright Lights (2002)
- Antics (2004)
- Our Love to Admire (2007)
- Interpol (2010)
- El Pintor (2014)
- Marauder (2018)
- The Other Side of Make-Believe (2022)
- This Mirror Weighs a Ton (2026)

=== Banks & Steelz ===
- Anything But Words (2016)

=== Muzz ===
- Muzz (2020)
