= Daniel Kessler (guitarist) =

American musician (born 1974)

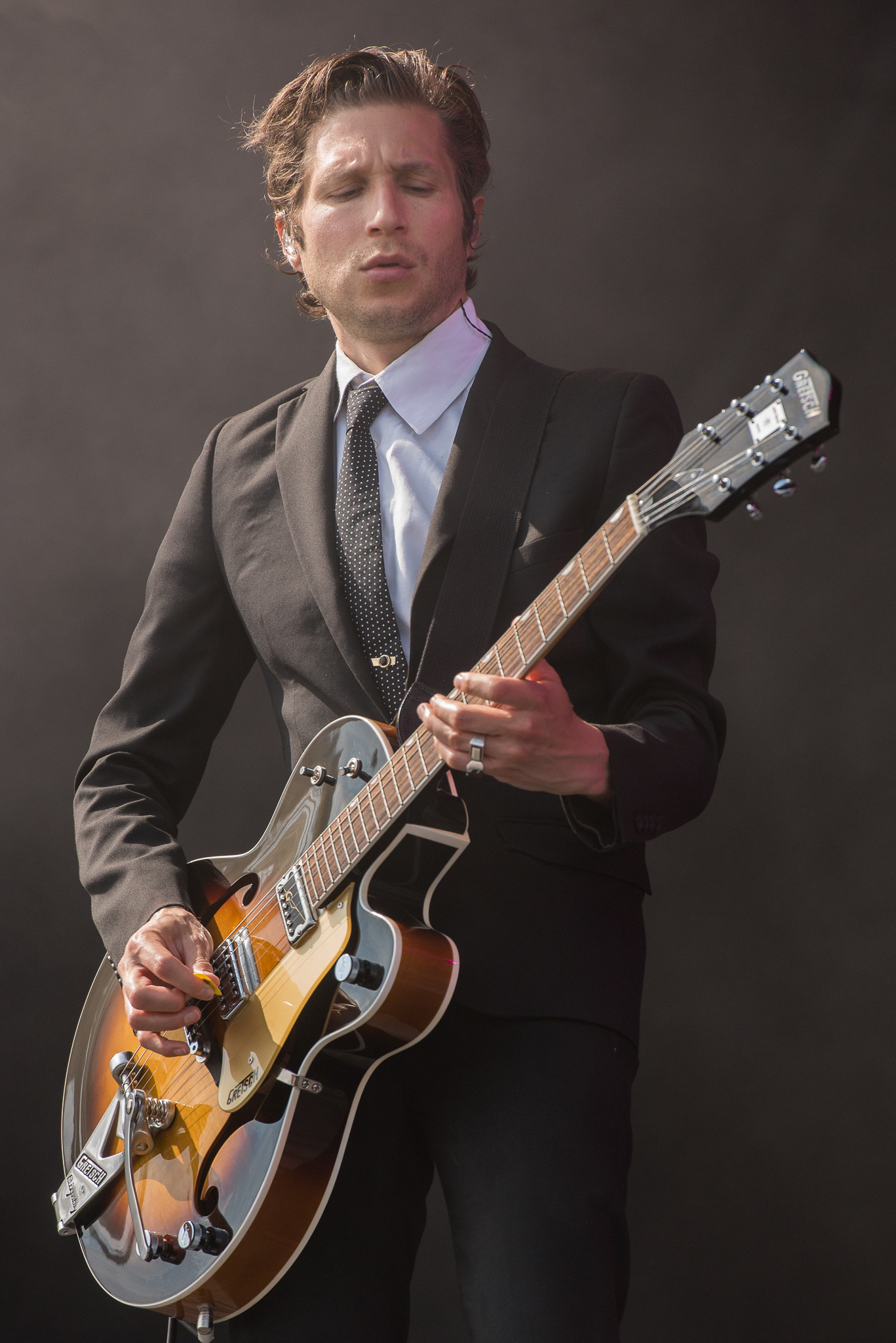
- Kessler performing with Interpol in 2015

Background information
- Born: Daniel Alexander Kessler; September 25, 1974 (age 52); London, England
- Genres: Indie rock; post-punk revival
- Instruments: Guitar; vocals; piano
- Years active: 1997–present
- Labels: Matador; Capitol; EMI

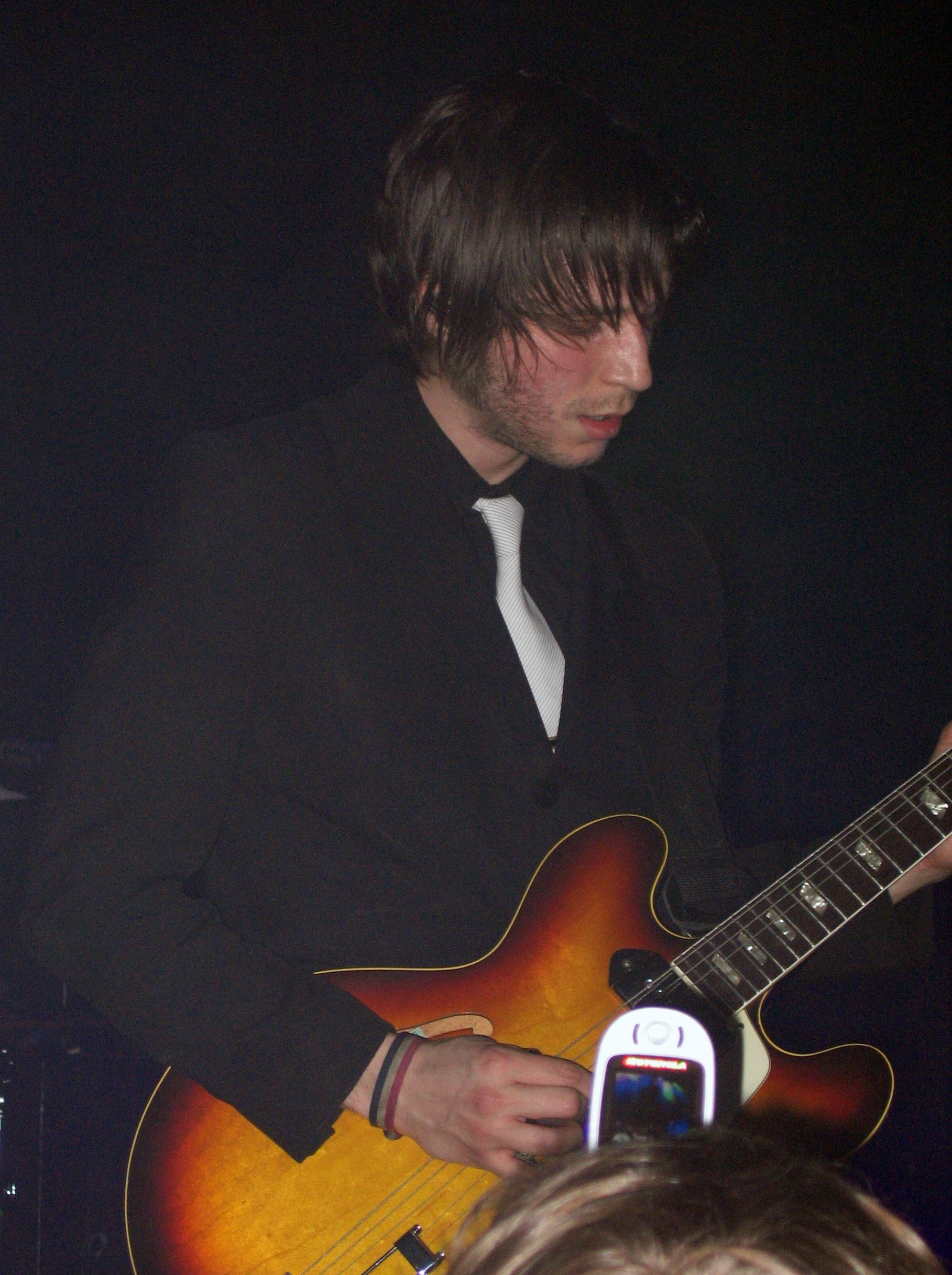
Daniel Kessler performing with Interpol at the 9:30 Club in Washington, D.C., on March 25, 2005

Daniel Alexander Kessler (born September 25, 1974) is an English-born American musician who is the guitarist for the American rock band Interpol.

== Biography ==
=== Interpol ===
Kessler was born in London, England. It was his desire to play in a band which made him approach Carlos Dengler, with whom he attended a history class in New York University. Kessler knew lead singer Paul Banks from a summer program in Paris, France, and asked him to join the band when he ran into him in New York. Kessler's dormmate Greg Drudy was Interpol's first drummer. When Drudy left the band, Kessler asked his friend Sam Fogarino to replace him.

Kessler had prior experience in the music industry while working for Domino Recording Company, and his knowledge of the business was very helpful to the band in their early years. He brought all the members together, and has said that he was looking mostly for specific personal qualities each member could bring to the group rather than just musical talent. He is a graduate of New York University's (NYU) Gallatin School of Individualized Study in French, film and literature.

Kessler has been known as the member of the band who has been the most active in the New York underground rock scene, which included his jobs at multiple record labels, such as Domino Records and trading their early demo tape around to various bands and labels.

=== Big Noble ===
In 2014, Kessler announced a new side project with sound designer Joseph Fraioli of Datach'i called Big Noble. Their debut album "First Light" was released on February 2, 2015.

== Gear ==
In the band's early days, he was seen playing a red Rickenbacker and a sunburst Telecaster, but has since performed with a vintage sunburst Epiphone Riviera with 2 P-90s, a cherry Gibson ES-330 and a cherry vintage Casino with a bigsby as his main onstage guitars. The red Rickenbacker apparently belonged to Interpol's first keyboardist. He also owned another Casino in a cherry red, that was stolen from their green room alongside one of Banks' guitars by a drug addict in Vancouver while the band was touring in support of Turn on the Bright Lights. Following Interpol's third album, Daniel has also been seen on stage playing a sunburst Gretsch 6117-TH Anniversary on the track 'The Lighthouse' and also on their self-titled album 'Interpol'.

He states in an interview around 2006, following the release of Antics, that he plays through an old Fender Twin amplifier combined with a Fender Pro Reverb.

His pedalboard includes:

- BOSS TU-2 Tuner
- BOSS TR-2 Tremolo
- BOSS DD-5 Delay (Only for Evil)
- MXR Carbon Copy
- Tech 21 Comptortion
- Vox V810
- Z.vex Super Duper 2-in-1
- Keeley Fuzz Head
- Z.vex Super Hard-On
- EHX Holy Grail

== Personal life ==
Since 2006, Kessler has resided in a loft on the Lower East Side. He is the only band member who is a pescetarian, and does not smoke. He is also fluent in French, having grown up in a village outside of Paris until the age of 11. Kessler is co-owner of the Brooklyn restaurant Bergen Hill, and is an investor in numerous New York City area bars. He is the younger brother of music journalist and former editor of Q magazine Ted Kessler. As of 2022 Kessler was reported to be living mainly in Barcelona, Spain.
