= Sam Fogarino =

American drummer (born 1968)

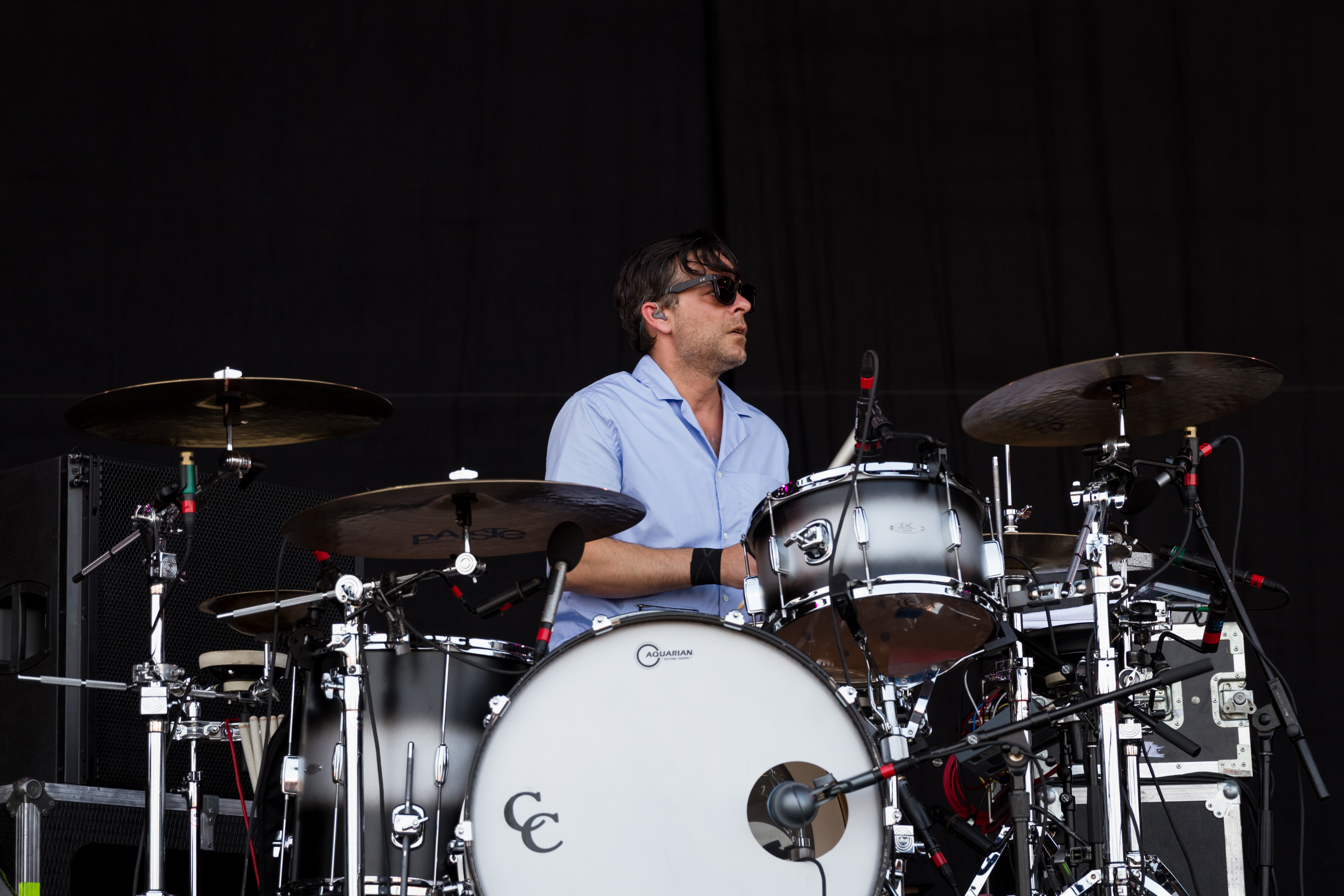
- Fogarino in 2015

Background information
- Born: August 9, 1968 (age 58); Philadelphia, Pennsylvania, U.S.
- Genres: Indie rock; post-punk revival
- Instruments: Drums; guitar; keyboards
- Years active: 1991–present
- Labels: Matador; Soft Limit; Riot House
- Member of: Interpol; Magnetic Morning; EmptyMansions

Samuel Joseph Fogarino (born August 9, 1968) is an American musician who is the drummer of the band Interpol. He has played in bands such as the Holy Terrors, Gus, the Wahoos, Napoleon Solo, the Ton-ups and the Last Night.

== Biography ==
Fogarino began to play the drums at the age of 13. In the early 1990s, Fogarino played with the South Florida act the Holy Terrors as part of a music scene that also produced Marilyn Manson, Jack Off Jill, Saigon Kick and the Mavericks. Manson asked him to join his band at one point, but Fogarino turned him down.

In 1996, Fogarino left south Florida to move to Gainesville (where he played in a band called Gus, replacing Jason Lederman), then finally settled in New York City in 1997. He first met guitarist Daniel Kessler in 1998 when he was selling vinyl in Beacon's Closet, a clothing store in Brooklyn. With more than 10 years playing experience, he joined Interpol in 2000 after original drummer Greg Drudy left the band. Fogarino played his first show for Interpol on May 20, 2000, at the Mercury Lounge.

Bobby Schayer formerly of Bad Religion worked as drum tech for Sam Fogarino from 2001 to 2011.

In early 2006, Fogarino joined with former Swervedriver frontman Adam Franklin to form a side-project band called the Setting Suns. Since then, the duo have changed their name to Magnetic Morning and released a six-track EP on iTunes.

In May 2010, Fogarino composed an accompanying soundtrack to Athens, GA Canopy Studio's "Fractured Fairy Tales" aerial dance performance.

On April 2, 2013, Fogarino released his debut side project EmptyMansions snakes/vulture/sulfate via Riot House Records. He enlisted Brandon Curtis (the Secret Machines, Interpol) to produce the record and Duane Denison (the Jesus Lizard, Tomahawk) to play lead guitars.
