= Interpol discography =

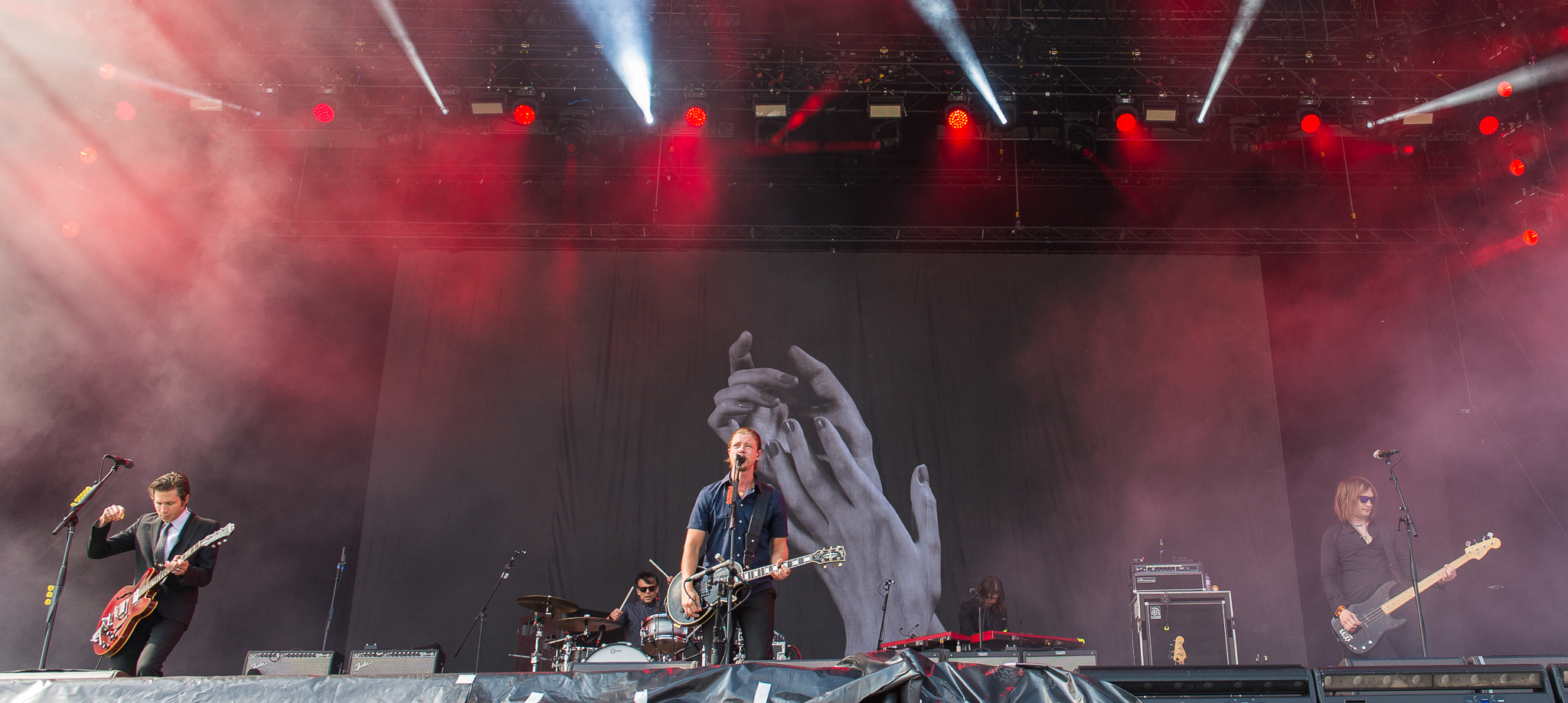
- Interpol performing in 2015
- Studio albums: 8
- Extended plays: 9
- Singles: 14
- Music videos: 15

The discography of American rock band Interpol consists of eight studio albums, nine extended plays (EPs), and fifteen singles. Interpol was formed in 1997 by New York University students Daniel Kessler and Greg Drudy, with Carlos Dengler and Paul Banks joining later. Drudy left the band in 2000, and was replaced with Sam Fogarino.

Following a self-released demo tape in 1998, the quartet's official debut was Fukd ID #3 in 2000, an EP distributed through Scottish independent record label, Chemikal Underground. The label later announced that the EP had sold out. The band then self-published their Precipitate EP in 2001, and the strength of the previous two EPs led to the band signing with Matador Records on April 26, 2002.

Interpol's first release for the label was the self-titled Interpol EP in June 2002. The EP was considered a success by music critics, and aided in shedding the band's frequent comparisons to British post-punk group Joy Division. Two of the three tracks on the EP featured on the band's debut studio album, Turn on the Bright Lights, released in 2002. The record peaked at No. 101 on the UK Albums Chart, and No. 158 on the Billboard 200. The album was certified Gold in the United Kingdom, with the record's highest-charting single "Obstacle 1" reaching No. 41 on the UK Singles Chart. Two years later, Interpol released their sophomore album Antics on September 27, 2004. The album debuted at No. 15 on the Billboard 200, and secured a top ten spot on the Irish Albums Chart. The album's second single "Evil" peaked at No. 18 in the UK Singles Chart, the band's highest-charting single in the country. Antics was certified Gold in the United Kingdom, Australia and the United States.

In 2006, Interpol left Matador to sign with major label Capitol Records. Their third full-length, Our Love to Admire, was released worldwide in 2007, and brought the band chart-topping success in Ireland. Lead single "The Heinrich Maneuver" became the band's highest and longest charting single in their home nation, spending nineteen weeks in the Billboard Alternative Songs chart, peaking at number eleven. The band's self-titled fourth album Interpol was released in 2010, with the record peaking at number one on the Billboard Independent Albums chart. Interpol was the last album featuring Dengler, who left the band in May 2010.

As of 2014, the band has sold over 1.4 million albums in the United States, and almost two million collectively worldwide.

== Albums ==
=== Studio albums ===
List of studio albums, with selected chart positions and certifications
Title	Album details	Peak chart positions										Sales	Certifications
Title	Album details	US	AUS	BEL (FL)	CAN	FRA	GER	IRL	NED	SCO	UK	Sales	Certifications
Turn On the Bright Lights	Released: August 20, 2002; Label: Matador; Format(s): CD, LP, download	158	— (Note: Turn On the Bright Lights did not enter the Australian ARIA Albums Chart but peaked at number four on the ARIA Hitseekers Chart.)	—	—	62	—	—	—	78	101	US: 579,000; UK: 138,000	RIAA: Gold; BPI: Gold
Antics	Released: September 28, 2004; Label: Matador; Format(s): CD, LP, 7-inch box set, download	15	21	30	16	11	47	10	34	21	21	US: 516,000	RIAA: Gold; ARIA: Gold; BEA: Gold; BPI: Gold
Our Love to Admire	Released: July 10, 2007; Label: Capitol; Format(s): CD, LP, download	4	14	3	5	19	16	1	5	3	2	US: 240,000	BPI: Silver
Interpol	Released: September 7, 2010; Label: Matador; Format(s): CD, LP, download	7	7	5	11	19	13	13	7	14	10	US: 109,000	
El Pintor	Released: September 9, 2014; Label: Matador; Format(s): CD, LP, download	7	11	11	15	18	11	6	16	10	9		
Marauder	Released: August 24, 2018; Label: Matador; Format(s): CD, LP, download	23	26	8	36	41	6	14	16	5	6		
The Other Side of Make-Believe	Released: July 15, 2022; Label: Matador; Format(s): CD, LP, download	179	74	45	—	71	8	88	42	5	14		
This Mirror Weighs a Ton	Released: August 28, 2026; Label: Partisan; Format(s): CD, LP, download	198	38	38	—	67	12	57	34	8	33		
"—" denotes albums that did not chart, or were not released in that country.

=== Remix albums ===
List of remix albums, with selected chart positions
Title	Album details	Peak chart positions	
Title	Album details	ITA	UK
El Pintor Remixes	Released: April 16, 2016; Label: Soft Limit; Format(s): LP	— (Note: El Pintor Remixes did not enter the Italian Albums Chart, but peaked at number 17 on the Italy Vinyl Albums chart.)	— (Note: El Pintor Remixes did not enter the UK Albums Chart, but peaked at number 39 on the UK Vinyl Albums chart.)
"—" denotes albums that did not chart, or were not released in that country.

=== Live albums ===
Title	Album details
Live at Third Man Records	Released: December 6, 2024; Label: Third Man Records; Format(s): Acetate disc

== Extended plays ==
List of extended plays, with selected chart positions
Title	Extended play details	Peak chart positions								
Title	Extended play details	US	US Ind.	BEL (FL)	BEL (WA)	FRA	NED	SCO	UK	UK Ind.
Fukd ID #3	Released: December 11, 2000; Label: Chemikal Underground; Format(s): CD, 12-inch vinyl	—	—	—	—	—	—	—	—	—
Precipitate	Released: 2001; Label: Self-released; Format(s): CD	—	—	—	—	—	—	—	—	—
Interpol	Released: June 4, 2002; Label: Matador; Format(s): CD, 7-inch vinyl	—	—	—	—	—	—	—	170	—
The Black EP	Released: August 26, 2003; Label: EMI; Format(s): CD	—	—	—	—	148	—	—	—	—
Interpol Remix	Released: November 22, 2005; Label: Matador; Format(s): CD, 12-inch vinyl	—	—	—	—	—	—	—	—	—
Interpol: Live in Astoria	Released: November 27, 2007; Label: Capitol; Format(s): CD	—	—	—	—	—	—	—	—	—
Try It On Remixes	Released: April 16, 2011; Label: V2; Format(s): 12-inch vinyl	—	—	—	—	—	—	—	—	—
El Pintor Bonus Tracks	Released: February 16, 2018; Label: Matador; Format(s): Download	—	—	—	—	—	—	—	—	—
A Fine Mess	Released: May 17, 2019; Label: Matador; Format(s): CD, 12-inch vinyl, download	— (Note: "A Fine Mess" did not enter the Billboard 200 chart, but peaked at number 36 on the Album Sales chart.)	10	87	51	—	— (Note: "A Fine Mess" did not enter the Dutch Album Top 100 chart, but peaked at number 31 on the Dutch Vinyl 33 chart.)	24	94	8
"—" denotes EPs that did not chart, or were not released in that country.

== Singles ==
List of singles, with selected chart positions
Title	Year	Peak chart positions										Certifications	Album
Title	Year	US Bub.	US Alt	BEL (FL)	CAN	IRL	ITA	NED	POL	SCO	UK	Certifications	Album
"PDA"	2002	—	—	—	—	—	—	—	—	—	—		Turn on the Bright Lights
"Obstacle 1"	2002	—	—	—	—	—	—	—	—	81	72		Turn on the Bright Lights
“Say Hello to the Angels" / "NYC”	2003	—	—	—	—	—	—	—	—	73	65		Turn on the Bright Lights
"Obstacle 1" (Arthur Baker Remix)	2003	—	—	—	—	—	—	—	—	53	41		Non-album singles
"Interlude" (Note: "Interlude" was released as a downloadable single in the UK only.)	2004	—	—	—	—	—	—	—	—	—	—		Non-album singles
"Slow Hands"	2004	—	15	—	—	47	44	98	—	35	36		Antics
"Evil"	2005	—	24	— (Note: "Evil" did not enter the Ultratop 50, but peaked at number 43 on the Back Catalogue Singles chart.)	—	35	—	—	—	19	18	RIAA: Gold	Antics
"C'mere"	2005	—	—	—	—	35	—	—	38	22	19		Antics
"The Heinrich Maneuver"	2007	18	11	62	96	—	—	—	—	5	31		Our Love to Admire
"Mammoth"	2007	—	—	—	—	—	—	—	—	14	44		Our Love to Admire
"Lights"	2010	—	—	—	—	—	—	—	—	—	—		Interpol
"Barricade"	2010	—	39	72	—	—	—	—	—	—	—		Interpol
"Try It On" (Note: "Try It On" was released as a limited edition single for Record Store Day in 2011.)	2011	—	—	—	—	—	—	—	—	—	— (Note: "Try It On" did not enter the UK Singles Chart, but peaked at number 60 on the UK Physical Singles Chart Top 100.)		Interpol
"All the Rage Back Home"	2014	—	26	—	—	—	—	—	37	—	—		El Pintor
"Ancient Ways"	2014	—	—	—	—	—	—	—	—	—	—		El Pintor
"Everything Is Wrong" (Note: "Everything Is Wrong" was released as a limited edition single for Record Store Day in 2015.)	2015	—	35	—	—	—	—	—	62	—	— (Note: "Everything Is Wrong" did not enter the UK Singles Chart, but peaked at number 42 on the UK Physical Chart.)		El Pintor
"The Rover"	2018	—	—	—	—	—	—	—	—	—	—		Marauder
"Number 10"	2018	—	—	—	—	—	—	—	—	—	—		Marauder
"If You Really Love Nothing"	2018	—	—	—	—	—	—	—	—	—	—		Marauder
"All at Once" (Note: "All at Once" was released as a limited edition single, with special collectors edition of Q Magazine.)	2018	—	—	—	—	—	—	—	—	—	— (Note: "All at Once" did not enter the UK Singles Chart, but peaked at number 2 on the UK Physical Chart.)		Non-album single
"Fine Mess"	2019	—	—	—	—	—	—	—	—	—	—		A Fine Mess
"The Weekend"	2019	—	—	—	—	—	—	—	—	—	—		A Fine Mess
"Toni"	2022	—	—	—	—	—	—	—	—	—	—		The Other Side of Make-Believe
"Something Changed"	2022	—	—	—	—	—	—	—	—	—	—		The Other Side of Make-Believe
"Fables"	2022	—	—	—	—	—	—	—	—	—	—		The Other Side of Make-Believe
"Gran Hotel"	2022	—	—	—	—	—	—	—	—	—	—		The Other Side of Make-Believe
"This Mirror Weighs a Ton" / "See Out Loud"	2026	—	—	—	—	—	—	—	—	—	—		This Mirror Weighs a Ton
"This Mirror Weighs a Ton" / "See Out Loud"	2026	—	27	—	—	—	—	—	—	—	—		This Mirror Weighs a Ton
"Iron City"	2026	—	—	—	—	—	—	—	—	—	—		This Mirror Weighs a Ton
"—" denotes singles that did not chart, have not charted yet, or were not released. "×" denotes periods where charts did not exist or were not archived.

=== Promotional singles ===
Title	Year	Peak chart positions		Album
Title	Year	MEX Eng.	POL	Album
"Narc"	2005	×	—	Antics
"No I in Threesome"	2007	×	—	Our Love to Admire
"Memory Serves"	2010	—	—	Interpol
"Summer Well"	2010	20	—	Interpol
"My Desire"	2014	43	53	El Pintor
"Anywhere"	2015	—	—	El Pintor
"—" denotes singles that did not chart, have not charted yet, or were not released. "×" denotes periods where charts did not exist or were not archived.

== Music videos ==
Song	Year	Director(s)
"PDA"	2002	Christopher Mills
"Obstacle 1"	2002	Floria Sigismondi
"NYC"	2003	Doug Aitken, Adam Levite
"Slow Hands"	2004	Daniel Lévi
"Evil"	2005	Charlie White
"C'mere"	2005	Associates in Science
"The Heinrich Maneuver"	2007	E. Elias Merhige
"Mammoth"	2007	Jai Stokes
"No I in Threesome"	2007	Patrick Daughters
"Rest My Chemistry"	2008	Aaron Koblin
"Lights"	2010	Charlie White
"Barricade"	2010	Moh Azima
"I Touch a Red Button Man" ("Lights")	2011	David Lynch
"All the Rage Back Home"	2014	Paul Banks, Sophia Peer
"Twice as Hard"	2014	Paul Banks
"My Desire"	2014	Markus Lundqvist
"Everything Is Wrong"	2015	Paul Banks, Carlos Puga
"The Rover"	2018	Gerardo Naranjo
"If You Really Love Nothing"	2018	Hala Matar
"Toni"	2022	Van Alpert
"Something Changed"	2022	Van Alpert
"Gran Hotel"	2022	Malia James

== Other appearances ==
Listed are songs that were not released by Interpol as stand-alone singles or on studio albums, or released prior to any Interpol release.

Song	Year	Album	Details
"Song Seven"	2000	Clooney Tunes	Later released on the Precipitate EP.
"A Time to Be So Small"	2001	This Is Next Year: A Brooklyn-Based Compilation	Later released on the Precipitate EP.
"Specialist"	2004	Music from The O.C.: Mix 2	Previously released on Interpol EP.
"Direction"	2005	Six Feet Under, Vol. 2: Everything Ends	Specially recorded song.
