= Interpol (disambiguation) =

INTERPOL is the telegraphic address for the International Criminal Police Organization (ICPO), an intergovernmental organization.

Interpol may also refer to:

- Interpol (film), a 1957 crime film directed by John Gilling
- Interpol (video game), a 2007 puzzle video game developed by TikGames
- Interpol (band), a New York City post-punk revival band
  - Interpol (album), the band's self-titled fourth studio album
  - Interpol (EP), the band's third EP release
- Short for interpolation
