= Paper Crown =

Studio album by Sam Forrest
- Released: December 28, 2009
- Recorded: The Factory of Unprofessional Sound, York, England
- Genre: singer-songwriter
- Label: Desert Mine Music
- Producer: Sam Forrest (with assistance from David Jones)

Sam Forrest chronology
Down the Hillside (2008)	Paper Crown (2009)

Paper Crown is the second solo album by Nine Black Alps front-man Sam Forrest, released December 28, 2009, on Desert Mine Music.

Prior to release, Forrest had been uploading song previews to his website, where "Say Your Prayers" appeared to be lead single.

== Track listing ==
1. "Eyes Like A River"
2. "May Queen"
3. "Never Seen The Sea"
4. "Pine Needle Floor"
5. "Mother Of Corn"
6. "Say Your Prayers"
7. "Beverley"
8. "The Great Migration"
9. "Not Enough"
10. "Salvation Army"
11. "Falling Down Again"
12. "Streetlight"
13. "Tender Loving Care"
14. "Send The Rain"
15. "Wooden Horse"
16. "King Of Flesh"
17. "Wintersong"

== Personnel ==
- Sam Forrest – vocals, guitars, bass, banjo, piano, recorder, harmonica, drums, mixing
- Hayley Hutchinson – backing vocals
- Rebecca Dumican – cello
- Stephen Ruggiero – violin
- Iain Archer – lap steel
- Dave Lynch – mastering
