= Black Sessions (disambiguation) =

Black Sessions are performances of live music broadcast on the French radio station France Inter.

Black Sessions or Black Session may also refer to:

- The Black Sessions, an album by Katatonia
- The Black Session: Paris, 10 May 2011, a live album by Wire
- Black Session: Yann Tiersen, an album by Yann Tiersen
