= Love/Hate (Nine Black Alps album) =

Studio album by Nine Black Alps
- Released: 29 October 2007
- Genres: Post-grunge, power pop
- Length: 38:08
- Label: Island
- Producer: Dave Sardy

Nine Black Alps chronology
Glitter Gulch EP (2006)	Love/Hate (2007)	Locked Out from the Inside (2009)

Professional ratings
Review scores
Source	Rating
AllMusic	3/5 stars
The Guardian	2/5 stars
Manchester Evening News	3/5 stars
NME	8/10
Rocklouder	1/5 stars
This Is Fake DIY	2.5/5 stars

Love/Hate is the second studio album by English rock band Nine Black Alps. It was recorded by Dave Sardy (Jet, Oasis) in L.A. and is the follow-up to debut album Everything Is (and Glitter Gulch EP) and was released on 29 October 2007.

This album has been described as a move towards 'pop accessibility' with more hummable tunes and a less alternative sound. Vocalist and guitarist Sam Forrest stated in an interview that this album was more about the songwriting rather than the power of the guitar.

== Track listing ==
1. "Bitter End" – 3.12
2. "Burn Faster" – 2.48
3. "Everytime I Turn" – 3.02
4. "Pet Hate" – 3.33
5. "Painless" – 3.30
6. "Future Wife" – 2.39
7. "Heavier Than Water" – 4.18
8. "Happiness And Satisfaction" – 3.23
9. "So In Love" – 2.12
10. "Forget My Name" – 3.16
11. "Under The Sun" – 3.44

All songs by Nine Black Alps.

== Singles released ==
=== Bitter End ===
This song differs from Nine Black Alps' usual fare and is driven by an acoustic guitar rather than the loud, distorted guitars that were so frequently used on their debut Everything Is.

The video was shot in Wimbledon and shows the band playing the song. There are also clips of teenagers who appear to live in the woods doing different activities throughout the video. The video was also a nominee for Best telecine in a video in the UK Music Video Awards which took place in London's West End Odeon.
