= Interpol: Live in Astoria EP =

Live

EP by Interpol
- Released: November 27, 2007
- Recorded: July 2, 2007
- Venue: The London Astoria
- Genres: Post-punk revival; indie rock
- Label: Capitol
- Producer: Interpol

Interpol chronology
Our Love to Admire (2007)	Live (2007)	Interpol (2010)

Live is the sixth EP by American rock band Interpol, and their first in two years since the Interpol Remix EP. It was recorded during a July 2, 2007 show at the London Astoria, on the European leg of their Our Love to Admire world tour, and released by Capitol on November 27, 2007.

Professional ratings
Review scores
Source	Rating
Pitchfork	(6.1/10)

== Track listing ==
All tracks are written by Interpol.

No.	Title	Length
1.	"Pioneer to the Falls"	7:40
2.	"Obstacle 1"	4:09
3.	"The Heinrich Maneuver"	3:39
4.	"Mammoth"	4:48
5.	"Rest My Chemistry"	5:11
6.	"Stella Was a Diver and She Was Always Down"	6:12

== Personnel ==
Interpol

- Paul Banks – lead vocals, guitar
- Daniel Kessler – guitar
- Carlos D – bass guitar
- Sam Fogarino – drums, percussion

Additional musician

- Dave Scher – keyboards, backing vocals

Technical personnel

- Robin Delwiche – recording
- Matt Lawrence – mixing
