= Sirens (Nine Black Alps album) =

Studio album by Nine Black Alps
- Released: 8 October 2012
- Recorded: May–September 2011, Yorkshire
- Genre: Alternative rock, indie rock, post-grunge
- Label: Brew Records
- Producer: Nine Black Alps

Nine Black Alps chronology
| Locked Out from the Inside (2009) | Sirens (2012) | Candy For The Clowns (2014) |

Singles from Shields
- 1. "My One and Only" Released: 1 October 2012

Sirens is the fourth studio album by English alternative rock band Nine Black Alps, released on 8 October 2012 on Brew Records. The album is the first to feature bassist Karl Astbury, following the departure of Martin Cohen in 2011.

== Reception ==
Professional ratings
Aggregate scores
| Source | Rating |
|---|---|
| Metacritic | 70/100 |
Review scores
| Source | Rating |
| AllMusic | 3/5 stars |
| Drowned in Sound | 6/10 |
| The Line of Best Fit | 5.5/10 |

Sirens was released to mixed reviews, with Drowned in Sound stating, "It's [the] moments, where Nine Black Alps pull away from the grunge-by-numbers template, that feel the most honest, the least posed. But the album as a whole is still so in thrall to past masters that at times it almost feels like a museum exhibit, a TV reconstruction of a real-life drama." The Line of Best Fit also gave the album a mixed review stating, "Their music is always going to struggle in a music scene where exploration and innovation are everything. Sadly, Sirens is yet more proof that they are still resisting the urge to invent. If this album achieves one thing, it proves in fleeting moments that the band do have a dark side."

== Track listing ==
1. "Be My Girl"
2. "Don't Forget to Breathe"
3. "My One and Only"
4. "Phosphorescence"
5. "Living in a Dream"
6. "Waiting Room"
7. "Hand Me Down"
8. "Penny Cinderella"
9. "Away from Me"
10. "Find It My Own Way"
11. "What You Wanted"
12. "Another World"
13. "Playing Your Song" (Japan Bonus Track)

== Personnel ==
Nine Black Alps

- Sam Forrest - vocals, guitar
- David Jones - guitar
- James Galley - drums
- Karl Astbury - bass guitar

Additional musicians

- Jim Lee Martin - additional vocals (track 2)

=== Recording personnel ===
- Nine Black Alps - producer, engineering, mixing
- Ed Woods - mastering

=== Artwork ===
- Matt Davies - artwork
- Andy Gaines - photography
