= Everything Is Wrong =

Everything Is Wrong may refer to:

- Everything Is Wrong (album), the third studio album by American electronica musician Moby, or its title song
- "Everything Is Wrong" (song), by American rock band Interpol
- "Everything Is Wrong", a song by Blonde Redhead from the album Penny Sparkle
- "Everything's Wrong", a song by Crossfade from the album Falling Away
