= The Black EP =

EP by Interpol
- Released: August 26, 2003
- Recorded: 2003
- Genres: Post-punk revival; indie rock
- Length: 29:01
- Label: EMI
- Producers: Pascal Bernard; Interpol; Peter Katis

Interpol chronology
Turn on the Bright Lights (2002)	The Black EP (2003)	Antics (2004)

Professional ratings
Review scores
Source	Rating
AllMusic	3/5 stars
Pitchfork	3.5/10
Sputnikmusic	3.0/5

The Black EP is an EP by American rock band Interpol, released in August 2003 by EMI Records. It includes "Say Hello to the Angels" (taken from their debut album, Turn on the Bright Lights), a demo version of "NYC", and four live recordings from the Black Sessions recorded on French radio station Radio France.

== Track listing ==
No.	Title	Length
1.	"Say Hello to the Angels"	4:27
2.	"NYC" (Demo)	4:28
3.	"Obstacle 1" (Black Session)	4:18
4.	"Specialist" (Black Session)	6:33
5.	"Leif Erikson" (Black Session)	3:55
6.	"PDA" (Black Session)	5:19
Total length:		29:01

== Personnel ==
Interpol

- Paul Banks – vocals, guitar
- Daniel Kessler – guitar; vocals (track 6)
- Sam Fogarino – drums
- Carlos Dengler – bass guitar; keyboards (tracks 1 and 2)

Additional Performer

- Eric Altesleben – keyboards (tracks 3–6); backing vocals (tracks 3–5)

Technical Personnel

- Peter Katis – recording, mixing (track 1)
- Sam Fogarino – recording (track 2)
- Interpol – mixing (track 2)
- Pascal Bernard – recording (tracks 3–6)
