= The Sorry Kisses =

English rock band

- Origin: York, England
- Genres: Indie rock, Alternative rock
- Years active: 2006–present
- Label: Desert Mine Music
- Members: Hayley Hutchinson; Sam Forrest; Micah Calabrese
- Past members: David Jones; Rusty Squeezebox; Robert Johnson
- Website: http://www.thesorrykisses.net/

The Sorry Kisses are an English rock band formed in 2006 around the core duo of singer-songwriter Hayley Hutchinson and Sam Forrest of Nine Black Alps.

== History ==
The project was started as an outlet for a handful of songs from Hayley Hutchinson that did not fit the acoustic style she is usually known for. They spent the next year recording on a laptop computer in a variety of locations from their base in a spare bedroom in York, England to a haunted mansion in the Hollywood Hills, to a surf shack nestled beneath the Pacific Coast Highway in California.

Whilst recording in America, The Sorry Kisses enlisted the help of a number of guest musicians to flesh out their home-made sound. Micah Calabrese, formerly of Giant Drag, plays drums on three tracks, including "Think Twice" which also features the noise guitar of David Jones of Nine Black Alps.

The band were scheduled to play their first gig as a full band on 13 December at City Screen Basement Bar in York, England, but plans were scrapped due to the lack of an available drummer, with Calabrese not able to appear.

Following the completion of their album, The Sorry Kisses have already filmed their werewolf-inspired debut video for "Running Out" in a moonlit car park and played their first set of live shows at woodland parties and in flooded basements with an ever-changing cast of band-members and malfunctioning drum machines.

On 28 April 2008, the band's debut album, Hard Drive, was released through their own Desert Mine Music label on a limited run of 100 copies, hand made by Sam and Hayley themselves. The band plan to release it digitally sometime in the near future. The album was named 'album of the week' by Manchester Music.

On 8 May 2008, the band made their first radio appearance, playing on BBC Radio York's More Raw Introducing show.

In 2009 The Sorry Kisses released their second album Um And Ah on Desert Mine Music. Like their debut album Hard Drive, it was recorded at home by Hutchinson and Forrest and was mainly inspired by their time spent in California. The first song on the album "Ventura Sunset" was featured on Nic Harcourts show on KCRW Los Angeles and the song "Abandon Ship" was used in the hit American TV series Grey's Anatomy in 2010.

2011 sees them release their third LP on Desert Mine Music called Keep Smiling. The album was recorded entirely at their own Factory of Unprofessional Sound studio in North Yorkshire. It features one time Los Angeles-based ex-Love / Baby Lemonade guitarist Rusty Squeezebox on drums. They also made a music video recently for their song "Sunstorms" which features a man forward rolling across various landscapes well over a hundred times.

The band released a new album in October of 2026, titled 'Forever in a Memory'.

== Line-up ==
- Hayley Hutchinson – Vocals/Guitar
- Sam Forrest – Bass/Guitar/Vocals
- David Jones – Noise Guitar
- Micah Calabrese – Drums
- Rusty Squeezebox – Drums
- Robert Johnson – Bass

== Discography ==
=== Albums ===
- Hard Drive (2008)
- Um And Ah (2009)
- Keep Smiling (2011)
- Social Situations (2013)
- Play Along (2015)
- Life's an Illusion (2019)
- Forever in a Memory (2026)

=== Digital EPs ===
- Battle EP (2006)

== See also ==
- List of bands from England
