= Locked Out from the Inside =

Locked out from the Inside

Studio album by Nine Black Alps
- Released: 5 October 2009
- Recorded: Bryn Derwen Studios
- Genre: Alternative rock, grunge
- Label: Lost House Records
- Producer: Dave Eringa

Nine Black Alps chronology
| Love/Hate (2007) | Locked out from the Inside (2009) | Sirens (2012) |

Singles from Locked out from the Inside
- 1. "Buy Nothing" Released: 18 May 2009

Professional ratings
Review scores
| Source | Rating |
|---|---|
| Q | 3/5 stars |
| Kerrang! | 3/5 stars |

Locked out from the Inside is the third studio album by Manchester-based alternative rock band Nine Black Alps, released on October 5, 2009. The album was released digitally with the purchase of tour tickets on August 6, 2009. The album was released on the band's own Lost House Records label.

Locked Out from the Inside was preceded by the single "Buy Nothing" (which included the only b-side "Never Wonder Why").

The album was recorded at Bryn Derwen Studios in Bethesda, Gwynedd, North Wales with producer Dave Eringa. Vocalist and guitarist Sam Forrest describes the album as:

really enjoyable and instinctive. He’s a brilliant producer who kept us thoroughly entertained and didn’t try and get us to jump through any hoops; he listened to us and helped us get the record we wanted. We spent two weeks recording it in a little studio in North Wales and it was one of my favourite experiences of being in the band: there wasn’t any stress from outside or any expectations to sell a million records.

== Track listing ==
1. "Vampire In The Sun"
2. "Salt Water"
3. "Every Photograph Steals Your Soul"
4. "Cold Star"
5. "Bay of Angels"
6. "Porcupine"
7. "Full Moon Summer"
8. "Silence Kills"
9. "Buy Nothing"
10. "Along For The Ride"
11. "Ghost In The City"
