= Interpol (EP) =

EP by Interpol
- Released: June 4, 2002
- Recorded: November 2001
- Studio: Tarquin (Bridgeport, Connecticut)
- Genres: Indie rock; post-punk revival
- Length: 16:01
- Label: Matador
- Producer: Interpol

Interpol chronology
Precipitate EP (2001)	Interpol (2002)	Turn On the Bright Lights (2002)

Professional ratings
Review scores
Source	Rating
AllMusic	4/5 stars
Pitchfork	9.3/10
PopMatters	positive
Stylus	B

Interpol is the third extended play (EP) by American rock band Interpol. It was released on June 4, 2002, and was the band's first release on the Matador Records label.

== Background ==
"PDA" is one of the oldest songs by Interpol and appeared on many of their early demos and EPs (including their first demo tape, the Fukd ID #3 EP and the Precipitate EP).

The same versions of "PDA" and "NYC" were later included on the band's first full-length, Turn On the Bright Lights, while "Specialist" was released as a bonus track on the album's 2005 reissue.

== Release ==
Between the releases of the Interpol EP and Turn On the Bright Lights, Interpol released "PDA" as a promo single along with a music video directed by Christopher Mills.

The EP was originally made available for sale for $3.98 on Matador's website.

== Reception ==
Interpol received much critical acclaim, and garnered the band a healthy amount of attention before the release of Turn On the Bright Lights. The EP also helped the band shed accusations of cloning early post-punk bands like Joy Division, establishing an individual sound that expanded upon rather than copied the band's influences.

From start to finish, Interpol's EP in preparation for their first full-length effort is vast, moving, and brilliant. Each listen reveals new layers, the band's appeal growing exponentially. The only complaint that can be leveled at this disc is that it's just too short, which in itself fulfills the first law of show business: always leave them wanting more. At this early stage, it's hard to know whether or not the success of this EP is based on the premise that these are simply the best songs Interpol has to offer. But if the boys can eke out a bargain with Old Scratch himself and pour thirty more minutes of sweet nectar like this into a few billion ones and zeros, their souls would certainly be a small price to pay.

— Eric Carr, in his Pitchfork review.

Treble magazine rated the EP the 39th best single of the decade.

"PDA" was nominated for a MTV2 award in 2003 and is a playable track on Rock Band 2.

== Track listing ==
All tracks are written by Paul Banks, Daniel Kessler, Carlos Dengler and Sam Fogarino.

No.	Title	Length
1.	"PDA"	5:02
2.	"NYC"	4:20
3.	"Specialist"	6:39
Total length:		16:01

== Personnel ==
Interpol

- Paul Banks – vocals, guitar
- Daniel Kessler – guitar, vocals on "PDA"
- Carlos D – bass guitar, keyboards
- Sam Fogarino – drums, percussion

Technical personnel

- Peter Katis – recording, mixing on "PDA"
- Gareth Jones – mixing (all except "PDA")
- Christian Schaal – photos
