= Black Sessions =

Live performances on the radio station France Inter

Black Sessions are performances of live music broadcast on the French radio station France Inter. They are recorded in front of a live audience and feature on the C'est Lenoir show. The name is a pun based on the name of their creator, Bernard Lenoir, translated literally as "Bernard the black"

The first performance was in 1992 and since then many French and international artists have performed Black sessions including:

- Arctic Monkeys
- Band of Horses
- Beirut
- Belle & Sebastian
- Belly
- Bonnie 'Prince' Billy
- Andrew Bird
- Bloc Party
- The Boo Radleys
- Broadcast
- Calexico (Session no. 163; recorded live at studio 105 May 22, 2000)
- Nick Cave
- The Cardigans
- Catatonia
- Chumbawamba (21 October 1994)
- Clap Your Hands Say Yeah
- CocoRosie
- Cocteau Twins
- The Cure
- Death in Vegas (21 October 1999)
- The Divine Comedy
- Dinosaur Jr (March 2nd 1993)
- Drugstore
- Echobelly (21 October 1994)
- Editors
- Eels
- Elbow
- Emilie Simon
- Field Music
- Feist
- Franz Ferdinand (recorded 2005)
- Goldfrapp
- Grandaddy
- Guillemots
- Gumball (May 26, 1993)
- Gemma Hayes
- The House of Love (Session no.6; recorded May 6, 1992)
- Interpol (Interpol released The Black EP which featured a number of tracks from their 2002 Black Session)
- Klaxons
- Lloyd Cole (1993 [covered Bob Dylan's "It's All Over Now, Baby Blue"], 1995)
- Los Campesinos!
- Lush (*01147 - Session no. 55; recorded live at studio 105 June 28, 1994 Paris, France)
- Madrugada (Session no. 159; recorded live at studio 105 April 3, 2000)
- Mazzy Star (1993-10-25)
- Mojave 3 (in their first public performance)
- Morphine
- The National
- Nine Black Alps (the Glitter Gulch EP released by Nine Black Alps contains "Coldhearted", the song performed on their Black Session)
- Pavement
- Placebo (band)
- The Posies (1 March 1994)
- Pulp
- Radiohead
- The Raveonettes
- Ride
- The Rentals
- Röyksopp (with a power-out goof at the beginning)
- Sleeper (8 March 1994 - bassist Diid Osman fell over onstage, as recounted in singer Louise Wener's memoir Different For Girls)
- The Shins
- The Smashing Pumpkins
- Smoke City
- Sparklehorse (Session no. 250; recorded September 25, 2006)
- Suede (recorded October 4, 1996)
- The Sundays
- Teenage Fanclub
- Yann Tiersen (2 December 1998, and released as Black Session: Yann Tiersen by Ici, d'ailleurs... on 2 November 1999)
- Throwing Muses
- These New Puritans
- The Verve
- Rufus Wainwright
- The Wedding Present
- Paul Weller (October 16, 1992)
- Weezer
- Wire - released as the album The Black Session: Paris, 10 May 2011
- The Wombats
