= Down the Hillside =

Studio album by Sam Forrest
- Released: 29 September 2008
- Recorded: Sam's house, York, England
- Genre: singer-songwriter
- Label: Desert Mine Music
- Producer: Sam Forrest

Sam Forrest chronology
Down the Hillside (2008)	Paper Crown (2009)

Down the Hillside is the debut solo album by Nine Black Alps front-man Sam Forrest, released 29 September 2008 on Desert Mine Music. Only 1000 copies of the album were produced, each of them individually numbered.

In January 2010, Forrest noted that "Down the Hillside was a collection of songs I had that didn’t really fit the Nine Black Alps mould."

== Track listing ==
1. "Down the Hillside"
2. "Heart of the Winter"
3. "River Bed"
4. "In the Garden"
5. "You're Gonna Be Lonely"
6. "In My Picture"
7. "Now That I Found You"
8. "Ivory Tower"
9. "Lost and Left Behind"
10. "Can't Take You Anywhere"
11. "On the Way Down"

== Personnel ==
- Sam Forrest – vocals, guitar, bass, production, mixing
- Hayley Hutchinson – backing vocals
- Alan Leach – drums
- Iain Archer – mixing
- Dave Lynch – mastering
