= Glitter Gulch EP =

EP by Nine Black Alps
- Released: 15 March 2006
- Genre: Alternative rock, indie rock
- Length: 17:30
- Label: Island

Nine Black Alps chronology
Everything Is (2005)	Glitter Gulch EP (2006)	Love/Hate (2007)

Professional ratings
Review scores
Source	Rating
Drowned In Sound	5/10 stars
Gigwise	2/5 stars
IndieLondon	4/5 stars

Glitter Gulch EP is an EP released by English band Nine Black Alps in 2006 on Island Records. These are all B-sides for the singles released from their debut album, Everything Is, except for "Coldhearted" which is a Black session recording.

== Track listing ==
1. "Over the Ocean" – 2:20 ("Cosmopolitan" b-side)
2. "Ilana Song" – 2:31 ("Shot Down" b-side)
3. "Attraction" – 3:04 ("Shot Down" b-side)
4. "String Me Along" – 3:15 ("Not Everyone" b-side)
5. "Never Coming Down (Live)" – 3:59 ("Just Friends" b-side)
6. "Coldhearted (Live)" – 2:20 (Live Black session)

== Written inside the album cover ==
"Hello?

How are you? I know. I feel the same. But anyway we haven't spoken in a while so i thought i should write and say 'hi'. Hi. I never really know how to write letters, so i decided to make you a mix CD instead. Read into the songs whatever you want. But remember that these songs are chosen with no common theme or meaning, And any resemblance to anybody, living or dead, is entirely coincidental.

The first two songs are both ugly ducklings.

And both are words of fiction.

The three songs following all feature acoustic Guitars. Again, this stands for as much as what it stands against.

The last song is a kind of runners-up prize. A raw consolation halfway out of studio habitat.

Anyway, i hope i haven't bored you too much with this. I just wanted to keep in touch.

Say hello to everyone for me

love

Nine Black Alps"
