= Try It On =

EP by Interpol
- Released: April 16, 2011
- Labels: Soft Limit (UK); Matador (US)
- Producer: Interpol

Interpol chronology
| Interpol (2010) | Try It On (2011) | El Pintor (2014) |

Try It On is the seventh EP and second remix EP by American rock band Interpol. Consisting of three remixes of "Try It On" (by Salem, Banjo or Freakout, and Ikonika), it was originally released on 12" red vinyl in Europe by Soft Limit in celebration of Record Store Day on April 16, 2011. The EP was limited to 300 copies.

Matador Records issued the 12" EP in the United States on July 12, 2011. On the same day, Soft Limit released a digital edition in Europe, this time including a fourth remix, ("The Undoing"), by Irish artist Moths, who was later renamed MMOTHS.

== Track listing ==
=== 12" vinyl ===
1. "Try It On (SALEM Rmx)" – 4:08
2. "Try It On (Banjo or Freakout Rmx)" – 4:50
3. "Try It On (Ikonika Rmx)" – 4:24

=== Digital ===
1. "Try It On (SALEM Rmx)" – 4:08
2. "Try It On (Banjo or Freakout Rmx)" – 4:50
3. "Try It On (Ikonika Rmx)" – 4:24
4. "The Undoing (Moths Rmx)" – 4:06

== Charts ==
| Chart (2011) | Peak position |
|---|---|
| Mexico Ingles Airplay (Billboard) | 42 |
| UK Physical Singles Chart (Official Charts Company) | 60 |

== Release details ==
| Country | Date | Label | Format | Catalog |
|---|---|---|---|---|
| Europe | April 16, 2011 | Soft Limit | 12" | VVR768435 |
| Europe | July 12, 2011 | Soft Limit | Digital | |
| United States | July 12, 2011 | Matador | 12" | OLE-957-1 |
