= Candy for the Clowns =

Studio album by Nine Black Alps
- Released: 6 May 2014
- Genres: Alternative rock, post-grunge
- Length: 35:51
- Label: Hatch
- Producer: Nine Black Alps

Nine Black Alps chronology
Sirens (2012)	Candy for the Clowns (2014)

Professional ratings
Aggregate scores
Source	Rating
Metacritic	63/100
Review scores
Source	Rating
Drowned in Sound	(7/10)
Allmusic	3/5 stars
DEAD PRESS!	7/10 stars

Candy For The Clowns is the fifth and final studio album from British rock band Nine Black Alps. It was released in May 2014 under Hatch Records.

== Track list ==
No.	Title	Length
1.	"Novokaine"	3:50
2.	"Blackout"	3:39
3.	"Supermarket Clothes"	3:00
4.	"Patti"	4:02
5.	"Something Else"	2:34
6.	"Morning After"	3:31
7.	"Come Back Around"	2:42
8.	"Not in My Name"	2:19
9.	"Destroy Me"	2:58
10.	"Take Me Underground"	3:40
11.	"Clown"	3:36
Total length:		35:51
