= The Black Session: Paris, 10 May 2011 =

Live album by Wire
- Released: 7 February 2012
- Recorded: 10 May 2011
- Venue: Studio 105, Maison de Radio France, Paris, France
- Genre: Alternative rock; post-punk; experimental rock
- Length: 63:32
- Label: Pinkflag

Wire live album chronology
Legal Bootleg Series: 02 May 2000 Great American, San Francisco (2011)	The Black Session: Paris, 10 May 2011 (2012)	Legal Bootleg Series: Set 2 – 23 February 2000 Nottingham Social (Recycling Sherwood Forest) (2013)

Professional ratings
Aggregate scores
Source	Rating
Metacritic	70/100
Review scores
Source	Rating
AllMusic	3/5 stars
BBC Music	(favorable)
Consequence of Sound	3/5 stars
The Independent	3/5 stars
Pitchfork	6.3/10
Uncut	4/5 stars

The Black Session: Paris, 10 May 2011 is a live album by English rock band Wire, released on 7 February 2012 through the band's own label, Pinkflag.

== Background ==
The album was recorded for the Black Sessions, named for the series of radio broadcasts hosted by Bernard Lenoir for French radio station France Inter and featured on the C'est Lenoir show. The name is a pun based on Bernard Lenoir's name, translated literally as "Bernard the black". Recorded at the radio station's Paris studios on 10 May 2011, Wire performed in front of an invited audience.

The Black Session focuses on tracks from Wire's latest album Red Barked Tree from 2011 but also includes songs from the 1970s and 1980s, as well as "Comet" from 2002's Read & Burn 01 EP. It is the first Wire album to feature touring guitarist Matthew Simms, who would become a permanent member in 2012. The album was initially available as an exclusive tour item during Wire's 2011 UK autumn dates, but was released worldwide in February 2012.

== Track listing ==
All tracks are written by Robert Grey, Graham Lewis and Colin Newman, except where noted.

No.	Title	Writer(s)	Length
1.	"Adapt"		4:01
2.	"Comet"	Bruce Gilbert, Grey, Lewis, Newman	2:58
3.	"Smash"		3:39
4.	"Please Take"		4:24
5.	"Kidney Bingos"	Gilbert, Grey, Lewis, Newman	4:33
6.	"Clay"		3:16
7.	"Map Ref. 41°N 93°W"	Lewis, Newman	4:22
8.	"Moreover"		3:43
9.	"Two People in a Room"	Gilbert, Newman	3:03
10.	"Down to This"		6:45
11.	"Drill"	Gilbert, Grey, Lewis, Newman	4:31
12.	"Red Barked Trees"		7:40
13.	"Pink Flag"	Lewis, Newman	10:48

== Personnel ==
Wire

- Robert Grey – drums
- Graham Lewis – bass, vocals
- Colin Newman – guitar, vocals
- Matthew Simms – guitar

Production

- Rémi Fessart – engineering, mixing
- Denis Blackham – mastering
- Jon Wozencroft – design, photography
