= PDA (Interpol song) =

2002 single by Interpol

Single by Interpol

from the album Turn on the Bright Lights
- B-side: "Specialist"
- Released: August 22, 2002
- Recorded: November 2001
- Studio: Tarquin (Bridgeport, CT)
- Length: 5:01
- Label: Matador
- Songwriters: Paul Banks; Carlos Dengler; Sam Fogarino; Daniel Kessler
- Producers: Gareth Jones; Peter Katis

Interpol singles chronology
"PDA" (2002)	"Obstacle 1" (2002)

"PDA" is the debut single by American rock band Interpol. It was released on August 22, 2002 as the first single from their debut studio album, Turn on the Bright Lights. The music video for "PDA" was directed by Christopher Mills. Unlike the two singles that followed; "Obstacle 1" and "Say Hello to the Angels" / "NYC", "PDA" did not chart.

The song was nominated for a MTV2 award in 2003. The song is one of the oldest songs by Interpol and appeared on many of their early demos and EPs such as the band's first demo tape, the Fukd ID #3 EP, the Precipitate EP and the Interpol EP.

== Music video ==
The music video for "PDA" was directed by Christopher Mills.

== Reception ==
"PDA" was nominated for a MTV2 award in 2003 and is a playable track on Rock Band 2.

== Track listing ==
7" vinyl (OLE 546-7):

1. "PDA" – 5:01
2. "Specialist" – 6:40

Promo CD:

1. "PDA" (radio edit) – 3:10
