= A Fine Mess (EP) =

EP by Interpol
- Released: May 17, 2019
- Recorded: December 6, 2017 – April 18, 2018
- Studio: Tarbox Road (Cassadaga, New York)
- Genres: Indie rock; post-punk revival
- Length: 17:45
- Label: Matador
- Producer: Dave Fridmann

Interpol chronology
Marauder (2018)	A Fine Mess (2019)	The Other Side of Make-Believe (2022)

Singles from A Fine Mess
- 1. "Fine Mess" Released: January 30, 2019; 2. "The Weekend" Released: March 28, 2019

A Fine Mess is the eighth extended play by American rock band Interpol. It was released on May 17, 2019, through Matador Records. It contains five songs that were recorded during the sessions for their previous studio album, Marauder (2018), but did not make its final cut. Like Marauder, A Fine Mess was produced by Dave Fridmann, while the song "Fine Mess" received additional production from Kaines and Tom A. D. The song "Real Life" was first performed live during their Turn On the Bright Lights XV anniversary tour in 2017. "Fine Mess" and "The Weekend" were released as singles prior to the EP's release.

== Critical reception ==
Professional ratings
Aggregate scores
Source	Rating
Metacritic	59/100
Review scores
Source	Rating
AllMusic	3/5 stars
Paste	6/10
Pitchfork	5.6/10

A Fine Mess was met with mixed or average reviews from critics. At Metacritic, which assigns a weighted average rating out of 100 to reviews from mainstream publications, this release received an average score of 59, based on 6 reviews.

== Track listing ==
All tracks are written by Interpol.

A Fine Mess track listing
No.	Title	Length
1.	"Fine Mess"	3:15
2.	"No Big Deal"	3:49
3.	"Real Life"	4:26
4.	"The Weekend"	3:03
5.	"Thrones"	3:12
Total length:		17:45

== Personnel ==
Personnel taken from A Fine Mess liner notes.

Interpol

- Daniel Kessler
- Paul Banks
- Sam Fogarino

Additional musicians

- Michael Spearman – additional rhythm on "Fine Mess"
- Roger Joseph Manning Jr. – keyboards on "Fine Mess" and "No Big Deal"
- Brandon Curtis – keyboards on "Real Life", additional vocals on "Fine Mess"

Production

- Dave Fridmann – production, recording, mixing
- Michael Fridmann – assistant engineer
- Kaines & Tom A.D. – additional production on "Fine Mess"
- Claudius Mittendorfer – mixing
- Greg Calbi – mastering

Design

- Matt de Jong – artwork
- Jamie-James Medina – artwork
- Kalpesh Lathigra – photography

== Charts ==
Chart performance for A Fine Mess
Chart (2019)	Peak position
Belgian Albums (Ultratop Flanders)	87
Belgian Albums (Ultratop Wallonia)	51
Scottish Albums (Official Charts)	24
UK Albums (Official Charts)	94
UK Independent Albums (Official Charts)	8
US Top Album Sales (Billboard)	36
