= Everything Is (album) =

Studio album by Nine Black Alps
- Released: 13 June 2005
- Recorded: Studio 3, Soundset Sound, LA.; Sam Forrest's flat, Manchester (Intermission)
- Genre: Alternative rock; post-grunge; grunge
- Length: 35:32
- Label: Island
- Producer: Rob Schnapf

Nine Black Alps chronology
Everything Is (2005)	Glitter Gulch EP (2006)

Professional ratings
Aggregate scores
Source	Rating
Metacritic	68/100
Review scores
Source	Rating
AllMusic	3.5/5 stars
Drowned in Sound	5/10 stars
The Guardian	3/5 stars

Everything Is is the debut album by English rock band Nine Black Alps released on 13 June 2005 under Island Records. The album generally received favourable reviews among critics, and heralded acclaim from portions of the British music press, earning the band a loyal fanbase following in the United Kingdom.

Five singles were released from the album; "Cosmopolitan," "Shot Down," "Not Everyone," "Unsatisfied" and "Just Friends".

== Track listing ==
No.	Title	Length
1.	"Get Your Guns"	3:35
2.	"Cosmopolitan"	2:35
3.	"Not Everyone"	3:24
4.	"Unsatisfied"	3:10
5.	"Headlights"	2:44
6.	"Behind Your Eyes"	2:51
7.	"Ironside"	2:46
8.	"Shot Down"	2:55
9.	"Just Friends"	2:15
10.	"Everybody Is" (omitted from non-UK pressings)	2:37
11.	"Intermission"	3:05
12.	"Southern Cross"	3:35

== Popular culture ==
- "Unsatisfied" was featured in episode 20 of the third season of the television series One Tree Hill.
- "Shot Down" appeared in the video games Burnout Revenge, Burnout Legends and SSX on Tour in 2005.
- "Cosmopolitan" is featured on FlatOut 2, FIFA 06 and Madden NFL 06
- "Not Everyone" appeared on Midnight Club 3: DUB Edition Remix.

== Personnel ==
Nine Black Alps

- Sam Forrest – vocals, guitar
- David Jones – bass, guitar
- Martin Cohen – bass, guitar
- James Galley – drums, percussion

Additional personnel

- Rob Schnapf – production
- Adam Noble – assistant engineering
- Bill Mims – assistant engineering
- Howie Weinberg – mastering (tracks 6, 10 and 11)
- Ted Jensen – mastering
- Rich Costey – mixing
- Claudius Mittendorger – assistant mixing

== Chart positions ==
Chart	Peak position
UK Charts	51
US Heatseekers	19
