= Marauder (Interpol album) =

Studio album by Interpol
- Released: August 24, 2018
- Recorded: December 6, 2017 – April 18, 2018
- Studio: Tarbox Road (Cassadaga, New York)
- Genres: Indie rock; post-punk revival
- Length: 44:19
- Label: Matador
- Producer: Dave Fridmann

Interpol chronology
El Pintor (2014)	Marauder (2018)	A Fine Mess (2019)

Singles from Marauder
- 1. "The Rover" Released: June 7, 2018; 2. "Number 10" Released: July 30, 2018; 3. "If You Really Love Nothing" Released: August 23, 2018

Marauder is the sixth studio album by American rock band Interpol. It was released on August 24, 2018, by Matador Records. The album was produced by Dave Fridmann and recorded at his studio, Tarbox Road, in Cassadaga, New York from December 6, 2017 through April 18, 2018.

Three singles were released from the album: "The Rover" on June 7, "Number 10" on July 30, and "If You Really Love Nothing" on August 23.

== Background ==
Interpol singer and guitarist Paul Banks revealed in a September 2016 Beats 1 interview that the band would resume writing music in the fall of 2016. They later began holding rehearsal sessions in October. In January 2017, they officially announced that their sixth studio album would be released in 2018 on Matador Records. They took a break from recording the album later in the year so they could commence the anniversary tour for their 2002 debut album, Turn on the Bright Lights. The tour lasted from August to October 2017. They resumed work on the album afterward. In May 2018, it was revealed by the band that the album was in its mastering stage.

During the anniversary tour for Turn on the Bright Lights in late 2017 the band included the song "Real Life" in their encore setlist. Although it was the first song written for the album, the song wasn't included in the final cut. On May 24, 2018, the name of the album was leaked by Pitchfork when it was accidentally included in their list "The Pitchfork Guide to New Albums: Summer 2018". The album's listing was subsequently removed. In June, the band began posting a set of cryptic images on social media. One of the images featured a mural with coordinates printed on it, with the image being captioned "maybe it's time"; these coordinates would lead to Mexico City. They also posted a link to an RSVP page for an event in Mexico City taking place on June 7 at 9:30 a.m. and 11:30 a.m. CDT.

Fridmann insisted on recording Marauder on two-inch tape, a rarity for modern albums, most of which are recorded digitally. Fridmann said: "It's a very different mentality as a musician, when you need to nail the take instead of asking the producer to fix it later." Guitarist Daniel Kessler said: "We liked that we weren't being overly precious with making the perfect guitar take. It was a raw record-making experience."

== Release ==
The album was released on August 24, 2018. Music videos were shot for two of the three singles: "The Rover" and "If You Really Love Nothing". The music video for "The Rover" was directed by Gerardo Naranjo and was shot on location in Mexico City over the course of four days. The music video depicts the titular character as he attracts his first followers and begins to build a cult. The music video for "If You Really Love Nothing" was simpler, directed by Hala Matar and starring Kristen Stewart and Finn Wittrock. It was shot at a nightclub in Los Angeles and follows a young woman as she interacts with people in the club and steals items.

The album's cover art features a photo of the former U.S. attorney general Elliot Richardson taken by photographer Garry Winogrand. Banks explained the choice of image in an interview, referring to Richardson as a heroic figure, with the photo reflecting both the strength and isolation of the protagonist.

== Critical reception ==
Professional ratings
Aggregate scores
Source	Rating
AnyDecentMusic?	7.0/10
Metacritic	73/100
Review scores
Source	Rating
AllMusic	4/5 stars
The A.V. Club	B
The Guardian	4/5 stars
The Independent	4/5 stars
Mojo	4/5 stars
NME	4/5 stars
Pitchfork	6.1/10
Q	4/5 stars
Rolling Stone	2.5/5 stars
Uncut	6/10

Marauder received positive reviews from critics. On review aggregator site Metacritic, the album holds an average critic score of 73 out of 100, based on 25 reviews. A preview article in Q said that the album was "a continuation of the trio's ever-so-subtle shape-shifting, each new LP adding a fresh dynamic coat to their atmospheric indie-rock". The album was heavily criticized for its production, however, with Ian Cohen of Pitchfork saying, "[The] new producer doesn’t help energize their increasingly frozen-in-time sound."

=== Accolades ===
The album was included in several best-albums-of-2018 year-end lists: #11 in Q's, #21 in Rough Trade's, #33 in Fopp's, #39 in The Independent's, #44 in Uproxx's, and #100 in NME's.

== Track listing ==
All tracks are written by Interpol (Paul Banks, Sam Fogarino, Daniel Kessler).

Marauder track listing
No.	Title	Length
1.	"If You Really Love Nothing"	4:25
2.	"The Rover"	3:37
3.	"Complications"	3:54
4.	"Flight of Fancy"	3:51
5.	"Stay in Touch"	4:53
6.	"Interlude 1"	1:01
7.	"Mountain Child"	3:08
8.	"NYSMAW"	3:16
9.	"Surveillance"	4:13
10.	"Number 10"	3:12
11.	"Party's Over"	3:39
12.	"Interlude 2"	1:03
13.	"It Probably Matters"	4:07
Total length:		44:19

Japanese bonus track
No.	Title	Length
14.	"Number 11"	3:11
Total length:		47:30

== Personnel ==
Personnel adapted from album credits.

Interpol

- Paul Banks
- Daniel Kessler
- Sam Fogarino

Additional musicians

- Brandon Curtis – keyboards on "The Rover", "Complications", "Flight of Fancy" and "Party's Over"
- Roger Joseph Manning Jr. – keyboards on "Surveillance" and "It Probably Matters"

Production

- Dave Fridmann – production, recording, mixing
- Michael Fridmann – assistant engineer
- Greg Calbi – mastering

Artwork

- Matt de Jong – artwork
- Jamie-James Medina – artwork, back photography
- Elliot Richardson – cover art subject
- Garry Winogrand – cover art photography

== Charts ==
Chart performance for Marauder
Chart (2018)	Peak position
Australian Albums (ARIA)	26
Austrian Albums (Ö3 Austria)	18
Belgian Albums (Ultratop Flanders)	8
Belgian Albums (Ultratop Wallonia)	6
Canadian Albums (Billboard)	36
Dutch Albums (Album Top 100)	16
Finnish Physical Albums (Suomen virallinen lista)	5
German Albums (Offizielle Top 100)	6
Irish Albums (Official Charts)	14
Italian Albums (FIMI)	22
Portuguese Albums (AFP)	10
Scottish Albums (Official Charts)	5
Spanish Albums (Promusicae)	6
Swedish Vinyl Albums (Sverigetopplistan)	5
Swiss Albums (Schweizer Hitparade)	13
UK Albums (Official Charts)	6
UK Independent Albums (Official Charts)	1
US Billboard 200	23
US Independent Albums (Billboard)	4
US Top Alternative Albums (Billboard)	3
US Top Rock Albums (Billboard)	3
US Indie Store Album Sales (Billboard)	2

== Release history ==
Release history and formats for Marauder
Region	Date	Format	Label	Catalog no.
Various	August 24, 2018	CD	Matador	OLE-1124-2
Various	August 24, 2018	12-inch vinyl (standard edition)	Matador	OLE-1124-1
Various	August 24, 2018	12-inch vinyl (indie store exclusive)	Matador	OLE-1124-0
Various	August 24, 2018	12-inch vinyl (Matador store exclusive)	Matador	OLE-1124-8
Various	August 24, 2018	Download; streaming	Matador	OLE-1124-6
