= The Rover (Interpol song) =

Single by Interpol

from the album Marauder
- Released: June 7, 2018
- Recorded: 2017
- Genre: Alternative rock; indie rock; post-punk revival
- Length: 3:38
- Label: Matador
- Songwriters: Paul Banks; Sam Fogarino; Daniel Kessler
- Producer: Interpol

Interpol singles chronology
| "Everything Is Wrong" (2015) | "The Rover" (2018) | "Number 10" (2018) |

Music video
- "The Rover" on YouTube

"The Rover" is a song by American rock band Interpol. It is the first track and the lead single from the band's sixth studio album, Marauder (2018) and was digitally released on June 7, 2018. Self-produced and written by the band, the song debuted and peaked at No. 35 on the Mexico Ingles Airplay.

== Music video ==
The official music video for "The Rover" was released on July 11, 2018. The music video was directed by Gerardo Naranjo with assistance from Ebon Moss-Bachrach, Paul Banks, Daniel Kessler, Sam Fogarino, Samantha Menchaca, Fermin Diaz, Diego Gamaliel, and Romina Soriano.

Erin Vanderhoof of Vanity Fair described the music video as a "political love letter to Mexico City". Vanderhoof specifically referenced Interpol frontman, Paul Banks, deciding to film the music video in Mexico City and living his teenage years there. In describing the video and sights, Banks told Vanity Fair "I think someone that I went to school with did college radio there. When we took off, he said, ‘They’re from here, in a sense, they’re one of ours'. If they like you, they put their heart into you, their enthusiasm. It’s a special market in that sense."

Throughout the music video, Moss-Bachrach plays a "mysterious figure" that follows the band around Mexico City. Emma Kay writing for PromoNews described Moss-Bacharch's performance as "Part drama, part-documentary, part-fever dream" and that the video "channels the grand tradition of cinéma vérité, with [Moss-Bachrach] as a charismatic wild man who undergoes an ecstatic psychedelic conversion on the streets of Mexico City."

== Charts ==
| Chart (2018) | Peak position |
|---|---|
| Mexico Ingles Airplay (Billboard) | 35 |
