= Hayley Hutchinson =

- Born: 1981 (age 44–45)
- Origin: Northumberland, England
- Genres: Folk, acoustic rock
- Occupations: Singer-songwriter, musician, Illustrator
- Instruments: Vocals, guitar
- Years active: late 1990s—present
- Labels: Gut, HayLo Media, Desert Mine Music

Hayley Hutchinson (born 1981 in Northumberland) is an English folk/acoustic rock singer and freelance illustrator from the Yorkshire Wolds. She has released four solo albums and also co-fronts The Sorry Kisses with Nine Black Alps frontman Sam Forrest.

== Biography ==
Hutchinson is the daughter of John Hutchinson, who played with David Bowie in the 1960s and in the 1970s as one of the 'Spiders From Mars'. She grew up in Scotland and moved to York in her teens.

Her music has been praised by BBC Radio 1's OneMusic, Bob Harris, and David Bowie, as well as receiving regular airplay on BBC Radio 2, particularly from Terry Wogan.

After a single, "Here's The Love", her first album, Independently Blue was produced by Fraser Smith and recorded in a York studio in less than a week.

A second album, Love Songs for the Enemy, followed in 2008. It was recorded in winter in the German Black Forest and was produced by Hayley Hutchinson and singer-songwriter Iain Archer. It also features musicians Sam Forrest, Iain Archer and Miriam Kaufmann. All songs were written by Hutchinson.

She has performed at several major festivals, including the Big Session, Summer Sundae, and South by Southwest in Texas in 2006, and Glastonbury in 2007.

Hutchinson is also a member of The Sorry Kisses and Howling Sludge along with Sam Forrest of Nine Black Alps.

She co-wrote and recorded the song "Pocket Full of Stars" with Nine Black Alps for the soundtrack of the Academy Award-nominated film Surf's Up.

In 2009, her band The Sorry Kisses released their second album Um And Ah with tracks being featured on Nic Harcourt's show on KCRW Los Angeles. Her song "Abandon Ship" was featured on the hit American TV show Grey's Anatomy in 2010.

Her third solo album, Ghosts in the Trees, was released in 2010 on Desert Mine Music. It was written by her Sorry Kisses bandmate Sam Forrest and also features a cover version of Françoise Hardy's "Tous Les Garcons Et Les Filles". Hutchinson produced and recorded the album at her home in the Yorkshire Wolds.

Hutchinson continues to play solo and with her band and also features on albums by the likes of Benjamin Francis Leftwich, Keegan Snaize, and Sam Forrest. She is also a freelance Illustrator, mainly focusing on children's book illustrations and fashion illustrations which go under the name The Art Hutch.

She wrote her first film soundtrack with Sam Forrest for the independent film Crimefighters, which was premiered at the Edinburgh Film Festival in 2010.

In 2011, Hutchinson continued working with her band The Sorry Kisses, releasing their third album Keep Smiling on their own Desert Mine Music label, followed by the first release on vinyl of The Sorry Kisses album Social Situations in 2013.

She contributed some vocals and toplines to Tim Green's track "Helpless Sun", which was released on My Favorite Robot Records in May 2014.

== Discography ==
=== Singles, EPs ===
- "Here's The Love" (2005), Gut
- "Independently Blue" (2005), Gut
- Held to Ransom EP (2006), Haylo Media

=== Albums ===
- Independently Blue (2005), Gut
- Love Songs for the Enemy (2008), Desert Mine Music
- Ghosts in the Trees (2010), Desert Mine Music
- Hawks to the Wind (2011), Desert Mine Music

=== Guest appearances ===
- Benjamin Francis Leftwich – Last Smoke Before The Snowstorm (2011), Dirty Hit
- Tim Green – "Helpless Sun" (2014), My Favorite Robot Records
