= Our Love to Admire =

Studio album by Interpol
- Released: July 10, 2007
- Recorded: November 2006 – May 2007
- Studios: Electric Lady (New York City); Magic Shop (New York City)
- Genres: Indie rock; post-punk revival
- Length: 47:05
- Labels: Capitol; Parlophone
- Producers: Interpol; Rich Costey

Interpol chronology
Interpol Remix (2005)	Our Love to Admire (2007)	Interpol: Live in Astoria EP (2007)

Deluxe edition cover

Singles from Our Love to Admire
- 1. "The Heinrich Maneuver" Released: May 7, 2007; 2. "Mammoth" Released: September 3, 2007

Our Love to Admire is the third studio album by American rock band Interpol, released on July 10, 2007, through Capitol Records and Parlophone. Recorded at Electric Lady Studios in Greenwich Village and the Magic Shop in New York City, Our Love to Admire is the group's first and, as of 2026, the only album to be released on a major label as they had departed from Matador Records beforehand. On April 25, 2007, the band officially announced the album title as Our Love to Admire as well as the track listing. The first single off the new album, "The Heinrich Maneuver", was released on May 7, 2007.

Our Love to Admire was largely well-received; however, the album's elaborate musical arrangement polarized some critics, since it was such a departure from the relatively simple sound the band had been known for on previous albums. The album was re-released with a bonus DVD in the UK and Mexico on November 19, 2007, featuring music videos for "The Heinrich Maneuver" and "No I in Threesome" as well as live performances from the Astoria. Paul Banks would later state that Our Love to Admire was the worst experience the band ever had working on an album, owing largely to the pressure and stress of working with a major label. Following the album's release, Interpol returned to Matador.

== Background and recording ==
Since Interpol's contract with Matador had expired, it was initially speculated that Interpol would sign with Interscope Records. However, Sam Fogarino rejected these claims as "pure speculation". It was later confirmed that the band would sign to a major label, though they chose Capitol over Interscope. The album was recorded from November 2006 to May 2007 in Manhattan. The album was produced by Rich Costey, who is notable for his work with Muse on Absolution and Black Holes and Revelations, as well as Franz Ferdinand on You Could Have It So Much Better.

Paul Banks recalled to Vice that it was the hardest the band had ever worked on a record, claiming that the band spent "months in the studio", which is quite common for major labels, but the group had never recorded an album in such a traditional fashion. Banks further added: "I at one point worked 88 out of 90 days in the studio for that record" for vocals alone, and that "it took me 88 days to do then I could do in five days now". In 2010, Sam Fogarino recalled to LA Weekly that the band made the choice to go with a major label because they wanted to expand their fanbase. Fogarino stated: "At that point, I had more of the impression that many more artists of our ilk were on majors. They had sort of used the system and started someplace and gone somewhere else because they thought they'd be better... you know, to have more options of exposure and getting a larger fan base. There were a lot of bands in that situation. For us, I don't think we thought it was that out of sync. It was pretty good common sense to try and expand." The band ended their two-album contract after recording one album and left Capitol "amicably", returning to Matador. Fogarino said: "It was great that Capitol let us go on a handshake. There was no litigation filed, and nothing ugly about it. It was a good lesson learned at the end of the day."

In 2019, Fogarino elaborated more on their experience recording the album with Capitol and by claiming that the group chose Capitol specifically because there was a "great staff" at Capitol that had "a lot of experience with great bands like Radiohead and Sparklehorse". "That was the staff that worked on all those records like Kid A and Amnesiac and sold a million copies each even though they weren't pop albums. We thought, 'This could work. These people know what's going on'." However, the staff they signed on to work with was fired once the label was sold. Fogarino said: "As soon as we started rolling tape, they all got fired. All the staff that signed us and had stuck with us through the Matador years, they all got fired and we had no more support." The label's staff also changed often, resulting in the group not knowing who was even in charge. Fogarino elaborated: "It felt like we were without a label. They weren't trying to tell us what to do or anything... but they weren't doing anything for us. That ceiling lowered in a sense, and made us rethink what we were doing."

== Composition ==
According to the band members, Our Love to Admire is more "expressive" than the group's previous efforts. In an interview with NME, guitarist Daniel Kessler stated "we had keyboards on from the start which we've never done before. It's like a fifth member. There's a lot more texture, and interesting sounds, there's definitely progression and growth". Prior to the album's release, Billboard offered the following brief descriptions of some of the band's new songs:

First single "The Heinrich Maneuver" is a peppy kiss-off to an ex-love now residing on the opposite coast and hits radio May 7; the band has been playing it of late during its just-concluded Canadian tour. The band is on familiar footing with tracks like the tense "No I in Threesome" ("Maybe it's time we give something new a try," frontman Paul Banks sings) and the relentless "Mammoth," which are loaded with Daniel Kessler's simple, repeated guitar riffs and Carlos D's powerful bass underpinnings. There are some new sonic experiments; the album begins with the funereal, nearly six-minute "Pioneer to the Falls," featuring Jim Morrison-esque crooning from Banks, and wraps with another unusually ambient piece, "The Lighthouse." Hints of soul creep in on the spaced-out "Rest My Chemistry" ("I haven't slept for two days / I've bathed in nothing but sweat," Banks sings) and "Pace Is the Trick."

— Billboard article on the band's upcoming release.

== Release ==
Sometime in March 2007, an album called Mammoth, attributed to Interpol, appeared on P2P networks. However, the album was actually a renamed copy of Exit Decades, recorded by Swedish band Cut City. Due to some similarities in style between those two bands, this "fake leak" was quite convincing to some listeners. There was another false leak—a renamed version of Sam's Town by the Killers with "The Heinrich Maneuver" included on it.

The song "The Heinrich Maneuver" was streamed in its entirety from AOL's music blog, Spinner, a few days before the single's official release. MP3 rips of this stream were widely circulated through the internet via P2P clients. On June 16, 2007, "The Scale", "All Fired Up" and "Rest My Chemistry" were leaked through MySpace in low quality audio. On June 20 "Pioneer to the Falls" was released on Pitchfork Media, as a stream. On June 21, 2007, the complete album was leaked onto P2P networks.

In 2008, "Pioneer to the Falls" featured as the closing music track in Smallville season 7, episode 10, "Persona".

On August 16, 2019, Our Love to Admire became unavailable on streaming platforms which caused some panic among fans. Paul Banks quickly addressed the issue by reassuring fans via Twitter that the album would be returned to streaming platforms. It was speculated that the removal of the album was due to licensing issues between Matador and Capitol. On December 10, 2020, it was announced that Matador had finally acquired Interpol's entire catalog rights, including Our Love to Admire.

== Reception ==
=== Critical ===
Professional ratings
Aggregate scores
Source	Rating
Metacritic	70/100
Review scores
Source	Rating
AllMusic	3.5/5 stars
Drowned in Sound	9/10
Entertainment Weekly	A−
Los Angeles Times	3/4 stars
musicOMH	5/5 stars
NME	8/10
The Observer	4/5 stars
Pitchfork	6.0/10
PopMatters	4/10
Uncut	4/5

Our Love to Admire received mostly positive reviews from music critics, although it was more polarizing compared to the band's previous releases. At Metacritic, which assigns a normalized rating out of 100 to reviews from mainstream critics, the album received an average score of 70/100, based on 37 professional critic reviews, which indicates "generally favorable reviews". Playlouder gave it all five stars and said, "The band have colonised the rich turf at the intersection of meticulously structured mope-rock and free-flowing three-chord pop, where moments of resignation cosy up alongside twinkling hopes for the future like Winehouse to the sauce." Hot Press gave it a favorable review and said that the album "makes for hugely rewarding listening."

Uncut gave the album four stars out of five and called it "a majestic, grandiose, machine-tooled album, subtly orchestrated with gothic pianos and doomy organs." URB also gave it four stars out of five and called it "the type of strung-out confession that fills the junkie mold of classic Bright Lights Interpol--a welcomed revival after the wayward Antics." Now likewise gave the album four stars out of five and said that "In terms of writing and production, this may be Interpol at their best." Billboard gave it a favorable review and said that the band "retains its flair for dramatic images and ominous guitar lines on its major-label debut, but with producer/ mixer Rich Costey onboard, these signatures uncoil into more complex soundscapes." BBC Music gave it a positive review and said that Interpol are "tighter than a laser-guided smart bomb, the beats are more swingy, and Carlos D's bass and keys are even more expressive and swooning." The Boston Globe likewise gave it a favorable review and said, "The foreboding melancholy of 'Turn on the Bright Lights' has eroded into a sound that's less idiosyncratic; by design or accident, that broad-brush aesthetic coincides with the band's move from an indie label (Matador) to a major one (Capitol)." Q and Mojo both gave the album a score of four stars out of five.

The Phoenix gave the album three stars out of four and called it "well worth exploring". The A.V. Club gave it a B and said it "delivers exactly what's promised, which for fans will be exactly enough." Under the Radar gave the album seven stars out of ten and said it "isn't going to change many minds--those who already liked the band will find plenty to please, and vice versa." No Ripcord also gave it seven stars and said the album's lesser tracks "seem to have placed a greater emphasis on texture than melody or even rhythm, which is arguably the band’s most potent weapon. As a whole, though, Sam Fogarino will be satisfied." Paste gave the album three-and-a-half stars out of five and said that it "may not be [the band's] Sgt. Pepper, but it's still filled with morbidly catchy treats." The Village Voice gave it a positive review and said that "Somehow the band manages to sound insincere and gorgeous at the same time." Prefix Magazine also gave it a positive review and said it "sounds more or less like the last two [CDs], and that's its biggest problem."

Other reviews are average, mixed or negative: Yahoo! Music UK gave the album six stars out of ten and said of Interpol: "Crucially, it seems their ability to write a magisterially moving song such as "NYC" or "Obstacle No 1", both from their debut, seems to have abandoned them. In fairness, sonically speaking, this is their best effort yet." Blender gave it three stars out of five and also said of Interpol: "In fleshing out the contours of a sound once slavishly indebted to early-'80s titans like JD [Joy Division] and the Smiths, they've nuanced the moods Banks moons over. Awesome for him. Only so-so for us." Spin gave it a score of six out of ten and called it "oddly reined in" and "a transitional record by a band not yet willing to completely let go of the past." The Guardian gave it three stars out of five and called it "undoubtedly impressive: impressive enough, in fact, to counter the fact that Interpol are pretty light on ideas of their own."

The Austin Chronicle gave the album two stars out of five and said it "could use more Carlos D.'s low-end bass/keyboard flourishes. Perhaps it's time to turn the lights out." Stylus Magazine gave it a D saying that "they ape New Order's "Movement," surely that combo's most static and dullest album. Dengler and rather good drummer Sam Fogarino don't get many chances to shine, letting guitarist Daniel Kessler create the kind of textures that often get mistaken for progress."

=== Commercial ===
Our Love to Admire scored Interpol's best chart positions in their career, debuting inside the top five of the UK and US albums charts, reaching number three on the European Albums Chart and selling over 154,000 copies in its first week worldwide. The album debuted at number four on the Billboard 200, selling 73,000 copies, but then dropped to number 26 the next week with 22,000 copies. After 10 weeks, the album dropped off the chart, but by January 2009 it had sold 209,000 copies. It's notable that while the band's third album has sold far fewer copies in the US than their previous two did—the others have each moved close to 500,000 units—Our Love to Admire is still Interpol's highest-charting disc.

=== Retrospective commentary ===
In a 2018 interview with Vice, lead singer Paul Banks listed Our Love to Admire as his least favorite of the band's albums. Banks had just gotten sober and the pressure of working with a major label ultimately resulted in a "stressful" and "unpleasant" experience that was also "way too much work". The group had similar issues with the production of their fourth album Interpol, but said that the group was "proud of the music" on both, with Banks saying: "some of my favorite songs we ever wrote are on these two records, so it's not like the situation was bad and the record is bad." Drummer Sam Fogarino also cited issues with the new label during the album's production, claiming that the band felt welcome at first, but once the label was sold, that changed: "We're a number now, we're a number on a data print out."

== Track listing ==
All tracks are written by Paul Banks, Daniel Kessler, Carlos Dengler and Sam Fogarino.

Our Love to Admire track listing
No.	Title	Length
1.	"Pioneer to the Falls"	5:41
2.	"No I in Threesome"	3:51
3.	"The Scale"	3:33
4.	"The Heinrich Maneuver"	3:35
5.	"Mammoth"	4:19
6.	"Pace Is the Trick"	4:43
7.	"All Fired Up"	3:35
8.	"Rest My Chemistry"	5:00
9.	"Who Do You Think"	3:12
10.	"Wrecking Ball"	4:33
11.	"The Lighthouse"	5:25
Total length:		47:05

Japanese edition bonus tracks
No.	Title	Length
12.	"Mind Over Time"	4:49
13.	"Mammoth" (Instrumental)	4:12

Bonus DVD (from UK, Brazil and Mexico Tour edition re-release)

1. "Pioneer to the Falls" (Live at Astoria)
2. "NARC" (Live at Astoria)
3. "The Heinrich Maneuver" (Live at Astoria)
4. "Mammoth" (Live at Astoria)
5. "Slow Hands" (Live at Astoria)
6. "Evil" (Live at Astoria)
7. "The Heinrich Maneuver" (Music Video)
8. "No I in Threesome" (Music Video)

== Personnel ==
Interpol

- Paul Banks – vocals, guitar
- Daniel Kessler – guitar
- Carlos D. – bass guitar, keyboards
- Sam Fogarino – drums, percussion

Technical personnel

- Interpol – production
- Rich Costey – production, mixing, engineering
- Claudius Mittendorfer – engineering
- Brian Thorn – engineering assistance at The Magic Shop
- Charlie Stavish – engineering assistance at Electric Lady Studios
- Greg Calbi – mastering at Sterling Sound
- Seth Smoot – photography
- David Calderley – design

== Charts ==
=== Weekly charts ===
Weekly chart performance for Our Love to Admire
Chart (2007)	Peak position
Australian Albums (ARIA)	14
Austrian Albums (Ö3 Austria)	28
Belgian Albums (Ultratop Flanders)	3
Belgian Albums (Ultratop Wallonia)	15
Canadian Albums (Billboard)	5
Danish Albums (Hitlisten)	13
Finnish Albums (Suomen virallinen lista)	3
French Albums (SNEP)	19
German Albums (Offizielle Top 100)	16
Irish Albums (IRMA)	1
Italian Albums (FIMI)	16
Japanese Albums (Oricon)	88
Mexican Albums (AMPROFON)	5
New Zealand Albums (RMNZ)	29
Norwegian Albums (VG-lista)	17
Portuguese Albums (AFP)	6
Scottish Albums (Official Charts)	3
Swedish Albums (Sverigetopplistan)	27
Swiss Albums (Schweizer Hitparade)	28
UK Albums (Official Charts)	2
US Billboard 200	4
US Top Alternative Albums (Billboard)	2
US Top Rock Albums (Billboard)	2

=== Year-end charts ===
Year-end chart performance for Our Love to Admire
Chart (2007)	Position
Belgian Albums (Ultratop Flanders)	65
