= All the Rage Back Home =

Single by Interpol

from the album El Pintor
- B-side: "The Depths"
- Released: August 12, 2014
- Recorded: 2012
- Studio: Electric Lady Studios and Atomic Sound (New York, NY)
- Genre: Post-punk revival
- Length: 4:22
- Label: Matador; Soft Limit
- Songwriters: Paul Banks; Sam Fogarino; Daniel Kessler
- Producer: Interpol

Interpol singles chronology
"Try It On" (2011)	"All the Rage Back Home" (2014)	"Ancient Ways" (2014)

Music video
- "All the Rage Back Home" on YouTube

"All the Rage Back Home" is a song by American rock band Interpol. It is the first track and the lead single from the band's fifth studio album, El Pintor (2014) and was digitally released on August 12, 2014. Self-produced and written by the band, the song debuted at No. 37 on the Billboard Alternative Songs chart, peaking at No. 26. The song was also made available as downloadable content for the Rock Band series.

Rolling Stone described the song as "anxious, atmospheric post-punk".

== Music video ==
The music video for "All the Rage Back Home", co-directed by Sophia Peer and the band's lead singer, Paul Banks, was released on July 9, 2014. It shows the band performing the song in a dark room intercut with footage of surfers challenging waves. The black-and-white video also features Banks on bass guitar, which he occasionally performed with since the departure of bassist Carlos Dengler in 2010.

== Track listing ==
=== 7" vinyl ===
- Soft Limit — SOFTLIMIT02

Side A
No.	Title	Length
1.	"All the Rage Back Home"	4:22

Side B
No.	Title	Length
1.	"The Depths"	4:08

=== Digital download ===
No.	Title	Length
1.	"All the Rage Back Home"	4:22

== Personnel ==
Interpol

- Paul Banks – vocals, guitars, bass guitar
- Daniel Kessler – guitars
- Sam Fogarino – drums

Guest musicians

- Brandon Curtis – keyboards

Other personnel

- Interpol – production
- James Brown – recording
- Phil Joly – assistant engineer (Electric Lady Studios)
- Dakota Bowman – assistant engineer (Atomic Sound)
- Alan Moulder – mixing
- John Catlin – mix engineer
- Caesar Edmunds – mix assistant
- Greg Calbi – mastering

== Charts ==
Chart (2014)	Peak position
Czech Republic Modern Rock (IFPI)	6
Mexico Ingles Airplay (Billboard)	28
US Hot Rock & Alternative Songs (Billboard)	41
US Rock & Alternative Airplay (Billboard)	45
US Alternative Airplay (Billboard)	26

== Release history ==
Region	Date	Label	Format	Catalogue no.
Worldwide	August 12, 2014	Matador	Digital download	—
United Kingdom	2014	Soft Limit	7"	SOFTLIMIT02
