= Christopher Mills (director) =

Canadian animator and cinematographer

Christopher Mills is a Canadian director, editor, animator and cinematographer. He has directed music videos for bands such as Modest Mouse, Interpol, Broken Social Scene, Blue Rodeo, Metric, The Joy Formidable, Senses Fail and Breaking Benjamin. He has also worked on commercials, short films, documentaries, projections and art album covers. Mills' style and work is "Renowned for his unique mix of live action, 2D and 3D filmmaking techniques" according to the writer Anne T. Donahue. "Mills has taken otherwise simple concepts and helped make them magical, transforming each video from a standard visual counterpart to an entirely different form of expression".

Mills has had his work featured in Rolling Stone magazine and on many websites among them Kanye West's blog or MTV.com. He played on Oprah, MTV, MTV2, VH1, Much Music, and other music video networks worldwide. Mills has given retrospectives in respected universities, global film festivals, and at Canada's National Art Gallery. His work has been nominated for and has earned multiple awards, including MTV awards, MTV2 awards, Much Music Video Awards, Juno Awards, International Broadcasting Advertising awards. His video of Interpol's PDA was nominated for an MTV2 Awards in 2003 "Float On", for Modest Mouse, won the MTV "woody" award, was nominated for the MTV "breakthrough video" award, and was nominated for the MTV2 award.

Mills has contributed to and collaborated with musicians and advertisers in a variety of media, ranging from simple drawings for Broken Social Scene's self-titled album (nominated for a "Best Album Art" Juno), to giant stage projections for The Tragically Hip's 2004 oft sold-out stadium tour (later co-winning the Juno for Best Music DVD), to a feature-length experimental documentary film for Canadian cultural icons Blue Rodeo, The Blue Road (2008 Juno winner, "Best Music DVD").

== Videography ==
Music videos directed by Christopher Mills.

Year	Song	Band
2014	For Those Who Stay	PS I love You
2014	Alienation	Morning Parade
2014	The Terror Pulse	KEN mode
2014	Forever And Ever	Royal Wood
2013	The Turn Around	Eight and A Half
2013	Secret Vasectomy	KEN mode
2013	Turn Off The Robot	Burning House
2013	Dance With Me	Ra Ra Riot
2013	Dead Walkie	DAVIDS
2012	The Great Exhale	Great Lake Swimmers
2012	Nothing Is Anything (without you)	Wintersleep
2012	Cholla	The Joy Formidable
2012	Toronto	PS I Love You
2012	This Must Be The Place	Belle Starr
2012	Calm Before The Storm	Imaginary Cities
2012	Canadian Girls	Dean Brody
2012	Time	C. A. Smith
2012	Heavyweight	Our Lady Peace
2012	Count On Me	Cuff The Duke
2011	Taken Away	Nash
2011	Temporary Resident	Imaginary Cities
2011	Everyone Watched The Wedding	Jim Cuddy
2011	Blow Me Away	Breaking Benjamin
2011	A Heavy Abacus	The Joy Formidable
2011	Sad Robot Harmonies	Nash
2011	Not Getting Any Better	Inner Party System
2011	Whirring	The Joy Formidable
2010	Expecting To Fly	Metric
2010	Collect Call	Metric
2010	Tobias Grey	PostData
2010	We, Myself And I	Shad
2010	Dance Mother	Sweet Thing
2010	Angel Street	Lucie Idlout
2010	Blue Blood Blues	The Dead Weather
2009	Saviour	The Dears
2009	Disclaimer	The Dears
2009	Arizona Dust	Blue Rodeo
2009	Arlington	Ridley Bent
2008	Crooked Legs	The Acorn
2008	Shutterbuggin	Buck 65
2008	Dang	Buck 65
2008	The Flood Pt.1	The Acorn
2007	Monday, Monday, Monday	Tegan and Sara
2007	Far Cry	Rush
2007	The Mary Getaway	The Working Title
2007	Same In Any Language	I Nine
2007	Missed The Boat	Modest Mouse
2006	Now That I Miss Her	Elefant
2006	The Gate	Sam Roberts
2006	We Can Never Say Goodbye	The Open
2005	It's Not The Fall That Hurts	The Caesars
2005	Everything Is Alright (co-directed with Chris Grismer)	Motion City Soundtrack
2005	Rum Is For Drinking, Not For Burning	Senses Fail
2005	The Road Leads Where It's Led	Secret Machines
2005	Collide	Howie Day
2004	Vaccination Scar	The Tragically Hip
2004	Every Time It Rains	Charlotte Martin
2004	Simple Man	Shinedown
2004	Float On	Modest Mouse
2003	Perfect Time Of Day	Howie Day
2003	Stars And Sons	Broken Social Scene
2003	Shatterday	Vendetta Red
2003	World So Cold	Mudvayne
2003	Have A Little Faith	Mandy Moore
2002	PDA	Interpol
2002	Wonderful	Andy Stochansky
2000	Silently Screaming	Serial Joe
2000	Sad Nights	Blue Rodeo
2000	Below The Stars	King Cobb Steelie
1999	Rise With The Sun	The Punters
1999	Dancing With Myself	The Boomtang Boys
1999	In My Hands	Natalie MacMaster
1999	Umbrella	Mayor McCA
1998	Lemonade	Protein
1997	My Only Hope	Miller Stain Limit
