= Barricade (song) =

Single by Interpol

from the album Interpol
- Released: August 3, 2010
- Recorded: 2009–10
- Studio: Electric Lady Studios (New York, NY)
- Genre: Indie rock; post-punk revival; dance-punk
- Length: 4:09 (single/album version); 2:59 (radio edit)
- Label: Matador; Soft Limit
- Songwriter(s): Paul Banks; Carlos Dengler; Sam Fogarino; Daniel Kessler
- Producer(s): Interpol

Interpol singles chronology
"Mammoth" (2007)	"Barricade" (2010)	"Summer Well" (2010)

"Barricade" is a song by American rock band Interpol. It was released as the lead single from their self-titled fourth studio album on August 3, 2010. The song peaked at No. 39 on the Billboard Alternative Songs chart and was their fourth appearance on that chart.

== Music video ==
On August 28, the music video was released via the band's Facebook page. It was filmed at Floyd Bennett Airfield in Brooklyn, and directed by Moh Azima. It consists of Daniel Kessler and Sam Fogarino playing in front of mirrors, while Paul Banks sings in front of a projector.

== Track listing ==
- Matador — digital download

No.	Title	Length
1.	"Barricade"	4:09

- Matador — promo CD

No.	Title	Length
1.	"Barricade (Radio Edit)"	2:59

== Charts ==
Chart (2010)	Peak position
Belgium (Ultratip Bubbling Under Flanders)	22
Belgium (Ultratip Bubbling Under Wallonia)	31
Mexico Ingles Airplay (Billboard)	13
US Alternative Airplay (Billboard)	39
