= Interpol: The Trail of Dr. Chaos =

2007 video game

- Developer: TikGames
- Publisher: Sierra Online (XBLA)
- Platforms: Microsoft Windows, Mac OS X, Xbox 360, PlayStation 3
- Release: PC & Mac; September 5, 2007; XBLA; January 7, 2009; PSN; September 17, 2009
- Genres: Puzzle, strategy
- Mode: Single-player

Interpol: The Trail of Dr. Chaos is a puzzle strategy video game, developed by TikGames for the Microsoft Windows, Mac OS X, Xbox 360, and PlayStation 3.

== Reception ==
Reception

Aggregate scores
Aggregator	Score
GameRankings	PS3: 47.67% X360: 48.85%
Metacritic	PS3: 48/100; X360: 45/100

Review scores
Publication	Score
1Up.com	C
Destructoid	2/10
GameRevolution	0.5/5
GameSpot	4.5/10
GameZone	6.1/10
Giant Bomb	1/5
IGN	4.5/10
TeamXbox	7.6/10
VideoGamer.com	3/10
Gameplanet	6.5/10

Critical reception for Interpol: The Trail of Dr. Chaos has been negative. On Metacritic, the game holds scores of 45/100 for the Xbox 360 version based on 28 reviews, and 48/100 for the PlayStation 3 version based on 5 reviews. On GameRankings, the game holds scores of 48.85% for the Xbox 360 version based on 26 reviews, and 47.67% for the PlayStation 3 version based on 3 reviews.

IGN panned the game, writing "Interpol is good for a few short bursts of seek-and-find fun, but it's just not a game that's very well suited to the console. Add that to the poor image resolution, inconsistent puzzles and overall shaky production value, and you have a game that's probably not worth the download." ABC.com.au's Good Game Stories also panned the game.
