= Obstacle 1 =

Single by Interpol

from the album Turn on the Bright Lights
- B-side: "Obstacle 2" (Live); "PDA" (Live); "Hands Away" (Live); "Obstacle 1" (Live); Arthur Baker Remix
- Released: November 11, 2002
- Recorded: November 2001
- Studio: Tarquin (Bridgeport, CT)
- Genre: Indie rock; post-punk revival
- Length: 4:11 (album version); 3:36 (radio edit)
- Label: Matador
- Songwriters: Paul Banks; Carlos Dengler; Sam Fogarino; Daniel Kessler
- Producers: Gareth Jones; Peter Katis

Interpol singles chronology
"PDA" (2002)	"Obstacle 1" (2002)	"Say Hello to the Angels" / "NYC" (2003)

"Obstacle 1" is a song by American rock band Interpol. It was released as the second single from their debut studio album, Turn on the Bright Lights, on November 11, 2002. It was eventually remixed by producer Arthur Baker and reissued as a single on September 15, 2003. The music video for "Obstacle 1" was directed by Floria Sigismondi. The song peaked at number 41 on the UK Singles Chart and was critically acclaimed.

== Music video ==
The promotional video for the song was directed by Floria Sigismondi. It shows several shots of the band performing the song in an aisle, there are many electrical wires surrounding them. In a smaller room, a woman portrayed by Sigismondi herself dances erratically against a wall. A glass of water falls and breaks, the water begins to move across the floor towards the room where the woman is dancing. The woman falls and is electrocuted as a result of the electrical wires in the water.

== Reception and legacy ==
In their review of Turn on the Bright Lights, Pitchfork magazine praised the song and compared it to the music of Joy Division. In 2009, Pitchfork named the song the 64th best song of the 2000s.

The song was featured on Interpol's 2003 EP, The Black EP.

"Obstacle 1" is featured as a playable track on Guitar Hero World Tour. Singer Charlotte Martin has a rendition of "Obstacle 1" on her album, Reproductions. The song was also used to highlight Adam Sandler for Best Comedic Performance at the 2003 MTV Movie Awards for his work in Mr. Deeds.

== Track listing ==
=== 2002 single ===
CD (OLE570-2):

1. "Obstacle 1" – 4:11
2. "PDA" (Live KCRW Morning Becomes Eclectic Session) – 4:56
3. "Hands Away" (Live Peel Session) – 3:10

7" vinyl (OLE570-7):

1. "Obstacle 1" – 4:11
2. "Obstacle 2" (Live Peel Session) – 3:50

=== 2003 single ===
Remix CD (OLE594-2):

1. "Obstacle 1" (Arthur Baker Remix Edit) – 4:17
2. "Obstacle 1" (Arthur Baker Remix Long Version) – 5:55
3. "Obstacle 1" (Radio Edit) – 3:36

7" vinyl (OLE594-7):

1. "Obstacle 1" (Arthur Baker Remix Edit) – 4:17
2. "Obstacle 1" (Live Black Session) – 4:18

DVD (OLE594-9):

1. "Obstacle 1" (video) – 3:47
2. "Specialist" (Live Black Session) (audio) – 6:34
3. "Leif Erikson" (Live Black Session) (audio) – 3:55

== Chart performance ==
Chart (2002)	Peak position
Scotland Singles (OCC)	81
UK Singles (OCC)	72
Chart (2003)	Peak position
Scotland Singles (OCC)	53
UK Singles (OCC)	41
