= Bernard Lenoir =

Bernard Lenoir (born 13 September 1945) is a former radio presenter.

He was born in Deauville, and moved to Algeria which he left in 1962, working on the Côte d'Azur as a DJ. He briefly sang in a surf pop group called Les Radis Beurre.

Lenoir began on the French public radio station France Inter in the early 1970s as a music programmer on veteran presenter José Artur's Pop-Club show. He then presented the rock programme Feedback from September 1978 until November 1984. Afterwards, Lenoir worked in various stations, including the Antenne 2 public television programme Les Enfants du rock, and the Europe 1 radio station.

In September 1990, Lenoir resumed broadcasting on France Inter in the evening shift. His programme, which ran until the 2010–2011 season, was first called L'Inrockuptible, after the magazine Les Inrockuptibles, and later renamed C'est Lenoir (This is Lenoir).

He is currently retired in Biarritz, France.

== See also ==
- C'est Lenoir
- John Peel
- Hugo Cassavetti
- Yves Thibord
- Jean-Daniel Beauvallet
- Michka Assayas
- Ivan Smagghe
- Lydie Barbarian
- António Sérgio
