= Everything Is Wrong (song) =

Single by Interpol

from the album El Pintor
- B-side: "What Is What"
- Released: April 18, 2015
- Recorded: May 2012 - October 2013
- Studio: Electric Lady Studios and Atomic Sound (New York, NY)
- Genre: Post-punk revival
- Length: 3:33
- Label: Matador
- Songwriters: Paul Banks; Sam Fogarino; Daniel Kessler
- Producer: Interpol

Interpol singles chronology
"Anywhere" (2015)	"Everything Is Wrong" (2015)	"The Rover" (2018)

Music video
- "Everything Is Wrong" on YouTube

"Everything Is Wrong" is a song by American rock band Interpol. It was released as the third single from their fifth studio album, El Pintor (2014), on April 18, 2015. The single was released on Record Store Day as a limited-edition vinyl 7-inch. A music video for the song was released on January 22, 2015. A remix of the song was later made by Bosnian DJ Solomun, which was released in April 2016. "Everything Is Wrong" peaked at No. 35 on the Billboard Alternative Songs chart and appeared on the soundtrack for MLB 15: The Show.

== Music video ==
The official music video for "Everything Is Wrong" was released on January 22, 2015. It was co-directed by Carlos Puga and Interpol frontman Paul Banks. The video is centered on band members Banks, Daniel Kessler and Sam Fogarino as they walk throughout New York City on their way to a concert they will be playing at. While it shows Kessler and Fogarino acting nice towards other people, Banks is depicted as a more rude person who bothers others. Tom Breihan of Stereogum labeled Banks as "basically a Jeremy Renner character" in the video.

== Release ==
Prior to its single release, the song was featured on the soundtrack for the video game MLB 15: The Show. "Everything Is Wrong" was released as a limited edition vinyl 7" as part of Record Store Day 2015. Only 4,000 copies of the single were made. The song was backed with "What Is What", a previously unreleased track. The artwork for the single was created by Shepard Fairey. A remix of the song was made by Bosnian DJ Solomun, which was released on April 29, 2016 by 2DIY4.

== Track listing ==
- Matador – OLE-1081-7 – Record Store Day 7" vinyl single

Side A
No.	Title	Length
1.	"Everything Is Wrong"	3:33

Side B
No.	Title	Length
1.	"What Is What"	3:33

- 2DIY4 – 2DIY4-16 – 12" remixes single

Solomun Remixes
No.	Title	Length
1.	"Everything Is Wrong (Solomun Stripped Remix)"	9:22
2.	"Everything Is Wrong (Solomun Remix)"	7:23

== Charts ==
Chart (2015)	Peak position
Poland (ZPAV)	62
US Alternative Airplay (Billboard)	35
