= Mammoth (Interpol song) =

Single by Interpol

from the album Our Love to Admire
- Released: September 3, 2007
- Recorded: Electric Lady, New York City
- Genre: Post-punk revival
- Length: 4:12
- Label: Capitol
- Songwriters: Paul Banks; Carlos Dengler; Sam Fogarino; Daniel Kessler
- Producers: Rich Costey, Interpol

Interpol singles chronology
"The Heinrich Maneuver" (2007)	"Mammoth" (2007)	"Barricade" (2010)

"Mammoth" is a song by the American rock band Interpol. It was released on September 3, 2007 as the second and final single from the band's third studio album, Our Love to Admire (2007). The track was released only as a single in Europe and the UK. It reached number 44 on the UK Singles Chart. The song is the band's last release by the Capitol Records label as Interpol had returned to its previous label, Matador Records.

Before the song was named "Mammoth" it was called "Pawn Shop" because of its lyrics. It was one of the first songs to be recorded for the album.

== Track listing ==
CD:

1. "Mammoth" (explicit radio mix) – 3:59
2. "Mammoth" (Erol Alkan reworking) – 5:24
3. "Pioneer to the Falls" (orchestral version) – 5:31
4. "Mammoth" (enhanced video)

7" #1 (one-sided etched vinyl inside a gatefold sleeve):

1. "Mammoth"

7" #2:

1. "Mammoth" (explicit radio mix)
2. "Evil" (live)

12":

1. "Mammoth" (Erol Alkan remix)
2. "The Heinrich Maneuver" (Paul Epworth Phones remix)

== Music video ==
The music video is a live performance of Interpol performing the song in The Astoria, London, UK, on February 7, 2007. The audio in the video is not from the concert, but the edited version of "Mammoth".

== Charts ==
=== Weekly charts ===
Chart (2007)	Peak position
Scottish Singles Sales (Official Charts)	14
UK Singles (Official Charts)	44
