= El Pintor =

Studio album by Interpol
- Released: September 8, 2014
- Studios: Electric Lady (New York City); Atomic Sound (New York City)
- Genres: Indie rock; post-punk revival
- Length: 39:50
- Labels: Matador; Soft Limit
- Producer: Interpol

Interpol chronology
| Interpol (2010) | El Pintor (2014) | Marauder (2018) |

Singles from El Pintor
- 1. "All the Rage Back Home" Released: August 12, 2014; 2. "Ancient Ways" Released: August 19, 2014; 3. "My Desire" Released: October 27, 2014; 4. "Anywhere" Released: March 9, 2015; 5. "Everything Is Wrong" Released: April 18, 2015

El Pintor (Spanish for "the painter"; also an anagram of "Interpol") is the fifth studio album by the American rock band Interpol. It was released through Matador Records and Soft Limit on September 8, 2014, internationally, and on September 9, 2014, in North America. El Pintor is the band's first album without bassist Carlos Dengler, who departed Interpol after the release of the band's eponymous album in 2010.

El Pintor received both critical and fan praise. The band embarked on a summer tour preceding the album's release. Five singles were released from the album: "All the Rage Back Home", "Ancient Ways", "My Desire", "Anywhere", and "Everything Is Wrong".

== Production ==
Self-produced by the band and recorded at Electric Lady Studios and Atomic Sound in New York City, the album was engineered by James Brown (known for his work for Foo Fighters) and mixed by Alan Moulder (known for his production and mixing work for My Bloody Valentine, Swervedriver, the Smashing Pumpkins and Nine Inch Nails). The bass duties on the album were taken over by frontman Paul Banks. The album features guest appearances by Brandon Curtis (Secret Machines), Roger Joseph Manning Jr. (Jellyfish) and Rob Moose (Bon Iver).

In a 2018 interview with Vice, Banks claimed that the band's future was uncertain after Dengler left, saying: "it was really just daunting to find out if we could be a good band without Carlos, because he was a really integral member of our band." However, it did not take long for the group to find the type of sound they wanted to go with in the future. Banks continued: "I think everyone was of common mind and purpose when we made this record. We'd gone pretty far left on Interpol, so I think there was a spirit of 'Let's just try to rock.' It was a good reset for us."

== Critical reception ==
Professional ratings
Aggregate scores
| Source | Rating |
|---|---|
| AnyDecentMusic? | 7.5/10 |
| Metacritic | 77/100 |
Review scores
| Source | Rating |
| AllMusic | 3.5/5 stars |
| The A.V. Club | A− |
| Chicago Tribune | 3.5/4 stars |
| The Guardian | 4/5 stars |
| Mojo | 4/5 stars |
| NME | 8/10 |
| Pitchfork | 5.9/10 |
| Q | 4/5 stars |
| Rolling Stone | 3.5/5 stars |
| Uncut | 7/10 |

Reviews of El Pintor have been highly positive overall. At Metacritic, which assigns a normalized rating out of 100 to reviews from critics, the album received an average score of 77, which indicates "generally favorable reviews", based on 34 (26 positive and eight mixed) reviews. Clash magazine critic Will Salmon wrote: "...as an exercise in getting back to where you once belonged, El Pintor is highly successful". Dom Gourlay of Drowned in Sound thought that the album "feels more structured than Interpol" and stated, "Bold in intention and quiet in confidence, they've gone back to basics here and for the most part, the results are sublime". Gourlay also described the album as the band's "finest record in a decade". Writing for NME, Rhian Daly stated that the band proved that "there's still plenty of value in their elegantly downtrodden aesthetic." The Skinny critic Gary Kaill wrote: "Expansive and texturally advanced, and arguably their strongest outing since that lauded debut, this is a welcome second coming". Uncut magazine also stated: "It's back go [sic] icy, slightly gothic basics". Larry Fitzmaurice of Pitchfork gave a more mixed review of the album, stating: "There's nothing here that touches the band's creative peak, but any of El Pintor's songs could hang with Interpol's strongest deep cuts".

El Pintor made its way onto multiple music magazine best of the year lists, most prominently, Drowned in Sound (No. 13), Q (No. 12) and NME (No. 49). It was voted the second best album of 2014 by the popular German music website Laut.de.

== Accolades ==
Accolades for El Pintor
| Publication | Accolade | Rank |
|---|---|---|
| Q | Top 50 Albums of 2014 | 12 |
| Drowned in Sound | 50 Favourite Albums of 2014 | 13 |
| NME | Top 50 Albums of 2014 | 49 |

== Track listing ==
All tracks are written by Interpol (Paul Banks, Sam Fogarino, and Daniel Kessler).

| No. | Title | Length |
|---|---|---|
| 1. | "All the Rage Back Home" | 4:22 |
| 2. | "My Desire" | 5:00 |
| 3. | "Anywhere" | 3:12 |
| 4. | "Same Town, New Story" | 4:09 |
| 5. | "My Blue Supreme" | 3:09 |
| 6. | "Everything Is Wrong" | 3:32 |
| 7. | "Breaker 1" | 4:13 |
| 8. | "Ancient Ways" | 3:00 |
| 9. | "Tidal Wave" | 4:17 |
| 10. | "Twice as Hard" | 4:56 |

iTunes pre-order
| No. | Title | Length |
|---|---|---|
| 11. | "The Depths" | 4:08 |

Target deluxe edition
| No. | Title | Length |
|---|---|---|
| 11. | "Malfeasance" | 4:36 |
| 12. | "Slow Hands" (live at the Brixton Academy) | 3:18 |

== Personnel ==
Personnel adapted from the album's liner notes.

Interpol

- Daniel Kessler – guitars, piano on "Twice as Hard"
- Paul Banks – vocals, guitars, bass guitar
- Sam Fogarino – drums

Guest musicians

- Brandon Curtis – keyboards (all except "Tidal Wave")
- Roger Joseph Manning, Jr. – keyboards on "Tidal Wave"
- Rob Moose – violin and viola on "Twice as Hard"
- Brad Truax – bass on "Slow Hands" (live)

Technical personnel

- Interpol – production
- James Brown – recording
- Phil Joly – assistant engineer (Electric Lady Studios)
- Dakota Bowman – assistant engineer (Atomic Sound)
- Alan Moulder – mixing
- John Catlin – mix engineer
- Caesar Edmunds – mix assistant
- Greg Calbi – mastering
- Graphic Therapy NYC – artwork

== Charts ==
=== Weekly charts ===
Weekly chart performance for El Pintor
| Chart (2014) | Peak position |
|---|---|
| Australian Albums (ARIA) | 11 |
| Austrian Albums (Ö3 Austria) | 13 |
| Belgian Albums (Ultratop Flanders) | 11 |
| Belgian Albums (Ultratop Wallonia) | 11 |
| Canadian Albums (Billboard) | 15 |
| Danish Albums (Hitlisten) | 30 |
| Dutch Albums (Album Top 100) | 16 |
| Finnish Albums (Suomen virallinen lista) | 45 |
| German Albums (Offizielle Top 100) | 11 |
| Italian Albums (FIMI) | 25 |
| New Zealand Albums (RMNZ) | 27 |
| Polish Albums (ZPAV) | 50 |
| Portuguese Albums (AFP) | 11 |
| Scottish Albums (Official Charts) | 10 |
| Spanish Albums (Promusicae) | 25 |
| Swiss Albums (Schweizer Hitparade) | 11 |
| UK Albums (Official Charts) | 9 |
| UK Independent Albums (Official Charts) | 1 |
| US Billboard 200 | 7 |
| US Digital Albums (Billboard) | 11 |
| US Independent Albums (Billboard) | 2 |
| US Top Alternative Albums (Billboard) | 1 |
| US Top Rock Albums (Billboard) | 2 |
| US Indie Store Album Sales (Billboard) | 2 |

=== Year-end charts ===
Year-end chart performance for El Pintor
| Chart (2014) | Position |
|---|---|
| Belgian Albums (Ultratop Flanders) | 168 |
| Belgian Albums (Ultratop Wallonia) | 192 |
| US Independent Albums (Billboard) | 39 |

== Release history ==
Release history and formats for El Pintor
| Region | Date | Label |
|---|---|---|
| International | September 8, 2014 | Soft Limit |
| United States | September 9, 2014 | Matador |
