= The Heinrich Maneuver =

Single by Interpol

from the album Our Love to Admire
- B-side: "Concert Introduction"; "Wrecking Ball"; "Mammoth" (instrumental)
- Released: May 7, 2007
- Recorded: 2006–07
- Studio: Electric Lady, New York City
- Genre: Post-punk revival; indie rock
- Length: 3:35 (album version); 3:28 (single version)
- Label: Capitol; Parlophone
- Songwriters: Paul Banks; Daniel Kessler; Carlos Dengler; Sam Fogarino
- Producer: Rich Costey

Interpol singles chronology
"C'mere" (2005)	"The Heinrich Maneuver" (2007)	"Mammoth" (2007)

"The Heinrich Maneuver" is a song by American rock band Interpol. It was released on May 7, 2007, as the lead single from their third studio album, Our Love to Admire (2007). It was Interpol's first release through Capitol Records after signing with the label. The picture sleeve for the single features a Serval cat. The song's title is a play on the Heimlich Maneuver and an allusion to the novel White Noise by Don DeLillo.

== Sound ==
Popular music magazine Billboard described the song as "a peppy kiss-off to an ex-love now residing on the opposite coast."

Like the majority of previous full-length Antics, this first single from Interpol's third album, Our Love to Admire, relies more on a guitar riff than the band's killer rhythm section. It's an Antics-worthy riff, though. And what's more, Paul Banks' lyrics are, atypically, not cringe-worthy (though "you wear those shoes like a dove" certainly walks that line). His vocals sounds different as well: less reverby, possibly doubled up, and more Michael Stipe-like. Come to think of it, "'cause today my heart swings" is the kind of lyric that seems straight from the R.E.M. frontman's notebook. As for the song's title, it must be something the band employs to write catchy choruses.

— Pitchfork, commenting on the song.

== Promotion ==
The single was released to radio on May 7, 2007. Q101/WKQX Chicago was the first radio station to play "The Heinrich Maneuver", doing so on 27 April 2007 at 6:12pm CDT. The song was played by Steve Lamacq of BBC Radio 1 for the first time on British radio on 7 May 2007. "The Heinrich Maneuver" was also played regularly throughout the band's tour of Canada, along with the new songs "Pioneer to the Falls" and "Mammoth". Bootleg recordings from that tour have been widely circulated on music forums and P2P networks. The single was released as a two-track CD single as well as two separate 7" vinyl singles in the UK on July 2. The song was used in an episode of MTV's The Hills and a 2012 AT&T commercial.

== Chart performance ==
"The Heinrich Maneuver" peaked at number 11 on the Billboard Alternative Songs chart, number 18 on the Billboard Bubbling Under Hot 100 Singles chart and number 31 on the UK Singles Chart. The song also came in at #98 in the Triple J Hottest 100 of 2007.

== Music video ==
The video for "The Heinrich Maneuver" was released on June 26, 2007. It is a single take of the main character, a woman in a white dress, shown in extreme slow motion applying lipstick and walking towards her demise, being hit by a bus. This overlays three other characters whose reactions to the event unfold in a mixture of speed altered motion, initially proceeding forward and then reversing. A man taking out his cellphone, a vogue lady screaming, and a waiter running to the scene. The woman featured unwittingly walks in front of a moving bus whose impact is cut short by the screen turning black as the song's outro is cut short.

The first single to be released from the album is the twisted love song/ode to Cali "The Heinrich Maneuver." Interpol is teaming up with Elias Merhige -- best known for his work with Shadow of the Vampire and the cult-classic Begotten -- to shoot the video for this single.

— excerpt from the Interpol newsletter E-mail

== Track listing ==
=== 7": Parlophone / CL894 (UK) ===
1. "The Heinrich Maneuver" (Radio Edit) – 3:28
2. "Concert Introduction" – 2:22

=== 7": Parlophone / CLS894 (UK) ===
1. "The Heinrich Maneuver" (Radio Edit) – 3:28
2. "Wrecking Ball" – 4:30

=== CD: Parlophone / CLCD894 (UK) ===
1. "The Heinrich Maneuver" (Radio Edit) – 3:28
2. "Mammoth" (Instrumental) – 4:16

== Charts ==
=== Weekly charts ===
Chart (2007)	Peak position
Belgium (Ultratip Bubbling Under Flanders)	12
Canada Hot 100 (Billboard)	96
Canada Rock (Billboard)	20
Czech Republic Modern Rock (IFPI)	19
European Hot 100 Singles (Billboard)	94
UK Singles (OCC)	31
US Alternative Airplay (Billboard)	11
US Bubbling Under Hot 100 (Billboard)	18

=== Year-end charts ===
Chart (2007)	Position
US Alternative Songs (Billboard)	39
