= Interpol (album) =

Studio album by Interpol
- Released: September 7, 2010
- Recorded: 2009–2010
- Studios: Electric Lady, New York City
- Genres: Indie rock; post-punk revival
- Length: 45:53
- Labels: Matador; Soft Limit
- Producer: Interpol

Interpol chronology
Interpol: Live in Astoria EP (2007)	Interpol (2010)	El Pintor (2014)

Singles from Interpol
- 1. "Barricade" Released: August 3, 2010; 2. "Summer Well" Released: December 6, 2010; 3. "Lights" Released: February 8, 2011; 4. "Try It On" Released: April 16, 2011

Interpol is the fourth studio album by the American rock band Interpol, released on September 7, 2010, through Matador Records. The self-produced album was recorded at Electric Lady Studios in Greenwich Village. It is the band's final album to feature founding member and bassist Carlos Dengler, who left shortly after the album's completion.

Interpol was released to lukewarm critical reception, with some critics negatively comparing it to their prior albums. In a 2018 interview with Vice, lead singer Paul Banks claimed that tensions within the band, particularly regarding Dengler's departure, made the album "hard and unpleasant to make" and that "we suffered for this record a lot". However, despite its rocky production, the group was happy with the album. Banks claimed that "what ultimately wound up on that record is some of our best stuff", specifically citing "Lights" and "The Undoing" as two of the band's best songs yet.

The lead single "Barricade" was released on August 3, 2010, followed by "Summer Well" on December 6; "Lights" on February 8, 2011; and "Try It On" on April 16, 2011.

== Background ==
After Interpol's contract with Matador expired in 2006, the band signed on with Capitol Records. According to drummer Sam Fogarino, the group chose to go with a major label because they liked the staff at Capitol and hoped to get more exposure. The band was happy with the decision at first, but the label was sold shortly after they began recording their new album and the staff that they were working with were fired. This, coupled with the confusion of ever-changing staff and the exhaustive months that were spent meticulously recording the album, the group decided to amicably terminate their two-album deal and return to Matador after one record. Recording on Interpol started at Electric Lady Studios in early 2009. The band announced that they were writing new songs in March of that year. Interpol was produced by the band, engineered by Greg Calbi and Claudius Mittendorfer, and mixed by Alan Moulder. Rapper Azealia Banks guested on backing vocals on "Memory Serves". Paul Banks told Vice that they chose to self-title the album because "there's something laid bare about it, like, 'This is us and this is who we are.' I was never aware that there was a precedent that debut records were supposed to be self-titled. I was just like, 'It feels good to make this one self-titled.'”

"Lights" was released as a free download through the band's website, originally in May 2010. The music video for "Lights" was directed by Charlie White, who had previously collaborated with the band by directing the music video for their 2004 single "Evil", off of Antics. White's video for "Evil" was acclaimed by fans for its bizarre imagery of a puppet dealing with a car accident. White contacted the band, claiming that he wanted to do a more abstract take for the video for "Lights" to mimic the band's signature surreal and vague lyrics. White's video for "Lights" depicted a sexualized and morbid interpretation of a pheromone harvesting ritual inside of a three-horned rhinoceros beetle. In the video, two women in latex costumes use needles and a large black monolith, which presumably represents an enzyme, to extract white pheromones from a third woman, who presumably represents a substrate. Banks claimed that the group was very happy with the video, saying that they "wanted a striking film clip above all else for 'Lights' – and that it be strange." The band formally released the music video in June 2010 on their website and mailing list, writing: "We'd like to share with you our clip for 'Lights' directed by Mr. Charlie White. Before this clip is available anywhere else, we're posting it here as an HD download, free for you. We're amazed by it, and think you'll enjoy seeing it as the director intended it to be seen – in high quality. It takes a couple minutes to download, but trust us, it is worth it."

In 2019, Fogarino recalled that returning to Matador was difficult at first. He said: "They were hurt. They said, straight up, 'Aside from business, it hurt our feelings that you left us... for Capitol?' And they used to have a relationship with them years ago. So, it took a minute to get everything back in line, but after that... there was never a need to leave this label again." Fogarino went on to say: "It's where we come from. It's a great label and a great place to be. To compare the two operations, Matador's office is open. I can walk in anytime, and talk to anybody about anything. I only went to Capitol twice and had to make an appointment, wait in a waiting room and be called upon with a limited amount of time." Fogarino further said: "I can simply just walk into the office and take a break from life and go hang out in the conference room and have a cup of coffee or a beer and hang out with the people there because they're music fans."

== Critical reception ==
Professional ratings
Aggregate scores
Source	Rating
Metacritic	66/100
Review scores
Source	Rating
AllMusic	3.5/5 stars
Consequence	4/5 stars
Drowned in Sound	7/10
Entertainment Weekly	B+
Los Angeles Times	2/4 stars
Pitchfork	4.6/10
PopMatters	5/10
Rolling Stone	3.5/5 stars
Spin	5/10
Under the Radar	7/10 stars

Interpol received a weighted score of 66 out of 100 from review aggregate website Metacritic, indicating "generally favourable reviews", based on 22 reviews from music critics AnyDecentMusic? shows a rating of 6.3 based on 33 reviews. Victoria Segal of Q awarded the album 4 out of 5 stars, stating that "Paul Banks's vocals [are] as attention-grabbing as a hand on the back of the neck while subtle textures rub up against the drama of the guitars", and concluded by saying that "for a band who specialise in the dark, their touch is thankfully light". Chris Coplan from Consequence gave the album 4 stars out of 5, praising the "rich narrative" and "brilliant pacing found throughout the record", and describing it as "a story that builds from an emotionally-resilient semi-joyousness in the beginning [...] to creepy, morose, and sinister by the end".

Simon Vozick-Levinson of Entertainment Weekly felt that on Interpol, "the riffs [...] are grander, the rhythms more limber, and the melodies more memorably moody than they've been in years", and stated that "lapsed fans may be surprised to find themselves reminded of why they loved this band in the first place". Rob Sheffield of Rolling Stone called it "a surprisingly solid comeback" and praised Daniel Kessler's guitar as "the essence of arty post-punk romance". In an early track-by-track review of the album, Paul Stokes of NME wrote that the band is "as atmospheric and dark as they were on their debut, and yet more intricate, and – as the trumpets prove – orchestral". Later, Mark Robinson of the same magazine gave the album 6 out of 10, saying that "Interpol seems cinematic, abstract and complex, but that adds up to something interesting rather than thrilling".

Mikael Wood of The Village Voice gave it a favorable review, and said that Interpol "manage[s] the seemingly unmanageable task of finding new wrinkles in a tightly defined sound, one that's been theirs for nearly a decade". Justin Jacobs of Paste gave the album a score of 7.3 out of 10 and stated, "Though the record meanders into aimless moping in its final third, most of the 10 tracks are bold, heavy and among Interpol's best". Jim Scott of Under the Radar gave it 7 stars out of 10, and said that the album "restores some of the shine, but the music still feels softer somehow, the cuts not as precise". Ian Wade of BBC Music also gave it a positive review, stating: "There's still the chance that this album will finally push [Interpol] into the stratosphere -- you wish Interpol were globally huge, you really do -- although it's likely that their future won't be written until after Dengler's tour-replacements have helped broaden the band's palette more".

Other reviews were average or mixed: Yahoo! Music UK gave the album 6 stars out of 10 and stated, "Instead of ending tensely and dramatically [Interpol] are the final whimper and sigh of an album named after a band that have lost their way and aren't sure which direction they should be heading". Alternative Press also gave the album 3 stars out of 5, and said, "Even if Banks sticks to the 'I've got two secrets but I only told you one' songwriting approach, hopefully a band shakeup will spark the soulfulness only occasionally heard in his contributions". Will Dean of The Guardian also gave it 3 stars out of 5, and said, "It could be that [Interpol are] distracted -- they've been together 10 years, and have numerous solo projects; is there more to for them to do with Interpol?"

Some critics reviewed the album negatively. Paul Schrodt of Slant Magazine gave the album 2.5 stars out of 5, and said that it "may not be quite self-parody, but it's also not the sort of thing that's going to make [the band] hip again anytime soon. Not that they would even care". Prefix Magazine critic Daba said, "Where they used to sound like the crackling of a subway car rounding a bend or the seediest alleys of New York in the pre-dawn hours, here they sound like alt-rock renderings of what moody post-punk is supposed to sound like".

Benjamin Boles from Now gave the album 3 stars out of 5, saying that the band does not sound "exactly eclectic in mood, sound or even tempo" and noticing that "the best moments come when they shy away from their trademark wall-of-reverb blueprint". He concluded that "it's a better album than their last, and diehard fans should be satisfied, but it's not going to get the rest [...] very excited". Josh Modell of Spin gave the album a score of 5 out of 10 and found it "more dull than hypnotic". He felt that "it tries to assemble skyscrapers, but ends up muddling around without a strong foundation" and noticed that Interpol sounds "both strangely distant and overly familiar, like a band struggling to remember who they are". Greg Kot of the Chicago Tribune described it as "bits and pieces of promising music without strong foundations", and stated that although "the band sounds terrific", the album does not offer "more than one or two truly memorable songs".

== Track listing ==
All tracks are written by Interpol (Paul Banks, Daniel Kessler, Carlos Dengler and Sam Fogarino).

Interpol track listing
No.	Title	Length
1.	"Success"	3:28
2.	"Memory Serves"	5:03
3.	"Summer Well"	4:05
4.	"Lights"	5:38
5.	"Barricade"	4:11
6.	"Always Malaise (The Man I Am)"	4:15
7.	"Safe Without"	4:41
8.	"Try It On"	3:42
9.	"All of the Ways"	5:18
10.	"The Undoing"	5:11
Total length:		45:53

iTunes bonus track
No.	Title	Length
11.	"Crimewaves"	3:26

Japanese edition bonus track
No.	Title	Length
11.	"Gavilan" (former "Cubed/Mascara")	6:49

== Personnel ==
Interpol

- Paul Banks – vocals, guitar
- Daniel Kessler – guitar, piano
- Carlos D – bass guitar, keyboards
- Sam Fogarino – drums, percussion

Additional performer

- Azealia Banks – backing vocals on "Memory Serves"

Technical personnel

- Interpol – production, design
- Claudius Mittendorfer – recording
- Noah Goldstein – recording assistance
- Alan Moulder – mixing
- Catherine Marks – mix engineer
- John Catlin – mix assistant
- Greg Calbi – mastering
- GraphicTherapy NYC – design
- GMDThree – 3D animations

== Charts ==
=== Weekly charts ===
Weekly chart performance for Interpol
Chart (2010)	Peak position
Australian Albums (ARIA)	7
Austrian Albums (Ö3 Austria)	15
Belgian Albums (Ultratop Flanders)	5
Belgian Albums (Ultratop Wallonia)	7
Danish Albums (Hitlisten)	19
Dutch Albums (Album Top 100)	7
Finnish Albums (Suomen virallinen lista)	25
French Albums (SNEP)	19
German Albums (Offizielle Top 100)	13
Irish Albums (IRMA)	13
Italian Albums (FIMI)	8
Japanese Albums (Oricon)	132
Mexican Album Chart	18
New Zealand Albums (RMNZ)	31
Norwegian Albums (VG-lista)	27
Scottish Albums (Official Charts)	14
Spanish Albums (Promusicae)	30
Swedish Albums (Sverigetopplistan)	34
Swiss Albums (Schweizer Hitparade)	20
UK Albums (Official Charts)	10
US Billboard 200	7
US Independent Albums (Billboard)	1
US Top Alternative Albums (Billboard)	3

=== Year-end charts ===
Year-end chart performance for Interpol
Chart (2010)	Position
US Independent Albums	41
