= Turn On the Bright Lights =

2002 debut studio album by Interpol

Studio album by Interpol
- Released: August 19, 2002
- Recorded: November 2001
- Studio: Tarquin Studios (Bridgeport, Connecticut)
- Genres: Indie rock; alternative rock; post-punk revival
- Length: 49:02
- Label: Matador
- Producer: Peter Katis

Interpol chronology
Interpol (EP) (2002)	Turn On the Bright Lights (2002)	The Black EP (2003)

Singles from Turn On the Bright Lights
- 1. "PDA" Released: August 22, 2002; 2. "Obstacle 1" Released: November 11, 2002; 3. "Say Hello to the Angels" / "NYC" Released: April 14, 2003

Turn On the Bright Lights is the debut studio album by American rock band Interpol. It was released in the United Kingdom on August 19, 2002, and in the United States the following day, through independent record label Matador Records. Produced by Peter Katis, the album was recorded in November 2001 at Tarquin Studios in Bridgeport, Connecticut. Producer Gareth Jones assisted Katis with mixing. The title derives from a recurring lyric in the song "NYC".

Upon release, the record peaked at No. 101 on the UK Albums Chart. It reached No. 158 on the Billboard 200 in the United States, as well as spending 73 weeks on the Billboard Independent Albums chart, peaking at No. 5. The songs "PDA", "Obstacle 1" and the double A-side single "Say Hello to the Angels" / "NYC" were released as singles, with music videos being shot for all except "Say Hello to the Angels".

Turn On the Bright Lights received critical acclaim and was ranked among the year's best albums by several publications. Retrospectively, it is considered a seminal album of the 2000s, influencing several indie rock acts.

== Composition and writing ==
Interpol began recording Turn On the Bright Lights in October or November 2001. According to bassist Carlos Dengler, the album's songs were written before the September 11 attacks, but the attacks affected the band members deeply. Dengler said that "the unintentional meaning [the songs] take on isn't any less of a meaning; we were holding the cards to a certain message that was about to become relevant". Recording in the secluded Tarquin Studios in Bridgeport, Connecticut, with producer Peter Katis, the sessions were tense, with interpersonal conflicts amongst the band members, particularly Dengler. The band's limited time and budget also contributed to a tense atmosphere. Nevertheless, the members' different personalities contributed to the final album's sound. Attempting to recreate their live sound, the band recorded the songs live in the studio. British producer Gareth Jones helped Katis mix the album after the sessions were completed.

In a brief interview about the fifteenth anniversary of Turn On the Bright Lights, Interpol guitarist Daniel Kessler stated the album's opening track, "Untitled" was written specifically to open the band's live shows. Lead singer Paul Banks described the riff from the song as "signature Daniel".

== Promotion and release ==
The release of Turn On the Bright Lights was preceded by the marketing of the band's self-titled EP Interpol in June 2002, their first release for Matador. The EP contained three tracks: radio single "PDA", future single "NYC", and "Specialist". All three tracks later appeared on the album, with "Specialist" included as a bonus track in Australian and Japanese editions. Further promotion continued at the beginning of the following year, when the band played the 2003 NME Awards Tour alongside the Datsuns, the Polyphonic Spree and the Thrills. The song "PDA" is featured as a playable track in 2008 video game Rock Band 2.

In 2012, a remastered edition of Turn On the Bright Lights was issued to commemorate the album's tenth anniversary. The release featured a range of additional material, including early demo recordings, bonus tracks previously exclusive to international editions, and a DVD containing live performances and music videos. It also introduced five previously unreleased tracks from the band's “Third Demo” sessions, providing further insight into the development of the album's sound during its formative period.

== Critical reception ==
Professional ratings
Aggregate scores
Source	Rating
Metacritic	81/100
Review scores
Source	Rating
AllMusic	5/5 stars
Entertainment Weekly	A−
Houston Chronicle	4.5/5 stars
Los Angeles Times	3/4 stars
NME	8/10
Pitchfork	9.5/10
Record Collector	4/5 stars
Rolling Stone	3/5 stars
Slant Magazine	4.5/5 stars
The Village Voice	C+

Turn On the Bright Lights was released to critical acclaim. The album holds a score of 81 out of 100 from the aggregate site Metacritic based on 21 reviews, indicating universal acclaim. Contemporary reviews of the album often noted Interpol's influences and drew comparisons to several other acts. Michael Chamy of The Austin Chronicle cited "melodic Peter Hook-like basslines; the divine shoegazer textures of My Bloody Valentine and Ride; a peppy, Strokes-like bounce; and a singer who's a dead ringer for Ian Curtis." "It's almost as if Ian Curtis never hanged himself," began Blender's review, with critic Jonah Weiner adding that Paul Banks' vocals echoed Curtis' "gloomy moan."

NME's Victoria Segal argued that the album's "ashen atmospherics" made comparisons to Joy Division both "obvious and unmistakable," while praising Interpol's take on the "grey‑skinned British past." Billboard wrote that Interpol had created an "homage to their particular vision of the '80s that stands proudly alongside the best of its idols." Scott Seward, writing in The Village Voice, remarked that while he appreciated the band because they evoked "eating bad bathtub mescaline in the woods and listening to Cure singles," he sarcastically acknowledged that others "might like them for completely different reasons."

Noel Murray of The A.V. Club opined that Interpol's virtue "lies in the way its music unfurls from pinched openings to wide-open codas", while Rob Sheffield of Rolling Stone wrote that their "sleek, melancholy sound is a thing of glacial beauty." Eric Carr of Pitchfork argued that the band had forged their own distinct sound, "a grander, more theatrical atmosphere with lush production that counters their frustrated bombast", praising Turn On the Bright Lights as "one of the most strikingly passionate records I've heard this year." However, The Village Voice's Robert Christgau, naming it "Dud of the Month" in his Consumer Guide column, felt that Interpol "exemplify and counsel disengagement, self-seeking, a luxurious cynicism," downplaying Joy Division comparisons as "too kind". Q's lukewarm assessment of the album described it as "predictably claustrophobic listening".

By the end of 2002, Turn On the Bright Lights featured on several publications' end-of-year lists, including Pitchfork, who named it the best album of the year, NME, who ranked it at No. 10, and Stylus Magazine, who ranked it at No. 5. The album placed at No. 15 on The Village Voice's year-end Pazz & Jop critics' poll.

== Legacy ==
Hailed as a seminal album of the 2000s, Turn On the Bright Lights has been cited as an influence on many indie rock bands, including the Killers, Editors, the xx, the Organ, She Wants Revenge, and others to the extent that many of these bands have been disparagingly referred to as "Interpol clones". Closely associated with 9/11-era New York City, the album has been seen as helping define 2000s indie rock, and Interpol have been cited as helping usher in the New York-born post-punk revival scene, along with contemporaries such as the Strokes, Yeah Yeah Yeahs, and TV on the Radio.

Summing up the album's impact in a review of its 2012 reissue, Matt LeMay of Pitchfork wrote: "Suggesting that this album is simply a product of its time and place is no less naive than suggesting that anyone who has ever been in love could easily write, arrange and record an amazing love song. There were a lot of good bands in New York in 2002, but only one band made this record."

In 2017, the band embarked on a worldwide tour to celebrate the album's album's 15th anniversary.

In a 2018 interview with Vice, Paul Banks stated:

"as far as ease of making it, we had years to write these songs. The longest writing period of any of your records is your debut. We formed in 1997, so it's five years, and three-and-a-half/four of playing shows and trying out that material. So it went down smoothly in the studio, and then you have all the excitement of it being your first album. It was a good time in our lives."

Drummer Sam Fogarino reflected on the album by saying:

"we were very naïve, we didn’t know how to make a record together, and we were lucky to have a good snapshot taken of who we were at the time. And we got a little more confident with every record."

== Accolades ==
Accolades for Turn On the Bright Lights
Publication	Accolade	Rank
Pitchfork	Top 100 Albums 2000–2004	3
Pitchfork	Top 200 Albums of the 2000s	20
Stylus	Top 50 Albums 2000–2005	6
Stylus	Top 100 Albums of the 2000s	20
NME	100 Greatest Albums of the Decade	8
NME	500 Greatest Albums of All Time	130
Rolling Stone	100 Best Albums of the Decade	59
Under the Radar	Top 200 Albums of the Decade	3
Beats Per Minute	Top 100 Albums of the Decade	7
Lost At Sea	2000–2009: Albums of the Decade	13
The Irish Times	Top 20 Albums of the Decade	10
Consequence of Sound	Top 100 Albums of the Decade	35
The Guardian	100 Best Albums of the 21st Century	50

== Track listing ==
All tracks are written by Paul Banks, Daniel Kessler, Carlos Dengler and Sam Fogarino.

Turn On the Bright Lights
No.	Title	Length
1.	"Untitled"	3:56
2.	"Obstacle 1"	4:11
3.	"NYC"	4:20
4.	"PDA"	4:59
5.	"Say Hello to the Angels"	4:28
6.	"Hands Away"	3:05
7.	"Obstacle 2"	3:47
8.	"Stella Was a Diver and She Was Always Down"	6:28
9.	"Roland"	3:35
10.	"The New"	6:07
11.	"Leif Erikson"	4:00
Total length:		48:56

Japanese Edition bonus tracks
No.	Title	Length
12.	"Interlude"	1:02
13.	"Specialist" (also present on the original Australian release of the album as track 12)	6:39
Total length:		56:37

=== Turn On the Bright Lights: Tenth Anniversary Edition ===
Tenth Anniversary Edition bonus disc
No.	Title	Length
1.	"Interlude" (B-side)	1:01
2.	"Specialist" (B-side)	6:40
3.	"PDA" (first demo)	4:44
4.	"Roland" (first demo)	3:44
5.	"Get the Girls/Song 5" (first demo)	3:47
6.	"Precipitate" (second demo)	5:33
7.	"Song Seven" (second demo)	4:43
8.	"A Time to Be So Small" (second demo)	5:47
9.	"Untitled" (third demo)	4:13
10.	"Stella" (third demo)	6:40
11.	"NYC" (third demo)	4:27
12.	"Leif Erikson" (third demo)	4:27
13.	"Gavilan/Cubed" (third demo)	6:49
14.	"Obstacle 2" (Peel Session)	3:54
15.	"Hands Away" (Peel Session)	3:10
16.	"The New" (Peel Session)	5:59
17.	"NYC" (Peel Session)	4:17
Total length:		79:55

Tenth Anniversary Edition bonus DVD

Live at the Mercury Lounge, NYC, NY, 5/20/2000
No.	Title	Length
1.	"Stella Was a Diver and She Was Always Down"	6:07
2.	"Precipitate"	5:25
3.	"Get the Girls/Song 5"	3:42

Live at the Troubadour, LA, CA, 9/19/2002
No.	Title	Length
4.	"Untitled"	3:46
5.	"Obstacle 1"	4:13
6.	"Precipitate"	6:36
7.	"Roland"	3:43
8.	"Stella Was a Diver and She Was Always Down"	6:10

Music Videos
No.	Title	Length
9.	"NYC"	3:40
10.	"PDA"	3:10
11.	"Obstacle 1"	3:38

Notes

- "Stella Was a Diver and She Was Always Down" is stylized in sentence case.

== Personnel ==
According to the album's liner notes:

Interpol

- Paul Banks – vocals, guitar
- Daniel Kessler – guitar, vocals on "PDA"
- Carlos D – bass guitar, keyboards
- Samuel Fogarino – drums, percussion

Audio engineers

- All songs recorded by Peter Katis at Tarquin Studios
- All songs mixed at Tarquin Studios
- Tracks 1, 2, 4, 5, 7, 9, 10 mixed by Peter Katis
- Tracks 3, 6, 8, 11 mixed by Gareth Jones
- Mastered by Greg Calbi at Sterling Sound

Design

- Sean McCabe – photography, design
- Andrew Zaeh – photography

== Charts ==
Chart performance for Turn On the Bright Lights
Chart (2002–2003)	Peak position
Australian Hitseekers Albums (ARIA)	4
French Albums (SNEP)	62
Scottish Albums (Official Charts)	78
UK Albums (OCC)	101
UK Independent Albums (Official Charts)	11
US Billboard 200	158
US Independent Albums (Billboard)	5

== Certifications and sales ==
Certifications and sales for Turn On the Bright Lights
Region	Certification	Certified units/sales
Mexico	—	20,000
United Kingdom (BPI)	Gold	138,000
United States (RIAA)	Gold	522,000
Summaries
Worldwide	—	1,000,000

== See also ==
- Album era
