= Say Hello to the Angels / NYC =

2003 single by Interpol

"Say Hello to the Angels" / "NYC"

Single by Interpol

from the album Turn on the Bright Lights
- Released: April 14, 2003
- Recorded: November 2001
- Studio: Tarquin (Bridgeport, CT)
- Genre: "Say Hello to the Angels": Indie rock; post-punk revival; dance-punk; garage rock revival; "NYC": Indie rock; post-punk revival; dream pop; slowcore
- Length: 4:28 ("Say Hello to the Angels"); 4:21 ("NYC")
- Label: Matador
- Songwriters: Paul Banks; Carlos Dengler; Sam Fogarino; Daniel Kessler
- Producers: Gareth Jones; Peter Katis

Interpol singles chronology
"Obstacle 1" (2002)	"Say Hello to the Angels" / "NYC" (2003)	"Slow Hands" (2004)

"Say Hello to the Angels" and "NYC" are two songs by American indie rock band Interpol. The tracks were released together as a double A-side 7" vinyl single on April 14, 2003, serving as the third single from their debut studio album, Turn On the Bright Lights (2002). The single peaked at number 65 on the UK Singles Chart.

== Reception ==
"NYC" has been included on several best-of lists. Consequence of Sound ranked it at number 46 on their Best Singles of the 2000s list. Pitchfork ranked it at 140 on their Top 500 Tracks of the 2000s list. Slant Magazine rated it at number 219 on their "Best Singles of the Aughts" list. Electronic musician Moby placed "NYC" as his 8th favorite track of the decade.

== Music video ==
A music video for "NYC" was produced, directed by Doug Aitken. It features the band in a montage of pictures and designs as well as footage of a park at night.

== Track listing ==
All tracks are written by Paul Banks, Daniel Kessler, Carlos Dengler and Sam Fogarino.

7" vinyl (OLE582-2)
No.	Title	Length
1.	"Say Hello to the Angels"	4:28
2.	"NYC"	4:21
Total length:		8:49

CD (OLE582-2)
No.	Title	Length
3.	"NYC (demo)"	4:28
Total length:		13:11

== Charts ==
Chart (2003)	Peak position
UK Singles (OCC)	65
UK Indie (OCC)	8
