= Nine Black Alps =

English alternative rock band

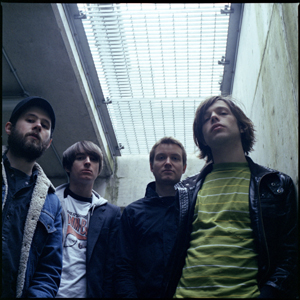
- Nine Black Alps in 2009 (From left to right: Martin Cohen, David Jones, James Galley, and Sam Forrest.)

Background information
- Origin: Manchester, England
- Genres: Alternative rock, post-grunge, power pop, indie rock, grunge
- Years active: 2003–2017
- Label: Hatch Records (2013–2017) Lost House Records (own label) (2008–2012) Island Records (2004–2007)
- Past members: Sam Forrest; David Jones; James Galley; Karl Astbury; Martin Cohen
- Website: http://www.nineblackalps.com/

Nine Black Alps were an English alternative rock band, formed in 2003 in Manchester. From 2011 onwards, the band consisted of vocalist-guitarist Sam Forrest, guitarist David Jones, drummer James Galley and bassist Karl Astbury.

Taking their name from "The Couriers" poem by Sylvia Plath, the band came to prominence with the release of their debut album, Everything Is in 2005. Following the release of the band's second album, Love/Hate (2007), the band parted ways with Island Records, and self-released their third studio album, Locked Out from the Inside in 2009.

In 2011, founding bassist/guitarist Martin Cohen departed the band to pursue a solo career under the name Milk Maid. Cohen was replaced by Astbury, with the band releasing their fourth album, Sirens in October 2012. In April 2014, Nine Black Alps released their fifth studio album Candy for the Clowns on Hatch Records.

== Career ==
From their inception in late 2003, the band's energetic live performances earned them a hardcore fanbase after playing for only a few months on the Manchester music scene. In 2004 the band signed to Island records and spent the year touring the UK and recording their first studio album with producer Rob Schnapf in Los Angeles.

In 2005, having completed the album recording, Nine Black Alps toured the UK extensively, promoting the release of their debut album, Everything Is on 13 June 2005. The band supported the Kaiser Chiefs for part of their UK tour in April 2005, and later Weezer in August. The band also performed at 2005's Glastonbury festival, T in the Park, V Festival, and the Reading and Leeds Festival. Also in 2005 Nine Black Alps performed in Japan at the winter SonicMania Festival in February, and later that year returned to play the Club Quattro Venues in Tokyo and Osaka. The band also spent time touring Northern Europe, including France, the Netherlands and Germany and also supported the Kaiser Chiefs in Scandinavia. The band also ventured to the US, playing at the South by Southwest Festival in Austin, Texas, and making a short tour of the northeast. During February 2006 Nine Black Alps set off for a final 'Everything Is' UK tour with their Manchester friends The Longcut as support. This was Nine Black Alps' largest and most successful UK tour to date, and included sold-out headline shows at Manchester Academy and an NME Shockwaves Awards Show at Hammersmith Palais.

Their first U.S. single was "Cosmopolitan"; their album Everything Is was released in the US on 28 February 2006, and to support the album release Nine Black Alps toured the US extensively during 2006, including several performances at the South by Southwest Festival in Austin, Texas and a performance at the Coachella Festival on 28 April that year.

On 18 October 2006, NME.com reported that they were working on the follow-up to Everything Is, recording with Oasis and Jet producer Dave Sardy in Los Angeles, California: "According to a posting on Nineblackalps.com the band and Dave Sardy will 'furrow their brows, vent their spleens and bleed their hearts into the production of a glorious technicolour audiophonic dreamscape'".

Nine Black Alps played on the NME Stage at Reading and Leeds Festival and Belladrum Tartan Heart Festival, Inverness-shire, in August 2007. The band's first release of 2007 came in the form of "Pocket Full of Stars", a song written by the band and Hayley Hutchinson for inclusion in the movie soundtrack to Surf's Up. The first single taken from the new album was "Burn Faster" released on 23 July and the second single, "Bitter End", was released on 15 October.

The band's second album, Love/Hate, was released on 29 October 2007.

In November 2007 Nine Black Alps supported Biffy Clyro on the Scottish leg of their UK tour and Black Rebel Motorcycle Club. On the back of this, Nine Black Alps brought the 'Love/Hate' era and their partnership with Island Records to a close with a successful UK headline tour in January and February 2008.

Having spent much of 2008 writing new material, Nine Black Alps finished recording their third full-length album in February 2009 with producer Dave Eringa in North Wales' Bryn Derwen Studio.

In April 2009, Nine Black Alps released a free download song on NME.com and their own website. The track, called 'Buy Nothing', was the first release from their forthcoming third album, Locked Out from the Inside. The band's third studio album, Locked Out from the Inside was released on 5 October 2009, and was promoted by a UK-wide tour.

In 2010, it was revealed that the band had started demoing new material for their fourth album as a 3-piece in early May in the West Yorkshire village of Linthwaite. Bass player Martin Cohen left the band in early 2011 to pursue his solo project Milk Maid, with whom he is signed to Brighton based label Fat Cat Records; he has since been replaced by Karl Astbury, formerly of The Witches. Also in 2011, David Jones became the touring second guitarist in The Cribs following the departure of Johnny Marr.

As said on their official website, "[w]e find ourselves back in the studio, a year older, wiser and rustier - recording a bunch of new songs that may or may not find their way onto some form of album."

In June 2012, it was announced that Nine Black Alps had signed with Brew Records to release their fourth studio album, Sirens.

After Brew announced that they were going to close in 2013, Nine Black Alps were announced as the first signing to new label Hatch Records, with a new single "Novokaine" released on 2 December 2013. The band's fifth album Candy for the Clowns was released in May 2014. Following a handful of shows supporting The Cribs, the band quietly disbanded.

== Members ==
Final line-up

- Sam Forrest – lead vocals, rhythm guitar, piano (2003–2017)
- David Jones – lead guitar, keyboards (2003–2017), bass (2003–2011)
- James Galley – drums, backing vocals (2003–2017)
- Karl Astbury – bass (2012–2017)

Former members

- Martin Cohen – bass, lead guitar (2003–2011)

== Discography ==
=== Albums ===
List of albums, with selected chart positions
| Title | Album details | Peak chart positions | | | |
| Title | Album details | UK | UK Rock | SCO | US Heat |
|---|---|---|---|---|---|
| Everything Is | Released: 13 June 2005; Labels: Island Records | 51 | 3 | 66 | 19 |
| Love/Hate | Released: 29 October 2007; Labels: Island Records | 69 | — | 94 | — |
| Locked Out from the Inside | Released: 5 October 2009; Labels: Lost House Records | — | — | — | — |
| Sirens | Released: 8 October 2012; Labels: Brew Records | — | — | — | — |
| Candy for the Clowns | Released: 6 May 2014; Labels: Hatch | — | 35 | — | — |
"—" denotes releases that did not chart.

==== EPs ====
List of EPs, with selected chart positions
| Title | EP details | Peak chart positions | |
| Title | EP details | UK Budget | UK Rock |
|---|---|---|---|
| Shot Down EP | Released 2005 | — | — |
| Nine Black Alps | Released: 12 July 2005; Labels: Tiny Evil | — | — |
| Glitter Gulch EP | Released: 15 March 2006; Labels: Island Records | 14 | 5 |
"—" denotes releases that did not chart.

=== Singles ===
List of singles, with selected chart positions, showing year released and album name
| Title | Year | Peak chart positions | | | | Album |
| Title | Year | UK | UK Indie | UK Rock | SCO | Album |
|---|---|---|---|---|---|---|
| "Cosmopolitan" | 2004 | 101 | 22 | — | — | Everything Is |
| "Shot Down" | 2005 | 25 | — | — | 34 | Everything Is |
| "Not Everyone" | 2005 | 31 | — | — | 38 | Everything Is |
| "Unsatisfied" | 2005 | 30 | — | 1 | 30 | Everything Is |
| "Just Friends" | 2005 | 52 | — | 1 | 55 | Everything Is |
| "Burn Faster" | 2007 | 42 | — | — | 17 | Love/Hate |
| "Bitter End" | 2007 | — | — | — | — | Love/Hate |
| "Buy Nothing" | 2009 | — | — | — | — | Locked Out from the Inside |
| "My One and Only" | 2012 | — | — | — | — | Sirens |
| "Novokaine" | 2013 | — | — | — | — | Candy for the Clowns |
| "Supermarket Clothes" | 2014 | — | — | — | — | Candy for the Clowns |
"—" denotes releases that did not chart.

==== Soundtracks and compilations ====
- "Surf's Up: Music From The Motion Picture" (Pocket Full of Stars)
- "Class aA: Beyond Entertainment" (Over the Ocean)
- SSX on tour Soundtrack (Shot Down)
- Burnout:Revenge Soundtrack (Shot Down)
- FlatOut 2 [Xbox Version] Soundtrack (Cosmopolitan)
- Midnight Club 3 Dub Edition Remix Soundtrack (Not Everyone)
- FIFA06 (Cosmopolitan)
- Madden 06 (Cosmopolitan)
