= Sam Forrest =

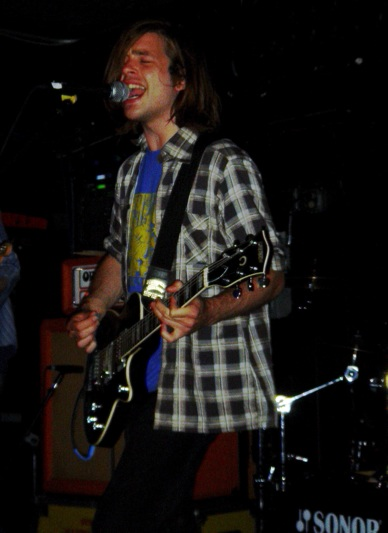
- Sam Forrest performing with Nine Black Alps.

Background information
- Born: 22 October 1977 (age 49); York, England
- Occupations: Musician, vocalist
- Instruments: Vocals, guitar, bass
- Label: Desert Mine Music
- Website: Official website

Samuel Forrest (born 22 October, 1977) is an English singer-songwriter, best known as the frontman of Nine Black Alps. He also co-fronts The Sorry Kisses with Hayley Hutchinson and previously played bass in the York-based group, The Halcyon Band. As of late 2026, Forrest is still making solo albums, alongside performing and recording with Sewage Farm, Strange Pink and The Sorry Kisses.

== Solo Career ==
Forrest has previously released six solo albums, Down the Hillside, Paper Crown, No Imagination, The Edge Of Nowhere, Population 4000 and Candlelightwater on Desert Mine Music.

== Post-Nine Black Alps ==
In 2016, Forrest formed a new band called Sewage Farm with bass player Danny Trew Barton and drummer Danny Hirst. The band released their debut album, Cloudy, on Desert Mine Music in November 2016.

Currently, Forrest has two active rock bands, the first being Sewage Farm. That band released the EP, Mould in 2023, via Safe Suburban Home Records with reviews coming in from Janglepophub and others. To mark the release, Forrest was also interviewed by Soundsphere magazine, about his career, and previous musical acts. The second active band is Strange Pink, that group performed its debut show at The New Adelphi Club in Kingston Upon Hull on 9 March 2024.

== 2024-present: Sewage Farm, The Sorry Kisses, Strange Pink and solo albums ==
As of 2024, Forrest released a new solo album, Caught Under A Spell.

Strange Pink released a debut single on 23 May 2025, called Pencil Chewer, and an EP, named Out of Focus, was also announced to be released in August that year. Early support came from Steve Lamacq at BBC Radio 6 Music, Jericho Keys at BBC Music Introducing, Amazing Radio, and others. The band features Eddie Alan Logie on bass and backing vocals, Dom Smith on drums and Forrest on vocals and guitar. Out of Focus was released on 22 August 2025 via the Hull-based indie label, Forever Underdogs. Upon release, the EP was favourably reviewed online by FLEX, No Transmission, Aural Aggravation and other music blogs. In November 2025, Strange Pink released two remixes (via York-based electro-indie label, Attention Economy Recordings) for the songs Pencil Chewer, and Boys Club under the title, Pictures of Strangers. The remixes were created by Officers (Pencil Chewer) and bdrmm (Boys Club).

In July 2025, Forrest released his latest solo album, Summer Hits.

In April of 2026, Forrest released a new album with Sewage Farm, it was reviewed favourably by Whisperin' And Hollerin'. In August of the same year, Strange Pink made their first appearance at Hull's Humber Street Sesh festival, preceded by a new single, Sculcoates. Simon Le Bon of Duran Duran and Katy Krassner played the track (Sculcoates) on their “WHOOOSH!” radio show on Sirius XM. Strange Pink also announced a second EP, Guest Room. In addition, Forrest and Hutchinson shared new music as The Sorry Kisses, with an album titled, Forever In A Memory, including a new song, Goodbye Jenny. The album was released on October 16, 2026.

Following the release of Strange Pink's Guest Room EP on October 23, 2026, Mickey Bradley (of The Undertones) played the single, Gone Already on BBC Radio Foyle.

== Discography ==
- Down the Hillside (2008)
- Paper Crown (2009)
- No Imagination (2010)
- The Edge Of Nowhere (2012)
- Population 4000 (2013)
- Candlelightwater (2015)
- Caught Under A Spell (2024)
- Summer Hits (2025)
