= Afropunk Festival =

American black music festival

Coordinates: 40.697104°N 73.979037°W

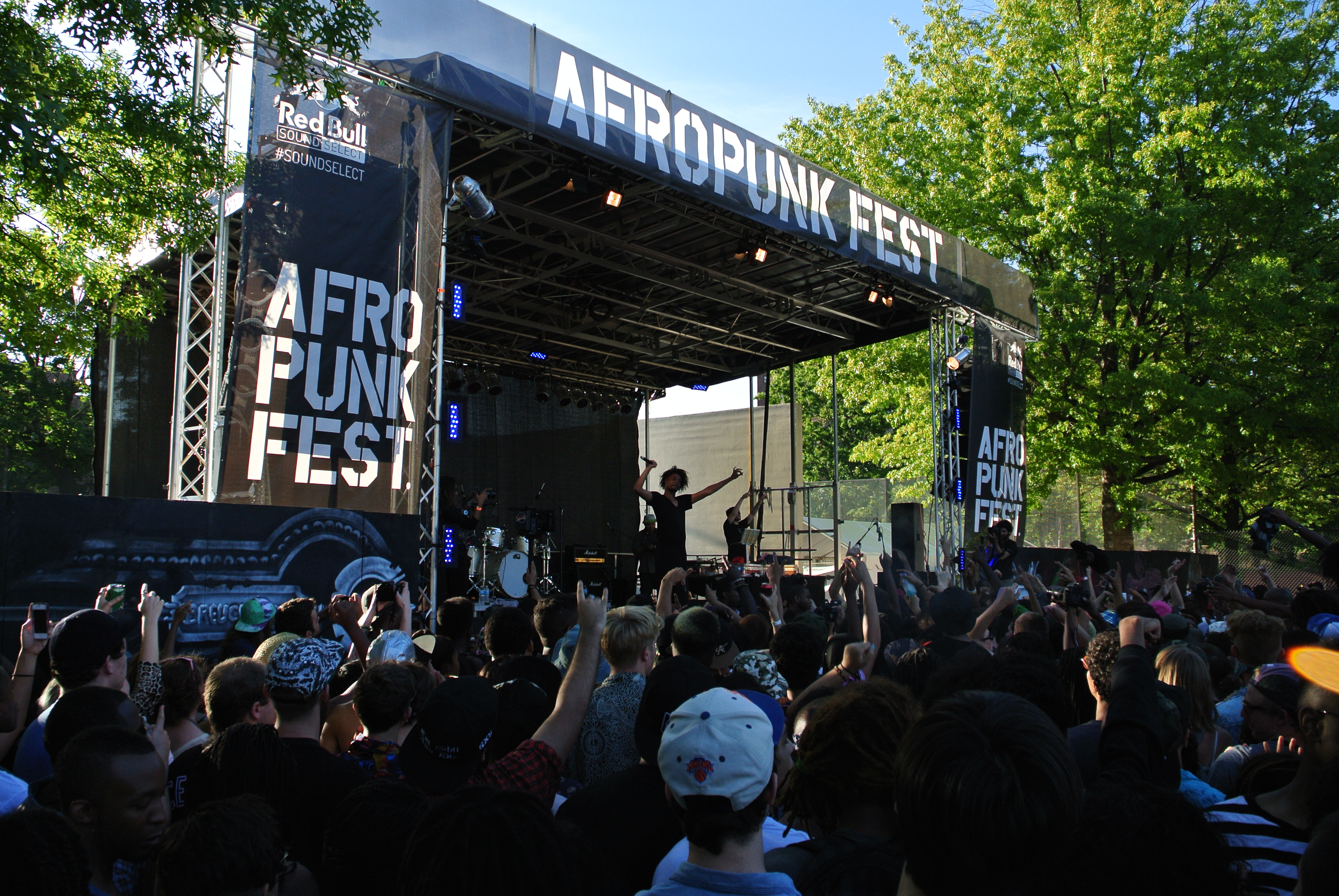
- 2013 Afropunk Festival
- Years active: 2005-Present

The Afropunk Festival began in 2005, at the Brooklyn Academy of Music in New York. By 2018, Afropunk Festivals had also been held in various major cities, including Atlanta, London, Salvador, Dakar, and Johannesburg. The festival was co-founded by James Spooner and Matthew Morgan, and grew out of the 2003 documentary titled Afro-Punk which studied black punk rock musicians across America.

== History ==
=== 2005–2008 ===
The festival was targeted towards black alternative-minded punks and supported by The Brooklyn Academy of Music. As the festival grew and the music industry became more diverse, the musical curation shifted towards reaching a broader black audience and the festival also began charging an admission fee. Due to festival alterations that deviated from the original Afropunk culture, former co-founder, James Spooner ended his involvement in 2008.

=== 2009–2019 ===
Jocelyn A. Cooper became involved with the festival in 2009. Afropunk Festival grew to hundreds and thousands of attendees, expanding into the cities of Atlanta, Paris, London, Johannesburg South Africa, Salvador, Brazil, Miami, and Minneapolis. Some notable artist performances by FKA Twigs, Tyler, the Creator, and Erykah Badu, set a new standard for the impression made by the festival.

Afropunk 2019's lineup also featured celebrated artists such as Jill Scott, Tierra Whack, Rico Nasty, and EarthGang, further amplifying the festival's reputation as a space for diverse and radical Black expression. In addition to musical acts, the event provided a platform for activism, beauty showcases, and photobooths that enriched the overall experience.

=== 2020-Present ===
Afropunk is acquired by entrepreneur Richelieu Dennis and Essence Ventures. The festival adapted to the COVID-19 pandemic by hosting its first virtual event in 2020, branded as Planet Afropunk: Past, Present, and Future is Black. This virtual edition, held from October 23 to 25, showcased global talent and tackled critical socio-political issues. The lineup included artists like Ari Lennox, Meshell Ndegeocello, Moses Sumney, serpentwithfeet, and Tiwa Savage. Alongside performances, it featured virtual art galleries, Black hair showcases, and discussions on topics such as systemic racism, prison reform, and the criminal justice system. Attendees were encouraged to donate to organizations such as Color of Change and the Equal Justice Initiative.

== Criticisms ==
Having emerged from political punk roots, Afropunk Festival has faced criticism at times, including backlash over booking artists such as M.I.A., Ice Cube and Tyler the Creator.

Attendees have also critiqued the values of Afropunk's organizers surrounding LGBTQ concerns, treatment of employees, and its corporate leanings. Some attendees critique the festival for appealing to white audiences, including an instance of attendees being removed from an area of the festival for wearing a homemade t-shirt critical of the event. In August 2018, Afropunk's Editor-In-Chief resigned after over a decade of work for Afropunk citing mistreatment and a corporate agenda he labeled "performative activism".

== Performers ==
=== Brooklyn, July 4, 2005 ===
- Saul Williams
- Living Colour
- Tamar-kali
- Cipher
- Honeychild Coleman

=== Brooklyn, June 30-July 4, 2006 ===
- Cipher
- Honey Child
- Tamar Kali

=== Brooklyn, June 29-July 7, 2007 ===
- Apes
- Bear in Wolf Fur
- Cx Kidtronic
- Cutlery
- Dragons of Zynth
- The Drugstore Cowboys
- Ellul
- The Exit
- Game Rebellion
- Mighty Fine
- No Surrender
- The Objex
- Philmoore Browne
- Rich Medina
- Stephannie McKay
- The Smyrk
- Suffrajett
- Taylor McFerrin
- Tiombe Lockhart
- Whole Wheat Bread

=== Brooklyn, July 5-13, 2008 ===
- Afrika Bambaataa
- Janelle Monae
- The Apes
- Shawn Hewitt
- Millsted
- The Five One
- No Surrender
- Jen Militia
- P.O.S.
- Hollywood Holt
- Tim Williams
- Shala
- Proton
- Sky hy
- Echo Jinx
- Whole Wheat Bread
- Disaster Us
- LIke Gravitiy
- Cutlery
- McRad
- Planety Ubiquity
- Voodoo Fee
- Lets Go To Wear
- Bazaar Royale
- Game Rebellion
- Bone Crusher
- The Noisettes
- The Dirtbombs
- DJ Hard Hittin Harry
- Sophia Ramos
- Bermuda
- Little Jackie
- Tamar Kali
- The Caesarz
- The Carps
- J*Davey
- Kudu
- Arthur Baker
- Rich Medina
- The Dustbin Brothers

=== Brooklyn, July 3–8, 2009 ===
- Pure Hell
- Whole Wheat Bread
- American Fangs
- Game Rebellion
- The Objex
- Joya Bravo
- Living Colour
- Earl Grey Hound
- Tamar Kali
- The London Souls
- Apollo Heights
- Sabatta
- Saul Williams
- Janelle Monáe
- The Dallas Austin Experience
- Elevator Fight
- Chewing Pic's
- Peekaboo Theory
- Blackie

=== Brooklyn, June 25–27, 2010 ===
- Bad Brains
- P.O.S
- God Forbid
- Ninjasonik
- The 54
- Cipher
- Game Rebellion
- The Bots
- Belikos
- Activator
- DJ MU$A
- DJ D://BOI
- Mos Def
- 24-7 Spyz
- J*DaVeY
- The Cool Kids
- Martin Luther
- K-OS
- The Memorials
- Bad Rabbits
- Galaxy of Tar

=== 2011 cancelation ===
Cancelled due to Hurricane Irene.

=== Brooklyn, August 25–26, 2012 ===
- Reggie Watts
- Janelle Monáe
- Erykah Badu
- Gym Class Heroes
- Straight Line Stitch
- DJ Smoke L.E.S.
- Joe Jordan's Experiment
- The Supasonics
- E.Z. Mo Breezy of Grits & Biscuits
- Purple Ferdinand
- Flatbush Zombies
- Sinkane
- Venus x GHE20 G0TH1K
- TV On The Radio
- Oxymorron
- Alice Smith
- Tess
- Roofeeo
- Stack-Aly
- Inky Jack
- Radkey
- Toshi Reagon and BIGLovely
- Ninjasonik
- The Memorials
- Spank Rock
- The Skins
- Cerebal Ballzy
- Gordon Voidwell
- Bad Rabbits
- Toro Y Moi
- Das Racist
- Phony Ppl
- Body Language

=== Brooklyn, August 24–25, 2013 ===
- Wicked Wisdom
- Living Colour
- Roofeo
- DJ mOma
- Chuck D & DJ Lord
- ?uestlove
- Death
- The Heavy
- Trash Talk
- Danny Brown
- Saul Williams
- Theophilus London
- Vintage Trouble
- The London Souls
- The Coup
- Mykki Blanco
- k-os
- Big Freedia
- Rye Rye
- Le1f
- Jean Grae
- CX KIDTRONIK
- The Dust Rays
- The Skins
- MEAΔTLOAF MUZIK
- Rebelmatic
- Unlocking the Truth
- Sunny Gang
- Pyyramids
- MikeQ
- Mess Kid
- The White Mandingos
- Sebastian
- DJ Mr. Hernandez
- PatPervert
- Mursi Layne
- UNIIQU3
- J Lamar
- Small Axe
- Stack-Aly
- Prince Paul
- Mick Collins
- Larry B
- Teachers

=== Brooklyn, August 23–24, 2014 ===
- Sharon Jones & the Dap Kings
- D'Angelo
- Lianne La Havas
- Trash Talk
- Meshell Ndegeocello
- Body Count
- Valerie June
- SZA
- Cro-Mags
- Alice Smith
- The Internet
- Tamar-kali
- Straight Line Stitch
- Fishbone
- King Britt
- Bad Brains
- The Bots
- Cakes da Killa
- The Tontons
- Denitia and Sene
- Gordon Voidwell
- Loaf Muzik
- Ho99o9
- Princess Nokia
- Shabazz Palaces
- Clipping.
- DJ SLIINK
- THEEsatisfaction
- A Tribe Called Red
- LOLAWOLF
- Activator
- Unlocking the Truth
- The Wilding Incident
- Baby Baby
- Sunny Gang
- AFRICA LATINA
- Lonely Horse
- SEWER RATS BK
- The oOoh Baby Gimme Mores
- TECLA
- Junior Astronomers
- Kandace Springs
- BLXPLTN
- Cipher
- DJ mOma
- MikeQ
- UNIIQU3
- Jasmine Solano and MeLo-X
- Mista Selecta + Mane Squeeze
- Papi Juice
- Byrell The Great
- DJ Dhundee
- Juliana Huxtable
- Roofeeo
- Gianni Lee
- Dub-Stuy Sound System
- CX KIDTRONiiK
- DJ Underdog
- $1 Bin
- Beverly Bond
- Blaqstarr + Smallwood
- Pat Pervert
- AfterThem

=== Brooklyn, August 22–23, 2015 ===
- Lenny Kravitz
- Grace Jones
- Kelis
- Suicidal Tendencies
- Kele
- Thundercat
- Danny Brown
- Cakes Da Killa
- Lion Babe
- GoldLink
- Sam Dew
- Raury
- Petite Noir
- Young Paris
- Adia Victoria
- Curtis Harding
- Kaytranada
- Everyday people
- Soulection
- Mobile Mondays
- MikeQ
- Brenmar
- UNIIQU3
- Nadus
- Papi Juice
- WC Kids
- Palaceburn

=== Brooklyn, August 27–28, 2016 ===
- Ice Cube
- Tyler, The Creator
- Flying Lotus
- Janelle Monáe
- The Internet
- Skunk Anansie
- Laura Mvula
- Young Fathers
- Benjamin Booker
- Skye & Ross from Morcheeba
- Earl Sweatshirt
- George Clinton
- Thundercat
- Shabazz Palaces
- Saul Williams
- PowerJam Living Colour, Fishbone, Bad Brains
- Ceelo Green
- Angel Haze
- Kelela
- Trash Talk
- Ho99o9
- Gallant
- Prayers
- Radkey
- Seinabo Sey
- The Suffers
- Sate
- Downtown Boys
- In The Whale
- Roman GianArthur
- Xavier Omar
- BLXPLTN
- Sir The Baptist
- The VeeVees
- Tank and the Bangas
- Qaasim and the Juggernaut War Party
- Sango
- Esta
- Roofeeo
- DJ Moma
- Juliana Huxtable
- Larry B
- The Whooligan
- Joe Kay
- Yaadcore
- Spank Rock
- Lsdxoxo
- CX Kidtronic
- DJ Lindsey
- DJ Dhundee
- Underdog
- PBDY
- Mono/Poly
- Ras G
- Blkkmorris

=== Brooklyn, August 26–27, 2017 ===
- Soul II Soul
- Sampha
- Thundercat
- Kaytranada
- Dizzee Rascal
- Gary Clark Jr.
- Macy Gray
- SZA
- Jojo Abot

=== Paris, July 14–15, 2018 ===
- SZA
- D'Angelo
- Wizkid
- Damian Marley
- Gary Clark Jr.
- Trombone Shorty & New Orleans Avenue
- GoldLink
- Davido
- Nneka
- Sandra Nkaké
- Mahalia
- Ecca Vandal
- Estere
- The NoFace
- Anais B
- Cheetah
- Queen CI
- Manare
- Mo Laudi
- Pllow
- Rokia Bamba

=== Brooklyn, August 25–26, 2018 ===
- Erykah Badu
- Tyler, the Creator
- Miguel
- Janelle Monáe
- The Internet
- Twin Shadow
- Ibeyi
- H.E.R.
- Lolawolf
- Daniel Caesar
- Wicked Wisdom
- Jaden Smith
- Willow Smith
- Trash Talk
- Fever 333
- Denzel Curry
- Smino
- Solange Knowles
- Fantastic Negrito
- Lion Babe
- Jamila Woods
- Jessie Reyez
- Mahalia
- Nakhane
- JPEGMafia
- Duckwrth
- Nova Twins
- Sho Madjozi
- Manthe Ribane
- Youthman
- Black Pantera

=== Atlanta, October 13–14, 2018 ===
- N.E.R.D.
- The Internet
- Wicked Wisdom
- Benjamin Booker
- Noname
- Little Simz
- serpentwithfeet
- Gaika
- Yves Tumor
- Kari Faux

=== Johannesburg, December 30–31, 2018 ===
- The Internet
- Kaytranada
- Public Enemy
- Flying Lotus
- Thundercat
- Thandiswa Mazwai
- Moonchild Sanelly
- YoungstaCPT

=== Paris, July 13–14, 2019 ===
- Solange Knowles
- Janelle Monáe
- Masego
- Ibeyi
- Lizzo
- IAMDDB
- Tiwa Savage
- Maleek Berry
- Burna Boy
- Rico Nasty
- Tank and the Bangas
- Samurai Shotgun
- Anais B
- Muzi
- BAMBII
- Black Square Club

=== Brooklyn, August 24–25, 2019 ===
- Jill Scott
- FKA Twigs
- Leon Bridges
- Brittany Howard
- Kamasi Washington
- Gary Clark Jr.
- Santigold
- Lianne La Havas
- GoldLink
- Toro y Moi
- Nao
- Death Grips
- Ho99o9
- Danny Brown
- Tierra Whack
- IAMDDB
- JID
- Ravyn Lenae
- Kelsey Lu
- Masego
- Leikeli47
- Rico Nasty
- Scarlxrd
- Thandiswa Mazwai
- EarthGang
- Kari Faux
- Burnt Sugar the Arkestra Chamber
- Fire From The Gods
- Tank and the Bangas
- Junglepussy
- Rahbi
- The Suffers
- Hyro the Hero
- Alxndr London
- Hello Yello
- Chika
- Rebelmatic
- Samurai Shotgun
- BCUC
- Upchuck
- Red Arkade
- babygotbacktalk
- Anahata
- Black Haüs
- BYHAZE
- Fade Em All
- Vibe World Order
- Soulection
- MikeQ
- DJ Moma
- UNIIQU3
- Rich Medina
- DJ Kenzhero
- Rudeboyz
- BAMBII
- Papi Juice
- Lsdxoxo
- Muzi
- DOOWAP
- Batekoo
- DJ Nativesun
- Boston Chery
- Underground System
- BMAJR
- BAE BAE
- GABSOUL

=== Atlanta, October 12–13, 2019 ===
- Anderson .Paak & The Free Nationals
- FKA twigs
- Danny Brown
- Fever 333
- Gallant
- Smino
- SiR
- EarthGang
- Masego
- Leikeli47
- Mahalia
- Ravyn Lenae
- Fantastic Negrito
- Cautious Clay
- Lucky Daye
- Louder Than Quiet
- Sho Madjozi
- Duckwrth
- Upchuck

=== Johannesburg, December 30–31, 2019 ===
- Solange
- Miguel
- Masego
- Goldlink
- Nao
- Sjava
- Sho Madjozi
- Kwani Experience
- Urban Village
- Zoe Modiga
- Blinky Bill
- Morena Leraba
- Darkie Fiction
- TCIYF
- Umlilo
- House of Diamonds
- House of Reve
- Jazzidisciples
- DJ Kenzhero
- DBN Gogo
- Batekoo
- Gina Jeanz
- Zara Julius
- Lelowhatsgood
- Fif_laaa

=== Virtual, October 23–25, 2020 ===
- Afrobapho
- Afrocidade feat. Majur and Mahal Pita
- Ari Lennox
- Arka'n Asrafokor
- ASIATICA
- ÀTTØØXXÁ feat. Hiran
- Balimaya Project
- Blac Rabbit
- BLACK HAÜS
- Bongeziwe Mabandla
- Bootsy Collins
- Common
- DJ Poison Ivy
- DJ Ruckus
- Dua Saleh
- Duckwrth
- DUMA
- Duo B.A.V.I.
- Durand Bernarr
- Ecko Bazz
- Elaine
- Jahmed
- Johnny Cradle
- Jonah Mutono
- KIRBY
- Larissa Luz + Carlinhos Brown
- Loshh
- Lous and the Yakuza
- Masego
- Mayra Andrade
- MC Yallah
- Mereba
- Meshell N’Dege Ocello
- Moonchild Sanelly
- Moonga K.
- Moses Sumney
- Muneyi
- Muzi
- Nêssa
- Rebelmatic
- Sampa The Great
- serpentwithfeet
- Smino
- Solo Ntsizwa Ka Mthimkhulu
- Songhoy Blues
- T. Nava
- Tawiah
- TCIYF
- The Veldt
- Theon Cross
- Tiana Major9
- Tiwa Savage
- Tobe Nwigwe
- Tomi Agape
- TrapFunk & Alívio
- Ukhoikhoi
- Virus
- Yan Cloud
- Yves Tumor

=== Atlanta, September 25–26, 2021 ===
- VanJess
- Baby Tate
- Wale
- Smino
- Rico Nasty
- KP the Great and Friends
- Tems
- Fousheé
- serpentwithfeet
- Tkay Maidza
- AMINDI
- Liv.e
- HOLLOW SINATRA
- LESIBU GRAND
- BLKKMORRIS
- JSport
- OHSO
- 10th letter
- Divine Interface
- Sofa King Evil
- Kashii

=== Miami, May 20–22, 2022 ===
- Stonebwoy
- Skillibeng
- Michaël Brun & Friends
- ChocQuibTown
- Yendry
- Mavado
- Ebhoni
- Prettyboy D-O
- Silent Addy
- Walshy Fire
- Bambii
- Cool Blaze
- JAI

=== Minneapolis, June 18–19, 2022 ===
- Ari Lennox
- Noname
- Mereba
- Sango
- Dreamer Isioma
- Miloe
- Pink Siifu
- MMYYKK & the Blackbeat Theory
- Ricki Monique
- Papa Mbye
- Blood $moke Body
- Essjay the Afrocentric Ratchet
- killusonline
- EVV
- Yasmeenah
- Kwey

=== Brooklyn, September 10–11, 2022 ===
- Burna Boy
- Lyric Michelle
- Doechii
- Kaleta & Super Yamba Band
- Spinall
- Pawpaw Rod
- Earl Sweatshirt
- The Roots
- Isaiah Rashad
- Freddie Gibbs
- Lucky Daye
- Tierra Whack
- Butcher Brown
- James Mantis
- Adekunle Gold
- ZHARIAH
- Mick Jenkins
- Bbymutha
- Fana Hues
- Pink Siifu
- Kah-Lo
- Ambré
- Cruza
- Alex Mali
- Ivy Sole
- YahZarah
- Talia Goddess
- Ekkstacy
- Jany
- Rodney Chrome
- WiFiOG
- Sydney Love
- Moresoupplease
- KITTYSAYWORD
- Earry Hall
- Brian Henry
- Bonita Appleblunt
- NOS

=== Bahia, November 26–27, 2022 ===
- Ludmilla
- Rayssa Dias
- Young Piva
- Baile Favelle
- N.I.N.A.
- Paulilo Paredao
- Margareth Menezes
- Emicida
- A Dama featuring MC Carol
- Baco
- Liniker
- Black Pantera
- ÀTTØØXXÁ & Karol Conka
- Psirico
- Mart'Nalia & Larissa Luz convidam Nelson Rufino
- Nic Dias
- Ministereo Publico Sound System
- Yan Cloud
- Dawer x Damper
- Masego

=== Manhattan, February 24–25, 2023 ===
- Mahogany L. Browne
- Aja Monet
- Celisse
- Danielle Ponder
- India Arie
- Ebony Williams
- Sarah Jones
- Umi
- Mereba

=== Brooklyn, August 26–27, 2023 ===
- Teyana Taylor
- Flying Lotus
- Joey Badass
- Vince Staples
- Tobe Nwigwe
- Baby Tate
- Durand Bernarr
- Sudan Archives
- The Beatnuts
- Dreamer Isioma
- Amindi
- Enny
- Rahzel
- Madison McFerrin
- Jack Freeman
- Iniko
- DBN Gogo
- Akwaeke Emezi
- Proper.
- Cleo Reed
- Dawer x Damper
- King Isis
- Uniity
- The Soapbox Presents
- Bembona
- Winter Wolf
- The Rack
- DJ SNS
- Stonie Blue
- DJ Mohogany
- Wemi

=== Brooklyn, August 23–24, 2024 ===
- Amari Marshall
- House of Juicy Couture
- Breezy Supreme
- Hue
- Winter Wolf
- Jenny Hates Techno
- Phunky Nomads
- Rebelmatic
- DJ Moma
- Durand Bernarr
- Larissa Luz
- Erykah Badu
