= James Spooner =

American film director, graphic novelist, tattoo artist

- Born: 1976 (age 49–50)
- Occupations: Film Director; Tattoo Artist; Author; Graphic Novelist
- Website: spoonersnofun.com

James Spooner is an American filmmaker, tattoo artist, and graphic novelist. He is best known for directing the documentary Afro-Punk (2003), co-founding the Afropunk Festival, and creating the graphic memoir The High Desert: Black. Punk. Nowhere. (2022). He co-edited the anthology Black Punk Now (2023) and is the author of the memoir It Starts with Anger: A Punk Beginning. An AfroPunk Ending. (2026).

== Early life and education ==
James Spooner was born in 1976 in Jersey City, New Jersey. His father, of Saint Lucian descent, was a professional bodybuilder and former Mr. America, while his mother was a special education teacher.

He grew up in Apple Valley, California and later in New York City. He attended Apple Valley High School and later LaGuardia High School of Music & Art and Performing Arts.

In his youth, Spooner was drawn to punk rock—listening to bands like the Sex Pistols, Black Flag, and Misfits—and started exploring the subculture at a young age.

== Career ==
=== Early artistic & music ventures ===
Spooner founded the record label Kidney Room Records, which released several records including Frail’s Idle Hands Hold Nothing, a split single by Elements of Need and Jasmine, and a single from Swing Kids.

He also worked as a host at On!, a late-night event in New York City.

In 2021, he appeared in the Broad’s documentary series Time Decorated: The Musical Influences of Jean-Michel Basquiat.

=== Film & Afropunk movement ===
Spooner directed Afro-Punk (2003), a documentary exploring race, identity, and punk subculture among Black Americans. The film premiered at the 2003 Toronto International Film Festival. In the spirit of DIY principles, Spooner toured the film extensively, screening it over 300 times at colleges and festivals across the U.S. in the first year.

The film received the Henry Hampton Award for Excellence in Documentary Filmmaking at the 2003 Roxbury Film Festival and Best Feature Length Documentary at the 2004 Jamerican Film Festival. It also received the Audience Award at the 2005 Black Harvest Film Festival.

Following the release of Afro-Punk, audiences began identifying themselves as "Afropunks", adopting the term to describe their experiences as Black participants in predominantly white punk and alternative music scenes. Spooner subsequently organized a series of DIY underground punk shows known as the "Liberation Sessions", which preceded the establishment of the Afropunk Festival.

Spooner also created a website for the film that included a message board, which grew to several thousand members and connected Black punks around the world. The online community helped lead to in-person gatherings and the first Afropunk Festival.

Spooner co-founded the Afropunk Festival in 2005 with Matthew Morgan in Brooklyn. The festival expanded internationally, with editions in Atlanta, London, Paris, Salvador Brazil, and Johannesburg.

The broader Afropunk movement and aesthetic later served as a central inspiration for the 2022 stop-motion animated film Wendell & Wild, which featured an Afropunk protagonist and a soundtrack curated around Black punk artists, including the Afro-Punk documentary's theme song and subject Tamar-kali.

In 2008, Spooner departed from the festival, citing philosophical and creative differences over its evolving direction.

In 2026, after a years-long legal dispute, Spooner regained the rights to Afro-Punk and released a remastered version.

He also directed the narrative film White Lies, Black Sheep (2007), which premiered at the Toronto International Film Festival.

=== Literary career ===
In 2022, Spooner published The High Desert: Black. Punk. Nowhere. (Harper Collins), his first graphic memoir. Blending memoir and comics, the book chronicles Spooner's coming of age in the High Desert of Southern California, where he discovered punk music and began to navigate questions of race, identity, and belonging in a predominantly white punk scene. The memoir traces the formative experiences that would later inform his work as the director of Afro-Punk and his involvement in the Afropunk movement. NPR described the book as an exploration of how punk gave Spooner a sense of identity and belonging.

In 2023, Spooner co-edited Black Punk Now (Soft Skull Press) with Chris L. Terry, an anthology of fiction, nonfiction, comics, and other work by Black punk artists and writers. NPR's Code Switch featured Spooner discussing the anthology and the continuing role of Black punk communities.

In 2026, Spooner published the memoir It Starts with Anger: A Punk Beginning. An AfroPunk Ending. (Pantheon), an account of the experiences that shaped his work as a filmmaker and his role in the development of Afropunk. The memoir follows his adolescence in Southern California and his years in New York City's punk and club scenes, where he grappled with race, identity, and belonging as a Black punk. It traces the experiences that led Spooner to create the 2003 documentary Afro-Punk, which in turn helped inspire a wider community and the later Afropunk festival. It also addresses Spooner's relationship to Afropunk and his departure from the festival and organization as they became increasingly commercialized. The book combines memoir with Spooner's illustrations, comics, and punk ephemera.

== Critical Reception ==
The High Desert received positive reviews from both mainstream and comics-focused publications. The Washington Post included it among its ten best graphic novels of 2022, while the Los Angeles Times praised its depiction of race, identity, and cross-racial experiences. Publishers Weekly gave the book a starred review, describing it as an emotionally intense coming-of-age story about Spooner's adolescence and his discovery of punk culture. Kirkus Reviews also gave the book a starred review, calling it a heartfelt memoir of growing up as a Black punk rocker in rural California. The High Desert received the 2023 Alex Award from the American Library Association, recognizing adult books with particular appeal to young readers. It also won the 2023 Cartoonist Studio Prize for Best Print Comic.

Black Punk Now, co-edited by Spooner and Chris L. Terry, was also positively received. The Nation described the anthology as an effort to document a lesser-known part of the punk community and praised its collection of fiction, nonfiction, illustrations, and comics. Pitchfork included the book on its list of the ten best music books of 2023, while The Guardian included it among its five best music books of the year. Kirkus Reviews also awarded the anthology a starred review, praising its range of genres and exploration of the intersections between Black identity and punk culture.

It Starts with Anger: A Punk Beginning. An AfroPunk Ending. received substantial coverage following its publication in 2026. Publishers Weekly reviewed the memoir favorably, highlighting its account of Spooner's adolescence in Southern California, his experiences in the New York punk scene, and the origins of Afro-Punk. NPR's On Point devoted an hour-long program to Spooner and the history of Black punk, discussing the experiences described in the memoir and Spooner's role in bringing Afro-punk into wider public awareness. The Los Angeles Times also covered the publication of the memoir alongside the rerelease of the restored Afro-Punk documentary.

== Personal life ==
Spooner practices a vegan lifestyle and is known for pioneering vegan-friendly tattoo methods at his tattoo studio, Monocle Tattoo. He lives in Los Angeles with his wife, Lisa Nola, and daughter. He continues to screen Afro-Punk and give talks and presentations about punk, comics, and Black identity at universities, libraries, and other cultural institutions.

== Filmography ==
=== Feature films ===
Year	Title	Director	Writer	Producer	Cinematographer	Editor
2003	Afro-Punk	yes	no	yes	yes	yes
2007	White Lies, Black Sheep	yes	yes	yes	no	yes

== Publications ==
=== Books ===
Title	Year	Notes
It Starts with Anger: A Punk Beginning. An AfroPunk Ending.	2026	Mixed graphic and print memoir
The High Desert: Black. Punk. Nowhere.	2022	Graphic memoir
Black Punk Now (co-edited with Chris L. Terry)	2023	Anthology of essays and stories
