= Simi Sernaker =

American singer-songwriter, musician and artist

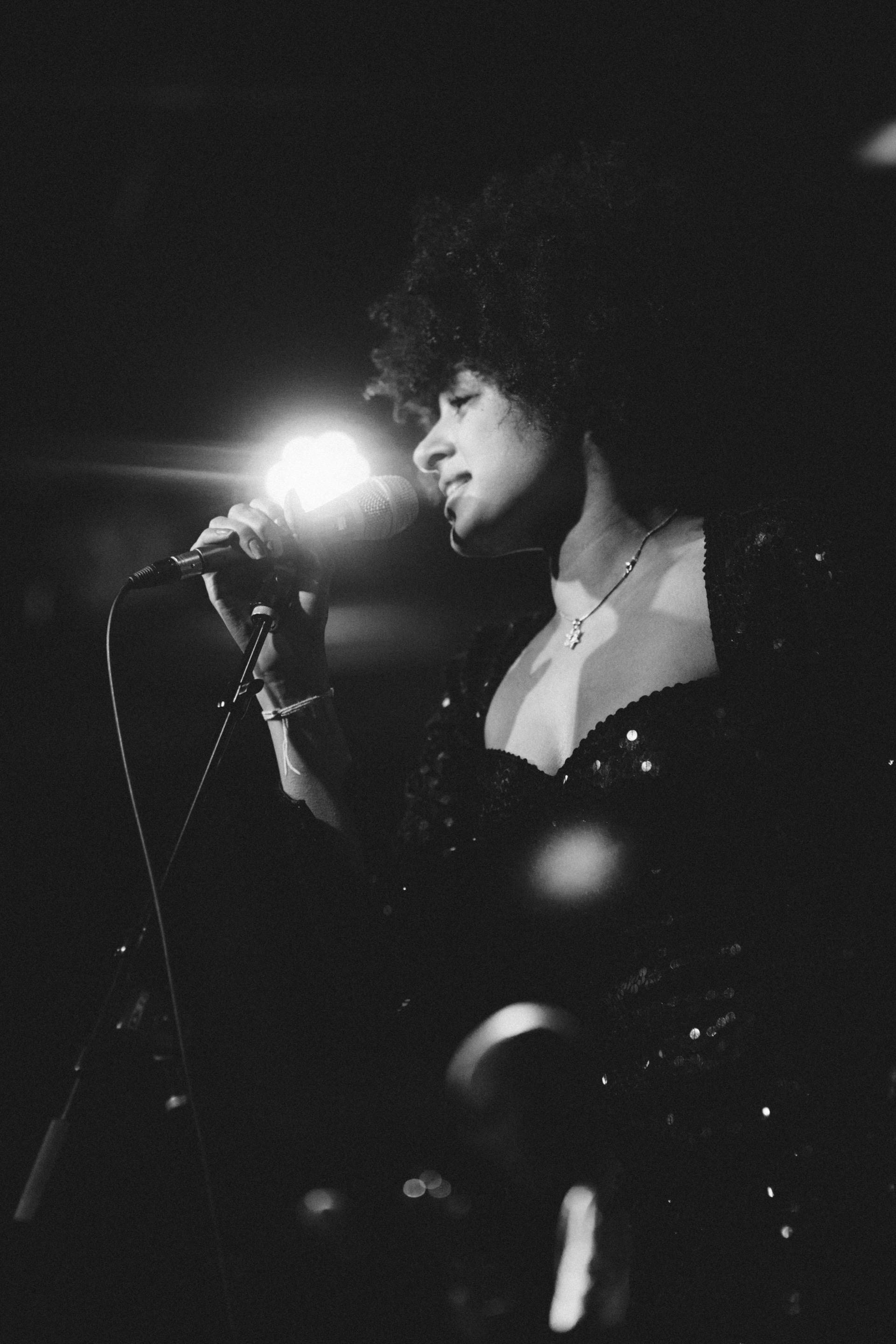

Background information
- Born: July 19, 1979 (age 45)
- Origin: Woodstock, NY, U.S.
- Genres: Rock, garage rock
- Instrument(s): Vocals, violin
- Website: Suffrajett official

Simi Sernaker, born Simantha Sernaker in 1979 and also known as Simi Stone, is an artist and the former frontwoman of the rock band Suffrajett. As Simi Stone, she is a singer, songwriter and musician. Stone was a member of The New Pornographers as vocalist/violinist, and she has provided backing vocals for Natalie Merchant and David Byrne.

== Early life ==
Simi Sernaker was born and raised in Woodstock, New York, by her New York-raised Jewish mother Dorothy Sernaker and her Jamaican-born writer father Ernest Bledsoe. Bledsoe's mother had traveled on the blues circuit playing piano in the south. Dorothy Sernaker was a teacher and a disciple of Satchidananda Saraswati.

At seven, Simi Sernaker took up the classical violin and at ten, was admitted to The New York Conservatory for the Arts in Hurley, New York, where she studied musical theatre, dance, and voice. Around that time, Sernaker began writing songs and performing them in school, and she made her own record Cloudy Day on Mountain Lodge. Upon graduating high school, she moved to New York City and pursued a degree in acting at Marymount College, while she performed in musical theater and off-Broadway plays.

As Simi Stone, Sernaker's role in the NYC Sista Grrrl collective in 1997 with Tamar-kali, organizing punk shows by and for Black women and girls, was an influence on the Afro-punk movement.

== Music career ==
=== Suffrajett ===
Sernaker formed the band Suffrajett with sideman Jason Chasko, and she was lead singer. They performed in numerous NYC venues including Bowery Ballroom, CBGBs, and Irving Plaza, and played several Summer Stage events with Joan Jett, The Roots, Erykah Badu, and others. Suffrajett released two records, Suffrajett (2003) and Black Glitter (2007) on indie labels In Music We Trust and Giant Step Records, which garnered considerable critical acclaim from magazines such as Rolling Stone and Esquire, and earned five stars from The Chicago Sun Times.

Sernaker moved to Chicago in 2004 after a decade in New York City and relocated with Suffrajett. Time Out Chicago said of Suffrajett: "This New York via Chicago band has justifiably gained a rep for Detroit style whiplash rock and roll without acting like it's a low down dirty shame…When she's not sounding like The Shangri Las Mary Weiss, she's summoning the ghost of T-Rex's Marc Bolan, who knew how to make a whisper sound like a threat."

=== Simi Stone ===
In the late 2000s, Sernaker did solo acoustic shows under the name Simi Stone. In 2009, she opened for Simone Felice's project The Duke & the King on a U.S. tour, and then she was asked to join the band for a European/UK tour. In 2010, she recorded with them as Simi Stone for one album Long Live the Duke & the King. They were featured on Jools Holland in London, Saturday with Brendan O’Conner, and Canal Plus. Allen Jones from Uncut magazine called her "The sensational Simi Stone" and called her voice "striking" and her violin "a thing of mournful beauty."

After moving back to Woodstock, Sernaker created and released a self titled album under the name Simi Stone in 2015 and a follow-up titled The Rescue with musical partner and composer/pianist/producer David Baron. Her band included drummer Zack Alford and bassists Sara Lee and Gail Ann Dorsey.

Recording as Simi Stone, she appeared on Natalie Merchant's 2014 self-titled album and 2015 record Paradise is There. David Byrne invited Simi Stone to provide backing vocals on his 2018 world tour. Byrne said, "I heard a great, expressive voice. I sought her out, which led to us working together twice: at a celebration with the Brooklyn Steppers and Marching Band at Carnegie Hall and on my American Utopia tour during 2018, all of which was very well received. She has a great stage presence and energy." She also joined Byrne on "Late Night with Stephen Colbert," in a performance of "Everybody's Coming To My House" from his American Utopia release. As Simi Stone, she has also toured, performed and recorded with Neko Case, Conor Oberst, Gipsy Kings, Amy Helm and Dan Zanes.

Beginning in 2015, she joined The New Pornographers as a touring member before becoming an official member in 2019. Sernaker left the group in 2021.

== Art ==
Sernaker has exhibited her drawings and paintings at gallery shows in the Hudson Valley. Sernaker first exhibited her visual art in 2016 at the Ardnaglass gallery in Woodstock, New York.
