= The Big Apple Rotten to the Core =

Compilation album by various artists
- Released: 1982
- Genre: Hardcore punk
- Label: S.I.N. Records
- Producer: Bob Sallese

The Big Apple Rotten to the Core is a hardcore punk compilation album that was released in 1982. It was the second release by S.I.N. Records, and distributed internationally. Produced by Bob Sallese. It was one of the first hardcore punk compilations from New York City (along with New York Thrash from the same year), and included six bands who regularly performed at A7, a Lower East Side after-hours dive bar that gave the new hardcore bands a forum.

The compilation's cover photos and PR were provided by Scott Eisner, one of the first writers to use the expression "hardcore punk" (in a review of The Mob). (Eisner later jumped off the Throgs Neck Bridge, which links Queens to The Bronx.)

The popularity of the album prompted WLIR to start a weekly broadcast called Midnight Riot, which featured the other bands on the album as well as many other local hardcore bands. It also prompted the station to put other hardcore songs into regular rotation, such as Black Flag's "TV Party."

== The bands ==
- Ism were from Queens. Their songs "John Hinckley Jr. (What Has Jodie Foster Done to You?)" and "Moon The Moonies," both of which were featured on the album, were put into regular rotation on WLIR, and were the first hardcore songs to receive commercial airplay in the New York metropolitan area. "John Hinckley Jr. (What Has Jodie Foster Done to You?)" was nominated for two weeks straight for the station's "Screamer of the Week" award. Frontman Jism ended up spending five years in a New York State prison after a somewhat controversial arrest.
- Butch Lust & The Hypocrites were from Brooklyn and Manhattan. Lenny Steel of the punk band Pure Hell appeared on the album as a member of Butch Lust & The Hypocrites. Another member, Ace in the Hole, later died in a car crash.
- The Mob, also from Queens, went on to release the 7-inch EPs Upset the System and Step Forward (1983), and the album We Come to Crush (1986). They influenced many of the later New York hardcore bands that wanted to move away from the early punk rock influences and create faster thrash sounds.
- The Headlickers, who often played at A7, were the only band that did not reside in one of New York City's five boroughs, but instead came from Nassau County.
- Killer Instinct were from Queens and Manhattan, and were composed of guitarist Jet Suicide, drummer Bobby Skull, bassist Kitty Hawk, and vocalist Carolyn Lengel. Their two songs, "Killer Instinct" and "Torture You First", were recorded at the band's rehearsal studio, Rock Bite. Killer Instinct's first gig was at A7 in January 1982, and the band broke up six months later, before The Big Apple: Rotten to the Core had even been released. They later regrouped (with Meryl "Lynch" Hurwich replacing Suicide) as XKI, whose song "I Hate Everything" appeared on the 1983 7-inch compilation EP Big City Aint Too Pretty.
- Squirm were from Brooklyn. Their song "Fuck You Brooke Shields" received some commercial airplay (with bleeps inserted throughout the song). Bassist Igor Jakuskowas, who used to room with Cheetah Chrome, was noted for shouting the traditional hardcore count-off "1,2,3,4!" in Ukrainian. Squirm had a string of opening slots for most national touring punk bands at the Brooklyn club Zappas. Jakuskowas later hanged himself.

== Aftermath ==
The album was the first New York City hardcore punk compilation made available to college and alternative radio stations nationwide. It quickly gained notoriety, but despite its success, the album seemed to be jinxed. Demand for the record's second pressing could not be met because the pressing plant would not release the masters and was bootlegging them in other parts of the country. The owner of the plant was eventually busted by the FBI for bootlegging Beatles albums.

A follow-up album, The Big Apple Rotten to the Core, Vol. 2, was released five years later by the Raw Power label, and included the returning Ism, Butch Lust, The Mob and The Headlickers alongside newer bands such as Ed Gein's Car, Bunker's Boys, Slime Puppies and The Six and Violence. Omer Travers (infamous for breaking into Yoko Ono's apartment and leaving love notes) appeared on this album with a song produced by Jism and Sallese. Travers and Jism were later invited onto The Howard Stern Show to promote the album.
