= A Band Called Death =

- Film poster for A Band Called Death featuring the group in the 1970s.
- Directed by: Mark Christopher Covino; Jeff Howlett
- Produced by: Mark Christopher Covino; Jeff Howlett; Jerry Ferrara; Kevin Mann; Matthew Perniciaro; Scott Mosier
- Starring: Bobby Hackney Sr. Dannis Hackney
- Edited by: Rich Fox
- Music by: Tim Boland
- Distributed by: Drafthouse Films
- Release date: June 16, 2012 (Los Angeles Film Festival)
- Running time: 98 minutes
- Country: United States

A Band Called Death is a 2012 American documentary film directed by Mark Christopher Covino and Jeff Howlett. The documentary is about the 1970s Detroit rock band Death and their new-found popularity decades after the group recorded their music.

The film premiered at the Los Angeles Film Festival in 2012 and was well received by film critics.

== Synopsis ==
A Band Called Death is the story of three musician brothers, born to a Baptist preacher and his wife in 1950s Detroit. In their teenage years, the three brothers (to five other siblings) emerge first as a budding rock/funk band, heavily influenced by Motown & Parliament, ultimately evolving into pioneers of punk music, Death. Influenced by Alice Cooper and The Who, the group was heavily steered by the guidance and decisions of visionary eldest brother and guitarist, David Hackney. The story follows the brothers' unsuccessful attempts to get radio airplay and a record deal, largely due to David's adamant refusal to change the name from Death. An eventual trek east finds the boys in Burlington, Vermont, living with relatives and reflecting on the failure of David's vision. The film then explores post-Death projects in The 4th Movement, a gospel/rock band with the same line-up. However, after two years of being homesick, David returns to Detroit, leaving Dannis and Bobby to form a lively reggae band called Lambsbread. The film also focuses on the intense brotherly bond between the group members and their personal lives, including David Hackney's battle with alcoholism, his death in 2000, and his family members' reactions to these events. The film follows the re-discovery of the group through record collectors leading to an eventual release of Death's album ...For the Whole World to See by the Drag City record label and the group's eventual reunion and touring with a new guitarist.

== Production ==
Director Jeff Howlett met Bobby Hackney Sr. and Dannis Hackney in the 1990s at a local music festival where his band and their band, Lambsbread, were playing. Bobby Hackney Jr. had formed his own band Rough Francis with his brothers to honor his father's band Death. After Howlett saw the show, he was impressed with the music and with Bobby Jr. and his father, and they began working on the documentary. In 2008, Mark Covino met Howlett while working on a video that Howlett was directing. The next year, Howlett approached Covino to work on the film with him, but Covino was initially hesitant about helping Howlett as he was attempting to finish his own documentary feature at the time. He changed his mind after reading an article in The New York Times on the group and hearing the two songs from the "Politicians in my Eyes" 7" single. Covino spent months organizing and scanning photos from members of the groups family from Vermont, Ohio and Detroit. Very little video footage of the group's guitarist David Hackney surfaced during their duo's research.

== Release ==
A Band Called Death had its world premiere at the 2012 Los Angeles Film Festival on June 16. It was acquired by Drafthouse Films shortly before screening at South By Southwest in 2013. The film was released on DVD and Blu-ray Disc on August 13, 2013.

== Reception ==
Initial critical response to A Band Called Death was positive. On the review aggregator website Rotten Tomatoes, 94% of 53 critics' reviews are positive, with an average rating of 7.7/10. The website's consensus reads: "A Band Called Death is not only a fascinating portrait of a pioneering rock group, but also a tribute to family ties and perseverance in the face of hardship." At Metacritic, which assigns a normalized rating out of 100 to reviews from mainstream critics, the film has received an average score of 77, based on 14 reviews.
