= Wendell & Wild =

2022 film by Henry Selick

- Promotional release poster
- Directed by: Henry Selick
- Screenplay by: Henry Selick; Jordan Peele
- Based on: Wendell & Wild (unpublished) by: Henry Selick; Clay McLeod Chapman
- Produced by: Henry Selick; Ellen Goldsmith-Vein; Jordan Peele
- Starring: Keegan-Michael Key; Jordan Peele; Angela Bassett; Lyric Ross; James Hong; Ving Rhames
- Cinematography: Peter Sorg
- Edited by: Mandy Hutchings; Jason Hooper
- Music by: Bruno Coulais
- Production companies: Netflix Animation Studios; Gotham Group; Monkeypaw Productions
- Distributed by: Netflix
- Release dates: September 11, 2022 (TIFF); October 21, 2022 (United States); October 28, 2022 (Netflix)
- Running time: 105 minutes
- Country: United States
- Language: English

Wendell & Wild is a 2022 American animated Gothic comedy horror film directed by Henry Selick from a screenplay written by Selick and Jordan Peele (who are also producers), based on Selick's and Clay McLeod Chapman's unpublished book of the same name. It stars Keegan-Michael Key and Jordan Peele as the titular characters with Angela Bassett, Lyric Ross, James Hong, and Ving Rhames in supporting roles. This was Selick's first feature film since Coraline (2009).

Selick began developing his stop-motion animation feature with Key and Peele set to star in November 2015. The distribution rights were picked up by Netflix in March 2018. Other voice cast were confirmed in March 2022. Production was done remotely during the COVID-19 pandemic, with filming taking place in Portland, Oregon.

It premiered at the 47th Toronto International Film Festival on September 11, 2022, was released in select theaters on October 21, 2022, and made its streaming release in Netflix on October 28, 2022. It received generally positive reviews from critics who welcomed Selick's return and praised its stop-motion animation and characters, but criticized its screenplay and the overloaded plot. The film is dedicated to Mark Musumeci, an electricity consultant who worked on almost all of Selick's previous stop-motion features since The Nightmare Before Christmas, who died during production.

== Plot ==
Eight-year-old Katherine "Kat" Elliot lives with her parents Delroy and Wilma, who own a root beer brewery in the town of Rust Bank. While returning home, Delroy and Wilma were killed when Delroy loses control of their car, plummeting off a bridge.

In the underworld, demon brothers Wendell and Wild spend their days installing hair plugs and rejuvenating hair cream on their balding father, Buffalo Belzer, as punishment for dreaming of building an afterlife amusement park to rival his. They taste the cream, causing them to hallucinate a vision of Kat.

Five years later, Kat has become a juvenile delinquent who blames herself for her parents' deaths. She is enrolled in Rust Bank's all-girls Catholic school, headed by Father Level Bests. Kat saves Siobhan Klaxon, whose parents Lane and Irmgard's private prison company Klax Korp back the school and took over the town, from a falling brick through premonition, earning her respect. Meanwhile, Marianna Cocolotl investigates the burning of the brewery and is convinced that the Klaxons purposely burned it with its workers. The Klaxons murder Bests, the last living witness to the brewery arson, when he protests their refusal to keep funding the school.

During a lesson by Sister Helley, Kat receives a mouth-like marking on her hand, and is told to hide it and tell no one. Wendell and Wild are alerted, and they identify Kat as their "hell maiden." They appear to her in a dream, falsely promising to revive her parents if she summons them to the living world. Kat steals a teddy bear, Bearzebub, from Helley's desk and goes to her parents' grave with Marianna's trans son Raúl, serving as her witness. However by taking the wrong way, the brothers appear in a different part of the cemetery, where Kat believes she has been stood up.

Wendell and Wild discover their father's hair cream can resurrect the dead. They test the cream on Bests. Upon revival, Bests convinces the Klaxons to pay him, and the brothers to revive the deceased members of the town council, giving the Klaxons the votes needed to demolish Rust Bank and expand their prisons, on the condition that nobody else is revived. The brothers force Kat to serve them, still lying about her parents' resurrection. After being forced to exhume the council members, whom the brothers revive, Raúl steals the cream, reviving Delroy and Wilma himself. Reunited with her parents, Kat helps Raúl escape the brothers.

After the zombie council approves the Klaxons' plans, paying Bests and the brothers, Siobhan discovers her parents' lies about their prisons' conditions. Helley and Manberg subject Kat to "soul binding", confronting her memories, severing her allegiance to the brothers, and making her acknowledge that her parents' death was not her fault. The ritual grants Kat control of her precognition, which Helley reveals are from her hell maiden powers.

Bests, Wendell and Wild kidnap Kat's ressurected parents, and take them to the cemetery to kill them, though Kat's group intervenes. Siobhan, who followed her pygmy goat Gabby Goat to the cemetery, reveals that her parents paid Bests and the brothers worthless company money. Belzer discovers the brothers' deception, but seeing a mural Raúl painted across the roofs of Rust Bank's houses inspires him to be a better father. Learning they are Belzer's children, Manberg releases his collection of jarred demons in exchange for the release of Kat's group. Belzer apologizes to Wendell and Wild, approving their plans for their Dream Fair. Bests dies again, and Belzer confirms that the cream's effects are temporary.

Delroy and Wilma tell a worried Kat that her powers can help change Rust Bank. Recalling that Raúl's mother needed a witness to prove the Klaxons guilty, Kat has him use the last bits of cream to revive as many deceased brewery workers as possible. The allies fend off the zombie council's bulldozers sent to demolish the town, while Raúl revives three brewery workers to testify to the Klaxons' crimes, resulting in their arrest. Belzer's cream's effects wear off on Kat's parents, but before they die, Kat shows them a glimpse of the future where Rust Bank is revived. Wendell and Wild offer them VIP passes to their afterlife fair. Kat makes peace with her life, considering everyone her friends, even Wendell and Wild themselves.

== Voice cast ==
- Keegan-Michael Key as Wendell
- Jordan Peele as Wild
- Lyric Ross as Katherine "Kat" Koniqua Elliot
  - Serelle Strickland as Young Kat
- Angela Bassett as Sister Helley
- James Hong as Father Level Bests
- Ving Rhames as Buffalo Belzer
- Sam Zelaya as Raúl Cocolotl
- Tamara Smart as Siobhan Klaxon
- Gary Gatewood as Delroy Elliot
- Gabrielle Dennis as Wilma Elliot
- Maxine Peake as Irmgard Klaxon
- David Harewood as Lane Klaxon
- Igal Naor as Manberg
- Seema Virdi as Sloane
- Ramona Young as Sweetie
- Natalie Martinez as Marianna Cocolotl
- Tantoo Cardinal as Ms. Hunter
- Michele Mariana as Sister Daley / Sister Chinstrap
- Phoebe Lamont as Bearzebub
- Nick E. Tarabay as Fawzi
- Joe Tran as Dr. Ngo
- Caroline Crawford as Cassandra & Sukie Jordan

== Production ==
=== Development ===
Official film logo

On November 3, 2015, it was reported that Henry Selick was developing Wendell & Wild, a new stop-motion feature with Keegan-Michael Key and Jordan Peele, based on an original story by Selick. On March 14, 2018, the film was picked up by Netflix. In a July 2019 interview, Key described the voice acting process, where "Jordan and I came in and did a session against static at recording booths, sitting looking across at Jordan and it's lots of ideas flowing, cutting each other off to keep that organic feeling. That usually ends up on the cutting room floor as you find the voices and you want a little refinement–some rhythm. We spent a good deal of time with an initial scene that Henry wrote discovering the characters and the framework of the scene. And then he uses that as inspiration to keep writing". Pablo Lobato served as lead designer on the stop-motion puppets. On March 14, 2022, the cast was revealed by Netflix on YouTube.

=== Animation ===
As of June 15, 2020, production was being done remotely during the COVID-19 pandemic. Lead writer and voice actor Peele stated that he "had an absolute blast working with Henry Selick and the crew for Wendell & Wild. I cannot wait for you to discover this film". In an October 8, 2020 interview with The Hollywood Reporter, the film's producer, Gotham Group CEO Ellen Goldsmith-Vein, elaborated on the project: "We're mid-production in Portland, Oregon, where the crew has suffered through fires, most recently, COVID and a lot of political and social unrest. It's been a very challenging movie." Editing was done by Robert Anich, and Peter Sorg was cinematographer. By February 2021, production was ongoing in Portland.

After Coraline, Selick felt stop-motion animation had become so smooth it had become indistinguishable from computer animation, defeating some of the purpose of stop-motion. He decided to allow flaws, such as keeping the seam lines on replacement faces visible, and shooting fewer frames per second in some scenes. Except for a stop-motion software called Dragonframe, he used more or less the same types of tools and techniques he used in Coraline more than a decade earlier.

Part of the film was done as cutout animation to make the puppets look more two-dimensional. They were made of tin coated with silicone. Inspired by the shadow-puppet animation in Harry Potter and the Deathly Hallows – Part 1, and an idea originally intended for Selick's yet-to-be-made stop-motion film The Shadow King, some of Wendell & Wild was done as silhouette animation, utilizing a combination of physical cutouts and CGI, with CGI used when cutouts were too limiting.

=== Music ===
On June 4, 2020, Bruno Coulais was confirmed as the composer. Its soundtrack has been noted for its emphasis on Afro-punk bands, and includes the songs "Ma and Pa" by Fishbone; "Germfree Adolescents" and "I Am a Poseur" by X-Ray Spex; "Ghost Town" by the Specials; "River" by Ibeyi; "The Wolf" by the Brat; "You Sexy Thing" by Hot Chocolate; "Young, Gifted, Black, in Leather" by Special Interest; "Freakin' Out" by Death; "Fall Asleep" by Big Joanie; "Cult of Personality" by Living Colour; "Wolf Like Me" by TV on the Radio; "Boot" by Tamar-kali; and "Raising the Dead" and "Scream Faire" by Coulais.

Speaking about the film's soundtrack, Selick stated:

Before Afro-punk, there was Fishbone. There was actually several black punk bands. Fishbone was punk, ska, funk. But I ended up meeting those guys, who are still performing, and we have one of their songs in the film. They're still performing now, but I met them in the 1980s. And I wrote and directed a music video of one of their songs called "Party at Ground Zero"... And then there's all these other pioneers of the time that, some are forgotten, some are remembered, especially with the Afro-punk movement, they're remembered. But there was bands, you know, Death, Pure Hell. The Brat, which was a Chicano band, actually, in L.A. Poly Styrene of X-Ray Spex. Bad Brains. Fishbone.

Producer Win Rosenfeld suggested the use of Fishbone's "Ma and Pa" as a means of "building that bridge, sonically" between the characters of Kat and her parents.

== Release ==
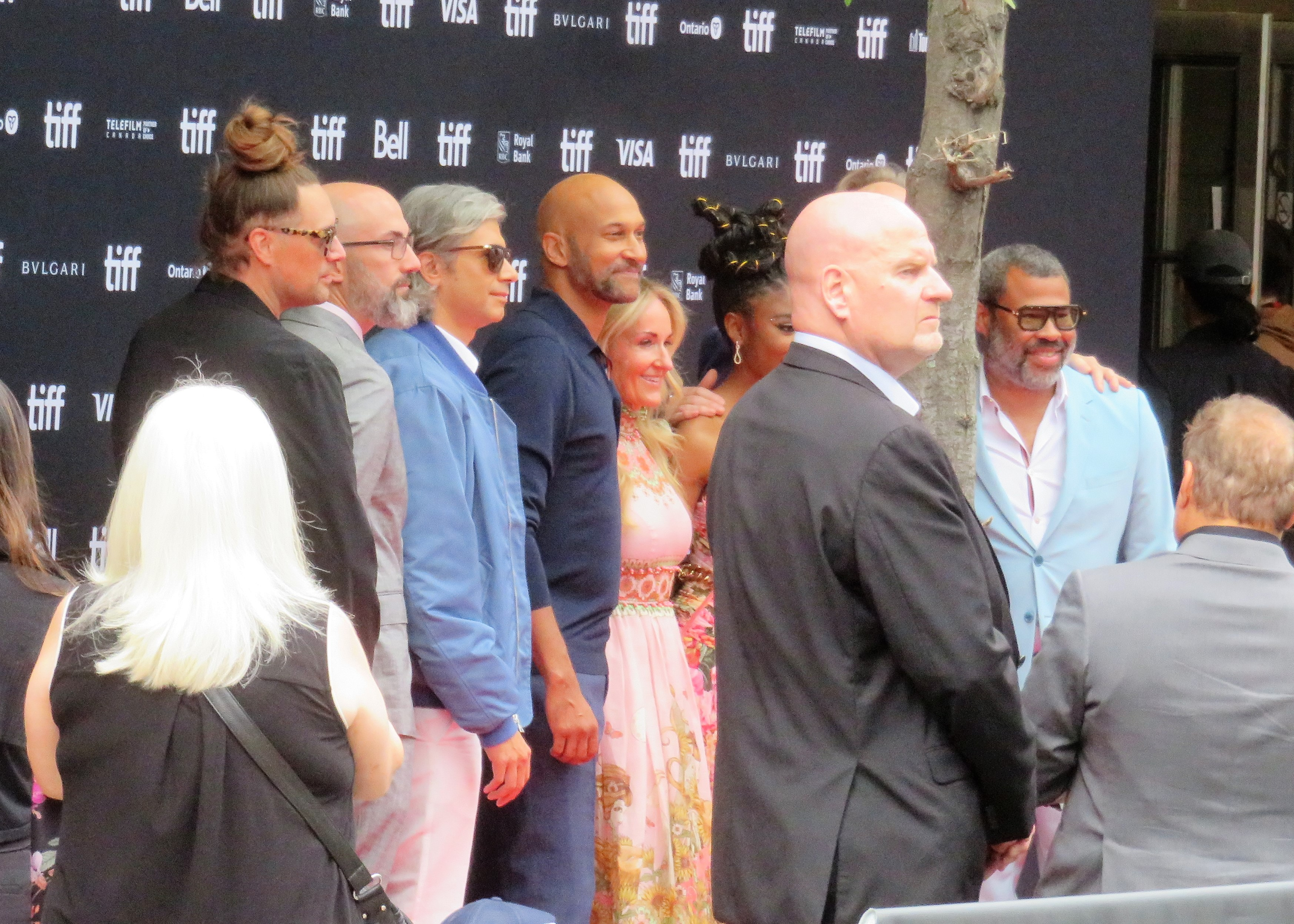
The cast and crew at the Toronto Film Festival in 2022

Wendell & Wild premiered at the Toronto International Film Festival on September 11, 2022 and was released in select theaters on October 21, 2022, before its release on Netflix on October 28, 2022.

On November 6, 2018, Netflix announced that it would be available for streaming in 2021. On July 18, 2019, Key announced the film was planned to be released in late 2020. On January 14, 2021, Netflix CEO Ted Sarandos revealed that the release would be moved to "2022 or later" to meet Netflix's criteria of releasing six animated features per year. Simon & Schuster would adapt the screenplay to novel form, to tie into the film's release.

== Reception ==
=== Critical reception ===
On the review aggregator website Rotten Tomatoes, 80% of 122 critics' reviews are positive, with an average rating of 6.9/10. The website's consensus reads: "Boasting visual marvels to match its ambitious and inclusive story, Wendell & Wild is a spooky treat for budding horror fans." Metacritic, which uses a weighted average, assigned the film a score of 69 out of 100, based on 31 critics, indicating "generally favorable" reviews.

Chase Hutchinson of Collider, gave a positive review, saying, "when it all comes together, Wendell & Wild ends up feeling liberating, both artistically and thematically, with top work from all involved." Sarah Bea Milner, of /Film, also gave a positive review, writing, "move over The Nightmare Before Christmas — there's a new stop-motion horror flick in town." Michael Rechtshaffen, of The Hollywood Reporter, further praised the film for being "a fresh, highly original concoction of playful Grand Guignol proportions." Radheyan Simonpillai, of The Guardian, wrote "the more characters Selick has to work with, the more room there is for his deliciously strange and comic visual craft." In a positive review, for RogerEbert.com, Brian Tallerico wrote "there's no denying that this is a world that animation fans will just want to explore, to live in, to savor. It's been too long since we got a window into Henry Selick's brain and it's still an amazing view."

Meagan Navarro, of Bloody Disgusting, gave a lukewarm review, writing, "it's an entertaining, if a bit overstuffed, romp through hell and back, with memorable characters and amusingly macabre hijinks." Esther Zuckerman, writing for Vanity Fair, said the film "is slightly too convoluted with some world-building short-changed, but it twists and turns to a place of genuine emotion and a rousing call to take down the ghouls of the real world rather than the demons of the underworld." The Playlist's Jason Bailey praised the characters and stop-motion animation, assigning the film a grade of "B-" but ultimately concluding: "If it were a might tighter (it runs a rather flabby 105 minutes), or more rapidly paced, they might've really had something here; the highs are high, but Selick struggles to keep its narrative momentum going".

=== Accolades ===
Award	Date of ceremony	Category	Recipient(s)	Result	Ref.
Hollywood Music in Media Awards	November 16, 2022	Best Original Score in a Fantasy Film	Bruno Coulais	Nominated	
Washington D.C. Area Film Critics Association	December 12, 2022	Best Animated Feature	Wendell & Wild	Nominated	
St. Louis Gateway Film Critics Association	December 18, 2022	Best Animated Film	Wendell & Wild	Nominated	
Alliance of Women Film Journalists	January 5, 2023	Best Animated Film	Wendell & Wild	Nominated	
Alliance of Women Film Journalists	January 5, 2023	Best Animated Female	"Kat" (Lyric Ross)	Nominated	
San Diego Film Critics Society	January 6, 2023	Best Animated Film	Wendell & Wild	Nominated	
Critics' Choice Movie Awards	January 15, 2023	Best Animated Feature	Wendell & Wild	Nominated	
Visual Effects Society Awards	February 15, 2023	Outstanding Created Environment in an Animated Feature	Tom Proost, Nicholas Blake, Colin Babcock, Matthew Paul Albertus Cross (The Scream Fair)	Nominated	
Visual Effects Society Awards	February 15, 2023	Outstanding Model in a Photoreal or Animated Project	Peter Dahmen, Paul Harrod, Nicholas Blake (Dream Fair)	Nominated	
Annie Awards	February 25, 2023	Best Animated Feature	Wendell & Wild	Nominated	
Annie Awards	February 25, 2023	Outstanding Achievement for Character Design in an Animated Feature Production	Pablo Lobato	Nominated	
Annie Awards	February 25, 2023	Outstanding Achievement for Directing in an Animated Feature Production	Henry Selick	Nominated	
African American Film Critics Association	March 1, 2023	Best Animated Feature	Wendell & Wild	Won	
