= ...For the Whole World to See =

Studio album by Death
- Released: February 17, 2009
- Recorded: 1975
- Studios: United Sound; Detroit, Michigan
- Genres: Punk rock; hard rock; garage rock; proto-punk
- Length: 26:23
- Label: Drag City
- Producer: Death

Death chronology
| ...For the Whole World to See (2009) | Spiritual • Mental • Physical (2011) |

...For the Whole World to See is a studio album by the Detroit musical group Death, released in 2009 and consisting of songs originally recorded in 1975.

== Background and recording ==
In 1975, Death recorded an album, but its release was prevented and the band were dropped by Clive Davis of Columbia Records who took offense to the band's name and their lyrics. Only seven songs were completed, and the album was left unreleased, but they independently released a 1976 7-inch single that featured "Politicians in My Eyes" on the A-side and "Keep On Knockin'" on the B-side. The surviving songs were eventually released as ...For the Whole World to See in 2009 by Drag City.

Just prior to and right after the record's release, the songs on ...For the Whole World to See were performed live by Rough Francis, a band formed by the three sons of Death's original bassist. With the record's critical acclaim and praise from many other musicians, the two surviving members of Death reformed the band with a new guitarist to promote the record themselves.

== Reception and legacy ==
Professional ratings
Aggregate scores
| Source | Rating |
|---|---|
| Metacritic | 76/100 |
Review scores
| Source | Rating |
| AllMusic | 4.5/5 stars |
| Pitchfork Media | (7.1/10) |
| Sputnikmusic | 4/5 stars |
| Tiny Mix Tapes | 4/5 stars |

Initial critical response to ...For the Whole World to See was positive. At Metacritic, which assigns a normalized rating out of 100 to reviews from mainstream critics, the album has received an average score of 76, based on 8 reviews.

Jack White of The White Stripes related his first reaction to the album in a New York Times article: "I couldn't believe what I was hearing. When I was told the history of the band and what year they recorded this music, it just didn't make sense. Ahead of punk, and ahead of their time."

In 2024, Greg Prato of Ultimate Guitar wrote that with the album, the band had retrospectively shown that it "was one of the first to begin to dial up punk's intensity."

=== In media ===
The song "You're a Prisoner" was featured in the 2011 film Kill the Irishman.

The song "Freakin Out" is played in the main action sequence on the sixth episode of the Starz show Ash vs. Evil Dead.

The song "Keep on Knocking" was used for the soundtrack for the video game Tony Hawk's Pro Skater 5. It was also featured briefly in the movie The Dirt when young Nikki Sixx is trashing his bedroom.

The song "Politicians in My Eyes" was covered by the band Black Pumas in the deluxe release of their debut album (2019).

The song "Freakin Out" was featured in the 2022 film Wendell & Wild.

== Track listing ==
Side A
| No. | Title | Music | Length |
|---|---|---|---|
| 1. | "Keep on Knocking" | David Hackney, Bobby Hackney | 2:50 |
| 2. | "Rock-N-Roll Victim" | D. Hackney | 2:41 |
| 3. | "Let the World Turn" | D. Hackney, B. Hackney | 5:56 |
| 4. | "You're a Prisoner" | D. Hackney, B. Hackney | 2:24 |
| Total length: | | | 13:52 |

Side B
| No. | Title | Music | Length |
|---|---|---|---|
| 5. | "Freakin Out" | B. Hackney | 2:48 |
| 6. | "Where Do We Go from Here???" | B. Hackney | 3:50 |
| 7. | "Politicians in My Eyes" | B. Hackney | 5:50 |
| Total length: | | | 12:29 |

== Personnel ==
Death

- David Hackney – guitar
- Bobby Hackney – bass, lead vocals
- Dannis Hackney – drums

Technical

- Death – producer
- Tammy Hackney – photography
- Jim Vitti – engineer
