= Afro-punk =

Punk rock genre

- Stylistic origins: Punk rock; ska; alternative rock
- Cultural origins: United States in the 21st century

Afro-punk (sometimes spelled Afro Punk, Afropunk or AfroPunk) refers to the participation of black people in punk music and the punk subculture. Black people's participation in punk music has existed since the genre's origins in 1969 with the ska movement of Boss Skinhead Laurel Aitken and his song "Skinhead Train" from 1969. Afro-punk has persisted to the present day, and it has played a key role in punk scenes throughout the world, especially in the United States and the United Kingdom. Notable bands that can be linked to the afro-punk community and/or bands that include afro-punk members are but not limited to: Death, Pure Hell, Bad Brains, Suicidal Tendencies, Dead Kennedys, Fishbone, Wesley Willis Fiasco, Suffrajett, The Templars, Unlocking the Truth, MAAFA, Rebelmatic, Winterwolf, and Rough Francis.

== History ==
The term originated from the 2003 documentary Afro-Punk directed by James Spooner. But, Afro-punk music has been around since the mid-70s with Pure Hell. Pure Hell was the first all-black punk band that originated in Philadelphia, PA. In addition, black people have been intertwined in the punk scene since its birth in the 1970s, with black-led bands such as X Ray Spex having connections and associations with key figures in the scene such as Johnny Rotten. During the late 90s, a series of feminist black punk concerts, under the moniker "Sista Grrrl Riots", were performed in response to the lack of intersectionality found in the punk Riot Grrrl subculture.

In the early 21st century, Afro-punks made up a minority in the North American punk scene. Notable bands that can be linked to the Afro-punk community include: Death, Pure Hell, Bad Brains, Suicidal Tendencies, Dead Kennedys, Fishbone, Wesley Willis Fiasco, Suffrajett, The Templars, Unlocking the Truth, Rough Francis, MAAFA, Rebelmatic, WinterWolf, Meet Me at the Altar and The Paradox. In the United Kingdom, influential black musicians associated with the late 1970s punk scene included Poly Styrene of X-Ray Spex, Don Letts, and Basement 5. Afro-punk has become a movement, comparable to the early hip-hop movement of the 1980s. The Afropunk Music Festival was founded in 2005 by James Spooner and Matthew Morgan.

== Festivals ==
AfroPunk has Festivals in five locations. The 2019 Brooklyn AfroPunk Festival took place on August 24 and 25. The Atlanta AfroPunk will take place October 12 and 13. There will also be festivals in London, Paris, and Johannesburg. The line-up for the festivals vary depending on location, but include artists Jill Scott, Anderson.Paak, FKA Twigs, Leon Bridges, Danny Brown, Smino, Tierra Whack, Ho99o9, Earth Gang, Kamasi Washington, Santigold, Fever 333, Leikeli47, Mahalia, and many more.

The recent 2023 lineup featured Joey Bada$$, Baby Tate, Sudan Archives, Enny, and more.

AfroPunk's 2024 festival, titled "AfroPunk: BLKTOPIA" occurred from August 22-August 24 at Prospect Park in Brooklyn, New York.The festival hosted by Amari Marshall and headlined by Eryka Badu featured performances by artists including Phunky Nomad, Winter Wolf, Breezy Supreme, Hue, Rebelmatic, Jenny Haes Techno, DJ Moma, Larissa Luz, and Derand Bernarr. The event also included a ball hosted by House of Juicy Couture.

=== Controversies ===
On September 4, 2018 Lou Constant-Desportes resigned from his position as Editor-in-Chief of the festival's official website, Afropunk.com, citing higher-ups' dilution of the festival's radical beliefs as a major factor in his resignation. Constant-Desportes also accused the organization of "gaslighting, victim-blaming, and exploitation" as stated in an interview with the online publication Vibe.

One month prior, in August of the same year (2018) Ebony Donnley, alongside another individual were removed from the premises of the AfroPunk festival in Brooklyn, New York by the festival's co-founder Matthew Morgan. The pair were allegedly removed as a result of the text written on Donnley's t-shirt, reading "AfroPunk sold out for white consumption".

=== Gentrification of Afro-punk ===
The idea that "Afropunk sold out for white consumption" is not a recent concept. On August 15, 2015, in an article titled "Gentrifying Afropunk" Hannah Giorgis also criticizes the current direction that Afropunk is headed towards, a broader appeal to audiences through the mixing of other genres like soul, instead of focusing strictly on punk music. This has caused a split in the afro-punk community, as some wish for Afro-punk to evolve with the times and cater to a growing audience, while others want afro-punk to remain untainted or separate from other genres of music. "While this move toward attracting wider audiences has worked, it's also shifted the focus away from the movement's origins-and pushed out punk fans in the process"
