= Afro-Punk (film) =

2003 film directed by James Spooner

- Directed by: James Spooner
- Produced by: Ayanna Mackins; James Spooner
- Starring: Matt Davis; Mariko Jones; Moe Mitchell; Tamar-kali Brown
- Distributed by: James Spooner
- Release date: 2003
- Running time: 66 minutes
- Language: English

Afro-Punk (2003) is a 66-minute documentary film directed by James Spooner, exploring the roles of African Americans within what was then an overwhelmingly white punk scene across the United States—and taking place as the world shifted with the galvanizing power of the internet. The film focuses on the lives of four African American youths dedicated to the underground music and punk rock lifestyle, interspersed with interviews from scores of black punk rockers from all over the United States. Fans of the film and the music inspired an alternative movement, that was later interpreted for the annual Afropunk Festival beginning in 2005.

== Summary ==
Afro-Punk explores the lives of black youth within a predominantly white punk subculture with the aim of expanding notions of blackness and reclaiming rock's roots by providing a platform for black artists that were not given the opportunity elsewhere. Partially growing up biracial on the streets of New York City, Spooner discovered and connected with the punk music scene and its culture but also felt alienated from both his white peers in the scene and the black community outside the scene. After examining the world of hardcore punk in America at the time, noticing the lack of people of color, along with the absence of dialogue around race despite its activist leanings, he began to question what it means to be black within alternative scenes. Digging deeper into the subject of race became the inspiration for his documentary. Traveling throughout the United States and abroad, Spooner followed the lives of four African Americans who submerged and dedicated their lives to the punk rock scene and its values. Through exclusive interviews with punks and various punk rock bands including Fishbone, 24-7 Spyz, and Dead Kennedys, Spooner's documentary covered issues of loneliness, exile, inter-racial dating, and the double lives people of color lead within a predominantly white sub-cultured community.

Spooner toured the film throughout the United States and the world, screening it over 300 times, garnering followers, and building community. He then created a message board to connect alternative black people from around the world. Soon after he held shows to foster that community. Shows included Bad Brains Tributes, The Double Consciousness Rock series at CBGBs, a west coast tour and screening with Ricky Fitts, and others.

Afro-Punk features performances by Bad Brains, Tamar-kali, Cipher, and Ten Grand. It also contains exclusive interviews by members of Fishbone, 24-7 Spyz, Dead Kennedys, Candiria, Orange 9mm, The Veldt, and TV on the Radio, among others. (Matt Davis, guitarist and vocalist of Ten Grand, died on August 10, 2003, shortly after the film was released.)

== Festivals and recognition ==
In 2003, the documentary was featured at the American Black Film Festival, the Pan African Film & Arts Festival, Festival International de Cine de Mar del Plata, and The Milan International Film Festival. It won an Official Selection at the Toronto International Film Festival, an Audience Award at the Black Harvest International Film and Video Festival in Chicago, an award for Excellence in Documentary Filmmaking at the Roxbury Film Festival in Boston, and an award for Best Documentary at the International Jamerican Film and Music Festival in Jamaica.

== Developments since the film ==
In 2005, James Spooner and Matthew Morgan co-founded the annual Afropunk Festival held in Brooklyn, New York after a series of prior music gatherings entitled "The Liberation Sessions" and inspired by the black punk community active on their message boards. Spooner's last year with the festival was in 2008 due to philosophical differences with its direction.

== See also ==
- James Spooner
- Afro-Punk
- Black Rock Coalition
