= Dylan Giambatista =

American politician and member of the Vermont State House of Representatives

Member of the Vermont House of Representatives from the Chittenden 8-2 district
- In office 2017–2021
- Succeeded by: Karen Dolan

Personal details
- Born: Rutland, Vermont, U.S.
- Party: Democratic
- Education: Johnson State College (BA)

Dylan Giambatista is an American politician and musician who served in the Vermont House of Representatives from 2017 to 2021.

== Early life and education ==
Giambatista was born in Rutland, Vermont, and was educated in public schools before leaving high school at age 16. A self-taught musician, throughout his childhood, he was a drummer and guitarist for several rock bands, and was a founding member of the Burlington-based band Rough Francis. Giambatista completed his B.A. at Johnson State College and was later awarded the college's Rising Star Alumni Award in 2016.

== Career ==
Giambatista became interested in politics while touring in bands and eventually decided to continue his education at the Community College of Vermont. He later attended Johnson State College, where he met then-State Senator Bill Doyle.

Giambatista worked on statewide political campaigns before serving as an aide to Treasurer Beth Pearce. In 2014 he became chief of staff to Shap Smith, who was then serving as speaker of the Vermont House of Representatives. Upon completion of the 2015–2016 legislative biennium in May 2016, Giambatista launched a successful campaign for State Representative in the Chittenden 8-2 House District. After being sworn in, Giambatista was assigned to the House Education Committee. In 2018, he was elected by a Joint Assembly of the Vermont General Assembly to serve a 4-year term on the Vermont State Colleges System Board of Trustees.

Giambatista was re-elected in 2018. He was elected assistant majority leader of the House Democratic Caucus and served in that capacity until his term concluded in January 2021.

Giambatista was an unsuccessful candidate for Vermont State Senate in 2020.
