= Come to Me (Marv Johnson song) =

Single by Marv Johnson

from the album Marvelous Marv Johnson
- B-side: "Whisper"
- Released: May 1959
- Recorded: 1958, United Sound Systems, Detroit
- Genre: Doo-wop, rhythm and blues
- Length: 2:23
- Label: Tamla; T 101; United Artists (re-issue); UA 160
- Songwriters: Marv Johnson; Berry Gordy
- Producer: Berry Gordy

Marv Johnson singles chronology
"Come to Me" (1959)	"I'm Coming Home" (1959)

"Come to Me" is the debut single by American singer Marv Johnson. This tune was the first single to be released on the newly formed Tamla Records label, which eventually became a subdivision of the famed Motown label. It also became Johnson's first hit single after the song was nationally distributed by United Artists. It was recorded at United Sound Systems.

== Background ==
In 1958, Marv Johnson was singing with a local group the Serenaders in Detroit. It was while performing at a carnival in Michigan that Johnson was noted by rising record label impresario Berry Gordy, who was looking to sign acts into his fledgling company. Originally the label was to be called Tammy Records, which he named after the Debbie Reynolds hit, "Tammy", that is until a record label of the same name took notice, forcing Gordy to alter the name to Tamla Records. After discovering Johnson, he convinced him to sign with Tamla and in February 1959, the 20-year-old Johnson co-wrote and recorded the song, "Come to Me". Gordy assembled several musicians, including bassist James Jamerson and drummer Benny Benjamin, and background vocalists the Rayber Voices, to contribute to the song with Johnson.

== Charts ==
"Come to Me" was first distributed by Tamla in May 1959 and was a local hit in the Midwest. Since Tamla was still a local company and was unable to get national distribution to the record, Gordy sold rights of the song to United Artists who agreed to distribute the song nationally. The plan worked as the song began to be a national hit at the end of 1959. By early 1960, the song had reached number 30 on the Billboard Hot 100 and number 6 on the national R&B chart. Johnson would record in Motown's studios while recording for United Artists. Johnson returned to Motown in the late 1960s after his success peaked in the mid-1960s.

In 1990, Johnson re-recorded the song for an album he recorded for Motorcity Records.

== Credits ==
- Lead vocals by Marv Johnson
- Background vocals by The Rayber Voices (Raynoma Liles Gordy, Brian Holland, Sonny Sanders, and Robert Bateman)
- Written by Berry Gordy and Marv Johnson
- Produced and arranged by Berry Gordy
