= Rough Francis =

Rock band from Burlington, Vermont

- Origin: Burlington, Vermont, U.S.
- Genres: Punk rock; garage rock
- Years active: 2008–present
- Label: Riot House Records
- Spinoff of: Death
- Members: Bobby Hackney Jr. Julian Hackney; Urian Hackney; Tyler Bolles
- Past members: Dylan Giambatista; Paul Comegno; Steve Hazen Williams; Dan Davine

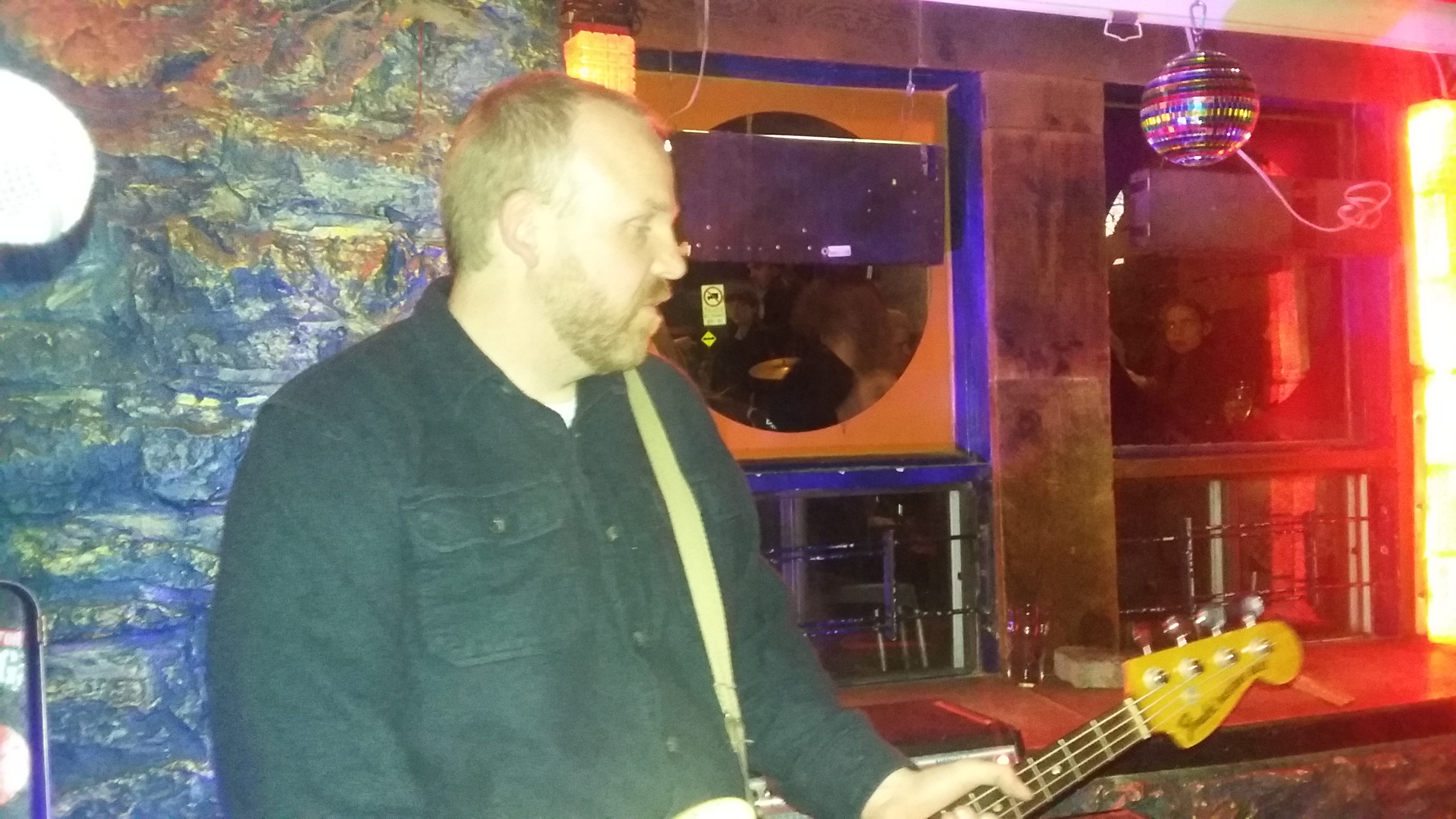
Rough Francis in Montreal, in 2015

Rough Francis is a rock band from Burlington, Vermont, consisting of Bobby, Julian, and Urian Hackney, along with Tyler Bolles. The Hackney brothers originally formed the group in 2008 to pay tribute to the music of their father's (and uncles') early 1970s proto-punk band Death.

== History ==
In 1973, three brothers, David, Bobby, and Dannis Hackney, formed the what many consider the first punk rock band, Death. The trio recorded several demos in a spare bedroom and in a studio in their home city of Detroit, Michigan. Inspired by the Beatles, The Who, and Alice Cooper, their music did not find a warm response in Detroit's Black community, and the band's foreboding name prevented them from garnering much airplay or landing a record deal. In 1976, they pressed 500 copies of a single on their own Tryangle record label to give to friends and radio DJs. Many copies of the record remained undistributed.

The Hackney brothers moved to Burlington, Vermont in the late-1970s and changed their band's name to The 4th Movement, turning to Christian Rock. They released two albums under that name in the early 1980s, which were not successful. Disheartened by his band's lack of success, guitarist and band leader David Hackney returned to Detroit while Bobby and Dannis stayed in Vermont to continue playing music together, eventually finding success in the reggae band Lambsbread. David continued to make music on his own under the pseudonym Rough Francis, and with the help of his brothers, released one single before dying in 2000.

=== As Rough Francis ===
Bassist and vocalist Bobby Hackney's three sons all became interested in punk rock without knowing anything about the rock group that their father had formed with their two uncles in the early 1970s. In 2006 the three younger Hackneys briefly formed a band to cover songs by seminal afropunks the Bad Brains. Meanwhile, Death's 1976 single began to resurface, falling into the hands of ex-Dead Kennedys singer Jello Biafra and many other record collectors who played it at parties and posted it on the Internet. These tracks eventually reached the younger Hackneys, who instantly recognized their father's voice. Excited to discover this music, the younger Hackneys learned the songs and formed a band to cover their father's and uncles' music. They named themselves Rough Francis in tribute to their late uncle David, who was largely responsible for Death's direction.

Rough Francis's first show was in Winooski, Vermont in 2008. Having enlisted two friends to fill out the band, they played seven of Death's songs for an enthusiastic crowd that included their own father and mother. The following year, Death's original 1975 recordings of these songs were released as ...For the Whole World to See by Drag City, and Rough Francis supported the release by touring and continuing to play the songs live along with some original material. When an article in The New York Times moved Death from obscurity into the limelight, Bobby Sr. and Dannis Hackney reformed Death with Lambsbread guitarist Bobbie Duncan, and Rough Francis moved on to write, perform, and record more original music. They released a four-song EP in March 2010, followed by their debut album, Maximum Soul Power in March 2013. The final track on the album, "Comm to Space," features recordings of their late uncle, David Hackney, making prank phone calls in the early 1970s using homemade analog delay effects.

The experience of the three younger Hackneys, in discovering their family's music and forming Rough Francis, is documented in the 2012 film A Band Called Death. In 2020, their song "Deathwire" was featured in the soundtrack for Tony Hawk's Pro Skater 1 + 2.

Drummer Urian Hackney has played drums for numerous hardcore bands including Trash Talk and Converge. He is also the drummer of The Armed and since 2023 Iggy Pop. In January 2021, the band announced that bassist Dan Davine had been fired after it was discovered that he attended the January 6 United States Capitol attack. The band announced that any support of white supremacism would not be tolerated.

== Band members ==
- Bobby Hackney Jr. – lead vocals, percussion
- Julian Hackney – guitar
- Urian Hackney – drums
- Tyler Bolles – bass

=== Former members ===
- Dylan Giambatista – guitar
- Steve Hazen Williams – bass
- Paul Comegno – guitar
- Dan Davine - bass

== Discography ==
- Introducing Rough Francis four-song EP (2010)
- Maximum Soul Power eight-song LP/cassette/CD/digital download (2014) Riot House Records
- MSP3: Counter Attack eight-song LP (2018) Maximum Soul Pressings
- Urgent Care 8-song LP (2020) produced by Kurt Ballou
