= Spiritual Mental Physical =

Spiritual • Mental • Physical

Compilation album by Death
- Released: 2011
- Recorded: 1974–1976
- Genre: Punk rock; proto-punk; Detroit rock; hard rock; garage rock
- Length: 28:20
- Label: Drag City

Death chronology
...For the Whole World to See (2009)	Spiritual • Mental • Physical (2011)

Spiritual • Mental • Physical is a retrospective album by the Detroit proto-punk band Death consisting mainly of demo tracks recorded in their home rehearsal space between 1974–1976. Many of the songs on the set display a raw and spontaneous character, which anticipates the punk rock movement that was just around the corner in New York and London. Death's ranks consisted of brothers David, Bobby, and Dannis Hackney, who were African American, and came at the tail end of the Detroit rock movement which had produced powerhouses such as MC5 and the Stooges. In addition to the group's home demos, they also went to Detroit's United Sound Studios to record seven tracks, which now appear on the album, ...For the Whole World to See, however, it is the band's demos that are spotlighted on this outing.

The set begins in characteristically energetic fashion with "Views", whose lyrics, according to the album's liner notes, are about a rock & roll star's relationship with his management and fans. The next cut, "Masks" echoes the melody of the Beatles' "Got to Get You Into My Life", but on the "punkiest" terms, as the song breaks out into fast thrashes following each verse. "Changes", which features the late Dave Hackney on guitar, is the only cut on the album recorded during their professional sessions at United Studios, and it marks a marked change of mood to the more meditative and contemplative side of the group, as Hackney experiments with tape loops and sound effects. "World of Tomorrow", a medium-tempo piece, breaks out into climaxes after each verse, and on the next cut "Can You Give Me A Thrill???", the band switches back into "full throttle" rocking form. The song eventually leads up to a mock ending, but then goes into an encore before its finale. The three chords to "People Look Away" echo "Do Ya", by the Move, which later became a hit for the Electric Light Orchestra. The last several cuts are mainly instrumental jams, such as the dissonant "The Storm Within". "David's Dream (flying)" reprises David Hackney's early cut "Changes". "Bobby Bassing It" features Bobby Hackney on bass and the closing cut "Dannis on the Motor City Drums" is a snapshot of Dannis Hackney practicing on drums.

== Track listing ==
1. "Views" 3:02
2. "The Masks" 3:11 (Bobby Hackney)
3. "The Change" 3:45
4. "World of Tomorrow" 1:41
5. "Can You Give Me a Thrill???" 5:43
6. "People Look Away" 2:14
7. "The Storm Within" 3:01
8. "David's Dream (Flying)" 2:01
9. "Bobby Bassing It" 1:28
10. "Dannis on the Motor City Drums" 2:14

== Catalogue and release information ==
- ''Spiritual • Mental • Physical'' (Drag City DC447CD, 2011)
