= Dreamer Isioma =

Nigerian-American musician

- Born: 2000 or 2001 (age 24–25)
- Genres: Various
- Occupation: Singer-songwriter
- Labels: AWAL
- Website: dreamerisioma.com

Dreamer Isioma (born 2000/2001) is a Nigerian-American singer-songwriter and multiple-genre artist from Chicago. After Isioma's breakout song "Sensitive" went viral on TikTok in 2020, they (Note: Dreamer Isioma is nonbinary and uses they/them and he/him pronouns. This article uses they/them for consistency.) released a debut album titled Goodnight Dreamer in 2022. Their second album, Princess Forever, was released in 2023 by AWAL.

== Early life ==
Basically, my parents had a plan. They’re like, this child is either gonna do music or be an athlete or both.

– Dreamer Isioma, quoted in the Chicago Tribune

Dreamer Isioma grew up in a Christian household. They are from a Nigerian-American family. Their family moved often, and they spent their childhood in Lagos, London, and Chicago. In Chicago they began learning music theory at age three, and later studied classical piano and violin. They attended a Catholic school, where they experimented with gender expression within the confines of the school uniform. At 12 years old, they came out as queer, and later as nonbinary after a psychedelic experience in their late teenage years. Their eclectic fashion which mixes traditionally masculine and feminine components was profiled in Vogue.

In high school, Isioma attempted to switch from playing music to being an athlete, which was more socially acceptable. However, this change was prevented because they broke their wrist. When they were 16 years old, they began making music, with influences including Chief Keef and Paramore. Producing music became a serious passion while Isioma was still in high school; they routinely spent hours working on songs each day.

After high school, Isioma began attending college in Chicago; they initially planned to study marketing but switched to communications to avoid required math classes. In November 2021, they underwent a masculinizing chest surgery and expressed gender euphoria on social media.

== Career ==
Dreamer Isioma began making music professionally in 2018. In 2020, their song "Sensitive" went viral on TikTok, becoming their breakout hit. The song, which mixes R&B, hip hop, and funk influences, was later described in the Chicago Tribune as "a sonically playful wonder". It was featured in the final season of Insecure.

As a result of the success of "Sensitive", Isioma was able to access additional resources to create an album, working with a distributor and creative team and having a budget for the first time. Work began on the album in March 2020. They released two EPs in 2020, titled Sensitive and The Leo Sun Rises.

In 2021, Isioma made their debut tour, which included appearances at Lollapalooza and Austin City Limits.

Isioma released their debut album Goodnight Dreamer on February 23, 2022, after the release of a lead single and accompanying music video titled "Bad Ting". The album was distributed by AWAL. NME described the album as a blend of various influences including Afrobeats, rock and roll, and modern electronic and pop music, and praised it as feeling "genuinely fresh, newly discovered". MTV stated that the album is made up of "various soundscapes and themes of being one’s authentic self". WRBB gave the album four stars out of five, praising it as "an intriguingly beautiful commentary on love and sexuality" with "fresh androgynous musical style".

Asked in February 2022 by PAPER how they would describe their profession because of their output of visual music videos in addition to music, Isioma self-described as a "creative director" rather than specifically a "performer, songwriter or vocalist". They noted that while all their music is created in collaboration with friends, they "take a lot of pride in being the mastermind".

In April 2023, Isioma released a second album titled Princess Forever. Pitchfork included the album, which was distributed by AWAL, in a weekly list of new albums to listen to.

== See also ==
- Kehlani
- Young M.A
- Saucy Santana
