= United Sound Systems =

Recording studio in Detroit, United States

Coordinates: 42.36235°N 83.07236°W

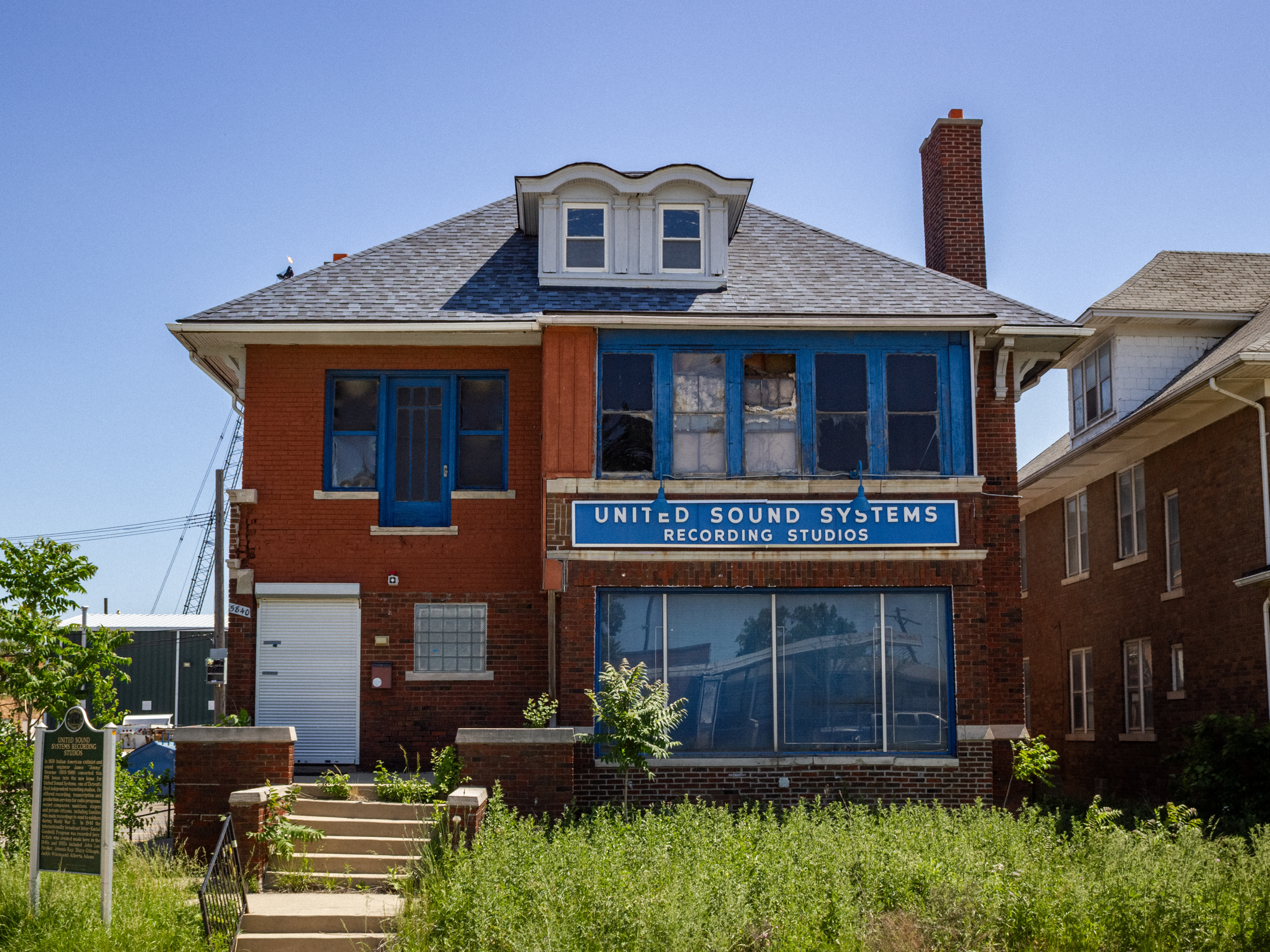
United Sound Systems in May 2024

United Sound Systems is a recording studio and locally designated historic district in Detroit, Michigan, United States. Many popular music artists over the last seventy years have recorded at the facility, including blues musicians like John Lee Hooker (he recorded "Boogie Chillen'" there in 1948), and funk bands like Parliament-Funkadelic. The studio was also the site of the first recording for Berry Gordy's Tamla label in 1959, starting what would become Motown Records. The building is threatened by a planned highway service drive expansion by the Michigan Department of Transportation. The studio ownership changed in 2009 and eventually reopened in 2014. It was designated a local historic district by the City of Detroit in 2015.

Others who have recorded at the studio include Aretha Franklin, Johnnie Ray, Dizzy Gillespie, The Rockets, Bob Seger, Jackie Wilson, Dan Schafer and Alberta Adams.

== History ==
There is currently a debate within collector forums and Detroit music historians about the origins of United. The issues revolve around when the first Cass location for the studio began and when it moved to the current location at 5840 Second Avenue. Regardless, it was listed at the current Second Avenue location by 1943.

The historical marker says that James Siracuse converted the current location to a recording studio in 1939. The house it is located in was built in 1916. The 1946 Inter-racial Goodwill Program was recorded here.

In March 2014, The Detroit News reported that:

"M-DOT spokesman Rob Morosi said they [MDOT] met with Scott last summer, and had 'a good conversation' about various options on the table. One of those options, he confirms, would be moving the studio from its location on Second at Antoinette. 'We’re waiting to hear back from them,' Morosi said Monday. (Scott says she’s exploring her options, but moving the large house and back studio is not what she favors.)"

Later in March, the Associated Press reported that the Detroit City Council "will refer the United Sound Systems Recording Studio matter to a historic designation advisory board for study." The National Park Service conducted a study of the site and the Blue Bird Inn in 2019 but found they were not suitable to be an affiliated area of the national park system.

== Selected recordings ==
Album or song	Artist	Date	Notes
"I'd Rather Be With You"	Bootsy's Rubber Band	1975-1976	The album was recorded at United Sound Systems around the same time as Parliament's Mothership Connection and Funkadelic's Let's Take It To The Stage.
"Bluebird" and others	Charlie Parker	December 21, 1947	Recordings for Savoy Records. The group also featured Miles Davis, Duke Jordan, Tommy Potter, and Max Roach.
"Boogie Chillen"	John Lee Hooker	1948	
"Come to Me (Marv Johnson song)"	Marv Johnson	Recorded "late 1958"	
"Freakin Out"	Death (proto-punk band)	1975	Group featured David Hackney, Dannis Hackney, and Bobby Hackney
"Sisters Are Doin' It for Themselves"	Eurythmics and Aretha Franklin	1985	
