= Papi Juice =

American art collective

Papi Juice is Brooklyn-based Q.T.P.O.C. art collective and nightlife party. Papi Juice was founded in 2013 by resident DJs Adam Rhodes and Oscar Nñ and visual artist Mohammed Fayaz. The artwork made from the collective's fliers has been featured in post-Stonewall museum exhibitions at venues like the Brooklyn Museum of Art, they have taught workshops at MoMA PS1, and participated in the BOFFO Performance Festival on Fire Island.

== History ==
The collective throws a nightlife party every other month on residency at Elsewhere in Brooklyn. Their shared missions is to bring queer and trans people of color together. Music played at the parties are by many different musicians with different sounds including hip-hop, Top 40, techno, and guaracha. Performers have included Princess Nokia, Jay Boogie, Juliana Huxtable, BbyMutha, Forrest Wu, Brandon Washington, and DJ Pauli Cakes. They are inspired by similar parties thrown throughout New York City's nightlife history such as iBomba, Azucar in Bed Stuy, Paradise Garage and Clit Club in the East Village, Discwomen and RAGGA in Bushwick, GHE20G0TH1K and Bubble_T, and more.
