= Listography =

Social networking site centred on lists

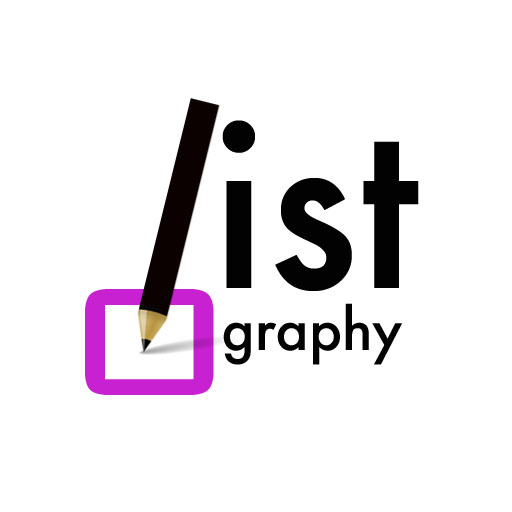
- Website type: Social networking service
- Available in: English
- Headquarters: San Francisco
- Owner: Private
- Creator: Lisa Nola
- Website: http://listography.com/
- Registration: Required / free
- Launched: 2006

Listography is a web application and a series of guided journals created by Lisa Nola and published by Chronicle Books. The project began in 2006 as an online platform that allows users to create and share personal lists. The concept later expanded into a book series, which has sold over one million copies and has been translated into multiple languages. In 2016, a tabletop game based on the concept was also released.

== History ==
Listography.com launched in 2006 as a social network for creating and archiving lists. It was highlighted in Boing Boing Television's premiere episode as a tool for capturing one's autobiography in list form.

The term "listography," coined by Lisa Nola, refers to an autobiography composed entirely of lists.

The first book, Listography Journal: Your Life in Lists, was published in October 2007 by Chronicle Books. The success of the book led to a series of themed titles, as well as Listography: The Game in 2016.

== Concept ==
Listography encourages autobiographical list-making as a way to document life events, preferences, and aspirations. Common list types include autobiographical memories, favorites, goals, wishlists, catalogues, and photo lists. Nola has described the approach as an accessible way to preserve memory and identity through short-form entries.

== Books ==
- Listography Journal: Your Life in Lists (2007)
- My Listography: My Amazing Life in Lists (2008)
- Love Listography: Your Love Life in Lists (2008)
- Music Listography: Your Life in (Play)Lists (2009)
- Friends Listography: Our Lives in Lists (2010)
- My Future Listography: All I Hope to Do in Lists (2011)
- Film Listography: Your Life in Movie Lists (2012)
- Parenthood Listography: My Kid in Lists (2013)
- Travel Listography: Exploring the World in Lists (2013)
- Literary Listography: My Reading Life in Lists (2014)
- Food Listography: My Delicious Life in Lists (2015)
- Listography: The Game (2016)
- Spirit Listography: My Inner Self in Lists (2016)
- One List a Day (2019)
- Date Night In (2020)
- Mini Memoir (2022)

== Reception ==
Listography and its books have been covered by several media outlets:

- Wired profiled the project as a new form of autobiography.
- The Boston Globe described the series as a way to document life through lists.
- CNN Entertainment highlighted the books in a feature on year-end lists.
- USA Today and other outlets have also featured Listography in lifestyle coverage.
