= The Smyrk =

American alternative rock band

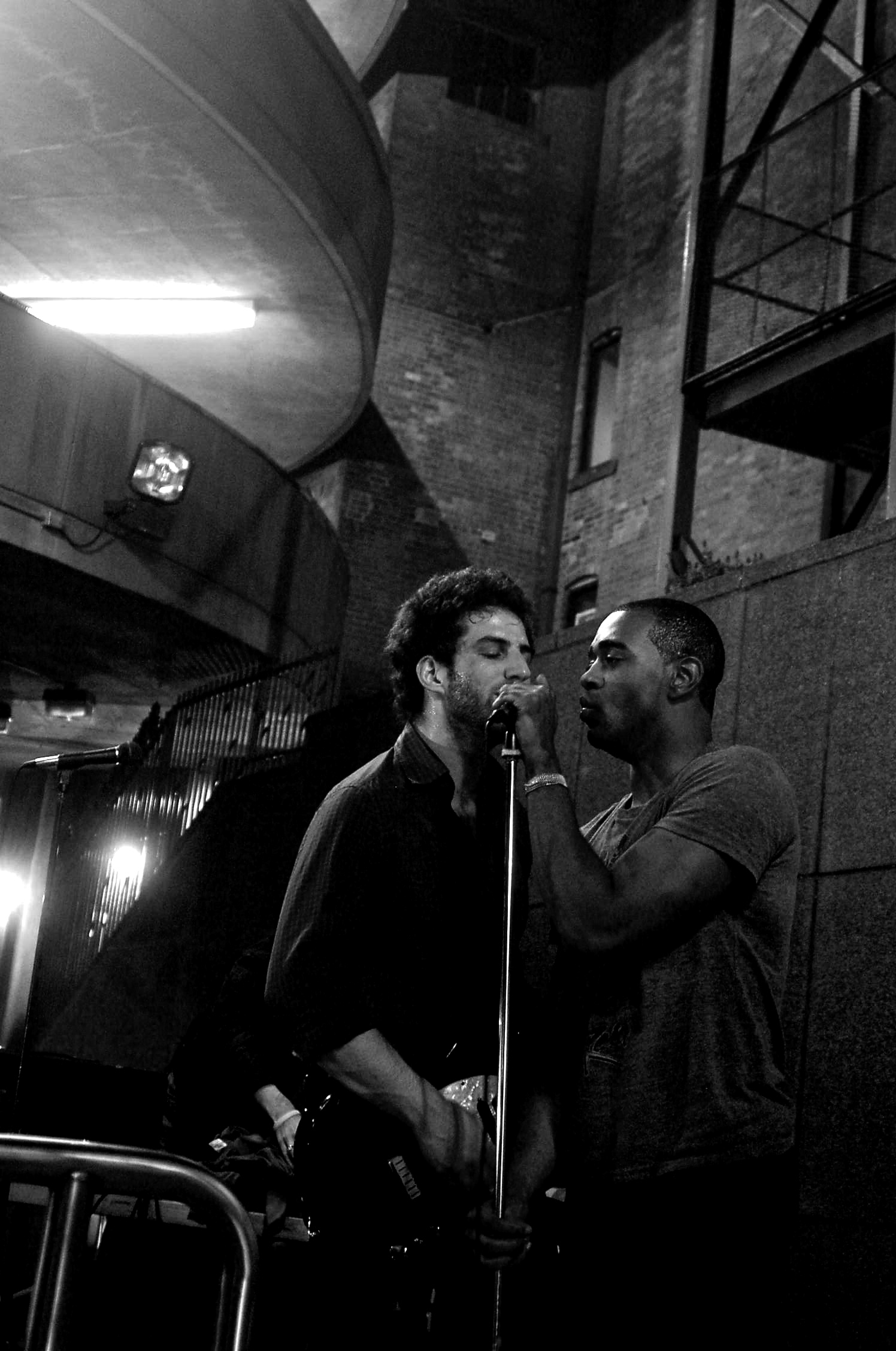
- The Smyrk

Background information
- Origin: New Haven, Connecticut
- Genres: Alternative rock
- Years active: 2003–present
- Label: Unsigned
- Members: Chris Barone (drums); Doron Flake (vocals); David Marvuglio (bass); Ari Sadowitz (guitar); Jason Todd
- Past members: Nick Logan (guitarist, now with My American Heart); Alex Marans (bass); Mike Russo (bass)
- Website: http://www.thesmyrk.com/

The Smyrk is a band from New Haven, Connecticut. The members are Doron Flake, Ari Sadowitz, Chris Barone and David Marvuglio.

== History ==
The Smyrk formed in 2003, when singer Doron Flake joined up with instrumental trio of guitarist/bassists Nick Logan and Ari Sadowitz, along with drummer Chris Barone, who had been playing the Connecticut club circuit under the name "Canine Smirk."

The Smyrk announced their breakup on July 21, 2008, with a final show on July 29. In January 2009, The Smyrk announced its reformation.

== Independent success ==
Monsters on Maple Street the band's debut EP was produced with Eric Rachel (Saves the Day, Dillinger Escape Plan) and mastered by Alan Douches (Thrice, Run DMC) at West West Side Music. The self-released record garnered praise from sources such as AbsolutePunk.net.

After the EP circulated around the internet and the band toured the Northeast, playing over 300 shows, Monsters on Maple Street caught the ear of Incubus bassist and former Roots guitarist Ben Kenney. The band then set out on tour, performing across the country and back, including performing in Los Angeles for Kenney, who invited them to record at his home in August 2006. Monsters on Maple Street was picked up for distribution by Mr. Kenney's label, Ghetto Crush, and quickly became a top seller on the label's website, .

The Smyrk traveled to Los Angeles in August 2006 to record six new tracks for the album New Fiction. This album was recorded over a month in Mr. Kenney's home studio.

In October 2007, The Smyrk was chosen as one of the top 6 out of approximately 4,000 bands to compete in MTV2's Dew Circuit Breakout, a TV battle of the bands sponsored by Mountain Dew. MTV2's contest has brought to the music spotlight bands such as Halifax (Band), the 2006 winner and Taking Back Sunday.

In late 2008, The Smyrk recorded 2 new songs with Bryan Russell (Envy on the Coast, Straylight Run, Coldplay).

The band showcased at the 2009 South By Southwest music festival in Austin, Texas.

In January 2009, singer Doron Flake was featured on Stratford, CT alternative/metal band Tempest Edge's track "Against the Wall," off of their E.P. The Creation.

They released 2 new songs, again recorded with Bryan Russell, in fall 2009.

In late 2009, The Smyrk did an interview with underground music website Madeloud.com. In 2010, the guitarist and bass player left the band, leaving the remaining members to perform with substitute musicians.

In late 2011 The Smyrk announced that they would be fully reuniting, with the lineup consisting of original members Doron Flake, Ari Sadowitz, and Chris Barone, as well as new bass player Mike Russo. In 2012, the band played shows at clubs in the Northeast, and wrote new, as-of-yet unreleased material. This was followed by a brief hiatus. The Smyrk regrouped in 2014, welcoming bassist David Marvuglio into the band.

== Nerd Rock ==
The Smyrk composes songs about numerous topics, but frequently write about literary and cinematic characters from comic books and sci-fi/cult films.

"Dial V for Venom" is the jilted symbiote's song of rejection after his separation from Peter Parker. The song references the sleight of Spider-Man's "red right hand, tap-tap and thumbs out", being "close as the blood" (Venom symbiotes have hidden in the host's bloodstreams) and being Spider-Man's armor. It even calls their relationship a Rorschach spot, demonstrating how it proved Venom was mentally abnormal from his alien race, bonding with Spider-Man instead of just wanting to feed on him.

"The Ballad of Fletcher Reede" is a reimagining of Jim Carrey's predicament in the film Liar Liar. The song makes reference to "The Claw" and uses the quote "I hold myself in contempt, why should (this court) be any different??"

"The End of Jason Todd" is an open letter from Joker to Batman after he murdered Jason Todd. Specifically, Joker refers to Batman's "soldiers" being unprepared for war and the difference between being the joke and the punchline. Also, Joker seems to be an Erykah Badu fan, as he mentions being "an artist and I'm sensitive about it."

"Farewell to Arm" is Ashley J. Williams' explanation of what happened at the doomed cabin from the Evil Dead series.

"Single Serving Friend" is a chronicle of the last hour of Fight Club. It even makes melodic reference to The Pixies' song "Where Is My Mind?" from the ending scene.

The Smyrk has tweeted about new songs based on characters from Thor, Kill Bill, Namor & the Fantastic Four and Scott Pilgrim.

== Media coverage ==
You'll really set aside the fact that you've heard nothing like this and welcome these new grooves with open arms... A call to all label execs or otherwise still reading: get interested in these guys, [they] have made my summer a whole lot better. - AbsolutePunk.net

"When a band comes along that actually sounds different, it makes people pay attention and makes people curious to hear more. One such band is New Haven, Connecticut's The Smyrk... simply a sound that is different and striking." - rockpress.net

"Volatile and edgy. They now put soul into post-hardcore, playing jazz chords with the energy of a punk band. The band's garnering great press from far and wide...The Smyrk's going places." - New Haven Advocate

"[The Smyrk] offers a taste for nuance married perfectly with the all-out aggression of power chord rock. At the core of it is guitar work, which trades tired licks for thoughtful ornament, cliché for relentless riffs dispensed with digital precision. With a studio sound honed to perfection... The Smyrk deliver a live show that is all that and more." - Brooklyn Academy of Music

"We do believe that they've got something that's pretty special." - Play Magazine Philadelphia

"Polite but quite righteous." - The Village Voice

== Discography ==
| Release date | Title |
|---|---|
| October 10, 2003 | The Smyrk |
| May 5, 2004 | The Hartt Sessions |
| August 10, 2005 | Monsters on Maple Street |
| March 23, 2007 | New Fiction |
| May 6, 2008 | 2008 Exclusive |
| November 9, 2009 | 3ongs |
