= Suffrajett =

American rock band

- Origin: New York City, United States
- Genres: Garage punk • hard rock
- Years active: 2000–present
- Label: Cobra Music
- Members: Simi Sernaker; Jason Chasko; Kevin Roberts; Danny Severson

Suffrajett is an American rock band from New York City, currently based in Chicago, Illinois, composed of singer/violinist Simi Sernaker, guitarist Jason Chasko, bassist Kevin Roberts, and drummer Danny Severson. Suffrajett has toured with Local H, The Last Vegas, and Bob Schneider, and have opened for the reunited MC5. Suffrajett released their self-titled debut album on February 2, 2003, and their latest album Black Glitter was released on January 1, 2007. They have toured with Juliette and the Licks and Scissors for Lefty.

Suffrajett is a homophone of Suffragette.

== Discography ==
=== Albums ===
- Suffrajett (February 2, 2003) released on in Music We Trust Records
- Black Glitter (January 1, 2007) released on Cobra Music

=== EPs ===
- Suffrajett EP (September 25, 2005) released on Giant Step Records

=== Singles ===
- "Mr. Man"
- "Closer"
- "Anybody Listening"

== Trivia ==
- Simi was a part of the Sistagrrl Riott
- Suffrajett appeared in the film, I'll Always Know What You Did Last Summer, with their song "Between You and Me" (Written by Jason Chasko, Simantha Sernaker and Wesley Kidd)
- Jason Chasko had worked with Liz Phair as co-songwriter and co-producer on Phair's Whitechocolatespaceegg
- Simantha Sernaker performs on Local H's "Hand's on the Bible" from their album Here Comes the Zoo
- Simantha Sernaker appeared in the comedy short Strike! as Niki
- Simi played the violin with Badawi aka – Raz Mesinai
