= Tamar-kali =

American singer-songwriter and composer

- Born: Tamara Colletta Brown; October 8
- Origin: Brooklyn, NY, United States
- Genre: Alt rock
- Occupations: Vocalist, composer, singer-songwriter
- Instruments: Vocals, guitar
- Years active: 2005–present
- Label: OyaWarrior Records
- Website: Tamar-kali.com

Tamara Colletta Brown, better known as Tamar-kali, is an American rock singer-songwriter and composer based in Brooklyn, New York.

== Early life ==
Tamar-kali was born and raised in Brooklyn, a second-generation musician through her father, who was a band leader and played bass and drums in local funk and soul bands. Her father had studied with Keter Betts in Harlem, and her great-uncle is singer Archie Bell. Due to spending the summers of her childhood with her mother's family on St. Helena Island, South Carolina Tamar-kali developed a deep appreciation for her Gullah roots, a mixture of Indigenous Southern U.S. and West African customs and languages. About her music background, Tamar-kali said, "My family had a little juke joint in the south where my mom is from, so bands would come through there. Sometimes, my dad would have me sit in with the band, so I was singing with live instrumentation from a young age. The tradition of music was a part of my life growing up. It was a resource and had a lot to do with my development...Being rooted in Gullah culture and having that identity allowed me as a child, a black girl in America, growing up in Brooklyn, I didn't feel like I sprouted out of this concrete."

Raised Catholic, Tamar-kali attended Catholic school for 13 years, which she credits for her rebellious nature and sound. She grew up with an eclectic appreciation for music with influences from home and choral classical training at school. While in high school, she studied choral singing and music theory. She learned to play guitar and bass, and was mostly self-taught. Her musical inspirations include PJ Harvey, Grace Jones, The Mars Volta, Deftones, Betty Davis, Patti Smith, Archie Bell and the Drells, Ray, Goodman and Brown, Crown Heights Affair, Prince and Quicksand.

In the early 1990s, Tamar-kali began performing in the East Village with the bands Funkface and Song of Seven. In 1997, Tamar-kali created Sista Grrrl as a collective by and for Black women and girls, in response to the marginalization of women of color in riot grrrl. After fronting the band Song of Seven with men, Tamar-kali teamed up with three other Black women to organize a series of shows known as Sista Grrrl Riots. The Sista Grrrl movement was foundational to contemporary Afro-punk.

Tamar-kali attended Adelphi University where she studied English Education. She teaches and has become very involved in the North African dance art form Raqs Sharqi as well as Middle Eastern Belly Dance.

The "kali" in her performing name is inspired by the Hindu goddess Kali.

== Career ==
After tenures as a member of Funkface and Song of Seven, Tamar-kali became a solo writer, musician and composer in 1997. According to MTV.com, Tamar-kali was considered a "favorite" on the New York City underground punk rock music scene. She rose to prominence starring in James Spooner's award-winning documentary Afro-Punk (2003). The indie film spotlighted her performances and made her the official face for the DVD cover artwork. Her work as a vocalist and composer are influenced by other disciplines including literature, philosophy, visual art and cinema.

=== Performances and recordings ===
As a vocalist Tamar-kali has supported artists like Fishbone on tour and OutKast on the group's second album, ATLiens. She has shared the stage with Paramore, Roger Waters, Meshell Ndegeocello and The Roots. She has also shared the stage with Dub War, Joi, Carl Hancock Rux, Cassandra Wilson, Saul Williams, The Dirtbombs, Jean Grae and Earl Greyhound.

Tamar-kali has performed in such venues as Brooklyn Academy of Music and Lincoln Center, sometimes paying tribute to Nina Simone, Betty Davis and Odetta. Tamar-kali was the musical director for the Black Rock Coalition's Tribute to Nina Simone which held concerts in New York City (2003, 2009 and 2010) as well as Paris and the South of France (2009). In August 2009 she performed at the BRC Orchestra's "Four Women: A Salute to Miriam Makeba, Eartha Kitt, Abbey Lincoln and Odetta" at Damrosch Park in Lincoln Center.

In 2006 Tamar-kali released her first music video for the single "Boot" off her debut EP Geechee Goddess Hardcore Warrior Soul. Her "masterful guitar playing" combined with various types of self-representation in the video suggested "multiple possibilities of women's gender performance." The theme dealt with a young black girl lacking awareness of her own beauty, being left vulnerable to sexual exploitation. In 2007 Tamar-kali toured Europe. Her debut studio album, Black Bottom, was released in Fall 2010 on the OyaWarrior label.

Tamar-kali often performs with her Psychochamber Ensemble of Strings. This experimental chamber ensemble performed at the Museum of Modern Art.

In 2018, Tamar-kali created the multi-disciplinary project Demon Fruit Blues for Harlem Stage WaterWorks, during a residency at Mabou Mines in New York City where the work premiered. Billboard said the work "explores the Biblical roots of misogyny through a combination of rock, gospel and blues suffused with classical and African roots music." This project was entirely composed by Tamar-Kali with instrumentation including acoustic guitar, harp, violin, viola, cello, and bass. The composition was informed and motivated by her own life as a black woman and artist.

=== Composing ===
Tamar-kali is a frequent collaborator with director Dee Rees. The first feature film that Tamar-kali scored was Rees' Mudbound (2017), for which Tamar-kali won the World Soundtrack Award in the Discovery of the Year category. The film marked Tamar-kali's third collaboration with the director after appearing in Pariah (2011), which was Rees' first feature film, and writing a song for Bessie (2015) on HBO. For Pariah, Tamar-kali also sang a cover of Gossip's "Fire With Fire" for the ending credits. For Bessie, Tamar-kali provided a few songs on the soundtrack including her own vocals, as well as performing with her band in one of the scenes. Tamar-kali and Rees have cultivated a relationship given the fact that they are both two black women in a male dominated field; Tamar-kali attributes her film scoring career to Rees.

Tamar-kali has since scored other feature films including Come Sunday (2018), The Lie (2018), The Assistant (2019), and Shirley (2020). In 2020 Tamar-kali also composed the score to Rees' adaptation of Joan Didion's The Last Thing He Wanted, as well the score for Dawn Porter's documentary John Lewis: Good Trouble. Tamar-kali composed the score for the 2023 documentary Little Richard: I Am Everything. Hollywood Music in Media Awards (HMMA) has nominated several of Tamar-kali's film scores for Best Original Score. In 2021, Shirley received a SCL Award nomination from the Society of Composers & Lyricists for Outstanding Original Score for an Independent Film.

During a 2019 interview for BBC Music Magazine, Tamar-kali discussed how her career as an independent artist contributed to her career in film scoring, while also learning about technology to a greater extent, in addition to working with a director.

Tamar-Kali has also composed and arranged music for her string sextet and voice project Psychochamber Ensemble.

== Discography ==
=== Albums ===
- Geechee Goddess Hardcore Warrior Soul EP, (OyaWarrior Records, 2005)
- Black Bottom LP, (OyaWarrior Records, 2010)

=== Singles ===
- "Boot" (2006)

https://www.youtube.com/watch?v=-6-WQTjiIyU

- "Pearl" remix f/ Jean Grae (2010)

https://www.youtube.com/watch?v=2Daxf8GDa5c
