= Death (proto-punk band) =

American rock band

- The three original members: David, Bobby, and Dannis Hackney

Background information
- Origin: Detroit, Michigan, U.S.
- Genres: Punk rock; proto-punk; garage rock; funk (early)
- Years active: 1971–1977; 2009–present
- Labels: Tryangle; Drag City
- Spinoffs: Rough Francis
- Members: Bobby Hackney Sr. Dannis Hackney; Julian Hackney
- Past members: David Hackney; Bobbie Duncan
- Website: deathfromdetroit.com

Death is an American musical group formed in Detroit, Michigan, in 1971 by brothers Bobby (bass, vocals), David (guitar), and Dannis Hackney (drums, percussion).

The trio initially started as a funk group but quickly switched their style to rock after seeing concerts by the Who and Alice Cooper. Music critic Peter Margasak retrospectively wrote that David "pushed the group in a hard-rock direction that presaged punk, and while this certainly didn't help them find a following in the mid-70s, today it makes them look like visionaries" – David himself having been called "the visionary of the group". Publications such as Gawker have named them as one of the first punk rock bands. The band broke up in 1977, but unexpected interest in their music resulted in independent record label Drag City releasing their unreleased recordings from 1975 in 2009, and the band reforming.

== History ==
=== Formation (1964–1975) ===
In 1964, the three young Hackney brothers (David, Bobby and Dannis) watched the Beatles' first appearance on The Ed Sullivan Show with their father. The following day, David found a discarded guitar in an alley and used it to start learning to play. Brothers Bobby and Dannis soon followed suit and they began playing music together. Later, the young trio purchased the best instruments that they could afford with the money that their mother won in a car accident settlement.

The brothers practiced and recorded early demos in a room in the family home and performed their earliest gigs from their garage. Forming in 1971 and originally calling themselves Rock Fire Funk Express, guitarist David convinced his brothers to change the band's name to Death in 1973 after their father died in an accident. David wanted to change the meaning of the word: "His concept was spinning death from the negative to the positive. It was a hard sell", Bobby Hackney recalled in 2010. The name distinguished them from other all-black bands; their musical style, an innovation on an already evident musical approach in Detroit, further demarcated Death, "no doubt" the first all-black punk band.

=== Album recording and dissolution (1975–1977) ===
On February 18, 1975, Death recorded seven songs written by David and Bobby at Detroit's United Sound Systems with engineer Jim Vitti. According to the Hackney family, Columbia Records president Clive Davis funded the recording sessions but implored the band to change its name to something more commercially palatable. When the Hackneys refused, Davis ceased his support. Bobby and Dannis were tentative about this decision, ultimately prioritizing the brotherly relationship. The band only recorded seven songs instead of the planned dozen. The following year they self-released a single taken from these sessions on their label Tryangle Records. The single "Politicians in My Eyes" b/w "Keep On Knocking" saw a run of only 500 copies.

The Hackney brothers ended the band in 1977. The brothers then moved to Burlington, Vermont, and released two albums of gospel rock as The 4th Movement in the early 1980s. David moved back to Detroit in 1982 and died of lung cancer in 2000. Bobby and Dannis still reside in Vermont and lead the reggae band Lambsbread. Dannis is currently the drummer for the Vermont-based rock/funk band The Aerolites.

=== Rediscovery and reformation (2009–present) ===
Copies of the "Politicians in My Eyes" 7", and the story of Death continued to circulate in collector's circles, with some copies selling for $800 due to their extreme rarity; one source of them was Don Schwenk, a friend of the Hackneys who was originally commissioned to create the album art for the upcoming LP, and was given a box of the singles in exchange. MP3s of the two songs from the single eventually found their way to Chunklet in 2008; around this time Bobby Hackney's son Julian moved to California and heard the Death songs after a recommendation of a roommate and immediately recognized his father's voice. Once the news of the discovery and the story of Death began to spread, it eventually reached Drag City Records, who contacted the Hackneys about the possible release of the album, who provided the label with the original master tape: In 2009, Drag City released all seven Death songs from their 1975 United Sound sessions on CD and LP under the title ...For the Whole World to See.

In the meantime, the sons of Bobby Hackney (Julian, Urian, and Bobby Jr.), wanting to get the word out more, started a band called Rough Francis (named after a nickname occasionally used by their uncle David), covering the songs of Death after discovering the old recordings online. A March 2009 article in The New York Times by Mike Rubin, covering one of Rough Francis' live shows and the history of Death introduced the band to an even wider audience. The popularity eventually reached Mickey Leigh, who invited both bands to play Joey Ramone's birthday party. In September 2009, a reformed Death played three shows with original members Bobby and Dannis Hackney, with Lambsbread guitarist Bobbie Duncan taking the place of the late David Hackney. During a 2010 performance at the Boomslang Festival in Lexington, Kentucky, the band announced that Drag City would release a new album with demos and rough cuts that predate the 1975 sessions. The album Spiritual • Mental • Physical was released in January 2011. In 2014, Death released their third studio album III, and in 2015 their most recent record, entitled N.E.W. was released.

== Artistry ==
David was integral to the band's style, that of mysticism and "eccentric spirituality".

== Band members ==
=== Current ===
- Bobby Hackney Sr. – vocals, bass (1964–1977, 2009–present)
- Dannis Hackney – drums (1964–1977, 2009–present)
- Julian Hackney – guitar (2023–present)
- Urian Hackney – guitar (2023–present)

=== Former ===
- David Hackney – guitars (1964–1977, died 2000)
- Bobbie Duncan – guitars (2009–2023)

== Discography ==
=== As the 4th Movement ===
- The 4th Movement LP (released 1980 by Tryangle Records)
- Totally LP (released 1982 by Tryangle Records)

=== As RockFire Funk Express ===
- "People Save the World" / "RockFire Funk Express" 7" single (recorded 1973, released 2013 by Third Man Records)

=== As Death ===
- "Politicians in My Eyes" b/w "Keep On Knocking" 7" single (recorded 1975, released 1976 by Tryangle Records, reissued 2013 by Drafthouse Films)
- "Where Do We Go From Here" 7" single (recorded 1976, released 1980 by Tryangle Records)
- ...For the Whole World to See (recorded 1975, released 2009 by Drag City)
- Spiritual • Mental • Physical (recorded 1974–76, released 2011 by Drag City)
- "Relief" online single (released 2012 by CD Baby)
- Raw demo recording of "Politicians in My Eyes" (recorded 1974, released 2013 online by Drafthouse Films)
- III (recorded 1975–1992, released 2014 by Drag City)
- N.E.W. (released 2015 by TryAngle Records)
- "Cease Fire" (released 2017 by TryAngle Records)
- "Give It Back" (released 2018 by TryAngle Records)
- "Death / Rough Francis" split (released 2023 by Drag City)

== Filmography ==
- A Band Called Death DVD/Blu-ray (2013, Drafthouse Films)

== Popular culture ==
- Their song "Freakin' Out" was used in a 2010 episode of the sitcom How I Met Your Mother entitled "False Positive" (season 6, episode 12) and the 2015 Ash vs. Evil Dead episode "The Killer of Killers" (season 1, episode 6).
- The song "Politicians in My Eyes" was used in Season 7, Episode 5 ("Bottoms Up") of the HBO series Entourage in 2010.
- In 2011, their song "You're a Prisoner" was used in the film Kill the Irishman.
- An independent documentary film about the band titled A Band Called Death, directed by Jeff Howlett and Mark Covino, was released in 2012.
- The songs "Politicians in My Eyes" and "Keep On Knocking" were both featured in season 4, episode 13 of Childrens Hospital in 2012.
- In 2014, the band's song "Politicians in My Eyes" was featured in the surf documentary Strange Rumblings in Shangri-La.
- A version of "Where Do We Go from Here" with the vocals edited out is often used as bumper music during Wayne Resnick's Sunday night show on KFI AM 640.
- In 2015, the band's song "Keep On Knocking" was featured as part of the Tony Hawk's Pro Skater 5 video game soundtrack.
- The song "Politicians in My Eyes" was used in the pilot episode of the Comedy Central series Detroiters in 2017, as well as the song "Freakin Out" in the sixth episode of the same series.
- In 2018, the band's song "Politicians in My Eyes" was featured as the theme song for season two of Gimlet Media's podcast Crimetown.
- The song "Politicians in My Eyes" was featured in the 2019 movie Native Son. The rare record single was also a plot point during the film.
- The song "Freakin Out" was featured in the 2022 stop-motion horror comedy movie Wendell and Wild.
- "Keep On Knocking" was included in the soundtrack for the 2022 film, Jackass Forever.
