= Pure Hell =

American punk rock band

- Origin: Philadelphia, Pennsylvania, U.S.
- Genre: Punk rock
- Years active: 1974–1979, 2012, 2024
- Past members: Kenny "Stinker" Gordon; Michael "Spider" Sanders; Preston "Chipper" Morris; Lenny "Steel" Boles

Pure Hell is an American punk rock band, established in Philadelphia, Pennsylvania, in 1974. It has been cited by Bad Brains "as an early influence".

== Career ==
Among the pioneers of the post-garage rock, post-acid rock, glam-theater era of the late 1960s and early 1970s, Pure Hell was among the first of its kind, comparable to the MC5, Sex Pistols, and Dead Boys. Commercially, the band had little success and only released one single, "These Boots Are Made for Walkin' " backed with "No Rules") and one album, Noise Addiction, which was unreleased for 28 years. Founding member writer/vocalist Kenny Gordon and drummer Spider of Pure Hell also have an unreleased album produced in the mid–1990s by former members of L.A. Guns, Nine Inch Nails and Lemmy Kilmister of Motörhead, entitled The Black Box. This album has Kilmister singing background vocals in a rare song titled "The Call". In 2012, Pure Hell reformed to play their first gig since 1979 at the Rebellion Festival at the Empress Ballroom in Blackpool alongside Rancid, Buzzcocks, Public Image Ltd and Social Distortion.

One of the first African-American proto-punk bands, Pure Hell formed in Philadelphia in 1974 and spent time playing in New York City too, eventually becoming friendly with the New York Dolls and even playing with Sid Vicious in 1978 when he moved to New York City. Curtis Knight, former R&B singer in the Squires, which also featured a young Jimi Hendrix on guitar, became their manager and oversaw their career. In addition to managing the band, he also produced one of the two sessions the band made – the other at the end of 1978 in London was amazingly recorded by the Groundhogs main man Tony McPhee. This London jaunt turned out to be the last hurrah for Pure Hell as Knight fell out badly with them and refused to release their album. Even a well-received UK tour and an appearance alongside the ascendant Subs at the Lyceum couldn't stop them splitting on their return stateside.

All they left behind was one single, a cover of the Nancy Sinatra song "These Boots Are Made For Walking"/"No Rules". They played a high power, energy-driven punk rock with more than a slight Hendrix-influenced guitar at some points. Some of their tracks, particularly "The Girl With The Hungry Eyes", (about Nancy Spungen, who charismatic lead singer Kenny Gordon knew from his schooldays) verge on proto–hardcore punk. The band proved influential on the emerging CBGB-based New York punk scene.

In 2016, an acetate record with two of their songs, "Wild One" and "Courageous Cat" went for sale on eBay, where it was purchased by Henry Rollins and released on his label.

Kenny has since stated that he doesn't want to be "remembered just because we were black," but also as being a part of the first tier of punk in the '70s. Most recent live performances include select venues and events on the East Coast, including AfroPunk Festival at the Brooklyn Academy of Music, WFMU radio in Jersey City, New Jersey, and the Brighton Bar in Long Branch, New Jersey. Pure Hell reformed to perform at the Mosswood Meltdown Festival, in Oakland, California, on July 7, 2024.

== Members ==
- Kenny "Stinker" Gordon – vocals/ writer (bass on Wild One and No Rules)
- Michael "Spider" Sanders – drums
- Preston "Chipper" Morris – guitar
- Lenny "Steel" Boles – bass

== Guest Performers on Recordings & Video ==
- Lemmy Kilmister - bass on Wild One / background vocals on The Call 1993
- Carlos Bernier – lead guitar (recorded on The Black Box album)
- Gary Neal – bass (recorded on the Black Box album)
- Tommy Teofilak – bass (recorded on the Black Box album)
- Theodore LeBrun – rhythm guitar (recorded on The Black Box album)
- Mick Moore – lead guitar (1991–1992, live performances – Hollywood TV / L.A. Riot)
- Jerry Dread - bass (1990 live performances, live video & studio recordings)

== External sources ==
- The Forgotten Story of Pure Hell, America’s First Black Punk Band - Dazed Magazine
- Swindle article
- James Porter and Jake Austen, "Black Punk Time: Blacks in Punk, New Wave and Hardcore 1976–1984 (Part 3)", from Roctober #32, 2002
- How Black Musicians Have Influenced Punk Music | PBS News 2025
