= List of punk films =

This is a list of films about the punk subculture and/or the music genre.

== 0-9 ==
- 24 Hour Party People (2002)

== A ==
- A Punk Daydream (2019, documentary) - Jimmy Hendrickx
- Arada (2018) - Mu Tunc
- Afro-punk (2003, documentary)
- American Hardcore (2006, documentary) - Paul Rachman
- Another State of Mind (1984, documentary)

== B ==
- Bad Boy Bubby (1993) - Rolf de Heer
- A Band Called Death (2012 documentary)
- Bhakti Boy (2015) - Joy Marzec
- The Blank Generation (1976, documentary) - Amos Poe
- Blank Generation (1980) - Ulli Lommel
- Blitzkrieg Bop (1978)
- Big Time: Punk in Belfast (2006) - Roy Wallace
- Bilo jednom... (2006, documentary)
- Bloody Bloody Belgium (2014) - Roy Wallace
- Border Radio (1987)
- Botinada: A Origem do Punk no Brasil (2006) - Gastão Moreira
- Bomb City (2017, drama, real story)
- Breaking Glass (1980)
- Brothers of the Head (2005) - Brian Aldiss
- Bullet in a Bible (2006, documentary)
- Burning Down the House: The Story of CBGB (2009, documentary)
- Burst City (1982)
- Black and White Statement (1980 documentary VPRO ) by Dick Rijneke & Mildred van Leeuwaarden.

== C ==
- CBGB (2013)
- Cha Cha (1979) - Herman Brood
- The Clash: Westway to the World (2000, documentary)
- Class of 1984 (1982)
- Class of Nuke 'Em High (1986)
- Control (2007) - Anton Corbijn
- Crash 'n' Burn (1977 short film) - Ross McLaren
- Crazy Thunder Road (1980)

== D ==
- The Day the Country Died (2007, documentary) - Roy Wallace
- A Day in the Life (2003) - Stratford Mercenaries, Roy Wallace
- The Decline of Western Civilization (1981, documentary) - Penelope Spheeris
- The Decline of Western Civilization III (1998, documentary) - Penelope Spheeris
- Dečko Koji Obećava (1981, Yugoslavia)
- Desperate Teenage Lovedolls (1984) - David Markey
- D.O.A.: A Rite of Passage (1981, documentary) - Lech Kowalski
- Dogs in Space (1986)

== E ==
- Ebba the Movie (1982, documentary)
- End of the Century: The Story of the Ramones (2004, documentary)
- Engel & Joe (2001) - Vanessa Jopp
- Ex Drummer (2007) - Koen Mortier

== F ==
- Filmage: The Story of Descendants/All (2013, documentary)
- The Filth and the Fury (2000, documentary) - Julien Temple
- Finding Joseph I: The HR From Bad Brains Documentary (2017, documentary)
- Fokofpolisiekar: Forgive Them for They Know Not What They Do (2009, documentary)
- F*cking Åmål (1998, Sweden) - Lukas Moodysson

== G ==
- Garage Days (2002) - Alex Proyas
- Ghost World (2001)
- Gleaming the Cube (1989)
- Rise Against: Generation Lost (2006, documentary)
- Glory Daze (1996) (Ben Affleck)
- Glue (2006) (Alexis Dos Santos)
- Good Vibrations (2013)
- The Great Rock 'n' Roll Swindle (1980) - Julien Temple
- Groeten uit Rotterdam (1980 documentary VPRO) By Dick Rijneke & Mildred van Leeuwaarden
- Green Room (2015)

== H ==
- Halloween Pussy Trap Kill! Kill! (2017)
- Hard Core Logo (1996) - Bruce McDonald
- Hated: GG Allin and the Murder Junkies (1994, documentary) - Todd Phillips
- How to Talk to Girls at Parties (2017) - John Cameron Mitchell
- Hype! (1996, documentary) - Doug Pray
- Huize Schoonderloo (1980, documentary) - Dick Rijneke

== I ==
- I Believe - in Buzzcock (tbr) - Roy Wallace
- Inner Terrestrials (2010) - Roy Wallace
- Instrument (1998, documentary) - Jem Cohen

== J ==
- Jesus Christ Vampire Hunter (2002) - Lee Demarbre
- Joe Strummer: The Future Is Unwritten (2007, documentary) - Julien Temple
- Jubilee (1977) - Derek Jarman

== K ==
- King of Punk (2007, documentary) - Kenneth van Schooten and Julie van Schooten

== L ==
- Ladies and Gentlemen, The Fabulous Stains (1981)
- The Last Pogo (1978, documentary) - Colin Brunton
- Let Them Know: The Story of Youth Brigade and BYO Records (2011)
- Liquid Sky (1982)
- The Little Punker (1992) - Michael Schaack
- Loren Cass (2006)
- Los Bastardos (2009) - Gestapo Khazi
- The Lost Boys (1987)
- Lovedolls Superstar (1986) - David Markey
- Luster (2002) - Everett Lewis

== M ==
- Margins (2022)
- Modern Angels (2000) - Roy Wallace
- Mondo New York (1988)
- The Moon is a Hologram (2025) - Selene Kapsaski
- Mannen som elsket Yngve (2008)

== N ==
- Never Mind the Wall (2001)
- New York Doll (2005, documentary)
- Nightclubbing: The Birth of Punk Rock in NYC (2022, documentary)
- Night of the Comet (1984)
- Night of the Demons (1988)
- La Femme Nikita (1990) Luc Besson

== O ==
- One Nine Nine Four (2009)
- Out of the Blue (1980)
- Outsider (1997)

== P ==
- Panic High School (1978)
- Pank Nije Mrtav (2011)
- Pinkel (1982 film) by Dick Rijneke
- Planet Love (2000) - Roy Wallace
- Population: 1 (1986) - Rene Daalder
- Pump up the Volume (1990) - Allan Moyle
- Punk as Fuck (1997) - Roy Wallace
- Punk: Attitude (2005, documentary) - Don Letts
- Punk In Love (2009)
- Punk Love (2006)
- Punk Rock (1977, Adult Film/ Crime Drama) Carter Stevens
- Punk Rock Holocaust (2003)
- The Punk Rock Movie (also known as The Punk Rock Movie from England) (1978, documentary) - Don Letts
- The Punk Singer (2013, documentary) - Kathleen Hanna
- Punks (1984) - Sara Yaknni and Alberto Gieco
- Punk's Dead (2016)
- Punk's Not Dead (2007, documentary)
- Punk the Capital: Building a Sound Movement (2019, documentary)

== R ==
- Rad (1986) - Hal Needham
- The Ranger (2018)
- Razz: (The) Documentary (2023, documentary)
- Reform School Girls (1986) - Tom DeSimone
- Refused Are Fucking Dead (2006, documentary)
- Repo Man (1984) Alex Cox
- The Return of the Living Dead (1985)
- Rise Above: The Tribe 8 Documentary (2003, documentary)
- RISEN: A History of Amebix (2008) - Roy Wallace
- Roadkill (1989)
- Rock 'n' Roll High School (1979) - Allan Arkush
- Rodrigo D: No Future (1990) - Víctor Gaviria
- Rude Boy (1980)
- The Runaways (2010) - Floria Sigismondi

== S ==
- Salad Days (2014, documentary)
- S.F.W. (1994)
- She's Real, Worse Than Queer (1997, documentary) - Lucy Thane
- Shock Treatment (1981)
- Shonen Merikensack (2009)
- Shooting at the Moon (2003) - Jesse Richards
- Shuffle (1981)
- Sid and Nancy (aka Sid and Nancy: Love Kills) (1986) - Alex Cox
- Skinhead Attitude
- SLC Punk! (1999)
- Smithereens (1982) - Susan Seidelman, Richard Hell
- Spidarlings (2016) - Selene Kapsaski
- Straight to Hell (1987) - Alex Cox
- Suburbia (1984) - Penelope Spheeris
- subUrbia (1996) - Richard Linklater
- Subway (1985) - Luc Besson
- Summer of Sam (1999) - Spike Lee
- Surf Nazis Must Die (1987) Peter George

== T ==
- Tank Girl (1995) - Rachel Talalay
- Tapeheads (1988)
- Taqwacore: The Birth of Punk Islam (2009)
- The Taqwacores (2010)
- Terminal City Ricochet (1990)
- Terror Firmer (1999)
- There Is No Authority But Yourself (2006) - Alexander Oey; documentary about the history of Crass
- The House of Tomorrow (2017)
- Thrashin' (1986)
- Threat (2006)
- Times Square (1980)
- Tjenare Kungen (2005)
- Trainspotting (1996)
- Tromeo and Juliet (1996) - a punk version of the Shakespeare classic, co-written by James Gunn
- Trying It At Home (2014)
- Twisted Issues (1988)

== U ==
- Up in Smoke (1978)
- Urban Struggle (documentary)
- Urgh! A Music War (1981, documentary)

== V ==
- Valley Girl (1983)
- Vennaskond. Millennium (1998) - Tõnu Trubetsky

== W ==
- Wassup Rockers (2005) - Larry Clark
- We Are Fugazi From Washington, D.C. (2023, documentary)
- We Are the Best! (2013)
- We Jam Econo (2005, documentary)
- We're Outta Here! (1997)
- What to Do in Case of Fire? (2001) - Gregor Schnitzler
- What We Do Is Secret (2008) Rodger Grossman
- Who Killed Nancy? (2009)
- Wild Zero (2000)

== X ==
- X: The Unheard Music (documentary 1986)

== Y ==
- The Yo-Yo Gang (1992) - G. B. Jones
- You Weren't There: A History of Chicago Punk, 1977-1984 (2007) Joe Losurdo Christina Tillman

== See also ==
- Cyberpunk
  - Japanese cyberpunk
  - List of cyberpunk works
- List of skinhead films
- No Wave Cinema
- Remodernist Film
- Steampunk
  - List of steampunk works
