= Punk subculture =

Anti-establishment subculture

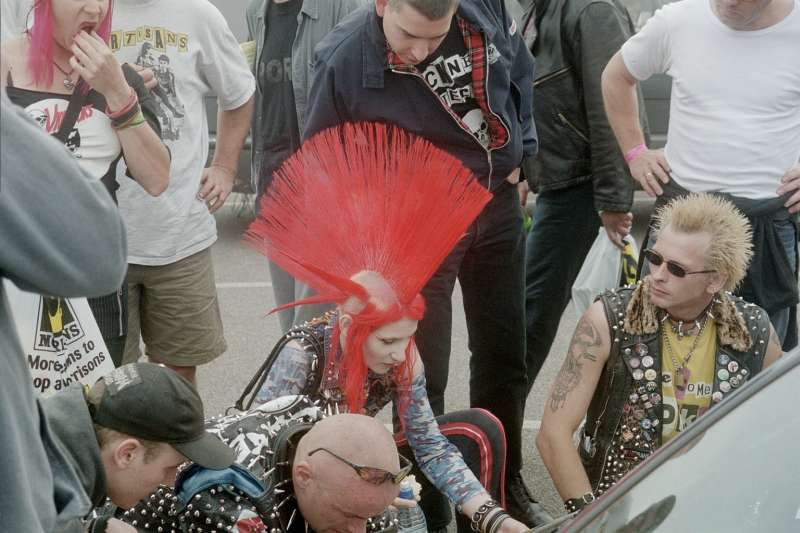
- Punk with a red mohawk at Holidays In The Sun Festival in Morecambe, England, in 2003
- Years active: 1974–present
- Country: United Kingdom and United States (origins); Worldwide
- Major figures: Sex Pistols, The Ramones, Iggy Pop,
- Influences: Primarily bikers, rockers, greasers, beatniks, mods, teds and glam rockers
- Influenced: Heavily inspired the hardcore punks, second wave skinheads, metalheads, grunge, goths, emos and scenesters

The punk subculture includes music, ideologies, fashion, visual art, dance, literature, film, and other forms of expression, largely characterised by anti-establishment views, the promotion of individual freedom, and DIY ethics.

Originating in punk rock music, the punk ethos is primarily made up of beliefs such as non-conformity, anti-authoritarianism, anti-corporatocracy, a do-it-yourself ethic, anti-consumerist, direct action, and not selling out.

Punk fashion, includes T-shirts, leather jackets, Dr. Martens boots, hairstyles such as brightly coloured hair and spiked mohawks, cosmetics, tattoos, jewellery, and body modification. Women in the hardcore scene typically wore clothing categorised as masculine. This included black, ripped jeans and tops.

Punk aesthetics determine the type of art punks enjoy and create, which typically has underground, minimalist, iconoclastic, and satirical sensibilities. The subculture has spread to many countries and has generated a considerable amount of poetry and prose, and its own underground press in the form of zines. Many punk-themed films have been made.

== History ==
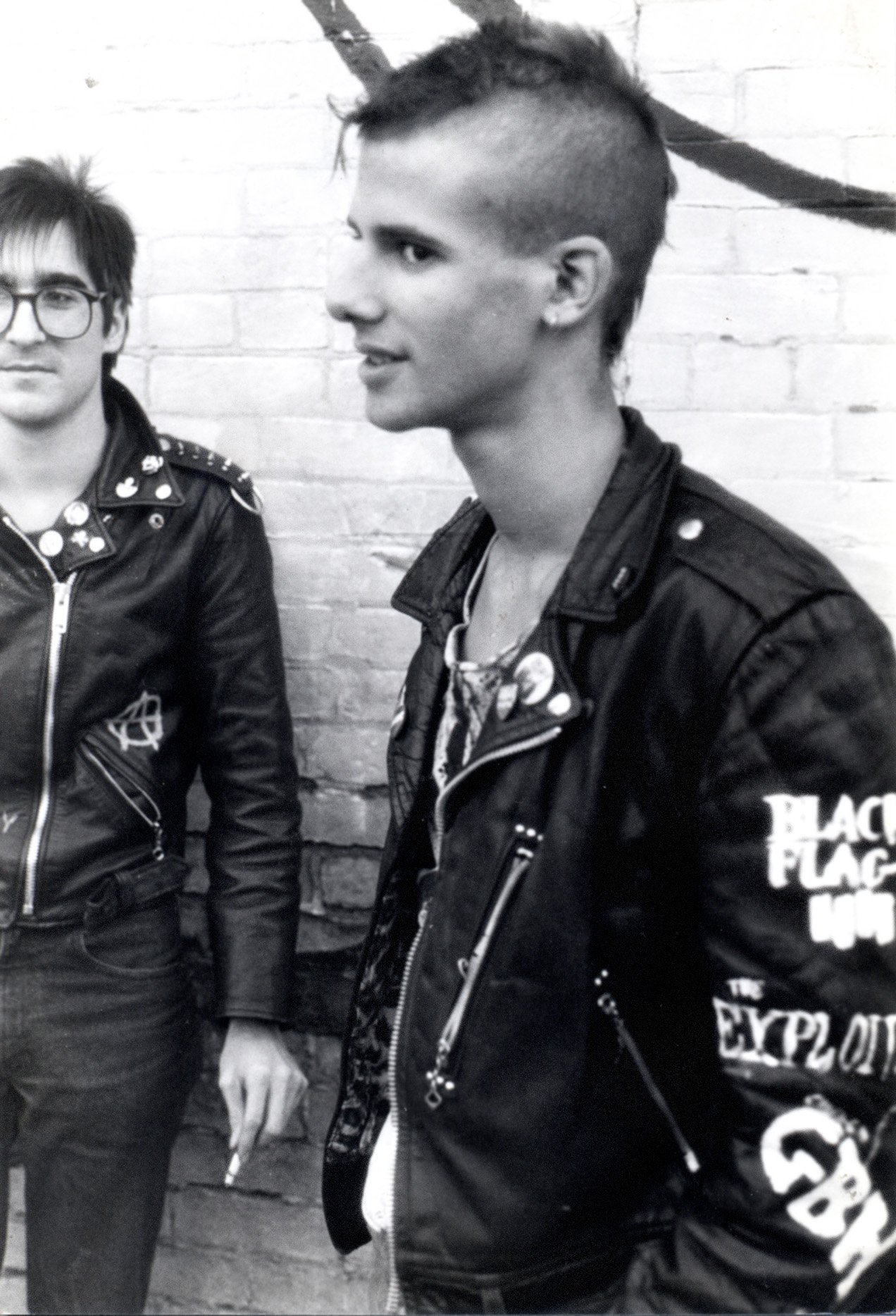
Punks in 1984

The punk subculture emerged in the mid-1970s; in New York in 1974 and in the United Kingdom in 1976. Some suggest the name "punk" was borrowed from prison slang. Early punk had an abundance of antecedents and influences, and Jon Savage describes the subculture as a "bricolage" of almost every previous youth culture in the Western world since World War II, "stuck together with safety pins".

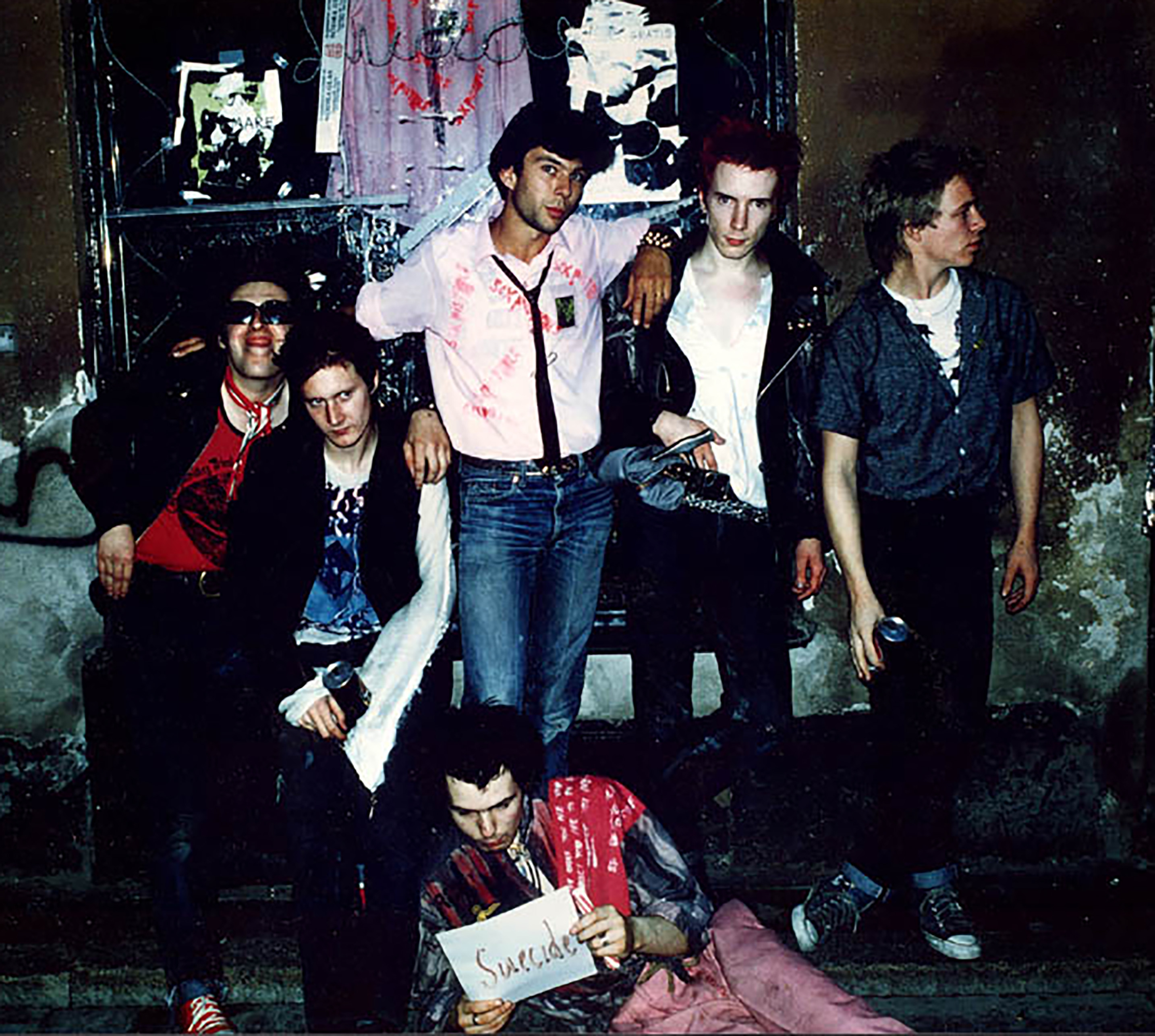
Thomas Dellert aka "Tommy Dollar", one of the early London punk rockers, standing with the Sex Pistols in 1975

In the late 1970s, the subculture began to diversify, which led to the proliferation of factions such as new wave, post-punk, 2 Tone, hardcore punk, no wave, street punk, and Oi!. Hardcore punk, street punk, and Oi! sought to do away with the frivolities introduced in the later years of the original punk movement. The punk subculture influenced other underground music scenes such as alternative rock, indie music, crossover thrash, and the extreme subgenres of heavy metal (mainly thrash metal, death metal, speed metal, and the NWOBHM).

== Music ==
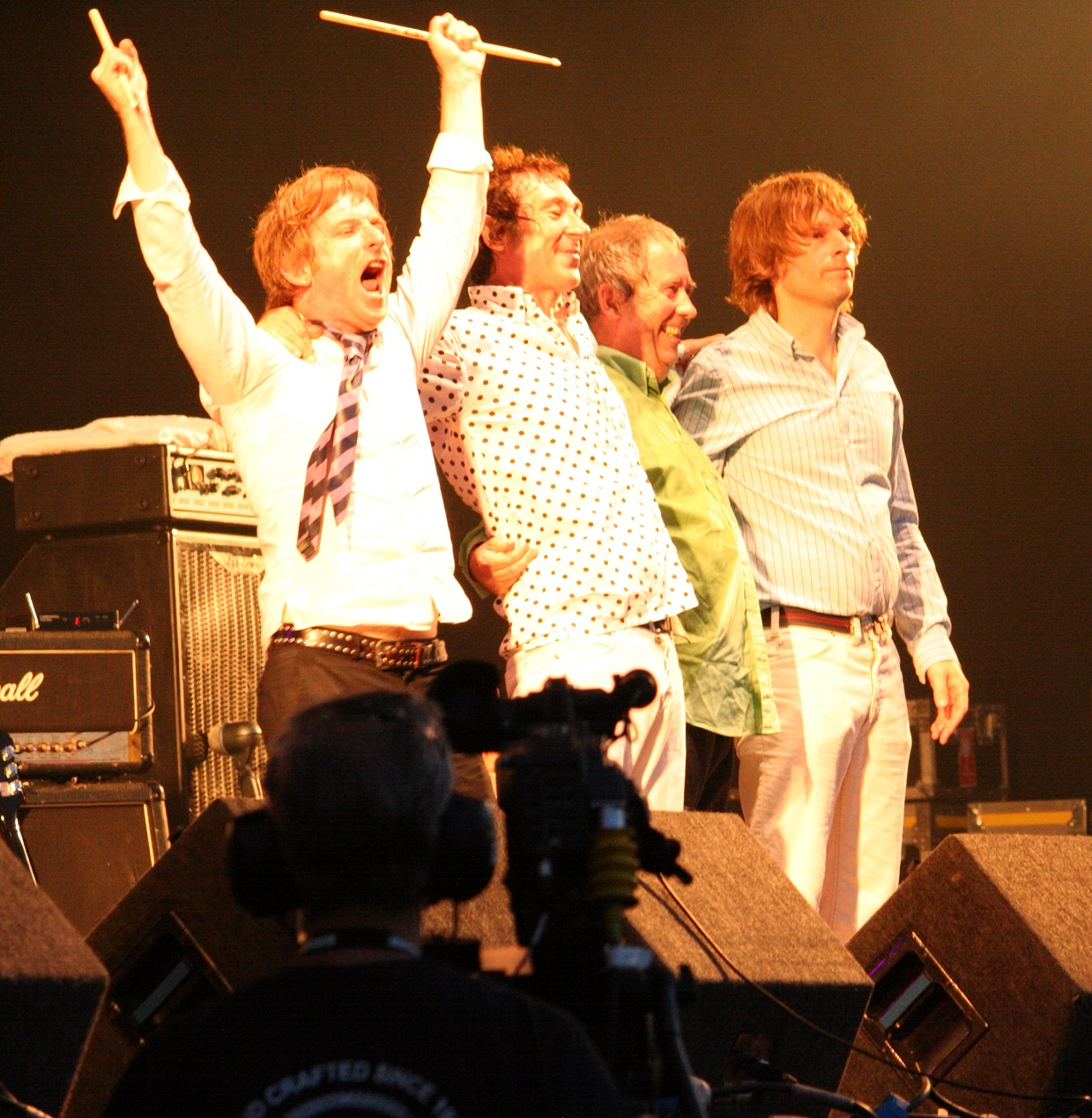
Buzzcocks at the Cropredy Festival in 2009

The punk subculture is centred on a loud, aggressive genre of rock music called punk rock, usually played by bands consisting of a vocalist, one or two electric guitarists, an electric bassist, and a drummer.

While most punk rock uses distorted guitars and noisy drumming sounds derived from 1960s garage rock and 1970s pub rock, some punk bands incorporate elements from other subgenres, such as surf rock, rockabilly, or reggae. Most punk rock songs are short, have simple and somewhat basic arrangements using relatively few chords, and typically have lyrics that express punk ideologies and values, although some punk lyrics are about lighter topics such as partying or romantic relationships.

Different punk subcultures often distinguish themselves by having a unique style of punk rock, although not every style of punk rock has its own associated subculture.

The earliest form of music to be called "punk rock" was 1960s garage rock, and the term was applied to the genre retroactively by influential rock critics in the early 1970s. In the late 1960s, music now referred to as protopunk originated as a garage rock revival in the northeastern United States. The first distinct music scene to claim the punk label appeared in New York City between 1974 and 1976. Around the same time or soon afterward, a punk scene developed in London. Los Angeles subsequently became home to the third major punk scene.

In the 1980s, punk went through an internal conflict over which the direction the music would go, the authenticity of the genre, and the commercial compromise from the bands. Some scholars described this period as an "identity crisis" where bands debated over what issues were truly essential to punk and how the music was meant to be played. Bands such as Hüsker Dü, 7 Seconds (band), Government Issue, and Dag Nasty played with a slower tempo and melody, drawing inspiration from jazz, classic rock, and more. Some fans viewed this change as necessary for the development of the genre while others said it was punk band changing for major record labels. This experimentation is what produced the sub-genres of punk such as pop-punk (like green day and blink 182), alternative rock, punk metal (rage against the machine and system of a down) and grunge.

The New York City punk rock scene arose from a subcultural underground promoted by artists, reporters, musicians, and a wide variety of non-mainstream enthusiasts. The Velvet Underground's harsh and experimental yet often melodic sound in the mid to late-1960s, much of it relating to transgressive media work by visual artist Andy Warhol, is credited for influencing 1970s bands such as the New York Dolls, the Stooges, and the Ramones.

== Ideologies ==
The punk subculture is often associated with a do-it-yourself (DIY) ethic; however, some critics suggest that the DIY image often placed on punk is partly a delayed interpretation rather than an accurate reflection of early punk. During the subculture's infancy, many members were from a working-class background and expressed dissatisfaction with the affluence that was associated with popular rock music at the time. In response, some punks published their own music or sign with small independent labels, in hopes to combat what they saw as a dominant commercial music industry. Although punk is now closely linked to DIY, British punk scenes rarely used the term "DIY" explicitly. Punk bands are often described as promoting anti-establishment stances. However, some scholars argue this was inconsistent in practice. In some cases, punk bands signed with major record labels after achieving success. Critics have also noted that punk bands advertised their music through mainstream outlets, such as BBC radio 1, and relied on factories to press their records. In spite of the criticism, the DIY ethic is still popular with punks.

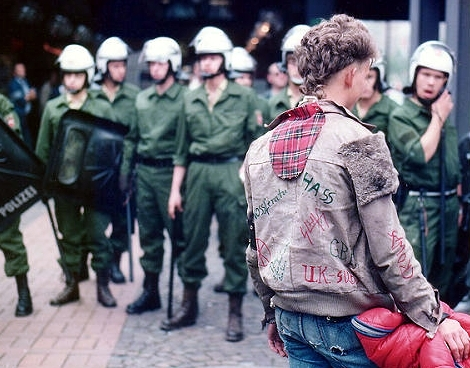
A punk faces a line of riot police at the 1984 Chaos Days

Punk political ideologies are mostly concerned with individual freedom and anti-establishment views. Common punk viewpoints include anti-capitalism, individual liberty, anti-authoritarianism, a DIY ethic, non-conformity, anti-corporatism, anti-government, direct action, and not selling out.

Some groups and individuals that try to self-identify as being a part of the punk subculture hold pro-Nazi or Fascist views. However, these Nazi/Fascist groups are rejected by almost all of the punk subculture. The belief that such views are opposed to the original ethos of the punk subculture, and its history, has led to internal conflicts and an active push against such views being considered part of punk subculture at all. Two examples of this are an incident during the 2016 American Music Awards, where the band Green Day chanted anti-racist and anti-fascist messages, and an incident at a show by the Dropkick Murphys, when bassist and singer Ken Casey tackled an individual for giving a Nazi-style salute and later stated that Nazis are not welcome at a Dropkick Murphys show. Band member Tim Brennan later reaffirmed this sentiment. The song "Nazi Punks Fuck Off" by hardcore punk band Dead Kennedys is a standout example.

Early British punks expressed nihilistic and anarchist views with the slogan No Future, which came from the Sex Pistols song "God Save the Queen". In the United States, punks had a different approach to nihilism which was less anarchistic than the British punks. Punk nihilism was expressed in the use of "harder, more self-destructive, consciousness-obliterating substances like heroin, or methamphetamine".

== Fashion ==
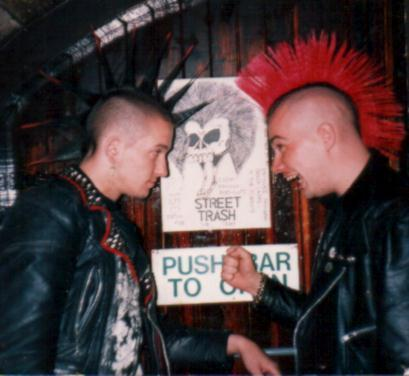
Two British punks in the early 1980s

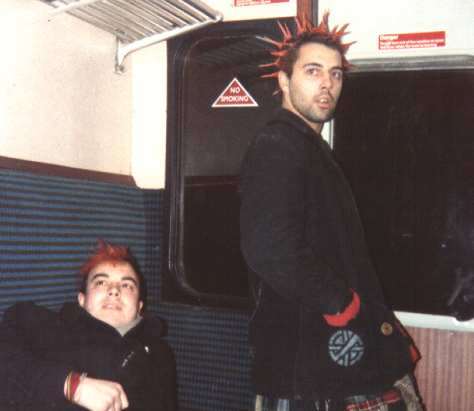
Punk fashion in 1986

Early punk fashion adapted everyday objects for aesthetic effect: ripped clothing was held together by safety pins or wrapped with tape; ordinary clothing was customised by embellishing it with marker or adorning it with paint; a black bin liner became a dress, shirt or skirt; safety pins and razor blades were used as jewellery. Also popular have been leather, rubber, and PVC clothing that is often associated with transgressive sexuality, like BDSM and S&M. A designer associated with early UK punk fashion was Vivienne Westwood, who made clothes for Malcolm McLaren's boutique in the King's Road, which became famous as "SEX".

Many punks wear tight "drainpipe" jeans, plaid/tartan trousers, kilts or skirts, T-shirts, leather jackets (often decorated with painted band logos, pins and buttons, and metal studs, chains or spikes), and footwear such as high-cut Chuck Taylors, trainers, skate shoes, brothel creepers, Dr. Martens boots, and army boots. Early punks occasionally wore clothes displaying a swastika for shock value; Vivienne Westwood's DESTROY shirt featured an upside-down crucified Jesus and a swastika, notably worn by members of the Sex Pistols. Most contemporary punks are staunchly anti-racist and are more likely to wear a crossed-out swastika symbol than a pro-Nazi symbol. Some punks cut their hair into mohawks or other dramatic shapes, style it to stand in spikes, and colour it with vibrant, unnatural hues.

Some punks are anti-fashion, arguing that punk should be defined by music or ideology. Punk clothing choices challenge the way in which individuals in a nation dress, and the ideals of a traditionalist nation. This is most common in the post-1980s US hardcore punk scene, where members of the subculture often dressed in plain T-shirts and jeans, rather than the more elaborate outfits and spiked, dyed hair of their British counterparts. Many groups adopt a look based on street clothes and working-class outfits. Hardcore punk fans adopted a dressed-down style of T-shirts, jeans, combat boots or trainers, and crewcuts. Women in the hardcore scene typically wore army trousers, band T-shirts, and hooded jumpers.

The style of the 1980s hardcore scene contrasted with the more provocative fashion styles of late 1970s punk rockers (elaborate hairdos, torn clothes, patches, safety pins, studs, spikes, etc.). Circle Jerks frontman Keith Morris described early hardcore fashion as "the...punk scene was basically based on English fashion. But we had nothing to do with that. Black Flag and the Circle Jerks were so far from that. We looked like the kid who worked at the gas station or submarine shop." Henry Rollins echoes Morris' point, stating that for him getting dressed up meant putting on a black shirt and some dark pants; Rollins viewed an interest in fashion as being a distraction. Jimmy Gestapo from Murphy's Law describes his own transition from dressing in a punk style (spiked hair and a bondage belt) to adopting a hardcore style (i.e. boots and a shaved head) as being based on a need for more functional clothing. A punk scholar states that "hardcore kids do not look like punks", since hardcore scene members wore basic clothing and short haircuts, in contrast to the "embellished leather jackets and pants" worn in the punk scene.

In contrast to Morris' and Rollins' views, another punk scholar claims that the standard hardcore punk clothing and styles included torn jeans, leather jackets, spiked armbands and dog collars, mohawk hairstyles, and DIY ornamentation of clothes with studs, painted band names, political statements, and patches. Yet another punk scholar describes the look that was common in the San Francisco hardcore scene as consisting of biker-style leather jackets, chains, studded wristbands, pierced noses and multiple piercings, painted or tattooed statements (e.g. an anarchy symbol), and hairstyles ranging from military-style haircuts dyed black or blonde to mohawks and shaved heads.

The Metropolitan Museum of Art in 2013 hosted a comprehensive exhibit, PUNK: Chaos to Couture, that examined the techniques of hardware, distress, and re-purposing in punk fashion.

== Gender and gender expression ==
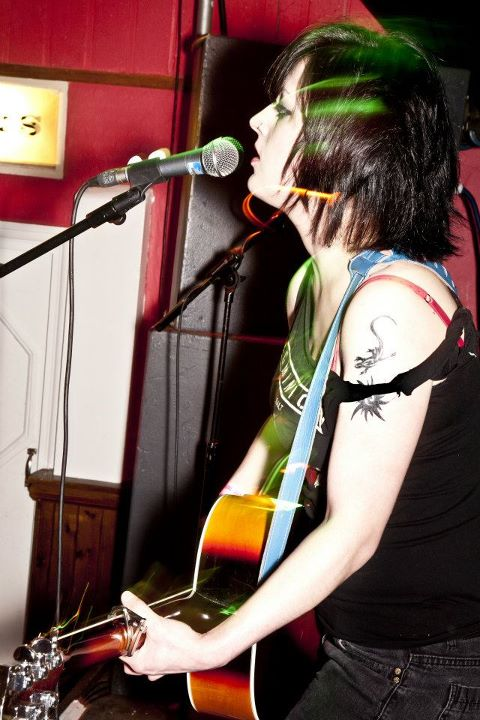
Louise Distras, advocate of crowdfunding, performing

In the United Kingdom, the advent of punk in the late 1970s with its "anyone can do it" ethos led to women making significant contributions. In contrast to the rock music and heavy metal scenes of the 1970s, which were dominated by men, the anarchic, counter-cultural mindset of the punk scene in mid- and late 1970s encouraged women to participate. "That was the beauty of the punk thing," Chrissie Hynde later said. "[Sexual] discrimination didn't exist in that scene." This participation played a role in the historical development of punk music, especially in the US and UK at that time, and continues to influence and enable future generations.

Rock historian Helen Reddington states that the popular image of young punk women musicians as focused on the fashion aspects of the scene (fishnet stockings, spiky blond hair, etc.) was stereotypical. She states that many, if not most women punks were more interested in the ideology and socio-political implications, rather than the fashion. Music historian Caroline Coon contends that before punk, women in rock music were virtually invisible; in contrast, in punk, she argues "[i]t would be possible to write the whole history of punk music without mentioning any male bands at all – and I think a lot of [people] would find that very surprising." Johnny Rotten wrote that 'During the Pistols era, women were out there playing with the men, taking us on in equal terms ... It wasn't combative, but compatible.'

Others take issue with the notion of equal recognition, such as guitarist Viv Albertine, who stated that "the A&R men, the bouncers, the sound mixers, no one took us seriously. So, no, we got no respect anywhere we went. People just didn't want us around." The anti-establishment stance of punk opened the space for women who were treated like outsiders in a male-dominated industry. Sonic Youth's Kim Gordon states, "I think women are natural anarchists, because you're always operating in a male framework."

=== Body and appearance ===
For some punks, the body was a symbol of opposition, a political statement expressing disgust of all that was "normal" and socially accepted. The idea was to make others outside of the subculture question their own views, which made gender presentation and gender identity a popular factor to be played with. In some ways, punk helped to tear apart the normalised view of gender as a dichotomy. There was a notable amount of cross-dressing in the punk scene; it was not unusual to see men wearing ripped-up skirts, fishnet tights, and excessive makeup, or to see women with shaved heads wearing oversized plaid shirts and jean jackets and heavy combat boots. Punk created a new cultural space for androgyny and all kinds of gender expression.

In trying to reject societal norms, punk embraced one societal norm by deciding that strength and anger was best expressed through masculinity, defining masculine as the "default", where gender did not exist or had no meaning. However, the main reasoning behind this argument equates femininity with popular conceptions of beauty. Everything that was normally supposed to be hidden was brought to the front, both literally and figuratively. This could mean anything from wearing bras and underwear on top of clothing to wearing nothing but a bra and underwear. Although that act can seem sexualised, to punks it was just a way of self-expression.

The nature of punk allowed many to create a non-gender-conforming style. Punks could be free to use femininity or masculinity to make what they were doing even more shocking to their audience. It became popular for some punks to accentuate societal norms. At the Reading Festival in 1992, Donita Sparks, lead singer of the band L7, removed her tampon and threw it into the audience.

=== Riot grrrl ===
Riot grrrl is an underground feminist hardcore punk movement that originated in the early 1990s in Washington, D.C., and the Pacific Northwest, especially Olympia, Washington. It is often associated with third-wave feminism, which is sometimes seen as its starting point. It has also been described as a musical genre that came out of indie rock, with the punk scene serving as an inspiration for a musical movement in which women could express themselves in the same way men had been doing for the past several years.

=== Queercore ===
Queercore is a punk movement that focuses on LGBT issues. Queercore is an anti-establishment subculture based around a rejection of heteronormativity. This rejection extends beyond mainstream society and resists homophobia in the larger punk scene. Queercore is an offshoot of the hardcore punk scene and draws its name from a combination of the words "queer" and "hardcore". As in the larger punk scene, DIY is an integral component of the queercore subculture. Many zines that came out of the riot grrrl movement explored issues of queer identity, contributing to the queercore subculture. The queercore and riot grrrl subcultures are often considered to be connected. These two punk scenes are intertwined, with many bands being both queercore and riot grrrl.

== Visual art ==
Punk aesthetics determine the type of art punks enjoy, usually with underground, minimalistic, iconoclastic, and satirical sensibilities. Punk artwork graces album covers, flyers for concerts, and punk zines. Usually straightforward with clear messages, punk art is often concerned with political issues such as social injustice and economic disparity. The use of images of suffering to shock and create feelings of empathy in the viewer is common.

== Dance ==
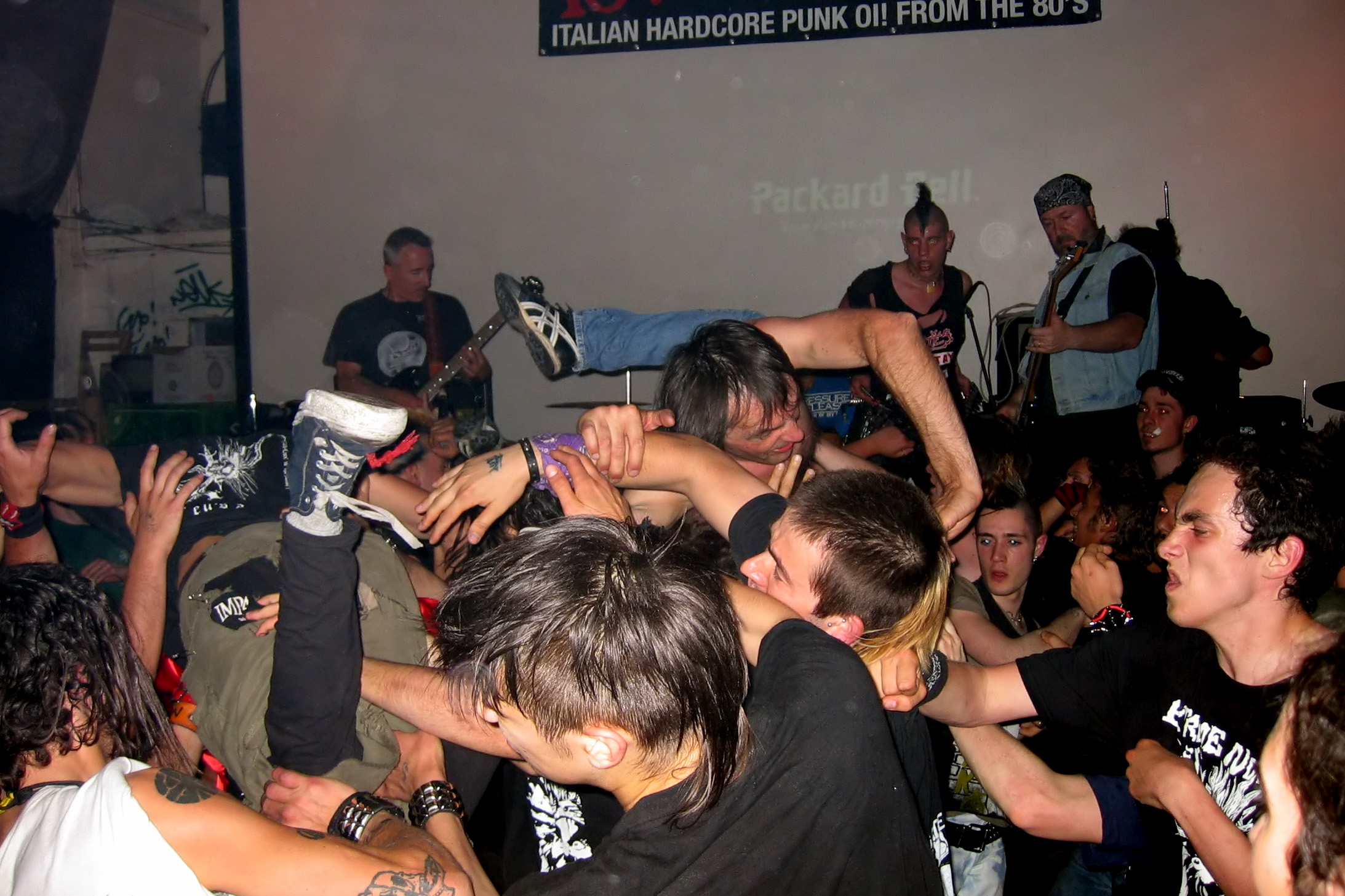
A crowd of fans at a punk show in Italy in 2006

Two dance styles associated with punk are pogo dancing and moshing. The pogo is a dance in which the dancers jump up and down, while either remaining on the spot or moving around; the dance takes its name from its resemblance to the use of a pogo stick, especially in a common version of the dance, where an individual keeps their torso stiff, their arms rigid, and their legs close together. Pogo dancing is closely associated with punk rock and is a precursor to moshing. Moshing or slamdancing is a style of dance where participants push or slam into each other, typically during a live music show. It is usually associated with "aggressive" music genres, such as hardcore punk and thrash metal. Stage diving and crowd surfing were originally associated with protopunk bands such as The Stooges, and have appeared at punk, metal, and rock concerts. Ska punk promoted an updated version of skanking. Hardcore dancing is a later development influenced by all of the above-mentioned styles. Psychobillies prefer to "wreck", a form of slam dancing that involves people punching each other in the chest and arms as they move around the circle pit.

== Literature ==
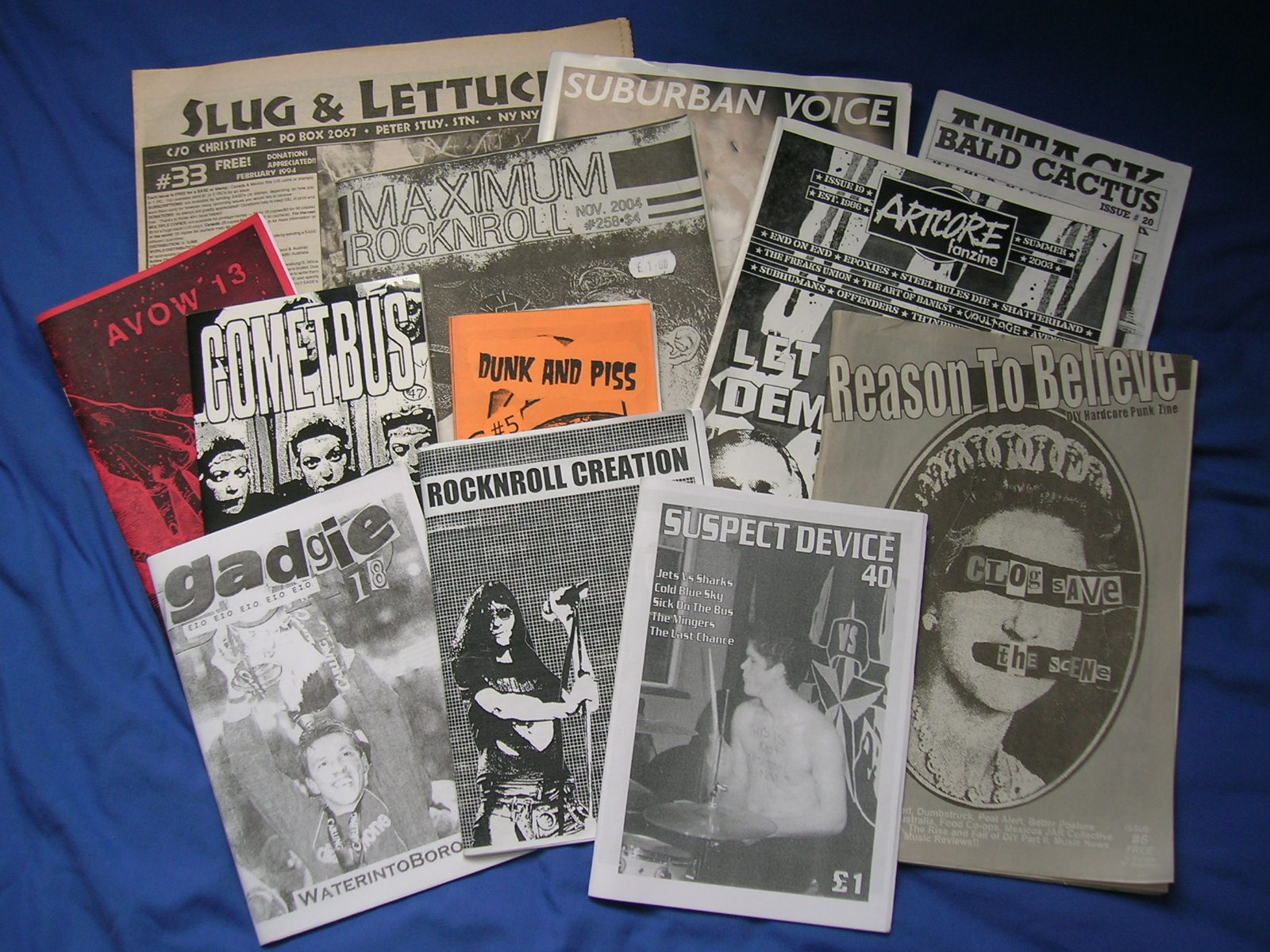
UK and US zines, 1994–2004

Punk has generated a considerable amount of poetry and prose. Punk has its own underground press in the form of punk zines, which feature news, gossip, cultural criticism, and interviews. Some zines take the form of perzines. Important punk zines include Maximum RocknRoll, Punk Planet, No Cure, Cometbus, Flipside, and Search & Destroy. Several novels, biographies, autobiographies, and comic books have been written about punk.

Just as zines played an important role in spreading information in the punk era (e.g. British fanzines like Mark Perry's Sniffin Glue and Shane MacGowan's Bondage), zines also played an important role in the hardcore scene. In the pre-Internet era, zines enabled readers to learn about bands, shows, clubs, and record labels. Zines typically included reviews of shows and records, interviews with bands, letters to the editor, and advertisements for records and labels. Zines were DIY products, "proudly amateur, usually handmade, and always independent", and during the "'90s, zines were the primary way to stay up on punk and hardcore." They were the "blogs, comment sections, and social networks of their day."

In the American Midwest, the zine Touch and Go described the regional hardcore scene from 1979 to 1983. We Got Power described the LA scene from 1981 to 1984, and included show reviews of and interviews with such bands as Vancouver's D.O.A., the Misfits, Black Flag, Suicidal Tendencies, and the Circle Jerks. My Rules was a photo zine that included photos of hardcore shows from across the US. In Effect, which began in 1988, described the New York City scene.

Punk poets include: Richard Hell, Jim Carroll, Patti Smith, John Cooper Clarke, Seething Wells, Raegan Butcher, and Attila the Stockbroker. The Medway Poets performance group included punk musician Billy Childish and had an influence on Tracey Emin. Jim Carroll's autobiographical works are among the first known examples of punk literature. The punk subculture has inspired the cyberpunk and steampunk literature genres, and has even contributed (through Iggy Pop) to classical scholarship.

== Film ==
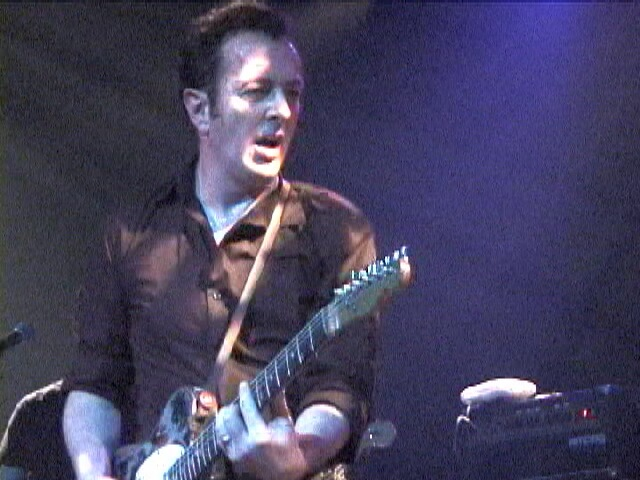
Joe Strummer concert footage from the movie, TV, and radio service Punkcast

Many punk-themed films have been made. The No Wave Cinema and Remodernist film movements owe much to punk aesthetics. Several famous punk bands have participated in movies, such as the Ramones in Rock 'n' Roll High School, the Sex Pistols in The Great Rock 'n' Roll Swindle, and Social Distortion in Another State of Mind. Derek Jarman and Don Letts are notable punk filmmakers. Penelope Spheeris' first instalment of the documentary trilogy "The Decline of Western Civilization" (1981) focuses on the early Los Angeles punk scene through interviews and early concert footage from bands including Black Flag, Circle Jerks, Germs, and Fear. The Decline of Western Civilization III" explores the gutter punk lifestyle in the 1990s. Loren Cass is another example of the punk subculture represented in film.

The Japanese cyberpunk movement has roots in the J-rock subculture that arose in the 1970s. The filmmaker Sogo Ishii introduced this subculture to Japanese cinema with his punk films Panic High School (1978) and Crazy Thunder Road (1980), which portrayed the rebellion and anarchy associated with punk, and went on to become highly influential in underground film circles. Crazy Thunder Road in particular was an influential biker film, with a punk biker gang aesthetic that paved the way for Katsuhiro Otomo's manga and anime franchise Akira (1982 debut). Ishii's next film was the frenetic Shuffle (1981), an unofficial short film adaptation of a manga comic strip by Otomo.

The documentary film Afro-Punk covers the black experience in the punk DIY scene.

== Perspectives on drugs and alcohol ==
=== Inhalable solvents ===
The "cheap high" of glue sniffing was adopted by punks, encouraged by the disgusted and shocked reactions they received from society. Model aeroplane glue and contact cement were among the numerous solvents and inhalants used by punks to achieve euphoria and intoxication. Glue was typically inhaled by placing a quantity in a plastic bag and "huffing" (inhaling) the vapour. Liquid solvents were typically inhaled by soaking a rag with the solvent and inhaling the vapour. While users inhale solvents for the intoxicating effects, the practice can be harmful or fatal.

The Ramones sing about the practice in their 1976 song, "Now I Wanna Sniff Some Glue".

=== Straight edge ===
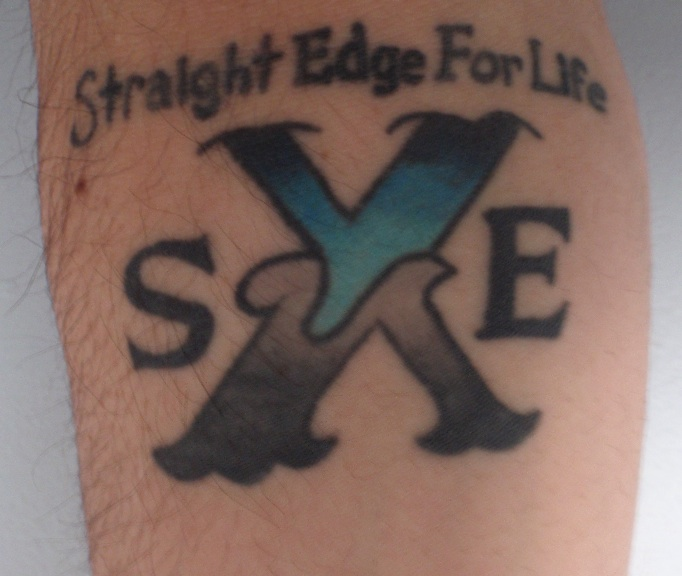
A straight edge tattoo

Straight edge is a philosophy of hardcore punk culture, adherents of which refrain from using alcohol, tobacco, and other recreational drugs, in reaction to the excesses of punk subculture. For some, this extends to refraining from engaging in promiscuous sex, following a vegetarian or vegan diet, and not drinking coffee or taking prescribed medicine. The term straight edge was adopted from the 1981 song "Straight Edge" by the hardcore punk band Minor Threat.

Straight edge emerged amid the early-1980s hardcore punk scene. Since then, a wide variety of beliefs and ideas have been associated with the movement, including vegetarianism and animal rights. Ross Haenfler writes that as of the late 1990s, approximately three out of four straight edge participants were vegetarian or vegan. While the commonly expressed aspects of the straight edge subculture have been abstinence from alcohol, nicotine, and illegal drugs, there have been considerable variations on how far to take the interpretations of "abstaining from intoxicants" or "living drug-free". Disagreements often arise as to the primary reasons for living straight edge. Straight edge politics are primarily left-wing and revolutionary but there have been conservative offshoots.

In 1999, William Tsitsos wrote that straight edge had gone through three eras since its founding in the early 1980s. Bent edge began as a counter-movement to straight edge by members of the Washington, D.C. hardcore scene who were frustrated by the rigidity and intolerance in the scene. During the youth crew era, which started in the mid-1980s, the influence of music on the straight edge scene was at an all-time high. By the early 1990s, militant straight edge was a well-known part of the wider punk scene. In the early to mid-1990s, straight edge spread from the United States to Northern Europe, Eastern Europe, the Middle East, and South America. By the beginning of the 2000s, militant straight edge punks had largely left the broader straight edge culture and movement.

== Lifestyle and community ==
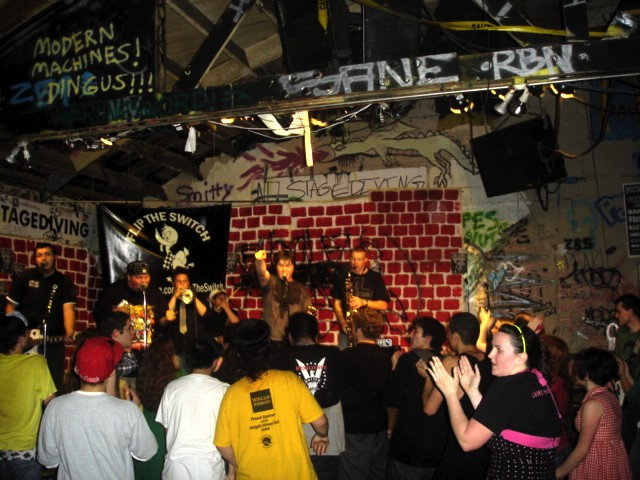
A band plays on the tiny stage at the Berkeley, California punk venue at 924 Gilman Street

Punks come from all culture and economic classes. Compared to some subcultures, punk ideology is much closer to gender equality. Although the punk subculture is mostly anti-racist, it is overwhelmingly white. However, members of other groups (such as African Americans, other black people, Latinos, and Asians) have contributed to the development of the subculture. Substance abuse has sometimes been a part of the punk scene, with the notable exception of the straight edge movement. Violence has also sometimes appeared in the punk subculture, but has been opposed by some subsets of the subculture, such as the pacifist strain anarcho-punk.

Punks often form a local scene, which can have as few as half a dozen members in a small town, or as many as thousands of in a major city. A local scene usually has a small group of dedicated punks surrounded by a more casual periphery. A typical punk scene is made up of punk and hardcore bands, fans who attend concerts, protests, and other events, zine publishers, reviewers, and other writers, visual artists illustrating zines, and creating posters and album covers, show promoters, and people who work at music venues or independent record labels. Punk communities also include older fans who have expanded punk into a lifestyle during adulthood. Research on older punk fans shows that involvement often persists into adulthood through small-venue shows, festivals, and local social scenes, acting almost as overseers of the genre. While the older fans stand to the side while younger fans mosh, they interact by sharing knowledge about punk and continuing the culture into adulthood. Although the visual indications of punk usually become less important to fans as they get older, punk turns into an ideology that shapes their world view.

Squatting plays a role in many punk communities, providing shelter and other forms of support. Squats in abandoned or condemned housing, and communal "punk houses" often provide bands a place to stay while they are touring. Punk houses are often centred on certain political or personal ideologies. It is not uncommon for a punk house to be anarchist, strictly straight-edge, or vegan. Punk houses serve as backdrops for local scenes; punk houses often provide overnight shelter to touring punk rock bands, and sometimes serve as a venue for shows. Bands or record labels sometimes form in a particular punk house. Many punk houses have associated punk zines that sometimes share the name of the house. There are some punk communes, such as Essex's Dial House.

The Internet has been playing an increasingly large role in punk, specifically in the form of virtual communities and file sharing programs for trading music files.

=== Authenticity ===
In the punk and hardcore subcultures, members of the scene are often evaluated in terms of the authenticity of their commitment to the values or philosophies of the scene, which may range from political beliefs to lifestyle practices. In the punk subculture, the epithet poseur (or "poser") is used to describe "a person who habitually pretends to be something [they are] not." The term is used to refer to a person who adopts the dress, speech, or mannerisms of a particular subculture, yet who is deemed to not share or understand the values or philosophy of the subculture.

Never one to shy away from criticising the music industry and even punk culture, in Chickenshit Conformist Dead Kennedys opined that "Punk's not dead It just deserves to die When it becomes another stale cartoon...Ideas don't matter, it's who you know.", saying punk was in danger of becoming a "meaningless fad" because people had stopped caring about what they saw as the core values of punk ("Change and caring are what's real"). In particular, metal bands, which were seen as an offshoot, they saw as not only as a sell-out, but as morally repugnant to the core values of punk saying labels were making money by signing "the most racist queerbashing bands they can find."

While this perceived inauthenticity is viewed with scorn and contempt by members of the subculture, the definition of the term and to whom it should be applied is subjective. An article in Drowned in Sound argues that 1980s-era "hardcore is the true spirit of punk", because "after all the poseurs and fashionistas fucked off to the next trend of skinny pink ties with New Romantic haircuts, singing wimpy lyrics", the punk scene consisted only of people "completely dedicated to the DIY ethics".

Proto-punk bands such as the Who, the Stooges, the Velvet Underground, Pink Fairies, the Deviants, and Edgar Broughton Band came out of garage-rock during the late 1960s. Usually, white working-class boys are credited for pioneering the genre, however, there were many women (Patti Smith, Siouxsie Sioux) and people of colour (the Specials member) who contributed to the original punk sound and aesthetic. Because the original subculture meant to challenge to the mainstream, and punk movement became major it was brought to the mainstream. If punk is commercialised, it is far from street culture.

Punk Girls written by Liz Ham is a photo-book featuring 100 portraits of Australian women in the punk subculture, and it was published in 2017 by Manuscript Daily. Discrimination against punk subculture is explored with her photographs in the book; these girls who are not mainstream, but "beautiful and talented".

== Interactions with other subcultures ==
Some of the first hip hop MCs called themselves punk rockers, and some punk fashions have found their way into hip hop dress and vice versa. Malcolm McLaren played roles in introducing both punk and hip hop to the United Kingdom. Hip hop later influenced some punk and hardcore bands, such as the Beastie Boys, Hed PE, Blaggers I.T.A., Biohazard, E.Town Concrete, The Transplants, and Refused. Other rappers and hip-hop acts were influenced by the subcultures of crust punk and hardcore such as City Morgue.

The skinhead subculture of the United Kingdom in the late 1960s – which had almost disappeared in the early 1970s – was revived in the late 1970s, partly because of the influence of punk rock, especially the Oi! punk subgenre. Conversely, ska and reggae, popular among traditionalist skinheads, has influenced several punk musicians. Punks and skinheads have had both antagonistic and friendly relationships, depending on the social circumstances, time period, and geographic location.

The punk and heavy metal subcultures have shared some similarities since punk's inception. The early 1970s protopunk scene had an influence on the development of heavy metal. Alice Cooper was a forerunner of the fashion and music of both the punk and metal subcultures. Motörhead, since their first album release in 1977, have enjoyed continued popularity in the punk scene, and their now-deceased frontman Lemmy was a fan of punk rock. Genres such as metalcore, grindcore, crossover thrash, riot grrl, and emo were greatly influenced by punk rock and heavy metal. Hardcore emerged as a response to the supposed commercialisation of early punk music. Most hardcore music was produced independently to reject the mainstream music industry. The emergence of hardcore resulted in the fused creation of many genres, such as metalcore, grindcore, and crossover thrash. Emo was inspired by punk, but added more emotional and lyrical themes. It is not considered to be as musically heavy as its punk predecessor. The new wave of British heavy metal influenced the UK 82-style of bands like Discharge, and hardcore was a primary influence on thrash metal bands such as Metallica and Slayer. The early 1990s grunge subculture was a fusion of punk anti-fashion ideals and metal-influenced guitar sounds. However, hardcore punk and grunge developed in part as reactions against the heavy metal music that was popular during the 1980s.

In the late 1970s, punks were known to have had confrontations with hippies due to the contrasting ideologies and backlash of the hippie culture. Nevertheless, Penny Rimbaud of the English anarcho-punk band Crass said that Crass was formed in memory of his friend, the hippie Wally Hope. Rimbaud also said that Crass were heavily involved with the hippie movement throughout the 1960s and 1970s, with Dial House being established in 1967. Many punks were often critical of Crass for their involvement in the hippie movement. Like Crass, Jello Biafra was influenced by the hippie movement and cited the yippies as a key influence on his political activism and thinking, though he did write songs critical of hippies.

Power pop music (as defined by groups such as Badfinger, Cheap Trick, The Knack, and The Romantics) emerged in mostly the same time frame and geographical area as punk rock, and they shared a great deal musically in terms of playing short songs loud and fast while trying to emphasise catchy feelings. More melodic and pop-influenced punk music has also often been wrapped alongside power pop bands under the general "new wave music" label. A good example of a genre-straddling "power pop punk" band is the popular Northern Ireland group Protex.

== Persecution ==
=== East Germany ===
The punk scene began to emerge in communist East Germany in the late 1970s. It shared many similarities with that of the West and was considered by the ruling authorities to be a spread of an international youth sub-culture which had its roots in the US and Western Europe. Indeed, this was an assessment many East German punks shared themselves. According to one, Mario Schulz, "The start was that I liked the music. I did not quite understand the English texts, but this ostentatious experience as an outsider, this capacity to shock, that pleased me. I was already – someone else would probably express it differently – an awkward sod."

By the authorities, punk was seen as representing a way of life which was contrary in nature to existing social conventions and values. Punks were, however, not the only youth sub-culture to be considered 'negative decadent' and a threat to the stability of communist society: heavy metallers, skinheads, and goths were also targeted. While it is hard to ascertain an exact figure, the punk scene in East Germany in the early 1980s was still relatively small. For example, 'In 1981, the Stasi (secret police) identified 1,000 punks and a broader group of 10,000 sympathisers.' Punks, whether considered as individuals or as groups, were persecuted by both the regular police and the Stasi. More overt methods of persecution by the regular police – such as enforced haircutting, arrest, and physical beatings – were combined unofficially with the more insidious and far-reaching decomposition methods (trans. Zersetzung) of the Stasi: these involved various forms of infiltration, false flag type acts, framing, psychological harassment methods designed to cause mental health problems, and incarceration on the basis of mental health legislation or on the basis of crimes ostensibly committed.

As the methods of the Stasi were difficult to detect and even harder to prove, it allowed them to circumvent international condemnation in regard to the persecution of their own citizens. Aside from being designed to harm people, the methods were also designed to discredit and isolate individuals and break up the various bands and groupings. They relied heavily on the hiring of collaborators who were of a similar disposition to those who were being targeted. According to Stasi officers, this was a task which was harder to achieve with punks due to their 'feeling of belonging together.' Nonetheless, the Stasi did have notable success in the repression and decomposition of the punk scene. Former member of the band Namenlos, Jana Schlosser, stated in 1984 when she came out of jail, that "The Stasi had pretty well managed to smash punk."

== Global perspectives ==
The punk subculture has spread to many countries around the world. The fluidity of musical expression in particular makes it an ideal medium for this cross-cultural interpretation.

=== Mexico ===
In Mexico, punk culture is primarily a phenomenon among the upper-middle class, many of whom were first exposed to punk music through travel to England, but rapidly shifted to the lower-class youth. Because of low fees at public universities in Mexico, a significant majority of Mexican punks are university students. It is estimated approximately 5,000 young people are active punks in Mexico City, hosting two or three underground shows a week. These young people often form chavos banda — youth gangs — that organise subculture activity by creating formal meeting spaces and rituals and practices.

Oral nicknames are a distinguishing feature of Mexican punk, where the tradition of oral culture has influenced the development of nicknames for almost all Mexican punks. Patches are widely used as an inexpensive way to alter clothing and express identity. Though English-language bands like the Dead Kennedys are well known in Mexico, punks there prefer Spanish-language music or covers translated into Spanish. The slam dance style common in the California punk scene of the early 1980s is thoroughly adopted as part of the movement and continues to be the most popular dancing style among punks.

Performance and ideology practices often reflect the socioeconomic circumstances of Mexican punks. Live shows, called "tocadas", are generally held in public spaces like basketball courts or community centres instead of places of business like venues, bars, and restaurants, as is more common in the United States and Europe. They usually take place in the afternoon and end early to accommodate the two or three hours it takes many punks to return home by public transit. Mexican punk groups rarely release vinyl or CD recordings, usually cassettes are the preferred format.

Though Mexican punk itself does not have an explicit political agenda, Mexican punks have been active in the Zapatista, Anarcho-punk, and anti-globalisation movements.

=== South Africa ===
Punk arrived slowly in South Africa during the 1970s when waves of British tradesmen welcomed by the then-apartheid government brought cultural influences like the popular British music magazine NME, sold in South Africa six weeks after publication.

South African punk developed separately in Johannesburg, Durban, and Cape Town and relied on live performances in townships and streets as the multi-racial composition of bands and fan bases challenged the legal and social conventions of the apartheid regime.

Political participation is foundational to punk subculture in South Africa. During the apartheid regime, punk was second only to rock music in its importance to multi-racial interactions in South Africa. Because of this, any involvement in the punk scene was in itself a political statement. Police harassment was common and the government often censored explicitly political lyrics. Johannesburg-based band National Wake was routinely censored and even banned for songs like "International News", which challenged the South African government's refusal to acknowledge the racial and political conflict in the country. National Wake guitarist Ivan Kadey attributes the punk scene's ability to persevere despite the legal challenges of multi-racial mixing to punk subculture's DIY ethic and anti-establishment attitude.

In post-apartheid South Africa, punk attracted a greater number of white middle-class males than the more diverse makeup of the subculture during the apartheid era. Thabo Mbeki's African Renaissance movement has complicated the position of white South Africans in contemporary society. Punk provides young white men the opportunity to explore and express their minority identity. Cape Town band Hog Hoggidy Hog sings of the strange status of white Africans:

It's my home it's where I'll stay and where I belong,
I didn't choose to be here I was born I might seem out of place
but everything I hold dear is under the African sun.

Post-apartheid punk subculture continues to be active in South African politics, organising a 2000 festival called Punks Against Racism at Thrashers Statepark in Pretoria. Rather than the sense of despondency and fatalism that characterised 1970s British punk subculture, the politically engaged South African scene is more positive about the future of South Africa.

=== Peru ===
In Peru punk traces its roots to the band Los Saicos, a Lima group that played the unique blend of garage and break dance music that would later be labelled punk as early as the 1960s. The early activity of Los Saicos has led many to claim that punk originated in Lima instead of the UK, as is typically assumed. Though their claim to be the first punk band in the world can be disputed, Los Saicos were undoubtedly the first in Latin America and released their first single in 1965. The group played to full houses and made frequent television appearances throughout the 1960s. Throughout the 1970s, the band was completely forgotten. Years later, a plaque that declares "here the global punk-rock movement was born" was placed at the corner of Miguel Iglesias and Julio C. Tello Streets in Lima.

By the 1980s the punk scene in Peru was highly active. Peruvian punks call themselves subtes and appropriate the subversive implications of the English term "underground" through the Spanish term subterraneo (literally, subterranean). In the 1980s and 1990s subtes made almost exclusive use of cassette recording as a means of circulating music without participating in formal intellectual property and musical production industries. The current scene relies on digital distribution and assumes similar anti-establishment practices.

=== Cuba ===
A punk subculture originated in Cuba in the 1980s, referred to as Los Frikis. As Cuban radio stations rarely played rock music, Frikis often listened to music by picking up radio frequencies from stations in nearby Florida. While many Frikas in the early-1990s entered AIDS clinics by knowingly injecting HIV-positive blood into them, others began congregating at El patio de María, a community centre in Havana that was one of the few venues in the city that allowed rock bands to play. Some Frikis also participate in squatting as an act of political defiance.

In its beginning, the subculture was seen as a threat to the collectivism of Cuban society, leading to Frikis becoming victims of discrimination and police brutality. According to the New Times Broward-Palm Beach some Frikis were "rejected by family and often jailed or fined by the government", the 1980s Friki woman Yoandra Cardoso, however, has that argued that much of the response was verbal harassment from law enforcement. Dionisio Arce, lead vocalist of Cuban heavy metal band Zeus spent six years in prison due to his part in the Frikis. Some schools would forcibly shave the heads of young Frikis as a form of punishment.

=== Indonesia ===
Indonesia has had a considerable punk scene since at least the early 1990s, who protested against Suharto. Many of them stand against conservative government policies and culture, although there also exist some Indonesians who considered themselves "Islamic punks" and were more conservative. Punks have faced pushback from the police, such as when officers forcibly shaved the heads of people at a punk concert in Aceh.

== See also ==
- Art punk
- Hardcore punk
- History of subcultures in the 20th century
- List of hardcore punk subgenres
- List of punk bands
- List of subcultures
- Punk fashion
- Punk rock subgenres
- Punk rock
- Queercore
- Rivethead
- Solarpunk
- Timeline of punk rock

== Bibliography ==
- Andersen, Mark; Jenkins, Mark (2003). Dance of Days: Two Decades of Punk in the Nation's Capital. Akashic Books. ISBN 1-888451-44-0.
- Cogan, Brian (2008). The Encyclopedia of Punk. New York: Sterling. ISBN 978-1-4027-5960-4.
- Dennis, Mike; LaPorte, Norman (2011). State and Minorities in Communist East Germany. Berghahn Books. ISBN 978-0-857-45-195-8.
- Haenfler, Ross (August 2004). "Rethinking Subcultural Resistance". Journal of Contemporary Ethnography. 33 (4). Sage: 406–436. doi:10.1177/0891241603259809. S2CID 145602862.
- Haenfler, Ross (2006). Straight Edge: Hardcore Punk, Clean Living Youth, and Social Change. Rutgers University Press. ISBN 0-8135-3851-3.
- Kuhn, Gabriel (2010). Sober Living for the Revolution: Hardcore Punk, Straight Edge, and Radical Politics. PM Press. ISBN 978-1-60486-051-1.
- LeBlanc, Lauraine (1999). Pretty in Punk: Girls' Gender Resistance in a Boys' Subculture. New Brunswick, New Jersey: Rutgers University Press. ISBN 978-0-8135-2651-5.
- Tsitsos, William (October 1999). "Rules of rebellion: slamdancing, moshing, and the American alternative scene". Popular Music. 18 (3): 397–414. doi:10.1017/S0261143000008941. S2CID 159966036.
- Wood, Robert T. (1999). "Nailed to the X: A Lyrical History of Straightedge". Journal of Youth Studies. 2 (2): 133–151. doi:10.1080/13676261.1999.10593032.
