= List of skinhead films =

This is a list of notable fictional and documentary films featuring the skinhead subculture.

- 16 Years of Alcohol (2003) – Richard Jobson
- Adam's Apples (2005) – Anders Thomas Jensen
- Alpha Dog (2006) – Nick Cassavetes
- American History X (1998) – Tony Kaye
- Arena: Tell Us the Truth, Sham 69 (1979) – Jeff Perks and BBC TV
- Combat Girls (Kriegerin) (2011) – David Wnendt
- Diary of Skin (2005) – Jacobo Rispa
- Dog Years (1997) – Robert Loomis
- Farming (2018) - Adewale Akinnuoye-Agbaje
- Felon (2008) – Ric Roman Waugh
- French Blood (2015) - Diastéme
- Green Room (2015) – Jeremy Saulnier
- Higher Learning (1995) – John Singleton
- I – Proud to Be an Indian (2004) - Puneet Sira
- Imperium (2016)
- Kahlschlag (1993) – Hanno Brühl
- La guerra degli Antò (1999) – Riccardo Milani
- Luna Park (1992) – Pavel Lungin
- Made In Britain (1982) – Alan Clarke
- Meantime (1983) – Mike Leigh
- My Dog Killer (2013) – Mira Fornay
- Neo Ned (2005) – Van Fischer
- Oi! For England (1982) – Tony Smith
- Oi! Warning (2000) – Benjamin and Dominik Reding
- Pariah (1998) – Randolph Kret
- Romper Stomper (1992) – Geoffrey Wright
- Rough Cut and Ready Dubbed (1982) – Don Shaw
- Russia 88 (2009) – Pavel Bardin
- Skin (1995) - Vincent O'Connell
- Skin (2008) – Hanro Smitsman
- Skin (2018) – Guy Nattiv
- Skin Gang (1999) – Bruce LaBruce
- Skinhead Attitude (2003) – Daniel Schweizer
- Skinheads (1989) – Greydon Clark
- Skinheads USA: Soldiers of the Race War (1993) – Shari Cookson
- Skinning (2010) – Stefan Filipović
- Speak Up! It's So Dark (1993) – Suzanne Osten
- Steel Toes (2006) – David Gow and Mark Adam
- Suburbia (film) (1983) – Penelope Spheeris
- Teste rasate (1993) – Claudio Fragasso
- The Believer (2001) – Mark Jacobson
- The Infiltrator (1995) – John MacKenzie
- The Story of Skinhead (2016) – Don Letts (BBC documentary)
- This Is England (2006) – Shane Meadows
- World of Skinhead (1996) – Doug Aubrey and Channel 4
- Young Soul Rebels (1991) - Isaac Julien

== See also ==
- List of punk films
