= Twisted Issues =

1988 film

- Blu-ray cover
- Directed by: Charles Pinion
- Written by: Steve Antczak and James C. Bassett
- Starring: Stephen L. Antczak and Charles Pinion
- Distributed by: Inferential Pictures
- Release date: 1988
- Running time: 84 minutes

Twisted Issues is a 1988 splatter film directed by Charles Pinion and billed as a 'psycho-punk splatter-comedy'. It featured Gainesville, Florida punk bands such as Psychic Violents, Young Pioneers, Mutley Chix, Doldrums, Just Demigods, Cindy Brady's Lisp, Officer Friendly, and the Smegmas, as well as local speed metal band Hellwitch and avantgarde incidental music by The Bill Perry Orchestra.

Twisted Issues has been release multiple times on home media. Including a VHS version made by The Video Pharmacy in 2013, and a Blu-ray version made by Saturn’s Core Audio & Video and distributed by Vinegar Syndrome in 2025. The reception for Twisted Issues has been positive, with it being covered in multiple books about underground punk films.

== Synopsis ==
Twisted Issues follows a murdered punk that is resurrected by a mad scientist, nails his skateboard to his foot and heads out on a killing spree.

== Production ==
Twisted Issues was originally intended to be a punk rockumentary about bands in Gainesville, but It ended up as an anthology with segments being written by different people, including Chuck Speta, Jennifer Canal and Andrew Entner. The special effects where done by David Peck. The inclusion of writers Steve Antczak and Hawk (James C. Bassett) to the mix added the horror, element to the story, featuring a so-called Death Skater who kills characters played by members of the aforementioned bands after they inadvertently kill him. The director, Charles Pinion went on to make several other underground movies. Including: Red Spirit Lake (1993), We Await (1996) and American Mummy (2014).

== Releases ==
The VHS version of Twisted Issues has been long unavailable. A limited edition DVD (313 copies made) of Twisted Issues is sold from the filmmaker's website. In 2013, Don Abendroth of The Video Pharmacy released a limited edition (25 copies) of Twisted Issues on VHS. It includes a tiny blood spattered skateboard and TV set, as well as the soundtrack on cassette, and a new printing of the original booklet. In 2025 a Blu-ray release was made with Vinegar Syndrome.

== Reception and legacy ==
Film Threat Video Guide called Twisted Issues one of the 25 Must-See Underground Movies of the 1980s. In 2011, the book Destroy All Movies, had a section on Twisted Issues and its director, Charles Pinion. In 2013, the book Bleeding Skull!: A 1980s Trash-Horror Odyssey, covered Twisted Issues and other shot-on-video films. Dazed called it technically impressive and a "fevered, crusty masterpiece." SOVHorror stated that is "original, inventive, funny horror flick that wears its punk DIY aesthetic proudly."

The Wikipedia article for Twisted Issues was attempted to be deleted due to it "failing the Google test". But then other users found that it had been mentioned on IMDB and in books, resulting in the article staying up. This was later used by Jimmy Wales as an example on how Wikipedia's Articles for deletion works, in his 2005 TedTalk.
