= American Mummy =

2014 horror film

- Theatrical release poster
- Directed by: Charles Pinion
- Written by: Greg Salman
- Starring: Suziey Block
- Distributed by: Inferential Pictures
- Release date: 2014
- Running time: 82 minutes

American Mummy is a 2014 American horror film. It was directed by Charles Pinion, who is known for making Twisted Issues (1988). The screenplay was co-written with producer Greg Salman known for making Aztec Blood.

== Synopsis ==
American Mummy takes place at an archaeological excavation in the New Mexico desert, a group of students find a mummy wearing a mask made out of a human skull.

== Cast and characters ==
American Mummy stars Suziey Block from Dude Bro Party Massacre III; Exquisite Corpse; Entrance), Aidan Bristow, Aaron Burt, Esther Canata, Erin Condry, Rudy Marquez and Peter Marr.

- Suziey Block as Professor Jensen
- Aiden Bristow as Max
- Aaron Burt as Derek
- Esther Canata as Carmen
- Erin Condry as Connie
- Jack Grimmett as Phillip
- Rudy Marquez as Jose
- Peter Marr as Albert
- Rigo Obezo as Aztec Priest
- Jennifer June Ross as Becca
- Greg Salman as Dr. Lobachevsky.

== Production and release ==
American Mummy was directed by Charles Pinion, best known for making Twisted Issues (1988). And the screenplay was co-written with producer Greg Salman known for making Aztec Blood. Charles Pinion said that "The location was in a remote area of the desert, which felt magical to me." American Mummy had difficulties due to shooting in 3D. American Mummy was released on 3D Blu-ray and DVD with help from Wild Eye Releasing on May 9, 2017.

== Reception ==
American Mummy was reviewed poorly, with film critics criticizing the acting, and score. Critics praised the special effects makeup. In a positive review, PopHorror called American Mummy "oddly charming". HorrorSociety described it as "a b-movie, but it’s a good b-movie." HorrorNews praised the cinematography adding that Director Charles Pinion "shot the film as if he knew what it was like to be out there in the desert and sort of stuck."
