= Minoru Uchida =

Japanese actor and voice actor (1927–2018)

- Born: 18 March 1927; Okayama Prefecture, Japan
- Died: 2 April 2018 (aged 91)
- Occupations: Actor, Voice actor
- Years active: 1957–2018

Minoru Uchida (内田 稔, Uchida Minoru) (March 18, 1927 – April 2, 2018) was a Japanese actor and voice actor from Okayama Prefecture. He was affiliated with Gekidan Subaru. He was married to fellow voice actress Reiko Niimura.

== Live-action roles ==
=== Film ===
- Submersion of Japan (1973) (Research member)
- Panic High School (1978) (Kobayashi)
- The Fall of Ako Castle (1978) (Gengobee Toda)
- Onimasa (1982) (Kankichi Umeda)

=== Television drama ===
- Ōoku (1968) (Manabe Akifusa)
- Oretachi wa Tenshi da! (1979) episode #9
- Haru no Sakamichi (1971) (Naoe Kanetsugu)
- Ōgon no Hibi (1978) (Ishida Masazumi)
- Ōoku (episode #13, 1983) (Michizō Enjuin)
- Sanga Moyu (1984) (Saburō Kurusu)

Unknown date

- Key Hunter (episode #163) (Trade Director Kida)
- Mito Kōmon (Strange person (season 20, episode 33), Tsushimaya (season 21, episode 14), Tomezō (season 25, episode 6))
- Sanbiki ga Kiru! (first series, episode 6) (Touan Yamazaki)
- Sanbiki ga Kiru! (fourth series, episode 8) (Kenmotsu Shimojima)
- The Unfettered Shogun (Series VI Special)

== Voice roles ==
=== Theatrical animation ===
- Royal Space Force: The Wings of Honnêamise (1987) (General Khaidenn)

=== OVA ===
- Rurouni Kenshin: Trust & Betrayal (1999) (Tatsumi)

=== Video games ===
- Kingdom Hearts II (2005) (Merlin)

=== Dubbing ===
==== Live-action ====
- Henry Fonda
  - 12 Angry Men (1974 NTV edition) (Juror #8)
  - The Longest Day (1978 NTV edition) (Brig. Gen. Theodore Roosevelt Jr.)
  - Madigan (1978 TV Asahi edition) (Commissioner Anthony X. Russell)
  - Midway (1981 NTV edition) (Admiral Chester W. Nimitz)
  - Rollercoaster (1981 NTV edition) (Simon Davenport)
- Michael Gough
  - Batman (1995 TV Asashi edition) (Alfred Pennyworth)
  - Batman Returns (1994 TV Asashi edition) (Alfred Pennyworth)
  - Batman Forever (1998 TV Asashi edition) (Alfred Pennyworth)
  - Batman & Robin (2000 TV Asashi edition) (Alfred Pennyworth)
- Richard Crenna
  - First Blood (1985 NTV and 1995 TV Asahi editions) (Col. Sam Trautman)
  - Rambo: First Blood Part II (1995 TV Asahi edition) (Col. Sam Trautman)
  - Rambo III (1994 TV Asahi edition) (Col. Sam Trautman)
- Airport '77 (1981 NTV edition) (Philip Stevens (James Stewart))
- Babe (Arthur Hoggett (James Cromwell))
- Babe: Pig in the City (Arthur Hoggett (James Cromwell))
- Beethoven (Dr. Herman Varnick (Dean Jones))
- Born on the Fourth of July (VHS edition) (Eli Kovic (Raymond J. Barry))
- Braveheart (King Edward "Longshanks" (Patrick McGoohan))
- Cape Fear (1991) (Lee Heller (Gregory Peck))
- Cleopatra (1975 NTV edition) (Julius Caesar (Rex Harrison))
- Crazy like a Fox (Harrison "Harry" Fox, Senior (Jack Warden))
- Ed Wood (Bela Lugosi (Martin Landau))
- The Empire Strikes Back (1992 TV Asahi edition) (Yoda)
- ER (Doctor Gabriel Lawrence (Alan Alda))
- Finding Forrester (William Forrester (Sean Connery))
- Geronimo: An American Legend (Al Sieber (Robert Duvall))
- The Godfather Part II (1980 NTV edition) (Senator Pat Geary (G. D. Spradlin))
- Indiana Jones and the Last Crusade (1994 NTV edition) (Dr. Marcus Brody (Denholm Elliott))
- Lawrence of Arabia (1978 NTV edition) (Prince Faisal (Alec Guinness))
- The Pelican Brief (The President (Robert Culp))
- Shenandoah (1972 TBS edition) (Charlie Anderson (James Stewart))
- Superman (1983 TV Asahi edition) (Jonathan Kent (Glenn Ford))
- Tucker: The Man and His Dream (Homer Ferguson (Lloyd Bridges))
- Blindspot (Robert Borden (Ukweli Roach))

==== Animation ====
- An American Tail: Fievel Goes West (Wylie Burp)
- Disney productions (Pony Canyon and Bandai editions) (Pete)
- Disney Sing-Along Songs (Professor Owl)
- Dumbo (The Ringmaster)
- Hercules (Amphitryon)
- The Land Before Time (Littlefoot's grandfather)
- Mickey's Magical World (Jiminy Cricket)
- Mickey's Christmas Carol (Ghost of Christmas Present)
- Peter Pan (Pony Canyon edition) (George Darling)
- Pinocchio (Pony Canyon edition) (Geppetto)
- Robin Hood (Bandai edition) (Prince John)
- Sinbad: Legend of the Seven Seas (King Dymas)
- The Sword in the Stone (Merlin)
- Toot, Whistle, Plunk and Boom (Professor Owl)
- We're Back! A Dinosaur's Story (Captain Neweyes)
- Winnie-the-Pooh (Pony Canyon edition) (Tigger)
