= Merlin (Disney) =

Character from the 1963 animated film The Sword in the Stone

- The Sword in the Stone character
- Merlin, as he appears in the 1963 animated film The Sword in the Stone.
- First appearance: The Sword in the Stone (1963)
- Based on: Merlin, mythical figure from Arthurian legends
- Voiced by: Karl Swenson (The Sword in the Stone); Alan Young (An Adaptation of Dickens' Christmas Carol); Hamilton Camp (House of Mouse); Jeff Bennett (2005–present); Jim Meskimen (Once Upon a Studio)
- Portrayed by: Hamilton Camp (Disney Sing-Along Songs: Happy Haunting); Jeremy Swift (Descendants: The Rise of Red)

In-universe information
- Full name: Merlin the Magician
- Nickname: Marvin (by Sir Ector)
- Title: The World's Most Powerful Wizard
- Occupation: Wizard
- Weapon: Staff
- Origin: England
- Nationality: English
- Abilities: Magic and enchantments; Precognition; Shapeshifting
- Pets: Archimedes (owl)

Merlin is one of the main characters in Walt Disney Animation Studios' animated film The Sword in the Stone (1963). After that, also appearing in several Disney media, such as TV shows and – to a greater extent – video games. He is a powerful wizard, based on the mythical figure of the same name from the Arthurian legends. He was originally voiced by Karl Swenson in The Sword in the Stone, with Jeff Bennett being his main voice actor for his different media appearances since 2005.

== Background ==
=== Appearance ===
Merlin is an old man with a long white beard and glasses. He wears a blue tunic, and a pointed hat of the same color. He also wears long blue shoes. He usually carries a staff with him, which he also uses to perform his spells.

Whenever he transforms into an animal, he always retains the color blue on his body, with his glasses also retained. Some of these animal forms also retain his facial hair in various ways.

When he returns from his vacation in Bermuda in the 20th century, he wears modern clothing such as Bermuda shorts, a short-sleeved shirt, sneakers, a baseball cap, and sunglasses.

=== Personality ===
Merlin is a man of great wisdom, and also usually comes across as kind and with the attitude of a gentleman. Although he is also shown to have a short temper, as shown when Archimedes argues with him about raising Wart, or when Wart announces his choice as squire. Despite his wise attitude, he can also be clueless with some things, as he shows by taking the wrong path to Sir Ector's castle.

According to Wolfgang Reitherman, director of The Sword in the Stone, they wanted Merlin to be eccentric, but not hokey.

=== Powers and abilities ===
As a wizard, Merlin shows a wide variety of powers and is hailed as the most powerful wizard in the world. His magical abilities include being able to visualize the future (if not everything in it), disappear, shapeshifting (throughout The Sword in the Stone he transforms into different animals), or give inanimate objects the ability to move.

Merlin also apparently has laboratory equipment, indicating he is knowledgeable in alchemy for making potions. He also owns models of future vehicles built by himself.

== Appearances ==
=== The Sword in the Stone (1963) ===
Set in the medieval period, Merlin is an old wizard who lives in a house in the woods with his owl, Archimedes. Using his powers of prediction, Merlin foresees a visit from someone special. That person turns out to be a boy named Arthur, nicknamed Wart by others. Merlin decides to offer his services as the boy's tutor.

After convincing Sir Ector, Wart's adoptive father, to let him stay at the castle and care for Wart, Merlin uses his magical powers to transform both himself and Wart into various animals, such as fish and squirrels, to teach the boy important life lessons. When Merlin transforms Wart into a sparrow so he can experience flight, the boy inadvertently ends up at the house of Madam Mim, a witch and Merlin’s old rival. Merlin rescues Wart and challenges Madam Mim to a magical duel, where the two transform into different animals. Merlin ultimately emerges victorious.

Some time later, Wart proudly announces to Merlin that he has been chosen to be a squire. The news disappoints Merlin, who hopes for a brighter future for the boy. After a heated argument, Merlin, in a fit of frustration, decides to leave and abandon his role as Wart's tutor, and time travels to the 20th century of Bermuda.

Time passes, and Wart eventually becomes King Arthur after pulling the sword from the stone. Overwhelmed by the pressures of kingship, Arthur desperately calls out to Merlin, who returns after taking a vacation to the 20th century. When Arthur and Archimedes explain the situation, Merlin realizes that Arthur is destined to become a legendary figure. Renewing his role as advisor, Merlin once again stands by Arthur’s side to guide him on his path.

=== Television ===
Like other Disney animated characters, Merlin (voiced by Hamilton Camp) made recurring cameo appearances in the television series House of Mouse (2001–2003) as a guest in the titular club. His only speaking appearances are in the episodes "Rent Day", where he promises to give Mickey the 50 dollars he needs to pay the rent of the club if he can find a sword for Arthur, and "House of Magic", where he asks the Magic Mirror if Arthur will be a good king.

Merlin (voiced by Jeff Bennett) makes guest appearances in some episodes of Sofia the First (2016–2017). He first appears in a major role in "Gone with the Wand", where Sofia, Cedric and Calista visits him in the tower where he lives, but during the visit, Calista takes Merlin's dragon claw wand out of the tower, allowing Merlin's enemy Morgana to take it, but she ends up being defeated by Merlin, with the help of Cedric and Calista. Merlin then makes minor appearances in "Day of the Sorcerers", "Too Cute to Spook", and "The Great Pretender".

In The Wonderful World of Mickey Mouse (2020–2021), Merlin appears in his fish form in the episode "School of Fish" as a teacher in the school for fish. He later makes an appearance in the episode "Disappearing Act" (voiced again by Bennett), where he appears to advise Mickey along with other magical characters.

=== Video games ===
Merlin has common appearances as a guide for the players in Disney games in which he appears typically along with characters from other Disney productions. He is voiced by Jeff Bennett in all of his video game appearances.

==== Kingdom Hearts series ====
Merlin appears as a recurring character in the Kingdom Hearts series as an ally of the protagonists. He is typically present in the hub world of the games in which he appears.

He first appears in Kingdom Hearts (2002) residing in a hidden underground house in Traverse Town, where he helps Sora train in his magical abilities. Merlin also possesses the Hundred Acre Wood book, which Sora uses to transport himself to that world.

In Kingdom Hearts II (2005), Merlin moved to Hollow Bastion and lived in the headquarters of the Hollow Bastion Restoration Committee, being a member of the group restoring the world. He still has the Hundred Acre Wood book with him, and also gave Sora the Baseball Charm to summon Chicken Little. He is also called to the Disney Castle to help stop Maleficent's spell on the world, so Merlin offers a door with which Sora, Donald and Goofy can transport themselves to the past to discover the origin of this danger and try to stop her. Later, like the other characters present in Hollow Bastion, Merlin remembers that Hollow Bastion was once known as Radiant Garden.

In the prequel Kingdom Hearts Birth by Sleep (2010), a decade before the events of the first Kingdom Hearts, he resides in Radiant Garden, where he gives Terra, Ventus, and Aqua permission to view the Hundred Acre Wood book, granting them access to the Hundred Acre Wood Command Board.

In Kingdom Hearts III (2019), Merlin sends Kairi and Lea to a realm where time is stilled, allowing them to train at their own pace. Sora, Donald, and Goofy meet Merlin in Twilight Town, where the wizard reveals to have the Hundred Acre Wood storybook with him.

In the original Japanese version of the games, Merlin is voiced by Minoru Uchida in Kingdom Hearts II, Hiroshi Arikawa in Birth by Sleep, and Atsushi Goto in Kingdom Hearts III. (Note: Merlin is unvoiced in the first Kingdom Hearts, with his dialogues appearing in speech balloons.)

==== Other video games ====
Merlin was the host of the interactive game Sorcerers of the Magic Kingdom (2012) present at Magic Kingdom, until it was shut down in 2021.

In Disney Infinity 3.0 (2015), Merlin appears in the Toy Box Takeover expansion game, where when Syndrome gets hold of Merlin's magic wand, the player has to stop him. Merlin appears as a guide for the player explaining the missions.

Merlin appears in Disney Magic Kingdoms (2016), being the guide for the player in the game's storyline. He is also the owner of Merlin's Shop, where he sell items or cast help spells in his cauldron. Originally a non-playable character, Merlin become a playable character after a game update.

Merlin appears as a playable character in Disney Heroes: Battle Mode (2019).

Merlin was a playable character in Disney Sorcerer's Arena (2020–2024), where he was available in his normal outfit and could be changed into his Bermuda outfit.

Merlin is one of the villagers that appear in Disney Dreamlight Valley (2023), where he guides the player since the beginning of the game, and has a recurring role in quests in which he is involved for the progress of the story.

=== Descendants franchise ===
Merlin has recurring appearances in the media of the Descendants franchise.

He appears in a supporting role in the second book of The Isle of the Lost series, Return to the Isle of the Lost (2016), where he and Artie, the son of Arthur, visit King Ben to warn him about a monster attacking Camelot. After investigating, they discover that the culprit behind these attacks was Merlin's former adversary, Madam Mim, transformed into a dragon. Merlin later appears in a minor role in the fourth book of the series, Escape from the Isle of the Lost (2019), as the representative of Camelot in a council known as National Association of Far Far Away.

A younger Merlin (portrayed by Jeremy Swift) appears in the live-action film Descendants: The Rise of Red (2024), the fourth installment of the Descendants film series, where he appears in the time in which he was the principal and founder of Merlin Academy. After the film's protagonists Red and Chloe travel back in time and meet him, they pretend to be exchange students at his academy, so Merlin accepts them into the school and takes them to the alchemy class where he teaches. The next night, after being warned by Archimedes that there are intruders in his office, he finds the group of young villains led by Uliana petrified by one of his security enchantments, so he tells them that as punishment they will remain that way for a long time.

Merlin is a supporting character in the novel Welcome to Merlin Academy: A Descendants Mystery (2026), taking place before the events seen in Descendants: The Rise of Red.

=== Other appearances ===
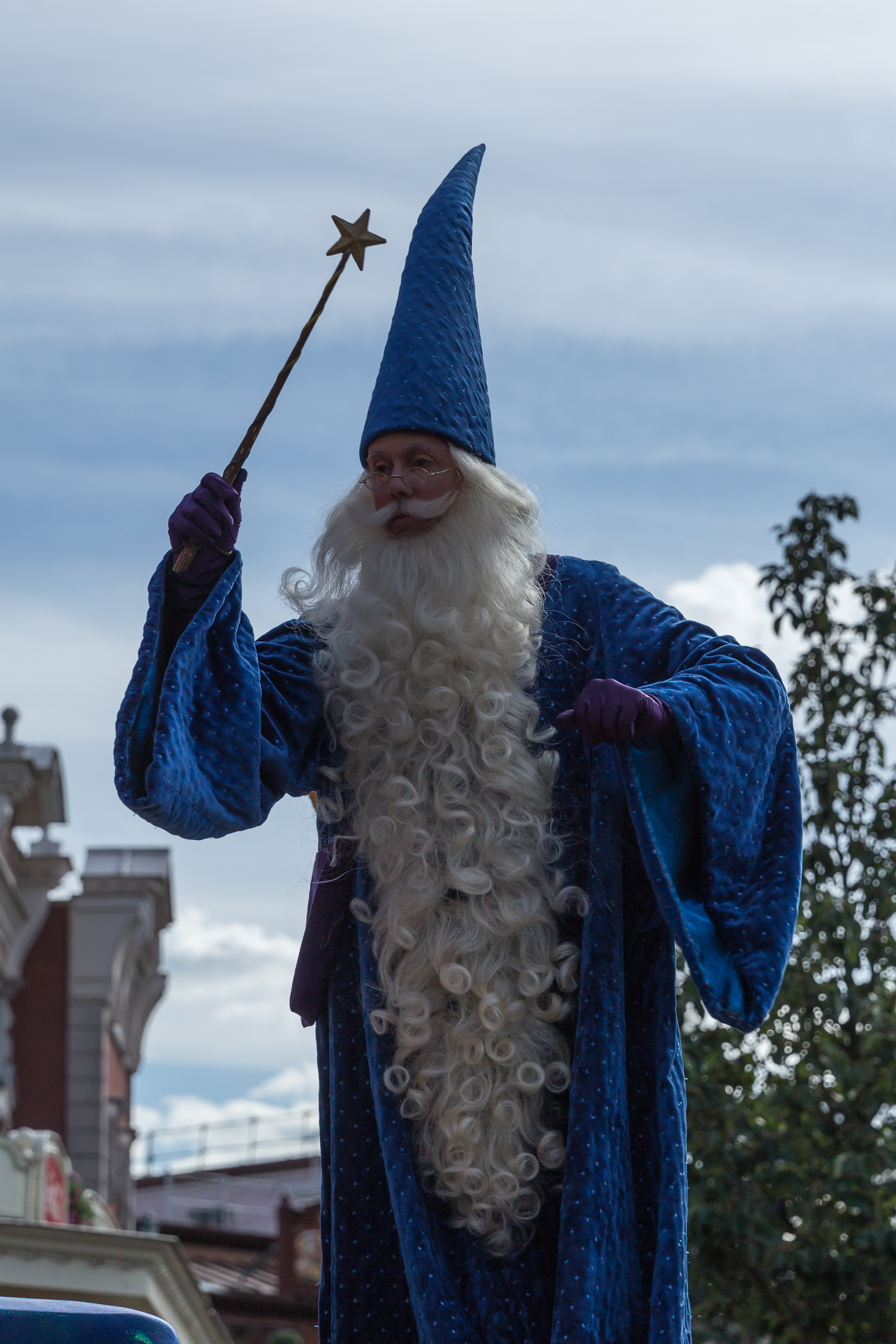
Merlin in Disney Magic on Parade at Disneyland Paris.

In addition to comic book adaptations of The Sword in the Stone, Merlin has had appearances in some Disney comics set in a shared universe with other Disney animated characters.

Merlin appears as a meet-and-greet character at Disney Parks, although his appearances are very rarely, and is present in some live shows and parades.

Merlin (voiced by Alan Young) plays the Ghost of Christmas Past in the Disneyland Records album An Adaptation of Dickens' Christmas Carol (1974), which was issued with a supplementary illustrated storybook.

A live-action appearance of Merlin (portrayed by Hamilton Camp) is present in the Disney Sing-Along Songs installment Happy Haunting – Party at Disneyland! (1998).

Marlin has a cameo appearance among the audience in the House of Mouse direct-to-video film Mickey's Magical Christmas: Snowed in at the House of Mouse (2001).

At the beginning of the episode "The Dark Swan" (2015) from the television series Once Upon a Time, Merlin can be seen on the cinema screen where The Sword in the Stone is being shown.

Merlin (voiced by Jim Meskimen) has a cameo appearance in the short film Once Upon a Studio (2023), where Moana asks him to help Flounder needing water for the fish, so Merlin conjures water inside the Mad Hatter's hat to save him. Later, Merlin appears as part of the group photo along with the rest of characters from Walt Disney Animation Studios.

=== Parodies ===
Merlin (voiced by Dan Fogler) has an appearance in the Robot Chicken episode "Ext. Forest – Day" (2018), where Arthur proposes to him to transform the squirrel girl into a human to have a relationship with her.
