= Alberto Gieco =

Argentine movie maker and educator

Alberto Gieco is an Argentine movie maker and educator born in Santa Clara De Buena Vista, Santa Fe, Argentina in 1952. He is mainly active in Brazil and North America. He is a retired professor who taught at Occidental College in Los Angeles and several other schools in Southern California. He is also cousins and friends with Argentinian folk legend Leon Gieco known as the "Argentine Bob Dylan".

He has been the director and first assistant director for numerous films. He also produced and directed the documentary film Punks, one of, if not the first documentary covering the emergent Punk scene in São Paulo, in the late 1970s and early 1980s. A list of his better known works includes:

- Chuck and Buck (2000) - Production Supervisor
- Adios East Los (1999) - Assistant Director
- Liar's Poker (1999) - Assistant Director
- First Love, Last Rites (1998) - Assistant Director
- They Come at Night (1998) - Assistant Director
- How to Make the Cruelest Month (1997) - Associate Producer
- At Play in the Fields of the Lord (1991) - First Assistant Director
