= Punk the Capital =

DC Punk documentary

- Directed by: James June Schneider; Paul Bishow
- Produced by: Paul Bishow; Sam Lavine
- Production companies: PTC International; Sphairos Productions
- Release date: June 2019
- Running time: 90 minutes
- Language: English

Punk the Capital; Building a Sound Movement is a documentary film released in June 2019, focusing on the historical roots of the Washington, D.C. punk community. It was produced and directed by filmmaker James June Schneider and co-created with filmmaker Paul Bishow. Sam Lavine was also a producer of the film.

== Plot ==
The documentary's main focus is the origin stories of three bands: Bad Brains, Minor Threat and The Slickee Boys. The filmmakers used vast archives from private and public collections dating back into the mid-1970's, from a children's television show featuring Kim Kane of The Slickee Boys to footage of Bad Brains' early shows. A significant chunk of the footage used in the film was taken in 1979 and 1980 by filmmaker Paul Bishow of punk and hardcore shows at DC's original Madam's Organ Art Cooperative. Other bands included in the documentary are Untouchables, Half Japanese, Government Issue, Faith, SOA, Scream, Void, Black Market Baby, Tru Fax and the Insaniacs, DOA, Youth Brigade, and Rites of Spring, in addition to interviews with Ian MacKaye, Henry Rollins and Jello Biafra.

== Reviews ==
Uncut rated the film four out of five stars, stating, "The wealth of great video footage in Punk The Capital underlines what made DC hardcore unique; the main protagonists were not marginal dropouts, as they were in New York and California, but the well-heeled, eloquent children of admirals, diplomats and journalists, with the will and means to succeed without outside support." The Washington Post described the film's coverage of Bad Brians as a "compelling narrative" and that the "archival footage of this quartet of black musicians in a predominantly white community gives a sense of just what a jolt to the system they were."

== Showings ==
Since its release, the documentary has been shown at film festivals and AFI Silver's "More Than a Witness: Positive Force DC and Revolution Summer at 40" in 2025 and cited in publications about punk music's history. The materials discovered while making the documentary helped spur the creation of the DC Punk Archives, held by the Washington, D.C. Public Library. The archives launched in 2014, five years ahead the film's release.
