= Punkcast =

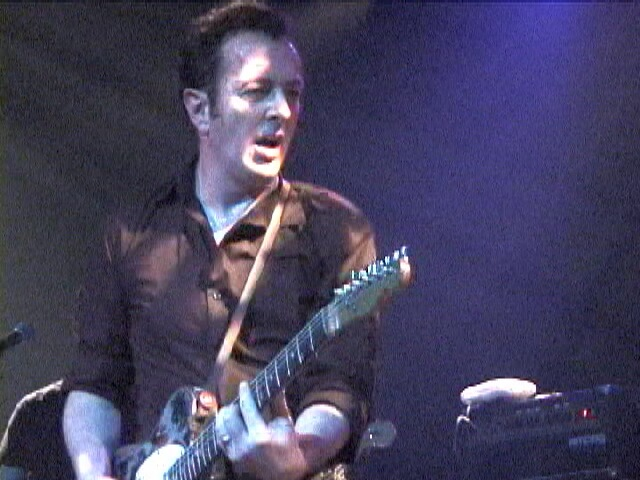
Joe Strummer on Punkcast

Punkcast.com was an online video site that covered the NYC underground music scene. The site, though not active, remains with an archive of videos from 1997 to 2011. Newer videos are now on the Punkcast YouTube channel.

== History ==
=== Background ===
Punkcast's founder Joly MacFie was born in England and during the punk scene in the late 70s and early 80s sold badges and pins through his company Better Badges, before in 1983 selling the business to his staff and moving to New York.

=== Early years ===
Punkcast was started in September 1997 to cover the visit to NYC of punk band One Way System, in order to demonstrate the internet's broadcast potential to the band's manager John Bentham who had run Jettisoundz, a major creator/distributor of punk video in the UK. In the early days the site covered old-school punk via several cameramen, but in 2001 MacFie started himself shooting the local indie scene. In September 2005 Punkcast launched a video podcast and later a YouTube channel.

=== Later years ===
The content is mainly complete songs from live performances in the city's clubs and other locations. but the site occasionally covers other local community events. In 2003, Punkcast also made available some DVDs via their website and accepted donations. Punkcast often follows a DIY policy of filming the footage unasked, but usually with permission, and then posting single tunes. Founder Joly MacFie argues that this serves an important archival purpose.

== YouTube account suspension ==
In July 2009 the Punkcast YouTube channel was briefly suspended after a DMCA claim by Richard Hell over a segment of him talking about a new record. Hell recanted when he was made aware of the ramifications of his actions, and withdrew the claim, and the segment was deleted. MacFie said "I appreciate the irony of the DIY site punkcast being taken down by arguably the originator of punk style using entirely establishment means." Hell explained to MacFie, "I just wish you would ask me before you post clips of me... if there's anything I can do to support your reinstatement at YouTube, I'd be happy to do it".

== Bands filmed ==
In 2001 Punkcast published live videos of both the Moldy Peaches and Yeah Yeah Yeahs.

In 2002 Punkcast published 4 songs from Joe Strummer's final USA shows in Brooklyn, months before his death, .

== Screenings ==
In 2003 Punkcast supplied some of the live programming for the first year of New York Noise - a local music show on the nascent municipal TV station NYC Media.

In June 2007 an installation of Punkcast videos was part of the first FILMER LA MUSIQUE exhibit at Point Éphémère in Paris.

Punkcast clips of several bands, including Yeah Yeah Yeahs, TV on the Radio, Kimya Dawson, and Moldy Peaches were used in the 2022 documentary Meet Me in the Bathroom.

== Awards ==
In May 2006: Wired Magazine described punkcast.com in its "Watch This Way" list as "visceral scenes of pop art in the making".

In October 2007: Village Voice awarded MacFie 'Best documentarian of New York's indie-rock scene' in their Best of NYC 2007 issue.

In October 2010: Village Voice awarded MacFie 'Best Uploader of Geek Culture and Music', one of many specialized awards in their Best of NYC 2010 issue.
