= Skinhead Attitude =

2003 documentary film by Daniel Schweizer

Skinhead Attitude is a 2003 documentary about the skinhead subculture, made by Daniel Schweizer (who also directed the films White Terror and Skin or Die).

It outlined the history of 40 years of the skinhead subculture, beginning with the most recent versions of the culture. One of the topics it explored is the political component, which ranged from far left to far right. The film described the transformation and radicalisation of this youth subculture.
