= Panic High School =

- Cover of DVD edition together with Isolation of 1/880000
- 高校大パニック
- Directed by: Gakuryū Ishii; Yukihiro Sawada
- Production company: Nikkatsu
- Release date: August 19, 1978 (Japan)
- Running time: 94 minutes
- Country: Japan
- Language: Japanese

Panic High School (Japanese: 高校大パニック, Hepburn: Koko Dai Panikku), also known as High School Big Panic and Panic in High School, is a Japanese youth suspense action film directed by Gakuryū Ishii and Yukihiro Sawada. The film is a remake of a film of the same name released the year before and also directed by Ishii. The plot follows Jono, a high school student who steals a rifle and shoots at his school staff before holding multiple students hostage as revenge for the school's oppressive academic system. It was released in Japan on August 19, 1978.

== Plot ==
Student Tanaka Shouji commits suicide, heavily impacting the school's morale. Overworked student Yasuhiro Jono (Shigeru Yamamoto) walks into a gun shop and sees a rifle, which he swiftly steals along with several boxes of ammo. He then runs back to his school and shoots his math teacher (Koreharu Hisatomi) dead as revenge for having previously berated him and other students, along with accidentally injuring a student. As the police arrive, the principal announces there is a student with a gun running free in the school. The police spot him, at which point he takes a student hostage as he runs into a bathroom. When the police burst into the room, he shoots and injures them. During the ensuing panic, he continues to exchange gunfire with the officers and is injured in the leg.

After the principal and police officers argue about whether they should try to kill the armed student, the local detectives call in for special armed forces as the school is evacuated. Jono then takes a classroom full of students and locks all the doors, essentially keeping them all hostages. As the students discuss outside, some of them condemn Jono's actions, while one of them praises him and admits he would've done the same if he had the opportunity. The student counselor, Yoneshige (Hideaki Esumi), attempts to reason with Jono, to no avail. As police helicopters arrive, a female student starts screaming at one of them to save her. As Jono and the student struggle, she accidentally falls out the window onto the emergency stairs and falls unconscious.

Jono's parents arrive at the school to aid the counselor with the negotiations. While his mother attempts to convince him that she will forgive him and try to help him with rebuilding his future, his father yells at him, telling him to give himself up and accept his incoming penalty. Jono snaps and shoots at his parents, injuring no one. After one of his hostages eventually try and ask him to let them go, Jono wrestles with him, pinning him to a desk and threatening to shoot him. Taking advantage of the distraction, the other hostages unlock the back door and escape. Two female students, Murakami Miyoko and Takuda Naomi remain inside.

As a crowd has witnessing the events forms outside, Japanese nationalists arrive outside, calling the event "disgraceful" and blaming it on the spread of communist and democratic values. A bystander asks them to quiet down, breaking out a fight. A passing jogger blames it on the current generation's lack of exercise, at which point he gets into an argument which also escalates into a fight. The two remaining hostages' parents arrive and hysterically beg for Jono's parents to convince him to give himself up. Jono loudly plays a vinyl record to cover up the sounds of him breaking down the exit door, where he forces his two hostages left out of the building; Only Murakami follows him. The police spot him as he runs down an alleyway, after which he forces his sole hostage to walk up the stairs to the science lab, where they engage in small talk. After she offers him a cigarette, he opens up to her about his intention of committing suicide. After knocking down multiple chemical vases while moving desks around for better outside visibility, Jono accidentally starts a fire. The police higher-up gives the snipers permission to kill the suspect, but they accidentally shoot his last hostage. Realizing he has nothing left to lose as his sole sympathizer is now dead, Jono starts shooting at the police, at which point they break into the classroom and successfully disarm and arrest him.

In the aftermath of the shooting, the school staff discuss about restarting classes tomorrow, while his parents sorrow about how everything they've worked for their son's academic future has been destroyed.

== Cast ==
- Shigeru Yamamoto as Yasuhiro Jono
- Koreharu Hisatomi as Osamu Ihara
- Atsuko Asano as Miyoko Murakami
- Hideaki Esumi as Yoneshige
- Minoru Uchida as Kobayashi Katsuichi

== Reception ==
On Midnight Eye, Nicholas Rucka calls it "a funky late 70s film with a knock-out soundtrack, AWOL snap zooms, and more shrieks than should rightly be in anything but a horror movie."

In a 2018 interview with Time Out, Ishii admits that he did not think Panic High School was very good, but also commented that creating the film enabled him to achieve what he really wanted to do in cinema.
